= Haavisto =

Haavisto is a Finnish surname, most prevalent in Satakunta. Notable people with the surname include:

- Arvo Haavisto (1900–1977), Finnish wrestler
- Jukka Haavisto (1930–2023), Finnish songwriter and entrepreneur
- Heikki Haavisto (1935–2022), Finnish politician
- Kari Haavisto (born 1941), Finnish Olympic swimmer
- Olli Haavisto (born 1954), Finnish guitarist
- Susanna Haavisto (born 1957), Finnish actress and singer
- Pekka Haavisto (born 1958), Finnish politician
- Janne Haavisto (born 1964), Finnish drummer
- Jani Haavisto (born 1987), Finnish darts player
