= Jukka Haavisto =

Finnish musician (1930–2023)

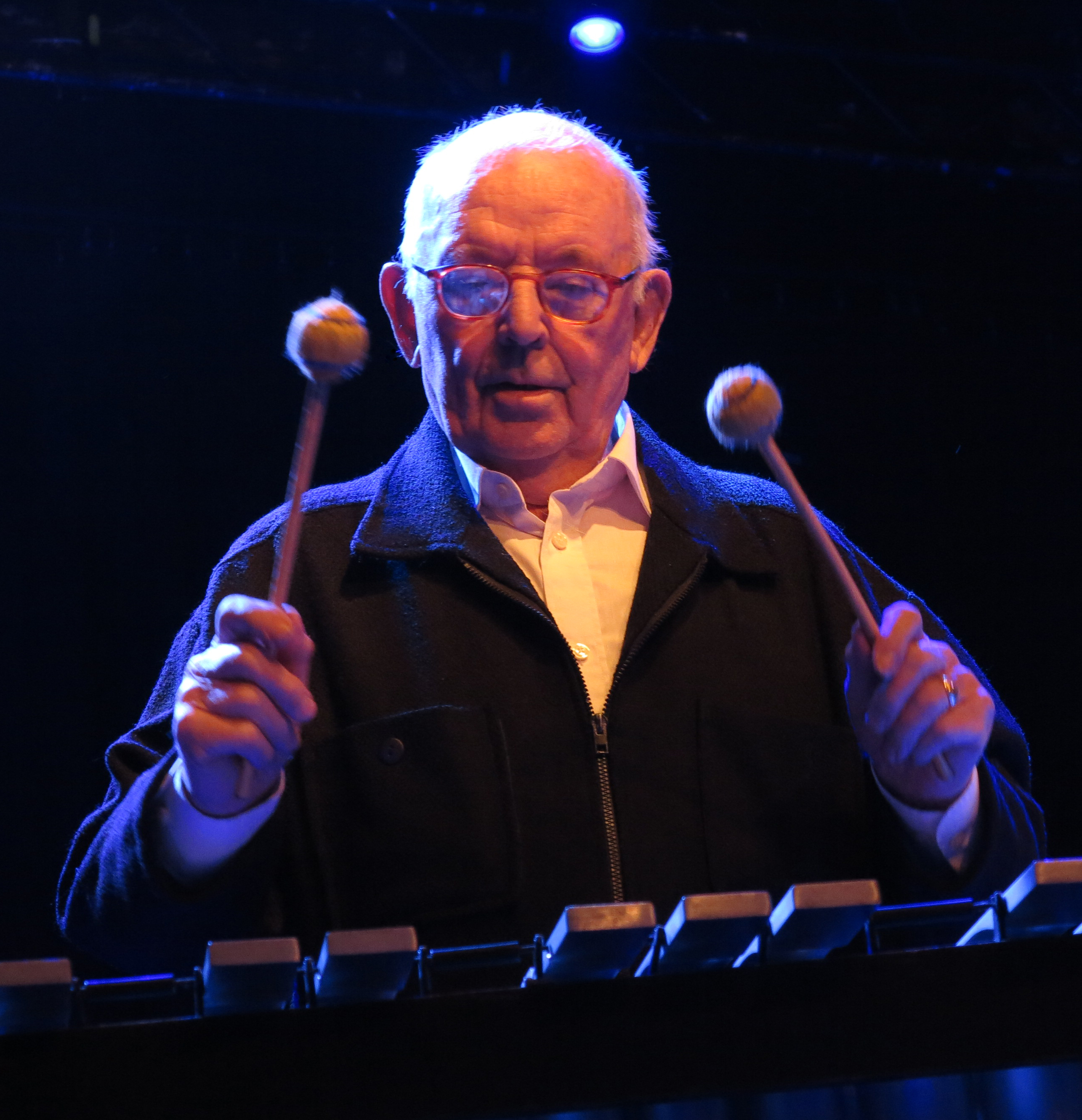
- Haavisto performing in 2014

Background information
- Born: Juhani Haavisto; 5 June 1930; Alajärvi, Finland
- Origin: Southern Ostrobothnia, Finland
- Died: 24 November 2023 (aged 93)
- Genres: Swing
- Occupations: Musician, advertisement entrepreneur
- Instruments: Accordion, vibraphone
- Years active: 1959–2020

Juhani "Jukka" Haavisto (5 June 1930 – 24 November 2023) was a Finnish musician with the honorary title of music councilor. He also worked as a businessman in advertising business from 1959 to the 1990s, when he retired. However, he is perhaps best known for his work as a songwriter and for having played the vibraphone and the accordion in numerous bands.

== Biographical details ==
Jukka Haavisto passed the matriculation exams in Kauhava in 1948 and studied to become a teacher, graduating from the Jyväskylä Pedagogical Institute in 1956. He worked in the advertising agency SEK from 1959 to 1968, in the end as the person in charge of liaisons. After that he worked in the advertising agency Artifex as the vice-CEO until 1978. He founded his own advertising agency PRAX in 1975, and worked there in the capacity of CEO and chairman.

== Career as a musician ==
Haavisto performed publicly for the first time at the age of 10, when he played a harmonica together with a friend in a broadcast by Yle. He had received the harmonica as a Christmas present from his mother the previous Christmas, on the very same day when his father was killed in the Winter War at Taipaleenjoki. Haavisto’s dearest genre in music became swing, which he played with the accordion and the vibraphone.

When I first heard it, the rhythm of the swing felt my own, and it kindled an interest which has never faded. […] In my heart I’m a musician that loves jazz.

Haavisto’s most important bands were the Happy Swing Band, the Jukka Haavisto Band and the Haavisto Swingers.

Haavisto performed publicly for the last time on 27 February 2020. He had been suffering from borreliosis and his hands no longer executed the orders coming from the brain to perfection. He had already made the decision to retire as a musician, but when he was listening to the Happy Swing Band, he felt that he had to perform once more with his friends. He played a vibraphone solo, “which went relatively well, considering the circumstances. But a promise of playing relatively well is not enough for a new start. […] I decided that it is better to quit out of my own accord, not when I’m forced to, demanded by the public.”

Haavisto was pleased to see the talent of the new generations of jazz musicians in Finland. He said, “I’m exhilarated to see these new generations, which have raised the Finnish jazz to new national and international levels. Finnish jazz is no longer based on imitation, not even on copying from one’s idols.”

== Organizational activities ==
Haavisto acted as the head of the Finnish Jazz Archive, later the Finnish Jazz & Pop Archive (the current Musiikkiarkisto (‘Music Archive’)), during 1991–97. He said he was “easily provoked to reckless undertakings, it is easy to talk me into new things.”

Haavisto was one of the founders of the Association for the Promotion of Finnish Popular Music in 1994. He acted as its director until 2004. The association launched a virtual museum (www.pomus.net) in the internet in December of that year.

Haavisto was also a published author. His book Puuvillapelloilta kaskimaille (‘From the cotton fields to the land of slash-and-burn’) (1991), is still the most recent general treatise of jazz in Finland. He wondered why no one had written an up-to-date work more recently. His book has some 400 pages, and in it he writes about 1,500 Finnish jazz musicians.

== Awards ==
Haavisto received the following awards and prizes for his services to Finnish jazz and popular music:

- 1995 The Andania Prize of Jazz Finland
- 1995 The Louis Armstrong Award of Classic Jazz Association (Finland)
- 2000 Prix ELVIS of the Elvis Association (Finland)
- 2007 honorary title of music councilor
- 2010 Archive feat of the year for groundbreaking work for the national heritage in the fields of jazz and popular music

== Personal life and death ==
Haavisto's sons Janne and Olli are well-known musicians in Finland and even internationally. Janne has played in J. Karjalainen & Mustat Lasit, Laika & The Cosmonauts, and Olli has played in J. Karjalainen & Mustat Lasit, Freud Marx Engels & Jung and with Mikko Kuustonen and Tuomari Nurmio. His daughter Susanna Haavisto is a singer and an actress.

Jukka Haavisto died on 24 November 2023, at the age of 93.

== Bands ==
- Carmen (1945–1949)
- JH quintet (1950–1951)
- Martti Nummi sextet (1952)
- Pihlajamaan Pelimannit (1952–1953)
- LL quintet (1954–1955)
- Jorma Weneskoski orchestra (1956–1962)
- Happy Swing Band (1978–)
- Jukka Haavisto Band
- Haavisto Swingers (1990–)
- Western Swingers (1998–)

== Publications ==
- Haavisto, Jukka (1991). Puuvillapelloilta kaskimaille: Jatsin ja jazzin vaiheita Suomessa [‘From the cotton fields to the land of slash-and-burn. The history of jazz in Finland ’]. Helsinki: Otava. ISBN 951-1-11419-0.
