= Et ole yksin =

2013 studio album by J. Karjalainen

Studio album by J. Karjalainen
- Released: 15 March 2013
- Genre: Pop
- Length: 44:27
- Label: Warner Music Finland / Jukan Productions
- Producer: Janne Haavisto

Singles from Et ole yksin
- 1. "Mennyt mies" Released: 31 December 2012; 2. "Meripihkahuone" Released: 8 March 2013

Et ole yksin is a 2013 studio album by Finnish singer-songwriter J. Karjalainen. It was released on 15 March 2013. The other musicians working with Karjalainen on the album are Janne Haavisto, Mikko Lankinen, Pekka Gröhn and Tom Nyman.

== Commercial reception ==
Et ole yksin debuted at number one on the Official Finnish Album Chart.

== Critical reception ==
The album has received generally positive reviews. Ilkka Mattila of Helsingin Sanomat wrote that the best part of the album are the lyrics that are often layered with both social and personal undertones. Jose Riikonen of Rumba noted that while the album features several fine pop songs, they seem to lack a connection to each other.

== Singles ==
Two singles were released from the album. "Mennyt mies", released in December 2012, peaked at number one on the Official Finnish Download Chart and at number three on the Official Finnish Singles Chart. "Meripihkahuone" was released in March 2013 and peaked at number 14 on the Official Finnish Download Chart.

== Track listing ==
No.	Title	Length
1.	"Mennyt mies"	3:54
2.	"Riisinjyvä"	3:26
3.	"Kreosootti"	4:09
4.	"Yksi kerrallaan"	3:56
5.	"Meripihkahuone"	3:21
6.	"Et ole yksin"	3:41
7.	"Sydänlupaus"	3:32
8.	"Marquita"	3:17
9.	"Kurkien äänet"	3:15
10.	"Sinivalkoisia sirpaleita"	3:26
11.	"Ole nuori"	4:57
12.	"Sinisestä kankaasta"	3:09

== Charts and certifications ==
=== Charts ===
Chart (2013)	Peak position
Finnish Albums (Suomen virallinen lista)	1

=== Certifications ===
Region	Certification	Certified units/sales
Finland (Musiikkituottajat)	2× Platinum	44,584
