= Kuustonen =

Kuustonen is a Finnish surname. Notable people with the surname include:

- Iina Kuustonen (born 1984), Finnish actress
- Mikko Kuustonen (born 1960), Finnish singer-songwriter and television personality
