= Haavikko =

Haavikko is a Finnish-language surname meaning "aspen grove". Notable people with the name include:

- Hanna Haavikko (born 1975), Finnish middle distance runner
- Paavo Haavikko (1931–2008), Finnish poet, playwright, essayist and publisher
- Ritva Haavikko (born 1929), Finnish literary researcher and non-fiction author
- (Fictional) Haavikko family from the children's book series Haavikko Stables by Finnish author Merja Jalo

== See also ==
- Keykino, Leningrad Oblast, Russia had Finnish name Haavikko
- Haavisto
