= Mennyt mies =

Single by J. Karjalainen

from the album Et ole yksin
- Released: 31 December 2012
- Recorded: 2012
- Length: 4:15
- Label: Jukan Productions Oy / Warner Music Finland
- Songwriter: J. Karjalainen
- Producer: Janne Haavisto

J. Karjalainen singles chronology
"Mennyt mies" (2012)	"Meripihkahuone" (2013)

"Mennyt mies" is a song by a Finnish singer-songwriter J. Karjalainen. The song serves as the first single from his album Et ole yksin, released on 15 March 2013. The accompanying music video was uploaded to YouTube on 31 December 2012.

== Lyrics ==
J. Karjalainen is singing about pop culture archetypes, such as "a silvery disco man" and "a lizard man licking his tongue". He also mentions "a New England Leather Man", a vagabond who walked 10–12 miles a day through western Connecticut and eastern New York state in the late 19th century. He has explained that the character "Markku", which is told in the lyrics to be the main character's former name, is an homage to a medical doctor Reima Kampman. His studies of hypnosis and self-suggestion have helped J. Karjalainen in creating his music.

== Chart performance ==
"Mennyt mies" peaked at number one on the Official Finnish Download Chart on 10 January 2013. On the Official Finnish Singles Chart, the song peaked at number three on 1 February 2013.

== Charts ==
Chart (2013)	Peak position
Finland (Suomen virallinen lista)	3
