= Alivuokralainen =

Alivuokralainen (Finnish for "the sub-tenant") is a Finnish comedy play written by Timo Kahilainen and Heikki Vihinen and directed by Heikki Vihinen. The play stars Heikki Hela, Heikki Kinnunen, Kake Aunesneva, Jukka Leisti, Ritva Jalonen, Ilpo Hakala, Tuija Ernamo, Pete Keskinen and Mikko Rantaniva. It premiered in 2003 and is still showing in Tampere.

== Plot ==
Entomologist Pauli Bergström and kidney surgeon Lauri Mustonen share a 280 m^{2} rented apartment in the centre of Helsinki. Their peaceful, uneventful life is interrupted when their landlady, aging aristocrat Lydia Molotova, decides to give the apartment as a gift to her nephew, Sergeant John Molotov. Immediately, Sergeant Molotov raises the rent by a factor of more than ten, which is more than Bergström and Mustonen can pay. Not wanting to move elsewhere, they place an ad in the newspaper, looking for a sub-tenant to help them pay the rent. The sub-tenant is Carl Robert Palmberg, a Finland-Swedish interior decorator in his 30s, who is openly gay. Things get further complicated when Sergeant Molotov has to undergo surgery because of an infected kidney, and Mustonen decides to operate him privately.
