= Meripihkahuone =

Single by J. Karjalainen

from the album Et ole yksin
- Released: 8 March 2013
- Recorded: 2012
- Length: 3:23
- Label: Warner Music Finland / Jukan Productions
- Songwriter: J. Karjalainen
- Producer: Janne Haavisto

J. Karjalainen singles chronology
"Mennyt mies" (2012)	"Meripihkahuone" (2013)

"Meripihkahuone" is a song by a Finnish singer-songwriter J. Karjalainen. The song serves as the second single from his album Et ole yksin. Released on 8 March 2013, the song peaked at number 14 on the Official Finnish Download Chart.

== Charts ==
Chart (2013)	Peak position
Finland Download (Latauslista)	14
