= Ohranjyvä =

Restaurant in Tampere, Finland

Coordinates: 61°29′58.37″N 23°45′15.25″E

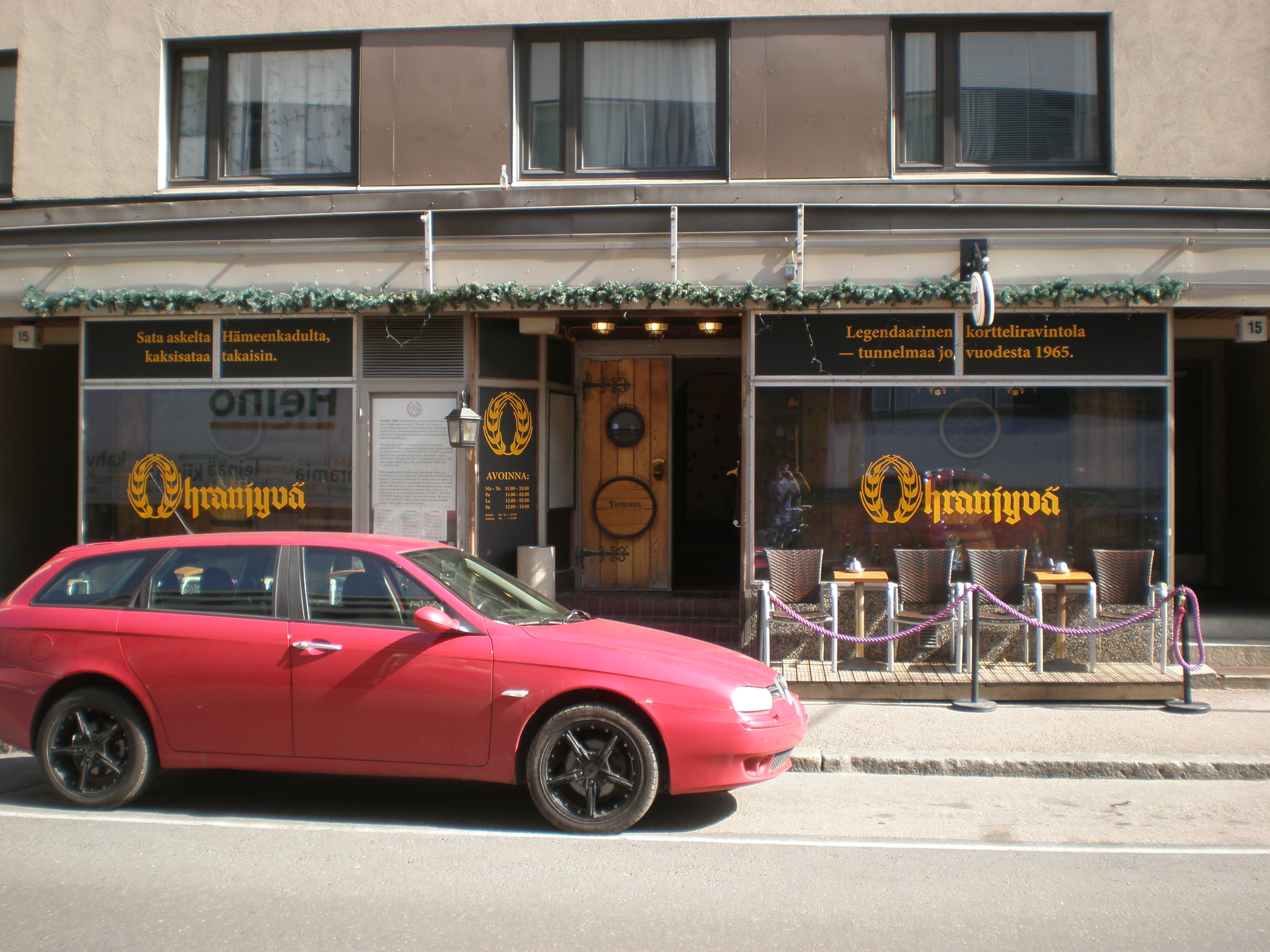
Restaurant Ohranjyvä.

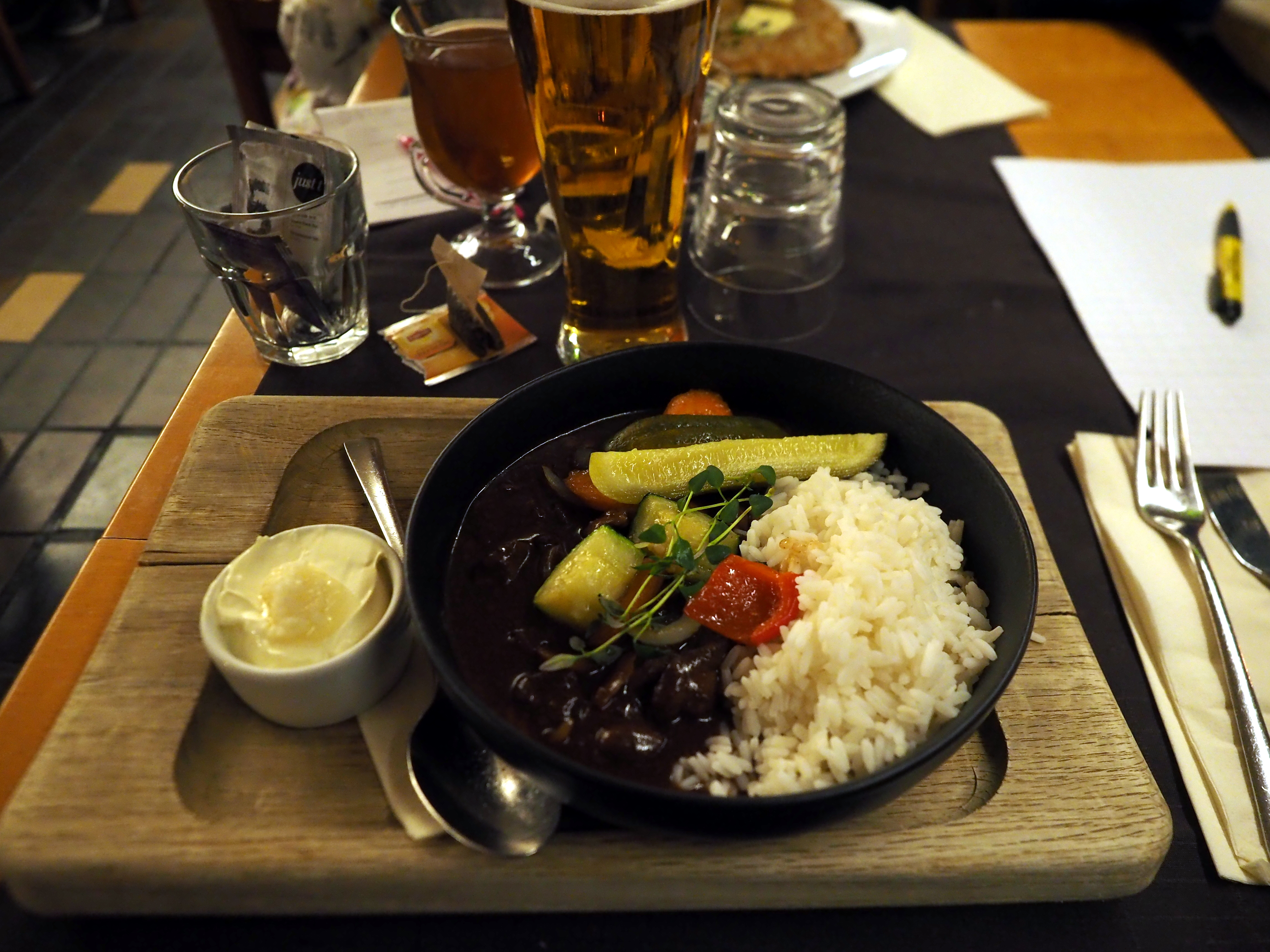
Puerto Ricon pannu, one of the restaurant's famous dishes.

Ohranjyvä (Finnish for "grain of barley") is a restaurant on Näsilinnankatu in central Tampere, Finland.

Ohranjyvä was founded by the Jussi Linkosuo, the master baker of the Linkosuo bakery in a former office on Näsilinnankatu in March 1965, just before the first Ice Hockey World Championships held in Finland. Ohranjyvä was among the first beer restaurants in Finland. In the early 1980s Ohranjyvä was moved under Alko's daughter company Arctia and then in 1997 to Scandic Hotels, which was only interested in keeping Arctia's hotels. The current owner of Ohranjyvä is Jaro Suoste's Jyväravintolat Oy.

The restaurant's famous dishes Puerto Ricon pannu ("pan of Puerto Rico") and Kanaa talon takaa ("chicken from behind the house") attracted customers even from further away. Ohranjyvä was also made famous by regular patrons working in the television industry, who still frequent the restaurant, which they call "O-Studio".

Ohranjyvä is the favourite bar of the reporter character Mauno Ahonen in the sketch comedy show Kummeli on YLE TV2.
