= Kiviapaja =

- village
- Location within Finland
- Coordinates: 61°42′N 028°45′E
- Country: Finland
- Municipality: Savonlinna

Kiviapaja is a small village in Savonlinna, Finland, near Sulkava. It was part of the municipality of Sääminki until 1973.

== Famous people ==
- Heikki Silvennoinen, actor and musician
- Arto Tiainen, skier
