= Hawash! =

Studio album by Jaakko Löytty
- Released: 1984 (LP), 2003 (CD)
- Recorded: Studio JJ, Tampere, 1984
- Genre: gospel, reggae
- Length: 41:42
- Label: just records, (2003, fg-naxos)
- Producer: Ippe Kätkä

Jaakko Löytty chronology
Laulu yhteisestä leivästä (1984)	Hawash! (1984)	Sinisen syvyys (1987)

Hawash! is a 1984 album by Finnish gospel musician Jaakko Löytty. It is his first album with clear African influences.

The title song was inspired by the Oromo musician Ali Mohammed Birra, whom Löytty met in 1976 during the Etiopiasafari tour. He met Birra in an Addis Abeba nightclub and bought his LP, which included a song about the River Hawash. Löytty wrote down a translation of the lyrics of the song on the inner sleeve of the album. This song later inspired him to write a song of the same name, the title song of this album.

== Track listing ==
- All words and music by Jaakko Löytty, arrangements by Jaakko Löytty and Ippe Kätkä.

Side one

No.	Title	Length
1.	"John Muafangeyo"	2.54
2.	"Orjalaiva (‘The slave ship’)"	3.59
3.	"Kuusimba (kaukana kotoa) (‘Kuusimba (far from home’))"	5.24
4.	"Kuuletko rummut? (‘Can you hear the drums’)"	4.52
5.	"Pieni pakolainen (‘The small refugee’)"	3.30

Side two

No.	Title	Length
6.	"Niin tulvii Hawash (‘The Hawash River is flooding’)"	2.54
7.	"Miljoonat jeesuslapset (‘Millions of Jesus children’)"	4.16
8.	"Lennä, leijani, lennä (‘Fly away my kite’)"	6.27
9.	"Taas on tänään (‘It’s today, again’)"	4.00
10.	"Valaiskoon (‘Let it shine’)"	3.26
Total length:		41.42

== Hawashband ==
- Jaakko Löytty — vocals, acoustic guitar
- Mikko Löytty — bass
- Sakari Löytty — drums, percussion
- Ippe Kätkä — drums, percussion
- Heikki Silvennoinen — guitars
- Jouko Laivuori — keyboards

=== Guests ===
- Taru Hallama — vocals
- Pave Maijanen — vocals
- Lucjan Czaplicki — saxophone
- Andrej Nowak — trumpet
- Jimmy Amupala — spoken word

=== Production ===
- Ippe Kätkä — producer, recording engineer, mixing
- Heikki Silvennoinen — recording engineer, mixing
- Jaakko Löytty, Tuomo Manninen, cover
- John Muafangejo, cover woodcut
