= Toisen päivän iltana =

Studio album by Jaakko Löytty
- Released: 1982
- Recorded: Studio JJ, Tampere, 1982
- Genre: soul, funk, reggae, gospel
- Length: 41:37
- Label: just records
- Producer: Heikki Silvennoinen

Jaakko Löytty chronology
Yhteys (1979)	Toisen päivän iltana (1982)	Laulu yhteisestä leivästä (1984)

Toisen päivän iltana (‘The night of the second day’) is a 1982 album by Finnish gospel musician Jaakko Löytty. It was released by Kirjapaja on its just records label. It was later released as a CD by fg-naxos in 2003.

== Original vinyl release ==
- Words and music by Jaakko Löytty, arrangements by Jaakko Löytty and Heikki Silvennoinen.

Side one

No.	Title	Length
1.	"Toisen päivän iltana (‘The night of the second day’)"	4.27
2.	"Ei päivääkään (‘Not a single day’)"	4.07
3.	"Pelkään sotaa (‘I’m afraid of the war’)"	3.10
4.	"Ehkä elämä voittaa (‘Perhaps life shall prevail’)"	3.52
5.	"Namibia"	3.44

Side two

No.	Title	Length
6.	"Martta (‘Martha’)"	3.07
7.	"Läpinäkyvinä (‘Transparent’)"	3.41
8.	"Hiljaisuus (‘Silence is the most beautiful music’)"	5.08
9.	"Elänkuolen kukka (‘A flower named I-live-I-die’)"	4.54
10.	"Martin Luther Kingin laulu (‘The song of Martin Luther King’)"	4.25

== J. Löyttyband ==
- Teppo Nuorva — guitar, background vocals
- Jaakko Knuutila — bass, background vocals
- Heikki Impiö — tenor saxophone, keyboards, background vocals
- Timo Harakka — flute, alto saxophone, background vocals
- Kyösti Lampinen — drums, percussion
- Jaakko Löytty— guitar, Oberheim, vocals

=== Friends ===
- Ismo Kätkä — percussion, kalimba, background vocals (A5)
- Heikki Silvennoinen — percussion, background vocals (A5)
- Pekka Salminen — Oberheim (A2, B5), organ, (A5)

=== Production ===
- Heikki Silvennoinen — producer, recording engineer
- Markus Heikkerö — cover art
