= Lännen-Jukka =

2006 studio album by J. Karjalainen

Studio album by J. Karjalainen
- Released: 25 October 2006
- Genre: Folk
- Length: 39:38
- Label: Poko Rekords

Lännen-Jukka ("Western-Jukka"), subtitled Amerikansuomalaisia lauluja / Finnish-American Folksongs, is a 2006 studio album by Finnish singer-songwriter J. Karjalainen. It was released on 25 October 2006.

== Background ==
Karjalainen's intent for the album was a "stripped-down" approach encompassing American folk music and the Finnish language, with references to his interest in Finnish American culture. The music combines Delta blues with traditional Finnish rekilaulu lyrics.

Karjalainen's favourite tracks on the album are "Oksakruunu", "Piupali Paupali" and "Amerikanlaiva".

The album production was the subject of a documentary by the Finnish public broadcaster Yle aired in 2007, entitled Lännen-Jukka Amerikassa (Lännen-Jukka in America).

== Commercial reception ==
Lännen-Jukka debuted at number three on the Official Finnish Album Chart, and stayed a total of 22 weeks in the top 40.

== Critical reception ==
The Finnish music magazine Soundi awarded Lännen-Jukka two stars.

== Track listing ==
No.	Title	Length
1.	"Oksakruunu" (Crown of Twigs)	2:46
2.	"Juomaripoika" (Drinker Boy)	1:40
3.	"Sormus se kulki itteksensä" (The Ring Fared on its Own)	2:41
4.	"Nancy ja Sally" (Nancy and Sally)	2:05
5.	"Minun kultani kaunis on" (My Darling is Beautiful)	2:05
6.	"Pontikkapoika" (Moonshine Boy)	2:49
7.	"Hoopon joulu" (Hobo's Christmas)	3:20
8.	"Kolmella kortilla" (With Three Cards)	3:02
9.	"Minä, Vili ja Charlie" (Me, Vili and Charlie)	4:24
10.	"Paimentyttö" (Shepherd Girl)	3:05
11.	"Piupali paupali"	2:00
12.	"Häntä" (Her)	2:12
13.	"Soo, soo!" (Tut-tut!)	2:10
14.	"Maailman Matti" (Matti of the World)	3:11
15.	"Amerikanlaiva" (Ship of America)	2:08

== Charts ==
Chart (2006)	Peak position
Finnish Albums (Suomen virallinen lista)	3
