= Etiopiasafari =

Single by Jaakko Löytty, Kaisu Löytty and Jukka Linkoheimo

from the album non-album single
- B-side: "Jumala on sama siellä ja täällä ['God is the same here and there']"
- Released: 1976
- Recorded: 18 February/4 April 1976; Helsinki, Tampere
- Genre: Gospel
- Length: 3:26
- Label: Nuorten keskus, NKS-7
- Songwriters: Jaakko Löytty, Kaisu Löytty, Jukka Linkoheimo
- Producers: Kare Ojaniemi, Seppo Lindell

"Etiopiasafari" is a 1976 single by Jaakko Löytty, Kaisu Löytty and Jukka Linkoheimo. It was released in support of their tour of Ethiopia the same year. It was released by Kirkon nuorisotyön keskus and Nuorten keskus, organisations of the Evangelical Lutheran Church of Finland.

During the trip to Ethiopia, the Löyttys and Linkoheimo met in an Addis Abeba nightclub an Oromo musician by the name of Ali Mohammed Birra, and bought from him his LP record. On that LP there is a song about the River Hawash, which later inspired Jaakko Löytty to write a song of the same name that became the title song of his 1984 LP Hawash!

== Songs ==
=== A. Etiopiaan – Safarilaulu ['To Ethiopia – A Safari Song'] ===
- Jukka Linkoheimo – vocals, 12 string guitar
  - Kari Chydenius – electric guitar
  - Kare Ojaniemi – bass
  - Petri Ojaniemi – organ
  - Heikki Chydenius – guitar
  - Arto Rauta – tambourine
  - Kaisla Ojaniemi – maracas
  - Jaakko Löytty – guitar
  - Kaisu Löytty – triangle
- Music: J. Linkoheimo, words: K. & J. Löytty
- Arrangement, conductor, producer: Kare Ojaniemi
- Recording engineer: Timo Ulkuniemi, 4 April 1976, Helsinki (recorded live)

=== B. Jumala on sama siellä ja täällä [‘God is the same here and there’] ===
- Jaakko löytty – vocals, guitar, harmonica
  - Kaisu Löytty – vocals
  - Sakari Löytty – drums
  - Jouko Laivuori – electric piano
  - Seppo Lindell – bass
  - Jukka Linkoheimo – vocals, guitar
- Music: J. Löytty, words: K. & J. Löytty
- Recording engineer – Seppo Lindell, Tampere, 18 February 1976
