= Laulu yhteisestä leivästä =

Studio album by Jaakko Löytty
- Released: 1984
- Recorded: Millbrook Studio, Helsinki, 1984
- Genre: gospel, reggae
- Length: 40:35
- Label: just records
- Producer: Pekka Ruuska

Jaakko Löytty chronology
| Toisen päivän iltana (1979) | Laulu yhteisestä leivästä (1984) | Hawash! (1984) |

Laulu yhteisestä leivästä is a 1984 album by Finnish gospel musician Jaakko Löytty. The album was commissioned by the Finnish Missionary Society for its 125th anniversary, which was celebrated in Helsinki in June 1984. The album is dedicated to the life work of Leonard Auala, first bishop of the ELCIN church in Namibia.

The guest vocalists on the album and the project include Taru Hallama, Jukka Leppilampi and Outi Terho.

The record was released by Kirjapaja on it label just records, together with the Finnish Missionary Society.

== Track listing ==
- All words and music by Jaakko Löytty; arrangements by the band, additional arrangements by Jaakko Löytty (vocals) and Jouko Laivuori (wind instruments).
- Lead vocals by Jaakko Löytty, except as indicated: A3, B6, B9.

Side one

| No. | Title | Lead vocalist | Length |
|---|---|---|---|
| 1. | "Toisiamme siunaten (‘Blessing each other’)" | | 4.40 |
| 2. | "Tämä maa (‘This earth’)" | | 5.26 |
| 3. | "Suuri kylväjä (‘The great sower’)" | Jukka Leppilampi | 4.32 |
| 4. | "Saamme kasvaa I (‘We are allowed to grow I’)" | | 3.30 |
| 5. | "Sadonkorjuulaulu (‘Harvest song’)" | | 4.27 |

Side two

| No. | Title | Lead vocalist | Length |
|---|---|---|---|
| 6. | "Hän on nälkäinen (‘He is hungry’)" | Taru Hallama | 3.37 |
| 7. | "Leivän siunaus (‘Blessing of the bread’)" | | 3.55 |
| 8. | "Tämä leipä (‘This bread’)" | | 4.55 |
| 9. | "Maassa rauha on (‘Peace on earth’)" | Outi Terho | 4.10 |
| 10. | "Saamme kasvaa II (‘We are allowed to grow II’)" | | 3.45 |
| Total length: | | | 42.47 |

== Musicians ==
- Jaakko Löytty — vocals, acoustic guitar
- Taru Hallama — vocals
- Jukka Leppilampi — vocals
- Outi Terho — vocals
- Jouko Laivuori — keyboards
- Mikko Löytty — bass
- Sakari Löytty — drums, percussion
- Pekka Ruuska — guitar

=== Guests ===
- Simo Salminen — trumpet, solo (A4)
- Tapani Rinne — soprano saxophone, tenor saxophone
- Markku Veijonsuo — trombone, bass tuba, solo (B5)

== Production ==
- Pekka Ruuska — producer, mixing
- Juha Heininen — recording engineer, mixing
- Tapsa Rantanen — kansi
- Hannu Bask — cover photo
- Pirjo Esko, Kari Kuitunen — photos of the vocalist
