= Marja-Liisa Vartio =

Finnish writer and poet

Marja-Liisa Orvokki Vartio
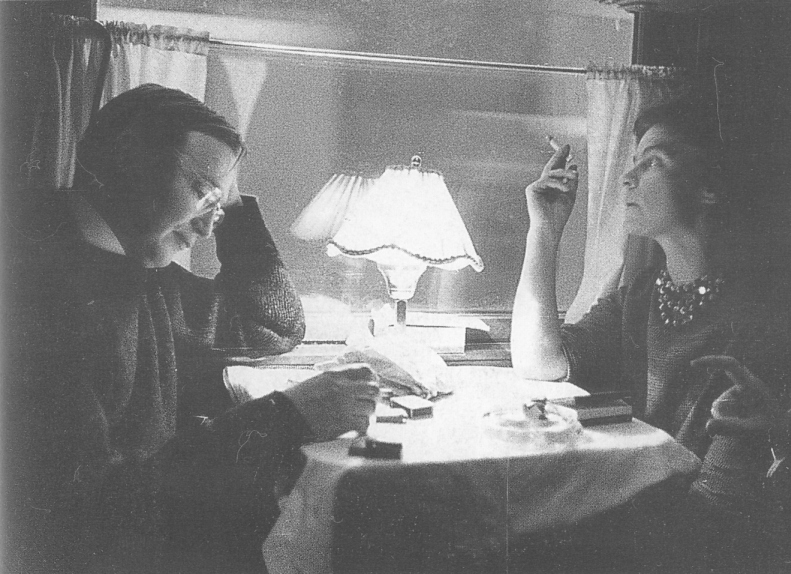
- With the author Paavo Haavikko

Marja-Liisa Orvokki Vartio (née Sairanen, 1955-1966 Haavikko; 11 September 1924 Sääminki, Finland – 17 June 1966 Savonlinna, Finland) was a Finnish poet and prose writer. Her writing career was short but influential. She was one of the leading modernist writers in Finland.

She studied art history and modern literature at the University of Helsinki. She married an art dealer in 1945 and became part of Helsinki's writing and artistic circles. Her first collections of poetry were published in 1952. In 1955 she married writer Paavo Haavikko. Around that time she started to write prose. Her prose is what she is most remembered for. Her work deals with dreams, fantasy and myth, and avoids personal comments and explanations.

Vartio published nine works of prose and poetry. Her works describe how the world changed in the twentieth century and the influence of this on human beings, especially on women. In her poetry she used folk literature as an inspiration. One of her novels, Hänen olivat linnut (The Parson's Widow) was published after her death. The main characters are the widow of a minister and her maid, who is portrayed as androgynous. The novel is considered central to Vartio's work.

Vartio died aged 41 of cancer. The Marja-Liisa Vartio Prize was set up in 1994 in her memory.
