= Kummelin Jackpot =

2006 Finnish film directed by Pekka Karjalainen

- Theatrical release poster
- Directed by: Pekka Karjalainen
- Starring: Heikki Silvennoinen; Timo Kahilainen
- Distributed by: Buena Vista International
- Release date: 17 February 2006
- Running time: 1h 33min
- Country: Finland
- Language: Finnish

Kummelin Jackpot (lit. 'Kummeli's Jackpot') is a 2006 Finnish comedy film directed by Pekka Karjalainen. It features the Kummeli comedy troupe.

== Cast ==
- Heikki Silvennoinen - Pertti 'Pera' Järvelä
- Timo Kahilainen - Pasi 'Japa' Jaatinen
- Heikki Vihinen - Anssi 'Spude' Suutarinen
- Heikki Hela - Seppo Sillantaus
- Riitta Havukainen - Maija Karvinen
- André Wickström - Antti Ruotsalainen
- Mari Turunen - Pirkko Sillantaus / Raili
- Miia Selin - Leila
- Mervi Takatalo - Annina Järvelä
- Ritva Roine - Paula
- Taneli Mäkelä - Eikka
- Risto Salmi - Rauno Järvelä
- Taina Elg - Mrs. Skogstedt
- Aake Kalliala - Keijo Mattila
