= Jaakko Löytty =

Finnish gospel musician

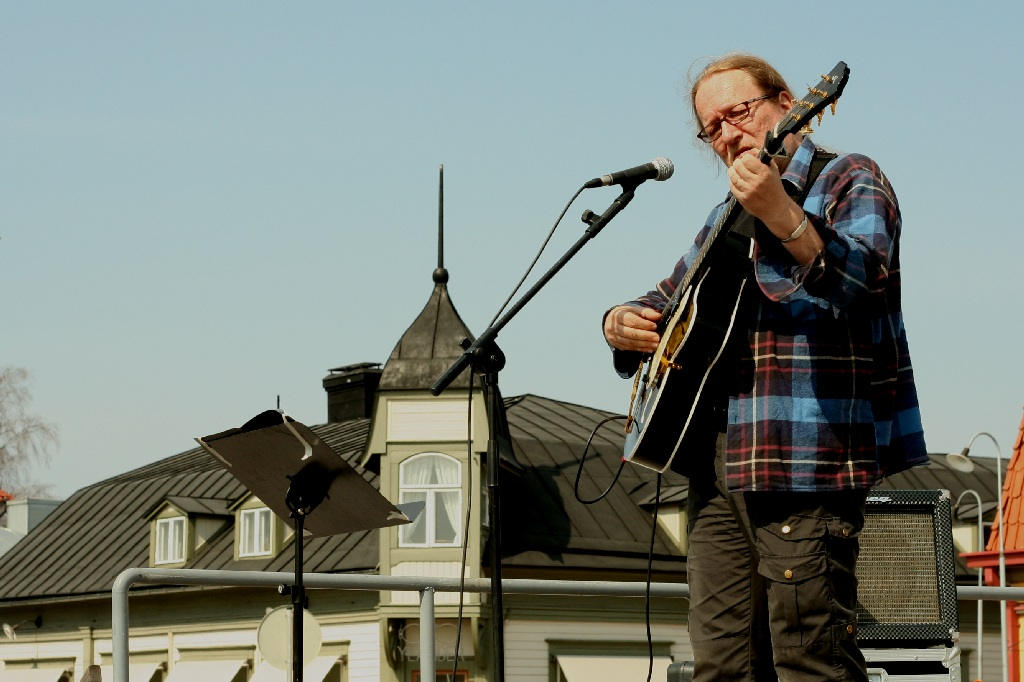
- Jaakko Löytty in 2006

Background information
- Born: 25 February 1955 (age 71)
- Origin: Ylöjärvi, Finland
- Genres: gospel
- Occupations: singer, songwriter
- Years active: 1974–present
- Website: Wideline – Jaakko Löytty

Jaakko Löytty (born 1955, Finland) is one of the most significant Finnish gospel musicians.

Löytty spent much of his youth, 12 years, in Namibia, where his parents, Seppo Löytty and Kirsti Löytty worked as missionaries with the Finnish Missionary Society. He went to the Swakopmund Finnish School. He himself has been a missionary with the FMS, to Senegal, where he developed church music and edited a hymnal in the local languages.

Löytty works for Herättäjä-Yhdistys, as a regional worker in Satakunta, Varsinais-Suomi and Tavastia. Since 2008, he has lived in Ylöjärvi, where he also lived as a teenager, after his family returned to Finland from Africa in 1968.

Löytty is married to author Kaija Pispa. His brothers Sakari Löytty and Mikko Löytty are also musicians. His youngest brother, Olli Löytty, is an academic.

Löytty's musical influences can be found from Americana, in the blues and country music, but also in reggae and in African music. He has composed two albums of music inspired by Senegalese music, Helsinki-Dakar (1991) and Norsunmaitoa (1995).

== Discography ==
- Asioita, joista vaietaan (1974)
- Jeesuksen ystäviä (1975)
- Etiopiasafari, single (1976)
- Kuule meitä (1977)
- Yhteys (1979)
- Toisen päivän iltana (1982)
- Laulu yhteisestä leivästä (1984)
- Hawash! (1984)
- Missä olenkaan (with Jouko Mäki-Lohiluoma and choir, 1986)
- Sinisen syvyys (1987)
- Lähtölaulut (1988)
- Jaakko Löytty elävänä (live, 1989)
- Vielä mä toivon – matkamiehen iltarukous (1990)
- Helsinki – Dakar (1991)
- Nicolas Sarr & Jaakko Löytty (1993)
- Kuuntelen (compilation, 1993)
- Norsunmaitoa (1995)
- Ristinkantajat – Pettuleipägospelia (1996)
- Omakuva (compilation, 1998)
- Tiikerisusi (1999)
- Nälkämaan lauluja (2001)
- Arkivirsiä (2003)
- Asioita joista vaietaan (re-release, 2002)
- Murhehuone (2005)
