= Sinisen syvyys =

Studio album by Jaakko Löytty
- Released: 1987 (LP)
- Recorded: Topsonic, Helsinki, October 1986
- Genre: gospel
- Length: 45.23
- Label: Profile Records

Jaakko Löytty chronology
Hawash! (1984)	Sinisen syvyys (1987)	Lähtölaulut (1987)

Sinisen syvyys ('The deepness of blue') is a 1987 album by Finnish gospel musician Jaakko Löytty, released by Profile Records.

== Track listing ==
- All words and music by Jaakko Löytty, except as indicated
- Arrangements by the band, vocals arranged by Jaakko Löytty.

Side one

No.	Title	Words and music	Length
1.	"Alkuhuuto ('A primal scream')"	Music by Jaakko Löytty, Kari Paukola, Sakari Löytty	0.52
2.	"Kuuntelen ('I’m listening')"		4.36
3.	"Katso ihmistä ('Ecce homo')"		5.58
4.	"Emme jaksa enää odottaa ('We can no longer wait')"		1.32
5.	"Vai mitä, herra Virtanen? ('Or what do you think, Mr. Virtanen?')"		8.45

Side two

No.	Title	Words and music	Length
6.	"Minä tulen ('I’m coming')"		3.23
7.	"Aika pysähtyy ('Time stops')"		4.50
8.	"Haavoittunut enkeli ('Wounded angel')"		5.34
9.	"Vielä yksi korkeaveisu ('One more song of songs')"		5.10
10.	"Kestä maa ('Hold on, earth')"	Word by Kaija Löytty, Jaakko Löytty	4.40
Total length:			45.23

== Musicians ==
- Jaakko Löytty – vocals, acoustic guitar
- Jouko Laivuori – keyboards
- Kari Paukola – guitar
- Mikko Löytty – bass
- Sakari Löytty – drums, marimba

Background vocals:

- Taru Hallama, Päivi Vanhatalo, Harri Rantanen, Mikko Löytty, Jouko Laivuori.

=== Production ===
- Timo Toikka, Sakari Löytty, Seppo Vanhatalo – mixing
- Tom Linkopuu – cover image
- Matti Karppinen – photograph
