= Jussi Raittinen =

Finnish musician (1943–2024)

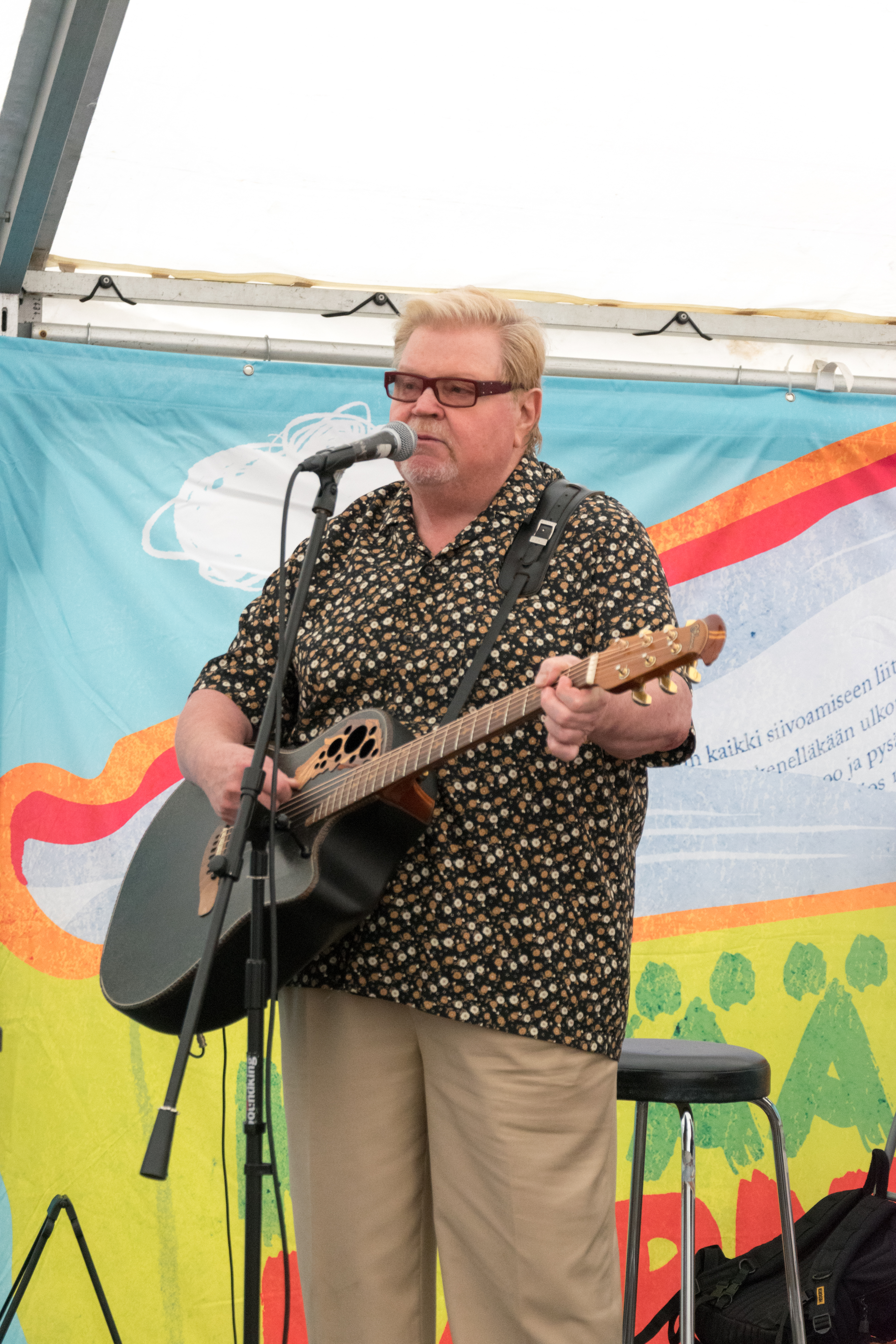
Raittinen in 2014

Jussi Raittinen (15 September 1943 – 13 February 2024) was a Finnish musician known for his solo career and, in addition to the band The Boys, as well as the lyricist-composer and arranger of many songs. He was the brother of musician Eero Raittinen (1944–2025).

== Career ==
Jussi Raittinen's younger brother Eero Raittinen was also a musician and an original member of The Boys. Their parents were Paavo Raittinen, a member of the Board of Directors of the Bank of Finland, and Rakel Jotuni, who was the niece of the writer Maria Jotuni.

Raittinen became a professional musician after serving in the army in 1966. In the 1960s, he was a member of the wireframe bands The Esquires and The Sounds.

In 1974, Raittinen won the Syksyn sävel song contest with the song "Metsämökin tonttu". He has also appeared in several music programmes, including as a presenter in the quiz show Triangeli on Yle TV2 in the 1990s.

In 2004, the Ministry of Education granted Raittinen a state artist pension in recognition of his meritorious work as a creative and performing artist. In November 2006, the President of the Republic awarded him the Order of the Lion of Finland.

Stadin Slangi ry chose Raittinen as the Stadin Kundi of the Year 2014 on Helsinki Day on 12 June 2014. In 2021, he was awarded the Lifetime Achievement Award at the National Children's Music Days. However, on February 13, 2024, he died from a long-lasting illness.

Two works about Raittinen's career have been published. In 2003, Muistan vielä vuonna -56 (I Still Remember in '56) appeared, and in 2014, Vanha rokkistara (The Old Rock Star).
