= Heikki Silvennoinen =

Finnish musician and actor (1954–2024)

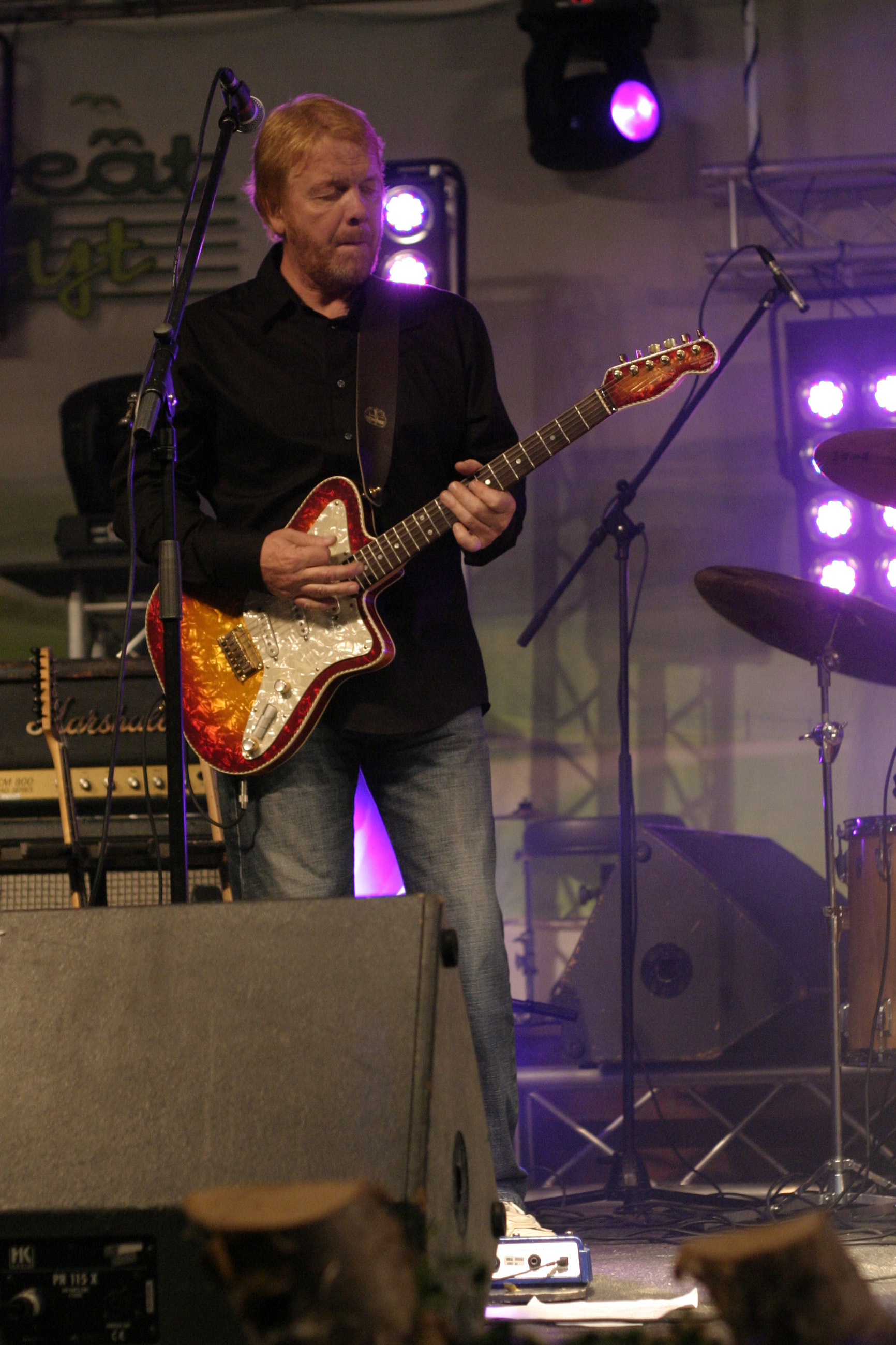
- Silvennoinen performing in 2007
- Born: Heikki Johannes Silvennoinen; 27 April 1954; Kiviapaja, Sääminki, Finland
- Died: 18 December 2024 (aged 70); Pälkäne, Finland
- Website: www.heikkisilvennoinen.fi

Heikki Johannes Silvennoinen (27 April 1954 – 18 December 2024) was a Finnish musician and an actor. He was a guitarist and a songwriter in several notable Finnish bands of the 1970s and 1980s, and also recorded solo albums. He was best known in Finland as a member of the comedy troupe Kummeli, whose eponymous television show debuted in 1991.

Silvennoinen ran a production company called Pirkka-Hämeen Apina & Gorilla Oy ("Ape and Gorilla of Pirkka-Häme Inc."). With his fellow comedian, Timo Kahilainen, he owned Porkkana Ryhmä Oy ("Carrot Group Inc."), responsible for Kummeli's output.

== Life and career ==
=== Tabula Rasa ===
Silvennoinen was born in Kiviapaja, Sääminki on 27 April 1954. As a young boy he admired the music of Eric Clapton, B.B. King, Cream and Jimi Hendrix. He learned to play the guitar and formed a rock band called Tabula Rasa, one of the most important 1970s progressive rock bands in Finland. When the group released their debut album, Silvennoinen started to realize that music was likely to be his primary occupation. His later career has not been associated with progressive rock, but during the Tabula Rasa years he composed almost all the songs that the group recorded. After Tabula Rasa came to an end, Silvennoinen joined Mikko Alatalo's band.

=== 1980s ===
In the 1980s, Silvennoinen became a professional producer and collaborated with many significant bands. He played guitar in bands called Frendz and Catwalk, and in 1987 he formed a group called Q.Stone with singer Mikko Kuustonen. This band was English singing blues-rock group that released four relatively well-received albums. Kuustonen decided to leave the group and concentrate on his solo career. Silvennoinen continued to play the guitar on his albums.

=== Solo albums ===
In the beginning of the 1990s Silvennoinen released his first solo album, Mature And Cool. It included his own songs and a cover of Blind Willie Reynolds song "Outside Woman Blues" (popularized by Cream). His second solo album, Bobcat, was released in 1997. It includes Silvennoinen's own song "Sun Don't You Shine" and a cover of "Fire" by Jimi Hendrix. On the sleeve notes of the album he thanks his idols, not just Hendrix and Clapton, but also Peter Green and Stevie Ray Vaughan (he has personally met Vaughan and Clapton). His next album, Sweet Surrender, was released two years later. In 2000 Silvennoinen founded his own label and released the album Blues Blue Sky, which contains mostly old blues songs. The album Miehet kaatuu was released in 2003, and is his only album containing lyrics in Finnish.

=== Kummeli ===
In the beginning of the 1990s Silvennoinen became more popular in Finland due to the television show Kummeli. Of the four-member group, Silvennoinen had the largest number of different roles (including reporter Mauno Ahonen, summer cottage neighbour Martti Mielikäinen, Matti Näsä who complains about everything, and officer Jaakko Parantainen who is concerned about environmental questions). The show and group had phenomenal success in Finland in 1994, when they also made their first stage appearances and toured all of Finland. After that Kummeli has continued its existence in various forms. Silvennoinen has stated that their best gag was the one about Lada summit, since it gave an inspiration for the real Lada summit event that still takes place yearly in Finland. The most lucrative song – from the point of view of royalties – Silvennoinen ever wrote was "Jumankauta juu nääs päivää" that he claims to have done in 20 minutes. It features the Kummeli character Matti Näsä singing about his car, a Toyota Mark II. Despite the popularity of Kummeli, Silvennoinen also worked as a janitor in the late 1990s.

=== 2000s ===
In 2002 Silvennoinen formed the group SF-Blues with well-known Finnish musicians Pepe Ahlqvist (harp, vocal) and Dave Lindholm (guitar, vocal), with all members sharing songwriting duties on their first album. In the following year, singer Erja Lyytinen replaced Lindholm for next album. In 2005 guitarist Jukka Tolonen and singer Mikko Kuustonen joined the group in order to make their second album, Joutomailla. Other musicians that have been involved with the band include singer Eero Raittinen and keyboardist Jukka Gustavson. In the 2000s Silvennoinen did voice acting work for some children movie characters needing Finnish overdubs.

=== Death ===
Silvennoinen died in his sleep after a long illness at his home in Pälkäne, Finland, on the morning of 18 December 2024. He was 70 years old.

== Discography ==
=== Solo albums ===
- Mature And Cool (1992)
- Bobcat (1997)
- Sweet Surrender (1999)
- Blues Blue Sky (2000)
- Miehet kaatuu (2003)

=== Tabula Rasa ===
- Tabula Rasa (1975)
- Ekkedien Tanssi (1976)

=== Q.Stone ===
- Q. stone (1988)
- Pink on blue (1990)
- Q. stone III (1992)
- No substitute (1993)

=== Kummeli ===
- Artisti maksaa (1994)
- Kummeli Stories Soundtrack (1995)

=== SF-Blues ===
- SF-Blues (2002)
- Joutomailla (2005)
- Man – Be Careful! (2007)

== Filmography ==
As writer, actor or voice actor:

- Kummeli Stories (1995) – screenwriter, actor
- Kummeli Kultakuume (1997) – actor
- Johtaja Uuno Turhapuro – pisnismies (1998) – actor
- Kummelin Jackpot (2006) – actor
- Autot (2006) – voice actor
- Karvakamut (2006) – voice actor
- Kummeli Alivuokralainen (2008) – actor
- Ralliraita (2009) – actor
- Autot 2 (2011) – voice actor
- Autot 3 (2017) – voice actor

=== Television programs ===
- Q-Klubi (1991–1992) – actor
- Kummeli (1991–) – writer, producer, actor
- Lihaksia ja luoteja (1996) – writer, producer, actor
- Aatami & Beetami (1997) – actor
- Lääkärit tulessa (1998) – actor
- Herra Heinämäen Lato-orkesteri (1999) – narrator
- Mankeli (2000–2001) – writer, producer, actor
- Jurismia! (2002) – actor
- Beatlehem (TV-movie, 2003) – actor
- Nyrölä 3 (2004) – actor
- Hopeanuolet (2007) – actor
