= Kummeli: Kultakuume =

1997 Finnish film directed by Matti Grönberg

Kummeli Goldrush
- Original Finnish film poster
- Finnish: Kummeli Kultakuume
- Directed by: Matti Grönberg
- Written by: Heikki Vihinen; Timo Kahilainen
- Produced by: Markus Selin
- Starring: Heikki Vihinen; Timo Kahilainen; Heikki Silvennoinen; Heikki Hela; Vesa-Matti Loiri; Jukka Puotila; Mari Turunen; Kari Hietalahti
- Cinematography: Petri Rossi
- Edited by: Kauko Lindfors
- Distributed by: Finnkino
- Release date: 1997
- Running time: 92 minutes
- Country: Finland
- Language: Finnish

Kummeli Kultakuume (English: Kummeli Goldrush) is a 1997 Finnish comedy film starring Heikki Hela, Heikki Silvennoinen, Timo Kahilainen and Heikki Vihinen, stars of the Finnish sketch-series Kummeli. This was their second cinema-release after 1995's Kummeli: Stories. Kultakuume has a singular plot whereas Stories was composed of long-sketches.

The film's sequel was being planned but eventually shelved for the time being due to Heikki Silvennoinen's death on 18 December 2024.

== Plot ==
The story is set in 1984. Elmeri Hautamäki (Silvennoinen) is a man who has lived his entire life in a mental institution. He escapes with his homosexual nurse Janne-Petteri Broman (Hela) and is joined by the Kagelberg twins Jönssi and Dille (Vihinen and Kahilainen) on a quest for the hidden gold treasure of his father Kyrpä-Jooseppi Hautamäki, who was killed by a deserting German Waffen-SS soldier Peter North (Jukka Puotila) back in 1944, in Lapland. Their escape leads them to be pursued by not only the Mental Institute's doctors Rasikangas and Kulokoski (Mari Turunen and Kari Hietalahti) but by the police as well.

The motley crew arrives at Elmeri's father's site but are unable to extract a reasonable amount of gold from the river. At the dead of night Jönssi stumbles on a buried German motorbike and the bodies of two dead SS troopers. They find out that the motorbike's sidecar carries a chest full of Third Reich gold.

Later a police pursuit lands the group on the grounds of gay baron Eugen von Lahtinen (Vesa-Matti Loiri) during a poetry-themed spring celebration. The gold exchanger that the group goes to, Karl-Heinz Rummenigge (Oiva Lohtander), turns out to be working for a secret Nazi organization. Through this contact Peter North, still alive and well, learns that Elmeri has found his gold and he returns to Finland. When Hautamäki returns to exchange the rest of the gold for cash he ends up in hand-to-hand combat with North. Hautamäki wins the fight (by asking North for a cigarette).

The gold is split among the good guys, Broman marries baron von Lahtinen, becoming the mistress of his estate. Jönssi becomes the owner of the food-processing plant which he and his brother were fired from at the beginning of the film. Dille becomes a professor at the University of Tampere. Elmeri marries a call girl named Vanessa and has many children. He takes Peter North's name in order to stay out of the mental asylum. Peter North ends up locked up in a mental institution under Hautamäki's name for the rest of his life.

== Characters ==
- Elmeri Hautamäki is the son of the prospector Kyrpä-Jooseppi Hautamäki. Elmeri has lived his entire life in a mental institution. His violent hormone activity makes him very unpredictable, he also appears to possess super-human strength, easily throwing several heavy opponents with one hand while enraged over not being offered a cigarette. However, Elmeri speaks in perfect literary Finnish and is usually very well behaved.
- Janne-Petteri Broman is a homosexual nurse who Elmeri convinces to help him escape when he shows him the gold flakes that were recovered from his father's excrement. At first Broman does not take kindly to Jönssi and Dille who Elmeri befriends after Broman's SEAT Málaga crashes with their Dodge Aspen. Mirroring a common Finnish stereotype, Broman's speech is sometimes littered with Swedish utterances.
- James "Jönssi" Kagelberg is the taller of the Kagelberg twins, their mother died when the two were just children and they were abandoned by their father. The state tried to reintroduce the twins into society starting from the 1970s, with very little success. Jönssi is fond of Finnish iskelmä songs and is heard singing them throughout the movie. Jönssi is named after James Dean.
- Dean "Dille" Kagelberg is the shorter and the crosseyed one of the Kagelberg twins. Dille often confronts people with philosophical anecdotes. He is named after Dean Martin and not James Dean like his brother. He is known for his catchphrase Legendaarista meaning Legendary.

Example of use:
-This is a BX windshield? How much did it cost?
-Nothing!
-Legendary.

- Peter North is a former Nazi officer who had to leave a treasure of gold behind him during the Lapland War, and decades after returns to seek for it.

== Shelved sequel ==
Heikki Silvennoinen died on 18 December 2024 due to various health problems. Timo Kahilainen revealed during a live broadcast on Yle in memory of Silvennoinen that a sequel to the film had been planned with Solar Films. The sequel's script was ready and financing was already on the pipeline. Solar Films' executive producer Markus Selin stated that the sequel would be shelved for the time being. Timo Kahilainen told Iltalehti that even though he could not say anything for certain about the film's fate, he believed that it would not be made. He commented on the matter: "It's really clear that of course it can't be made. So no, it will not be made. If we don't have Elmeri Hautamäki in the movie, how could we make it?"
