= The Boys (Finnish band) =

Finnish rock band (1964–2023)

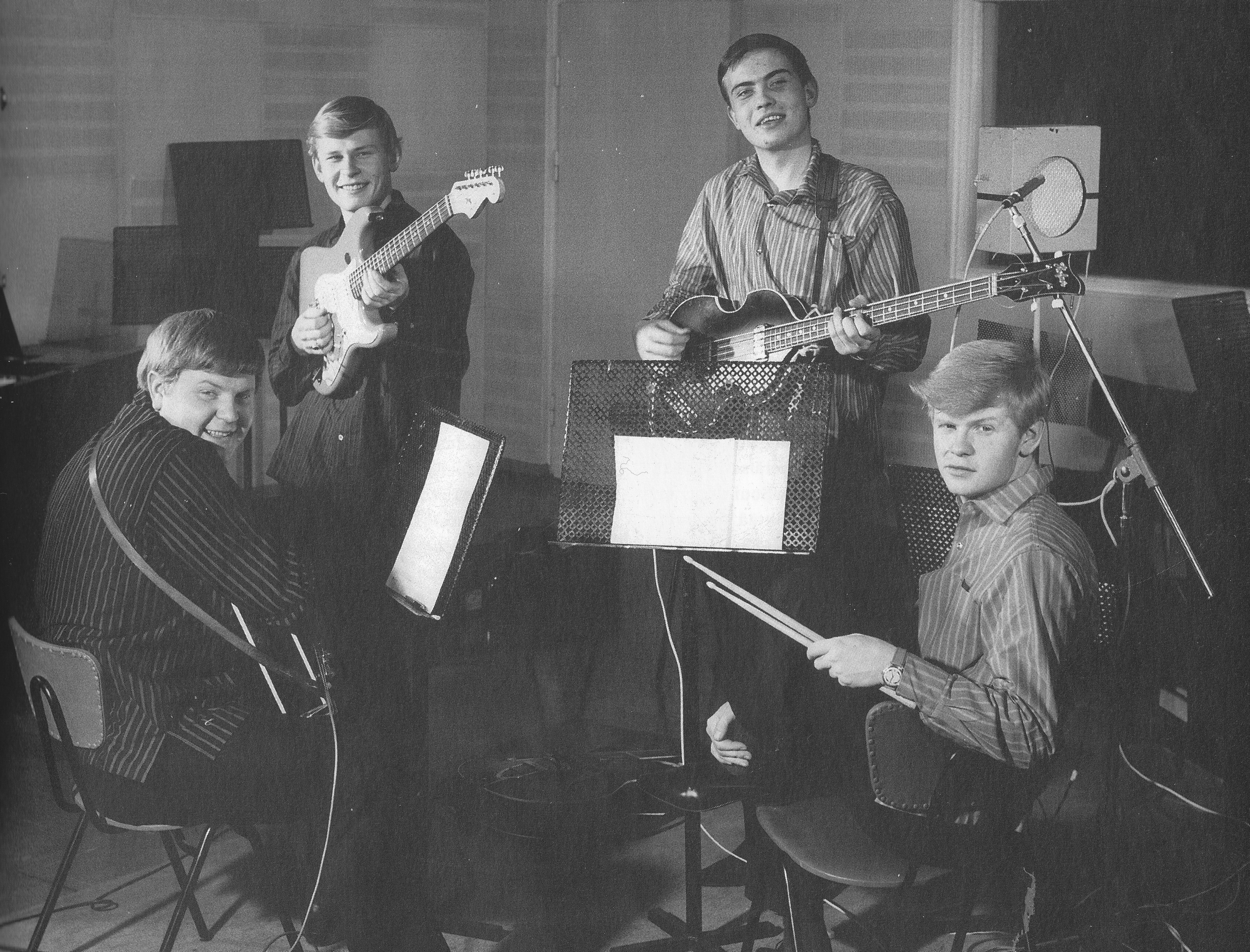
Eero and Jussi & The Boys at Akku studio

The Boys, also known as Eero, Jussi & The Boys or Jussi & The Boys, was a Finnish rock and roll band active from 1964 to 2023. Founded by brothers Jussi and Eero Raittinen, the band's lineup included a total of 37 members over nearly six decades. Several of them subsequently found success in other bands or as solo artists, earning The Boys the nickname "University of Finnish Rock and Roll".

== History ==
Eero, Jussi & The Boys was founded in April 1964 by Jussi and Eero Raittinen, formerly of the instrumental guitar rock bands The Esquires and The Sounds. Its first lineup consisted of Jussi Raittinen (rhythm guitar, vocals), Eero Raittinen (drums, vocals), Kaj Westerlund (lead guitar) and Harri Sjöberg (bass). Their debut single consisted of Finnish-language cover versions of The Beatles' "All My Loving" ("Kaikki rakkauteni") and "Do You Want to Know a Secret" ("Salaisuuteni"). The band also enjoyed early success with a cover of Roy Orbison's "Oh, Pretty Woman" ("Kaunis nainen"). After Eero Raittinen left the band for a solo career in 1968, they shortened their name to Jussi & The Boys.

After a hiatus in recording in the late 1960s, The Boys found commercial success during the first half of the 1970s that culminated in winning the Syksyn sävel television song contest in 1974 with the song "Metsämökin tonttu", which became the band's most successful single, peaking at #4 in the Finnish chart and spending five months in the Top 20. The albums Mä tahdon rokata and Pojat asialla were certified gold in 1974 and 1975, respectively. After dwindling record sales during the latter half of the decade, Eero Raittinen rejoined the band in 1980, and The Boys - now consisting of a nucleus of Jussi and Eero Raittinen and guitarist Eero Lupari - found popularity amongst a younger audience through school concert tours across Finland during the 1980s and 1990s.

Eero Raittinen quit the band again at the turn of the millennium, and for the remainder of its career, the group again became Jussi & The Boys. Eero Lupari ended his 35-year tenure with the band in 2015. The Boys released their last album, Rokaten tieni meen, in 2023. At the end of their final concert in Helsinki on 17 November 2023, Jussi Raittinen announced his retirement. He passed away three months later on February 13, 2024. Eero Raittinen passed away on July 16, 2025.

== Members ==
=== Final lineup ===
- Jussi Raittinen – vocals, guitar, bass
- Tuomas Metsberg – guitar, vocals
- Jari Metsberg – guitar
- Eero "Rudy" Ryynänen – drums
- Lasse Sirkko – bass

=== Notable former members ===
- Eero Raittinen (drums, vocals, 1964-1968, 1980-1999)
- Pekka Tammilehto (guitar, vocals, 1975-1980)
- Pekka Pohjola (bass, 1969-1970)
- Eero Koivistoinen (saxophone, 1968-1969)
- Olli Haavisto (guitar, 1986-1996)

== Discography ==
- Numero 1 (1965)
- Numero 2 (1966)
- Eero ja Jussi 1960–1970 (1970)
- Mä tahdon rokata (1973)
- Pojat asialla (1974)
- Kantri & rock (1975)
- Kehä kaartuu (1975)
- Mennään melomaan (1976)
- Lapsilta kielletty (1979)
- Hämeentie 38 (1980)
- Numero 3 (1986)
- Parhaat 1973–76 (1989)
- 3 kitaraa (1991)
- Kuoppainen tie (1995)
- 20 suosikkia – Kaunis nainen (1995)
- Shake! (2002)
- Pop Show (2004) (feat. Agents & Jorma Kääriäinen)
- Suomi-Rockin Korkeakoulu (2004)
- Kerran vielä, pojat! (2014)
- Unioninkatu 45 (2018)
- Rokaten tieni meen (2023)
