= The Amazing Colossal Band =

1995 studio album by Laika & the Cosmonauts

Studio album by Laika & the Cosmonauts
- Released: 1995
- Genre: Surf rock, instrumental rock
- Label: Upstart
- Producer: Laika & the Cosmonauts

Laika & the Cosmonauts chronology
Instruments of Terror (1993)	The Amazing Colossal Band (1995)	Zero Gravity (1996)

The Amazing Colossal Band is an album by the Finnish band Laika & the Cosmonauts, released in 1995. It was one of many instrumental rock albums released in 1995, part of a mid-1990s trend that encompassed lounge, surf, and space rock styles.

It was the band's second album to be released in the United States. Laika & the Cosmonauts supported it by playing with, among others, Polara and El Vez on a North American tour.

== Production ==
An instrumental band made up of some of Finland's foremost studio musicians, Laika & the Cosmonauts differed from many of the surf revivalist acts of the mid-1990s by neither sticking to strictly older production techniques, nor by applying a layer of ironic distance to the songs. For Amazing, the band upped the percentage of original material to about 75%, compared to Instruments of Terror's reliance on around 50% covers.

== Critical reception ==
Professional ratings
Review scores
Source	Rating
AllMusic	4/5 stars
The Province	3.5/4 stars

The Washington City Paper thought that "Amazing's standouts include 'Tantrum', which features bongo drums, spy-movie-soundtrack bass runs, and the cheesy organ trills of keyboardist/guitarist Matti Pitsinki; 'The A-Treatment', a composition that mixes sitarlike guitar with funky bass and organ parts; and 'Aztec Two-Step', built around Mikko Lanikinen’s plucky guitar." Trouser Press concluded that the album "has moments of charm ... but it’s not a good sign that the best moments are again soundtrack covers—'The Avengers' and John Barry’s 'The Ipcress File'."

Tucson Weekly wrote that, "while a couple of tracks also court the attention of Esquivel-enamored lounge lizards (pop an umbrella in your cocktail while 'Exposé' slithers past), most of the originals have bucketsful of sand and salt to spare." The Washington Post determined that, "in contrast to [Dick] Dale's often relentless surf-guitar assault, the Finns offer a more varied palette, contrasting Lankinen's slow, distorted guitar lines against the rhythm section's brisk, staccato backing and alternating lazy, atmospheric numbers to jacked-up, jittery workouts."

Guitar Player deemed the album "party music supreme," writing that "Lankinen plays with a big, haunting twang, fast tremolo, and rad wang-bar quiver." The Province praised the "romping sense of humor." The Los Angeles Times opined that, "while many of the tracks boast an intricacy and quirkiness worthy of a Nino Rota or Ennio Morricone, the group also rocks with a vicious edge on the biker movie soundtrack tune 'Skater Dater'."

AllMusic wrote that, "because Laika & the Cosmonauts are pure professionals in their job, they have remained the high artistic level in their music, even though The Amazing Colossal Band can be considered as party music to dance to." The New Haven Register listed the album among the 100 best of the 1990s.

== Track listing ==
No.	Title	Length
1.	"Delayrium"
2.	"Floating"
3.	"Tantrum"
4.	"The A-Treatment"
5.	"The Ipcress File"
6.	"Global Village"
7.	"The Avengers"
8.	"Exposé"
9.	"Aztec Two-Step"
10.	"The Down-Winders"
11.	"Café Equator"
12.	"O.C.C.C. (Oahu Community Correctional Center)"
13.	"Get Carter"
14.	"The Man from H.U.A.C."
15.	"Azure Blue"
16.	"Intro"
17.	"Skater Dater"
