= Olli Haavisto =

Finnish musician (born 1954)

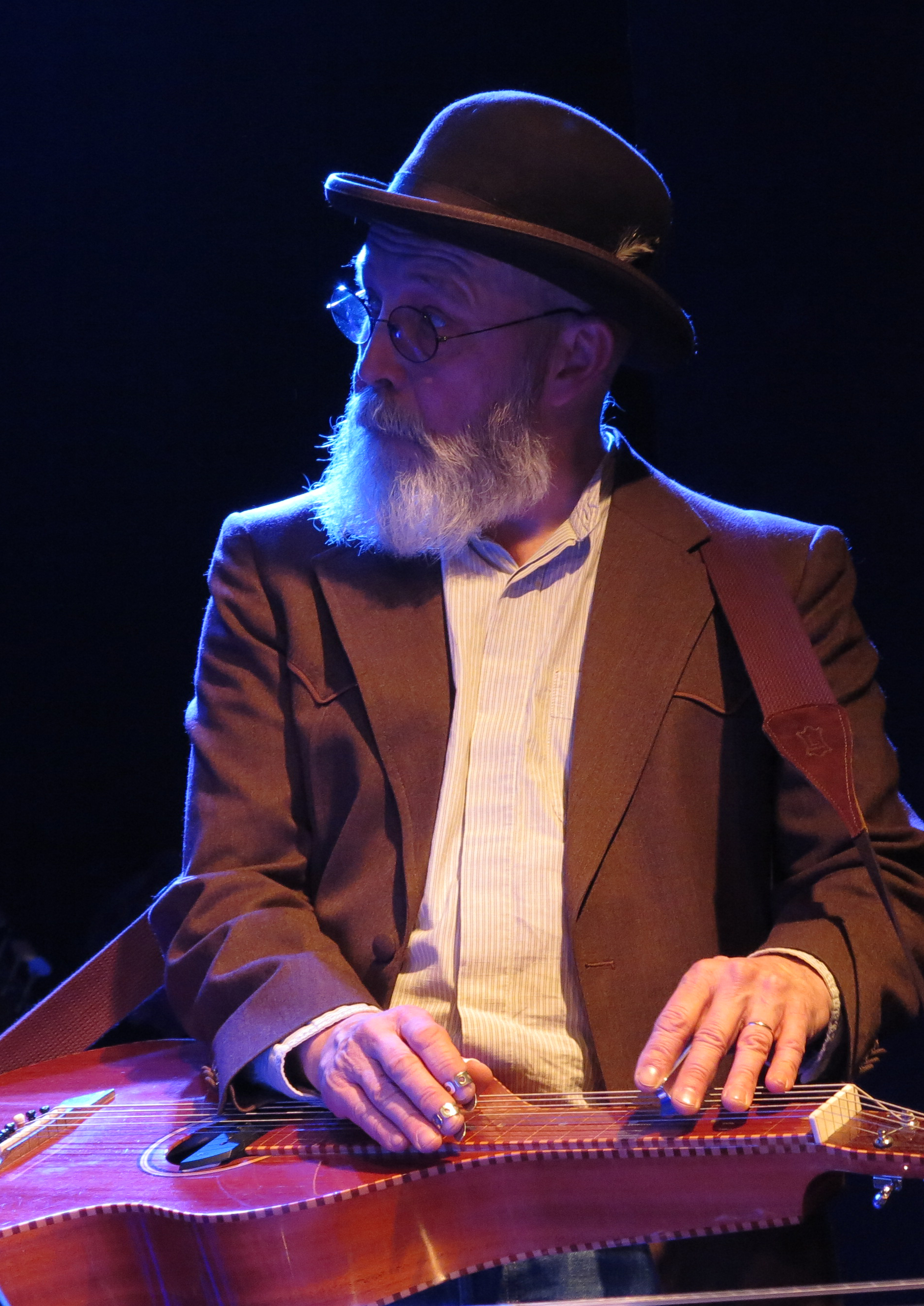
- Olli Haavisto in his and his brother's Fifty-Sixty Concert at the Tavastia Club, November 2014

Background information
- Born: 30 May 1954 (age 72); Pori, Finland
- Origin: Espoo, Finland
- Genres: rock, country, blues, roots music
- Occupation: musician
- Years active: 1973–present

Olli Haavisto (born 30 May 1954) is a Finnish musician best known for playing the pedal steel guitar and the guitar. He is one of the most respected pedal steel guitarists in Finland, and he has worked as a session musician for numerous Finnish artists. He has played on ca. 1,850 songs on ca. 600 albums. He has also acted as producer on ca. 50 albums. In addition to this, he has played ca. 5,000 gigs.

== Early life ==
Haavisto was born in Pori. He studied the flute in the Espoo Music Institute during 1968–73. He also studied musicology and the English language at Helsinki University for five years in the 1970s.

== Career as a musician ==
Haavisto's first band was Vanha Isäntä, founded in 1973, which the same year won the Finnish championship of pop bands, playing an entirely acoustic set, mainly traditional songs from the British Isles. The band soon oriented itself towards Americana, mainly bluegrass and country music. Now there was a demand for Haavisto's pedal steel guitar.

Haavisto bought his first pedal steel guitar in 1976, and played a session with it no less than a fortnight later. The song was called “Äidin ihmekauha” (“The Wonderful Soupstone”, written by Shel Silverstein), sung by Aimo Jaara, with Finnish lyrics by Jukka Virtanen.

Since then, Haavisto has played with e.g. Jim Pembroke Band, J. Karjalainen & Mustat Lasit, Mikko Kuustonen’s band, Mikko Alatalo’s band, The Boys, Dallas Wayne & The Dimlights, Kari Tapio’s band, Hoedown, Farangs, Ninni Poijärvi’s band, Band'o, Jorma Kääriäinen’s band, Topi Sorsakoski’s band, Country Boys, Meatballs, North Country Far and Tuomari Nurmio & Kylmät Todistajat.

Haavisto released his first solo album, Pysäkkimusiikkia, in 2002. His second album, Collisions, came out in 2020. Both were released by Texicalli Records. The musicians on the latter album include e.g. Pepe Ahlqvist, Jukka Gustavson, Seppo Sillanpää, Timo Kämäräinen, Verneri Pohjola, Tuomo Prättälä, and of course, his younger brother Janne Haavisto.

== Family ==
Olli Haavisto's father Jukka Haavisto was a well-known musician in Finland, and so is his brother, drummer Janne Haavisto, who is 10 years younger than him. Their sister Susanna Haavisto is known both as a singer and an actress.

In 2015, Haavisto was granted an artist's pension by the state of Finland.
