= Arctic Circle (TV series) =

Finnish-German crime drama television series (2018–2023)

- Ivalo
- Genre: Crime drama; Nordic noir
- Created by: Olli Haikka; Petja Peltomaa; Joona Tena; Jón Atli Jónasson
- Directed by: Hannu Salonen
- Starring: Iina Kuustonen; Maximilian Brückner; Pihla Viitala; Clemens Schick; Joi Johannsson; Susanna Haavisto; Venla Ronkainen
- Composer: Vladislav Delay
- Country of origin: Finland; Germany
- Original languages: Finnish; English; Russian
- No. of seasons: 4
- No. of episodes: 27

Production
- Production locations: Ivalo, Finland; Helsinki, Finland; Murmansk, Russia
- Running time: 50 minutes
- Production companies: Yellow Film & TV; Bavaria Film

Original release
- Network: Elisa Viihde; Yle
- Release: 2018 – January 1, 2025

Arctic Circle (Finnish: Ivalo) is a Finnish-German crime drama television series that premiered on Finnish streaming service Elisa Viihde at Christmas 2018 and later on Yle. The series stars Iina Kuustonen, Maximilian Brückner, Pihla Viitala, Clemens Schick and Susanna Haavisto.

Arctic Circle is the first co-production between Finland's Yellow Film & TV and Germany's Bavaria Film, picked up for world distribution by Paris-based Lagardère Studios. The series was created by Yellow Film & TV CEO Olli Haikka and Head of Drama Petja Peltomaa with Joona Tena who shares the writing credit with Iceland's experienced Jón Atli Jónasson. Arctic Circle is directed by Finnish-born, Germany-based Hannu Salonen, Juha Lankinen and Jussi Hiltunen.

== Plot ==
Set in an icy Finnish Lapland, in series 1, Finnish police officer Nina Kautsalo (Iina Kuustonen) finds a nearly dead prostitute in a cabin in the wilderness. The case takes a surprising turn when a deadly virus is found in the prostitute's body. Nina and German virologist Thomas Lorenz (Maximilian Brückner) start investigating the case.

== Cast and characters ==
- Iina Kuustonen as Nina Kautsalo
- Pihla Viitala as Marita Kautsalo
- Venla Ronkainen as Venla Kautsalo
- Susanna Haavisto as Elina Kautsalo
- Inka Kallén as Sari Nikander (S1 — S2)
- Kari Ketonen as Jaakko Stenius
- Mikko Leppilampi as Esko Kangasniemi
- Taneli Mäkelä as Reino Ylikorpi

=== Season 1 ===
- Maximilian Brückner as Thomas Lorenz
- Jari Virman as Raunola
- Clemens Schick as Marcus Eiben
- Joi Johansson as Jens Mathiesen
- Janne Kataja as Niilo Aikio
- Maria Ylipää as Gunilla Lorenz
- Kari Hietalahti as Hamari
- Kristo Salminen as Reidar Hamari
- Alina Tomnikov as Lana

=== Season 2 ===
- Maxim Busel as Victor Zujev
- Mikko Nousiainen as Toni Kajanne
- Wenla Reimaluoto as Aava Lahti
- Walt Klink as Justin Merriman
- John Finn as Gordon Merriman
- Andrius Paulavicius as Nikolai Kurakin

=== Season 4 (unique) ===
- Ilkka Villi as Jarmo
- Roosa Söderholm as Stina Nurmi
- Arttu Kapulainen as Tuomas Hovatta
- Matti Onnismaa as Ossi Kangasniemi
- Sinikka Mokkila as Aila Männistö
- Lily Jääsvuo as Santeri Kautsalo
- Sofia Jääsvuo as Santeri Kautsalo
- Jarkko Pajunen as Toikka
- Kreeta Salminen as Helena Kirkinen
- Jakob Öhrman as Stepan Nitko
- Kreeta Salminen as Helena Kirkinen
- Lena Meriläinen as Dr. Satu Kela
- Elena Spirina as Polina Rotkova
- Kati Outinen as Raakel Hovatta
- Alexandra Asherie as Lotte Venter
- Veikka Puumalainen as Timo
- Charlotte Bradley as Ella Bolmaro
- Artur Kukov as Sasha Ragulin

== Episodes ==
Series	Episodes	Originally released	
Series	Episodes	First released	Last released
1	10	21 December 2018	4 January 2019
2	6	19 December 2021	2 January 2022
3	6	4 October 2023	8 November 2023
4	5	1 January 2025	1 January 2025

=== Season 1 (2018-19) ===
No. overall	No. in season	Title	Directed by	Written by	Original release date
1	1	"Cellar" (Kellari)	Hannu Salonen	Unknown	21 December 2018
2	2	"Traces in the Snow" (Jäljet lumessa)	Hannu Salonen	Unknown	21 December 2018
3	3	"The Storm Rises" (Myrsky nousee)	Hannu Salonen	Unknown	21 December 2018
4	4	"Eye for an Eye" (Silmä silmästä)	Hannu Salonen	Unknown	29 December 2018
5	5	"God Is Good" (Jumalan terve)	Hannu Salonen	Unknown	29 December 2018
6	6	"The First Victim" (Ensimmäinen uhri)	Hannu Salonen	Unknown	29 December 2018
7	7	"Predator" (Saalistaja)	Hannu Salonen	Unknown	29 December 2018
8	8	"Carrier" (Taudinkantajat)	Hannu Salonen	Unknown	4 January 2019
9	9	"Murmansk" (Murmansk)	Hannu Salonen	Unknown	4 January 2019
10	10	"Venla" (Venla)	Hannu Salonen	Unknown	4 January 2019

=== Season 2 (2021-22) ===
No. overall	No. in season	Title	Directed by	Written by	Original release date
11	1	"The Latest Police" (Uusin poliisi)	Jussi Hiltunen	Iiro Küttner	19 December 2021
12	2	"In the Middle of Nowhere" (Keskellä ei mitään)	Jussi Hiltunen	Iiro Küttner	19 December 2021
13	3	"Catch" (Saalis)	Jussi Hiltunen	Reeta Ruotsalainen	26 December 2021
14	4	"Justice" (Oikeus ja kohtuus)	Jussi Hiltunen	Reeta Ruotsalainen	2 January 2022
15	5	"Guilty" (Syyllinen)	Jussi Hiltunen	Aleksi Delikouras	9 January 2022
16	6	"Parents" (Vanhemmat)	Jussi Hiltunen	Aleksi Delikouras	16 January 2022

=== Season 3 (2023) ===
No. overall	No. in season	Title	Directed by	Written by	Original release date
17	1	"Return" (Paluu)	Juha Lankinen	Iiro Küttner	4 October 2023
18	2	"Lost and Found" (Löytötavara)	Juha Lankinen	Iiro Küttner	11 October 2023
19	3	"Hide and Seek" (Piilossa)	Juha Lankinen	Iiro Küttner	18 October 2023
20	4	"Mess" (Sotku)	Juha Lankinen	Iiro Küttner	25 October 2023
21	5	"Breaking and Entering" (Murto ja varkaus)	Juha Lankinen	Iiro Küttner	1 November 2023
22	6	"Event" (Julkistus)	Juha Lankinen	Iiro Küttner	8 November 2023

=== Season 4 (2025) ===
No. overall	No. in season	Title	Directed by	Written by	Original release date
23	1	"Faraway Stranger" (Kaukainen vieras)	Juha Lankinen	Iiro Küttner, Ollie Haikka, Petja Peltoma	1 January 2025
Nina continues as Ivalo's police chief. NBI agent Stenius is in Ivalo to ensure the security of an international space conference. A major accident at a senior home turns out to be mass murder..
24	2	"Divine Sign" (Valittujen merkki)	Juha Lankinen	Iiro Küttner, Ollie Haikka, Petja Peltoma	1 January 2025
The investigation into the mass murder is kept secret but Aikio smells a rat. A suspected terrorist arrives in Ivalo. It seems the threat of terrorism, the mass murder and the approaching comet are all connected.
25	3	"Burden of the Past" (Menneisyyden arvet)	Juha Lankinen	Iiro Küttner, Ollie Haikka, Petja Peltoma	1 January 2025
Old events related to a religious sect are unraveling. Nina tries to interrogate Esko's father Ossi about the past. Police officer Aikio is shot. The police find out who is behind the mass murder.
26	4	"The Last of His Family" (Sukunsa viimeinen)	Juha Lankinen	Iiro Küttner, Ollie Haikka, Petja Peltoma	1 January 2025
Nina recognizes the terrorist FBI is looking for. The motive of the mass murder is confirmed. The life of Jonathan Sprout, an astrophysicist visiting Ivalo, is in danger.
27	5	"Divine Guidance" (Johdatus)	Juha Lankinen	Iiro Küttner, Ollie Haikka, Petja Peltoma	1 January 2025
The 40-year-old events and who is the last member of the Taimen family unravels to Nina. Nina's son Santeri is kidnapped. Desperate Nina decides to trust the divine guidance.

== Production ==
In November 2017, it was announced that the main cast would consist of Iina Kuustonen, Maximilian Brückner, Clemens Schick and Pihla Viitala. It was also announced that filming of season one would begin in Finland later that month, on the 27th of November 2017. Filming of season 2 took place in Finnish Lapland during the autumn of 2020 and later winter/early spring of 2021.

== Release ==
The series aired on ZDF in Germany in 2020. In North America the rights to the series were acquired by Topic. As part of its ongoing distribution deal Lagardère Studios Distribution also sold the rights to Polar+ (France), RTS (Switzerland), BeTV (Belgium), Videotron (Canada), NPO (The Netherlands), IVI (Russia), Canal Plus (Poland), RTP (Portugal), Cosmopolitan TV (Spain), Elisa (China) and FTV Outre-mer 1e (France overseas). In the UK, the series was acquired by Walter Presents in 2022 and airs on Channel 4's on-demand service.
