= Asioita, joista vaietaan =

Asioita joista vaietaan

Studio album by Jaakko Löytty
- Released: 1974 (NKLP-2)
- Recorded: Seppo Lindell’s studio, Tampere, 1974
- Genre: gospel
- Label: Kirkon nuorisotyön keskus (LP, 1974); Tampere diocese (CD, 2003)
- Producer: Seppo Lindell

Jaakko Löytty chronology
Asioita joista vaietaan (1974)	Jeesuksen ystäviä (1975)

Asioita joista vaietaan (‘Things that people keep quiet about’) is the debut LP by the Finnish gospel artist Jaakko Löytty, released in 1974 by Kirkon nuorisotyön keskus (‘Church centre for youth work’) as NKLP-2. It was one of the first gospel album released in Finland, preceded perhaps only by the LP Ihminen by the Helsinki group Dominicones (1973, NKLP-1) and the album Hän muutti kaiken by the group Pro Fide, likewise released in 1973.

== Original vinyl release ==
- Words and music by Jaakko Löytty, except where otherwise stated.

Side one

No.	Title	Words	Length
1.	"Ilouutinen (‘Good tidings’)"
2.	"Asioita joista vaietaan (‘Things that people keep quiet about’)"
3.	"Niin vain on (Ylöjärvi-hymni) (‘This is simply so (a hymn for Ylöjärvi)’)"
4.	"Jeppe"
5.	"Nyt syksy on (‘It’s autumn now’)"
6.	"Matkamies (‘Wayfarer’)"	Words: Jaakko Löytty, Kaija Pispa

Side two

No.	Title	Length
7.	"Vain yksi tie (‘Only one way’)"	3.41
8.	"Tahdon kiittää Herraa (‘I want to thank the Lord’)"
9.	"19.3. –74 (Mun Vapahtajain) (’19 March 1974 (My Saviour)’)"
10.	"Pieni iltalaulu (‘A small evensong’)"
11.	"Olen... (villi uni) (‘I am … (a wild dream)’)"
12.	"Asioita joista vaietaan II (‘Things that people keep quiet about II’)"
13.	"Kala-Pekka (‘Fisherman Peter’)"

== Musicians ==
- Jaakko Löytty — vocals, acoustic guitar, harmonica, piano, organ
- Jouko Laivuori — piano, organ
- Tarvo Laakso — guitars, percussion
- Seppo Lindell — bass, guitars
- Sakari Löytty — drums, percussion, banjo
