= Sääminki =

Sääminki Säminge
- Former municipality
- Säämingin kunta Säminge kommun
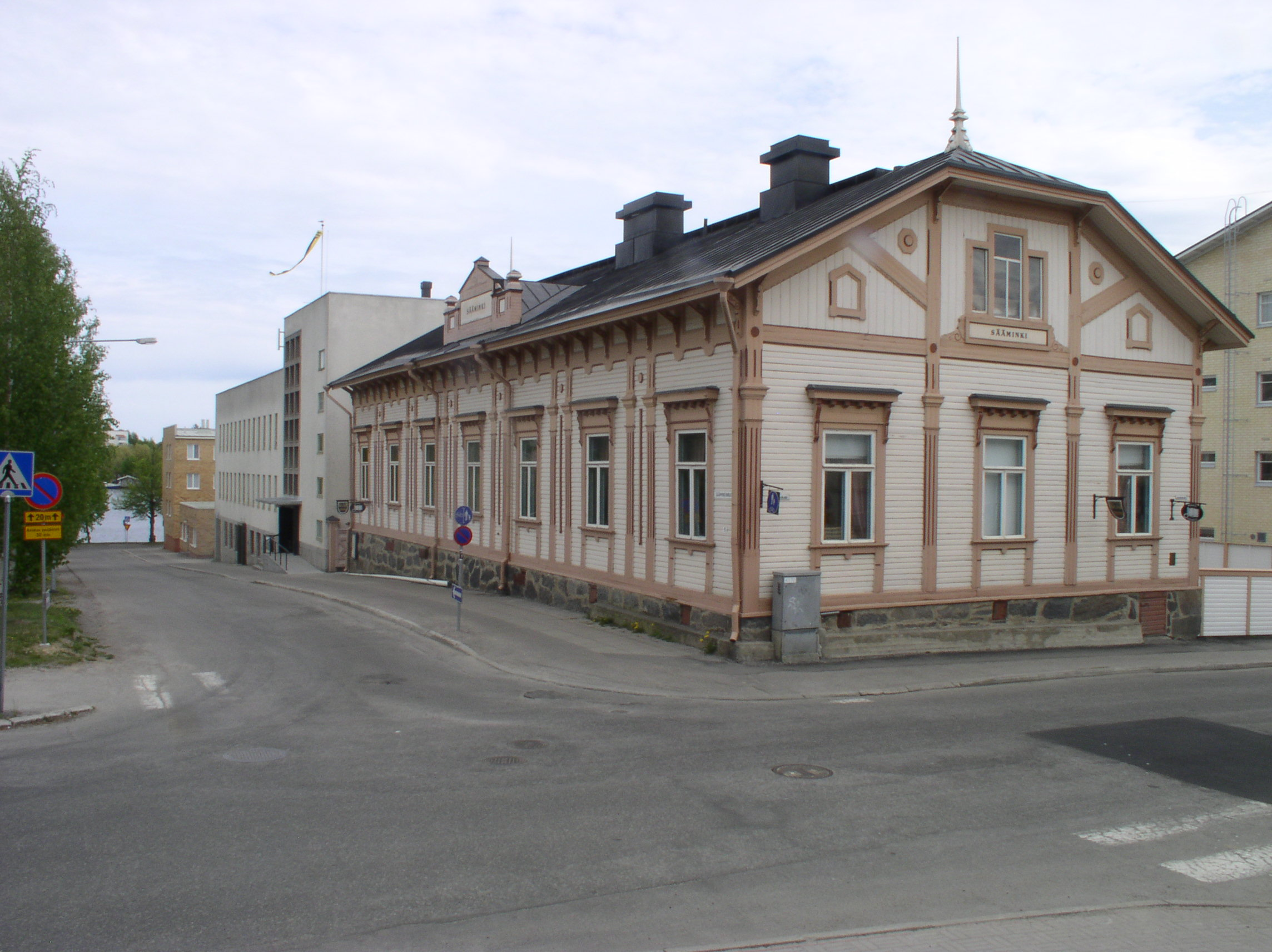
- The old municipal hall of Sääminki

- Coat of arms

- Location of Sääminki in Finland
- Coordinates: 61°52′03″N 28°52′43″E
- Country: Finland
- Region: South Savo
- Charter: 1867
- Parish: 1504
- Consolidated: 1973

Area
  - Total: 10,099 km^{2} (3,899 sq mi)

Population (1970)
  - Total: 11,710
  - Density: 1.160/km^{2} (3.003/sq mi)
- Time zone: UTC+2 (EET)
  - Summer (DST): UTC+3 (EEST)

Sääminki (Finnish: [ˈsæːmiŋki]; Swedish: Säminge) was a countryside and former municipality of Finland. Most of Sääminki municipality was incorporated in 1973 with the Savonlinna town and the rest with Punkaharju municipality.

It was in the province of Eastern Finland and was part of the South Savo region. The municipality had a population of 11,710 and covered an area of 1009,9 km^{2} (31 December 1970). The population density was 11.60 inhabitants per km^{2}.

== Notable people ==
- Marja-Liisa Vartio (1924-1966), writer, born in Sääminki
- Heikki Silvennoinen (1954-2024), actor and musician, born in Sääminki
