= Laika & the Cosmonauts =

Finnish rock band

- Origin: Finland
- Genres: Surf rock; instrumental rock; rautalanka
- Years active: 1987–2008
- Labels: Yep Roc Records (US); Grandpop Records (Finland)
- Past members: Mikko Lankinen; Janne Haavisto; Matti Pitsinki; Tom Nyman

Laika & the Cosmonauts were a Finnish rock band. They had the same lineup from the time they formed in 1987 until they stopped recording in 2008. The band was named after Laika, a Soviet space dog that died on board Sputnik 2 in 1957. Their sound was usually described as surf rock, but a Boston Globe review noted that the band's sound is "far beyond the limitations of any specific genre." The band relied heavily on the Finnish rautalanka electric guitar tradition. They toured the United States and Europe several times. Al Jourgensen of Ministry called them "the best f**king band in the world". In an email to the band's mailing list on 23 April 2008, Laika & the Cosmonauts announced they would be drawing their twenty-year career to a close with an American tour through the summer of 2008. The tour ended with shows at the Continental Club in Austin, Texas that fall. A compilation album, Cosmopolis, was released at the start of the tour.

== Band members ==
- Mikko Lankinen – guitar
- Matti Pitsinki – organ, guitar
- Tom Nyman – bass
- Janne Haavisto – drums

== Discography ==
- C'mon Do the Laika (1988)
- Surfs You Right (1990)
- Instruments of Terror (1992)
- The Amazing Colossal Band (1995)
- Zero Gravity (US compilation, 1996)
- Absurdistan (1997)
- Laika Sex Machine (live, 2000)
- Local Warming (2004)
- Cosmopolis (compilation, 2008)
