= Rekilaulu =

Finnish song form

Rekilaulu is a type of rhymed stanzaic folk song in Finland.

This musical form was influenced by German, Swedish, and British traditions of ballads and broadsides. The term rekilaulu may be a Finnish adaptation of the German terms Reigenlied or Reihenlied.
