= Mikko Lankinen =

Finnish musician

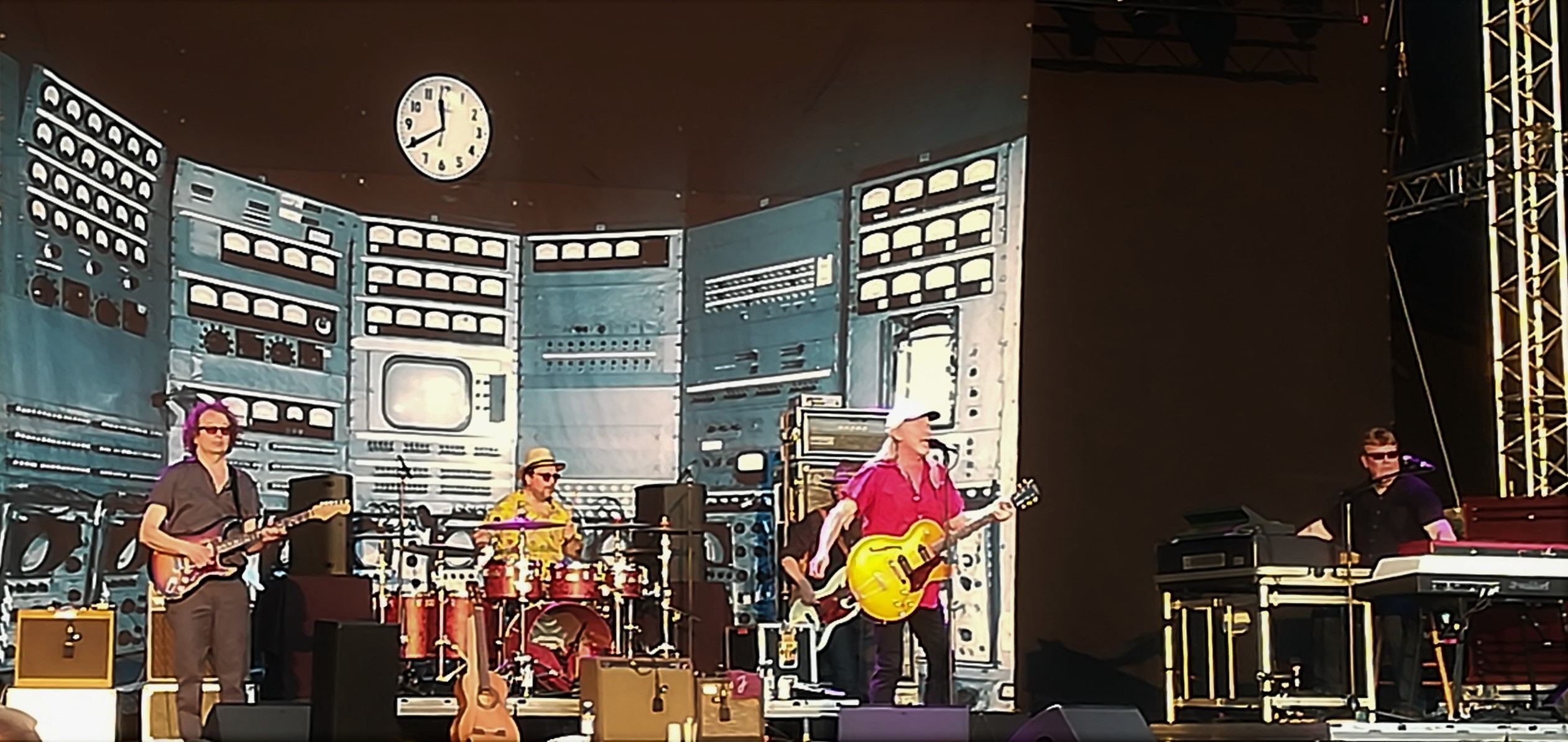
J Karjalainen's gig in the summer of 2019. Mikko Lankinen in the picture on the left.

Mikko Lankinen is a Finnish musician. He plays lead guitar for the Finnish surf rock group Laika & the Cosmonauts and instrumental rock group The Potatoes. The lead singer for the Finnish progressive metal group Scenery Channel is also called Mikko Lankinen but they are not the same person.
