= Kummeli =

Finnish comedy troupe from Tampere, Finland

Kummeli is the name of a Finnish comedy troupe formed by the late Heikki Silvennoinen, Timo Kahilainen and Heikki Hela from Tampere. They are also the heads of Porkkana Ryhmä, the troupe's production company. Other famous members have included Olli Keskinen, better known for his on-screen persona Eero Kakko, and Heikki Vihinen, who replaced Keskinen in the mid-90s.

Kummeli appeared on television between 1991 and 1995. After a successful three-part pilot aired in 1991, they were given their own show on YLE 2. The Kummeli TV show was primarily composed of sketches with eccentric characters, but it would also feature musical guests; the core members of the team were originally musicians rather than professional actors (with the exception of Hela). Some episodes would also have a running sketch that would reach its conclusion at the end of the episode (such as a father and son visiting an exhibit where the wax figures are actually the museum staff, posing in various costumes).

In the mid-90s, after the end of the show, the Kummeli troupe would make random appearances on TV and at different events. During this time Keskinen left the troupe and was replaced by Heikki Vihinen.

Kummeli was re-launched at the turn of the millennium, with Keskinen returning to host the show, now with a live studio audience. Another re-launch occurred in 2004, with Mikko Kivinen hosting the show for a short run. In between these two seasons of Kummeli, Keskinen and Silvennoinen, along with some other colleagues, produced another short-lived sketch comedy show, Mankeli.

== The name ==
Kummeli comes from a Finnish word for a sea marker (basically, a pile of stones, a cairn) which indicates territorial waters. This is sometimes used as a symbol of fans for the group as a signpost of comedy and telling people to do their own thing. Though the Kummeli crew do not deny the potential symbolism the reason for picking the name (which was suggested by Keskinen's wife), it was probably chosen just because it sounds humorous to Finns.

The group is often incorrectly referred to as Kummelit which is the plural of "Kummeli" and is not the name of the crew itself. The official name of the team is Porkkana Ryhmä, which translates as "Carrot Crew". In the earlier seasons of the show the actual group was referred to as "Kummeli pojat" ("(the) Kummeli boys"), though the carrot group text and logo was also shown at the beginning of an episode.

== Famous characters ==
- Ari Zwang (Timo Kahilainen) is a typical Finnish bass player. In his first skit, he's playing with his drummer, Janis Petke (Heikki Silvennoinen). The music stops and Ari tells a dark bassist joke. Then the drummer starts to do a fake laugh, and the music continues. Later Ari Zwang played with his studio band at the Kummeli Studio in 1997, with the host Fabio (Heikki Vihinen).
- Eero Kakko = The on-screen persona of Olli Keskinen who hosted the show after the first three pilots (which were hosted by a character called Ilpo Nuokko, played by Silvennoinen) and also reported on "live" happenings such as public marathons and also for the "program within a program" Ympäristöruutu (=Ecology TV).
- Matti Näsä = a grotesque caricature of a typical working-class Finnish man with boyish charm but with black marks under his eyes and a mild speech impediment (in addition to a heavy Tampere accent). He was portrayed by Silvennoinen. In his skits "Matti Näsällä on asiaa" (Matti Näsä has something to say, also a pun on a Finnish show "Karpolla on asiaa") he would often go into rants about the high cost of living, the ambiguity of tax forms, public vandalism and commercialism. Later episodes introduced his brother Teppo, portrayed by Hela. He has a tattoo of a crudely drawn penis on his right arm.
- Jaakko Parantainen = (portrayed by Silvennoinen) The only regular guest on "Ympäristöruutu" who started as a mild-mannered person hired by the government to fix things (which he admitted to not always understanding). He would blabber about off-point or barely related subjects and make statements such as "boats should be ridden because boats like to be ridden" and "that's what Tarzan did, too". Later he grew a bit of a backbone and started coming up with jokes, metaphors, singing and talking back to his constant interviewer Kakko. On one rare occasion he also burst out in a superhero outfit, claiming that being a superhero is his actual job, and also interviewed Kakko. Stated by the makers to be based on a true story of a man who got paid for filling YLE's oil heating system's oil tank long after they moved to a different form of a heating system.
- Raimo Vormisto & Timo Silakka = trainer and athlete respectively, performed by Silvennoinen and Kahilainen, who became the stars of "SporttiVartti" after the three pilots. Silvennoinen is Vormisto, an overweight sports instructor with a speech impediment (he croaks his Rs from his throat, and has an unusual rhythm of speech), unorthodox (but occasionally successful) training methods and an over-emphasis on the importance of one's behind (instructing Silakka to "puristaa perseellä", "squeeze with the buttocks" in each episode, regardless of would it really help in the actual sport). Silakka is the athlete who makes up for his lack of stature with his enthusiasm. Silakka has admitted that his least favourite form of sport is the squat.
- Iso-Pebe = A music reporter, played by Keskinen, who dressed in black, always wore shades and spoke with raspy voice and in an incomprehensible form of slang in an attempt to be cool.
- Father and Son (Isä Ja Poika) = In 1999, Kummeli had a skit that had a prepubescent boy called Jyrki (Heikki Silvennoinen) and the father (Timo Kahilainen). At the beginning of the skit the father opens the door of Jyrki's room and asks him to . Jyrki says nothing. The father then asks him to do some chores, like buying some butter from the store. The Jyrki just answers: "I can't." The father asks him again and again, then he finally says "Jyrki please". Jyrki starts to scream loudly, the father closes the door and does the chores by himself, feeling bad about his son.
- The "Best Class A" (Paras A-Ryhmä) = The show would often be opened by two characters exhibiting the difference between a "loser" and a "Class A citizen", then declaring the Class A citizen superior. The differences between the loser and the Class A citizen were often based on twisting of proper etiquette (such as not wasting water when washing, resulting in only washing the hands), machismo (driving a Mercedes-Benz instead of a "Japanese piece of junk"), or just on plain absurdity (crossing a street while relying solely on luck, as opposed to "style, skill, pain or common sense"). The name of the skit was semi-incorrectly by the makers in an English pilot as "best A-group"
- The Professor & the Midgets (Älykääpiöt) = A bizarre and intentionally phallic skit where the professor (Hela) would discover two bald dwarves (Silvennoinen and Kahilainen) making a racket (älämölö). In the end the three settle their differences and the midgets offer the professor some "nuts". Later the skits would include the professor reminding the dwarves that "in this sort of a case, it should always be remembered that Tero goes in first" (look below). The main joke of the skit is the professor asking the names of the dwarves which like the bald, stern dwarves themselves are intentionally phallic:
  - Tero Nuppi, referring to terska (the Finnish equivalent of the British slang "knob").
  - Esa Nahka, referring to esinahka, the Finnish word for foreskin.

The literal translation of "älykääpiöt" would be "brain-midgets", which is a term used by and while talking with children, meaning a person who behaves in a way that makes them stupider than they are

- Mauno Ahonen = a hapless reporter played by Silvennoinen who was supposed to make speedy news reports but actually slowed the show down. He also reported for the "live" TV quiz "Missä mennään? Jouko ja Kosti". He has terribly unclean teeth, not having seen a dentist in several decades. His reporting career never gets anywhere because he is constantly assigned to report on droll topics, usually made of well-known jokes, wordplays or, on one occasion, on Ahonen's own dental hygiene. His favourite bar is the Ohranjyvä pub.
- Pertti "Speedy" Keinonen & Sakari "Saku" Östermalm = Two aging metalheads (Silvennoinen & Kahilainen) whose long hair, rock'n'roll lifestyle and plain bad luck often result in injuries. They have an "artist pays all the expenses" record contract with an unknown record company, and their favourite songs include their own "Hänmies" (He-Man, also a joke about the Finnish language not having separate words for "he" and "she", both being just "hän"), "Tuomiopäivä" (Doomsday) and Led Zeppelin's "Whole Lotta Love". both of them, but especially Saku have a habit of always chewing gum and getting it stuck on their own and each other's hair. They are also quite unintelligent and unaware of common things, such as the names of artists, whether one hundred or one thousand is more, is a few hundred metres worth taking a taxi and the meaning of the word "artist" (resulting in them thinking the "artist in all" contract means that everything they do is paid for, instead of them paying all themselves)

Some characters were also created just to deliver two or more words as short skits. Most infamous being the famous "Kyllä lähtee!" shout which became the show's trademark opening. The word kyllä usually meaning yes, but very much in this context and lähtee being the third or improper form of the word lähteä meaning to leave. The meaning of the phrase is to describe something to be fast or powerful, translating to "it will surely take off in a hasty manner". In the context of the program, the translation could be "it's on!".

Later this was replaced by another pair of men called Kippe and Mosse (probably meant to be nicknames) one asking the other "Kippe/Mosse is everything OK" and the other replying "OK" followed by them saying "OK" all over again until they usually move out of the picture in a car, on a bicycle or with another vehicle.

== Films ==
After the mid-90s the Kummeli crew began to make films. Their first, Kummeli: Stories begins as a story of a fictional military conflict between Finland and Luxembourg but concentrated on the stories of the soldiers which were built into long skits. The skits also had recurring characters and one of them reveals the character of Kahilainen to be the grown up version of a character he portrayed in the TV show. The movie also contains a movie in itself; a short flick called Lakaisijat (The Sweepers) about newlyweds staying at a hotel run by a murderous psychopath who has trapped his simple-minded twin brother in the attic. The titular Sweepers are a two-man cleaning company (Silvennoinen and Kahilainen) modelled after the stereotypical Frankenstein's monster and Igor characters.

Their second film was the 1997 Kummeli: Kultakuume (Gold Rush) which told the story of a motley crew of characters travelling to Lapland to collect a gold treasure hidden by the main protagonist's father during the war. The movie also featured popular comedy actors such Aake Kalliala of Pulttibois fame and Vesa-Matti Loiri of Uuno Turhapuro fame.

A third movie Kummelin Jackpot, was released in February 2006. It was about a divorced man portrayed by Silvennoinen, who realises a way to trick himself a jackpot in football betting. In 2008, Kummeli: Alivuokralainen, was released. The script was based on a play by the same name and starred Mikko Kivinen, Heikki Silvennoinen and Timo Kahilainen in the starring roles, along with numerous other Finnish comedy actors.

== See also ==
- Pulttibois
- Putous
- Studio Julmahuvi
- Vintiöt
