= Susanna Haavisto =

Finnish actress and singer (born 1957)

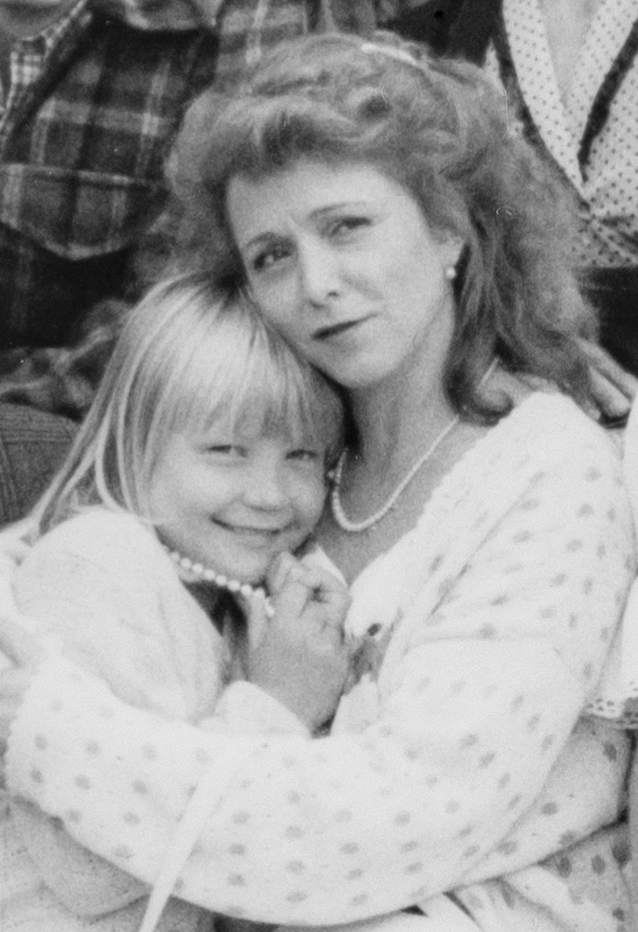
- Born: 20 October 1957 (age 68); Helsinki, Finland
- Spouse: Juha Tikka (1983-present)
- Children: 2

Susanna Haavisto (born 20 October 1957, in Helsinki) is a Finnish actress and singer. She is the daughter of musician Jukka Haavisto and sister of musicians Olli and Janne Haavisto.

She has taken part in several movies and TV programs. She was UNICEF National Ambassador in 1980.

== Filmography ==
- Arctic Circle (TV series, 2018)
- Kymmenen riivinrautaa (2002)
- Ripa ruostuu (1993)
- Mestari (1992)
- Vääpeli Körmy ja marsalkan sauva (1990)
- Ariel (1988)
- Kuningas lähtee Ranskaan (1986)
- Aidankaatajat eli heidän jälkeensä vedenpaisumus (1982)
- Läpimurto (1981)
- Prologi (1980)
