= Heikki Hela =

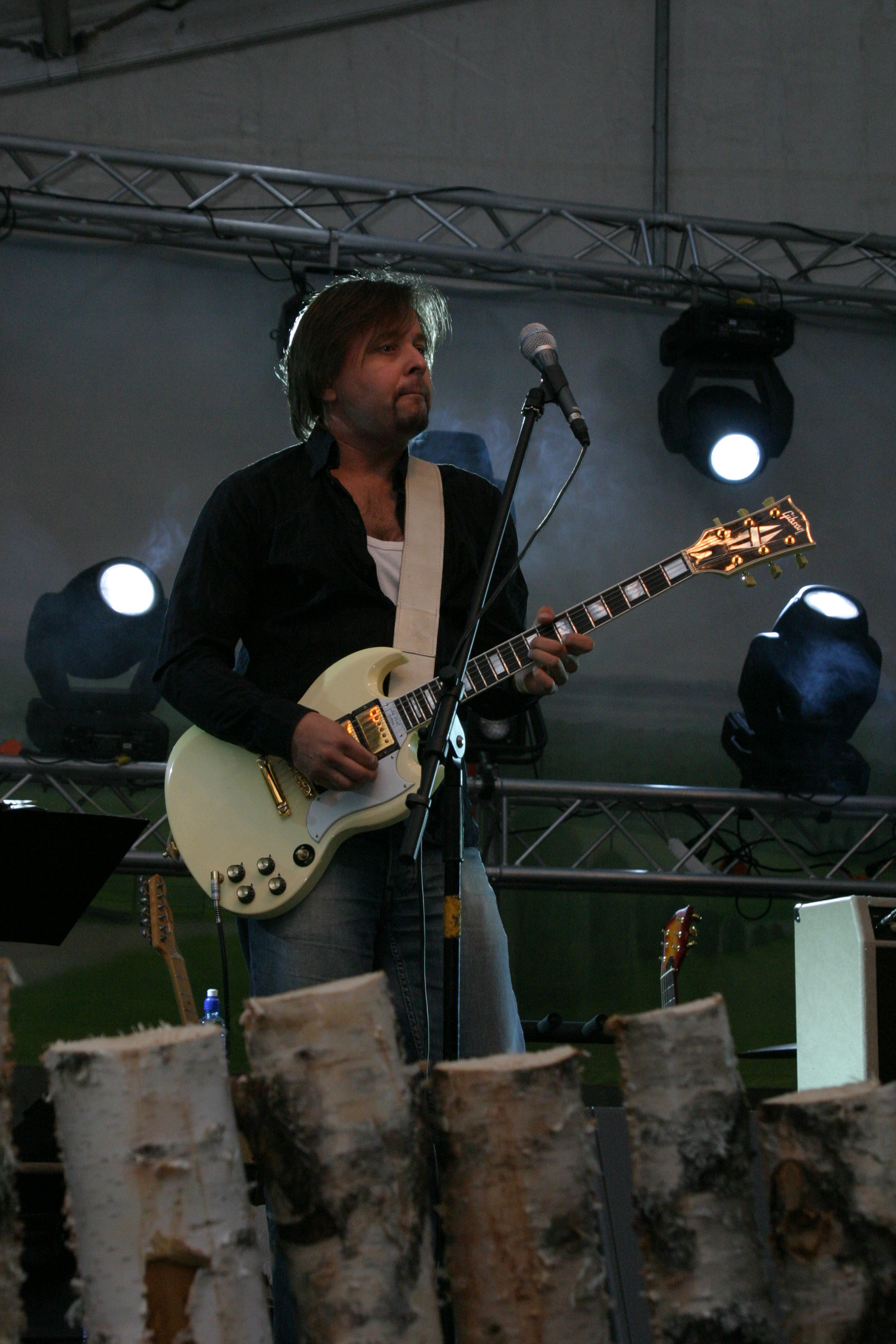
- Heikki Hela in Vihreät Niityt music festival
- Born: 1964 (age 61–62); Aitolahti, Finland

Heikki Hela (born 19 July 1964 in Aitolahti) is a Finnish entertainer, actor and musician, best remembered for his role in the early 1990s hit show Kummeli and his hit song "Uneton Yö", featured on his debut album, Kaikista Kaikkein. Since then, he has recorded three more albums (Kaksi Maailmaa, Lauantain Toivotut Levyt and se tulee läpi), along with playing numerous roles in Kummeli spinoff films and other titles such as the comedy film Kahlekuningas (Handcuff King).

He has had two singles, "Uneton Yo" was number four in 1994 and "Naisen Hymy was number seven in 1999, and one album, Heikki Hela was number three in 1994, in the Finnish top ten.

He has been married to Mari Posti since 1996 and they have two children.

== Filmography ==
- Kummeli (1991–2004)
- Kummeli Stories (1995)
- Lihaksia ja Luoteja (1996)
- Kummeli: Kultakuume (1997)
- Johtaja Uuno Turhapuro - pisnismies (1998)
- Lääkärit Tulessa (1998)
- The Tough Ones (1999)
- Ihana Mies (1999)
- Minä, Joki ja Metsä (2000)
- Mankeli (2000)
- Jurismia! (2002)
- Liekki (2002)
- Handcuff King (2002)
- Beatlehem (2003)
- Kummelin Jackpot (2006)
