= Merja Jalo =

Finnish children's writer

Merja Jalo (born November 25, 1951, as Merja Viro) is a Finnish children's and young adult book writer; most of her books tell about the life with horses.

== Works ==
Her first writing was "Yllätysori" in 1977 from the Nummela Pony Stable, her longest and most popular series.

The second series was Haavikko Stables (1978–2001).

The Nea series was published during 1989–2015.

The Markus series started in 1992.

She also wrote a series about Jesse the dog together with her sister Marvi.

Jalo wrote of her own experience with horses since her childhood. She was also in racehorse breeding in her own stable (until a horse accident).

== Awards ==
- 2008: Kirjava kettu ("Spotted fox") reader's award
- Pirkanmaan Plättä award (1978, 1985, 1991, 2011)
