= Iina Kuustonen =

Finnish actress (born 1984)

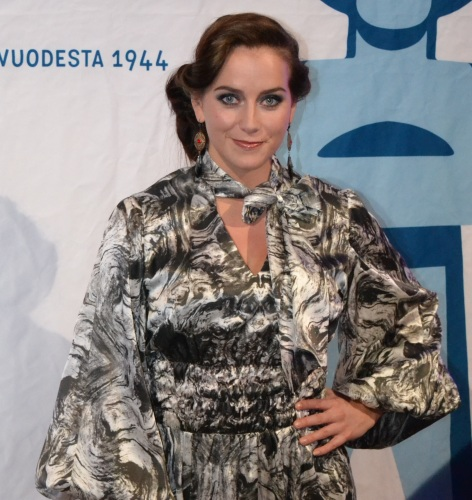
- Kuustonen in 2011
- Born: 18 April 1984 (age 42); Helsinki, Finland
- Occupation: Actor
- Years active: 2005–present
- Children: 2
- Awards: Kultainen Venla for best actress

Iina Kuustonen (born 18 April 1984) is a Finnish actress.

Kuustonen is best known for her appearances in the Finnish television series Putous (2011–2014), Helsingin herra (2012) and Syke (2014). She has also played in several movies, including The Kiss of Evil (2011) and FC Venus (2005). She won the Kultainen Venla, "Golden Venla" award for best actress for her roles in Helsingin Herra and Putous in 2012.

== Early life and education ==
Finnish musician Mikko Kuustonen is Iina Kuustonen's father. Iina's sister Minka Kuustonen is also an actress. Kuustonen was born in Helsinki, where she studied at the Helsinki theatre academy, and graduated with a master's degree in acting in 2011.

Iina Kuustonen in 2026

== Career ==
Kuustonen has done a lot of work in theatres, and for example performed as the second lead Pirkko Mannola in the musical Pirkko & Åke at the summer theatre of Valkeakoski in summer 2010. She has also performed in Ronia, the Robber's Daughter at Suomenlinna summer theatre in 2011, and in Espoo city theater's musical Kojoottikuu in 2014.

She has also done a lot of Finnish dubs to movies, including Kung Fu Panda (2008), How to Train Your Dragon (2010) and The Croods (2013).

== Personal life ==
Kuustonen was engaged to Sebastian Rejman but in June 2022 the couple announced that they have separated. Together they have a son born in September 2016 and a daughter born in February 2019.

== Filmography ==
=== Film ===
Year	Title	Role
2005	FC Venus	a woman in the bar
2007	Uh-huh	Hanna
2008	8 päivää ensi-iltaan	Noora
2011	The Kiss of Evil	Tuikku Sylvin
2013	Miesten välisiä keskusteluja	Noora
2013	Rölli and the Golden Key	Sähinä
2013	Kekkonen tulee!	Sinikka
2013	Parittomat	Kisu
2013	Nuoren Wertherin Jäljillä	Kati
2013	Ella ja Kaverit - Paterock	Teacher's wife
2014	Kummeli V	Tupsu
2014	Kesäkaverit	Karoliina
2015	Naisen nimi	Annu
2015	Viikossa aikuiseksi	Kaisa-Leena
2016	Äkkilähtö	Ansku
2016	Rölli and the Secret of All Time	Sähinä
2021	Nurses – Dreadful Hospital Outage	Iiris Ketola
2022	Häät ennen hautajaisia	Joanna
2022	Witness the Fitness	Kerttu
2022	Herman the Circus Clown	Viola
2026	Over your dead body	Hollywood Allegra

=== Television ===
Year	Title	Role
2007	Sanaton sopimus	Krista Järvi
2007	Kultainen noutaja	Riina
2007	Käenpesä	woman in the art video
2008	Suojelijat	Sarita Anttila
2009	Ihmebantu	Multiple roles
2010	Helppo elämä	Rossu
2011	Virta	Hanna Miettinen
2011	Hip Hop Hamlet	Niina Saraste
2011–2013	Putous	Multiple roles
2012	Helsingin herra	Maisa Sinivuo
2014–2019, 2022–	Syke	Iiris Ketola
2012–2017	Kimmo	Irina
2015	Kingi	Tove Hansson, other characters
2015–2017	Downshiftaajat	Satu
2018	Arctic Circle	Nina Kautsalo
2023	66th North Precinct	Essi Kangas
2026	Hildur	Leena Pesonen

=== Voice acting ===
Year	Title	Role
2008	Kung Fu Panda	Master Viper
2010	How to Train Your Dragon	Astrid Hofferson
2011	Kung Fu Panda 2	Master Viper
2011	Arthur Christmas	Many roles
2011	Happy Feet Two	Carmen
2012	Secret of the Wings	Gliss
2012	Pajunkissametsä	Multiple roles
2013	Wreck-It Ralph	Vanellope von Schweetz
2013	The Croods	Eep Crood
2013	Boule et Bill	Caroline
2014	How to Train Your Dragon 2	Astrid Hofferson
2014	The Lego Movie	Lucy/Wyldstyle
2014	Leonard Nappula	Multiple roles
2016	Zootopia	Officer Judy Hopps
2016	Kung Fu Panda 3	Master Viper
2018	Ralph Breaks the Internet	Vanellope von Schweetz
2019	The Lego Movie 2	Lucy
