= Eero Raittinen =

Finnish vocalist and drummer (1944–2025)

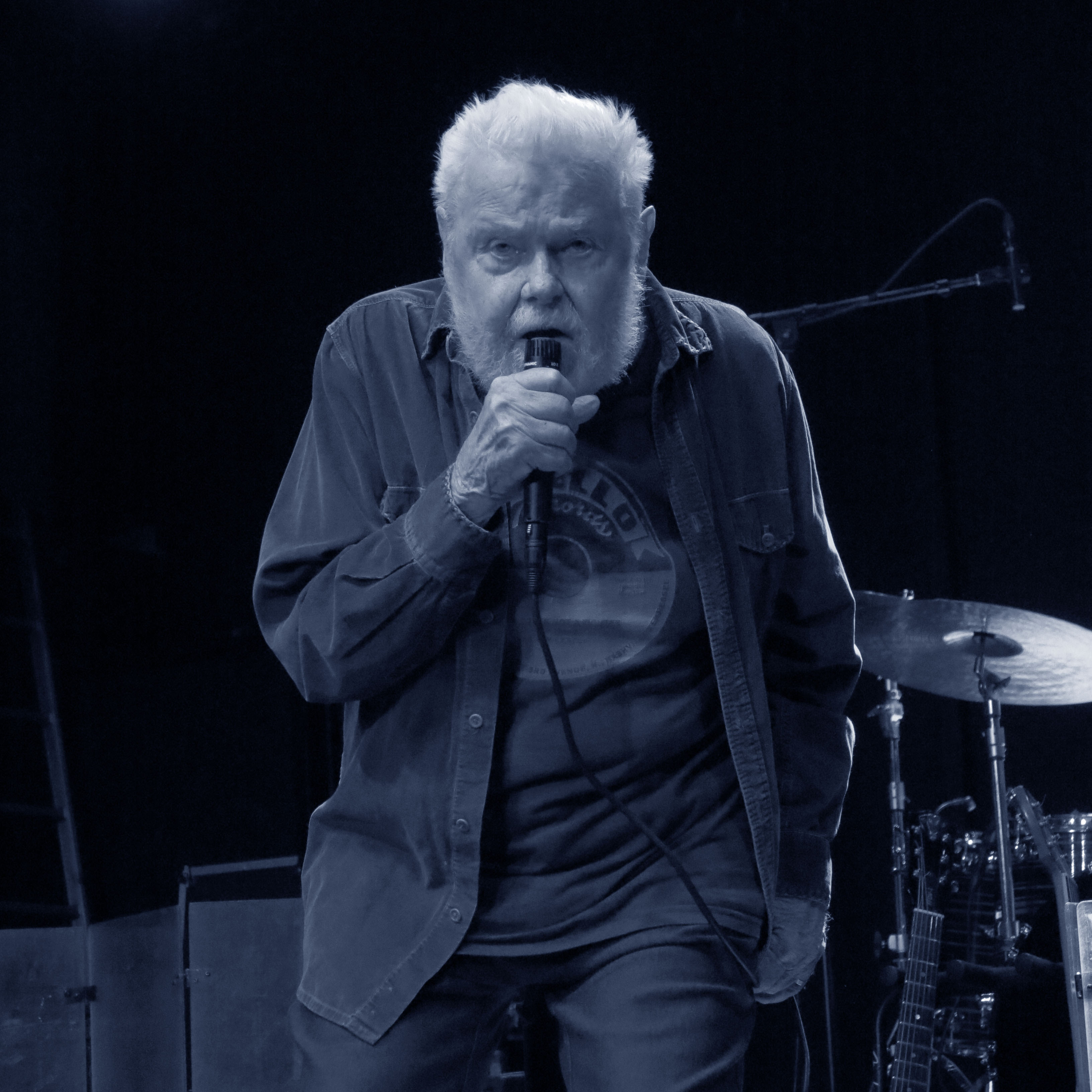
- Raittinen performing in 2023

Background information
- Born: Eero Nikodemus Raittinen; 6 October 1944; Helsinki, Finland
- Died: 16 July 2025 (aged 80) Lohja, Finland
- Occupations: Singer; drummer
- Years active: 1960–2025
- Formerly of: The Esquires; The Sounds; The Boys; Tasavallan Presidentti

Eero Nikodemus Raittinen (6 October 1944 – 16 July 2025) was a Finnish pop, rock and blues singer and drummer.

== Life and career ==
Raittinen was born on 6 October 1944. Starting in 1960, he performed in various bands, initially alongside his older brother Jussi Raittinen, but mostly had a solo career spanning over sixty years. Among his better-known recordings are the Finnish cover versions of the Swedish Mälarö kyrka (1968) and the Italian Che sarà (1971). Between 1972-74 he was lead vocalist for Tasavallan Presidentti, replacing Frank Robson. Raittinen is credited as a primary artist on 17 albums, including several for major labels such as RCA and Epic. He took part in the Finnish qualification for the 1974 Eurovision Song Contest, but failed to get through to the final.

Raittinen suffered a stroke in 2019. His authorised biography Mies matkallaan: Eero Raittinen was published in 2020. On 8 March 2025, Raittinen underwent a partial leg amputation. On 16 July 2025, it was announced that he had died at the age of 80.
