= J. Karjalainen =

Finnish singer-songwriter (born 1957)

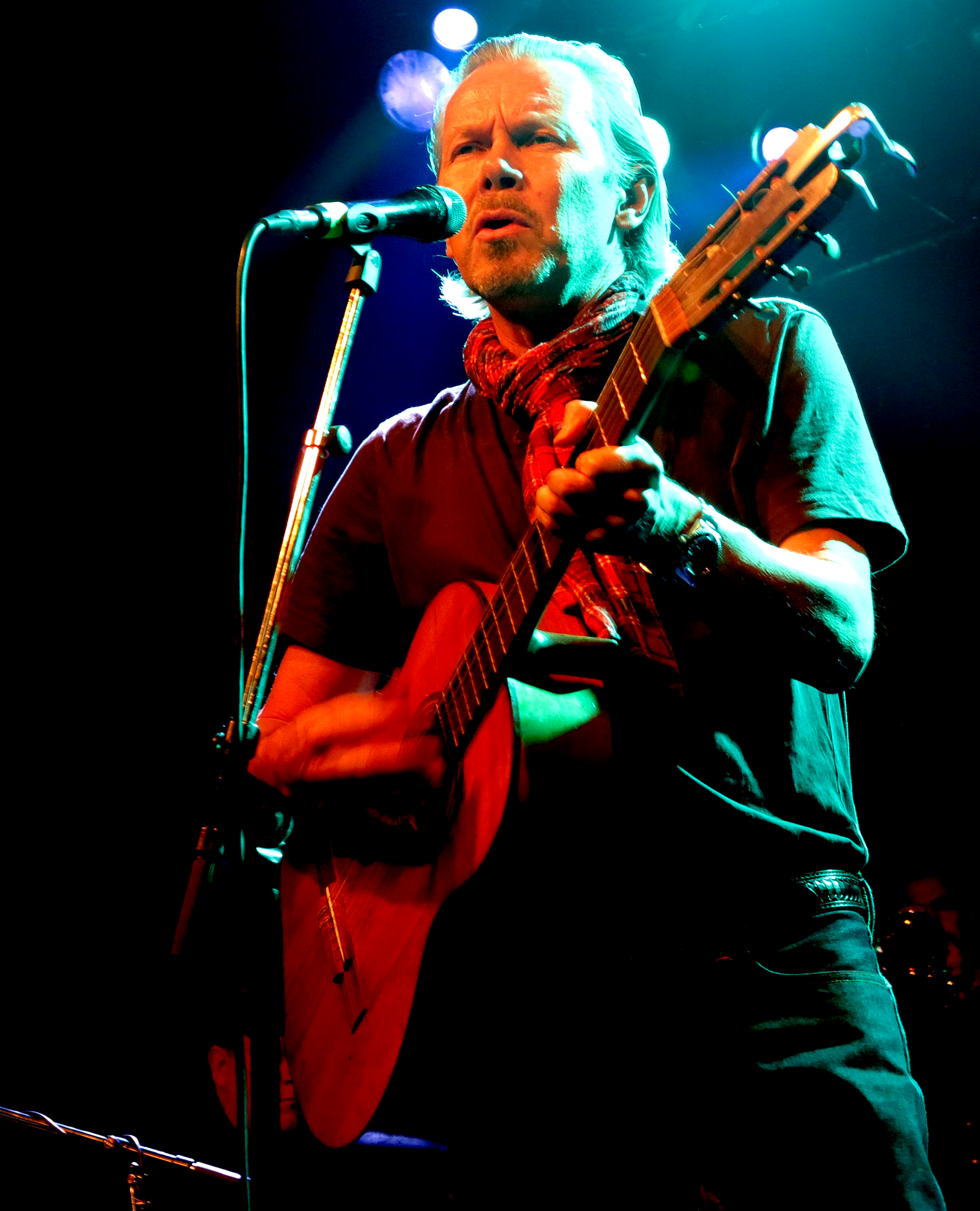
- J. Karjalainen performing in 2014 in Olli and Janne Haavisto’s Fifty-Sixty concert at the Tavastia Club

Background information
- Born: Jukka Tapio Karjalainen; 1 April 1957 (age 69); Helsinki, Finland
- Origin: Helsinki, Finland
- Occupations: Singer, songwriter
- Years active: 1981–present
- Labels: Warner Music Finland; Kompass Records; Poko Records

Jukka Tapio "J." Karjalainen (born 1 April 1957) is a Finnish singer-songwriter. His first album came out in 1981 and he has been called the "Bruce Springsteen of Finland." He states that his music is a mix of "Blues, Rock´n´roll, Folk, Country, Soul, Funky, New Orleans stuff." He also listened to old-time musicians like Tommy Jarrell and Clarence Ashley while learning the 5-string banjo. Karjalainen is married to Kati Bergman, and they have a son, Väinö Karjalainen, who is also a musician and music producer.

== Discography ==
=== Studio albums ===
as J. Karjalainen ja Mustat Lasit

- 1981: J. Karjalainen ja Mustat Lasit (J. Karjalainen and The Dark Glasses)
- 1982: Yö kun saapuu Helsinkiin (When The Night Comes to Helsinki)
- 1983: Tatsum tisal ( Krad Sessalg)
- 1985: Doris
- 1986: Varaani (Monitor Lizard)
- 1987: Kookospähkinäkitara (Coconut guitar)
- 1988: Lumipallo (Snowball)

as J. Karjalainen (1st period)

- 1990: Keltaisessa talossa (In The Yellow House)

J. Karjalainen yhtyeineen (J. Karjalainen and His Band)

- 1991: Päiväkirja (Diary)
- 1992: Tähtilampun alla (Under The Star Lantern)
- 1994: Villejä lupiineja (Wild Lupins)

as J. Karjalainen Electric Sauna

- 1996: J. Karjalainen Electric Sauna
- 1998: Laura Häkkisen silmät (Eyes of Laura Häkkinen)
- 1999: Electric picnic
- 2001: Marjaniemessä (At Marjaniemi)
- 2002: Valtatie (Highway)

as J. Karjalainen (2nd period)

- 2006: Lännen-Jukka (Western-Jukka)
- 2008: Paratiisin pojat (Boys of Paradise)
- 2010: Polkabilly Rebels
- 2013: Et ole yksin (You Are Not Alone)
- 2015: Sinulle, Sofia (For You, Sofia)
- 2018: Sä kuljetat mua (You drive me)
- 2022: Soulavaris
- 2025: Suomalaista Muotoiluu (Finnish design)

=== Live albums ===
as J. Karjalainen ja Mustat Lasit

- 1983: Tunnussävel (Theme Music)
- 1989: Live

=== Singles ===
As J. Karjalainen

- 2013: "Mennyt mies"
- 2013: "Meripihkahuone"
- 2015: "Stindebinde"

== See also ==
- List of best-selling music artists in Finland
