= Janne Haavisto =

Finnish drummer (born 1964)

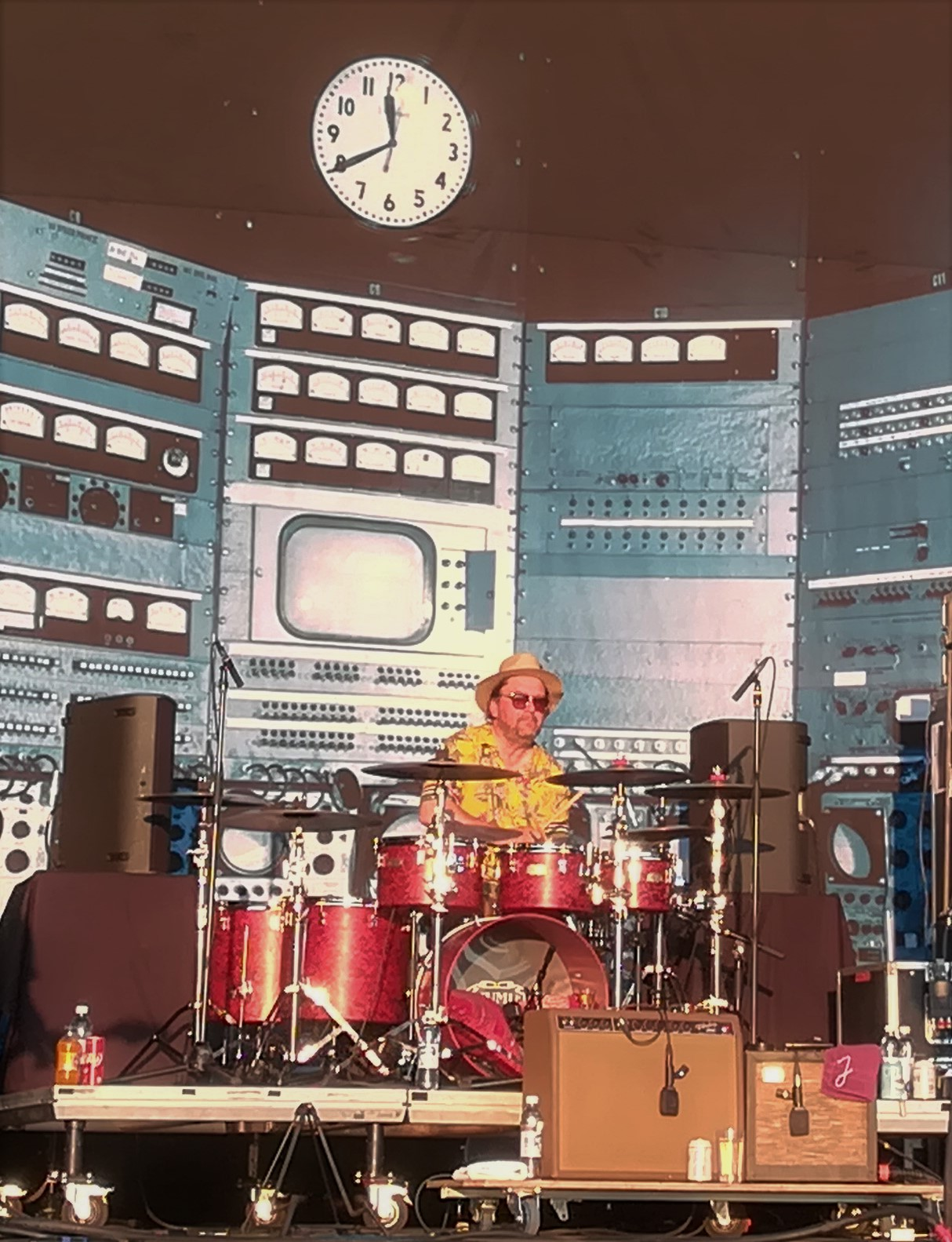

Background information
- Born: 28 November 1964 (age 60); Espoo, Finland
- Origin: Finland
- Genres: Surf rock
- Occupation(s): Drummer, recording engineer and record producer
- Instrument: Drums
- Years active: 1983-

Janne Pekka Haavisto (born 28 November 1964) is a Finnish drummer, recording engineer and record producer. He has been a professional musician since the age of 16.

== Early career ==
Haavisto was born in Espoo. He attended the Sibelius High School in Helsinki and played drums in a band called Bablers together with e.g. Sam Yaffa and Arto Tamminen. The band made a record called Whats all about in 1980.

At the age of 16 Haavisto was given, with the aid of his older brother Olli Haavisto, a job as a drummer for J. Karjalainen & Mustat Lasit (‘J. Karjalainen & The Dark Glasses’). He played with the band for 12 years. In the early stages he went to high school at the same time and also passed the matriculation exams. They played as many as 300 gigs a year at that time.

== Later musical career ==
While recording and touring with the Mustat Lasit, Haavisto produced a radio program for the Finnish radio station Radio City together with Mitja Tuurala. The program concentrated on older Americana, e.g. surf music, which in 1988 led to the formation of a band called Laika & The Cosmonauts, which played surf-oriented music.

Other bands in Haavisto's career have been e.g. TTV, The JP's and Janne Haavisto & The Farangs. In the 2010s he has also played in the bands of Irina Björklund and Erin.

== Career as a record producer ==
As well as working as a musician, Haavisto has had a long career as a recording engineer and a record producer. Haavisto says that at one time he played in the bands of J. Karjalainen and Mikko Kuustonen in addition to Laika & The Cosmonauts, and at the same time he would produce seven records per year.

After he left the Mustat Lasit, Haavisto nevertheless continued his cooperation with J. Karjalainen and e.g. produced three albums for him. For one of them, i.e. Tähtilampun alla (‘Underneath the star lamp’), he was awarded an Emma prize for the producer of the year.

== Family ==
Haavisto's father Jukka Haavisto was a well-known musician in Finland, and so is his brother Olli Haavisto, who is 10 years older than him. Their sister Susanna Haavisto is known both as a singer and an actress.

== Positions of trust ==
- Member of the Teosto Award jury, 2007

== Discography ==
=== Solo albums ===
- Welcome Tourist We Take Your Dolar (2000)
- Permanent Jet Lag (2002)
