= Mikko Kuustonen =

Finnish singer-songwriter

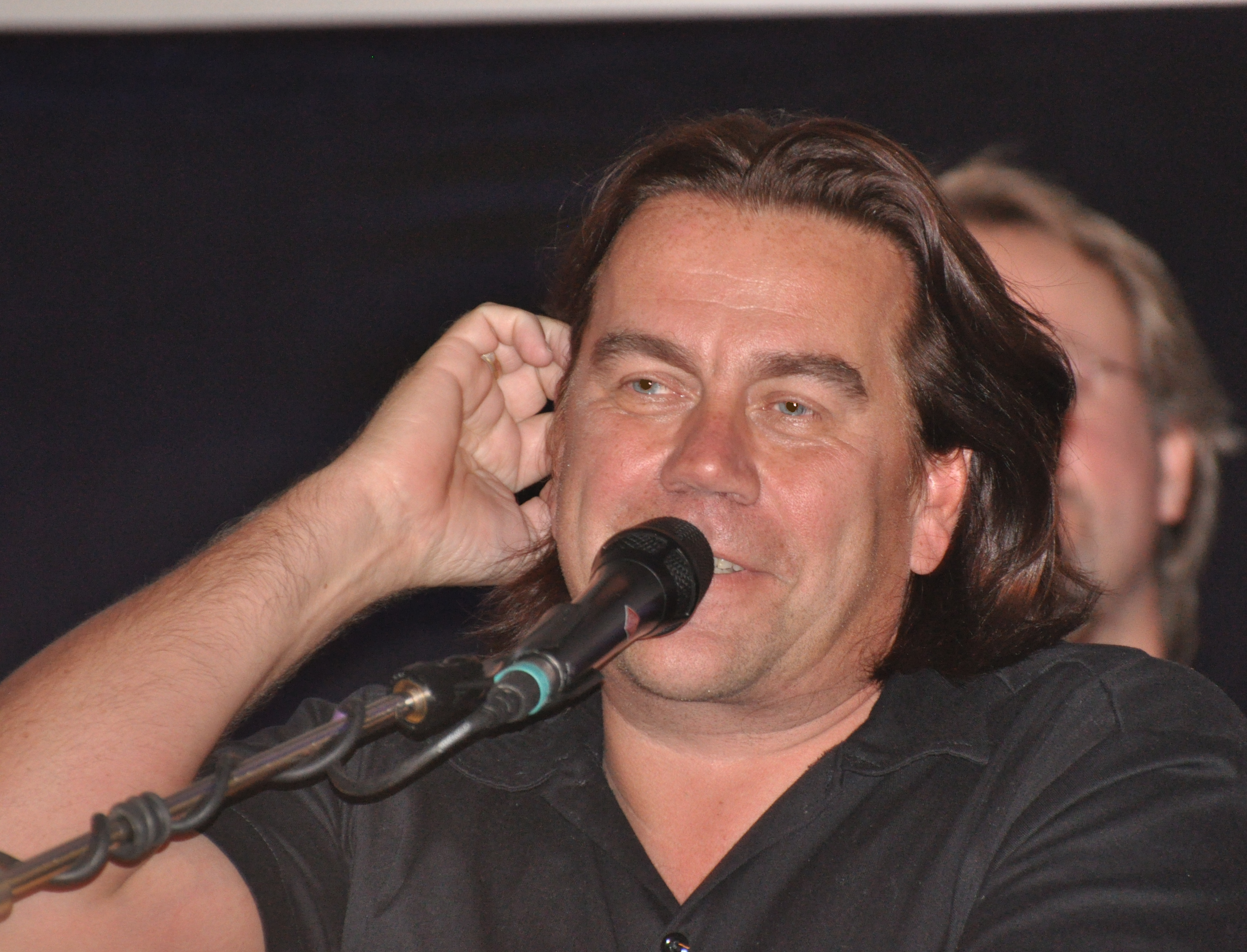
Mikko Kuustonen in 2010.

Ari-Mikko Kuustonen (born 4 March 1960) is a Finnish singer-songwriter and television personality.

Kuustonen was born in Leppävirta. In 1998 Kuustonen was the first Finn to be nominated as a UNFPA Goodwill Ambassador. The following year he was awarded the Church's Peace Prize (Kirkon rauhanpalkinto). In 2003 he was nominated as The Most Positive Finn.

Kuustonen has divorced twice.

Kuustonen's daughters Iina Kuustonen and Minka Kuustonen are both actresses.

== Studio albums ==
- Jää kuuntelemaan (1979)
- Musta jalokivi (1991)
- Abrakadabra (1992)
- Aurora (1994)
- Valon valtakunta (1994)
- Siksak (1996)
- Seepran varjo (1997)
- Atlantis (2000)
- Musta (2003)
- Hietaniemi (2007)
- Profeetta (2008)
- Agricolankatu 11 (2017)
