= Deaths in 2026 =

The following notable deaths occurred in 2026. Names are reported under the date of death, in alphabetical order. A typical entry reports information in the following sequence:

- Name, age, country of citizenship at birth, subsequent nationality (if applicable), what subject was noted for, cause of death (if known), and a reference.

== November ==
=== 23 ===
- Molly Meldrum, 83, Australian music journalist (Countdown), cancer.

=== 22 ===
- Abdul Halim Abdul Samad, 86, Malaysian politician, member (2014–2020) and deputy president (2016–2020) of the Dewan Negara, lung infection.
- David Esrig, 91, Israeli-born Romanian theatre director, founder of the Athanor Academy.
- Milad Farahani, 38, Iranian footballer (Damash Gilan, Naft Tehran, Shahr Khodro), traffic collision.
- Geoff Henke, 99, Australian ice hockey player and Olympic official.
- Georges Khodr, 103, Lebanese Greek Orthodox prelate, archbishop of Byblos and Batroun (1979–2018).
- John Pearce, 66, Canadian Olympic equestrian (2000), cancer. (death announced on this date)
- Rajendra Shukla, 84, Indian poet.
- Ivan Tyutrin, 74, Russian politician, member of the Legislative Duma of Tomsk Oblast (1994–1997). (death announced on this date)
- Ramrao Wadkute, 72, Indian politician, MP (since 2026), heart attack.

=== 21 ===
- Ricardo Acuña, 68, Chilean tennis player. (death announced on this date)
- Paolo Bulgari, 89, Italian fashion designer, chairman of Bulgari (since 1984).
- Bob Chaperon, 68, Canadian snooker player.
- Giovanni De Gennaro, 78, Italian police officer, chief of the Polizia di Stato (2000–2007) and chairman of Leonardo S.p.A. (2013–2020), suicide by gunshot. (body discovered on this date)
- Peter Fluck, 85, British puppeteer and cartoonist (Spitting Image).
- Dudu Georgescu, 76, Romanian football player (Dinamo București, national team) and manager (Dunărea Călărași). (body discovered on this date)
- Mehdi Golshani, 87, Iranian theoretical physicist.
- Jon Henricks, 91, Australian swimmer, double Olympic champion (1956).
- Albert Ivanov, 88, Russian writer, screenwriter (Seven Old Men and a Girl) and lyricist.
- Märt Kubo, 82, Estonian theatre critic and politician, minister of culture (1992) and MP (1995–1999).
- Massimo Martelli, 69, Italian screenwriter and director (Bar Sport).
- David McKittrick, 77, British journalist (The Independent, The Irish Times) and author (Lost Lives). (death announced on this date)
- Nai Thuwanna, 87, Burmese politician, minister of labour (2021–2025).
- Fred Nile, 92, Australian Christian minister and politician, New South Wales MLC (1981–2023).
- Petit Sory, 81, Guinean footballer (Hafia, national team, 1968 Olympics).
- Joe Wallach, 103, American television broadcasting executive, co-founder of Telemundo. (death announced on this date)
- Frank White, 87, British politician, MP (1974–1983) and mayor of Bolton (2005–2006). (death announced on this date)

=== 20 ===
- Luis Y. Aragón, 96, Mexican painter and sculptor.
- Abderrahman Ben Azzedine, 92, Tunisian Olympic footballer (1960).
- Jason Bhugwandass, 28, Dutch activist and peer support specialist, complications from functional neurological symptom disorder and Lance–Adams syndrome.
- Roy Coyle, 80, Northern Ireland football player (Glentoran, national team) and manager (Glentoran).
- Friedrich Christian Flick, 82, German art collector, founder of the Friedrich Christian Flick Collection, complications from a fall.
- Takatoshi Ishibashi, 58, Japanese basketball player (Toyama Grouses) and coach (Saitama Broncos, Tokyo Hachioji Bee Trains).
- Tom Jackson, 75, American football player (Denver Broncos) and analyst (NFL Primetime).
- Herman Kristoffersen, 79, Norwegian politician, mayor of Tromsø (1999–2007).
- Sapam Kunjakeswor Singh, 67, Indian politician, Manipur MLA (2007–2012, since 2022).
- Grzegorz Lindenberg, 71, Polish journalist (Gazeta Wyborcza, Super Express) and sociologist.
- Herbert Morales, 64, Russian reggae musician (Jah Division).
- Phumzile Mlambo-Ngcuka, 71, South African politician, deputy president (2005–2008), executive director of UN Women (2013–2021), complications from a medical procedure.
- Phool Chand Mullana, 85, Indian politician, four-time Haryana MLA.
- PJ Simon, 46, Filipino basketball player (Magnolia Hotshots, Hapee Fresh Fighters, Davao Occidental Tigers).
- Marianna Sutadi, 85, Indonesian diplomat and jurist.
- Jonathan Yardley, 87, American book critic (The Washington Post, The Washington Star) and author.
- Alla Yeryomenko, 85, Russian politician, member of the State Council of the Udmurt Republic (1995–1999).

=== 19 ===
- Corrado Augias, 91, Italian journalist (La Repubblica, L'Espresso), writer and politician, MEP (1994–1999).
- V. S. Babu, 75, Indian politician, Tamil Nadu MLA (2006–2011, since 2026), cardiac arrest.
- Roger Boulanger, 100, French teacher and last survivor of the Natzweiler-Struthof concentration camp.
- E.J. Carroll, 66, American actor (The Wrestler, Boardwalk Empire, The Deuce).
- Ian Cauble, 46, American sommelier (Somm) and entrepreneur, lymphoma.
- Stan Cliburn, 69, American baseball player (California Angels) and manager (Southern Maryland Blue Crabs, Rochester Red Wings).
- Allan Dempsie, 44, Scottish footballer (Elgin City, Ayr United, Albion Rovers).
- Reinaldo Dennes, 70, American convicted murderer, execution by lethal injection.
- Fiona, 9, American Nile hippopotamus (Cincinnati Zoo), complications from an intestinal blockage.
- Youcef Gamouh, 39, Algerian football referee (Algerian Ligue Professionnelle 1, 2023 Africa Cup of Nations).
- Epifanio González, 68, Paraguayan football referee (1998 FIFA World Cup).
- David Habib, 65, French politician, MP (since 2002).
- Wally Horn, 92, American politician, member of the Iowa Senate (1983–2019) and House of Representatives (1973–1983).
- Bobby Ray Inman, 95, American navy admiral, NSA director (1977–1981), CIA deputy director (1981–1982).
- Sajjad Jawad, 30, Iraqi bodybuilder.
- Abu Nasar Khan Choudhury, 91, Indian politician, West Bengal MLA (2009–2016).
- Mikhail Kleandrov, 80, Russian jurist, judge of the Constitutional Court (2003–2016).
- Tommy Mars, 75, American keyboardist (Frank Zappa).
- Thomas Mitchell Overton, 71, American convicted murderer (murders of Michael and Missy MacIvor), execution by lethal injection.
- Bobby Moffat, 81, English footballer (Dallas Tornado, Margate, Gillingham).
- Dmitry Polikanov, 50, Russian political scientist.
- Kobi Recht, 79, Israeli singer and composer.
- Leon Rice, 75, Australian footballer (Hawthorn).
- Larry Schneider, 88, Canadian politician, MP (1988–1993).
- Ludwig Schwarz, 86, Austrian Roman Catholic prelate, bishop of Linz (2005–2015) and auxiliary bishop of Vienna (2001–2005).
- Don Sornrabiab, 77, Thai singer, stroke.
- Lydia Tischlerová, 97, Czech psychologist and Holocaust survivor.
- George Trepal, 77, American convicted murderer.
- M. L. Vishwakarma, 90, Indian politician, MP (1996–1998).
- Geoff Whitehorn, 75, English musician (If, Crawler, Procol Harum), complications from cancer treatment.
- George M. Whitesides, 87, American chemist.

=== 18 ===
- Djamel Ould Abbes, 92, Algerian politician, member of the Council of the Nation (2013–2019).
- Eldos Almazov, 29, Kyrgyz stand-up comedian, video blogger and streamer, complications from surgery.
- Nigel Barrow, 89, Barbadian politician, minister for foreign affairs (1985–1986).
- Jordan Brunoli, 31, Australian bass guitarist (Bugs), colorectal cancer.
- Jim Corr, 92, Irish politician, TD (1982) and mayor of Cork (1979–1980, 1996–1997).
- Gary Deal, 86, American weightlifter.
- Halima Ferhat, 85, Moroccan historian.
- Mohamud Abdi Gaab, 76, Somali politician, governor of Hiran (2011–2014). (death announced on this date)
- Lidia Grychtołówna, 98, Polish pianist.
- Sir John Hood, 74, New Zealand university administrator, vice-chancellor of the University of Auckland (1999–2004) and the University of Oxford (2004–2009).
- Bertrand Meheut, 75, French media executive, CEO of Canal+ (2002–2015).
- Xosé Luís Méndez Ferrín, 88, Spanish writer and poet.
- Ahmed Morsi, 96, Egyptian-born American artist.
- Sakuntala Narasimhan, 86, Indian singer, journalist and consumer rights activist.
- Park Chan-jong, 87, South Korean politician, MP (1973–1981, 1985–1996).
- Petre Poalelungi, 85, Romanian Olympic wrestler (1972).
- Larry Poindexter, 66, American actor and singer (S.W.A.T., Days of Our Lives, The Hard Times of RJ Berger), injuries sustained in a traffic collision.
- Don Rigazio, 92, American ice hockey player (Indianapolis Chiefs, Louisville Rebels, national team), Olympic silver medallist (1956).
- Edmore Sibanda, 49, Zimbabwean footballer (Witbank Spurs, Golden Arrows, national team).
- Sharman Stone, 75, Australian politician, MP (1996–2016), euthanasia.
- Mark Timlin, 82, British crime fiction writer.
- Jovesa Vocea, Fijian politician, MP (since 2022).
- C. T. C. Wall, 89, British mathematician (Brauer–Wall group, Wall theorems), president of the London Mathematical Society (1978–1980).
- Bobby Wilson, 83, Scottish football player (Cowdenbeath, Dundee) and manager (Ross County).
- Tadeusz Wojciechowski, 101, Polish economist, academic and participant in the Warsaw Uprising.

=== 17 ===
- Jorrybell Agoto, 32, Filipino actress (Filipiñana, AraBella, When This Is All Over), lymphoma.
- Fouad Allam, 91, Egyptian security official and politician.
- Ralph Brand, 89, Scottish footballer (Rangers, Manchester City, national team).
- Lance Broadway, 43, American baseball player (Chicago White Sox, New York Mets) and actor (Olympus Has Fallen).
- Daphne Clair, 87, New Zealand writer.
- Lutz van Dijk, 71, German-Dutch writer and educator.
- Yutaka Enatsu, 78, Japanese baseball player (Hanshin Tigers, Nankai Hawks, Hiroshima Toyo Carp), complications from diabetes.
- María Concepción García Gainza, 88, Spanish art historian, educator, and writer.
- Dixie L. Leavitt, 97, American politician, member of the Utah House of Representatives (1963–1964) and Senate (1965–1976, 1989–1992).
- Yuri Lyapkin, 81, Russian ice hockey player, Olympic champion (1976) and four-time world champion.
- Andrei Makarov, 51, Russian politician, Kirov Oblast MLA (since 2026).
- Marek Jan Malinowski, 88, Polish political scientist and Africanist, professor (University of Gdańsk).
- Fred B. Mitchell, 78, American sportswriter (Chicago Tribune), leukemia.
- Krishna Bahadur Rai, Indian politician, Sikkim MLA (2019–2024).
- Nabeel Rajab, 62, Bahraini human rights activist.
- Oreste Ramos, 80, Puerto Rican intellectual, lawyer and politician.
- Eric S. Rubin, 65, American diplomat, ambassador to Bulgaria (2016–2019).
- Peter Storey, 81, English footballer (Arsenal, Fulham, national team).
- Phira Thetwisan, 47, Thai singer and guitarist (Peacemaker), suicide.
- Oleg Viktorov, 65, Russian politician, member of the State Council of the Chuvash Republic (1998–2002, 2006–2011).
- Skipper Voss, 82, American rodeo bullfighter.
- Hossein Wahid Khorasani, 105, Iranian grand ayatollah.
- Reed Waller, 77, American comic book writer and artist ("Omaha" the Cat Dancer).
- Bill Watts, 87, American Hall of Fame professional wrestler (NWA) and wrestling promoter (UWF, WCW).
- Blas Ziarreta, 79, Spanish football manager (Sestao, Erandio, Eibar).
- Herrmann Zschoche, 91, German film director (Bürgschaft für ein Jahr, Leben zu zweit, Engel im Fegefeuer) and screenwriter.

=== 16 ===
- Maria Baliszewska, 79, Polish ethnomusicologist and radio journalist.
- Yvon Biefnot, 90, Belgian politician, MP (1977–1995), Walloon deputy (1995–1999).
- Vinny Chase, 40, American rapper, traffic collision.
- Jürgen Chrobog, 86, German lawyer and diplomat, ambassador to the United States (1995–2001).
- Silvio Demanuele, 65, Maltese footballer (Floriana, national team).
- Sir David Evennett, 77, British politician, MP (1983–1997, 2005–2024).
- Cristian-Paul Ichim, 51, Romanian politician, deputy (2020–2024).
- Napaleonas Kitkauskas, 95, Lithuanian restoration architect, construction engineer and cultural activist.
- K. P. Prabhakaran Nair, 88, Indian agronomist.
- Noa Nakada, 23, Japanese actress (Ultraman Teo).
- Nazar-ur-Rehman, 97, Pakistani Islamic preacher.
- Mikhail Poltoranin, 86, Russian journalist (Moskovskaya Pravda) and politician, deputy prime minister (1992).
- Lee Reeves, 31, Irish boxer, infection.
- Danny Rubinstein, 88, Israeli journalist (Haaretz).
- Lloyd Scott, 65, English footballer (Blackpool) and charity fundraiser.
- Greg Server, 87, American politician, member of the Indiana Senate (1981–2005).
- Russell Targ, 92, American physicist and parapsychologist.
- Nicolas Tiangaye, 70, Central African politician and lawyer, prime minister (2013–2014).
- Yukio Yamagata, 69, Japanese singer and actor (Hyakujuu Sentai Gaoranger, Shuriken Sentai Nininnger).
- Petr Zeman, 52, Czech criminologist.
- Ivan Zhuravlyov, 99, Ukrainian-born Russian politician, member of the Supreme Soviet of the Mari ASSR (1980–1990).

=== 15 ===
- Ehtiram Aliyev, 54, Azerbaijani colonel (First Nagorno-Karabakh War).
- Alfredo Azinheira, 77, Portuguese musician and singer.
- Tom Bunk, 80, German cartoonist (Garbage Pail Kids).
- John Christ, 61, American musician (Danzig, Samhain).
- Miguel Ángel Félix Gallardo, 80, Mexican drug lord (Guadalajara Cartel), complications from multiple organ failure.
- Antonio Franco, 89, Italian Roman Catholic prelate, apostolic nuncio to Ukraine (1992–1999), the Philippines (1999–2006) and Israel (2006–2012).
- Tim Holden, 69, American politician, member of the U.S. House of Representatives (1993–2013).
- Vangelis Ioannidis, 78, Greek actor (Young Aphrodites, O striglos pou egine arnaki).
- Diana Johnstone, 92, American political writer.
- Mark S. Massa, 76, American Catholic priest and academic.
- John Pardoe, 92, British politician, MP (1966–1979).
- Antoni Poveda, 71, Spanish politician and journalist, mayor of Sant Joan Despí (2006–2021) and senator (since 2021).
- Tadeusz Różycki, 95, Polish participant in the Warsaw Uprising.
- Dino Sani, 94, Brazilian footballer (São Paulo, AC Milan, national team), world champion (1958).
- Ted Smale, 94, Canadian football player (Ottawa Rough Riders).
- Ken St. Andre, 79, American game designer (Tunnels & Trolls, Wasteland).
- Teuea Toatu, 65, I-Kiribati politician, vice-president (since 2019), minister of finance and economic development (since 2016) and MP (since 2016), cancer.
- Bill Watters, 83, Canadian sports media personality (Hockey Central).

=== 14 ===
- Bob Allen, 81, American politician, member of the Pennsylvania House of Representatives (1989–2006).
- Giri Babu, 83, Indian actor (Karunamayudu, Kurukshetram) and director (Nee Sukhame Ne Koruthunna).
- Purabi Basu, 77, Bangladeshi poet.
- Vatsilov Davudov, 31, Russian judoka and sambo practitioner, shot.
- Michel Destot, 80, French politician, MP (1988–2017) and mayor of Grenoble (1995–2014).
- Eddie Eckstein, 86, South African musician (The Bats), comedian and actor.
- Carlo Favre, 77, Italian Olympic skier (1972, 1976).
- Gebhard Galle, 105, American World War II veteran, survivor of the attack on Pearl Harbor.
- Bob Hoskins, 90, American Christian missionary, founder of OneHope, lung cancer.
- Freeman Johnson, 106, American World War II veteran, survivor of the attack on Pearl Harbor.
- Akira Kurabayashi, 56, Japanese video game programmer and designer (Street Fighter EX, Endless Ocean, Darius Gaiden), heart failure.
- Ole Lund, 92, Norwegian barrister and industrial leader.
- Lloyd Matthews, 83, Canadian politician, Newfoundland and Labrador MHA (1993–2003).
- Agron Memedi, 46, Macedonian footballer (Shkëndija, Metalurg Skopje, national team), heart attack.
- Jorma Sandelin, 90, Finnish Olympic archer (1972).
- Ken Sanders, 85, American baseball player (Milwaukee Brewers, New York Mets, Cleveland Indians), cancer.
- László Sáry, 86, Hungarian composer, pianist, and music educator.
- Jean-Louis Sbille, 78, Belgian radio producer.
- Yevhen Shakh, 80, Ukrainian actor and voice actor.
- M. K. Shivajilingam, 69, Sri Lankan politician, MP (2001–2010).
- Richard Sterban, 83, American Hall of Fame singer (The Oak Ridge Boys), four-time Grammy winner, bronchitis and pneumonia.
- Joshua Tijani, 34, Ghanaian footballer (Wa All Stars, Ashanti Gold, national team). (death announced on this date)
- Paddy Turner, 87, Irish footballer (Dundalk, Morton, national team).
- Omar Walcott, 61, Venezuelan Olympic basketball player (1992), lung cancer.
- Mike Wise, 62, American sports columnist (ESPN).

=== 13 ===
- Zahidi Zainul Abidin, 65, Malaysian politician, Perlis MLA (1999–2008), MP (2013–2022), kidney failure.
- Nikolai Biryulya, 89, Russian puppeteer and theatre director.
- Lucio Chiquito Caicedo, 110, Colombian engineer.
- Dan Carney, 95, American business executive, co-founder of Pizza Hut.
- Aline Desjardins, 92, Canadian journalist (Ici Radio-Canada Première) and television presenter.
- Gualberto Fernández, 85, Salvadoran football player (Alianza, national team) and manager (Independiente).
- Dvora Hacohen, 89, Israeli historian. (death announced on this date)
- Dan Hall, 48, British-born Australian musician (Taxiride).
- Thore Henki Holm Hansen, 82, Norwegian musician and outlaw biker.
- C. S. Karnan, 71, Indian jurist, judge of the Madras High Court (2009–2016) and the Calcutta High Court (2016–2017).
- Zbigniew Kozub, 66, Polish composer and academic.
- Jesse Mashburn, 93, American sprinter, Olympic champion (1956).
- Norayr Mehrabyan, 85, Armenian ballet dancer and choreographer.
- Mohamed Osman al-Mirghani, 90, Sudanese politician.
- Mondonguito, 67, Peruvian comedian, pulmonary fibrosis.
- Peter Moran, 91, Scottish Roman Catholic prelate, bishop of Aberdeen (2003–2011).
- Wolf-Dietrich Niemeier, 79, German classical archaeologist.
- Tony Pulguita, 63, Chilean clown, cancer.
- John Reilly, 68, American politician, member of the Michigan House of Representatives (2017–2023), injuries sustained in a traffic collision.
- Jaroslav Šuvarský, 85, Czech Orthodox priest.
- Guðjón Þórðarson, 71, Icelandic football player (Íþróttabandalag Akraness, national team) and manager (Stoke City), complications from Parkinson's disease.
- Praneetsilpa Vacharapol, 94, Thai newspaper executive, chairwoman of Thairath (since 1996).
- Richard Weize, 81, German writer and record label founder (Bear Family Records).
- Masaaki Yamazaki, 84, Japanese politician, member (since 1992) and president (2013–2016) of the Senate, deputy chief cabinet secretary (2003–2005), aspiration pneumonia.
- Theodore Zeldin, 93, British historian and academic.

=== 12 ===
- Karl Johan Åström, 92, Swedish control theorist.
- Michael Bayham, 52, American politician, member of the Louisiana House of Representatives (since 2024), liver failure.
- Pierre Bellocq, 99, French-born American cartoonist.
- Archie Blue, 86, Scottish-born Australian footballer (Exeter City, APIA, Australia national team).
- Vyacheslav Briukhovetskyi, 79, Ukrainian literary scholar and pedagogue, rector of the National University of Kyiv-Mohyla Academy (1991–2007).
- Toni Capuozzo, 77, Italian journalist and writer.
- Augusto Alves da Rocha, 93, Brazilian Roman Catholic prelate, bishop of Picos (1975–2001), Oeiras-Floriano (2001–2008) and Floriano (2008–2010).
- Kevin Dillon, 85, Irish Gaelic footballer (Clonakilty, Cork).
- Peter Iden, 88, German theater and art critic (Frankfurter Rundschau), museum director (Museum für Moderne Kunst), academic teacher (Frankfurt University of Music and Performing Arts).
- Hwang Jang-lee, 81, South Korean taekwondo practitioner and actor (Drunken Master, Snake in the Eagle's Shadow, Hitman in the Hand of Buddha).
- Jim McDermott, 89, American politician, member of the U.S. House of Representatives (1989–2017).
- Aloysius Murwito, 75, Indonesian Roman Catholic prelate, bishop of Agats (since 2002).
- Hubert Orłowski, 89, Polish Germanist, literary scholar and cultural scholar.
- Hiromi Ōta, 71, Japanese singer.
- James Pavatt, 73, American convicted murderer (murder of Rob Andrew), execution by lethal injection.
- Jan Pijnenburg, 70, Dutch drummer (Doe Maar).
- Jean Puech, 84, French politician, minister of agriculture (1993–1995) and of civil service (1995–1997).
- Satrucharla Vijaya Rama Raju, 78, Indian politician, MP (1989–1996, 1998–1999).
- John Allen Rubio, 46, American convicted murderer (2003 Brownsville child murders), execution by lethal injection.
- Koh Hock Seng, 81, Malaysian Olympic field hockey player (1964, 1968).
- Rizq Abu Shaeera, Palestinian surgeon, killed in Israeli airstrike.
- Claudette Soares, 91, Brazilian singer.
- Dionísio Mendes de Sousa, 86, Portuguese politician, president of the Legislative Assembly of the Azores (1995–1996).
- S. M. Srinivasan, 86, Indian artist.
- Eldon Stroburg, 99, American politician, member of the Iowa House of Representatives (1969–1971).
- Brian Tracy, 82, Canadian-American motivational speaker.
- Young L, 39, American rapper (The Pack) and record producer ("Vans"). (death announced on this date)
- Zee Zee Top, 27, British Thoroughbred racehorse.

=== 11 ===
- Carlos Babington, 77, Argentine football player (Huracán, national team) and manager (Huracán).
- Sir Michael Bett, 91, British business executive and public servant.
- Ujjal Biswas, 72, Indian politician, West Bengal MLA (2011–2026), multiple organ failure.
- Alexander Boksenberg, 90, British scientist.
- Steve Camp, 71, American singer, heart failure.
- Annette Chépy-Léger, 73, French politician, deputy (1981).
- Finn Coren, 65, Norwegian singer-songwriter.
- Laurence Crouzet, 65, French voice actress.
- Alexander Darchiev, 66, Russian diplomat, ambassador to the United States (since 2025).
- F. A. Dry, 95, American college football player (Oklahoma State Cowboys) and coach (Tulsa Golden Hurricane, TCU Horned Frogs).
- Delphi Harrington, 89, American actress (All My Children, Guiding Light, Sully).
- Gabriele Haupt, 84, German Olympic cross-country skier (1972).
- Dan Hicks, 64, American sportscaster (NBC Sports).
- Dick Hoak, 86, American football player and coach (Pittsburgh Steelers).
- Clifford Huskilson, 73, Canadian politician, Nova Scotia MLA (1993–1999).
- Ranald MacLean, Lord MacLean, 87, Scottish judge.
- Hamadou Moustapha, 81, Cameroonian politician.
- Tom O'Brien, 39, Irish jockey, cancer.
- V. B. Price, 86, American poet, columnist and editor.
- Tony Richards, 69, American drummer (W.A.S.P).
- Michael John Roberts, 48, Canadian animator (TripTank, F Is for Family, BoJack Horseman), glioblastoma.
- Oldřich Svojanovský, 80, Czech rower, Olympic silver (1972) and bronze medalist (1976).
- Regina Torné, 82, Mexican actress (The Big Cube, El Chavo del Ocho, Like Water for Chocolate).
- Anna Maria Waldstein-Wartenberg, 98, Czech-Austrian noblewoman and writer.

=== 10 ===
- Héctor Aguer, 83, Argentine Roman Catholic prelate, auxiliary bishop of Buenos Aires (1992–1998), coadjutor archbishop (1998–2000) and archbishop (2000–2018) of La Plata.
- Mörður Árnason, 73, Icelandic politician, MP (2003–2007, 2010–2013).
- Frédéric Boilet, 66, French cartoonist.
- Laura Lee Brown, 85, American heiress, hotelier (21c Museum Hotels) and art collector.
- Marcos Camino, 76, Argentine accordionist (Los Palmeras), suicide by hanging.
- Anthony Clark, 63, American comedian and actor (Yes, Dear, Boston Common, The Rock), septic shock.
- Zuzana Fišárková, 87, Czech actress (Četnické humoresky, Morgiana).
- Ronald Lee Fleming, 85, American town planner.
- Helen Fraser, 84, English actress (Bad Girls, Billy Liar, Gorillas in the Mist).
- Samuel O. Freedman, 98, Canadian immunologist and academic.
- Mike Friedman, 87, American college football coach (CSU Pueblo ThunderWolves).
- Petr Hajn, 91, Czech lawyer and commercial law professor.
- Irma P. Hall, 91, American actress (The Ladykillers, Midnight in the Garden of Good and Evil, Soul Food).
- Dai Henwood, 48, New Zealand comedian, game show host (Family Feud), and television personality (7 Days, Taskmaster New Zealand), bowel cancer.
- Jim Herd, 87, American television production executive and professional wrestling executive (WCW). (death announced on this date)
- Stacy Keach, 85, American actor (Fat City, Titus, Mickey Spillane's Mike Hammer), heart failure.
- Danny Kelly, 69, British journalist (New Musical Express, Q) and radio presenter (talkSPORT), throat cancer.
- Valery Kerdemelidi, 88, Russian gymnast, Olympic silver medallist (1960).
- Tapio Koskinen, 73, Finnish ice hockey player (Ässät, 1976 Olympics).
- Shaji Kumar, 57, Indian cinematographer (Ponnar Shankar, Mambattiyan, Saagasam), heart failure.
- Catherine Laboubée, 71, French historian and writer.
- Dick Lamb, 88, American disc jockey (WGH-AM, WWDE-FM, WVBW-FM), co-founder of Max Media.
- Oleg Lapshin, 89, Russian football manager (women's national team).
- Marsha M. Linehan, 83, American psychologist.
- Don MacAdam, 76, Canadian ice hockey coach (Hungary national team).
- Rhys McConnochie, 89, Australian actor (Come in Spinner, Anzacs, The Man from Snowy River II).
- Arif Mirzayev, 82, Azerbaijani composer.
- Sid Morrison, 93, American politician, member of the U.S. House of Representatives (1981–1993) and Washington secretary of transportation (1993–2001).
- Kevin Murray, 66, American politician, member of the California State Assembly (1994–1998) and Senate (1998–2006).
- Antonello Palombi, 58, Italian operatic tenor.
- Richard Posner, 87, American legal scholar and judge, judge (1981–2017) and chief judge (1993–2000) of the U.S. Court of Appeals for the Seventh Circuit.
- Ninoslav Radovanović, 86, Serbian cardiac surgeon.
- Elisa Ramírez, 82, Spanish actress (Man with the Golden Winchester, The Wanton of Spain, The Troublemaker).
- Bunker Roy, 81, Indian educationist, founder of the Barefoot College.
- Todd Russell, 54, Australian miner, survivor of the Beaconsfield Mine collapse.
- Luciano Tessari, 98, Italian football player (Roma, Palermo) and manager (Roma).
- Ray Tintori, 43, American music video director ("Kids", "Electric Feel", "Spaceman").
- David B. Wingate, 91, Bermudian-born British ornithologist and naturalist.

=== 9 ===
- Brian Ahern, 81, Canadian record producer and guitarist.
- Lenita Airisto, 89, Finnish journalist and socialite.
- Dilyara Alkayeva, 77, Russian jurist, judge of the Constitutional Court of the Republic of Tatarstan (2000–2010).
- Ichgola Androgyn, 66, German actor (A Virus Knows No Morals, Anita: Dances of Vice, I Am My Own Woman) and LGBTQ+ activist.
- Paweł Anweiler, 76, Polish Lutheran clergyman, bishop of Cieszyn (1992–2016).
- Ballabriggs, 25, Irish-bred Thoroughbred racehorse.
- Bob Boone, 78, American baseball player (Philadelphia Phillies, California Angels) and manager (Kansas City Royals), World Series champion (1980).
- David Bratman, 69, American librarian and Tolkien scholar.
- Ronald Canestrari, 83, American politician, member of the New York State Assembly (1989–2012).
- Ben Dekker, 86, South African environmentalist.
- Maurice Hasson, 92, French-Venezuelan violinist.
- Sir Garry Johnson, 89, British army general, pneumonia.
- Badrul Kamal, 80, Indonesian politician, mayor of Depok (2000–2005), lung cancer.
- Vanderlei Lázaro, 79, Brazilian footballer (Corinthians, Cruzeiro).
- Daryl Lilley, 52, New Zealand rugby union player (Taranaki, Canterbury, Hurricanes).
- Abune Lucas, 94, Eritrean Orthodox Tewahedo Church archbishop and administrator of the Office of the Patriarch.
- Robert Marty, 90, French mathematician and semiotician.
- Bob Mills, 79, American furniture store executive.
- Panda Nababan, 82, Indonesian politician, MP (1999–2012).
- Manilal Nag, 87, Indian sitar player.
- Michał Oksiński, 24, Polish spree killer (2026 Kraków shooting), complications from gunshot wounds.
- Tibor Palánkai, 88, Hungarian economist.
- Rita Paul, 99, American visual artist and hotel owner (Washington Square Hotel).
- Francis Pipelin, 93, French racing cyclist.
- Mike Rowland, 89, English wheelwright and coachbuilder.
- Arpita Singh, 89, Indian visual artist.
- Roger Sippl, 71, American software developer (Informix Corporation). (death announced on this date)
- Brian Steele, 97, New Zealand rugby union player (Wellington, Horowhenua, national team).
- Ron Turner, 81, Australian rugby league player (Cronulla-Sutherland Sharks, national team).

=== 8 ===
- Engin Deniz Akarlı, 81, Turkish-American historian.
- Solange Alexandre, 104, French World War II resistance fighter.
- Hubert Ausbie, 88, American basketball player (Harlem Globetrotters).
- Darren Beckford, 59, English footballer (Port Vale, Norwich City, Oldham Athletic).
- Bar Belfer, 37, Israeli actress (Someone to Run With), musician, and radio announcer, epileptic seizure.
- Domenico Berni, 86, Italian Roman Catholic bishop, prelate of the Territorial Prelature of Chuquibambilla (1989–2018).
- Dennis Breakwell, 78, English cricketer (Northamptonshire, Somerset).
- Gordon Britton, 87, Welsh rugby union player (Newport, national team). (death announced on this date)
- Arnaldo Coen, 86, Mexican visual artist (Generación de la Ruptura).
- Ryan Ghietti, 37, Australian rugby league player (Northern Pride, Italy national team).
- Cico Harahap, 48, Malaysian actor (Puteri Impian).
- Skip Hinnant, 86, American actor (Fritz the Cat, The Electric Company, The Easter Bunny Is Comin' to Town).
- Peter Jaroš, 86, Slovak writer (The Millennial Bee) and politician, MNC (1992–1994).
- Paweł Kakietek, 51, Polish Olympic boxer (2000). (death announced on this date)
- Louisa Lesage, 28, French cartoonist and animator, fall.
- Franziska Liebhardt, 44, German shot putter, Paralympic champion (2016).
- Juozapas Matulaitis, 90, Lithuanian Roman Catholic prelate, bishop of Kaišiadorys (1991–2012).
- Johnny McEvoy, 81, Irish singer.
- Dževad Prekazi, 69, Kosovar football player (Partizan, Galatasaray) and coach (Železnik).
- Gerhard Schwenzer, 88, German Roman Catholic prelate, bishop of Oslo (1983–2005).
- Sir Pou Temara, 78, New Zealand linguist and Tikanga Māori scholar.
- Prakash Mani Tripathi, 91, Indian politician, MP (1996–1998, 1999–2004).
- Tommy Walsh, 69, English television presenter and celebrity builder (Ground Force, Homes Under the Hammer).
- Kakule William, Ugandan actor (Who Killed Captain Alex?).
- Jaswant Singh Yadav, 73, Indian politician, MP (1999–2004) and Rajasthan MLA (2008–2018, since 2023).
- Kourosh Zarei, 54, Iranian actor (Prophet Joseph).

=== 7 ===
- Alberta Ampomah, 32, Ghanaian Olympic weightlifter (2012).
- Frank Bergemann, 70, German handball coach (Alpla HC Hard, Erlangen, HBW Balingen-Weilstetten).
- Oleh Bilorus, 87, Ukrainian politician, ambassador of Ukraine to the United States (1992–1994).
- Mike Carter, 71, American-Israeli basketball player (Hapoel Holon, Hapoel Jerusalem, Maccabi Ramat Gan), organ failure.
- Roberto Cervellati, 92, Italian physicist and explorer, traffic collision.
- Wayne Closter, 81, Australian footballer (Geelong).
- Barry Daines, 75, English footballer (Tottenham Hotspur, Mansfield Town, Bulova SA).
- Agneta Ekmanner, 87, Swedish actress (Hugs and Kisses, Duet for Cannibals, The Fire Engine That Disappeared).
- Lidiya Fedoseyeva-Shukshina, 88, Russian actress (Happy Go Lucky, The Red Snowball Tree, The Youth of Peter the Great), heart failure.
- Gary Fisketjon, 72, American book editor, stroke.
- Henryk Grychnik, 93, Polish operatic tenor, soloist of the Silesian Opera (1956–1991).
- Maurice Hasson, 92, French-Venezuelan violinist.
- Jeff Julian, 91, New Zealand Olympic marathon runner (1960, 1964).
- Rick Kessell, 77, Canadian ice hockey player (Pittsburgh Penguins, California Golden Seals).
- Matjaž Kmecl, 92, Slovenian linguist, poet, and politician.
- Blanche Le Bris, 106, French bookseller and Holocaust survivor.
- Leonid Leitman, 95, Russian fencer.
- Richard Lloyd, 75, American guitarist (Television, Rocket from the Tombs), bile duct cancer.
- Lucette Lousteau, 77, French politician, deputy (2012–2017).
- Blanche Martin, 87, American football player (Los Angeles Chargers, New York Titans).
- Željko Matuš, 91, Croatian footballer (Dinamo Zagreb, Yugoslavia national team), Olympic champion (1960).
- Hillary Menard, 92, Canadian ice hockey player (Chicago Blackhawks).
- Ritsuko Nakayama, 84, Japanese bowler and television personality (Takeshi's Castle).
- Enrique Quiñones Garzón, 57, Mexican baseball player (Tomateros de Culiacán), shot.
- Stephen Roberts, 77, Australian footballer (St Kilda).
- Vladimir Romanishin, 67, Belarusian Olympic rower (1988, 1992).
- Bobby Sheehan, 78, American ice hockey player (Montreal Canadiens, Chicago Blackhawks, New York Rangers).
- Kofi Wayo, 71, Ghanaian politician.
- G. William Whitehurst, 101, American politician, member of the U.S. House of Representatives (1969–1987).
- Françoise Woimant, 97, French librarian and art historian.
- Yui Ueda, 52, Japanese golfer.
- Yan Zhen, 95, Chinese poet.
- Raja Muhammad Zulqarnain Khan, 90, Pakistani politician, president of Azad Kashmir (2006–2011).

=== 6 ===
- Leonid Arkayev, 86, Russian Hall of Fame gymnast.
- Arnošt Binter, 98, Czech educator and fitness coach.
- Bismarck, 36, Brazilian footballer (Fortaleza, Espérance de Tunis), shot.
- Moysés Blás, 89, Brazilian basketball player, Olympic bronze medallist (1960).
- David Chelule, 49, Kenyan Olympic long-distance runner (2000).
- T. Cullen Davis, 93, American oil tycoon and murder suspect.
- Dawn Greenhalgh, 93, Canadian actress (Babar, The Virgin Suicides, Maps to the Stars).
- Philip D. Kaltenbacher, 88, American politician, member of the New Jersey General Assembly (1968–1974).
- Yuri Kayurov, 99, Russian actor (The Sixth of July, The Long Farewell, White Snow of Russia).
- Lee Yiok Seng, 87, Singaporean politician, MP (1972–1996).
- Sebastián Lelio, 52, Chilean film director (Gloria, Disobedience, A Fantastic Woman), Oscar winner (2018).
- Billy Little, 86, Scottish football player (Aberdeen, Stirling Albion) and manager (East Stirlingshire).
- Michael Locke, 47, Welsh stuntman (Dirty Sanchez) and skateboarder.
- Sonomyn Luvsangombo, 101, Mongolian military officer and politician, minister of public security (1982–1984) and mayor of Ulaanbaatar (1971–1972).
- Ljubomir Maksimović, 87, Serbian historian.
- Mitsuru Nagai, 91, Japanese pianist.
- Robert Parmet, 87, American author and academic.
- Rosemary Payne, 93, Scottish Olympic discus thrower (1972). (death announced on this date)
- Danuta Beata Postnikoff, 78, Polish journalist, film director, and screenwriter.
- Vezhdi Rashidov, 74, Bulgarian sculptor and politician, minister of culture (2009–2013, 2014–2017) and chairman of the National Assembly (2022–2023), heart attack.
- Ben Reyes, 79, American politician, member of the Texas House of Representatives (1973–1980) and Houston City Council (1980–1996).
- Jay Rockefeller, 89, American politician, governor of West Virginia (1977–1985) and U.S. senator (1985–2015).
- Ádám Rothermel, 78, Hungarian footballer (Tatabánya, Újpesti Dózsa), Olympic silver medallist (1972).
- Billy C. Sanders, 90, American naval officer, master chief petty officer of the Navy (1982–1985).
- Michael Sanft, 55, American attorney (murder of Tupac Shakur). (body discovered on this date)
- Nilton Travesso, 92, Brazilian television director (TV Globo, Rede Bandeirantes, Rede Manchete).
- Konstantin Trenchev, 71, Bulgarian syndicalist, founder and president (1989–2015) of the Confederation of Labour Podkrepa.
- Marko Turina, 89, Croatian cardiac surgeon.
- Platon Udovenko, 85, Ukrainian-born Russian Orthodox prelate.

=== 5 ===
- Ahmed al-Alwani, 57, Iraqi politician.
- Allen Ballard, 96, American author.
- Jean Bardet, 85, French politician, deputy (1986–1988, 1993–2012).
- Julian A. Brodsky, 93, American mass media executive, founder of Comcast.
- Antonio Carattoni, 80, Sammarinese politician, captain regent (2006–2007). (death announced on this date)
- Ali-Asghar Fani, 72, Iranian politician, minister of education (2005, 2013–2016).
- Rochelle Fleming, 72, American singer (First Choice).
- Sir Lloyd Geering, 108, New Zealand theologian.
- David Hewitt, 87, Irish rugby union player (national team, British & Irish Lions).
- Stuart Holland, 86, British economist and politician, MP (1979–1989). (death announced on this date)
- Damian Johnson, 63, American football player (New York Giants, New England Patriots).
- Alan Jones, 80, Australian racing driver, Formula One world champion (1980), cancer.
- Paul Langmack, 61, Australian rugby league player (Canterbury Bulldogs, Western Suburbs) and coach (South Sydney), heart attack.
- Gianpietro Marchetti, 78, Italian footballer (Atalanta, Juventus, national team).
- Pavel Moiseyev, 39, Russian educator and politician, member of the Tambov Oblast Duma (since 2022), traffic collision.
- Gonzalo Moratorio, 44, Uruguayan virologist, cancer.
- Marcel Ndalé, 65–66, Central African militant and warlord, shot.
- Nimeño I, 81, French bullfighter.
- Hossein Omoumi, 82, Iranian musician.
- Nikola Petrov-Korli, 81, Bulgarian illusionist.
- Gianluca Pierobon, 59, Italian racing cyclist.
- John Prausnitz, 98, American chemical engineer.
- Mikhail Vasiliev, 64, Russian ice hockey player (Torpedo Yaroslavl, CSKA Moscow, HC Bozen–Bolzano).
- Patricia Walsh, 74, Argentine politician, deputy (2001–2005), respiratory failure.
- Jeffrey Weisheit, 50, American convicted murderer, execution by lethal injection.

=== 4 ===
- Hubert Aiwanger, 55, German politician, deputy minister-president of Bavaria (since 2018).
- Ray Alborn, 87, American football coach (Rice Owls).
- Drew Allbritten, 79, American politician, member of the Michigan House of Representatives (1979–1980), cancer.
- Edward Anyamkyegh, 48, Nigerian footballer (Sheriff Tiraspol, Karpaty Lviv, Atlantis).
- Janaína Barbosa, 48, Brazilian actress and television presenter (RedeTV!), sepsis.
- Herbert Blomstedt, 99, Swedish-American conductor (Oslo Philharmonic Orchestra, Staatskapelle Dresden, San Francisco Symphony).
- Tinto Brass, 93, Italian film director (Caligula, Salon Kitty, La vacanza) and screenwriter, heart attack.
- Bernard Cafferty, 92, English chess master.
- Ronald D. Castille, 82, American jurist, justice of the Supreme Court of Pennsylvania (1994–2014).
- Vadim Crîcimari, 38, Moldovan footballer (CSCA–Rapid Chișinău, Speranța Crihana Veche, Dacia Buiucani), cancer.
- Steve Davidson, 67, American science fiction editor (Amazing Stories).
- María Alicia Delgado, 77, Mexican actress (Monteverde, La vecina, Enamorándome de Ramón) and comedian.
- David Del Valle, 77, American film historian, esophageal cancer.
- Donnie Dunagan, 92, American actor (Bambi, Son of Frankenstein, Tower of London) and Marine Corps major, lung cancer.
- Fred Forest, 93, French media artist.
- Yoshiaki Ishizawa, 89, Japanese academic.
- Subramaniam Hariharan Iyer, Indian human rights lawyer.
- Tom Jensen, 77, American politician, member of the Kentucky House of Representatives (1985–1987, 1989–1997) and Senate (2005–2012).
- Jesús María de Jesús Moya, 91, Dominican Roman Catholic prelate, auxiliary bishop of Santiago de los Caballeros (1977–1984) and bishop of San Francisco de Macorís (1984–2012).
- Kimmarie Johnson, 50, American actress (The Summer of Massacre), businesswoman, and model, complications from a heart aneurysm.
- Jack Mapanje, 82, Malawian writer and poet (Of Chameleons and Gods).
- Billy Martindale, 88, American golfer, lung disease.
- Drew McMaster, 69, British Olympic sprinter (1980).
- Carlo Molinari, 93, French businessman, president of FC Metz (1967–1978, 1983–2009).
- Léone Nogarède, 100, French actress (Cartouche, King of Paris).
- Victor Pânzaru, 73, Moldovan poet and translator.
- Nicolas P. Retsinas, 79, American economist.
- Bernardo Rogora, 87, Italian footballer (Padova, Fiorentina, Brescia).
- Pierre Rosenthal, 65, French role-playing game designer.
- Toukie Smith, 74, American actress (227, I Like It Like That, Miami Vice) and model, complications from multiple sclerosis.
- Alessandro Staccioli, 94, Italian Roman Catholic prelate, vicar apostolic of Luang Prabang (1968–1975) and auxiliary bishop of Siena–Colle di Val d'Elsa–Montalcino (1975–1990).
- Liudvikas Žukauskas, 73, Lithuanian politician.

=== 3 ===
- Carlos Albert, 83, Mexican footballer (Necaxa, national team).
- Toni Brogno, 53, Belgian footballer (Olympic Charleroi, Westerlo, national team), liver cancer.
- June Carpenter, 88, American Shaker.
- Frank Doran, 93, American aikido teacher.
- John Frieda, 75, British hairstylist, cancer.
- Marta Gastón, 53, Spanish economist and politician, senator (2004–2008) and deputy (2008–2011), cancer.
- Harold Greene, 82, American news anchor (KABC-TV, KCBS-TV, KCAL-TV).
- Janosch, 95, German children's author and illustrator.
- Paul Kihara Kariuki, 72, Kenyan lawyer and politician, attorney general (2018–2022).
- Nand Lal, 72, Indian politician, Himachal Pradesh MLA (since 2007).
- Daniel Marguerat, 83, Swiss theologian and Biblical scholar.
- Jesús de Miguel, 30, Spanish footballer (Castellón, Unionistas, Tenerife), blunt cardiac injury.
- Herman Morse, 77, American politician, member of the Missouri House of Representatives (2017–2025), cardiac arrest.
- John Nicks, 97, British-American Olympic pair skater (1948, 1952) and figure skating coach, world champion (1953).
- Yekaterina Raikina, 89, Russian actress.
- Peggy Rathmann, 73, American illustrator and author.
- Paul-Henri Rebut, 90–91, French nuclear physicist.
- Eliana Rocha, 82, Brazilian actress (Pé na Cova, Negócio da China).
- Dulcy Singer, 92, American television producer (Sesame Street), Emmy Award winner (1979).
- Kjeld Thorst, 86, Danish football player (AaB, national team) and manager.
- Georges Werler, 88, French actor (Haine, Les Cinq Dernières Minutes, Julien Fontanes, magistrat) and stage director.
- Simon Winchester, 82, British-American author (The Surgeon of Crowthorne), heart attack.
- Jan Władysław Woś, 87, Polish historian and bibliophile.

=== 2 ===
- Clem Cattini, 89, English drummer (The Tornados, Johnny Kidd & the Pirates, Apollo 100), fall.
- Tobias Joaquim Dai, 75, Mozambican politician, minister of defence (2000–2008).
- Patrik Eichler, 42, Czech journalist (Literární noviny) and political commentator. (death announced on this date)
- Metin Ergin, 59, Turkish diplomat.
- Erminia Ferrari, 94, Italian model and costume designer.
- Taurian Fontenette, 43, American basketball (Dallas Generals) and streetball player.
- Capers Funnye, 74, American rabbi, cancer.
- Jeannot Gilbert, 85, Canadian ice hockey player (Hershey Bears, Quebec Nordiques, Boston Bruins).
- Stelios Gousios, 89, Greek basketball player (Aris B.C., national team).
- Herb Grubel, 92, German-born Canadian academic and politician, MP (1993–1997).
- Hassan Habibi, 86, Iranian Olympic football player (1964) and manager.
- Georg Hack, 76, German speedway rider.
- John Killacky, 74, American politician, member of the Vermont House of Representatives (2019–2022) and intermedia artist, prostate cancer.
- Ignatiy Lapkin, 87, Russian Orthodox preacher and author.
- Ashok Kumar Mahapatra, 73, Indian neurosurgeon, stroke.
- Josef Mašín, 94, Czech anti-communist resistance fighter and defector.
- Lucia Modugno, 94, Italian actress (For a Few Dollars Less, My Name is Pecos, Navajo Joe).
- Don Murray, 80, Scottish footballer (Cardiff City, Heart of Midlothian, Newport County), complications from Lewy body dementia.
- Freddie Mwila, 80, Zambian footballer (Rhokana United, Atlanta Chiefs, national team).
- M. Ramachandran, 80, Indian politician, Tamil Nadu MLA (1989–1991, 1996–2001, 2016–2021), cardiac arrest.
- Luis Rico, 81, Bolivian singer-songwriter.
- Patty Ross, 70, American actress (Spotlight, Thief, Spenser Confidential).
- Nadia Santini, 72, Italian chef (Dal Pescatore).
- Jagdish Raj Sapolia, 80, Indian politician, Jammu and Kashmir MLA (1987–1996, 2008–2014).
- Aranka Siegal, 96, Ukrainian-born American Holocaust survivor and writer (Upon the Head of the Goat).
- Marin Srakić, 89, Croatian Roman Catholic prelate, auxiliary bishop (1990–1996), coadjutor bishop (1996–1997) and archbishop (1997–2013) of Đakovo–Osijek.
- Lonnie Thompson, 78, American paleoclimatologist.
- Beverly Whipple, 85, American sexologist and academic (The G Spot and Other Recent Discoveries About Human Sexuality), complications from Alzheimer's disease.
- Ahmet Nazif Zorlu, 82, Turkish industrialist, chairman of Zorlu Holding, cancer.

=== 1 ===
- Hamid Alidoosti, 70, Iranian football player (Daraei, national team) and manager (Sorkhpooshan), cardiac arrest complicated by prostate and bone cancer.
- Al Barkow, 93, American golf journalist and historian.
- Jacques Bolognesi, 79, French jazz musician (Orchestre National de Jazz).
- Tony Butala, 87, American singer (The Lettermen).
- Shirley Chow, 76, Malaysian bowler.
- Gerry Collins, 88, Irish politician, minister for foreign affairs (1982, 1989–1992), TD (1967–1997), and MEP (1994–2004).
- Kay Dickersin, 74, American epidemiologist.
- Ate Gay, 55, Filipino comedian and television presenter (Comedy Bar, Wowowillie), stroke complicated by mucoepidermoid carcinoma.
- Pavel Hulva, 50, Czech zoologist and academic (Charles University).
- Ellis Johnson, 83, American football player (Boston Patriots).
- Jerry Koosman, 83, American baseball player (New York Mets, Minnesota Twins, Chicago White Sox), World Series champion (1969), heart failure.
- John Leeson, 83, English actor (Doctor Who, Rainbow, K9).
- Ciara Mageean, 34, Irish Olympic middle-distance runner (2016, 2020), bowel cancer.
- Miquel Navarro, 81, Spanish sculptor, painter and poet.
- Antonio Navarro Wolff, 78, Colombian guerrilla leader (M-19) and politician, senator (2002–2006, 2014–2018).
- Don O'Hara, 93, Australian footballer (Geelong).
- Arthur Peters, 90, Canadian Anglican clergyman, bishop of Nova Scotia and Prince Edward Island (1984–2002).
- Ved Rahi, 93, Indian film director (Veer Savarkar, Gul Gulshan Gulfaam) and screenwriter (Kali Ghata).
- QABM Rahman, 91, Bangladeshi government official.
- Adam Robinson, 45, American technology founder, plane crash.
- Waldemar Roszkiewicz, 69, Polish dentist and politician.
- Frank Howell Seay, 88, American jurist, judge (since 1979) and chief judge (1980–1996) of the U.S. District Court for the Eastern District of Oklahoma.
- Todd Shell, 64, American football player (San Francisco 49ers) and coach.
- Pavel Žák, 85, Czech composer and lyricist.
- Regina Ziegler, 82, German film and television producer (A Year of the Quiet Sun, Rosa Luxemburg, Fabian).

== Previous months ==
- Deaths in January 2026
- Deaths in February 2026
- Deaths in March 2026
- Deaths in April 2026
- Deaths in May 2026
- Deaths in June 2026
- Deaths in July 2026
- Deaths in August 2026
- Deaths in September 2026
- Deaths in October 2026
