= Yumio Sakurai =

Japanese historian

Sakurai Yumio
- Born: January 31, 1945; Tsuruga, Fukui, Empire of Japan
- Died: December 17, 2012 (aged 67); Tokyo, Japan
- Education: University of Tokyo (1967); University of Kyoto (1977)
- Scientific career
- Fields: History of Japan
- Workplaces: University of Tokyo

Yumio Sakurai (桜井 由躬雄; 1945-2012) was a Japanese historian who specialized in Japanese history and history of Southeast Asia.

== Early life ==
Samurai attended the University of Tokyo and obtained a PhD in Literature and also a PhD in Agriculture. He also received an honorary doctorate from the National University of Vietnam.

== Publications ==
=== Author ===
- "The Formation of Vietnamese villages.: Village Shared Fields = Historical Development of Condien System" =ベトナム村落の形成——村落共有田=コンディエン制の史的展開 Betonamu sonraku no keisei) (Sōbunsha, 1987)
- "The Melancholy of Hanoi" (Mekong 1989)
- ("Green Field: Walking the History of Southeast Asia" =『緑色の野帖——東南アジアの歴史を歩く』 (Mekong 1997)
- "People living in rice: the baldness of the sun, the kindness of forests and water" = 『米に生きる人々——太陽のはげまし、森と水のやさしさ』 Shueisha 2000)
- "History of Southeast Asia" (The Open University of Japan 2002)
- "Pre-modern Southeast Asia" (The Open University of Japan 2006)

=== Coauthor or co-editor ===
- (with Yoshiaki Ishizawa) "Modern History of Southeast Asia (3) Vietnam, Cambodia, Laos". (東南アジア現代史（3）ヴェトナム・カンボジア・ラオス; editor: Yoshiaki Ishizawa) (Yamakawa Publishing Co., Ltd., 1977) (Yamakawa Shuppansha, 1977)
- (Yoneo Ishii) "Visual Version" World History (12) Formation of the Southeast Asian World "(Kodansha, 1985)
- (Yoshiaki Ishizawa, Noboru Kiriyama) "World History from the Region (4) Southeast Asia" (Asahi Shimbun, 1993)

=== Editor ===
- "Vietnam I Want to Know More" (Koubundou Publishers, 1989 / 2nd Edition, 1995)
- "Iwanami Lecture: History of Southeast Asia (4) Development of Early Modern Southeast Asian Countries" (Iwanami Shoten, 2001)

=== Co-editor ===
- (Tadayo Watabe) "Rice Culture in Gangnam, China: Its Interdisciplinary Study" (Japan Broadcast Publishing Association, 1984)
- (Yoneo Ishii) "History of Southeast Asia (1) Continental Region" (Yamakawa Shuppansha, 1999)
- (Shiro Momoki) "Vietnamese Encyclopedia" (Dohosha, 1999)

=== Translation Editor ===
- George Cœdès, History of Indochina Civilization (Misuzu Shobo, 1969)
