= Viktorov =

Viktorov (Russian: Викторов) is a Russian surname that is derived from the male given name Viktor and literally means Viktor's. Notable people with the surname include:

- Maxim Viktorov (born 1972), Russian banker and politician
- Mikhail Viktorov (1893–1938), Russian military leader
- Oleg Viktorov (1960–2026), Russian politician

== See also ==
- 17176 Viktorov, main-belt asteroid
