= German Archaeological Institute at Athens =

German research institute in Greece

Coordinates: 37°58′57″N 23°43′55″E

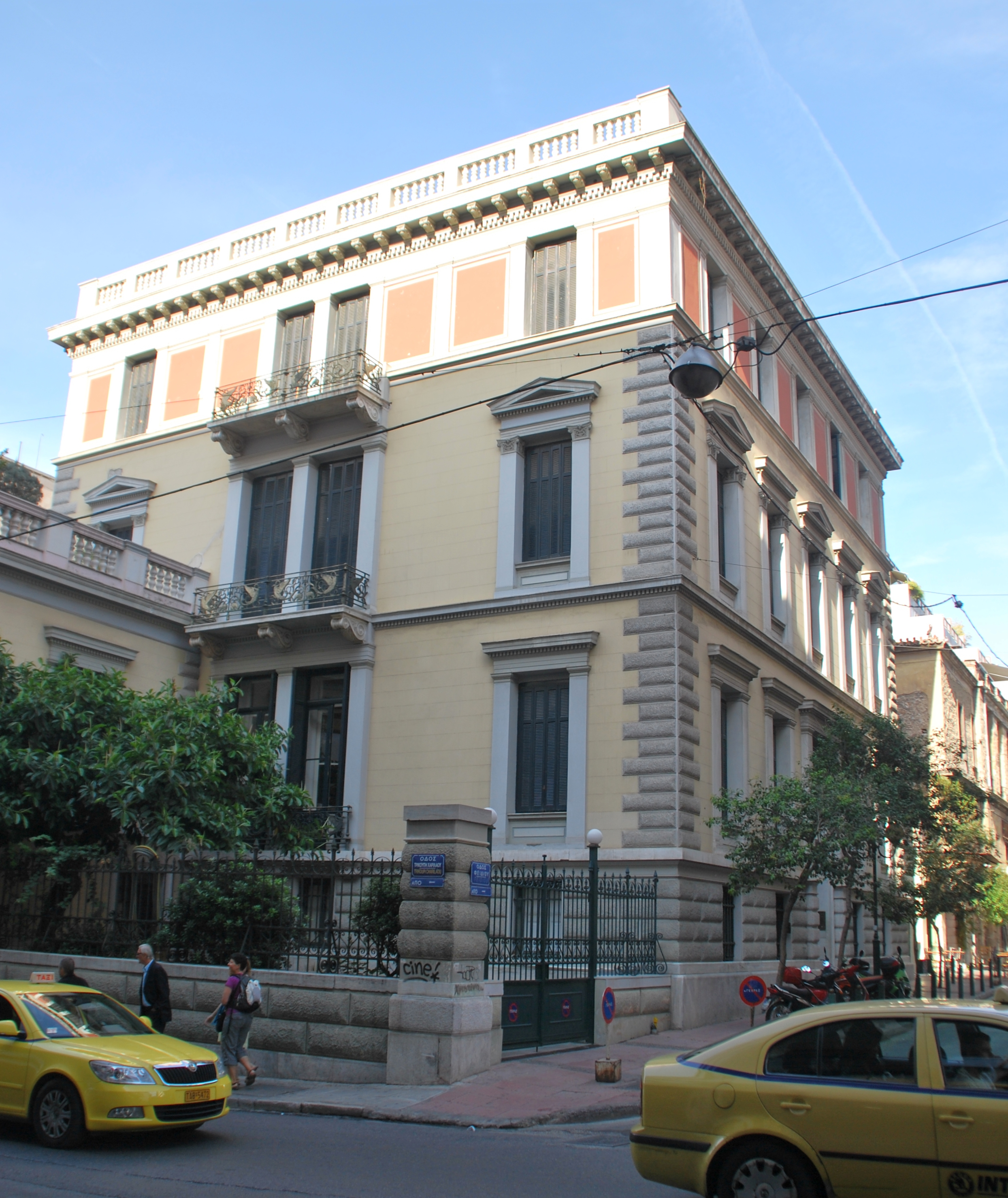
Building of the German Archaeological Institute at Athens, Fideiou 1 (built by Ernst Ziller)

The German Archaeological Institute at Athens (German: Deutsches Archäologisches Institut (DAI), Abteilung Athen; Greek: Γερμανικό Αρχαιολογικό Ινστιτούτο Αθηνών) is one of the 19 foreign archaeological institutes operating in Athens, Greece.

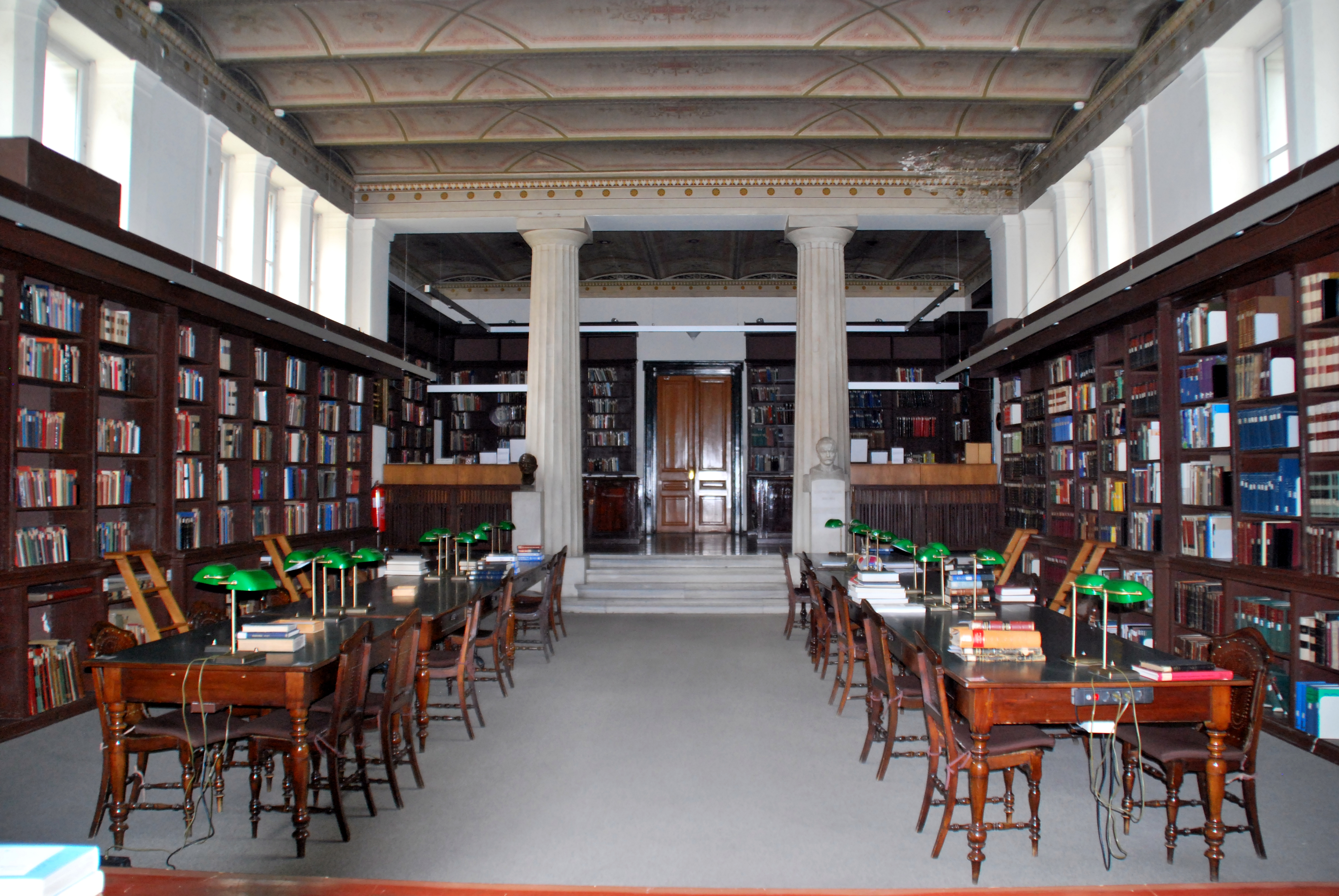
Reading room at the library

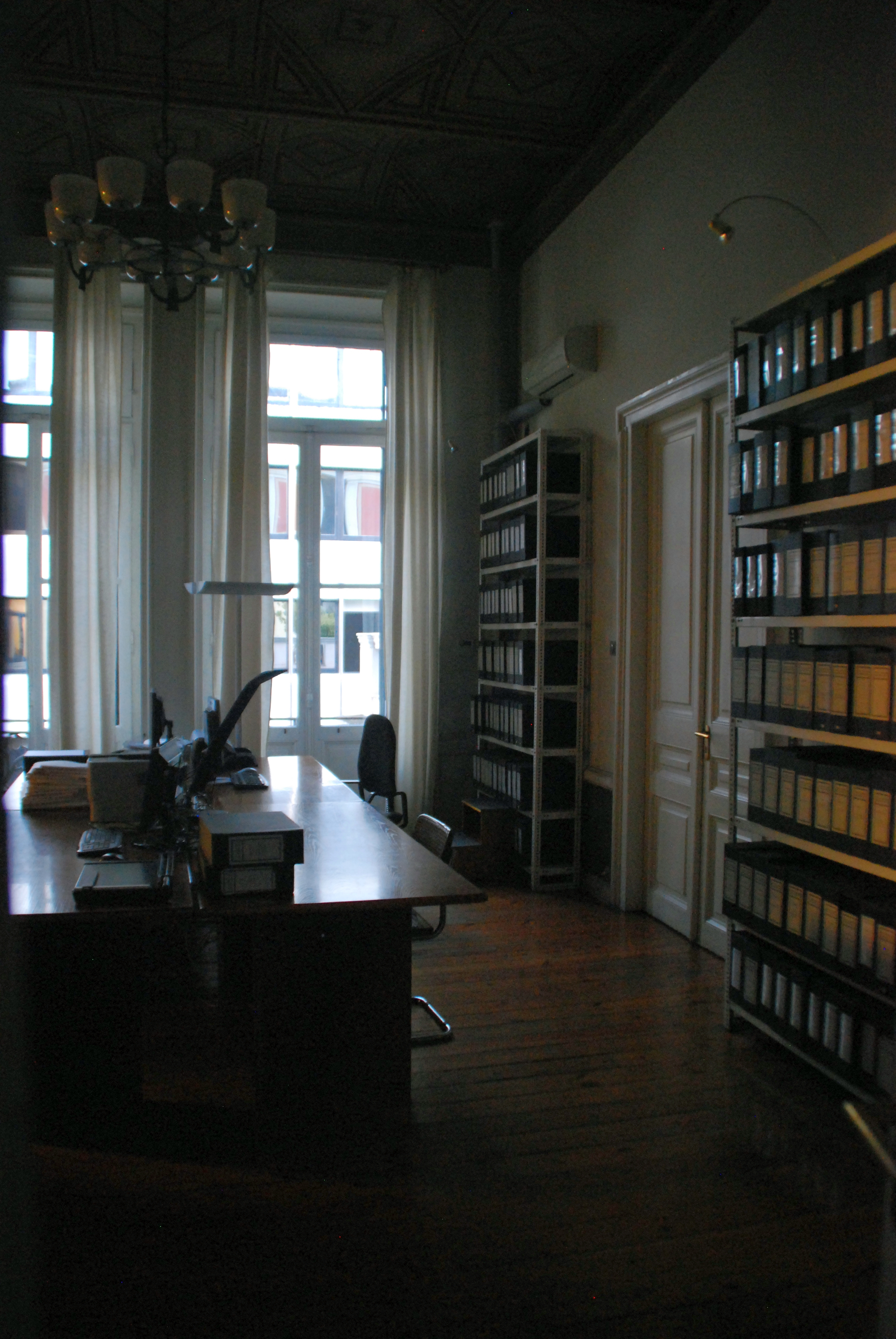
Photo library

== General information, history, facilities ==
The Athens department was the second department founded by the institute (after Rome) in 1874 and it is the second foreign institute in Athens (after the École Française d’Athènes). Part of the institute was established on May 17, 1872, and inaugurated on December 9, 1874. The construction of the building in which it is housed was funded by Heinrich Schliemann; the plans were made by Ernst Ziller and Wilhelm Dörpfeld.

Today, it is one of several specialised departments that make up the German Archaeological Institute. With an ongoing research programme, an 80,000-volume library and a large photographic archive, the German Archaeological Institute at Athens remains a major contributor to Greek archaeology. Along with other foreign archaeological schools in Athens, it is a member of a large scientific community and an indispensable part of the life of the antiquity archaeology scholars who work temporarily or permanently in Athens. The photo collection that resides in its library contains more than 140,000 negatives and is frequented by interested parties from all over the world.

The scientific journal "Mitteilungen des Deutschen Archäologische Institut, Athenische Abteilung" (English: Publications from the German Archaeological Institute, Athenian Department) has been published annually since 1876. The department has also published numerous scientific monographs, including reports on the department's excavations. Right from the start, it has not only carried out its own research and excavations, but also supports and promotes the work of other German and Greek scientists. Field research (excavations, topographical and architectural studies) has been carried out by the Athens Department since its foundation in almost all regions of Greece, until the Istanbul Department was founded in 1929 in western Asia Minor as well.

== Archaeological fieldwork ==
The German Archaeological Institute has been undertaking excavations at Olympia since 1875.

It has been involved in a multitude of excavations, such as Leukas and Ithaca (Ionian Islands), Orchomenos and Thebes (Boeotia), Menidi and Eleusis (Attica) and Amyklai (Laconia). Current activities include excavations at Kalapodi (Boeotia), Tiryns (Argolid), the Kerameikos (Athens), Ancient Olympia (Peloponnese) and the Heraion of Samos.

== Directors ==
- Otto Lüders 1872–1874
- Ulrich Köhler 1875–1886
- Eugen Petersen 1886-1887
- Wilhelm Dörpfeld 1887–1912
- Georg Karo 1912–1919 and 1930–1936
- Ernst Buschor 1921–1929
- Walter Wrede 1937–1944
- Emil Kunze 1951–1966
- Ulf Jantzen 1967–1974
- Helmut Kyrieleis 1975–1988
- Klaus Fittschen 1989–2001
- Wolf-Dietrich Niemeier 2001–2013
- Katja Sporn 2014–Today

== Bibliography ==
- E. Korka et al. (eds.): Foreign Archaeological Schools in Greece, 160 Years, Athens, Hellenic Ministry of Culture, date, p. 74-85.
