= Ulrich Köhler =

Ulrich Köhler may refer to:

- Ulrich Köhler (archaeologist) (1838-1903), German archaeologist
- Ulrich Köhler (director) (born 1969), German film director and screenwriter
