= Diar Nurbintoro =

Indonesian diplomat (born 1960)

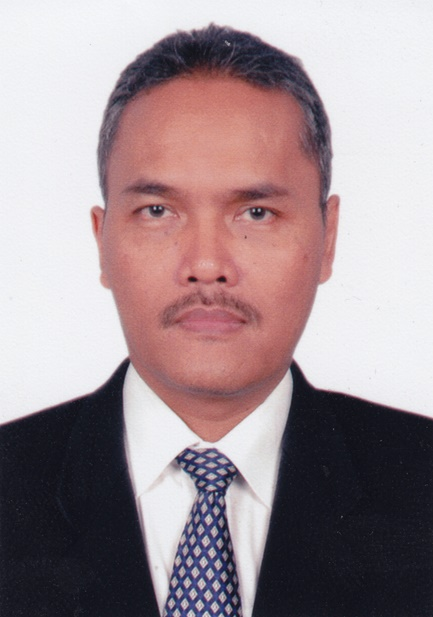

Ambassador of Indonesia to Romania and Moldova
- In office 24 December 2013 – November 2017
- President: Susilo Bambang Yudhoyono; Joko Widodo
- Preceded by: Marianna Sutadi
- Succeeded by: Muhammad Amhar Azeth

Personal details
- Born: September 15, 1960 (age 65) Cairo, Egypt
- Spouse: Cut Dina Faradia
- Education: University of Indonesia (S.H., M.H.)
- Occupation: Diplomat

Diar Nurbintoro (born 15 September 1960) is an Indonesian career diplomat who is currently serving as the director of the Non-Aligned Movement Centre for South-South Technical Cooperation. Previously, Diar was ambassador to Romania from 2013 to 2017 and the deputy head of foreign electorate task force for the 2019 Indonesian general election. A University of Indonesia graduate, Diar's portofolio includes international treaties, consular affairs, and diplomatic law.

== Early life and education ==
Born in Cairo on 15 September 1960, Diar received his bachelor's degree and master's degree in law from the University of Indonesia in 1985 and 2004, respectively.

== Diplomatic career ==
Diar joined the foreign service in March 1986. After completing basic diplomatic education in 1987, he became a staff member at the foreign ministry. By 1990, Diar assumed duties as acting head of section for America and Europe at the consular directorate, followed immediately by a tenure as the acting head of section for legal aid and social affairs from 1990 to 1992. His first diplomatic posting abroad was at the embassy in Port Moresby, Papua New Guinea where he served from 1992 to 1995 as the head of the sub-division for information and socio-cultural affairs with the rank of third secretary. Upon his return to Indonesia, he was appointed as the head of border section at the directorate of international treaties, a position he held until 1997. He completed his mid-level diplomatic education on that year.

From 7 July 1997 to 2001, Nurbintoro was posted to the embassy in Vienna, serving as the head of the sub-division for UN bodies with the rank of second secretary, and later, first secretary. Returning to the ministry's headquarters in 2002, he briefly served as deputy director (head of sub-directorate) for economic and financial treaties at the directorate of international treaties. From 2002 to 2004, he was reassigned as the deputy director for trade treaties, economic services, investment and finance, and environment at the directorate of economic and socio-cultural treaties. During his tenure, he completed his senior diplomatic education in 2003. He was then assigned to the embassy in Dar es Salaam from 2004 to 2008, where he became head of chancery with responsibilities in consular and political functions with the rank of minister counselor. Following this overseas assignment, he served as the head of general affairs at the secretariat of the directorate general of international law and treaties.

In 2010, Diar was appointed as the foreign ministry's legal director. Diar was then nominated as ambassador to Romania, with concurrent accreditation to Moldova, by President Susilo Bambang Yudhoyono on 3 September 2013. He passed assessment by the House of Representative's first commission on 18 September 2013 and was sworn in on 24 December 2013. Diar arrived in Bucharest in January 2014 and presented his credentials to the president of Romania Traian Băsescu on the 15th of that month. During the meeting, President Băsescu expressed his gratitude on the Indonesian government's willingness to extradite Nicolae Popa. He also presented his credentials to the president of Moldova Nicolae Timofti on 11 April 2014, where the president emphasized the need for an increase on the trade flow between the two nations and expressed his hope for Indonesia to provide Darmasiswa non-degree cultural scholarships for Moldovan students. Diar ended his term in November 2017.

From Romania, Diar returned to the technical cooperation directorate of the foreign ministry. During the preparations for the 2019 Indonesian general election, Diar served as the deputy head of foreign electorate task force. He briefly became the acting director of public diplomacy around late 2019. He later served as the executive secretary, and later director, of the Non-Aligned Movement Centre for South-South Technical Cooperation.

== Personal life ==
Diar is married to Cut Dina Faradia, the daughter of Teuku Mohammad Radhie, former chief of the national law development agency. Diar described himself as a movie addict, and would often transform the meeting room at his office into a makeshift movie theater during his tenure as legal director. He often requested meetings to be held near movie cinemas in order to accommodate his hobby.
