= Dilyara Alkayeva =

Russian judge (1949–2026)

- Диляра Алкаева

Judge of the Constitutional Court of the Republic of Tatarstan
- In office 29 June 2000 – 30 June 2010

Personal details
- Born: 8 September 1949
- Died: 9 November 2026 (aged 77)
- Profession: Jurist

Dilyara Akhmetovna Alkayeva (Russian: Диляра Ахметовна Алкаева; 8 September 1949 – 9 November 2026) was a Russian jurist who served as a judge of the Constitutional Court of the Republic of Tatarstan from 29 June 2000 to 30 June 2010.

Alkayeva died on 9 November 2026, at the age of 77.
