= Subramaniam Hariharan Iyer =

Indian human rights lawyer (died 2026)

- Died: 4 November 2026
- Occupation: Human rights lawyer

S.H. Iyer (died November 4, 2026) was an Indian human rights lawyer practicing at Gujarat High Court in Ahmedabad. He was associated with Human Rights Law Network and Jan Sangharsh Manch.

== Cases ==
Iyer represented the poor and the marginalized of the society in various cases over decades.

=== On behalf of hutment and slum dwellers ===
Iyer fought on behalf of hutment and slum dwellers on several occasions, leading either to rehabilitation of those evicted or to court granting stay against demolition drives.

=== On behalf of manual scavengers ===
After Gujarat government claimed that there was no manual scavenging in the state, Iyer took up the cause of those who had died in sewers. Subsequently, the Gujarat High Court passed an order that the civic chiefs will be liable for any future sewer deaths related to manual scavenging.

=== On behalf of glass industry workers ===
Iyer represented glass industry workers who suffered from silicosis as a result of their work. The workers and their families received a favorable judgement and were subsequently compensated for their suffering and loss.

=== On behalf of minorities ===
Iyer represented Muslims after the 2002 Gujarat riots in several high profile cases including the one involving Maya Kodnani.

=== Against state corruption ===
Iyer filed a PIL that resulted in Gujarat High Court directing the state government to properly investigate Panchmahal Public Distribution System scam of more than one hundred crore rupees. The scam had adversely affected the poor.

=== On behalf of fishermen and vegetable vendors ===
Iyer represented poor fishermen and vegetable vendors in litigation that helped them continue activities to earn their livelihoods.

== Death ==
Iyer died on 4 November 2026.

== Works ==
- Carving out foreign territory in India, by SH Iyer. In, Writings on Human Rights, Law and Society in India: A Combat Law Anthology. Selections from Combat Law, 2002-2010.
- Analysis of the structure and the practice of the legal machinery with reference to labour of SEZs, by SH Iyer. In, Labour File (Special Economic Zones: Their Impact on Labour).
