= Robert Marty =

French semiotician and mathematician (1936–2026)

- Marty in 2021
- Born: 22 May 1936; Perpignan, France
- Died: 9 November 2026 (aged 90)
- Education: University of Paris (DÉ); University of Perpignan Via Domitia (DÉ)
- Occupations: Mathematician; Semiotician

Robert Marty (French: [ʁobˈɛʁ mˈɑːti]; 22 May 1936 – 9 November 2026) was a French mathematician and semiotician.

Marty held the title of Doctorat d'État in mathematics from the University of Paris and philosophy from the University of Perpignan Via Domitia. He notably created a website dedicated to the works of Charles Sanders Peirce. He founded the group Semiocom in 1997 and was a member of the Centre international de recherche et d'études transdisciplinaires.

Marty died on 9 November 2026, at the age of 90.
