= Jordan Brunoli =

Australian bass guitarist (1995–2026)

- Born: 8 October 1995
- Died: 18 November 2026 (aged 31) Brisbane, Queensland, Australia
- Instrument: Bass guitar
- Member of: Bugs

Jordan Brunoli (8 October 1995 – 18 November 2026) was an Australian bass guitarist who played in the Brisbane-based rock band Bugs.

In 2025, Brunoli was diagnosed with stage-four metastatic colorectal cancer which soon spread to both his liver and lymph nodes. Before his diagnosis, Brunoli had shared his symptoms of severe abdominal pain and blood in his stool. He had stated that his initial concerns were dismissed across several appointments before a second doctor confirmed his condition. His treatment had included significant bowel removal surgery resulting in Brunoli living with a stoma, alongside chemotherapy.

Because of a genetic mutation, which had caused speedy tumour growth, both the surgery and chemotherapy treatments were unsuccessful in eradicating the disease. Brunoli was given a terminal diagnosis and a three- to four-month life expectancy in June 2026 and had transitioned into palliative care. His Bugs bandmates created a GoFundMe campaign that raised over $100,000 AUD to support his medical bills and care. Brunoli then used his platform to raise awareness in rising colorectal cancer rates in people under 30.

Brunoli died on 18 November 2026, aged 31.
