= Mitsuru Nagai =

Japanese pianist (1934–2026)

- 長井充
- Born: 1934; Osaka, Japan
- Died: 6 November 2026 (aged 91); Tokyo, Japan
- Education: Tokyo University of the Arts
- Occupations: Pianist; Academic teacher
- Organization: Musashino Academia Musicae

Mitsuru Nagai (Japanese: 長井充; 1934 – 6 November 2026) was a Japanese pianist. He was born into a musical family, and studied piano at the Tokyo University of the Arts. Nagai became a lecturer at Musashino Academia Musicae but resigned at age 59 to live in a Christian monastery. After ten years, he returned to Tokyo, and in 2007 he launched his YouTube channel, which rapidly gained popularity.

== Life and career ==
Mitsuru Nagai was born in Osaka in 1934, into a musical family. His grandfather on his father's side was a professor of music, and his grandfather on his mother's side, Kōji Nagai, founded the Osaka College of Music. At the age of three, he began playing the piano under the stewardship of his elder sister. His father also helped him, and taught Nagai the importance of perfect pitch and about musical temperament. Nagai began taking piano lessons in the second grade. These lessons were very strict, to the extent that he once exclaimed that he was quitting piano and threw his sheet music out of a streetcar window.

In 1947, while he was still in school, Nagai performed on his first radio broadcast, for the NHK in Osaka. During his high school at the Osaka College of Music, he played at rehearsals for the Japanese premiere of the ballet Giselle. After failing the entrance examination twice, Nagai was finally accepted into the piano department of the Tokyo University of the Arts. He practised so much during university that he developed severe tenosynovitis in his wrists, rendering him unable to play. A few days before his final examination, with his condition still not improved, he began to contemplate suicide. Despite visiting many hospitals, his condition did not improve. However, he managed to persevere during the examination—which he attributed to his faith—and passed successfully.

After graduating from university, he married Yoriko, but they struggled financially. Shortly after, Nagai took up a position as a lecturer at Musashino Academia Musicae and later became an associate professor. However, at the age of 59 he suddenly sold all of his assets and resigned his position, moving to a Christian monastery in the countryside to focus on his faith. After ten years Nagai and his wife moved back to Tokyo, in the Setagaya neighbourhood. He took up part-time work at a restaurant, and despite worrying about his lack of audience, he was inspired by a small child who was listening to his music.

In 2007, Nagai uploaded his first CD to YouTube, where it rapidly gained popularity. According to Town News, Nagai performed a duet with a young boy at his recital in 2019 after meeting him at a music store. In 2024, he retired from public performance and was living in a nursing home. Nagai died on 6 November 2026, at the age of 91.
