= Yan Zhen =

Chinese poet, painter and calligrapher (1930–2026)

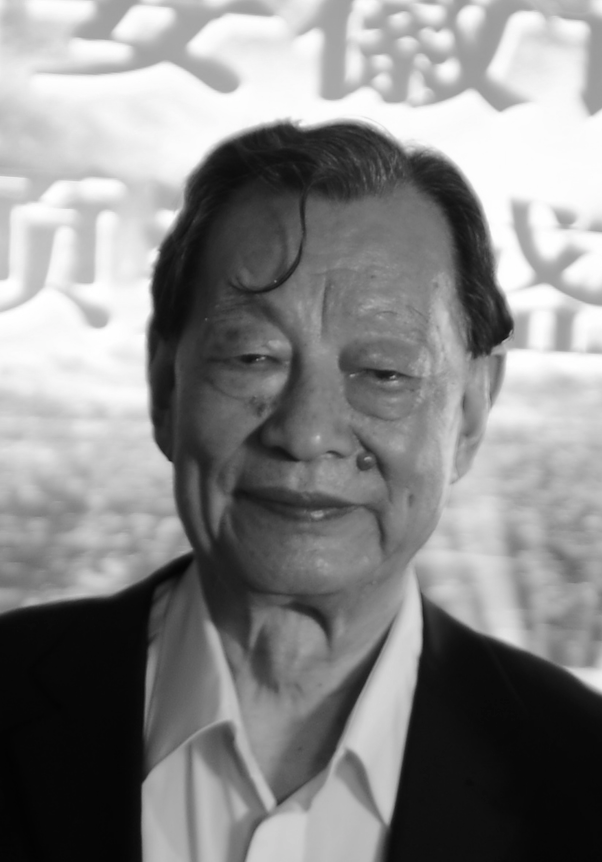
Yan in 2015.

Yan Zhen (Chinese: 严阵; pinyin: Yán Zhèn; Wade–Giles: Yen Chen; 1930 – 7 November 2026) was a Chinese poet, painter and calligrapher, best known in China for his writing. Yan published over 30 works of literature, including poetry, prose, and fiction. He was the editor of Jiaodong Daily (胶东日报), the Deputy Head of the Anhui Journal of Art and Literature (安徽省文艺创作研究室), vice editor in chief of Qing Ming Journal (清明), editor in chief of Poetry Journal (诗歌报), and a council member of the China Writers Association, or CWA (中国作协). Yan lived and worked in Beijing.

== Life and work ==
Yan was born in 1930 in Laiyang, Shandong Province, and spent most of his childhood in a small village with his family. His father was a primary school teacher. He left home at thirteen to join the revolutionary forces resisting the Japanese occupation.

During the Cultural Revolution (1966–1976), Yan was denounced by Red Guards. Both he and his wife were sent to separate parts of the countryside as a result. In 1985, Yan was among the first delegation of Chinese writers to go abroad after the end of the Cultural Revolution, and visited a number of American cities.

Yan died in Beijing on 7 November 2026, at the age of 96.

== Writing ==
Yan published his first volume of poetry at 24. In the early stage of his career he was one of the five "Great Young Poets", lauded as recorders of the social and cultural zeitgeist. He has been described as "one of the most promising poets in the early years of the founding of the People's Republic of China". In 1963–64, he was considered among the most successful young poets in the nation.

Notable works include Girl Beside the Huai River (淮河姑娘, 1955), Jiangnan Song (江南曲), Guqin Spring (琴泉), the essay collection Peony Courtyard (牡丹园记), the novel Barren Tracks (荒漠奇踪), and the novella Rose of the Southern Country (南国的玫瑰).

== Painting ==
Yan employed both watercolor and oil.

His work has been exhibited in China and internationally, including at the National Art Museum of China. His watercolor Beginning to Snow at Lotus Pond was sold in a 2007 Sotheby's auction in New York. He had his first show in the city in 2008, at the Fuller Building's Neuhoff Gallery.
