= Ninoslav Radovanović =

Serbian cardiac surgeon (1940–2026)

- Нинослав Радовановић
- Born: 6 May 1940; Niš, Kingdom of Yugoslavia
- Died: 10 November 2026 (aged 86); Novi Sad, Vojvodina, Serbia
- Occupation: Cardiac surgeon

Ninoslav Radovanović (Serbian Cyrillic: Нинослав Радовановић; 6 May 1940 – 10 November 2026) was a Serbian cardiac surgeon. He was born in Niš, graduated from the University of Belgrade School of Medicine, and was a member of the Serbian Academy of Sciences and Arts.

Radovanović died on 10 November 2026, at the age of 86.
