= Blanche Le Bris =

French bookseller and Holocaust survivor (1920–2026)

- Born: Blyma Menner; 25 September 1920; Poland
- Died: 7 November 2026 (aged 106); Brest, France
- Occupation: Bookseller

Blanche Le Bris (née Blyma Menner; 25 September 1920 – 7 November 2026) was a French bookseller and Holocaust survivor.

== Biography ==
Born in Poland on 25 September 1920, Le Bris was the daughter of Polish Jews Adolf and Rosa Menner. Facing anti-Semitism and the pogroms in Poland, the family moved to France in 1922, settling in Brest. There her parents opened a leatherworks shop and French authorities required her to take a French name, therefore she became known as Blanche. Her father was later reported to have changed his name from Yankel Wallach in order to avoid conscription into the Polish Armed Forces.

In 1941, she married Pierre Le Bris in Quimper, converting to Catholicism one week before the Vichy regime banned inter-faith marriages. On the night of 9 October 1942, her parents were arrested by German authorities, which she narrowly escaped. Her parents were deported to Auschwitz, from where they never returned. Pierre and Blanche Le Bris then entrusted the care of their daughter, Jacqueline, to a couple living in Quimper and laid low in Paris until the Liberation.

After the war, Le Bris and her husband endured difficult times back in Brest, struggling to find work while bearing witness to the explosion of the Ocean Liberty. They eventually set up a successful bookstore called Librairie de la Cité. After her husband passed away in 2012, she finally agreed to share her testimony, notably agreeing to the publishing of her biography titled Blanche, mémoires d'une Brestoise d'adoption, which was written by her granddaughter.

Le Bris died in Brest on 7 November 2026, at the age of 106.
