= Carlo Molinari =

French motorcycle racer and football executive (1933–2026)

President of FC Metz
- In office 1 July 1983 – 9 June 2009
- Preceded by: Aimé Dumartin
- Succeeded by: Bernard Serin
- In office 21 June 1967 – 1978
- Succeeded by: Aimé Dumartin

Personal details
- Born: Charles Molinari; 28 February 1933 Villerupt, France
- Died: 4 November 2026 (aged 93)
- Occupation: Motorcycle racer Sporting director

Charles "Carlo" Molinari (French: [ʃaʁl kaʁlo molinaʁi]; 28 February 1933 – 4 November 2026) was a French motorcycle racer and football executive.

Molinari was champion of the French Elite Motocross Championship three times between 1952 and 1955 in the 500 cc category. He served as president of the football club FC Metz from 1967 to 1978 and again from 1983 to 2009.

Molinari died on 4 November 2026, at the age of 93.
