= Georges Khodr =

Lebanese Orthodox bishop and theologian (1923–2026)

- Metropolitan of Byblos and Botrys
- Native name: جورج خضر
- Church: Greek Orthodox Patriarchate of Antioch
- Archdiocese: Byblos and Botrys (Mount Lebanon)
- In office: 1970–2018
- Successor: Silouan Moussi

Orders
- Ordination: 19 December 1954
- Consecration: 15 February 1970

Personal details
- Born: 6 July 1923 Tripoli, Lebanon
- Died: 22 November 2026 (aged 103)
- Education: Saint Joseph University; St. Sergius Orthodox Theological Institute

Georges Khodr (Arabic: جورج خضر; 6 July 1923 – 22 November 2026), also known as George Khodr, was a Lebanese Eastern Orthodox bishop, theologian and writer. He served as metropolitan of Byblos and Botrys (Mount Lebanon) in the Greek Orthodox Patriarchate of Antioch from 1970 to 2018.

A co-founder of the Orthodox Youth Movement in 1942, Khodr was associated with the renewal of Orthodox church life in Lebanon and Syria. His theological writings addressed ecumenism, relations between Christianity and other religions, and the place of Christians in Middle Eastern societies. He was also a long-standing columnist for the Lebanese newspaper An-Nahar.

== Early life and education ==
Khodr was born in Tripoli on 6 July 1923. He attended French-language schools run by the De La Salle Brothers in Tripoli and Beirut, and subsequently studied law at Saint Joseph University in Beirut. He graduated in 1944 and practised law before pursuing theological studies.

In 1942, while a law student, he helped establish the Orthodox Youth Movement with other university students. The movement encouraged Bible study, parish participation, monastic renewal and social work.

He went to Paris in 1947 to study at the St. Sergius Orthodox Theological Institute, graduating in 1952. His teachers included Alexander Schmemann, Cyprian Kern and Alexis Kniazeff. His studies introduced him to Russian émigré Orthodox theology and combined attention to the Church Fathers with historical-critical scholarship.

== Church career ==
Khodr was ordained a priest on 19 December 1954 and served the parish of El Mina, the port of Tripoli, from 1955 to 1970. On 15 February 1970 he was consecrated metropolitan of Byblos, Botrys and Mount Lebanon.

His episcopal work included clergy training, support for monasteries and social assistance. He established a medical and social care centre and an Orthodox mutual-aid fund, and oversaw the construction or restoration of more than fifty churches. He also taught Arab culture at the Lebanese University and pastoral theology and Islamic studies at the St John of Damascus Institute of Theology in Balamand.

Khodr retired on 3 March 2018 for health reasons. On 27 April, the Antiochian synod transferred Silouan Moussi from the metropolitan see of Buenos Aires and Argentina to succeed him.

He died on 22 November 2026, aged 103.

== Ecumenical and interreligious work ==
Khodr participated in the first assembly of the World Council of Churches in Amsterdam in 1948, where he became a member of its youth commission. He later chaired the theological commission of the Middle East Council of Churches from 1976 to 1982, and served on the Joint International Commission for Theological Dialogue Between the Catholic Church and the Orthodox Church from 1980 to 2007.

In a study of his ecumenical thought, theologian Sylvie Avakian described his understanding of Christian unity as a model of unity in diversity, relating it to the theological differences and historical divisions between Eastern and Western Christianity.

On 20–22 May 1996, Khodr held discussions with the Lebanese Shia scholar Mahmoud Ayoub at the University of Balamand. Their exchanges were published in French in 2018 as Conversations orientales sur l'islam et le christianisme, with translation, annotations and presentation prepared by Maurice Borrmans.

== Theology and social thought ==
=== Christianity and other religions ===
Khodr's theology drew on Eastern Christian patristic and mystical traditions. Avakian identifies the image of God in humanity, the activity of the Holy Spirit, and apophatic theology—the understanding that human concepts cannot exhaust the divine mystery—as foundations of his approach to religious difference.

At a meeting of the World Council of Churches' central committee in Addis Ababa in 1971, he delivered an address entitled "Christianity in a Pluralistic World: The Economy of the Holy Spirit". He argued that Christ and the Holy Spirit were active beyond the visible boundaries of the Church, and that Christians could discern Christ's presence in other religious traditions. Theologian Paul Ladouceur classifies this approach as inclusivism: it allowed for the salvation of non-Christians while maintaining the universal significance of Christ.

The address drew criticism from the Orthodox monk Seraphim Rose, who challenged Khodr's account of Christ's presence in other religions and what he understood as a separation of the activity of the Holy Spirit from that of Christ. Ladouceur argues that Rose misrepresented Khodr by portraying the Spirit as wholly independent of Christ, while identifying an unresolved theological question about their activity beyond the Church.

=== Religion and society ===
According to theologian Najib George Awad, Khodr understood Arabic-speaking Christians and Muslims as participants in a shared historical and cultural world. He linked Christian–Muslim dialogue to recognition of this shared inheritance and to discussion of their common monotheistic beliefs.

Avakian describes his support for civil government transcending sectarian affiliation and his distinction between personal religious faith and the legal institution of the state.

Scholar Pamela Chrabieh describes Khodr's advocacy of religious freedom, equal citizenship and dialogue between partners willing to question themselves. She also notes his criticism of secularization and of French republican models of secularism. In her comparison of Khodr and Ayoub, she questions whether their vision of a society grounded in Christian–Muslim religious consensus adequately accommodated atheists, agnostics and people outside established religious communities.

Avakian notes that Khodr distinguished Judaism from Zionism. He considered religious dialogue with Jews possible, but opposed Zionism and normalization with Israel, and regarded armed resistance to Israel as permissible.

== Writing ==
Khodr edited the Orthodox Youth Movement's magazine An-Nour from 1948 to 1970. His articles, sermons and lectures were collected in books published in Arabic, and he contributed theological and social commentary to An-Nahar.

His autobiographical and spiritual work The Ways of Childhood was first published in Arabic in 1979. It appeared in French as Et si je disais les chemins de l'enfance in 1997, translated by Raymond and Georges Rizk, and in English from St Vladimir's Seminary Press in 2016. A further collection of his Arabic writings, edited by Olga Lossky, was published in French in 2025 as Chrétien dans une société plurielle: Le témoignage d'un évêque arabe.

== Honours ==
Khodr received honorary doctorates from St. Vladimir's Orthodox Theological Seminary in 1968, the Protestant Faculty of Theology in Paris in 1988, and the St Sergius Orthodox Theological Institute in 2007.

On 31 January 2017, President Michel Aoun awarded him the Grand Cordon of the National Order of the Cedar.

== Selected publications ==
- Khodr, Georges (1971). "Christianity in a Pluralistic World: The Economy of the Holy Spirit". The Ecumenical Review. 23 (2): 118–128. doi:10.1111/j.1758-6623.1971.tb01114.x.
- Khodr, Georges (2001). L'appel de l'Esprit: Église et société (in French). Éditions du Cerf. ISBN 978-2-204-06760-7.
- Khodr, Georges (2016). The Ways of Childhood. St Vladimir's Seminary Press. ISBN 978-0-88141-538-4.
- Ayyûb, Mahmûd; Khodr, Georges (2018). Conversations orientales sur l'islam et le christianisme: Trois débats à l'université orthodoxe de Balamand (Liban) (in French). Chemins de Dialogue.
- Khodr, Georges (2025). Lossky, Olga (ed.). Chrétien dans une société plurielle: Le témoignage d'un évêque arabe (in French). Éditions du Cerf. ISBN 978-2-204-16487-0.
