= Mike Rowland (wheelwright) =

English craftsman (1937–2026)

Michael John Rowland (4 July 1937 – 9 November 2026) was an English wheelwright and coachbuilder located in Colyton, Devon.

== Life and career ==
Michael John Rowland was born in Payhembury, Devon, on 4 July 1937. The business was established in 1964. Rowland and his son Greg ran their own family-owned business together. They were awarded the Royal Warrant of Appointment in January 2005 by Queen Elizabeth II as her wheelwrights and coachbuilders. All work is still done by hand in the traditional way; that is the same for hundreds of years. For the 2011 Wedding of Prince William and Catherine Middleton, Rowland was responsible for the maintenance of the wheels of the royal and state chariots and carriages.

Rowland also built wheels for canons and took other orders in for the construction or maintenance of carriages and coaches. Carriages are built by eye. They also supplied wheels for the Hollywood blockbuster Gladiator.

Rowland died on 9 November 2026, aged 89.
