= Vinny Chase =

American rapper and songwriter (1986–2026)

- Born: Lanelle M. Hector; October 30, 1986; New York City, U.S.
- Died: November 16, 2026 (aged 40)
- Genre: Hip hop
- Occupations: Rapper; songwriter
- Years active: 2009–2026
- Label: Cheers Club

Lanelle M. Hector (October 30, 1986 – November 16, 2026), better known by his stage name, Vinny Cha$e, was an American rapper and songwriter from the Harlem section of Manhattan, New York. He was signed to Cheers Club, his own record label, and Epic Records/Sony Music. Vinny was a member of Cheers Club, a creative collective that specializes in music, fashion, and film.

== Life and career ==
Vinny Cha$e received his start in the music industry by directing videos for popular artists such as Lil Wayne, Chris Brown, Cam'ron and Juelz Santana. In 2011, he released his debut mixtape, "The Plaza". From 2011, Cha$e released over five mixtapes with some mixtapes boasting features from prominent and high name acts.

He worked on a clothing line called "Cheers Club" along with partners Kid Art and Cartier.

Cha$e died in a traffic collision on November 16, 2026, at the age of 40.

== Discography ==
=== Mixtapes ===
- The Plaza (2011, Cheers Club Music)
- Double Cup City (2012, Cheers Club Music)
- Survival Of The Swag (2012, Cheers Club Music)
- King's Landing (2013, Cheers Club Music)
- Golden Army (2013, Cheers Club Music)
- Express 2 Harlem (2016, Cheers Club Music)
