= Allen Ballard =

American author (1930–2026)

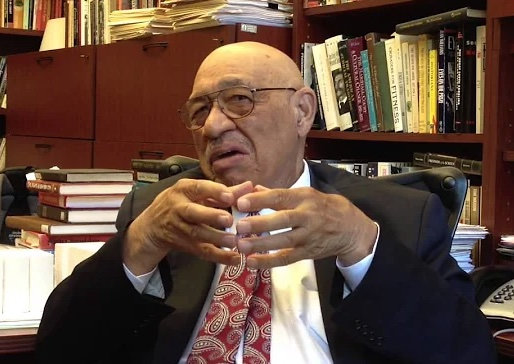
Allen B. Ballard at SUNY Albany on July 9, 2014

Allen Butler Ballard Jr. (November 1, 1930 – November 5, 2026) was an American writer of both fiction and non-fiction books, a government professor at the City College of New York (1961–1986) and then a history professor at the University at Albany, SUNY, where he was Professor Emeritus and A Collins Fellow.

A civil rights pioneer throughout his academic career, Ballard was one of the first African American students at Kenyon College and he was the first African American Assistant Dean (1966–1967) and Associate Dean (1967–1969) at the City College of New York and the first African American Associate Dean at the City University of New York (1969–1974).

== Early life ==
Born on November 1, 1930, in Philadelphia, to Olive Robinson Ballard and Allen B. Ballard, Ballard was raised in Philadelphia. He graduated from Central High School and became one of the first two African American students (with Stanley Jackson) at Kenyon College in 1948. In 1973, Ballard wrote of his struggle to integrate Kenyon:

"We were, in fact, forced to suppress our natural inner selves.... For eighteen hours a day our manners, speech, style, and walking were on trial before white America....Social life revolved around fraternities from which we were automatically excluded. The cumulative toll, both physically and academically, was heavy."

After graduating from Kenyon in 1952 and then serving in the Army, including a tour at Supreme Allied Headquarters in Paris, Ballard enrolled in Harvard University's Soviet Union Regional Studies Program in 1955 as only its second Black student. In 1961, Ballard completed his doctoral dissertation and earned his Ph.D.

== Leading the SEEK program ==
Ballard, together with Psychologist Leslie Berger, was a principal founder of the City University SEEK Program, an affirmative action admissions, teaching, and student support program that launched at City College as a pilot program in 1965 with 113 students. In July 1966, State Assembly members Percy Sutton and Shirley Chisholm led the fight to secure SEEK one million dollars in New York State funding to expand across the City University of New York's four-year colleges. In October 1966, Ballard was appointed to be the first African American Assistant Dean at City College. Although SEEK (Search for Education, Elevation, and Knowledge) was officially designated as an anti-poverty program, it quickly ended racial exclusion in CUNY admissions. In the Fall of 1967, 94% of all SEEK students were Black or Puerto-Rican. By the Fall of 1968, SEEK had grown to support over active 1800 students across CUNY, with an annual budget of $3.5 million. Close to 40% of the 1965–1967 City College SEEK students graduated by 1972.

== Death ==
Ballard died on November 5, 2026, at the age of 96.

== Selected bibliography ==
- The Education of Black Folk: The Afro-American Struggle For Knowledge in White America. (non-fiction) (1973) New York: Harper & Row, 1973.
- One More Day’s Journey: The Story of a Family and a People. (nonfiction), McGraw, 1984.
- Where I’m Bound. (novel), Simon & Schuster, 2000.
- Breaching Jericho's Walls: A Twentieth Century African American Life. (non-fiction) Albany: SUNY, 2011.
