= Jah Division =

Russian reggae band

- Origin: Moscow, Russia
- Genre: Reggae
- Years active: 1991–2026
- Website: http://www.jahdivision.com/

Jah Division (Russian: Джа Диви́жн) is a Russian reggae band. It is one of the oldest reggae bands in Russia, formed in early 1990s in Moscow.

== History ==
Herbert Morales (January 30, 1962 – November 20, 2026), also known as Gera Morales, was the founder of Jah Division. He is son of a Cuban revolutionary, Leopoldo Morales, an associate of Che Guevara.

In Russia and CIS, band has cult status and well known among reggae fans. But fame goes beyond Rastafarian subculture. The first TV broadcast of Jah Division happened in 1992 at one of central TV channels. Since then, Morales was repeatedly invited by different broadcasts alone or with other musicians of band. He constantly gave interviews for newspapers and magazines.

Herbert Morales collaborated with reggae band Dubska from Poland, recorded the common LP album ДабскаДивижн and performed on the different Poland fests. In summer 2011 Jah Division demonstrated new sound of band at Perm's White Night festival.

== Discography ==
- 1992 – Индюки златоглавые (Indyuki zlatoglavye / Golden-headed turkeys) (live) [MC]
- 1994 – Концерт в ДК Горбунова (Concert at the Gorbunov recreation center) (live) [MC]
- 1995 – Cubana [MC]
- 2000 – Jah Division
- 2001 – Live in Forpost club
- 2001 – Ten years of Jah division (live in Forpost club) [MC]
- 2002 – Live in Warsaw
- 2002 – The single
- 2002 – Пассионарии Джа. День независимости (Passionarii Jah. Den nezavisimosti / Passionaries of Jah. Independence day)
- 2003 – Recycled
- 2003 – Пассионарии Джа (live in Forpost club) (Passionarii Jah / Passionaries of Jah)
- 2004 – The best
- 2004 – День рождения (live) (Den rojdenya / Birthday)
- 2005 – Cubana
- 2006 – Закат (Zakat / Sunset)
- 2007 – All music
- 2007 – Эссенция (Essenciya/ Essence)
- 2009 – Гений пламенных речей (Geniy plmennyh rechey / Genius of fiery speeches) (Maxi-Single)
- 2012 – Поднимайте сердца (Podnimayte serdca / Raise your hearts) (feat. NetSlov) (Maxi-Single)

== Literature ==
- Alexeev A.A. - Who is who in Russian rock
