= Don O'Hara =

Australian rules footballer (1933–2026)

Personal information
- Full name: Donald Francis O'Hara
- Born: 15 February 1933
- Died: 1 November 2026 (aged 93)
- Original team: North Geelong
- Height: 178 cm (5 ft 10 in)
- Weight: 78 kg (172 lb)

Playing career^{1}
Years	Club	Games (Goals)
1954	Geelong	3 (0)
- ^{1} Playing statistics correct to the end of 1954.

Donald Francis O'Hara (15 February 1933 – 1 November 2026) was an Australian rules footballer who played with Geelong in the Victorian Football League (VFL).

Recruited from local club North Geelong, Don played for Geelong from 1952 to 1955, playing 49 Reserves matches and 3 Senior matches with the Cats under senior coach Reg Hickey, and playing captain coaches of the Reserves during that era in Lindsay White (1952), Leo O'Halloran (1952) and Doug Davies (1953-1955).

O'Hara died on 1 November 2026, at the age of 93.
