= Annette Chépy-Léger =

French politician (1953–2026)

Deputy of the French National Assembly for Marne's 4th constituency
- In office 2 July 1981 – 4 December 1981
- Preceded by: Jean Bernard
- Succeeded by: Bruno Bourg-Broc

Personal details
- Born: Annette Jeanne Léger; 4 October 1953 Châlons-sur-Marne, France
- Died: 11 November 2026 (aged 73)
- Party: PS
- Occupation: Tax agent

Annette Jean Chépy-Léger (French: [anˈɛt ʒˈɑ̃ ʃˈe͡ɪpi-leʒˈe]; 4 October 1953 – 11 November 2026) was a French politician of the Socialist Party.

Chépy-Léger began working as a tax agent for the Direction générale des Finances publiques in 1972. She was elected to the National Assembly in 1981, the youngest deputy at the age of 27. However, her victory was annulled by the Constitutional Council for falsely claiming the support of the Mouvement des démocrates, which had not given voting instructions after its candidate was eliminated in the first round. In a special election held in January 1982, she was defeated by Rally for the Republic candidate Bruno Bourg-Broc in the second round. She was also a substitute member of the Parliamentary Assembly of the Council of Europe from 30 September 1981 to 29 January 1982.

Chépy-Léger died on 11 November 2026, at the age of 73.
