= Ted Smale =

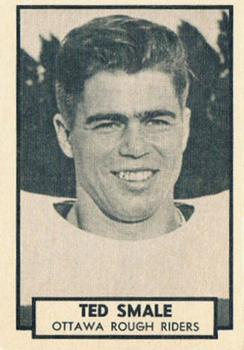

Profile
- Positions: Defensive end, Tight end

Personal information
- Born: June 23, 1932; Toronto, Ontario, Canada
- Died: November 15, 2026 (aged 94); Ottawa, Ontario, Canada
- Listed height: 6 ft 2 in (1.88 m)
- Listed weight: 218 lb (99 kg)

Career information
- University: University of Toronto

Career history
- 1956–1962: Ottawa Rough Riders

Awards and highlights
- Grey Cup champion (1960)

Charles Frederick "Ted" Smale (June 23, 1932 – November 15, 2026) was a defensive end and tight end in the Canadian Football League with the Ottawa Rough Riders from 1956 to 1962.

After playing at the University of Toronto, Ted Smale joined the Ottawa Rough Riders in 1956, staying on until 1962, mostly as a defensive end for the first three years. In 1959, head coach Frank Clair asked him to switch to tight end. Bob Simpson was the split end, and so the Rough Riders used two Canadian ends until 1962 when Smale retired. Smale's best year as a receiver was by far 1959 (24 catches, 490 yards, 20.4 yards per catch, 2 touchdowns). In his 7-year career, he played all regular season games 5 times. He was part of the 48th Grey Cup winning team in 1960. It was during the 1960 season that Smale severed his medial collateral ligament in his right leg, requiring surgery and 6 weeks of hospitalization. During 1960 until the end of his career, Smale ran as backup tight end to Bill Sowalski.

Smale died on November 15, 2026, at age 94.
