= Bugs (band) =

Australian rock band from Brisbane

- Origin: Brisbane, Australia
- Genres: Indie rock; alternative rock; pop rock
- Years active: 2014–2026

Bugs are an Australian three-piece rock band from Brisbane, Queensland, which formed in 2014. In February 2022, the band announced the release of their third studio album, Cooties.

A fundraiser for the band's bassist, Jordan Brunoli, was conducted on 4 October 2025 at The Tivoli in Brisbane as a fundraising event, as he had been diagnosed with stage 4 colorectal cancer. Brunoli died from cancer on 18 November 2026.

== Discography ==
=== Studio albums ===
List of studio albums, with release date, label, and selected chart positions shown
Title	Album details	Peak chart positions
Title	Album details	AUS Vinyl
Growing Up	Released: 16 May 2016; Label: Bugs; Format: LP, digital download, streaming	—
Self Help	Released: 20 September 2019; Label: Bugs; Format: LP, digital download, streaming	—
Cooties	Released: 25 March 2022; Label: Bugs, Community Music; Format: LP, digital download, streaming	4
Head Noise	Released: 28 August 2026; Label: Bugs; Format: digital download, streaming	—

=== Extended plays ===
List of EPs, with release date
Title	Details
Bored	Released: June 2014; Label: Bugs; Format: Digital download, streaming
Cosmic Dolphin	Released: September 2014; Label: Bugs; Format: Digital download, streaming
In My Room	Released: December 2014; Label: Bugs; Format: Digital download, streaming
Too Fast for Satan	Released: June 2015; Label: Bugs; Format: Digital download, streaming
Social Slump	Released: 13 April 2018; Label: Bugs; Format: Digital download, streaming

== Awards and nominations ==
=== J Awards ===
The J Awards are an annual series of Australian music awards that were established by the Australian Broadcasting Corporation's youth-focused radio station Triple J. They commenced in 2005.

Year	Nominee / work	Award	Result	Ref.
2026	Head Noise	Australian Album of the Year	Nominated	
