= Alla Yeryomenko =

Russian politician (1941–2026)

- Алла Ерёменко

Member of the State Council of the Udmurt Republic from the 37th district
- In office 18 April 1995 – 20 April 1999

Personal details
- Born: 13 October 1941 Krasnodar Krai, Russian SFSR, USSR
- Died: 20 November 2026 (aged 85) Izhevsk, Udmurtia, Russia
- Education: Udmurt State University
- Profession: Politician, educator

Alla Vasilyevna Yeryomenko (Russian: Алла Васильевна Ерёменко; 13 October 1941 – 20 November 2026) was a Russian educator and politician who was a member of the State Council of the Udmurt Republic from 1995 to 1999.

Yeryomenko died in Izhevsk on 20 November 2026, at the age of 85.
