= Françoise Woimant =

French librarian and art historian (1929–2026)

- Woimant in 2018
- Born: Françoise Adam; 29 October 1929; Paris, France
- Died: 7 November 2026 (aged 97)
- Education: École Nationale des Chartes
- Occupations: Librarian; Art historian

Françoise Woimant (née Adam; French: [fʁɑ̃swˈaz wˈɔ͡ɪmənt]; 29 October 1929 – 7 November 2026) was a French librarian and art historian.

A graduate of the École Nationale des Chartes, she received her archivist-paleographer diploma in 1955 with a thesis titled Le Commerce français en Espagne pendant l’ambassade de Vauréal de 1741 à 1746. She became chief curator of the Bibliothèque de l'École des Chartes in 1982 and curator general in 1993. In 1994, she was named a Commander of the Ordre des Arts et des Lettres.

Woimant died on 7 November 2026, at the age of 97.

== Books ==
- De Bonnard à Baselitz, estampes et livres d'artistes (with Marie-Cécile Miessner, Anne Mœglin Delcroix, and prefaced by Emmanuel Le Roy Ladurie, 1992)
