= Engin Deniz Akarlı =

Turkish-American historian (1945–2026)

Engin Deniz Akarlı (September 26, 1945 – November 8, 2026) was a Turkish-American historian who specialized in Ottoman and Middle Eastern history. He was Joukowsky Family Distinguished Professor Emeritus of Modern Middle East History at Brown University. His research focused on Ottoman Lebanon, Syria, legal history, and governance. Akarlı was the recipient of Presidential Culture and Arts Grand Awards awarded by Presidency of Turkey.

== Early life and education ==
Akarlı was born in Eskişehir, Turkey, on September 26, 1945. He earned a BA in Public Administration and Economics from Robert College in 1968. Akarlı completed an MA in History at the University of Wisconsin–Madison in 1972. He earned an MA and a Ph.D. in Near Eastern History from Princeton University in 1973 and 1976, respectively.

== Academic career ==
Akarlı began his academic career at Boğaziçi University from 1976 to 1983, where he played a formative role in developing the History Department. He later taught at Yarmouk University in Jordan from 1983 to 1989 and at Washington University in St. Louis from 1989 to 1996. In 1996, he joined Brown University, where he was appointed Joukowsky Family Distinguished Professor of Modern Middle East History and taught until 2012. After retiring from Brown, he served at İstanbul Şehir University from 2011 to 2020, first as a Senior Fulbright Fellow and later as Professor of History and Islamic Studies.

He held research fellowships at the Wissenschaftskolleg zu Berlin, the Institute for Advanced Study in Princeton, and the Islamic Legal Studies Program at Harvard Law School.

== Scholarship ==
Akarlı’s early work focused on Ottoman demographic, fiscal, and political history, as well as world and Middle Eastern economic history. His later scholarship examined transformations in Ottoman governance, law, and social order and explored the history of geographical Syria, with an emphasis on Lebanon and Jordan under Ottoman rule.

His first significant publication was a pioneering work on Political Participation in Turkey (1975), which he edited with Gabriel Ben-Dor. His Belgelerle Tanzimat: Âli ve Fuad Paşaların Siyasi Vasiyetnameleri (1978) was a documentary work that offered insight into elite decision-making, fiscal constraints, and institutional continuity during the Tanzimat era.

Akarlı’s research also focuses on Ottoman Lebanon. His Long Peace: Ottoman Lebanon, 1861–1920 (1993) argues that the special regime in Mount Lebanon evolved into a durable system of governance led by local elites, with input from imperial authority and international oversight. It received the Missouri Historical Society’s Best History Book Prize.

His research on the reign of Abdülhamid II introduced new sources and interpretations into the historiography of the period, examining its political and social complexities. He received Turkey’s Presidential Grand Award in Culture and Arts in 2014.

== Death ==
Akarlı died on November 8, 2026, at the age of 81. He was buried at Karacaahmet Cemetery in Istanbul.
