= Jan Władysław Woś =

Polish historian and essayist (1939–2026)

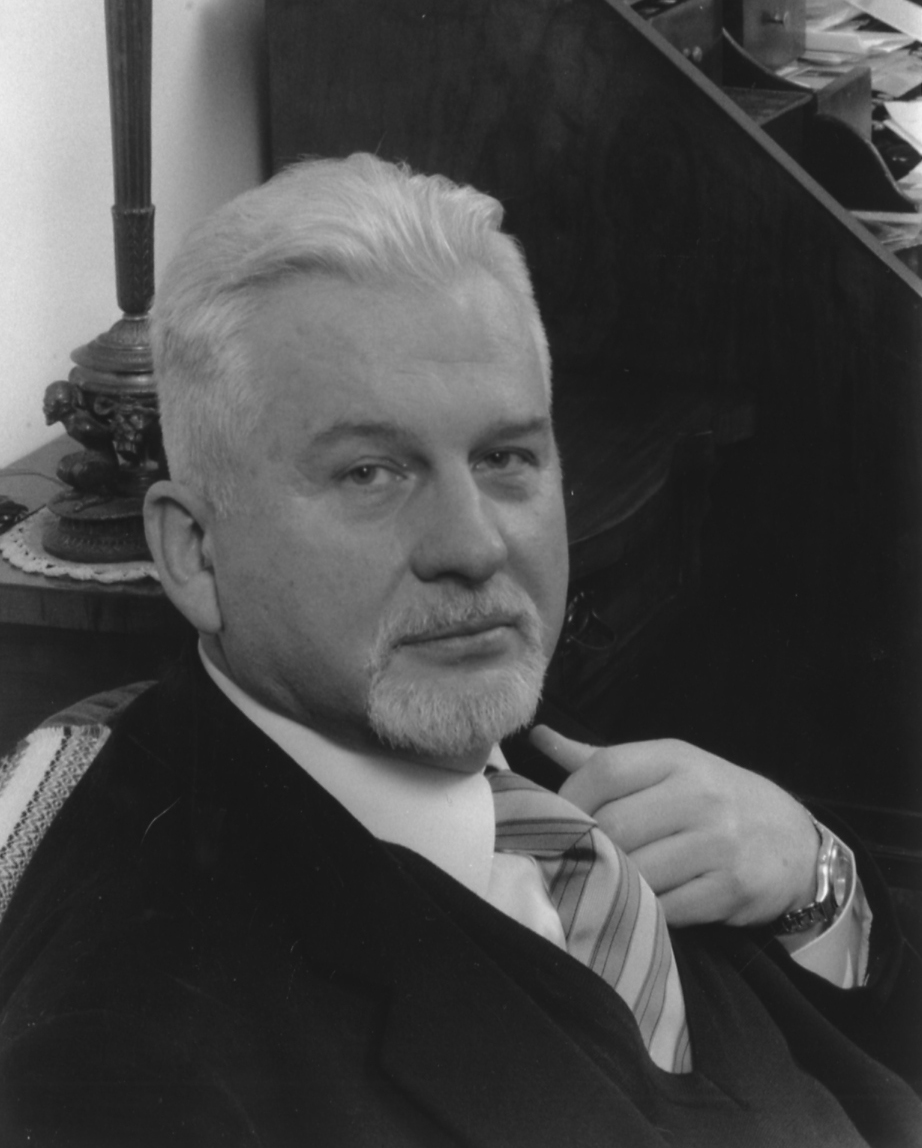
- Woś in 1996
- Born: 19 April 1939; Warsaw, Poland
- Died: 3 November 2026 (aged 87)
- Education: University of Warsaw
- Occupations: Historian; essayist; fiction writer; bibliophile; book collector

Jan Władysław Woś (19 April 1939 – 3 November 2026) was a Polish historian and essayist, as well as a fiction writer, bibliophile and book collector.

== Life and career ==
Woś was born in Warsaw on 19 April 1939. He graduated from the University of Warsaw discussing a thesis on Dante's philosophical system (De amore in Dantis Divina Comoedia quaestiones). Woś studied later in Milan, Louvain, Florence, Pisa, Bonn, and Heidelberg. He taught History of the Eastern Europe at the Universities of Pisa (1976–1987), Heidelberg (1985–86), Trento (1987–2009), and Venice (1990–91), also contributing to anthropological research in both Africa and Amazonia.

His fields of interest were Polish history in the sixteenth century and the history of the Roman Church, particularly regarding Italian/Polish relations. Having obtained his Italian citizenship in 1987, he was awarded a “laurea honoris causa” from the Polish University Abroad of London. Woś was a member of the Société Historique et Littéraire Polonaise de Paris, and of the Polish Society of Arts and Sciences Abroad in London.

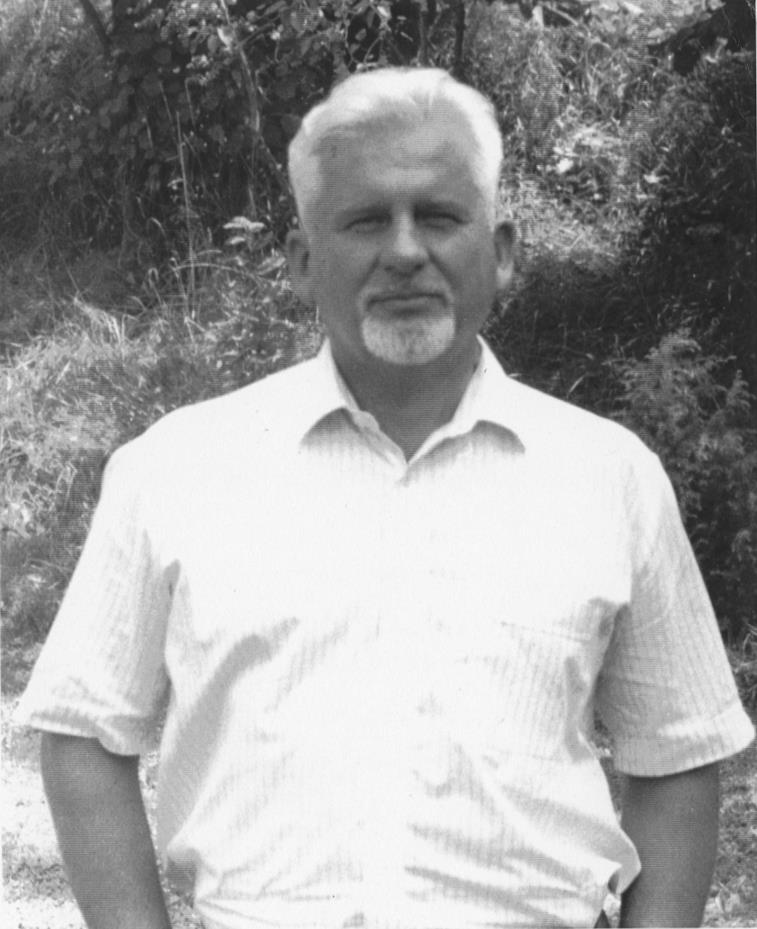
Woś in 2005

He owned remarkable collections of rare books, prints, engravings, parchments from the 10th to the 16th centuries, and topographical maps, all related to Polish history and culture. He contributed to international periodicals, and was in the course of publishing largely informative excerpts from his memoirs and diaries.

Woś died on 3 November 2026, at the age of 87.
