= Aline Desjardins =

Canadian radio and television presenter (1934–2026)

Aline Desjardins OQ
- Desjardins in 1973
- Born: 21 August 1934; Saint-Pascal, Quebec, Canada
- Died: 13 November 2026 (aged 92)
- Occupations: Radio presenter Television presenter

Aline Desjardins (21 August 1934 – 13 November 2026) was a Canadian radio and television presenter.

Desjardins appeared on numerous radio shows for Télévision de Radio-Canada such as Femme d'aujourd'hui, Repères, and Ce soir. For Ici Radio-Canada Première, she hosted D'un soleil à l'autre and La Semaine verte. In 2024, she was named an Officer of the National Order of Quebec (OQ).

Desjardins died on 13 November 2026, at the age of 92.
