= Jacques Bolognesi =

French jazz musician (1947–2026)

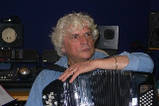
- Bolognesi in 2004

Background information
- Born: 6 January 1947; Gap, France
- Died: 1 November 2026 (aged 79)
- Education: Conservatoire de Paris
- Genre: Jazz
- Occupation: Musician
- Instruments: Trombone; piano; accordion

Jacques Bolognesi (French: [ʒˈak boloɲə-zˈi]; 6 January 1947 – 1 November 2026) was a French jazz musician.

A specialist in trombone, piano, and accordion, he received the first prize of the Conservatoire de Paris in 1969. He was a longtime member of the Orchestre National de Jazz.

Bolognesi died on 1 November 2026, at the age of 79.
