= Stelios Gousios =

Greek basketball player (1937–2026)

Personal information
- Born: 16 October 1937 Thessaloniki, Greece
- Died: 2 November 2026 (aged 89) Thessaloniki, Greece
- Listed height: 6 ft 4 in (1.93 m)

Career information
- Playing career: 1954–1965
- Position: Center
- Number: 13

Career history
- 1954–1965: Aris B.C.

Stelios Gousios (Greek: Στέργιος Γούσιος; 16 October 1937 – 2 November 2026) was a Greek basketball player who played as a center.

Gousios spent his career with Aris B.C. from 1954 to 1965 and played for the Greek national team from 1957 to 1961.

Gousios died in Thessaloniki on 2 November 2026, at the age of 89.
