= Panda Nababan =

Indonesian politician (1944–2026)

Personal details
- Born: 13 February 1944
- Died: 9 November 2026 (aged 82)

Panda Nababan (13 February 1944 – 9 November 2026) was an Indonesian politician. He was an MP from 1999 to 2012. Nababan died on 9 November 2026, at the age of 82.
