= Oleg Lapshin =

Russian football coach (1937–2026)

Personal information
- Full name: Oleg Borisovich Lapshin
- Date of birth: 18 October 1937
- Place of birth: Moscow, Russian SFSR, Soviet Union
- Date of death: 10 November 2026 (aged 89)

Managerial career
- Years: Team
- 1992–1994: Russia women

Oleg Borisovich Lapshin (Russian: Олег Борисович Лапшин; 18 October 1937 – 10 November 2026) was a Russian professional football coach. Lapshin was the coach of Russia women's national team from 1992 to 1994. He died on 10 November 2026, at the age of 89.
