= K. P. Prabhakaran Nair =

Indian agronomist (1937/1938–2026)

- K. P. Prabhakaran Nair (left) with A. P. J. Abdul Kalam in 2008
- Born: 1937 or 1938
- Died: 16 November 2026 (aged 88); Kozhikode, Kerala, India
- Known for: Agriculture
- Scientific career
- Fields: Agronomy

K. P. Prabhakaran Nair (1937 or 1938 – 16 November 2026) was an Indian agronomist. He was a senior fellow of the Alexander von Humboldt Foundation, and was the chairman of an independent committee of experts, appointed by the Supreme Court to investigate Bt brinjal. He wrote his articles for newspapers about issues concerning agriculture in India.

Nair died on 16 November 2026, at the age of 88.

== Books ==
Nair's books include:

- The Agronomy and Economy of Turmeric and Ginger
- The Agronomy and Economy of Black Pepper and Cardamom
- The Agronomy and Economy of Imported Tree Crops of the Developing Countries
