= Skipper Voss =

American bullfighter (1944–2026)

- Born: March 15, 1944; Alvin, Texas, U.S.
- Died: November 17, 2026 (aged 82); Waco, Texas, U.S.
- Occupation: Rodeo bullfighter

Joel "Skipper" Voss (March 15, 1944 – November 17, 2026) was an American professional rodeo bullfighter.

== Life and career ==
Voss was born on March 15, 1944, in Alvin, Texas, to John Robert Voss and Bea Preston Voss. He had a sister, Jody, and a brother, Rowdy. After high school, he attended Ranger Junior College, where he played football and was a pole vaulter.

In 1961, while at Ranger Junior College, he began his rodeo career, first as a bull rider, but then transitioned to being a bullfighter. He joined the Professional Rodeo Cowboys Association in 1973 and appeared at numerous famous rodeos throughout his career, such as Cheyenne Frontier Days, the Pendleton Round-Up, and the Calgary Stampede. He worked the National Finals Rodeo in 1974 and 1978.He initially retired in 1978 due to numerous knee injuries, but returned the very next year when the Wrangler bullfighting competitions initiated. He would go on to win the Wrangler bullfighting world championship in 1982. He continued to work the Wrangler bullfights until two more knee operations forced him to retire for good in 1988.

In 1991, Voss met his wife Connie. They were married a year later. Their son Casey was born in 1999. Voss was also stepfather to Connie's son Cody Bill Campbell from a previous marriage. Voss and his family lived in Waco, Texas.

Voss died on November 17, 2026, at the age of 82.

== Honors ==
- In 2006, Voss was inducted into the Texas Rodeo Cowboy Hall of Fame.
- In 2015, he was inducted as a member of the inaugural class into the Bull Riding Hall of Fame. That same year, he was inducted into the Central Texas Cowboy Hall of Fame.
- In 2016, he was inducted as a member of the inaugural class into the All Cowboy & Arena Champions Hall of Fame.
- In 2017, he received the South Central Texas Rodeo Ring of Honor.

In 2020, he was one of the inaugural inductees into the Original Wrangler Bullfights Hall of Fame.

- In 2023, he was inducted into the National Rodeo Hall of Fame.
- In 2025, he was inducted into the ProRodeo Hall of Fame.
- In 2026, he received the Original Wrangler Bullfights Hall of Fame's Rick Young Lifetime Achievement Award.
