= Ulrich Köhler (archaeologist) =

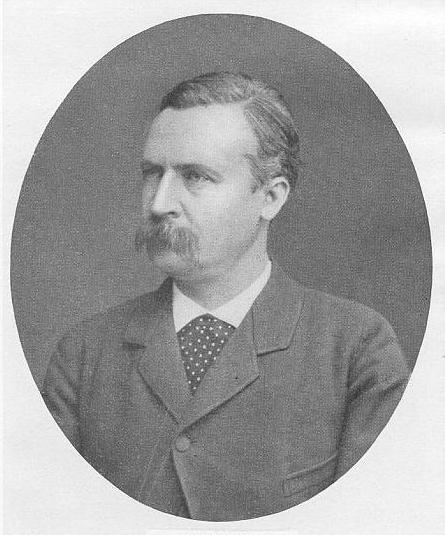

Ulrich Köhler (6 November 1838 Kleinneuhausen, Saxe-Weimar-Eisenach – 24 October 1903 Berlin) was a German archaeologist.

== Biography ==
He studied at the University of Jena and was appointed secretary of the Prussian embassy at Athens (1865) and later was made professor of archaeology at the University of Strassburg. He was governor of the newly founded Archaeological Institute at Athens (1875) and was appointed professor of ancient history at Berlin (1886).

His principal work is the second volume of Corpus inscriptionum Atticarum (Berlin 1877–95), which contains the inscriptions from the time of the Archon Euclides to Augustus. Important also is his Urkunden und Untersuchungen zur Geschichte des delisch-attischen Bundes (Berlin 1870).
