= Halima Ferhat =

Moroccan historian (1941–2026)

Halima Ferhat (Arabic: حليمة فرحات; 1941 – 18 November 2026) was a Moroccan historian who specialized in the Middle Ages of the Maghreb and was a professor at the Mohammed V University. She was also Director of the Institute of African Studies in Rabat. Ferhat died in Rabat on 18 November 2026, aged 85.

== Works ==
=== Books ===
- Sabta des origines. au XIVème siècle, ed. Rabat : Ministère des Affaires Culturelles, 1993, ISBN 9981-832-05-7
- Le soufisme et les zaouias au Maghreb, Casablanca, Ed. Toubkal (2003)
- (with A. Sebti) Al Mujtama' Al Hadari wa al Sulta bi al Maghrib (texts on urban society and power in Morocco, 15th-18th century), 2007
- Le Maghreb aux XIIème et XIIIème siècles: Les siècles de la foi, Wallada, ISBN 9981-823-01-5

=== Articles ===
- Abu l-'Abbas: contestation et sainteté, in: Al-qantara: Revista de estudios árabes, ISSN 0211-3589, Vol. 13, Fasc. 1, 1992, pags. 185-204
- Un monument almoravide: la grande-mosquée de Ceuta/Sabta (approche textuelle), in: Anaquel de estudios árabes, ISSN 1130-3964, Nº 4, 1993, pags. 77-86
- As-Sirr al-Masun de Tahir as-Sadafi: un intinéraire au XIIe siècle, Al-qantara: Revista de estudios árabes, ISSN 0211-3589, Vol. 16, Fasc. 2, 1995, pags. 273-290
- Le Culte du Prophète au Maroc au XIIIe siècle : organisation du pèlerinage et célébration du Mawlid / Halima Ferhat . In La Religion civique à l'époque médiévale et moderne, chrétienté et islam : actes, Rome : Éd. de l'École française de Rome, 1995
- Souverains, saints et fuqaha': le pouvoir en question, in: Al-qantara: Revista de estudios árabes, ISSN 0211-3589, Vol. 17, Fasc. 2, 1996, pags. 375-390
- Les Relations entre le Maghreb et l'Orient au Moyen Âge : pèlerinage, initiation et découverte de l'autre. In: Quaderni mediterranei. - N. 9 (1996)
- Frugalité soufie et banquets de "zaouyas": l'éclariage des sources hagiographiques, in: Medievales: Langue, textes, histoire, ISSN 0751-2708, Nº 33, 1997 (Ejemplar dedicado a: Cultures et nourritures de l'occident musulman), pags. 69-80
- Le saint et son corps: une lutte constante, in: Al-qantara: Revista de estudios árabes, ISSN 0211-3589, Vol. 21, Fasc. 2, 2000, pags. 457-470

=== Co-authored ===
- Assises du pouvoir. Temps médiévaux, territoires africains, Presses Universitaires de Vincennes, 1994, ISBN 2910381021
- Cultures et nourritures de l'Occident musulman, n° 33, Essais dédiés à Bernard Rosenberger, Presses Universitaires de Vincennes, February 1998, n° 33, ISBN 2842920317
- Les pèlerinages de Sakir et de Massa, in: Lieux sacrés, lieux de culte, sanctuaires : approches terminologiques, méthodologiques, historiques et monographiques, 2000, ISBN 2-7283-0602-8, p. 171-178
- (ed. with Halima Ferhat), Pratiques et stratégies identitaires au Sahara, Rabat, Publications de l'Institut des Études Africaines, 2001
- Savoir et négoce à Ceuta aux XIIe et XIIIe siècle, in: Ceuta en el Medievo : la ciudad en el universo árabe, 2002, ISBN 84-932363-4-9, p. 145-174

=== Miscellaneous ===
- Melanges Halima Ferhat, Rabat, Université Mohammed V, 2005
- Marinid Fez: Zenith and Signs of Decline
