= Blas Ziarreta =

Spanish football player and manager (1947–2026)

Personal information
- Full name: Blas Ziarreta Obregón
- Date of birth: 6 February 1947
- Place of birth: Santurtzi, Spain
- Date of death: 17 November 2026 (aged 79)

Youth career
- General Eléctrica

Senior career*
| Years | Team | Apps | (Gls) |
- Getxo
- Gallarta

International career
- Biscay (youth)

Managerial career
- 1978–1979: Sestao
- 1980–1983: Erandio
- 1984–1985: Santurce
- 1987–1988: Lemona
- 1988–1991: Sestao
- 1991–1993: Bilbao Athletic
- 1993–1996: Sestao
- 1996–1997: Aurrerá Vitoria
- 1997–1998: Burgos
- 1998: Gernika
- 1998–1999: Badajoz
- 1999–2003: Eibar
- * Club domestic league appearances and goals

Blas Ziarreta Obregón (6 February 1947 – 17 November 2026) was a Spanish football player and manager.

Ziarreta played for General Eléctrica, and CD Getxo, where he fractured his ankle, and CD Gallarta before military service. He was called up to the youth Biscay autonomous football team. Ziarreta died on 17 November 2026, at the age of 79.
