= Ashok Kumar Mahapatra =

Indian neurosurgeon and academic (1952–2026)

Sir Padma Shri Ashok Kumar Mahapatra
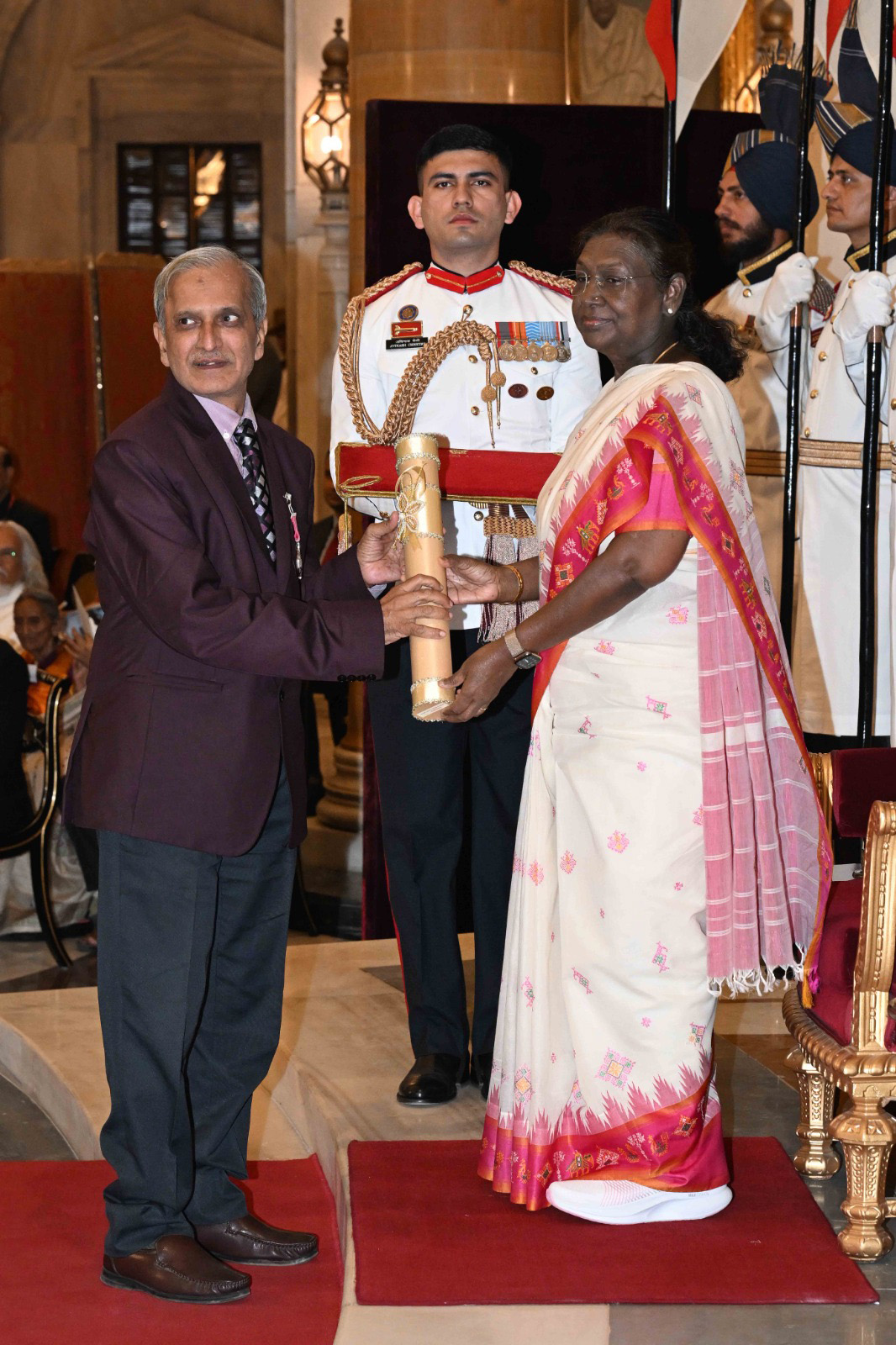
- Mahapatra receiving the Padma Shri in 2025
- Born: 29 December 1952; Puri district, Orissa, India
- Died: 2 November 2026 (aged 73); New Delhi, India
- Occupations: Neurosurgeon, academic
- Known for: Neurosurgery, craniopagus surgery, academic leadership
- Awards: Padma Shri (2024)

Ashok Kumar Mahapatra (29 December 1952 – 2 November 2026) was an Indian neurosurgeon and academic, known for his contributions in neurosurgery and healthcare administration. He was Principal Advisor (Health Sciences) at Siksha 'O' Anusandhan, Bhubaneswar. Mahapatra was conferred with the Padma Shri, India's fourth-highest civilian award, in 2024 for his service in the field of medicine.

== Career ==
Mahapatra headed the Department of Neurosurgery at AIIMS, New Delhi, where he led several complex surgeries. He was the founding Director of AIIMS Bhubaneswar and served as Director at the Sanjay Gandhi Postgraduate Institute of Medical Sciences, Lucknow. He also served as Vice-Chancellor of Siksha ‘O’ Anusandhan University.

He led the 16-hour surgery to successfully separate conjoined craniopagus twins, Jaga and Balia, at AIIMS Delhi, considered the first of its kind in India.

== Research and publications ==
Mahapatra contributed to over 100 scientific articles. His academic profiles are listed in national and international databases.

== Death ==
Mahapatra died from a stroke in New Delhi, on 2 November 2026, at the age of 73.

== Awards and accolades ==
In 2022, he was also conferred the C.V. Raman Award for Scientific Excellence by the Odisha Bigyan Academy.

Mahapatra was awarded the Padma Shri for Medicine in 2024.

A moot court competition at the Kalinga Institute of Industrial Technology is named in his memory and honour: the Dr. Ashok Kumar Mohapatra Memorial Moot Court Competition.
