= Stephen Roberts (Australian footballer) =

Australian rules footballer (1948–2026)

Personal information
- Full name: Stephen Roberts
- Born: 25 November 1948
- Died: 7 November 2026 (aged 77)
- Original team: Springvale
- Height: 191 cm (6 ft 3 in)
- Weight: 86 kg (190 lb)
- Position: Defence

Playing career^{1}
| Years | Club | Games (Goals) |
| 1966–70 | St Kilda | 40 (7) |
- ^{1} Playing statistics correct to the end of 1970.

Stephen Roberts (25 November 1948 – 7 November 2026) was an Australian rules footballer who played with St Kilda in the Victorian Football League (VFL). He died on 7 November 2026, at the age of 77.
