= Catherine Laboubée =

French writer and historian (1955–2026)

- Laboubée in 2011
- Born: 4 May 1955; Rouen, France
- Died: 10 November 2026 (aged 71)
- Occupations: Writer; Historian

Catherine Laboubée (French: [katʁˈin labubˈe]; 4 May 1955 – 10 November 2026) was a French writer and historian.

== Life and career ==
Born in Rouen on 4 May 1955, Laboubée earned a maîtrise and taught art history at various public schools until 1994. She then turned to history, particularly writing biographies on families and communities. She notably wrote a biography of Suzanne Savale, a French Resistance fighter and Holocaust survivor. In 2012, she published the collective work La Belle et le Magnifique, which covered the lives of the parents of William the Conqueror. In 2013, she published a biography on the French rock group Dogs and her brother, lead singer Dominique Laboubée. She became the 2012 recipient of the Prix d'Histoire de la Ville d'Aumal and was a member of the Société des auteurs de Normandie.

Laboubée died on 10 November 2026, at the age of 71.

== Publications ==
- Mémoires darnétalaises (2000)
- Une petite fille dans Fécamp en guerre (2003)
- Rouen Mémoires 44 (2004)
- Avec le sourire et le chant aux lèvres (2008)
- Cogitations d'un vieil insomniaque (2009)
- Suzanne Savale, résistante normande (2011)
- La Fille de Falaise (2012)
- L'Arbre en marche (2012)
- Too much class... Dogs, l'histoire, l'histoire (2013)
