= Constitutional Court of Tatarstan =

Constitutional Court of the Republic of Tatarstan
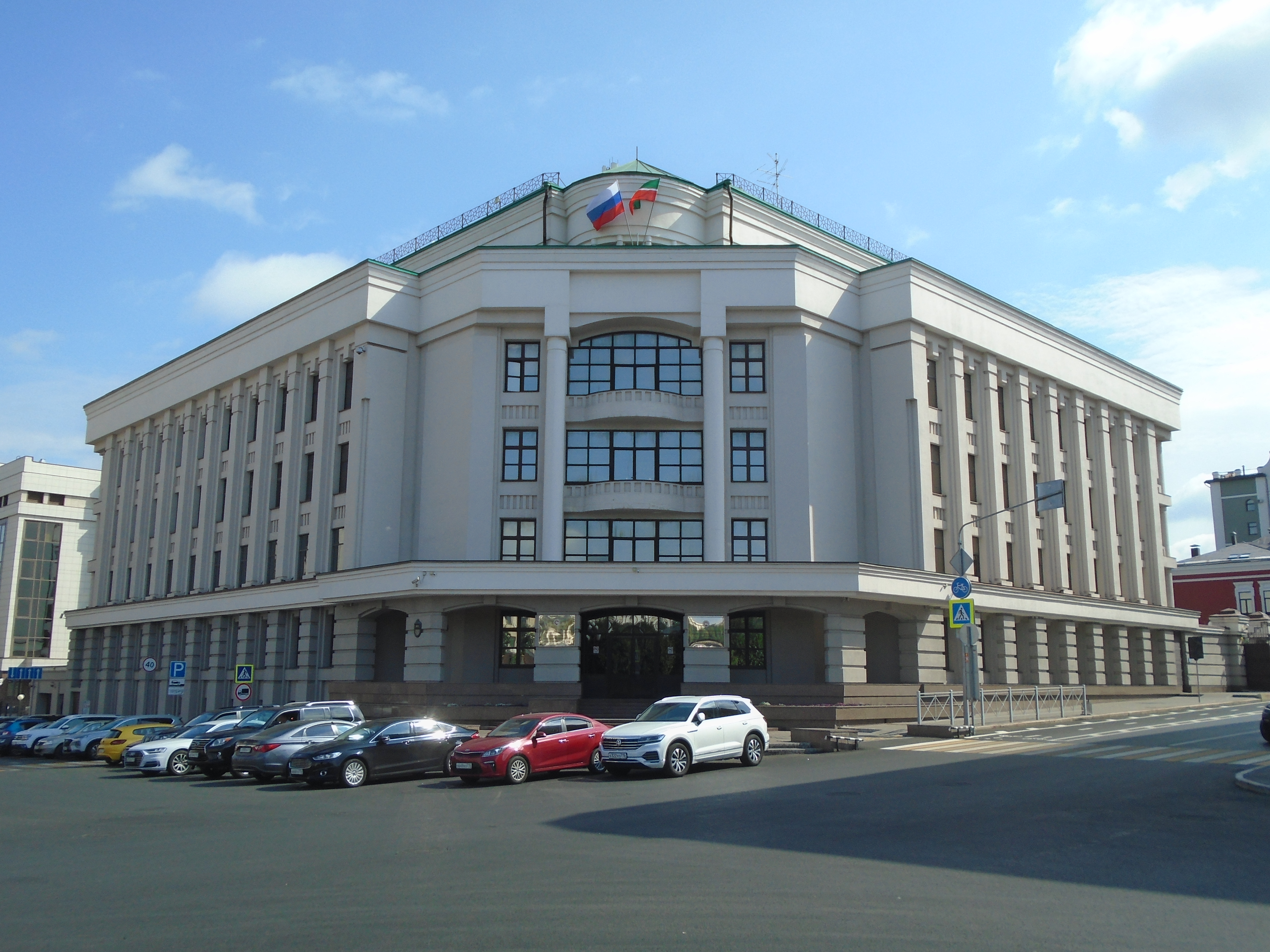

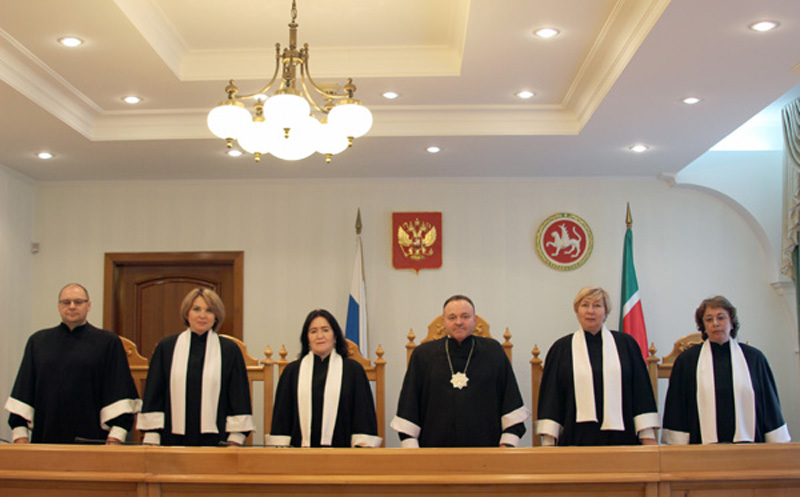
- Interactive map of Constitutional Court of the Republic of Tatarstan
- 55°47′51.6″N 49°7′35.2″E
- Established: 22 December 1992
- Dissolved: 31 December 2022
- Location: 66/33 Pushkin Street, Kazan
- Coordinates: 55°47′51.6″N 49°7′35.2″E
- Composition method: Appointed by the State Council of the Republic of Tatarstan
- Authorised by: Constitution of the Republic of Tatarstan
- Judge term length: Mandatory retirement at age 70
- Number of positions: 6
- Website: ks.tatarstan.ru

The Constitutional Court of the Republic of Tatarstan (Russian: Конституционный Суд Республики Татарстан, Tatar: Татарстан Республикасы Конституция суды, romanized: Tatarstan Respublikası Konstitutsiyä sudı) was a subnational constitutional court of Tatarstan, a republic within Russia. The Court exercised constitutional control over regional laws adopted by the regional legislature and decrees of the Head of Tatarstan, being the court of single instance for such cases.

The Constitutional Court of Tatarstan was preceded by the Committee for Constitutional Supervision of the Tatar ASSR, established in 1990. The Court itself was established in 1992 after the adoption of the Constitution of the Republic of Tatarstan and the Law of the Republic of Tatarstan "On the Constitutional Court of the Republic of Tatarstan". However, the Court began its activity only in 2000.

The Court consisted of a president and five judges, all appointed by the State Council of the Republic of Tatarstan.

The Constitutional Court of the Republic of Tatarstan was disestablished by the 2020 amendments to the Constitution of Russia, among other constitutional and charter courts of the Russian federal subjects. In its place, a new advisory body has been established in the form of the Constitutional Council, which does not have any judicial powers.

During its operation, the Court has heard more than 300 cases, most of which were complaints from citizens regarding violations of their constitutional rights. Experts noted that the abolition of the Court would deprive Tatarstan of one branch of government and, coupled with the renaming of the position of President of Tatarstan to Head of Tatarstan, could lead to the complete loss of any remaining traces of sovereignty.

== List of presidents of the Constitutional Court ==
- Saifikhan Nafiev (2000–2004)
- Viktor Demidov (2004–2014)
- Farkhat Khusnutdinov (2014–2022)

== See also ==
- Constitutional Court of Russia
- Constitutional Court of Bashkortostan
