= Yoshiaki Ishizawa =

Japanese academic (1937–2026)

Yoshiaki Ishizawa (1937 – 4 November 2026) was a Japanese academic who was a professor at Sophia University. He was a recipient of Ramon Magsaysay Award 2017 for "restoration of Angkor Wat since the time of civil war nurturing human resources and specialists of Cambodia to conserve the heritage site resulting Cambodian people to regain the pride for their own cultural heritage". Ishizawa was born in Obihiro, Hokkaido in 1937. He died on 4 November 2026, at the age of 89.
