= Wolf-Dietrich Niemeier =

German classical archaeologist (1947–2026)

Wolf-Dietrich Niemeier (1 May 1947 in Göttingen – 13 November 2026) was a German classical archaeologist. He died on 13 November 2026, at the age of 79.

== Selected publications ==
- Die Palaststilkeramik von Knossos. Stil, Chronologie und historischer Kontext ( Archäologische Forschungen. Band 13). Mann, Berlin 1985, ISBN 3-7861-1184-7 (zugleich Dissertation, Universität Mannheim 1975/76).
- with Meral Akurgal, Michael Kerschner, and Hans Mommsen: Töpferzentren der Ostägäis. Archäometrische und archäologische Untersuchungen zur mykenischen, geometrischen und archaischen Keramik aus Fundorten in Westkleinasien (= Ergänzungshefte zu den Jahresheften des Österreichischen Archäologischen Institutes. Heft 3). Österreichisches Archäologisches Institut, Wien 2002, ISBN 3-900305-39-0.
- with Peter C. Bol and Robert Strasser: Griechenland. Ein Führer zu den antiken Stätten. Reclam, Stuttgart 1998, ISBN 3-15-009627-8, 2. Auflage 2004.
- Der Kuros vom heiligen Tor. Überraschende Neufunde archaischer Skulptur im Kerameikos in Athen (= Antike Welt. Sonderband). Philipp von Zabern, Mainz 2002, ISBN 3-8053-2956-3.
- Das Orakelheiligtum des Apollon von Abai/Kalapodi Eines der bedeutendsten griechischen Heiligtümer nach den Ergebnissen der neuen Ausgrabungen: Harrassowitz, Wiesbaden 2016, ISBN 978-3-447-10708-2.
- with Hans Walter and Angelika Clemente: Ursprung und Frühzeit des Heraion von Samos. Teil 1: Topographie, Architektur und Geschichte (= Samos. Bd. 21, 1). Reichert, Wiesbaden 2019, ISBN 978-3-95490-399-3.
