= Marianna Sutadi =

Indonesian justice and diplomat (1941–2026)

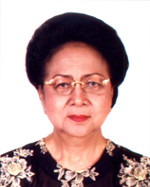
Image of Marianna Sutadi

Marianna Sutadi (October 12, 1941 – November 20, 2026) was the Indonesian Ambassador to Romania and Moldova (appointed in 2010) as well as the "first and only deputy chief justice of the Supreme Court" (March 2004 until her retirement in November 2008).

Sutadi graduated from the Faculty of Law at the University of Indonesia in April 1964 and followed family tradition by becoming a judge. Her career started in September 1964 at the Jakarta Special District Court in September 1964. In 1971, she was assigned to the North-East Jakarta District Court before she became an assistant to the Supreme Court judge from 1981–1984. She "was promoted to be high judge at the Tanjung Karang High Court and the Jakarta High Court until 1993."

Her husband, Sutadi Djajakusuma, was the Indonesian Ambassador to Brazil, Peru and Bolivia, based in Brazil. Sutadi died on November 20, 2026, aged 85.
