= Oleg Viktorov =

Russian politician (1960–2026)

- Олег Викторов

Member of the State Council of the Chuvash Republic
- In office 8 October 2006 – 9 October 2011
- In office 27 July 1998 – 27 July 2002

Personal details
- Born: 21 November 1960 Novoye Baybatyrevo, Yalchiksky District, Chuvash ASSR, Russian SFSR, USSR
- Died: 17 November 2026 (aged 65)
- Party: United Russia
- Profession: Politician, physician

Oleg Nikolayevich Viktorov (Russian: Олег Николаевич Викторов; 21 November 1960 – 17 November 2026) was a Russian physician and politician who was a member of the State Council of the Chuvash Republic from 1998 to 2002 and again from 2006 to 2011.

Viktorov died on 17 November 2026, at the age of 65.
