= List of 2025 deaths in popular music =

This is a list of notable performers of rock music and other forms of popular music, and others directly associated with the music as producers, songwriters, or in other closely related roles, who died in 2025.

== 2025 deaths in popular music ==
| Preceded by 2024 | List of deaths in popular music 2025 | Succeeded by 2026 |

| Name | Age | Date | Location of death | Cause of death |
|---|---|---|---|---|
| A.D.O.R. Rapper | 55 | January 1, 2025 | New York City, New York, United States | Undisclosed |
| Leo Dan; Argentine singer-songwriter | 82 | January 1, 2025 | Miami, Florida, United States | Undisclosed |
| Chad Morgan; Country singer and guitarist | 91 | January 1, 2025 | Gin Gin, Queensland, Australia | Undisclosed |
| Nora Orlandi; Singer, pianist, and film composer | 91 | January 1, 2025 | Rome, Italy | Undisclosed |
| Jean-Michel Defaye; French composer and pianist | 92 | January 1, 2025 | Porto-Vecchio, Corsica, France | Undisclosed |
| Wayne Osmond; The Osmonds | 73 | January 1, 2025 | Salt Lake City, Utah, United States | Stroke |
| Russ North; Cloven Hoof | 59 | January 1, 2025 | Invercargill, Southland, New Zealand | Undisclosed |
| Ferdi Tayfur; Turkish arabesque singer | 79 | January 2, 2025 | Antalya, Turkey | Undisclosed |
| Brenton Wood; Soul singer | 83 | January 3, 2025 | Moreno Valley, California, United States | Natural causes |
| Ed Askew; Folk singer | 84 | January 4, 2025 | New York City, United States | Undisclosed |
| Renuaras "Erkė" Krivelis; Erkė Maiše | 51 | January 5, 2025 | Vilnius, Lithuania | Undisclosed |
| Beej Chaney; The Suburbs | 68 | January 5, 2025 | Hermosa Beach, California, United States | Died while swimming in the ocean |
| Fredrik Lindgren; Unleashed, Terra Firma | 53 | January 5, 2025 | Stockholm, Sweden | Undisclosed |
| Hope Foye; Singer and political activist | 103 | January 6, 2025 | Las Vegas, Nevada, United States | Undisclosed |
| Stella Greka; Singer and actress | 102 | January 6, 2025 | Dionysos, Greece | Undisclosed |
| Ragne Wahlquist; Heavy Load | 69 | January 7, 2025 | Stockholm, Sweden | Undisclosed |
| Peter Yarrow; Peter, Paul and Mary | 86 | January 7, 2025 | New York City, New York, United States | Bladder cancer |
| Sam Moore; Sam & Dave | 89 | January 10, 2025 | Coral Gables, Florida, United States | Complications from surgery |
| Mark Izu; Jazz bassist and composer | 70 | January 12, 2025 | San Francisco, California, United States | Colon cancer |
| P. Fluid (Peter Forrest); 24-7 Spyz | 64 | January 13, 2025 | New York City, New York, United States | Beaten to death |
| Buck White; The Whites | 94 | January 13, 2025 | Hendersonville, Tennessee, United States | Undisclosed |
| Tommy Dix; Singer and actor | 101 | January 15, 2025 | Williamsburg, Virginia, United States | Undisclosed |
| David Lynch; Filmmaker, actor, painter, and musician | 78 | January 15, 2025 | Los Angeles, California, United States | Emphysema |
| Melba Montgomery; Singer and songwriter | 86 | January 15, 2025 | Nashville, Tennessee, United States | Undisclosed |
| Linda Nolan; The Nolans | 65 | January 15, 2025 | Blackpool, England | Breast cancer |
| Toby Myers; Roadmaster, John Mellencamp | 75 | January 16, 2025 | Nashville, Indiana, United States | Cancer |
| Bob Kuban; Musician and bandleader | 84 | January 20, 2025 | Wildwood, Missouri, in the St. Louis area, United States | Stroke |
| Garth Hudson; The Band | 87 | January 21, 2025 | Woodstock, New York, United States | Undisclosed |
| Nunzia Greton Italian singer | 79 | January 21, 2025 | Naples, Italy | |
| Paddy Cole; Irish showband musician | 85 | January 22, 2025 | Dublin, Ireland | Lung cancer |
| Barry Goldberg; The Electric Flag, The Rides | 83 | January 22, 2025 | Los Angeles, California, United States | Non-Hodgkin lymphoma |
| Gabriel Yacoub; Malicorne | 72 | January 22, 2025 | Bourges, France | Undisclosed |
| Edweena Banger; The Nosebleeds, Slaughter & the Dogs | 65 | January 24, 2025 | Manchester, England | Undisclosed |
| Unk; Rapper | 43 | January 24, 2025 | Beverly Hills, California, United States | Heart attack |
| Gary Grier; The Contours | 72 | January 26, 2025 | Detroit, Michigan, Indiana, United States | Undisclosed |
| Judy Johnson (Betty Bonney); Pop singer | 100 | January 29, 2025 | Calabasas, California, United States | Undisclosed |
| Bruce Howe; Fraternity | 77 | January 29, 2025 | Semaphore, South Australia, Australia | Cancer |
| Marianne Faithfull; Pop and rock singer-songwriter and actress | 78 | January 30, 2025 | London, England | Undisclosed |
| Sal Maida; Milk 'N' Cookies, Roxy Music, Sparks | 76 | February 1, 2025 | New York City, New York, United States | Complications from a fall |
| Gene Barge; R&B saxophonist, record producer | 98 | February 2, 2025 | Chicago, Illinois, United States | Natural causes |
| Colin Earl; Mungo Jerry | 82 | February 2, 2025 | Hampton Court, Middlesex, United Kingdom | Undisclosed |
| Barbie Hsu; Singer, actress, and host | 48 | February 2, 2025 | Tokyo, Japan | Pneumonia |
| John Roberts; Traditional folk musician | 80 | February 3, 2025 | Buffalo, New York, United States | Undisclosed |
| Irv Gotti; Record producer and executive | 54 | February 5, 2025 | New York City, New York, United States | Stroke |
| Dave Jerden; Record producer, audio engineer and mixer | 75 | February 5, 2025 | Los Angeles, California, United States | Undisclosed |
| Mike Ratledge; Soft Machine | 81 | February 5, 2025 | Canterbury, England | Short illness |
| Naâman; French reggae singer | 34 | February 7, 2025 | Mont-Saint-Aignan, France | Brain tumor |
| Tommy Hunt; The Flamingos | 91 | February 12, 2025 | Pontefract, West Yorkshire, England | Undisclosed |
| Rick Buckler; The Jam | 69 | February 17, 2025 | Woking, Surrey, England | Short illness |
| Jamie Muir; King Crimson | 82 | February 17, 2025 | Cornwall, England | Undisclosed |
| Paquita la del Barrio; Singer, songwriter, and actress | 77 | February 17, 2025 | Xalapa, Veracruz, Mexico | Undisclosed |
| Karl Cochran; Ace Frehley, Eric Singer Project, Thor | 60 | February 19, 2025 | Bridgewater Township, New Jersey, United States | Car accident |
| Snowy Fleet; The Easybeats | 85 | February 19, 2025 | Sydney, Australia | Undisclosed |
| Jerry Butler; The Impressions | 85 | February 20, 2025 | Chicago, Illinois, United States | Parkinson's disease |
| Gerry Arling; Arling & Cameron | 63 | February 21, 2025 | Amsterdam, Netherlands | Undisclosed |
| Fred Bekky; The Pebbles | 81 | February 21, 2025 | Seattle, Washington, United States | Pneumonia |
| Bill Fay; Singer-songwriter | 81 | February 21, 2025 | London, England | Parkinson's disease |
| Khalil Fong; Singer-songwriter | 41 | February 21, 2025 | Dali City, Yunnan, China | Pneumothorax |
| Gwen McCrae; Singer | 81 | February 21, 2025 | Pensacola, Florida, United States | Stroke |
| Voletta Wallace; Record producer; mother of The Notorious B.I.G. | 78 | February 21, 2025 | Stroudsburg, Pennsylvania, United States | Natural causes |
| Linsey Alexander; Blues singer and guitarist for Buddy Guy, A.C. Reed, Magic Slim, and B.B. King | 82 | February 22, 2025 | Chicago, Illinois, United States | Undisclosed |
| Ken Parker; Jamaican reggae and gospel musician | 76 | February 22, 2025 | Miami, Florida, United States | Undisclosed |
| Gianni Pettenati Italian singer, music critic and writer | 79 | February 22, 2025 | Albenga, Italy | Long illness |
| Jacques De Jongh; Hush, John Paul Young and the All Stars, Redhouse | 84 | February 23, 2025 | Melbourne, Victoria, Australia | Undisclosed |
| Chris Jasper; The Isley Brothers, Isley-Jasper-Isley | 73 | February 23, 2025 | New York, United States | Cancer |
| Roberta Flack; Singer and songwriter | 88 | February 24, 2025 | New York City, New York, United States | Amyotrophic lateral sclerosis |
| Robert John; Soft rock singer and songwriter | 79 | February 24, 2025 | Las Vegas, Nevada, United States | Stroke |
| Coburn Pharr; Annihilator, Omen | 62 | February 25, 2025 | United States | Undisclosed |
| David Johansen; New York Dolls | 75 | February 28, 2025 | New York City, New York, United States | Cancer |
| Angie Stone; The Sequence | 63 | March 1, 2025 | Montgomery, Alabama, United States | Car accident |
| Joey Molland; Badfinger | 77 | March 1, 2025 | Hopkins, Minnesota, United States | Multiple health issues |
| Edip Akbayram; Turkish musician | 74 | March 2, 2025 | Üsküdar, Istanbul, Turkey | Multiple organ failure |
| Frank Maher; Folk musician | 90 | March 2, 2025 | Newport, Isle of Wight, England | Undisclosed |
| Herb Greene; Photographer of rock musicians | 82 | March 3, 2025 | Maynard, Massachusetts, United States | A long illness |
| Geraint Jarman; Welsh musician, poet, and television producer | 74 | March 3, 2025 | Cardiff, Wales | Undisclosed |
| Jeffrey Runnings; For Against | 61 | March 3, 2025 | Lincoln, Nebraska, United States | Cancer |
| Bob Rupe; Cracker, The Silos | 68 | March 3, 2025 | | Undisclosed |
| Eleonora Giorgi Italian actress, director and singer | 71 | March 3, 2025 | Rome, Italy | Pancreatic cancer |
| Roy Ayers; Jazz-funk vibraphonist, record producer, and composer | 84 | March 4, 2025 | New York City, New York, United States | Long illness |
| Harry Elston; The Friends of Distinction | 86 | March 4, 2025 | United States | Undisclosed |
| Edesio Alejandro; Cuban film composer | 66 | March 5, 2025 | Alcalá de Henares, Spain | Cancer |
| Randy Brown; R&B musician and soul singer | 72 | March 5, 2025 | Memphis, Tennessee, United States | Undisclosed |
| DJ Funk; DJ and music producer | 54 | March 5, 2025 | Chicago, Illinois, United States | Cancer |
| Troy Seals; Country and soul singer and songwriter | 86 | March 6, 2025 | Hendersonville, Tennessee, United States | Undisclosed |
| Brian James; The Damned, The Lords of the New Church, London SS | 74 | March 6, 2025 | London, England | Undisclosed |
| Danny Cox; Musician and singer-songwriter | 81 | March 7, 2025 | Kansas City, United States | Undisclosed |
| D'Wayne Wiggins; Tony! Toni! Toné! | 64 | March 7, 2025 | Oakland, California, United States | Bladder cancer |
| Bill Ashton; Jazz saxophonist and director of the National Youth Jazz Orchestra | 88 | March 8, 2025 | United Kingdom | Undisclosed |
| Beau Dozier; R&B and hip hop songwriter and record producer | 45 | March 10, 2025 | Los Angeles, California, United States | Undisclosed |
| Stedman Pearson; Five Star | 60 | March 10, 2025 | London, England | Complications from diabetes |
| Wheesung; South Korean R&B singer | 43 | March 10, 2025 | Seoul, Korea | Undisclosed |
| Bob Rivers; Radio personality and parodies musician | 68 | March 11, 2025 | Vermont, United States | Esophageal cancer |
| Cocoa Tea; Reggae singer-songwriter | 65 | March 11, 2025 | Fort Lauderdale, Florida, United States | Cardiac arrest |
| Peter Wabitt (Peter Allen); Ampage | 65 | March 12, 2025 | California, United States | Undisclosed |
| Mark "Porkchop" Holder; Black Diamond Heavies | 52 | March 13, 2025 | Dayton, Tennessee, United States | Undisclosed |
| Ann Sexton; R&B and soul singer | 78 | March 13, 2025 | | Undisclosed |
| Yallunder; South African singer and songwriter | 30 | March 13, 2025 | Johannesburg, Gauteng, South Africa | A long illness |
| Bruno Romani; Italian saxophonist, flutist, and composer | 65 | March 14, 2025 | Lucca, Italy | Undisclosed |
| Les Binks; Judas Priest | 73 | March 15, 2025 | London, England | Undisclosed |
| Dandy Bestia (Fabio Testoni); Skiantos | 72 | March 16, 2025 | Bentivoglio, Bologna, Italy | Natural causes |
| Andrej Gjorgieski; DNK | 43 | March 16, 2025 | Kočani, North Macedonia | Injuries from fire |
| Rob de Nijs; Dutch singer and actor | 82 | March 16, 2025 | Bennekom, Netherlands | Parkinson's disease |
| Jesse Colin Young; The Youngbloods | 83 | March 16, 2025 | Aiken, South Carolina, United States | Heart attack |
| Rod Clark; The Moody Blues | 82 | March 17, 2025 | Suffolk, England | Undisclosed |
| Peter Farrelly; Fruupp | 76 | March 17, 2025 | Belfast, Northern Ireland | Undisclosed |
| Aurelio Martínez; Honduran singer and guitarist | 55 | March 17, 2025 | Roatán, Honduras | Plane crash |
| AnNa R. Rosenstolz, Gleis 8 | 55 | March 17, 2025 | Berlin, Germany | Undisclosed |
| Nadia Cassini; Actress and singer | 76 | March 18, 2025 | Reggio Calabria, Italy | A long illness |
| Eddie Adcock; The Country Gentlemen | 86 | March 20, 2025 | Lebanon, Tennessee, United States | Undisclosed |
| Oleg Baranov; Tequilajazzz, S.P.O.R.T. | 57 | March 20, 2025 | St. Petersburg, Russia | Undisclosed |
| Leanne Cowie; The Scientists | 60 | March 20, 2025 | Perth, Australia | Undisclosed |
| Larry Tamblyn; The Standells | 82 | March 21, 2025 | Newnan, Georgia, United States | Undisclosed |
| Andy Peebles; DJ and radio presenter | 76 | March 22, 2025 | Blackburn, Lancashire, England | Undisclosed |
| Francesco Benozzo; Italian poet and musician | 56 | March 22, 2025 | Ligorzano, Modena, Italy | Undisclosed |
| Paul "Wags" Wagstaff; Paris Angels, Black Grape, Happy Mondays | 60 | March 22, 2025 | United Kingdom | Undisclosed |
| Kevan Staples; Rough Trade | 74 | March 23, 2025 | Toronto, Ontario, United States | Undisclosed |
| Huey Willams; Jackson Southernaires | 86 | March 24, 2025 | Smithdale, Mississippi, United States | Undisclosed |
| Alan Cuckston; Harpsichordist, pianist, conductor, and lecturer | 85 | March 24, 2025 | Turnham Hall (near Selby, North Yorkshire) | Undisclosed |
| Tapani Kansa; Finnish singer | 76 | March 25, 2025 | Kotka, Finland | Complications after gallbladder surgery |
| Sanjida Khatun; Bangladeshi musicologist | 91 | March 25, 2025 | Dhaka, Bangladesh | Undisclosed |
| Terry Manning; Producer, musician, and photographer | 77 | March 25, 2025 | El Paso, Texas, United States | Accidental fall at home |
| Alice Tan Ridley; Gospel and R&B singer | 72 | March 25, 2025 | New York City, New York, United States | Undisclosed |
| Shushama Das; Bangladeshi folk singer | 94 | March 26, 2025 | Sylhet, Bangladesh | Natural causes |
| Tommy Rey; Sonora Palacios | 80 | March 26, 2025 | Viña del Mar, Chile | Heart attack |
| Young Scooter; Rapper | 39 | March 28, 2025 | Atlanta, Georgia, United States | Complications from a leg injury incurred while fleeing the police |
| Dick Damron; Canadian country and gospel singer songwriter | 91 | March 29, 2025 | Lacombe, Alberta, Canada | Undisclosed |
| Richard Chamberlain; Actor and singer | 90 | March 29, 2025 | Waimānalo, Hawaii, United States | Stroke |
| Tracy Schwarz; New Lost City Ramblers, Ginny Hawker and Tracy Schwarz | 86 | March 29, 2025 | Elkins, West Virginia, United States | Undisclosed |
| Enrique Bátiz; Mexican pianist and conductor | 82 | March 30, 2025 | Mexico City, Mexico | Undisclosed |
| Marinko Colnago; Novi fosili | 83 | March 30, 2025 | Viña del Mar, Chile | Undisclosed |
| John Nelson; Classical conductor | 83 | March 31, 2025 | Chicago, Illinois, United States | Natural causes |
| J Nyi Nyi; Burmese singer and musician | 71 | March 31, 2025 | Yangon, Myanmar | Undisclosed |
| Volkan Konak; Turkish folk singer | 58 | March 31, 2025 | Famagusta, Cyprus | Heart attack – collapsed on stage during a concert |
| George Freeman; Jazz guitarist | 97 | April 1, 2025 | Chicago, Illinois, United States | Undisclosed |
| Wayne Handy; Rock and roll singer and songwriter | 89 | April 1, 2025 | Devon, Pennsylvania, United States | Undisclosed |
| Alfi Kabiljo; Croatian composer and musician | 89 | April 1, 2025 | Zagreb, Croatia | Undisclosed |
| Johnny Tillotson; Singer and songwriter | 86 | April 1, 2025 | Los Angeles, California, United States | Parkinson's disease |
| Michael Hurley; Folk singer and songwriter | 83 | April 3, 2025 | Astoria, Oregon, United States | Natural causes |
| Amadou Bagayoko; Amadou & Mariam | 70 | April 4, 2025 | Bamako, Mali | Following an illness |
| Pasha Technique; Russian rapper and music producer | 40 | April 5, 2025 | Changwat Phuket, Thailand | Drug overdose |
| Dave Allen; Gang of Four, Glassjaw | 69 | April 5, 2025 | Portland, Oregon, United States | Dementia |
| Roberto De Simone; Italian musicians, stage director and composer | 91 | April 6, 2025 | Naples, Italy | Undisclosed |
| Pongsri Woranuch; Thai luk thung singer | 85 | April 6, 2025 | Bangkok, Thailand | Lung disease |
| Al Barile; SSD | 63 | April 6, 2025 | Boston, Massachusetts, United States | Rectal cancer |
| Anna Slováčková; Czech singer and actress | 29 | April 6, 2025 | Prague, Czechia | Lung cancer |
| Clem Burke; Blondie, Ramones | 70 | April 7, 2025 | Saratoga, California, United States | Cancer |
| William Finn; Composer and lyricist | 73 | April 8, 2025 | Bennington, Vermont, United States | Pulmonary fibrosis |
| Rubby Pérez; Dominican merengue singer | 69 | April 8, 2025 | Santo Domingo, Dominican Republic | Injuries from roof collapse |
| Lenny Welch; MOR and pop singer | 86 | April 8, 2025 | Kissimmee, Florida, United States | A long illness |
| Drew Zingg; Rock, blues, soul, and jazz guitarist | 68 | April 10, 2025 | San Francisco, California, United States | Undisclosed |
| Titiek Puspa; Indonesian singer and songwriter | 87 | April 10, 2025 | Jakarta, Indonesia | Intracerebral hemorrhage |
| Mike Berry; English singer and actor | 82 | April 11, 2025 | Kingston upon Thames, England | Undisclosed |
| Max Romeo; Jamaican reggae singer | 80 | April 11, 2025 | Saint Andrew Parish, Jamaica | A heart-related issue |
| Roy Thomas Baker; Record producer, songwriter, and arranger | 78 | April 12, 2025 | Lake Havasu City, Arizona, United States | Undisclosed |
| Pilita Corrales; Filipino singer and actress | 85 | April 12, 2025 | Manila, Philippines | Undisclosed |
| Nino Tempo; Nino Tempo & April Stevens, The Wrecking Crew | 90 | April 12, 2025 | Niagara Falls, New York, United States | Undisclosed |
| Jed the Fish; Radio DJ | 69 | April 14, 2025 | Pasadena, California, United States | Lung cancer |
| Wink Martindale; DJ, radio personality, game show host, and television producer | 91 | April 15, 2025 | Rancho Mirage, California, United States | Undisclosed |
| Nora Aunor; Filipino singer and actress | 71 | April 16, 2025 | Pasig, Philippines | Undisclosed |
| Roger McLachlan; New Zealand bass guitarist; Little River Band | 71 | April 16, 2025 | Melbourne, Australia | Pancreatic cancer |
| Mac Gayden; Rock/country singer-songwriter and guitarist | 83 | April 16, 2025 | Nashville, Tennessee, United States | Undisclosed |
| Joel Krosnick; Cellist, soloist, recitalist, and chamber musician | 84 | April 16, 2025 | Hastings-on-Hudson, New York, United States | Undisclosed |
| Peter Ablinger; Austrian composer | 66 | April 17, 2025 | Berlin, Germany | Undisclosed |
| Colin Berry; British radio DJ and presenter | 79 | April 17, 2025 | United Kingdom | Undisclosed |
| Nuno Guerreiro; Ala dos Namorados | 52 | April 17, 2025 | Lisbon, Portugal | Undisclosed |
| Mizuki Itagaki; M!LK | 24 | April 17, 2025 | Tokyo, Japan | Undisclosed accident |
| Clodagh Rodgers; Northern Irish singer | 78 | April 18, 2025 | Cobham, Surrey, England | A long illness |
| Ricky Siahaan; Indonesian guitarist and member of Seringai | 48 | April 19, 2025 | Tokyo, Japan | Heart attack |
| Cristina Buarque; Brazilian singer and composer | 74 | April 20, 2025 | Brazil | Cancer |
| Kimble Rendall; Australian director, musician and writer; XL Capris, Hoodoo Gurus | 68 | April 20, 2025 | Sydney, New South Wales, Australia | Undisclosed |
| Hajji Alejandro; Filipino singer and actor | 70 | April 21, 2025 | Manila, Philippines | Colorectal cancer |
| David Briggs; Keyboardist, record producer, arranger, composer, and studio owner; Nashville A-Team, Nashville Cats, TCB Band, Area Code 615 | 82 | April 22, 2025 | Brookings, Oregon, United States | Undisclosed |
| Waltraut Haas; Austrian actress and singer | 97 | April 23, 2025 | Vienna, Austria | Undisclosed |
| Lulu Roman; Comedian and singer | 78 | April 23, 2025 | Bellingham, Washington, United States | Undisclosed |
| David Thomas; Pere Ubu, Rocket from the Tombs | 71 | April 23, 2025 | Brighton and Hove, England | A long illness |
| Edy Star; Brazilian singer-songwriter, actor and artist | 87 | April 24, 2025 | San Paulo, Brazil | Respiratory failure |
| Roy Phillips; The Peddlers | 83 | April 24, 2025 | Christchurch, New Zealand | Undisclosed |
| Peter McIan; Musician and songwriter; Men at Work record producer; The City | 78 | April 24, 2025 | | Undisclosed |
| Kari Løvaas; Norwegian opera singer | 85 | April 24, 2025 | Schaffhausen, Switzerland | Undisclosed |
| Richard Wernick; Composer | 91 | April 25, 2025 | Haverford, Pennsylvania, United States | Age-related causes |
| Paul A. Batiste; Jazz musician and educator; Batiste family | 74 | April 25, 2025 | New Orleans, Louisiana, United States | Lung cancer |
| Wizz Jones; Acoustic guitarist and singer-songwriter | 86 | April 27, 2025 | San Antonio, Texas, United States | Natural causes, possible health issues |
| Andy Bey; Jazz singer and pianist | 85 | April 27, 2025 | Englewood, New Jersey, United States | Undisclosed |
| Brian Montana; Possessed | 60 | April 28, 2025 | San Francisco, California, United States | Shot by police |
| Mike Peters; The Alarm, Dead Men Walking, Big Country | 66 | April 29, 2025 | Dyserth, Wales | Richter's Syndrome, chronic lymphocytic leukaemia |
| Christfried Schmidt; German classical composer and arranger | 92 | April 29, 2025 | Berlin, Germany | Undisclosed |
| Joe Louis Walker; Electric blues guitarist, singer-songwriter, and record producer | 75 | April 30, 2025 | Poughkeepsie, New York, United States | Cardiac-related illness |
| Steve Price; Thor | 65 | April, 2025 | Montana, United States | Undisclosed |
| Nana Caymmi; Brazilian singer | 84 | May 1, 2025 | Humaitá, Rio de Janeiro, Brazil | Multiple organ failure |
| Jill Sobule; Singer-songwriter | 66 | May 1, 2025 | Woodbury, Minnesota, United States | House fire |
| Karel Bláha; Czech opera singer | 77 | May 2, 2025 | Czechia | Prolonged health complications |
| Jim Smith; Animator and musician | 70 | May 2, 2025 | Texas, United States | Heart attack |
| Jeremiah Justin Simms Singer-songwriter | 21 | May 5, 2025 | Florida, United States | Drug Overdose |
| Nathan Jerde; The Ponys | 50 | May 5, 2025 | United States | Undisclosed |
| May Abrahamse; South African soprano and opera singer | 94 | May 5, 2025 | Cape Town, South Africa | Undisclosed |
| James Baker; The Victims, The Scientists, Hoodoo Gurus, Beasts of Bourbon | 71 | May 5, 2025 | Perth, Australia | Cancer |
| Squire Parsons; Gospel singer-songwriter | 77 | May 5, 2025 | Goodlettsville, Tennessee, United States | Heart attack |
| Luigi Lopez; Italian singer and composer | 77 | May 6, 2025 | Civita Castellana, Viterbo, Italy | Undisclosed |
| Vakhtang Machavariani; Georgian composer and conductor | 74 | May 6, 2025 | Tbilisi, Georgia | Undisclosed |
| Ronald Corp; Composer, conductor and Anglican priest | 74 | May 7, 2025 | Bath, Somerset, England | Complications following earlier surgery |
| Xatar; Kurdish-German rapper | 43 | May 7, 2025 | Cologne, Germany | Complications from stroke |
| Stewart Francke; Singer-songwriter | 66 | May 9, 2025 | Huntington Woods, Michigan, United States | Stroke |
| Johnny Rodriguez; Country singer | 73 | May 9, 2025 | Corpus Christi, Texas, United States | Undisclosed |
| Mustafa Zaman Abbasi; Bangladeshi musicologist | 88 | May 10, 2025 | Dhaka, Bangladesh | Respiratory complications |
| Matthew Best; British bass singer and conductor | 68 | May 10, 2025 | United Kingdom | Cancer |
| Kafon; Tunisian rapper and actor | 42 | May 10, 2025 | Tunis, Tunisia | Multiple health issues |
| Larry Lee; The Ozark Mountain Daredevils | 78 | May 10, 2025 | Springfield, Missouri, United States | Undisclosed |
| Leila Negra; German singer and actress | 95 | May 11, 2025 | Hamburg, Germany | Undisclosed |
| John Edwards; The Spinners | 80 | May 11, 2025 | Gwinnett County, Georgia, United States | Undisclosed |
| Alena Veselá; Classical organist and musical teacher | 101 | May 11, 2025 | Brno, Czechia | Undisclosed |
| Ernst Mahle; German-Brazilian composer and conductor | 96 | May 12, 2025 | Piracicaba, São Paulo, Brazil | Undisclosed |
| Yasunao Tone; Japanese jazz composer and sound artist | 90 | May 12, 2025 | Manhattan, United States | Age-related complications |
| Billy Earheart; Country keyboardist; The Amazing Rhythm Aces, The Bama Band | 71 | May 13, 2025 | Fulton, Mississippi, United States | Cancer |
| Dharío Primero; Dominican singer | 72 | May 14, 2025 | Orlando, Florida, United States | Lung cancer and heart problems |
| Terry Draper; Drummer for Klaatu | 73 | May 15, 2025 | Newmarket, Ontario | Leukemia |
| Luigi Alva; Peruvian operatic tenor and opera singer | 98 | May 15, 2025 | Barlassina, Italy | Undisclosed |
| Charles Strouse; Composer and lyricist | 96 | May 15, 2025 | New York City, New York, United States | Undisclosed |
| Junior Byles; Jamaican reggae singer | 77 | May 15, 2025 | Jamaica | Undisclosed |
| Dada KD; Ghanaian highlife musician | 56 | May 16, 2025 | Accra, Ghana | Sudden medical emergency |
| Rodney Brown; Dyke and the Blazers | 78 | May 17, 2025 | Phoenix, Arizona, United States | Undisclosed |
| Roger Nichols; Songwriter, composer and multi-instrumentalist | 84 | May 17, 2025 | Oregon, United States | Undisclosed |
| Werenoi; French rapper | 31 | May 17, 2025 | Paris, France | Cardiac arrest |
| Heorhiy Gina; Ukrainian composer | 93 | May 19, 2025 | Germany | Undisclosed causes heart stop |
| Chris Hager; Rough Cutt, Mickey Ratt | 67 | May 19, 2025 | San Diego, California, United States | Undisclosed |
| Gintaras Bendžius; Music producer of Mango, Junior, Pikaso, Amberlife, Geltona, Deivis | 53 | May 19, 2025 | Bergsfjord, Norway | Boat accident |
| Adam Ramey; Dropout Kings | 31 | May 19, 2025 | Phoenix, Arizona, United States | Suicide |
| Michael B. Tretow; Swedish record producer and sound engineer for ABBA | 80 | May 20, 2025 | Stockholm, Sweden | Undisclosed |
| Mark Greene; Lead R&B singer of The Moments | 67 | May 20, 2025 | Washington, D.C., United States | Undisclosed |
| Dre’Love (André Thomas Halyards) Radical Stuff, Neffa & i messaggeri della dopa, Almamegretta, Reggae National Tickets | 55 | May 20, 2025 | Florence, Italy | |
| Frank Gibson Jr. New Zealand jazz drummer | 79 | May 21, 2025 | Auckland area, New Zealand | Undisclosed |
| Guy Klucevsek; Accordionist and composer | 78 | May 22, 2025 | Staten Island, New York, United States | Neuroendocrine cancer |
| James Lowe; The Electric Prunes | 82 | May 22, 2025 | Santa Barbara, California, United States | Cardiac arrest |
| Dan Storper; Record label executive | 74 | May 22, 2025 | United States | Cancer |
| Daniel Williams; The Devil Wears Prada | 39 | May 22, 2025 | somewhere near San Diego, California, United States | Plane crash |
| Lillian Boutté; Jazz singer | 75 | May 23, 2025 | New Orleans, Louisiana, United States | Lengthy illness |
| Kenny Marco; Rock guitarist; Grant Smith & The Power, Motherlode, Blood, Sweat & Tears | 78 | May 24, 2025 | Saskatoon, Canada | Cancer |
| Simon House; Multi-instrumentalist and composer for Hawkwind, David Bowie, Third Ear Band | 76 | May 25, 2025 | Michigan, United States | Cancer |
| Ángel Mahler; Argentine conductor and composer | 65 | May 25, 2025 | Buenos Aires, Argentina | Melanoma |
| Michael Sumler; Kool & the Gang | 71 | May 25, 2025 | Mableton, Georgia, United States | Car crash |
| Foday Musa Suso; Gambian mandé singer and kora player | 75 | May 25, 2025 | Brikama, Gambia | Undisclosed |
| Gigi Canu; Planet Funk | 66 | May 26, 2025 | Naples, Italy | Colon cancer |
| Rick Derringer; The McCoys; Record producer for "Weird Al" Yankovic | 77 | May 26, 2025 | Ormond Beach, Florida, United States | Undisclosed |
| İlhan Şeşen; Turkish musician | 76 | May 26, 2025 | Istanbul, Turkey | Lung cancer |
| Freddie Aguilar; Filipino musician and singer-songwriter | 72 | May 27, 2025 | Quezon City, Philippines | Multiple organ failure |
| Brian Kellock; Scottish jazz pianist | 63 | May 27, 2025 | Glasgow, Scotland | Undisclosed |
| Irianti Erningpraja; Indonesian singer, songwriter and actress | 59 | May 27, 2025 | South Jakarta, Indonesia | Cervical cancer |
| Al Foster; Jazz drummer | 82 | May 28, 2025 | New York City, New York, United States | Undisclosed |
| Per Nørgård; Danish composer | 92 | May 28, 2025 | Copenhagen, Denmark | Long Illness |
| Alf Clausen; Television composer | 84 | May 29, 2025 | New York City, New York, United States | Pancreatic cancer |
| Susann McDonald; Classical harpist | 90 | May 29, 2025 | Bloomington, Indiana, United States | Natural causes |
| Charles Wadsworth; Classical pianist | 96 | May 29, 2025 | Upper East Side, New York, United States | Undisclosed |
| Renée Victor; Singer and actress | 86 | May 30, 2025 | Sherman Oaks, California, United States | Lymphoma |
| Marcie Jones; Australian singer; Marcie and The Cookies | 79 | June 1, 2025 | Melbourne, Australia | Leukemia |
| Monica Nielsen; Swedish singer and actress | 87 | June 1, 2025 | Stockholm, Sweden | Undisclosed |
| Colin Jerwood; Conflict | 63 | June 2, 2025 | United Kingdom | Short illness |
| Frankie Jordan; French rock and roll singer | 86 | June 3, 2025 | Neuilly-sur-Seine, France | Cancer |
| Eugen Doga; Moldovan composer | 88 | June 3, 2025 | Chișinău, Moldova | Undisclosed |
| Nicole Croisille; French singer and actress | 88 | June 4, 2025 | Paris, France | Undisclosed |
| Arthur Hamilton; Songwriter | 98 | June 4, 2025 | Los Angeles, California, United States | Undisclosed |
| Norman Hutchins; Gospel singer-songwriter | 62 | June 5, 2025 | Carson, California, United States | Diabetes and kidney failure |
| Wayne Lewis; Atlantic Starr | 68 | June 5, 2025 | Queens, New York, United States | Undisclosed |
| Ariel Kalma; French new-age composer and electronic musician | 78 | June 5, 2025 | New South Wales, Australia | Obstructive sleep apnea |
| Walter “The Beast” Fricke Schrott nach 8 | | June 5, 2025 | | |
| Mike Ejeagha; Nigerian folk singer and guitarist | 95 | June 6, 2025 | Enugu, Nigeria | Long illness |
| Cheo Zorrilla; Dominican composer, trumpet player, and singer | 75 | June 8, 2025 | Santo Domingo, Dominican Republic | Stroke |
| Sly Stone; Sly and the Family Stone | 82 | June 9, 2025 | Los Angeles, California, United States | COPD |
| Douglas McCarthy; Nitzer Ebb | 58 | June 11, 2025 | Kensington, Greater London, England | Undisclosed |
| Brian Wilson; The Beach Boys | 82 | June 11, 2025 | Beverly Hills, California, United States | Respiratory arrest |
| Louis Moholo; South African jazz drummer for The Blue Notes | 80 | June 13, 2025 | Cape Town, South Africa | Long illness |
| Bira Presidente; Brazilian samba musician and composer; Fundo de Quintal | 88 | June 14, 2025 | Brazil | Prostate cancer |
| Kollangudi Karuppayee; Indian folk singer and actress | 99 | June 14, 2025 | Kollangudi village, located in the Sivaganga district of Tamil Nadu, India | Age-related illness |
| Gusti Irwan Wibowo; Indonesian singer and songwriter | 25 | June 15, 2025 | Lembang, Bandung, West Java, Indonesia | Heart attack |
| Sven-Åke Johansson; Swedish drummer, composer and visual artist | 82 | June 15, 2025 | Berlin, Germany | Long illness |
| John Reid; Nightcrawlers | 61 | June 16, 2025 | Glasgow, Scotland | Undisclosed |
| Hélio Delmiro; Brazilian guitarist | 78 | June 16, 2025 | Brasília, Brazil | Kidney disease |
| Alfred Brendel; Czech-born Austrian pianist | 94 | June 17, 2025 | London, England | Undisclosed |
| Charles Burrell; Classical and jazz bass player | 104 | June 17, 2025 | Denver, Colorado, United States | Undisclosed |
| Lou Christie; Pop and soft rock singer-songwriter | 82 | June 18, 2025 | Pittsburgh, Pennsylvania, United States | Cancer |
| Ron Woodbridge; The Searchers | 87 | June 19, 2025 | Edinburgh, Scotland | Undisclosed |
| James Prime; Deacon Blue | 64 | June 19, 2025 | Scotland | Cancer |
| Cavin Yarbrough; Yarbrough and Peoples | 72 | June 19, 2025 | Dallas, Texas, United States | Undisclosed |
| Anne Marie Børud; Norwegian singer | 76 | June 19, 2025 | Arendal, Norway | Undisclosed |
| Geirr Lystrup; Norwegian singer and poet | 76 | June 19, 2025 | Norway | Complications from amyotrophic lateral sclerosis |
| David L. Hamilton; Pavlov's Dog | 74 | June 20, 2025 | Los Angeles, California, United States | Undisclosed |
| Patrick Walden; Babyshambles | 46 | June 20, 2025 | | Undisclosed |
| Rebekah Del Rio; Singer-songwriter and actress | 57 | June 23, 2025 | Los Angeles, California, United States | Undisclosed |
| Feya Faku; South African trumpeter and flugelhornist | 63 | June 23, 2025 | Basel, Switzerland | Undisclosed |
| Yuriy Parfyonov; Russian jazz musician; Auktyon | 79 | June 23, 2025 | Moscow, Russia | Cancer |
| Mick Ralphs; Mott the Hoople, Bad Company | 81 | June 23, 2025 | Henley-on-Thames, Oxfordshire, England | Complications from a stroke |
| Serge Fiori; Harmonium | 73 | June 24, 2025 | Saint-Henri-de-Taillon, Quebec, Canada | Long illness |
| Bobby Sherman; Singer and actor | 81 | June 24, 2025 | Los Angeles, California, United States | Stage 4 cancer |
| Ocasional Talento; Bolivian rapper | 29 | June 26, 2025 | La Paz, Bolivia | Complications from fall |
| Lalo Schifrin; Argentine pianist, composer, arranger and conductor | 93 | June 26, 2025 | Los Angeles, California, United States | Complications from pneumonia |
| Walter Scott; The Whispers | 81 | June 26, 2025 | Los Angeles, California, United States | Cancer |
| Derek A. E. Fuhrmann; Songwriter; The Crash Motive | 44 | June 27, 2025 | Nashville, Tennessee, United States | Cancer |
| Stuart Burrows; Welsh opera singer | 92 | June 29, 2025 | Cardiff, Wales, United Kingdom | Short illness |
| Jimmy Swaggart; Gospel singer and televangelist | 90 | July 1, 2025 | Baton Rouge, Louisiana, United States | Cardiac arrest |
| Hamdan ATT; Indonesian dangdut singer | 78 | July 1, 2025 | Kramat Jati, East Jakarta, Indonesia | Battling various health complications, including stroke and ruptured blood vessels after 8 years |
| Brendan Berg; Canadian indie pop bassist; Royal Canoe | 42 | July 1, 2025 | Highway 10, about three kilometers north of Bowsman, Manitoba, Canada | Car crash |
| Verka Siderova; Bulgarian folk singer | 99 | July 2, 2025 | Dobrich, Bulgaria | Undisclosed |
| Mickey MacConnell; Irish musician and songwriter | 75 | July 3, 2025 | Cork, Ireland | Undisclosed |
| Mark Snow; Film and television composer | 78 | July 4, 2025 | Connecticut, Massachusetts, United States | Undisclosed |
| Luís Jardim; Portuguese pop rock percussionist and bassist | 75 | July 4, 2025 | Vilar, Cadaval, in the Lisbon District, Portugal | Undisclosed; Died on his 75th birthday |
| Young Noble; Outlawz | 47 | July 4, 2025 | Atlanta, Georgia, United States | Suicide by gunshot |
| Antti Tammilehto; Finnish bassist; The Boys, Juice Leskinen | 70 | July 6, 2025 | Helsinki, Finland | Undisclosed |
| Ossi Huber; Austrian singer-songwriter, musician and author | 70 | July 6, 2025 | Klagenfurt am Wörthersee, Austria | Serious illness |
| Mosie Burks; Gospel singer; Mississippi Mass Choir | 92 | July 7, 2025 | Byram, Mississippi, United States | Undisclosed |
| James Carter Cathcart; Voice actor, pianist and vocalist | 71 | July 8, 2025 | New York City, New York, United States | Throat cancer |
| Tim Cronin; Drummer, bass guitarist and lead singer; Monster Magnet | 63 | July 8, 2025 | New Jersey, United States | Amyotrophic lateral sclerosis |
| Ihor Poklad; Ukrainian composer | 83 | July 9, 2025 | Vorzel, Ukraine | Undisclosed |
| Toni Cruz; Spanish singer and television producer; La Trinca | 78 | July 11, 2025 | Greece | Undisclosed |
| Raymond Guiot; French classical and jazz flutist, pianist and composer | 94 | July 11, 2025 | Paris, France | Undisclosed |
| David Kaff; Rare Bird, Spinal Tap | 79 | July 11, 2025 | Folkestone, Kent, England | Undisclosed |
| Iris Williams; Welsh jazz singer | 79 | July 11, 2025 | United States | Undisclosed |
| Dave Cousins; Songwriter and lead singer, Strawbs | 85 | July 13, 2025 | Canterbury, England | Long illness |
| Matt Keil; Bass guitarist, Comeback Kid | 39 | July 14, 2025 | Twin Cities area of Minnesota, United States | Amyotrophic lateral sclerosis |
| Andrea Gibson; Poet and singer | 49 | July 14, 2025 | Boulder, Colorado, United States | Ovarian cancer |
| Billy April; Lead musician, record producer, and songwriter; Driza Bone | 61 | July 15, 2025 | United Kingdom | Short period of illness |
| Connie Francis; Singer and actress | 87 | July 16, 2025 | Pompano Beach, Florida, United States | Pneumonia |
| Gary Karr; Double bassist | 84 | July 16, 2025 | Victoria, British Columbia, Canada | Brain aneurysm |
| Eero Raittinen; The Boys | 80 | July 16, 2025 | Lohja, Finland | Undisclosed |
| Chris Faiumu; New Zealand reggae dub percussionist; Fat Freddy's Drop | 54 | July 16, 2025 | Wellington, New Zealand | Undisclosed |
| Alan Bergman; Composer and songwriter | 99 | July 17, 2025 | Los Angeles, California, United States | Undisclosed |
| Daphne Walker; New Zealand singer | 94 | July 17, 2025 | Christchurch, New Zealand | Undisclosed |
| Robbie Pradlo; City High | 46 | July 17, 2025 | Willingboro, New Jersey, United States | Heart failure |
| Hal Galper; Jazz pianist, composer and bandleader | 87 | July 18, 2025 | Cochecton, New York, United States | Undisclosed |
| Helen Cornelius; Country singer and songwriter | 83 | July 18, 2025 | Monroe City, Missouri, United States | Lengthy illness |
| Roberta Mazzoni Italian singer | 82 | July 18, 2025 | Bologna, Italy | |
| Frank Maffei; Danny & the Juniors | 85 | July 19, 2025 | Primos, Delaware County, Pennsylvania, United States | Undisclosed |
| Béatrice Uria-Monzon; French mezzo-soprano | 61 | July 19, 2025 | Agen, France | Undisclosed |
| Owen Gray; Jamaican reggae musician | 86 | July 20, 2025 | London, England | Undisclosed |
| Preta Gil; Brazilian singer-songwriter, actress, and businesswoman | 50 | July 20, 2025 | New York City, New York, United States | Complications from colorectal cancer |
| Eamon Downes; Liquid | 56 | July 21, 2025 | Italy | Brain cancer |
| Chuck Mangione; Jazz flugelhornist, trumpeter and composer | 84 | July 22, 2025 | Rochester, New York, United States | Natural causes |
| George Kooymans; Golden Earring | 77 | July 22, 2025 | Rijkevorsel, Belgium | Amyotrophic lateral sclerosis |
| John Palmer; Family, Blossom Toes, Bakerloo | 82 | July 22, 2025 | Brentwood, Essex, United States | Undisclosed |
| Ozzy Osbourne; Black Sabbath | 76 | July 22, 2025 | Jordans, Buckinghamshire, England | Heart attack |
| Marco Dionigi Italian disc jockey and musician | 56 | July 22, 2025 | Verona, Italy | |
| Tommy McLain; Swamp pop musician | 85 | July 24, 2025 | Hessmer, Louisiana, United States | Undisclosed |
| George Veikoso; Fijian ska and reggae singer | 55 | July 24, 2025 | Suva, Fiji | Undisclosed |
| Amalia Macías; Mexican singer and actress | 91 | July 24, 2025 | Mexico | Undisclosed |
| Cleo Laine; Jazz singer and actress | 97 | July 24, 2025 | Wavendon, England | Undisclosed |
| Obafemi Lasode; Nigerian musician, film director and producer | 69 | July 25, 2025 | Lagos, Nigeria | Protracted illness |
| Daddy Lumba; Ghanaian singer-songwriter | 60 | July 26, 2025 | Accra, Ghana | Brief illness |
| Jock McDonald; Bollock Brothers | 69 | July 26, 2025 | Bundoran, Ireland | Drowned |
| Ziad Rahbani; Lebanese composer and pianist | 69 | July 26, 2025 | Beirut, Lebanon | Undisclosed |
| Tom Lehrer; Singer and songwriter | 97 | July 26, 2025 | Cambridge, Massachusetts, United States | Natural causes |
| Celso Valli; Songwriter, arranger and producer | 75 | July 27, 2025 | Bologna, Italy | Undisclosed |
| Livio Macchia; I Camaleonti | 83 | July 29, 2025 | Melendugno, Italy | Undisclosed |
| Paul Mario Day; Iron Maiden, More, The Sweet | 69 | July 29, 2025 | Newcastle, New South Wales, Australia | Cancer |
| Flaco Jiménez; Texas Tornados, Los Super Seven | 86 | July 31, 2025 | San Antonio, Texas, United States | Undisclosed |
| Jesto; Italian rapper | 40 | July 31, 2025 | Rome, Italy | Heart attack |
| Jeannie Seely; Country singer | 85 | August 1, 2025 | Hermitage, Tennessee, United States | Complications from an intestinal infection |
| Erik Wunder; Cobalt, Man's Gin | 42 | August 1, 2025 | | Heart failure |
| David Roach; Junkyard | 59 | August 1, 2025 | Omaha, Nebraska, United States | Cancer |
| Howie Tee; Hip-hop DJ and record producer | 61 | August 2, 2025 | United States | Undisclosed |
| Larry Gillstrom; Kick Axe | 68 | August 4, 2025 | United States | Cancer |
| Jane Morgan; Singer and actress | 101 | August 4, 2025 | Naples, Florida, US | Natural causes |
| Terry Reid; English rock singer-songwriter and guitarist | 75 | August 4, 2025 | Rancho Mirage, California, United States | Cancer |
| Col Joye; Australian singer-songwriter and Business manager for Bee Gees, Andy Gibb | 89 | August 5, 2025 | Sydney, New South Wales, Australia | Undisclosed |
| Nancy King; Jazz singer | 85 | August 5, 2025 | Portland, Oregon, United States | Undisclosed |
| Lee Min; As One | 46 | August 5, 2025 | Seoul, Korea | Undisclosed |
| Eddie Palmieri; Jazz pianist, composer and bandleader | 88 | August 6, 2025 | Hackensack, New Jersey, United States | Undisclosed |
| Arlindo Cruz; Brazilian singer-songwriter and samba musician; Fundo de Quintal | 66 | August 8, 2025 | Rio de Janeiro, State of Rio de Janeiro, Brazil | Pneumonia |
| Robert Jaramillo; Cannibal & the Headhunters | 78 | August 8, 2025 | Pueblo, Colorado, United States | Undisclosed |
| NoB; Marked-Up, Project.R | 61 | August 9, 2025 | Japan | Kidney cancer |
| Graham Fenton; Matchbox | 76 | August 10, 2025 | United Kingdom | Undisclosed |
| Bobby Whitlock; Derek and the Dominos, Delaney & Bonnie and Friends | 77 | August 10, 2025 | Austin, Texas, United States | Cancer |
| Chuck Girard; The Castells, The Hondells, Love Song | 81 | August 11, 2025 | California, United States | Cancer |
| Sheila Jordan; Jazz singer | 96 | August 11, 2025 | New York City, New York, United States | Undisclosed |
| Gabi Novak; Croatian singer | 89 | August 11, 2025 | Zagreb, Croatia | Pneumonia |
| Cool John Ferguson; Blues musician | 71 | August 12, 2025 | Beaufort, South Carolina, United States | Undisclosed |
| Klaus Wirzenius; Finnish Singer, Anthriel | 37 | August 13, 2025 | Tampella, Tampere, Finland | Drowned |
| Roy Estrada; The Mothers of Invention, Little Feat, The Magic Band | 82 | August 14, 2025 | Conroe, Texas, United States | Undisclosed; died while serving time for multiple sex offences. |
| Jamshied Sharifi; Composer, musician, and record producer | 64 | August 15, 2025 | New York City, United States | Cancer |
| Pippo Baudo Italian television host, television author and radio host | 89 | August 16, 2025 | Rome, Italy | Sudden heart problem |
| Aesop the Black Wolf; Living Legends | 51 | August 17, 2025 | California, United States | Undisclosed |
| Joe Hickerson; Folk singer | 89 | August 17, 2025 | Portland, Oregon, United States | Undisclosed |
| Banu Kırbağ; Turkish singer | 74 | August 18, 2025 | Istanbul, Turkey | Natural causes |
| Park In soo Korean soul singer | 77 | August 18, 2025 | Seoul, South Korea | Pneumonia |
| Luz; Japanese singer | 32 | August 19, 2025 | Japan | Undisclosed |
| Michael Antunes; John Cafferty and the Beaver Brown Band, Ernie and the Automatics | 85 | August 19, 2025 | New Bedford, Massachusetts, United States | Kidney failure |
| Brent Hinds; Mastodon | 51 | August 20, 2025 | Atlanta, Georgia, United States | Motorcycle accident |
| Salvador Aguilar; Lead Mexican singer of Coda | 56 | August 21, 2025 | Mexico City, Mexico | Stomach cancer |
| Stanisław Sojka; Polish jazz and pop musician and composer | 66 | August 21, 2025 | Sopot, Poland | Health complications including long-standing battles with type 2 diabetes and chronic obstructive pulmonary disease |
| Jan Erik Berntsen; Norwegian actor and singer | 80 | August 21, 2025 | Norway | Undisclosed |
| Marjorie “Margie” Latzko; The Chordettes | 96 | August 22, 2025 | Saratoga Springs, New York, US | Undisclosed |
| Yaroslav Yevdokimov; Ukrainian-born Belarusian singer | 78 | August 22, 2025 | Minsk, Belarus | Lung cancer |
| Tom Shipley; Brewer & Shipley | 84 | August 24, 2025 | Columbia, Missouri, United States | Undisclosed |
| Rogério Meanda; Blitz | 61 | August 25, 2025 | Botafogo, Rio de Janeiro, Brazil | Undisclosed |
| Nisse Karlén; Sacramentum | 50 | August 25, 2025 | Sweden | Suicide |
| Manuel de la Calva; Dúo Dinámico | 88 | August 26, 2025 | Madrid, Spain | Pulmonary fibrosis |
| Joe Rivers; Johnnie & Joe | 88 | August 26, 2025 | Suffern, New York, United States | Undisclosed |
| Jim Kimball; Laughing Hyenas, Mule, The Jesus Lizard, The Denison/Kimball Trio | 59 | August 27, 2025 | Chicago, Illinois, United States | Undisclosed |
| Jürgen Bartsch; Bethlehem | 62 | August 27, 2025 | Germany | Long illness |
| Ray Mayhew; Sigue Sigue Sputnik | 60 | August 28, 2025 | United Kingdom | Undisclosed |
| Gary Didier Perez; Haitian singer-songwriter | 59 | August 28, 2025 | Hamilton, New Jersey, United States | Undisclosed |
| Tuuttimörkö; Finnish rapper, music producer and DJ | 37 | August 29, 2025 | Hauho, Finland | Undisclosed |
| Juhani Markola; Finnish singer | 83 | August 30, 2025 | Jyväskylä, Finland | Undisclosed |
| Cristina Jorio; Italian singer | 97 | September 1, 2025 | Alfonsine, Ravenna, Italy | Undisclosed |
| Ted Robert; Swiss singer-songwriter | 81 | September 3, 2025 | Orbe, Switzerland | Liver disease |
| Robby Turner; Pedal steel guitarist and music producer for Waylon Jennings, Lynyrd Skynyrd | 63 | September 4, 2025 | Hermitage, Tennessee, United States | Undisclosed |
| Pia Velsi; Italian actress and singer | 101 | September 4, 2025 | Rome, Italy | Undisclosed |
| Bruce Loose; Flipper | 66 | September 5, 2025 | Humboldt County, California, United States | Heart attack |
| Mark Volman; The Turtles, The Mothers of Invention, Flo & Eddie | 78 | September 5, 2025 | Nashville, Tennessee, United States | Brief illness |
| Rick Davies; Supertramp | 81 | September 6, 2025 | Long Island, New York, United States | Multiple myeloma |
| Atomic Steif; Sodom | 57 | September 6, 2025 | | Undisclosed |
| Allen Blickle; Baroness | 42 | September 7, 2025 | United States | Undisclosed |
| Angela Ro Ro; Brazilian singer-songwriter | 75 | September 8, 2025 | Rio de Janeiro, State of Rio de Janeiro, Brazil | Natural causes |
| Allan Cole; Songwriter for Bob Marley | 74 | September 9, 2025 | Boca Raton, Florida, United States | Undisclosed |
| Bobby Hart; Boyce and Hart | 86 | September 10, 2025 | Los Angeles, California, United States | Long illness |
| Yu Menglong; Chinese actor and singer | 37 | September 11, 2025 | Chaoyang, Beijing, China | Fall from an apartment |
| Nicky Ryan; Producer for Enya | 79 | September 11, 2025 | Dublin, Ireland | Undisclosed |
| Viv Prince; Pretty Things, The Jeff Beck Group | 84 | September 11, 2025 | Faro, Portugal | Undisclosed |
| Andreas Martin; German schlager singer | 72 | September 13, 2025 | Neunkirchen, North Rhine-Westphalia, Germany | Undisclosed |
| Stephen Luscombe; Blancmange | 70 | September 13, 2025 | England | Undisclosed |
| Farida Parveen; Bangladeshi folk singer | 70 | September 13, 2025 | Dhaka, Bangladesh | Undisclosed |
| Hermeto Pascoal; Brazilian multi-instrumentalist | 89 | September 13, 2025 | Rio de Janeiro, Brazil | Multiple organ failure |
| Joel Moss; Music producer, engineer and mixer | 79 | September 15, 2025 | Saratoga Springs, New York, United States | Aortic dissection |
| Omen; Music producer | 49 | September 15, 2025 | Harlem, New York City, United States | Undisclosed |
| Tomas Lindberg; At the Gates | 52 | September 16, 2025 | Gothenburg, Sweden | Cancer |
| Fausto Amodei; Italian folk singer-songwriter and musicologist | 79 | September 18, 2025 | Turin, Italy | Undisclosed |
| Diane Martel; Music video director and choreographer | 63 | September 18, 2025 | Manhattan, New York City, United States | Breast cancer |
| Brett James; Country singer-songwriter and record producer | 57 | September 18, 2025 | somewhere near Franklin, North Carolina, United States | Plane crash |
| Sonny Curtis; The Crickets | 88 | September 19, 2025 | Nashville, Tennessee, United States | Pneumonia |
| Chris Doheny; Geisha | 64 | September 19, 2025 | Kapunda, South Australia, Australia | Car crash |
| Zubeen Garg; Assamese, Bengali and Hindi singer, lyricist and producer | 52 | September 19, 2025 | Singapore, Singapore | Scuba diving accident |
| JD Twitch; Optimo | 57 | September 19, 2025 | Glasgow, Scotland | Brain tumor |
| Mike Wofford; Jazz pianist | 87 | September 19, 2025 | San Diego, California, United States | Undisclosed |
| Ron Carroll; DJ, singer and music producer | 57 | September 21, 2025 | Chicago, Illinois, United States | Heart attack |
| Danny Thompson; Pentangle | 86 | September 23, 2025 | Rickmansworth, Hertfordshire, England | Undisclosed |
| Chris Dreja; The Yardbirds | 79 | September 25, 2025 | London, England | Long illness |
| Güllü; Turkish singer | 51 | September 26, 2025 | Yalova, Turkey | Accidental fall from a balcony at her apartment |
| Christian; Italian singer | 82 | September 26, 2025 | Policlinico of Milan, Milan, Italy | Cerebral hemorrhage |
| Jim McNeely; Jazz composer, arranger and pianist | 76 | September 26, 2025 | New York City, New York, United States | Undisclosed |
| Dave Benton; Spooner | 77 | September 27, 2025 | Madison, Wisconsin, United States | Sarcoma |
| Pablo Guerrero; Spanish singer-songwriter | 78 | September 30, 2025 | Madrid, Spain | Undisclosed |
| Bohdan Bohach; Pikkardiyska Tertsiya | 50 | October 1, 2025 | Lviv, Ukraine | Undisclosed |
| Chhannulal Mishra; Indian Hindustani classical singer | 89 | October 2, 2025 | Mirzapur, India | Prolonged illness |
| Stephen Caldwell; The Orlons | 82 | October 2, 2025 | Philadelphia, Pennsylvania, United States | Bone cancer |
| Patricia Routledge; Actress and singer | 96 | October 3, 2025 | Chichester, England | Undisclosed |
| Paul Van Bruystegem; Triggerfinger | 66 | October 4, 2025 | Lier, Flanders, Belgium | Long illness |
| Ike Turner Jr. Music producer for his father; Ike Turner | 67 | October 4, 2025 | Los Angeles, California, United States | Kidney cancer |
| Halid Bešlić; Bosnian-Croatian folk singer | 71 | October 7, 2025 | Sarajevo, Bosnia | Kidney cancer |
| Ian Freebairn-Smith; Arranger and composer | 93 | October 7, 2025 | Folsom, California, United States | Undisclosed |
| Rajvir Jawanda; Indian Punjabi singer and actor | 35 | October 8, 2025 | Mohali, Punjab, India | Motorcycle accident |
| Terry "Buzzy" Johnson; The Flamingos | 86 | October 8, 2025 | Las Vegas, Nevada, United States | Undisclosed |
| Ace Finchum; Tigertailz, Marseille, Tokyo Blade | 64 | October 8, 2025 | Los Angeles, California, United States | Undisclosed |
| Niyazi Sayın; Turkish ney flautist | 98 | October 8, 2025 | Istanbul, Turkey | Undisclosed |
| Fede Dorcaz; Argentine singer and model | 29 | October 9, 2025 | Mexico City, Mexico | Murdered in attempted robbery |
| Efrem Amiramov; Russian singer | 69 | October 9, 2025 | Nalchik, Kabardino-Balkaria, Russia | Natural causes |
| John Lodge; The Moody Blues | 82 | October 10, 2025 | Naples, Florida, United States | Undisclosed |
| Thommy Price; Billy Idol, Blue Öyster Cult, Joan Jett and the Blackhearts, Scandal | 68 | October 10, 2025 | New York City, United States | Undisclosed |
| Ian Watkins; Lostprophets | 48 | October 11, 2025 | HMP Wakefield, West Yorkshire, England | Murdered while serving time for multiple sex offences |
| Matt Tolfrey; DJ, producer and record label owner | 44 | October 13, 2025 | United Kingdom | Undisclosed |
| Richard Addrisi; Addrisi Brothers | 84 | October 14, 2025 | Miami, Florida, United States | Undisclosed |
| D'Angelo; Neo-soul singer-songwriter | 51 | October 14, 2025 | New York City, New York, United States | Pancreatic cancer |
| Klaus Doldinger; German jazz saxophonist and composer | 89 | October 16, 2025 | Icking, Germany | Undisclosed |
| Ace Frehley; Kiss, Frehley's Comet | 74 | October 16, 2025 | Morristown, New Jersey, United States | Brain bleed after a fall |
| Bob Franke; Folk singer-songwriter | 78 | October 16, 2025 | Antigua, Guatemala | Heart attack |
| Jack White; German music producer | 85 | October 16, 2025 | Berlin, Germany | Undisclosed |
| Sam Rivers; Limp Bizkit | 48 | October 18, 2025 | Florida, United States | Cardiac arrest |
| Dave Burgess; The Champs | 90 | October 19, 2025 | Dover, Tennessee, United States | Undisclosed |
| Anthony Jackson; Jazz bassist | 73 | October 19, 2025 | New York City, United States | Undisclosed |
| Davey Langit; Filipino singer-songwriter | 38 | October 21, 2025 | Manila, Philippines | Spondylodiscitis |
| Dionysis Savvopoulos; Greek singer-songwriter | 80 | October 21, 2025 | Athens, Greece | Cancer |
| David Ball; Soft Cell, The Grid | 66 | October 22, 2025 | London, England | Undisclosed |
| Marcie Free; King Kobra, Unruly Child | 71 | October 24, 2025 | Ypsilanti, Michigan, United States | Undisclosed |
| Jack DeJohnette; Jazz drummer | 83 | October 26, 2025 | Kingston, New York, United States | Congestive heart failure |
| Vivian Jones; Jamaican-born British reggae singer | 68 | October 27, 2025 | Trelawny, Jamaica | Undisclosed |
| Andrew Metcalfe; Sound of Guns | 42 | October 29, 2025 | Wallasey, Wirral, England | Undisclosed |
| Kostas Smoriginas; Lithuanian musician, cinema and theatre director and member of Aktorių Trio | 72 | October 29, 2025 | Vilnius, Lithuania | |
| Scott Sorry; Amen, The Wildhearts, Sorry and the Sinatras, Brides of Destruction | 47 | October 30, 2025 | Gorham, Maine, United States | Glioblastoma |
| Ray Drummond; Jazz bassist, composer and bandleader | 78 | November 1, 2025 | Teaneck, New Jersey, United States | Undisclosed |
| Archie Fisher; Scottish folk singer and songwriter | 86 | November 1, 2025 | Scotland | Undisclosed |
| Young Bleed; Rapper | 51 | November 1, 2025 | Las Vegas, Nevada, United States | Brain aneurysm |
| Joseph Byrd; The United States of America | 87 | November 2, 2025 | Medford, Oregon, United States | Undisclosed |
| Donna Jean Godchaux; Grateful Dead | 78 | November 2, 2025 | Nashville, Tennessee, United States | Cancer |
| Thomas Klein; Warrant | 59 | November 2, 2025 | Germany | Undisclosed |
| Jim Self; Tubist and composer | 82 | November 2, 2025 | Los Angeles, California, United States | Undisclosed |
| Lô Borges; Brazilian singer-songwriter and guitarist | 73 | November 3, 2025 | Belo Horizonte, Brazil | Complications from prescription drug poisoning |
| Victor Conte; Pure Food and Drug Act, Tower of Power; businessman founder of BALCO | 75 | November 3, 2025 | San Mateo, California, United States | Pancreatic cancer |
| Robert Taylor; Dragon | 74 | November 4, 2025 | Sydney, New South Wales, Australia | Undisclosed |
| Gilson Lavis; Squeeze, Jools Holland and his Rhythm & Blues Orchestra | 74 | November 5, 2025 | Lincolnshire, England | Undisclosed |
| Peppe Vessicchio Italian conductor and arranger | 69 | November 8, 2025 | Rome, Italy | Interstitial pneumonia |
| Richard Darbyshire; Living in a Box | 65 | November 10, 2025 | United Kingdom | Undisclosed |
| Cleto Escobedo III; Saxophonist and band leader | 59 | November 11, 2025 | Los Angeles, California, United States | Cardiogenic shock caused by a liver transplant |
| Todd Snider; Alt-country singer-songwriter | 59 | November 14, 2025 | Nashville, Tennessee, United States | Undisclosed |
| Hilly Michaels; Sparks | 77 | November 15, 2025 | New Haven, Connecticut, United States | Undisclosed |
| Maxon Margiela; American rapper | 21 | November 16, 2025 | Orlando, Florida, United States | Suicide |
| Humane Sagar; Indian playback singer | 34 | November 17, 2025 | Bhubaneswar, India | Liver cancer |
| Jards Macalé; Brazilian singer-songwriter | 82 | November 17, 2025 | Rio de Janeiro, Brazil | Cardiac arrest |
| Kessler Twins; Singers, dancers, and actresses | 89 | November 17, 2025 | Grünwald, Bavaria, Germany | Assisted suicide |
| Mani; The Stone Roses, Primal Scream | 63 | November 20, 2025 | Heaton Moor, Stockport, England | Undisclosed |
| Jean Guidoni; French singer and songwriter | 74 | November 21, 2025 | Bordeaux, France | A sudden illness |
| Jellybean Johnson; The Time | 69 | November 21, 2025 | Robbinsdale, Minnesota, United States | Undisclosed |
| René Karst; Dutch singer | 59 | November 21, 2025 | Hoogeveen, Netherlands | Cardiac arrest |
| Ornella Vanoni; Italian singer | 91 | November 21, 2025 | Milan, Italy | Cardiac arrest |
| Ian Lees; Moving Pictures | 70 | November 23, 2025 | Central Coast of New South Wales, Australia | Heart attack |
| Jimmy Cliff; Reggae singer | 81 | November 24, 2025 | Kingston, Jamaica | Pneumonia |
| Sara Surkamp; Pavlov's Dog | 72 | November 25, 2025 | St. Louis, Missouri, United States | Cancer |
| Judy Cheeks; The Ikettes | 71 | November 26, 2025 | Texas, United States | Undisclosed |
| Justin Baren; The Redwalls | 40 | November 28, 2025 | Rapid City, South Dakota, United States | Undisclosed |
| Poorstacy; Rapper | 26 | November 29, 2025 | Boca Raton, Florida, United States | Suicide by gunshot |
| Bob "Bongo Starr" Starkie; Skyhooks | 73 | November 29, 2025 | Melbourne, Australia | Leukemia |
| Chubby Tavares; Tavares | 80 | November 29, 2025 | New Bedford, Massachusett, United States | Undisclosed |
| Warren Williams; Australian rock musician | 85 | November 30, 2025 | Australia | Undisclosed |
| Dag Spantell; Norwegian singer | 75 | November 30, 2025 | Oslo, Norway | Cancer |
| Billy Nichols; Musician and songwriter | 85 | November 30, 2025 | Atlantic City, New Jersey, United States | Brief illness |
| Steve Cropper; Booker T. & the M.G.'s, The Mar-Keys, The Blues Brothers Band | 84 | December 3, 2025 | Nashville, Tennessee, United States | Undisclosed |
| Alistair Coakley; Guitarist for Clout, Mango Groove, Stimela, Hotline | | December 3, 2025 | South Africa | Undisclosed |
| Ted Egan; Australian folk singer and civil servant | 93 | December 4, 2025 | Alice Springs, Australia | Undisclosed |
| Tetsu Yamauchi; Free, Faces | 79 | December 4, 2025 | Japan | Undisclosed |
| Sandro Giacobbe; Italian singer-songwriter | 75 | December 5, 2025 | Cogorno, Italy | Cancer |
| Camryn Magness; Singer and musician | 26 | December 5, 2025 | Fort Myers, Florida, United States | Struck by a vehicle while riding an electric scooter |
| Rory MacLeod; Bassist for Roomful of Blues | 70 | December 6, 2025 | Providence, Rhode Island, United States | Struck by a vehicle while walking his dogs. |
| Bernie Toorish; The Four Lads | 94 | December 7, 2025 | North Olmsted, Ohio, United States | Undisclosed |
| Raul Malo; The Mavericks | 60 | December 8, 2025 | Nashville, Tennessee, United States | Intestinal cancer |
| Zafer Dilek; Turkish guitarist and arranger | 81 | December 11, 2025 | Istanbul, Turkey | Undisclosed |
| Manny Guerra; Sunny and the Sunglows, Selena | 85 | December 12, 2025 | Las Vegas, Nevada, United States | Cancer |
| Magda Umer; Polish singer-songwriter | 76 | December 12, 2025 | Warsaw, Poland | Undisclosed |
| Tonny Eyk; Dutch composer and musician | 85 | December 13, 2025 | Badhoevedorp, Netherlands | A short illness |
| Abraham Quintanilla; Musician and talent manager and father of Selena | 86 | December 13, 2025 | Corpus Christi, Texas, United States | Undisclosed |
| Carl Carlton; R&B, funk and soul singer-songwriter | 72 | December 14, 2025 | Detroit, Michigan, United States | Stroke |
| Joe Ely; The Flatlanders | 78 | December 15, 2025 | Taos, New Mexico, United States | Complications from Lewy body dementia, Parkinson's disease and pneumonia |
| Mick Abrahams; Jethro Tull, Blodwyn Pig | 82 | December 19, 2025 | Luton, Bedforshire, England | Undisclosed |
| Michał Urbaniak; Polish jazz musician | 82 | December 20, 2025 | Warsaw, Poland | Undisclosed |
| Chris Rea; Singer-songwriter | 74 | December 22, 2025 | Berkshire, England | Complications from stroke |
| Ray Lynch; Musician | 82 | December 22, 2025 | California, United States | Complications from a fall |
| Jack Pedler; Teenage Head | 72 | December 23, 2025 | Hamilton, Ontario, Canada | Undisclosed |
| Perry Bamonte; The Cure | 65 | December 24, 2025 | England | Short illness |
| Howie Klein; Record executive and DJ | 77 | December 24, 2025 | Los Angeles, California, United States | Pancreatic cancer |
| Don Bryant; R&B singer-songwriter | 83 | December 26, 2025 | Memphis, Tennessee, United States | Undisclosed |
| Pate Mustajärvi; Popeda | 69 | December 26, 2025 | Finland | Undisclosed |
| Fanny; French singer | 46 | December 27, 2025 | Sète, Hérault, France | Cancer |
| Gary Graffman; Classical pianist | 97 | December 27, 2025 | New York City, New York, United States | Undisclosed |
| Andy “Ms Zsa Zsa Poltergeist” Billups; The Hamsters | 72 | December 28, 2025 | Worthing, Sussex, England | Undisclosed |
| Michael Lippman; Manager for David Bowie, George Michael, Matchbox Twenty | 79 | December 29, 2025 | Santa Ynez, California, United States | Undisclosed |
| Richard Smallwood; Gospel singer | 77 | December 30, 2025 | Sandy Spring, Maryland, United States | Kidney failure |

== See also ==
- List of deaths in popular music
- List of murdered hip hop musicians
- 27 Club
