= List of 2026 deaths in popular music =

This is a list of notable performers of rock music and other forms of popular music, and others directly associated with the music as producers, songwriters, or in other closely related roles, who died in 2026.

== 2026 deaths in popular music ==
Preceded by 2025	List of deaths in popular music 2026	Succeeded by —

Name	Age	Date	Location of death	Cause of death
Tony Carr; CCS, Hot Chocolate	98	January 2, 2026	London, England, U.K.	Undisclosed
Johnny Legend; Rockabilly musician	77	January 2, 2026	Newport, Oregon, U.S.	Complications from stroke and heart failure
Rolf Riehm; German composer	88	January 3, 2026	Germany	Undisclosed
Calbo; Ärsenik	52	January 4, 2026	Lyon, France	Undisclosed
Andrew Bodnar; The Rumour	71	January 5, 2026	North Yorkshire, England, U.K.	Liver cancer
Jim McBride; Country music songwriter	78	January 7, 2026	Huntsville, Alabama, U.S.	Complications from a fall
Guy Moon; American composer	63	January 8, 2026	Los Angeles, California, U.S.	Hit by a car while riding a scooter
Terry Sullivan; Renaissance	87	January 9, 2026	Lymington, England	Short illness
Ted Nichols; American composer	97	January 9, 2026	Auburn, Washington, U.S.	Complications from Alzheimer's disease
Yeison Jiménez; Colombian singer	34	January 10, 2026	Paipa, Colombia	Plane crash
Bob Weir; Grateful Dead	78	January 10, 2026	Mill Valley, California, U.S.	Cancer and lung issues
John Wallace; Trumpet player and composer	76	January 11, 2026	Glasgow, Scotland	Cancer
John Forté; Refugee Camp All-Stars; producer for Fugees	50	January 12, 2026	Chilmark, Massachusetts, U.S.	Complications from the flu
Matt Kwasniewski-Kelvin; Black Midi	26	January 12, 2026	London, England, U.K.	Suicide
Kenny Morris; Siouxsie and the Banshees	68	January 15, 2026	Cork, Ireland	Undisclosed
Tony Dallara; Italian singer and actor	89	January 16, 2026	Milan, Italy	Undisclosed
Tucker Zimmerman; American singer-songwriter	84	January 17, 2026	Saint-Georges-sur-Meuse, Belgium	Asphyxiated in a house fire
Stephen "Cat" Coore; Third World	69	January 18, 2026	Jamaica	Undisclosed
Ralph Towner; Oregon	85	January 18, 2026	Rome, Italy	Undisclosed
Anders Möller; Black Ingvars, Swedish Erotica	63	January 19, 2026	Gothenburg, Sweden	Cancer
Billy Parker; American country music singer and DJ	88	January 19, 2026	Tulsa, Oklahoma, U.S.	Undisclosed
Rob Hirst; Midnight Oil, Backsliders, Ghostwriters	70	January 20, 2026	New South Wales, Australia	Pancreatic cancer
Wolfgang Heichel; Dschinghis Khan	75	January 20, 2026	Germany	Undisclosed
Yaw Sarpong; Ghanaian gospel musician and songwriter	66	January 20, 2026	Kumasi, Ghana	Undisclosed
Francis Buchholz; Scorpions, Dawn Road, Michael Schenker's Temple of Rock	71	January 22, 2026	Hanover, Germany	Cancer
Guy Hovis; American singer	84	January 22, 2026	Oxford, Mississippi, U.S.	Undisclosed
Margaret Ross; The Cookies	83	January 23, 2026	New York, New York, U.S.	Undisclosed
Jean Cussac; French baritone and music director	103	January 25, 2026	La Teste-de-Buch, France	Undisclosed
Gabe Lopez; American pop-rock singer-songwriter and producer	49	January 25, 2026		Lymphoma
Abhijit Majumdar; Indian composer and music director	54	January 25, 2026	Bhubaneswar, Odisha, India	Liver disease
Richie Beirach; American jazz pianist	78	January 26, 2026	Worms, Germany	Undisclosed
Sly Dunbar; Sly and Robbie	73	January 26, 2026	Kingston, Jamaica	Cancer
António Chainho; Portuguese fado guitarist	88	January 27, 2026	Amadora, Portugal	Undisclosed
Mingo Lewis; Santana, Al Di Meola, The Tubes	72	January 27, 2026	Vallejo, California, United States	Undisclosed
Bryan Loren; American singer-songwriter and record producer	59	January 28, 2026	Los Angeles, California, U.S.	Undisclosed
Angelo Foletto; Italian music critic and musicologist	76	January 29, 2026	Milan, Italy	Undisclosed
Abdelhadi Belkhayat; Moroccan singer	85	January 30, 2026	Rabat, Morocco	Prolonged illness
Parthenon Huxley; ELO Part II, The Orchestra	70	January 30, 2026	Chevy Chase, Maryland, U.S.	Natural causes
Miklós Fenyő; Hungária	78	January 31, 2026	Budapest, Hungary	Pneumonia
Billy Bass Nelson; Funkadelic, Parliament-Funkadelic	75	January 31, 2026	Plainfield, New Jersey, U.S.	Natural causes
Steve Washington; Slave, Aurra	67	February 1, 2026	Newark, New Jersey, United States	Undisclosed
James Moschello; The Elegants	88	February 2, 2026	Staten Island, New York, U.S.	Undisclosed
Chuck Negron; Three Dog Night	83	February 2, 2026	Los Angeles, California, U.S.	Heart failure and COPD
Ken Peplowski; Jazz clarinetist and tenor saxophonist	66	February 2, 2026	On a cruise ship in the Gulf of Mexico	Undisclosed
Yuan Wei-jen; Taiwanese singer-songwriter and record producer	57	February 2, 2026	Taitung, Taiwan	Pneumonia
Lamonte McLemore; The 5th Dimension	90	February 3, 2026	Las Vegas, Nevada, U.S.	Undisclosed
Tommy Crook; American guitarist	81	February 4, 2026	Tulsa, Oklahoma, U.S.	Undisclosed
Greg Brown; Cake	56	February 5, 2026		Brief illness
Helen Micallef; Helen and Joseph	75	February 5, 2026	Valletta, Malta	Undisclosed
Fred Smith; Television, Blondie	77	February 5, 2026	New York, New York, U.S.	Cancer
Mr. Complex; Polyrhythm Addicts	56	February 6, 2026	New York, United States	Undisclosed
Lynn Blakey; Tres Chicas	63	February 6, 2026	Chapel Hill, North Carolina, United States	Undisclosed
Brad Arnold; 3 Doors Down	47	February 7, 2026	Meridian, Mississippi, U.S.	Renal cell carcinoma
Matti Caspi; Israeli singer	76	February 7, 2026	Tel Aviv, Israel	Cancer
Ebo Taylor; Ghanaian guitarist	90	February 7, 2026	Saltpond, Ghana	Undisclosed
Garland Green; American soul singer and pianist	83	February 9, 2026		Undisclosed
Andrew Ranken; The Pogues	72	February 10, 2026		Undisclosed
Jerry Kennedy; American record producer, songwriter and guitarist	85	February 11, 2026	Nashville, Tennessee, U.S.	Undisclosed
Milkman; Mexican rapper, producer, and composer	36	February 12, 2026	Mexico	Undisclosed
Simon Harris; English DJ and producer	63	February 13, 2026	London, England, U.K.	Undisclosed
Wayne Proctor; We the People	78	February 13, 2026	Anderson, South Carolina, United States	Undisclosed
Tim Very; Manchester Orchestra	42	February 14, 2026		Undisclosed
Anna Ranalli; Italian model, actress, and singer	84	February 14, 2026	Martinsicuro, Italy	Undisclosed
Billy Steinberg; American songwriter	75	February 16, 2026	Brentwood, California, U.S.	Cancer
Shinya; Luna Sea	56	February 17, 2026	Tokyo, Japan	Colorectal cancer
Lil Poppa; American rapper	25	February 18, 2026	Fulton County, Georgia, U.S.	Suicide by gunshot
Angela Luce; Italian singer and actress	87	February 20, 2026	Naples, Italy	Heart failure
John Hannah; Streetheart	73	February 20, 2026	Ayr, Scotland, U.K.	Undisclosed
Willie Colón; American salsa musician	75	February 21, 2026	New York, New York, U.S.	Respiratory failure
Mark Kennedy; Spectrum, Ayers Rock, Marcia Hines	74	February 21, 2026	Clayton, Victoria, Australia	Undisclosed
Luci4; American rapper	23	February 22, 2026	Los Angeles, California, U.S.	Fentanyl overdose
Éliane Radigue; French composer	94	February 23, 2026	Paris, France	Complications from a fall
Monti Rock III; American singer, member of Disco-Tex and the Sex-O-Lettes	86	February 23, 2026	Las Vegas, Nevada, U.S.	Complications from COPD
Roscoe Robinson; Gospel and soul singer	97	February 26, 2026	Birmingham, Alabama, U.S.	Undisclosed
Neil Sedaka; American singer-songwriter, member of The Tokens	86	February 27, 2026	Los Angeles, California, U.S.	Undisclosed
Travis Wammack; American rock and roll guitarist	81	February 27, 2026	Alabama, U.S.	Undisclosed
Terry Watkinson; Max Webster	85	February 28, 2026		Undisclosed
John P. Hammond; Blues guitarist and singer	83	February 28, 2026	Jersey City, New Jersey, U.S.	Undisclosed
Bob Power; American record producer, audio engineer, composer, and performer	73	March 1, 2026		Undisclosed
Gary Walker; The Walker Brothers, The Standells	83	March 1, 2026	Essex, England, U.K.	Complications from a stroke
Len Garry; The Quarrymen	84	March 2, 2026	Liverpool, England, U.K.	Pneumonia
Mike Vernon; English record producer and music executive	81	March 2, 2026	Andalusia, Spain	Undisclosed
Roy Book Binder; American folk and blues musician	82	March 3, 2026	St. Petersburg, Florida, United States	Undisclosed
Lee Turner; The Dream Weavers	89	March 5, 2026	Jacksonville, Florida, U.S.	Undisclosed
Franco Vito Gaiezza; Italian musician, composer and writer	63	March 6, 2026	Parma, Italy	Undisclosed
Vidi Aldiano; Indonesian singer-songwriter	35	March 7, 2026	Jakarta, Indonesia	Kidney cancer
David Brigati; Joey Dee and the Starliters, The Rascals	85	March 7, 2026	Montville, New Jersey, U.S.	Undisclosed
Donny Fattah; God Bless	75	March 7, 2026	Jakarta, Indonesia	Sarcopenia, vascular blockage, and autoimmune diseases
Dilworth Karaka; Herbs	75	March 7, 2026	New Zealand	Undisclosed
Walter Martino; Goblin	72	March 7, 2026	Livorno, Italy	Undisclosed
Country Joe McDonald; Country Joe and the Fish	84	March 7, 2026	Berkeley, California, U.S.	Complications from Parkinson's disease
Augie Meyers; Sir Douglas Quintet, Texas Tornados	85	March 7, 2026	Bulverde, Texas, U.S.	Undisclosed
Zeph Ellis; British rapper	37	March 8, 2026	Gambia	Undisclosed
Tommy DeCarlo; Boston	60	March 9, 2026	Charlotte, North Carolina, U.S.	Brain cancer
Phil Campbell; Motörhead, Phil Campbell and the Bastard Sons	64	March 13, 2026	Pontypridd, Wales, U.K.	Complications from surgery
Paul Geremia; American blues musician	81	March 14, 2026	Providence, Rhode Island, United States	Undisclosed
Cinzia Oscar; Italian singer and actress	63	March 15, 2026	Naples, Italy	A long illness
Paki Canzi; I Nuovi Angeli	78	March 15, 2026	Milan, Italy	Undisclosed
Dolores Keane; De Dannan	72	March 16, 2026	Caherlistrane, County Galway, Ireland	Undisclosed
Bettina Köster; German musician	66	March 16, 2026	Capaccio Paestum, Italy	Undisclosed
Wayne Perkins; American guitarist and singer-songwriter	74	March 16, 2026	Argo, Alabama, U.S.	Stroke
Terry Cox; Pentangle	89	March 19, 2026	Mahón, Menorca, Spain	Undisclosed
Louie Louie; Puerto Rican musician and record producer	63	March 20, 2026	Redmond, Oregon, United States	Undisclosed
Daniel Buira; Los Piojos	54	March 21, 2026	Buenos Aires, Argentina	Undisclosed
Steve Houben; Belgian jazz saxophonist and flutist	76	March 21, 2026	Banneux, Belgium	Undisclosed
Ronnie Bowman; Bluegrass guitarist and singer-songwriter	64	March 22, 2026	Nashville, Tennessee, U.S.	Motorcycle accident
Chip Taylor; American singer and songwriter and member of Just Us	86	March 23, 2026	New York, New York, U.S.	Cancer
Gameboy Tetris; 5miinust	40	March 24, 2026	Tallinn, Estonia	Suicide
Dash Crofts; Seals & Crofts	87	March 25, 2026	Austin, Texas, U.S.	Complications from heart surgery
Ahmad Kaabour; Lebanese singer, composer, and actor	70	March 26, 2026	Beirut, Lebanon	A long illness
Ross the Boss; The Dictators, Manowar	72	March 26, 2026	New York, United States	ALS
Jon Dee Graham; The Skunks, True Believers	67	March 27, 2026	Austin, Texas, U.S.	Died after a fall
Doug Irwin; Guitar maker for Jerry Garcia and others	76	March 27, 2026	California, United States	Undisclosed
DJ Dan; American house music DJ	57	March 28, 2026		Heart attack
Matt Krupanski; BoySetsFire	48	March 28, 2026	Danbury, Connecticut, United States	Complications following a car accident
Marinella; Greek singer	87	March 28, 2026	Kifisia, Greece	Undisclosed
David Riondino; Italian singer-songwriter and actor	73	March 29, 2026	Rome, Italy	A serious illness
Greg Elmore; Quicksilver Messenger Service, The Brogues	79	March 29, 2026	Jerome, Idaho, U.S.	Undisclosed
Walt Maddox; The Marcels	88	March 30, 2026	Pittsburgh, Pennsylvania, U.S.	Undisclosed
Christopher North; Ambrosia	75	March 30, 2026	Los Angeles, California, U.S.	Medical complications after being hit by a car
Carl Bonafede; Manager for The Buckinghams, Daughters of Eve	85	March 30, 2026	Chicago, Illinois, U.S.	Complications from pneumonia
Tony Rivers; Harmony Grass	85	March 30, 2026	Selby, England, U.K.	Sepsis
Bill Leader; English record producer and engineer	96	March 31, 2026	U.K.	A short illness
Suki Lahav; E Street Band	74	April 1, 2026	Jerusalem, Israel	Cancer
Bo Lueders; Harm’s Way	39	April 2, 2026	Chicago, Illinois, United States	Suicide
James Gadson; Charles Wright & the Watts 103rd Street Rhythm Band	86	April 2, 2026	Los Angeles, California, United States	Undisclosed
Fred Simon; The Lost Generation, The Chi-Lites	74	April 3, 2026	Illinois, Chicago, United States	Undisclosed
Alvin L Brazilian musician and songwriter	67	April 5, 2026	Rio de Janeiro, Brazil	Heart attack
Donn Landee; Record producer for Van Halen, The Doobie Brothers	79	April 5, 2026	Los Angeles, California, United States	Natural causes
David Wiffen; English-Canadian folk singer-songwriter	84	April 5, 2026	Ottawa, Ontario, Canada	Undisclosed
Albert Mazibuko; Ladysmith Black Mambazo	77	April 5, 2026	Estcourt, KwaZulu-Natal, South Africa	A short illness
Blondy; The Sequence	66	April 6, 2026	Atlanta, Georgia, United States	Undisclosed
Michail Belchev; Bulgarian singer-songwriter and poet	79	April 6, 2026	Sofia, Bulgaria	Undisclosed
Al Gunn; Men Without Hats	65	April 8, 2026	Montreal, Quebec, Canada	Undisclosed
Afrika Bambaataa; American DJ, rapper, and record producer	68	April 9, 2026	Pennsylvania, U.S.	Prostate cancer
Ray Monette; Rare Earth	79	April 9, 2026	Farmington, Michigan, U.S.	Undisclosed
Rudy Graf; Warlock	61	April 10, 2026		Undisclosed
Harry Kim; The Phenix Horns, Phil Collins Band	74	April 10, 2026	Simi Valley, California, U.S.	Cancer
Mike Westbrook; English jazz pianist and composer	90	April 11, 2026	Exeter, England, U.K.	Undisclosed
Asha Bhosle; Indian playback singer	92	April 12, 2026	Mumbai, Maharashtra, India	Multiple organ failure
Patrick Campbell-Lyons; Nirvana (1960s band not 1990s band)	82	April 13, 2026	Athens, Greece	Undisclosed
Moya Brennan; Clannad	73	April 13, 2026	Gweedore, Donegal, Ireland	Pulmonary fibrosis
Donald K. Tarlton; Canadian record producer and promoter	82	April 13, 2026	Montreal, Quebec, Canada	Undisclosed
Felipe Staiti; Enanitos Verdes	64	April 13, 2026	Mendoza, Argentina	Complications from a bacterial infection
Taylor Kirk; Timber Timbre	44	April 14, 2026	Orono, Ontario, Canada	Undisclosed
Miru Shinoda yahyel	33–34	April 14, 2026		Undisclosed illness
Lucha Moreno; Mexican singer and actress	86	April 15, 2026	Mexico City, Mexico	Natural causes
Don Schlitz; American songwriter	73	April 16, 2026	Nashville, Tennessee, U.S.	A sudden illness
Ernie Smith; Jamaican reggae singer	80	April 16, 2026	Miami, Florida, U.S.	Undisclosed
Shiran Kaïdine; Year of No Light, Monarch	44	April 17, 2026		Cancer
Dave Mason; Traffic, Fleetwood Mac	79	April 19, 2026	Gardnerville, Nevada, U.S.	Undisclosed
Alan Osmond; The Osmonds	76	April 20, 2026	Lehi, Utah, U.S.	Multiple sclerosis
Wayne Moss; Area Code 615, Barefoot Jerry	88	April 20, 2026	Nashville, Tennessee, U.S.	Cancer
Werner Hoyer; Scorpions	71	April 21, 2026		Heart Attack
Gregg Foreman; The Delta 72, Cat Power	53	April 21, 2026	Los Angeles, California, U.S.	Undisclosed
Evelyne Lenton; Belle Epoque	80	April 22, 2026	Sacile, Italy	Undisclosed
James Valentine; Jo Jo Zep and the Falcons, Models, Absent Friends	64	April 22, 2026	Sydney, Australia	Assisted suicide
Ruth Slenczynska; American classical pianist	101	April 22, 2026	California, U.S.	Undisclosed
Kim Bowers; Spdfgh	52	April 24, 2026	Brisbane, Australia	Breast cancer
Tony Wilson; Hot Chocolate	89	April 24, 2026	Trinidad, Trinidad and Tobago	Undisclosed
Daniel Huck; French jazz reedist and singer	78	April 25, 2026	Saint-Christol-lès-Alès, France	Undisclosed
Abbe Lane; American singer and actress	93	April 25, 2026	Los Angeles, California, U.S.	Natural causes
Nedra Talley; The Ronettes	80	April 26, 2026	Chesapeake, Virginia, U.S.	Undisclosed
Jerry.K; South Korean rapper	42	April 27, 2026	Seoul, South Korea	Glioblastoma
Beverley Martyn; English folk singer-songwriter	79	April 27, 2026	Brighton, England	Undisclosed
Cleetis Mack; Digital Underground	57	April 28, 2026		Undisclosed
David Allan Coe; American country singer	86	April 29, 2026	Dallas, Texas, U.S.	Undisclosed
Alex Ligertwood; The Senate, Santana, The Jeff Beck Group	79	April 30, 2026	Santa Monica, California, U.S.	Undisclosed
Bobby Murray; American electric blues guitarist, songwriter and record producer	72	April 30, 2026	St. Clairsville, Ohio, U.S.	Complications from pulmonary fibrosis
Georg Wadenius; Blood, Sweat & Tears, Made in Sweden	80	April 30, 2026	Stockholm, Sweden	Undisclosed
Michael Sollis; Australian musician and artistic director	40	May 1, 2026	Canberra, Australia	Bowel cancer
Peter Volkmann; Relax	74	May 1, 2026	Bavaria, Germany	Undisclosed
Jesse Hector; The Gorillas	78	May 6, 2026	London, England, U.K.	Heart attack
Warren Tipton; The Chi-Lites	69	May 9, 2026	Las Vegas, Nevada, U.S.	Undisclosed
Jack Douglas; American record producer	80	May 11, 2026	Paramus, New Jersey, U.S.	Complications from lymphoma
Clarence Carter; American soul singer-songwriter and musician	90	May 13, 2026	Atlanta, Georgia, U.S.	Complications from pneumonia
Claudine Longet; French singer and actress	84	May 14, 2026	Aspen, Colorado, U.S.	Undisclosed
Dennis Locorriere; Dr. Hook	76	May 16, 2026	West Sussex, England, U.K.	Kidney disease
Ryan Porter; American trombonist	46	May 16, 2026	Los Angeles, California, United States	Car crash
Ike Willis; Guitarist for Frank Zappa	70	May 16, 2026	North Las Vegas, Nevada, U.S.	Undisclosed
Totó la Momposina; Colombian singer	85	May 17, 2026	Celaya, Guanajuato, Mexico	Myocardial infarction
Al Hurricane Jr. American singer and songwriter	66	May 19, 2026	Albuquerque, New Mexico	Heart attack
Jimmy Hughes; American rhythm and blues singer	88	May 20, 2026	Leighton, Alabama, U.S.	Undisclosed
Denyse LePage; Lime	75	May 20, 2026	Montreal, Quebec, Canada	Stroke
Rob Base; Rob Base & DJ E-Z Rock	59	May 22, 2026	New York, United States	Cancer
Dick Parry; English saxophonist	83	May 22, 2026	London, England	Undisclosed
Sonny Rollins; American jazz saxophonist	95	May 25, 2026	Woodstock, New York, U.S.	Undisclosed
Doug Shaw; White Magic, Gang Gang Dance	42	May 26, 2026	New York, New York, U.S.	Stroke
Steve Barrow; British reggae producer; co-founder of Blood and Fire	80	May 27, 2026	Weston-super-Mare, Somerset, England, U.K.	Emphysema
Lauren Bennett; G.R.L., Paradiso Girls	36	May 29, 2026	Meopham, England, U.K.	Suicide by hanging
Geoff Keating; The Master Singers	88	May 29, 2026	East Kilbride, Scotland	Undisclosed
Ronald LaPread; Commodores	75	May 30, 2026	Auckland, New Zealand	Undisclosed
Joe Negri; American jazz guitarist	99	May 30, 2026	Scott Township, Pennsylvania, U.S.	Undisclosed
Foster Sylvers; The Sylvers	64	May 30, 2026	Memphis, Tennessee, United States	Prostate cancer
Peabo Bryson; American R&B singer and songwriter	75	June 2, 2026	Marietta, Georgia, U.S.	Stroke
David Wong; Hong Kong-born singer-songwriter	61	June 2, 2026	Honolulu, Hawaii, U.S.	Undisclosed
Ian Hampton; Sparks	79	June 3, 2026	Hereford, England	Undisclosed
James Blood Ulmer; American guitarist and singer	86	June 3, 2026	New York, New York, U.S.	Undisclosed
John B. Williams; American bassist	85	June 4, 2026		Complicatoins from a fall
Talay Riley; British singer-songwriter	35	June 5, 2026	London, England, U.K.	Stabbed to death
Indio Solari; Patricio Rey y sus Redonditos de Ricota	77	June 5, 2026	Ituzaingó, Argentina	Parkinson's disease
Yishai Levi; Israeli Mizrahi singer	63	June 7, 2026	Jerusalem, Israel	COPD
Steff Fontaine; Uriah Heep	70	June 9, 2026		Undisclosed
Philip Adrian Booth; British-Canadian guitarist and keyboardist	66	June 11, 2026	Canada	Undisclosed
Stranger Cole; Jamaican reggae singer	83	June 11, 2026	Kingston, Jamaica	Undisclosed
Görel Johnsen; Manager for ABBA; executive for Polar Music	76	June 13, 2026	Stockholm, Sweden	Undisclosed
Zhang Kepeng; Black Panther	54	June 13, 2026	Beijing, China	Undisclosed
Dee Palmer; Jethro Tull	88	June 13, 2026	Shropshire, England	Undisclosed illness
Lucas Frota; Brazilian musician, DJ, music producer	27	June 14, 2026	Rio de Janeiro, Brazil	2026 Rio de Janeiro mid-air collision
Oliver Tree; American rapper, record producer, filmmaker	32	June 14, 2026	Rio de Janeiro, Brazil	2026 Rio de Janeiro mid-air collision
Ronell Johnson; Preservation Hall Jazz Band	49	June 14, 2026	New Orleans, Louisiana, U.S	Heart attack
Dave Greenslade; Colosseum, If, Greenslade	83	June 14, 2026	Bungay, Suffolk, England	Undisclosed
Abdullah Ibrahim; South African jazz pianist	91	June 15, 2026	Prien am Chiemsee, Germany	A short illness
Teddie Beverley; The Beverley Sisters	99	June 17, 2026	U.K.	Undisclosed
Walter Parazaider; Chicago	81	June 17, 2026	Henderson, Nevada, U.S.	Alzheimer's disease
Justin Cary; Sixpence None the Richer	50	June 18, 2026	Albany, New York, U.S.	Stroke
Tay Keith; American record producer	29	June 18, 2026	Nashville, Tennessee, U.S.	Drug overdose
Kirsti Sparboe; Norwegian singer and actress	79	June 19, 2026	Tromsø, Norway	A short illness
Akihiro Miwa; Japanese actor and singer	91	June 20, 2026	Japan	Undisclosed
Clive Davis; American record executive and producer	94	June 22, 2026	New York, New York, U.S.	Undisclosed
Guesch Patti; French singer	80	June 22, 2026	Paris, France	A long illness
Bruce Tull; Scud Mountain Boys	71	June 22, 2026	Tulsa, Oklahoma, U.S.	A brief illness
Jani Wickholm; Finnish pop and rock singer	48	June 23, 2026	Finland	Undisclosed
David Clayton-Thomas; Blood, Sweat & Tears	84	June 24, 2026	Toronto, Canada	Undisclosed
Manuel van Der Dijs; Van Der Dijs		June 24, 2026	La Guaira, Venezuela	2026 Venezuela earthquakes
Gabriel Gómez; Van Der Dijs		June 24, 2026	La Guaira, Venezuela	2026 Venezuela earthquakes
Xander Hernández; Van Der Dijs		June 24, 2026	La Guaira, Venezuela	2026 Venezuela earthquakes
Abraham Foucault; Van Der Dijs		June 24, 2026	La Guaira, Venezuela	2026 Venezuela earthquakes
January Ordu; DJ Company	55	June 26, 2026		Undisclosed
Joe Murphy; Koopa	46	June 27, 2026		Undisclosed
Teruki Gotō; Japanese musician and political activist	43	June 28, 2026	Japan	Undisclosed
Vlado Janevski; Macedonian singer	65	June 28, 2026	Skopje, North Macedonia	A short illness
Daniel Melingo; Los Abuelos de la Nada, Los Twist	68	June 30, 2026	Buenos Aires, Argentina	A respiratory illness
Victor Willis; Village People	74	June 30, 2026		Liver cancer
Shaun Glass; Broken Hope, Soil, Dirge Within	57	July 1, 2026	Chicago, Illinois, U.S.	Stroke
Joe Melson; American singer-songwriter	91	July 1, 2026	Nashville, Tennessee, U.S.	Undisclosed
Sparky D American hip-hop musician and rapper	61	July 4, 2026		Undisclosed
Beaky (John Dymond); Dave Dee, Dozy, Beaky, Mick & Tich	81	July 5, 2026	Salisbury, Wiltshire, England, U.K.	Undisclosed
Kevin Chown; Chad Smith's Bombastic Meatbats, Artension	56	July 6, 2026	Escanaba, Michigan, U.S.	Cancer
Megas; Icelandic singer-songwriter	81	July 6, 2026	Reykjavik, Iceland	Undisclosed
Paul Wheatbread; Gary Puckett & The Union Gap	80	July 6, 2026	San Diego, California, U.S.	Complications from kidney failure and Alzheimer's disease
Rodney Franklin; American jazz pianist	67	July 8, 2026	Berkeley, California, United States	Undisclosed
Bonnie Tyler; Welsh singer-songwriter	75	July 8, 2026	Faro, Portugal	Complications following intestinal surgery
Calvin Hayes; Johnny Hates Jazz	63	July 9, 2026	Spokane, Washington, U.S.	Undisclosed
Lenzman; Dutch drum and bass DJ and producer	47	July 11, 2026	Amsterdam, Netherlands	Kidney cancer
Peppino Di Capri; Italian singer, songwriter, and pianist	86	July 11, 2026	Capri, Italy	A long illness
Mary Morello; Founder of Parents for Rock and Rap	102	July 12, 2026	Los Angeles, California, U.S.	Undisclosed
Vernon Taylor; Rockabilly musician	88	July 12, 2026	Hagerstown, Maryland, United States	Undisclosed
Mike Browning; Morbid Angel, Nocturnus	62	July 13, 2026	Tampa, Florida, United States	Undisclosed
Little Gerhard; Swedish singer and rock musician	92	July 14, 2026	Stockholm, Sweden	Undisclosed
Fantan Mojah; Jamaican reggae singer	49	July 14, 2026	Kingston, Jamaica	Heart complications
Plas Johnson; American jazz saxophonist	94	July 15, 2026	Los Angeles, California, U.S.	Undisclosed
Alan Walden; American manager and promoter	83	July 16, 2026	Macon, Georgia, U.S.	Undisclosed
Freddy Cannon; American rock and roll singer	89	July 17, 2026	Oxnard, California, U.S.	Cancer
Raja Azreen; Malaysian rock drummer for the band Meditasi	56	July 18, 2026	Kuantan, Malaysia	After collapsing onstage during a performance
Gianni Cazzola; Italian jazz drummer	88	July 18, 2026	Busto Arsizio, Italy	After collapsing onstage during a performance
Jennifer Finch; L7	59	July 18, 2026	Culver City, California, U.S.	Brain cancer
Jim Gilstrap; American singer	79	July 18, 2026	Los Angeles, California, United States	Undisclosed
Tony Thorpe; The Rubettes	80	July 18, 2026	Fleetwood, Lanchasire, England, U.K.	Undisclosed
Oliver Jones; Canadian jazz pianist	91	July 22, 2026	Montreal, Quebec, Canada	Undisclosed
William Orbit; Bassomatic, Torch Song	69	July 23, 2026	London, England	Undisclosed
Lou Koller; Sick of It All, Blood from the Soul	61	July 24, 2026	Matawan, New Jersey, U.S	Esophageal cancer
Geraldine Bey (Geraldine de Haas); American jazz singer	91	July 28, 2026	Englewood, New Jersey, U.S.	Natural causes
Kavinsky; French DJ and producer	50	July 28, 2026	Paris, France	Undisclosed
Glen Hansard; The Frames, The Swell Season	56	July 29, 2026	Strawberry Beds, Ireland	Motorcycle accident
Arlene Smith; The Chantels	84	July 29, 2026	New York, New York, U.S.	Natural causes
Gunnar Þórðarson; Icelandic musician and composer	81	July 30, 2026	Reykjavík, Iceland	Undisclosed
Glenn A. Baker; Australian rock music journalist	74	July 31, 2026	Sydney, Australia	Complications from a stroke
Jeff Conolly; Lyres, DMZ	69	July 31, 2026	Massachusetts, U.S.	Bladder cancer
Jerney Kaagman; Earth and Fire	79	July 31, 2026	Blaricum, Netherlands	Parkinson's disease
David Z Lipps Inc.	78	August 2, 2026	Burbank, California, U.S.	Complications of an infection
John Douglas; Trashcan Sinatras	63	August 3, 2026	Irvine, North Ayrshire, Scotland, U.K.	Undisclosed
Grace Chang; Chinese actress and singer	93	August 3, 2026	Hong Kong, China	A short illness
Pepe Habichuela; Spanish guitarist	81	August 4, 2026	Madrid, Spain	Undisclosed illness
Terry Buffalo Ware; American country rock guitarist	76	August 5, 2026	Norman, Oklahoma, U.S.	Lung cancer
Peter Katsis; Manager for Backstreet Boys, Korn, Jane's Addiction	69	August 6, 2026	Los Angeles, California, U.S.	Congestive heart failure
Tony Scott; Surinamese Dutch rapper and musician	54	August 6, 2026	Weesp, Netherlands	Multiple sclerosis
Francesco Guccini; Italian singer-songwriter	86	August 6, 2026	Sambuca Pistoiese, Italy	Undisclosed
Cat Dowling; Alphastates	54	August 7, 2026	Blanchardstown, Dublin, Ireland	Breast cancer
Violet Hensley; American luthier and fiddler	109	August 7, 2026	Yellville, Arkansas, U.S.	Undisclosed
Randy Burns; American singer-songwriter and guitarist	78	August 8, 2026	Melbourne, Florida, U.S.	Undisclosed
Mike Milford; Scars of Tomorrow	46	August 8, 2026	Orange County, California, U.S.	Cancer
Gary Dwyer; The Teardrop Explodes	66	August 9, 2026	Liverpool, England, United Kingdom	Leukemia
Sensational; Guyanese-American rapper	51	August 11, 2026	Brooklyn, New York, United States	Undisclosed
Gary Johnson; China Crisis	61	August 12, 2026	Liverpool, England	Undisclosed
Ruby Andrews; American soul singer	79	August 13, 2026	Chicago, Illinois, U.S.	Undisclosed
Derry Brownson; EMF	55	August 13, 2026	Cinderford, England, U.K.	Brain tumour
Johnny Young; Australian singer-songwriter	79	August 13, 2026	Perth, Australia	Pancreatic cancer
Dave Marsh; American music critic and author	76	August 14, 2026	Norwalk, Connecticut, U.S.	Undisclosed
Hayden Panettiere; American actress and singer	36	August 16, 2026	Greenville, South Carolina, U.S.	Drug overdose
Frank Beard; ZZ Top	77	August 17, 2026	Richmond, Texas, U.S.	Undisclosed
Barry Mitchell; Queen	76	August 17, 2026	U.K.	Undisclosed
Vanessa Rangadhol; Sugarpop	30	August 19, 2026	Manila, Philippines	Accidental fall
Janie Bradford; American songwriter	87	August 21, 2026	Los Angeles, California, U.S.	An extended illness
Keith Keith; Funky 4 + 1	64	August 21, 2026	Morris Heights, the Bronx, New York, United States	Undisclosed
Shelley Fabares; American actress and singer	82	August 22, 2026	Los Angeles, California, U.S.	Pneumonia
Latimore; American blues and R&B singer	86	August 22, 2026	Tampa, Florida, U.S.	Undisclosed
Jaye P. Morgan; American actress and singer	94	August 24, 2026	Longview, Washington, U.S.	Undisclosed
Tim Curry; English actor and singer; starred in The Rocky Horror Picture Show	80	August 25, 2026	Los Angeles, California, U.S.	Multiple health issues following a stroke
Dimitris Kokotas; Greek singer and composer	57	August 25, 2026	Athens, Greece	Cardiac arrest
Dolly Parton; American country singer	80	August 25, 2026	Nashville, Tennessee, U.S.	Cancer
Jack Grassel; American jazz guitarist	77	August 26, 2026	Caledonia, Wisconsin, U.S.	Car crash caused by a medical episode
Rubén Rada; Uruguayan musician	83	August 26, 2026	Montevideo, Uruguay	Pneumonia
Granville Straker; Vincentian-American record label owner and record producer	86	August 27, 2026	Brooklyn, New York, United States	Undisclosed
Gene Bertoncini; American jazz guitarist	89	August 29, 2026	New York, New York, U.S.	Undisclosed
David Fair; Half Japanese	74	August 29, 2026		Cancer
Antonino Fogliani; Italian conductor	50	August 29, 2026	Zurich, Switzerland	A long illness
Joey BPR; Malaysian singer-songwriter	63	August 29, 2026	Kuala Lumpur, Malaysia	Intracranial hemorrhage and cardiac complications
Frankie Miller; American country musician	95	August 29, 2026	Arlington, Texas, U.S.	Natural causes
Wacko; UTP	52	August 29, 2026		Undisclosed
Jonathan Meléndez; Camilo Séptimo	38	September 1, 2026	Atizapán de Zaragoza, Mexico	Murder
Cassandra Wilson; American jazz singer	70	September 2, 2026	Jackson, Mississippi, U.S.	Undisclosed
Craig Douglas; English pop singer	85	September 4, 2026	Isle of Wight, England, U.K.	A short illness
Jon Small; The Hassles, Attila	78	September 4, 2026	West Palm Beach, Florida, U.S.	Cancer
Andy Williams; Every Time I Die	48	September 5, 2026	Pittsburgh, Pennsylvania, U.S.	Undisclosed
Pat Senatore; American jazz bassist	91	September 8, 2026	Studio City, California, United States	Undisclosed
Tone Capone; American hip-hop producer	59	September 12, 2026	Las Vegas, Nevada, U.S.	Undisclosed
Cheetah Chrome; Dead Boys, Rocket from the Tombs	71	September 13, 2026	Nashville, Tennessee, U.S.	Undisclosed
BloodHound Q50; American rapper	22	September 13, 2026	Chicago, Illinois, U.S.	Murder
Pete Byrne; Naked Eyes	74	September 14, 2026	Los Angeles, California, U.S.	A brief illness
Catherine Ringer; Les Rita Mitsouko	68	September 14, 2026	Paris, France	Cancer
Rosalind Ashford; Martha and the Vandellas	83	September 15, 2026	Detroit, Michigan, U.S.	Undisclosed
Pye Dubois; Lyricist for Max Webster and Rush	77	September 15, 2026	London, Ontario, Canada	Undisclosed
Ronnie Dove; American pop and country singer	91	September 15, 2026	Pasadena, Maryland, U.S.	Undisclosed
Gerrit Graham; American actor, screenwriter, and songwriter	76	September 15, 2026	Rhinebeck, New York, U.S.	Complications from lung disease
Ben Saunders; Dutch pop singer	43	September 15, 2026	Overbetuwe, Netherlands	Drowning
Duncan Sheik; American singer-songwriter	56	September 17, 2026	New York, New York, U.S.	Cardiac arrest
Sway; British-Ghanaian rapper	44	September 17, 2026	Accra, Ghana	Undisclosed
Gary McCracken; Max Webster	75	September 17, 2026	Sarnia, Ontario, Canada	Cancer
Chad Gilbert; New Found Glory	45	September 20, 2026	Nashville, Tennessee, U.S.	Adrenal cancer
Neil Henderson; Bay City Rollers, Middle of the Road	73	September 20, 2026	Scotland	Undisclosed
Angry Anderson; Rose Tattoo	79	September 21, 2026	Sydney, New South Wales, Australia	Cardiac arrest
Jorge Palma; Portuguese singer and songwriter	76	September 21, 2026	Lisbon, Portugal	Cardiac arrest
Rick Sollo; Rick & Renner	59	September 21, 2026	Urubici, Santa Catarina, Brazil	Helicopter crash
Jackie Jackson; Toots and the Maytals	79	September 23, 2026	Montego Bay, Jamaica	After a long illness
Moses Matovu; Afrigo Band	77	September 24, 2026	Kampala, Uganda	Fell while being attacked by assailants
Bruno Kramm; Das Ich	58	September 25, 2026	Granada, Spain	Collapsed backstage after a performance
Chuck Varga; Gwar	68	September 25, 2026	Brooklyn, New York, United States	Cancer
Liu Huan; Chinese singer-songwriter	63	September 25, 2026	Shanghai, China	Undisclosed
Guruh Sukarnoputra; Indonesian politician, artist, and musician	73	September 26, 2026	Jakarta, Indonesia	Undisclosed
Mighty Sparrow; Trinidadian calypso musician	91	September 27, 2026	New York, New York, U.S.	Undisclosed
Manuel Seal; American record producer and songwriter	66	September 27, 2026	Atlanta, Georgia, U.S.	Undisclosed
Nicole Taylor; Taylor Red	35	September 28, 2026	Nashville, Tennessee, U.S.	Breast cancer
Del Casher; American guitarist and inventor	88	October 1, 2026		Cancer
Conrad Lant; Venom, Cronos	63	October 1, 2026		Undisclosed
Sass Jordan; Canadian rock singer	65	October 2, 2026	Montreal, Quebec, Canada	Undisclosed
Freddie Jackson; American R&B singer and songwriter	70	October 5, 2026	New York, New York, U.S.	Undisclosed
Lena Martell; Scottish singer	86	October 5, 2026		Undisclosed
Verne Allison; The Dells	90	October 7, 2026	Chicago, Illinois, U.S.	Undisclosed
Chris Welsh; Died Pretty, The Screaming Tribesmen	71	October 8, 2026	Melbourne, Australia	Cancer
Friedrick van Stegeren; Dutch-born Italian radio host and record producer	76	October 9, 2026	Monopoli, Italy	A sudden illness
Goran Bare; Majke	61	October 9, 2026	Zagreb, Croatia	Undisclosed
Rory Bourke; American country songwriter	84	October 10, 2026	Nashville, Tennessee, U.S.	Undisclosed
Wilma De Angelis; Italian singer and television presenter	96	October 11, 2026	Milan, Italy	Undisclosed
Lucian Piane; American composer and record producer	46	October 12, 2026	Glendale, California, U.S.	Hit by a car
Giorgio Bracardi; Italian actor, comedian, and musician	93	October 12, 2026	Rome, Italy	Complications following a femoral fracture
David Surkamp; Pavlov's Dog	73	October 13, 2026		Undisclosed
Eddie Friel; Irish singer-songwriter, represented Ireland in the 1995 Eurovision Song Contest	64	October 14, 2026	Innsbruck, Austria	Undisclosed health issues
Sam Noto; American jazz trumpeter	96	October 16, 2026	Buffalo, New York, U.S.	Undisclosed
Lua Blanco; Rebeldes	39	October 18, 2026	Rio de Janeiro, Brazil	Intestinal cancer
Benito di Paula; Brazilian singer-songwriter, composer, pianist	84	October 18, 2026	São Paulo, Brazil	Prostate cancer
Gary Heffern; The Penetrators	72	October 18, 2026	Rovaniemi, Finland	Undisclosed
Mr. Whitekeys; American musician and recording artist	79	October 19, 2026		Undisclosed
Saúl Blanch; Rata Blanca	75	October 20, 2026	Argentina	Undisclosed
Anita Louis; The Soul Children	76	October 20, 2026	Memphis, Tennessee, U.S.	Undisclosed
John Anderson; American country singer	71	October 21, 2026	Smithville, Tennessee, U.S.	Undisclosed
Judith Blegen; American soprano	85	October 23, 2026		Undisclosed
Dónal Lunny; Planxty, The Bothy Band, Moving Hearts, Emmet Spiceland, Andy Irvine & Dónal Lunny's Mozaik, Usher's Island	79	October 23, 2026	Dublin, Ireland	Cancer
Nigel Durham; Saxon	61	October 24, 2026		Undisclosed
Derrick Harriott; Jamaican singer and record producer	87	October 24, 2026		Undisclosed
Roxana Amed; Argentine jazz singer	63	October 25, 2026	Miami, Florida, U.S.	Undisclosed
Peggy King; American jazz singer and actress	96	October 25, 2026	Wynnewood, Pennsylvania, U.S.	Complications of Alzheimer's disease
Misha Mavashi; Russian rapper and activist	41	October 25, 2026	Voronezh, Russia	Undisclosed
Guyton Sanders; Vandoliers	54	October 25, 2026	Dallas, Texas, U.S.	Cancer
Donnie Iris; The Jaggerz, Wild Cherry	83	October 26, 2026	Pittsburgh, Pennsylvania, U.S.	Bladder cancer
Mark McGuinn; American country musician	58	October 26, 2026		Undisclosed
Eddie Gray; Tommy James and the Shondells	78	October 27, 2026		Undisclosed
Stephen Kovacevich; American classical pianist and conductor	86	October 27, 2026	London, England, U.K.	Undisclosed
Valery Lysenko; Mister Twister	65	October 27, 2026		Undisclosed
Bobby Wright; American country singer and actor	84	October 27, 2026	Madison, Tennessee, U.S.	Undisclosed
Gullan Bornemark; Swedish musician, lyricist, and composer	98	October 28, 2026	Malmö, Sweden	Undisclosed
Marisa Manchado; Spanish classical pianist, composer, and academic	70	October 28, 2026	Los Yébenes, Spain	2026 Toledo train collision
Cevin Fisher; American house music DJ and record producer	63	October 29, 2026	Prévessin-Moëns, France	Cancer
Sandra Kerr; English folk singer	84	October 29, 2026		Leukemia
Melvin Sephus; The Rude Boys		c. October 29, 2026		Undisclosed
Bill Clifton; Bluegrass musician	95	October 30, 2026	Mendota, Virginia, U.S.	Undisclosed
Steve Ellis; Love Affair	76	October 30, 2026		Complications from a chronic illness
Juan Atkins; The Belleville Three, Cybotron	64	October 31, 2026	Mexico City, Mexico	Undisclosed
Jacques Bolognesi; Orchestre National de Jazz	79	November 1, 2026		Undisclosed
Tony Butala; The Lettermen	87	November 1, 2026	Manitowoc, Wisconsin, U.S.	Undisclosed
Clem Cattini; Johnny Kidd & the Pirates, The Tornados, Apollo 100	89	November 2, 2026	London, England, U.K.	Injuries from a fall
Rochelle Fleming; First Choice	72	November 5, 2026		Undisclosed
Richard Lloyd; Television, Rocket from the Tombs	75	November 7, 2026	Chattanooga, Tennessee, U.S.	Cholangiocarcinoma
Bar Belfer; Israeli actress and musician	37	November 8, 2026		Epileptic seizure
Johnny McEvoy; Irish folk singer	81	November 8, 2026	Greystones, Ireland	Undisclosed
Brian Ahern; Canadian record producer and guitarist	81	November 9, 2026	Minnesota, U.S.	Undisclosed
Antonello Palombi; Italian opera singer	58	November 9, 2026	Mainz, Germany	Undisclosed
Marcos Camino; Los Palmeras	76	November 10, 2026	Santa Fe, Argentina	Suicide by hanging
Steve Camp; American contemporary Christian singer and pastor	71	November 11, 2026	Fort Pierce, Florida, U.S	Heart failure
Tony Richards; W.A.S.P.	69	November 11, 2026		Undisclosed
Young L The Pack	39	c. November 12, 2026	Tampa, Florida, U.S.	Undisclosed
Jan Pijnenburg; Doe Maar	70	November 12, 2026	Spain	Undisclosed
Dan Hall; Taxiride	48	November 13, 2026	Melbourne, Victoria, Australia	Undisclosed
Richard Sterban; The Oak Ridge Boys	83	November 14, 2026	Hendersonville, Tennessee, U.S.	Complications of bronchitis and pneumonia
John Christ; Danzig, Samhain	61	November 15, 2026		Undisclosed
Vinny Chase; American rapper	40	November 16, 2026		Car accident
Peet Peera (Phira Thetwisan); Peacemaker	47	November 17, 2026	Pak Kret, Thailand	Undisclosed
Jordan Brunoli; Bugs	31	November 18, 2026		Colorectal cancer
Tommy Mars; Frank Zappa's band	75	November 19, 2026		Undisclosed
Geoff Whitehorn; If, Crawler, Procol Harum	75	November 19, 2026	Dartford, England	Complications arising from cancer treatment

== See also ==
- List of deaths in popular music
- List of murdered hip hop musicians
- 27 Club
