= Gin (album) =

Studio album by Cobalt
- Released: March 17th, 2009
- Genres: Black metal, Folk metal, Americana
- Length: 57:46
- Label: Profound Lore Records

Cobalt chronology
Eater of Birds (2007)	Gin (2009)	Slow Forever (2016)

Gin is the third album by the black metal band Cobalt. It was released by Profound Lore in 2009. The album is dedicated to Ernest Hemingway (pictured in uniform on the cover), and Hunter S. Thompson. It was voted the second best album of 2009 by Terrorizer. The album was recorded at Flatline Audio, in Denver, Colorado.

In 2013, Decibel ranked Gin at number 82 on its list of the Top 100 Black Metal Albums of All Time.

== Track listing ==
No.	Title	Length
1.	"Gin"	7:24
2.	"Dry Body"	8:54
3.	"Arsonry"	5:48
4.	"Throat"	1:58
5.	"Stomach"	6:44
6.	"A Clean, Well-Lighted Place"	3:40
7.	"Pregnant Insect"	6:02
8.	"Two-Thumbed Fist"	9:57
9.	"The Old Man Who Lied for His Entire Life"	2:07
10.	"A Starved Horror"	5:12

== Credits ==
- Erik Wunder - Vocals, Guitar, Bass, Drums
- Phil McSorley - Vocals
