= Slow Forever =

Studio album by Cobalt
- Released: March 25, 2016
- Genre: Sludge metal
- Length: 83:53
- Label: Profound Lore

Cobalt chronology
Gin (2009)	Slow Forever (2016)

Slow Forever is the fourth studio album by American black metal duo Cobalt, released by Profound Lore Records in 2016. It is a double album and the band's first with vocalist Charlie Fell, who replaced founding member Phil McSorley. The album leans more heavily into blackened sludge metal, similar to acts like Anciients and Tombs.

== Composition ==
Critics categorized Slow Forever under a variety of genres, including black metal, post-hardcore, post-grunge, progressive rock, crust punk, sludge metal, American folk, hardcore rock, thrash metal, and hardcore punk.

== Reception ==
Professional ratings
Aggregate scores
Source	Rating
Metacritic	88/100
Review scores
Source	Rating
About.com	4/5 stars
AllMusic	4.5/5 stars
Metal Hammer	4.5/5 stars
Pitchfork	8.4/10
Revolver	4/5
Spin	8/10
Sputnikmusic	4/5

Slow Forever was critically acclaimed upon release, garnering an aggregate 88/100, based on five reviews, from Metacritic. In addition to being ranked the 25th best album of 2016 by Stereogum, it landed in the top-ten of year-end lists from BrooklynVegan, Decibel, and Sputnikmusic. Pitchfork's Grayson Currin also named it the duo's best album yet.

A frequently-highlighted aspect was the songcraft. Currin praised it as "accessible as it is aggressive, with magnetic hooks, shout-along mantras, and sparkling riffs". Dean Brown of Metal Hammer argued that the track-list worked together "as one singular totem" while the songs were "individualistic and animalistic" on their own. Also noted by Brown and AllMusic's James Christopher Monger was the development of the group's musicianship and Wunder and Fell's chemistry. Brown wrote, "Fell's toxic self-hatred and disgust for humanity further intensifies Wunder's inventive, impactful instrumentals, which have developed significantly since Gin." Monger called Fell "a far more dynamic screamer than McSorley, and his feral and elastic wail suits Wunder's newly expansive composition style."

== Track listing ==
Disc 1
No.	Title	Length
1.	"Hunt the Buffalo"	8:48
2.	"Animal Law"	2:47
3.	"Ruiner"	6:32
4.	"Beast Whip"	9:13
5.	"King Rust"	11:14
6.	"Breath"	2:25
7.	"Cold Breaker"	6:44

Disc 2
No.	Title	Length
8.	"Elephant Graveyard"	7:51
9.	"Final Will"	11:16
10.	"Iconoclast"	2:30
11.	"Slow Forever"	9:35
12.	"Siege" (hidden track)	5:38

== Credits ==
- Erik Wunder – all instruments
- Charlie Fell – vocals

== Charts ==
Weekly chart performance for Slow Forever
Chart (2016)	Peak position
US Heatseekers Albums (Billboard)	17
US Top Hard Rock Albums (Billboard)	25
