= Man's Gin =

American band

Man's Gin is a dark folk rock band, formerly led by multi-instrumentalist Erik Wunder of the black metal band Cobalt. Wunder was the vocalist, lyricist, guitarist, drummer, and composer of the band. Man’s Gin began in 2005 as a two-man project in Fort Collins, Colorado, consisting of Erik Wunder and guitarist friend Clint Kamerzell. The two focused on the interaction of voice and guitars and building expansive epic songs on simplistic platforms. ‘The Rum Demos’ (never widely released) was recorded in the winter months of 2006, receiving praise and recognition in many circles of the local Colorado underground scene.

Original member Clint Kamerzell left Colorado in early 2009, and Erik Wunder saw the release of Cobalt’s Gin. Wunder then toured Europe as drummer for Atlanta-based avant-garde musician Jarboe (formerly of Swans) and relocated himself to Brooklyn, New York, where he spent the next five years. Wunder’s New York band consisted of musicians Joshua Lozano (of Inswarm and Jarboe) on upright bass and Scott Edward on lead guitar and piano. This incarnation of Man’s Gin had a rotating roster of drummers and additional live/studio musicians, however the core of the band remained Wunder, Lozano, and Edward.

Man’s Gin became widely known in New York during this time for to its live shows, gaining a dedicated fan following. Music critics at the time often described Man's Gin as 'cocktail grunge'. The band has played shows with such artists as Scott Kelly (Neurosis), Scott "Wino" Weinrich (Saint Vitus and The Obsessed), Jarboe, Dax Riggs, Bruce Lamont (Yakuza/Corrections House), Eugene Robinson (Oxbow) and Kirk Lloyd Fisher (Buzzoven).

Man’s Gin has released two albums on Profound Lore Records. Their debut album, Smiling Dogs, was released in 2010, followed by Rebellion Hymns in 2013. Smiling Dogs was recorded with Colin Marston (Krallice/Gorguts/Dysrythmia) at Menegroth: The Thousand Caves studio in Queens, New York. Rebellion Hymns was recorded with Andrew Schneider (Pigs/Unsane/Keelhaul/Julie Christmas/Converge) at Translator Audio in Brooklyn, shortly before Hurricane Sandy demolished the entire studio building in the fall of 2012.

Wunder left New York in early 2014 and was working on a follow-up to Rebellion Hymns in Colorado until his death in 2025.

Erik Wunder died on July 31, 2025, at the age of 42.
