= Van Der Dijs =

Venezuelan rock band

- Also known as: VDD
- Origin: Caracas, Venezuela
- Genres: Nu metal; rap rock; alternative rock
- Years active: 2024–2026
- Past members: Manuel van Der Dijs; Gabriel Gómez; Xander Hernández; Abraham Foucault

Van Der Dijs (also known as VDD) was a Venezuelan nu metal, rap rock, and alternative rock band formed in Caracas in 2024. The group gained notoriety in the Venezuelan music scene after participating in the Nuevas Bandas Festival and releasing the singles "15 Minutos", "VENPAKA", and "¿DÓNDE ESTÁN?". In June 2026, the band received international attention after all of its members were killed in the 2026 Venezuela earthquakes.

== History ==
Van Der Dijs was formed in Caracas in 2024. Their genre mixed elements of nu metal, rap rock, and alternative rock. In 2025, the group participated in the Festival Nuevas Bandas, one of the main events for discovering new artists in Venezuela.

The band released several singles, including "15 Minutos", "VENPAKA", and "¿DÓNDE ESTÁN?", in addition to performing in different cities across the country. The group also had shows scheduled for Punto Fijo and Valencia.

On 24 June 2026, all four members of the band were killed when a doublet earthquake collapsed the Costamar II building, located in Tanaguarena, in the state of La Guaira, where they were rehearsing. Bassist Xander Hernández was reported to have initially survived, but later died from his injuries while receiving medical attention. The musicians' deaths were confirmed by the Center for Modern Art and Culture (CCAM), where the band had performed a few days earlier.

== Members ==
- Manuel van Der Dijs – vocals
- Gabriel Gómez – guitar
- Xander Hernández – bass, backing vocals
- Abraham Foucault – drums

== Discography ==
=== Singles ===
Title	Year	Album
"Nemesis"	2024	Non-album singles
"Wakanda"	2024	Non-album singles
"¿Dónde Están?"	2025	Non-album singles
"Venpaka"	2025	Non-album singles
"Vendetta"	2025	Non-album singles
"Doble Cara"	2026	Non-album singles
"15 Minutos"	2026	Non-album singles
"7,5"	2026	Non-album singles
