= Mango (group) =

Lithuanian girl trio

MAN-GO (Mango)
- Origin: Lithuania, Klaipėda
- Genres: Pop Europop
- Years active: 1998–2008, 2014–Present
- Labels: Pozitiva; Melodija; Koja
- Members: Rima Petrauskytė; Viktorija Perminaitė (1998-2008, 2018-Present); Gabija Sruogiūtė (since 2014); Justina Dovydenė (since 2016)
- Past members: Asta Bridikytė (1998–2004); Lina Kaklytė-Šerpytė (2004–2008); Justina Jančiauskaitė (2014-2016)
- Website: http://man-go.lt

Mango is a popular Lithuanian girl trio. Created in 1998, it immediately had hits with the covers Pavasariniai žiedai (Spring Blossoms) and Svetimi (Strangers). During its ten-year career Mango released 12 albums that collectively sold some 310,000 copies. It was recognized as the Band of the Year by Radiocentras Awards (2000 and 2001) and by Bravo Awards (2000).

The group was created and produced by brothers Mindaugas and Gintaras Bendžius. Members of the group Rima Petrauskytė, Viktorija (Vika) Perminaitė and Asta Bridikytė were selected after a special competition, organised by Bendžius brothers and composer Žilvinas Liulys. In 2004, Bridikytė left the group and was replaced by Lina Kaklytė. The band announced its retirement in 2007 with a release of the third compilation of its best songs and a good-bye tour across Lithuania, including special appearances for Lithuanian communities in England, Ireland, and United States, with the final concert on March 31, 2008 in Šiauliai Arena. They came back from retirement in 2014 with two new group members. In 2016, Justina Jančiauskaitė left the group and was replaced by Justina Dovydenė

== Discography ==
The group released the following albums:

- Pavasariniai žiedai (1998, single)
- Balsas (1998, certified gold)
- Metų laikai (1999, certified gold and platinum)
- Amžinai tavo (2000, certified gold and double platinum)
- Reikalingi žodžiai (2001, certified gold and double platinum)
- Meilės liepsna (2002, certified gold and platinum)
- 100 dienų (2003, certified gold and platinum)
- Raskila (2004, certified gold and platinum)
- Geriausios dainos / Pirma dalis (2005, certified gold)
- Šilta akimirka (2005, certified gold)
- Geriausios dainos / Antra dalis (2006)
- Pažadėta meilė (2007, certified gold)
- Geriausios dainos / Trečia dalis (2007)
- Aš Taip Norėčiau (2015, certified unknown)
- Tyzeris (2015, single)
- Paviršius širdies (2016, single)
- Nesigailėjau (2016, single)
- Suskaičiuok (2016, single)
- Gali nebegrįžti (2017, single)
- Sustabdykim laiką (2017, single)
- Nidai 2017 (2017, single)
- Vėl kartu (2018, single)
- Nusinešk mane FT. Pikaso (2018, single)
- 2020 (March 3rd, 2020. Album)
