= Güllü (singer) =

Turkish singer (1973–2025)

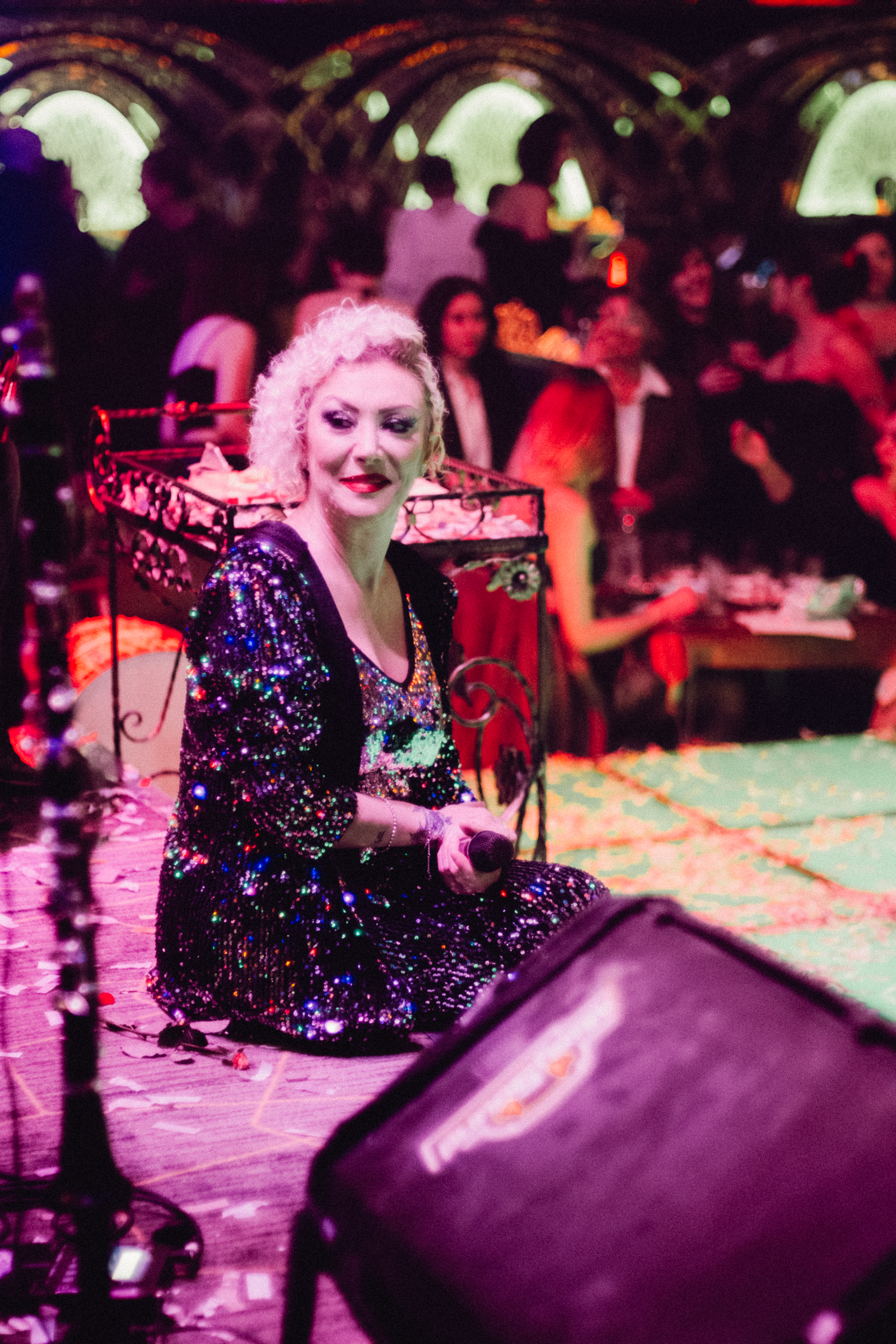
- Güllü in 2024
- Born: Gül Tut; 15 October 1973; Hamburg, West Germany
- Died: 26 September 2025 (aged 51); Çınarcık, Yalova, Turkey
- Resting place: Tuzla Cemetery, Tuzla, Istanbul
- Other name: Kasımpaşalı Güllü
- Occupation: Singer
- Years active: 1988–2025
- Spouse: Gürol Gülter (m. 1996; div. 2002)
- Children: 2

Gül Tut (15 October 1973 – 26 September 2025), better known by her stage name Güllü, was a Romani-origin Turkish singer of fantezi and arabesque music.

== Life and career ==
Güllü was born on 15 October 1973 in Hamburg, Germany. She was of Romani origin. She had an older sister named Kader and a younger brother named Raşit. She completed her primary, secondary, and high school education in Germany. She began her musical career at a young age by singing in nightclubs. In 1988, at the age of 15, she began performing at wedding halls. As she was too young to work in gazinos, she continued her education for a period. However, due to her family's financial difficulties, she dropped out of school and continued her career as a singer.

During the 1990s, she became known as "Kasımpaşalı Güllü". She gained recognition through her Romani-style songs and the albums she released. In 1996, she married music producer Gürol Gülter. She took a break from performing after her marriage. The couple had two children, Tuğyan Ülkem and Tuğberk Yağız Hamza. Following her divorce in 2002, she returned to her music career.

In 2008, she suffered alcohol poisoning in Kartal Yakacık, was hospitalized, and was discharged after receiving treatment. In 2016, she spent six days in prison over an unpaid debt.

== Death ==
Güllü died on 26 September 2025 after falling from a window on the terrace of her home in the Çınarcık district of Yalova. Security camera footage from the house reportedly showed that after leaving the bathroom, she walked toward the terrace, and the sound of a fall was heard shortly afterward. When emergency medical teams arrived at the scene, she was pronounced dead, and her body was taken to the morgue of Yalova Training and Research Hospital. Following an autopsy in Yalova, her funeral prayer was held at Sultan Birinci Ahmed Mosque in Tuzla on 27 September 2025, after which she was buried in Tuzla Cemetery.

=== Judicial investigation ===
The Yalova Governorate announced that an investigation into the death had been launched. On 29 September 2025, Güllü's manager Ferdi Aydın stated during a live broadcast that he believed Güllü had been murdered. On 2 October, Güllü's case file was transferred to the Homicide Bureau.

On 28 October 2025, Aydın filed a criminal complaint against Güllü's daughter Tuğyan Ülkem Gülter, claiming he had obtained certain confessions. On 4 December, Güllü's neighbor stated in a television program that, after reviewing their home security camera footage, they had seen images suggesting Güllü was pushed and fell, saying: "The footage showing Güllü being pushed was recorded by my camera. I will hand over the footage to the authorities. Let this case be resolved."

On 9 December 2025, Gülter filed a criminal complaint against Ferdi Aydın, his lawyer, and six other individuals on charges of "violating privacy." On the same day, while they were preparing to travel abroad in Büyükçekmece, Istanbul, she and Sultan Nur Ulu—who had been present at the scene during the incident—were detained on charges of "intentional homicide." The suspects were taken to Yalova by police teams, underwent medical checks, and were then taken to the Yalova Police Department for processing. A confidentiality order was imposed on the case file.

On 12 December 2025, Sultan Nur Ulu stated in her testimony to the police that Gülter had pushed her mother, Güllü. Following this development, Gülter's lawyer announced their withdrawal from the case, stating: "We will no longer continue representing Tuğyan. We are fulfilling the promise we made to Mrs. Güllü," thereby stepping down from the defense. On 13 December 2025, Tuğyan Ülkem Gülter was arrested on charges of intentional homicide.

On 2 August 2026, Tuğyan Ülkem Gülter was indicited to a sentence of life imprisonment. On 9 October 2026, the Yalova 1st Heavy Penal Court sentenced Tuğyan to an aggravated life imprisonment for the crime of ""premeditated murder of an ascendant."

== Discography ==
Year	Title	Label	Type
1994	Oyuncak Gibi	Şahin Özer Müzik	Album
1995	Yalan Sevgiler	Şahin Özer Müzik	Album
1996	Değmezmiş Sana	Şahin Özer Müzik	Album
1998	Kırılırım	Şahin Özer Müzik	Album
2000	Zalim Yar	Şahin Özer Müzik	Album
2002	Ve Ben	Şahin Özer Müzik	Album
2004	Hayatımın Yanlışı	Şahin Özer Müzik	Album
2021	Allah Yazdıysa Bozsun	Voce Music	Single
2021	Bu Defa Gidiyorum	Voce Music	Single
2022	Unutamazsın Beni	Musicom Prodüksiyon	Single
2023	Bendeki Sen		Single
2023	Yaşayamam Ki		Single
2024	Olmadı		Single
2025	Farketmez Hesaplaşırız		Single
2025	Sabah Olmadan		Single
2025	Varlığın Yeter		Single
2025	Eylül Zamanı		Single

== Filmography ==
- Ünlüler Çiftliği (2004) - Herself
- Aile Saadeti (2025) - Herself
