= Cobalt (band) =

American black metal band

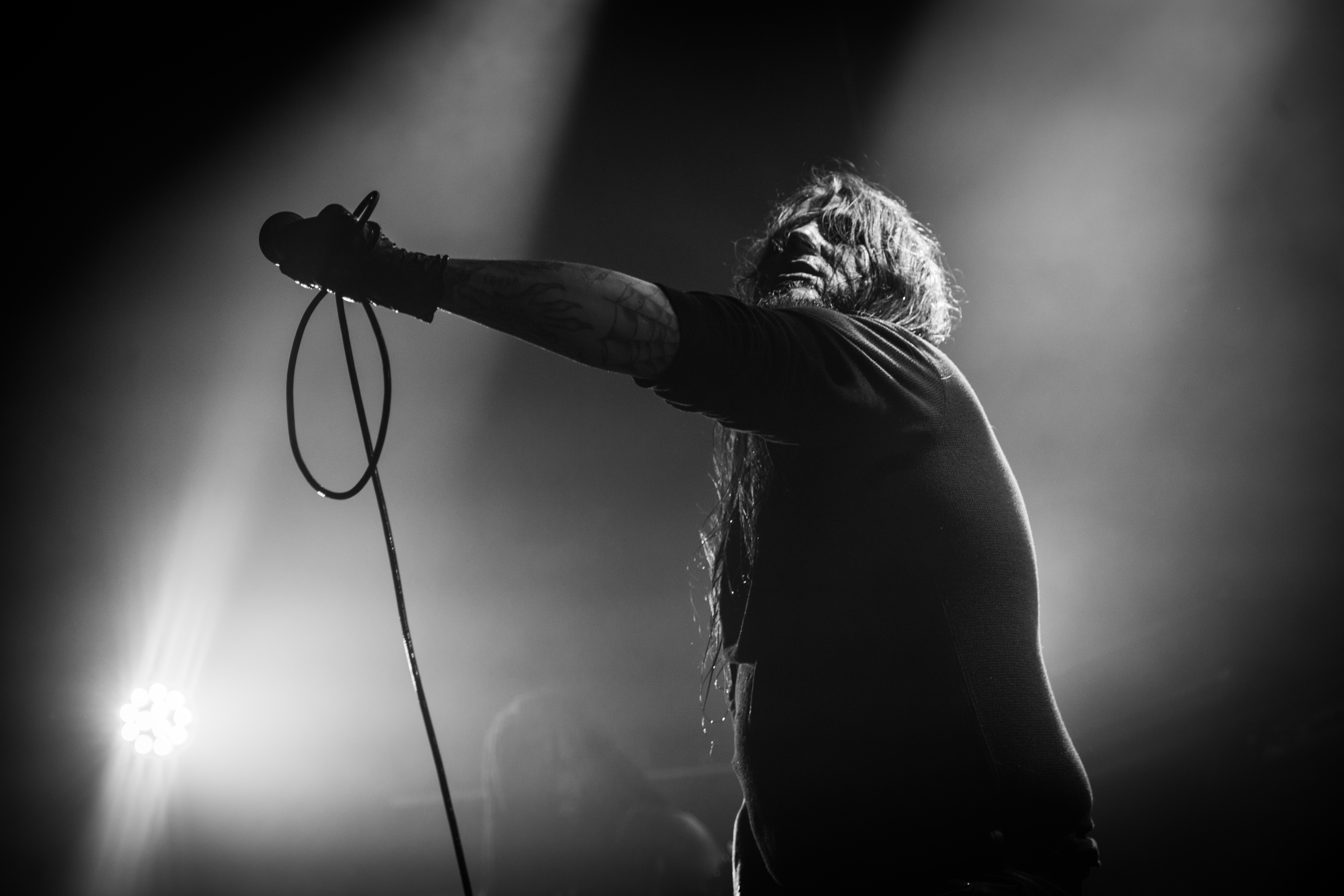
- Cobalt at Roadburn Festival 2017

Background information
- Origin: Greeley, Colorado, United States
- Genre: Black metal
- Years active: 2000–2025
- Label: Profound Lore
- Members: Charlie Fell
- Past members: Phil McSorley; Erik Wunder

Cobalt was an American black metal band from Greeley, Colorado, founded in 2000. Cobalt toured extensively in the US and Europe, including performances at Roadburn Festival in Tilburg, Netherlands and Maryland Deathfest.

== Background ==
Cobalt began as Grimness Enshroud, a solo project of Phil McSorley, who released one demo. Erik Wunder joined the band and the name was changed to Cobalt in 2002. The name was chosen because they "wanted a name that didn't entail anything. Something basic. Something elemental. The name 'Cobalt' leaves room for any variety of directions". Wunder drummed and performed guitars and bass on the studio albums, and played drums live. McSorley provided vocals until 2015, when he split with the band due to personal differences. McSorley was replaced with singer Charlie Fell. Wunder and Fell met at the Jarboe/Nachtmystium European tour in 2010. Fell formerly played bass and vocals in black sludge metal band Lord Mantis. Aside Cobalt, McSorley has served tours of duty with the U.S. army in Iraq and South Korea, while Wunder fronted folk band Man's Gin and played in experimental singer Jarboe's band.

Wunder died from heart failure on July 31, 2025, at the age of 42.

=== Debut and Eater of Birds ===
The first album, War Metal, was raw and primitive black metal with a hint of what Cobalt would become. The following album, Eater of Birds, has been cited as "a great step in the bands evolution". Aside from early 1990s black metal, the album embraced such influences as Neurosis and Swans, with Jarboe (of Swans) making guest appearances on Cobalt's last two albums. Eater of Birds has been described as featuring "70 minute monolith of blasting war metal, massive thrash riffs, drawn-out crescendoes and ritualistic interludes". Both albums were out of print for years and commanded high prices on webstores such as eBay, but in April 2013 Eater of Birds was reissued by Profound Lore.

=== Gin ===
The follow-up to Eater of Birds, Gin, cemented the duo as a forward thinking black metal band. It was released in 2009 to critical acclaim, described as "an album that truly, viscerally expanded the possibilities of black metal, both musically and thematically". Among other accolades, Terrorizer voted it the second best album of 2009. The album was inspired by Ernest Hemingway and Hunter Thompson. The front cover features a young Hemingway in army uniform, whereas the back cover has a bloated and aged Hemingway brandishing the shotgun that he took his life with. A picture of Thompson shooting his typewriter is in the center of the inlay.

=== Slow Forever ===
McSorley stated that the band planned to recording an album following their East Coast tour in May 2013, and that it would be titled Slow Forever.

On March 17, 2014, McSorley announced that he was quitting Cobalt. He gave Wunder his blessing to continue with the project, if Wunder so chose. A month later, McSorley announced that he and Wunder would record Slow Forever and that they had settled their differences.

On December 16, 2014, Wunder announced that McSorley was out of the project due to personal differences and viewpoints that weren't agreeable to the band.

On June 23, 2015, Cobalt revealed that Wunder was recording Slow Forever, with a tentative release date of early 2016. Two days later, Cobalt revealed their new vocalist, Charlie Fell (ex-Lord Mantis). It was confirmed on 26 January 2016, that the album would be released on 25 March 2016, via Profound Lore Records, as a double album.

== Discography ==
- Hammerfight demo (2003)
- War Metal (2005, From Beyond Productions)
- Eater of Birds (2007, Profound Lore)
- Landfill Breastmilk Beast EP (2008, Profound Lore)
- Gin (2009, Profound Lore)
- Slow Forever (2016, Profound Lore)
