= Jack Grassel =

American jazz musician (1948–2026)

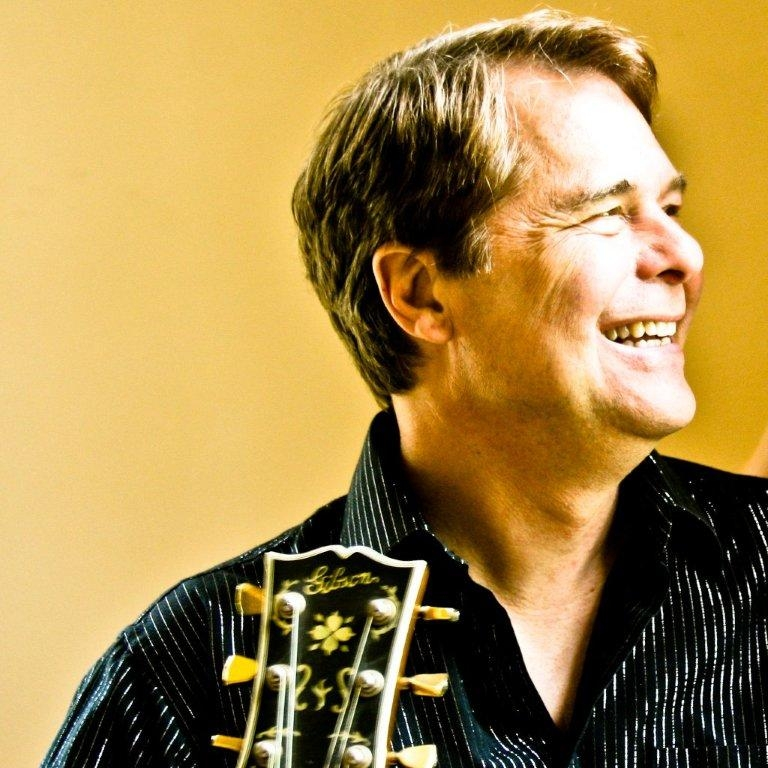

Background information
- Born: September 3, 1948; Milwaukee, Wisconsin, U.S.
- Died: August 26, 2026 (aged 77) Milwaukee, Wisconsin, U.S.
- Genre: Jazz
- Occupations: Musician, teacher
- Instrument: Guitar
- Years active: 1990s–2026
- Label: Frozen Sky

Jack Richard Grassel (September 3, 1948 – August 26, 2026) was an American jazz guitarist, teacher and author from Milwaukee, Wisconsin.

== Life and career ==
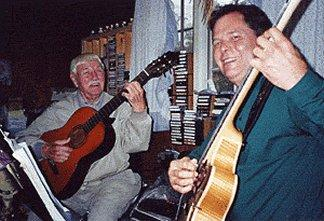
Billy Bauer and Jack Grassel, Long Island, New York, 2001

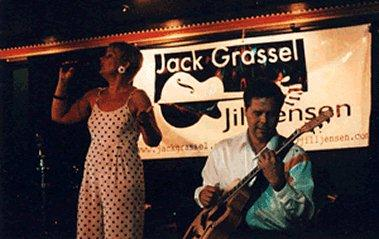
Jill Jensen and Jack Grassel at Caroline's Jazz Club in Milwaukee, Wisconsin, 2002

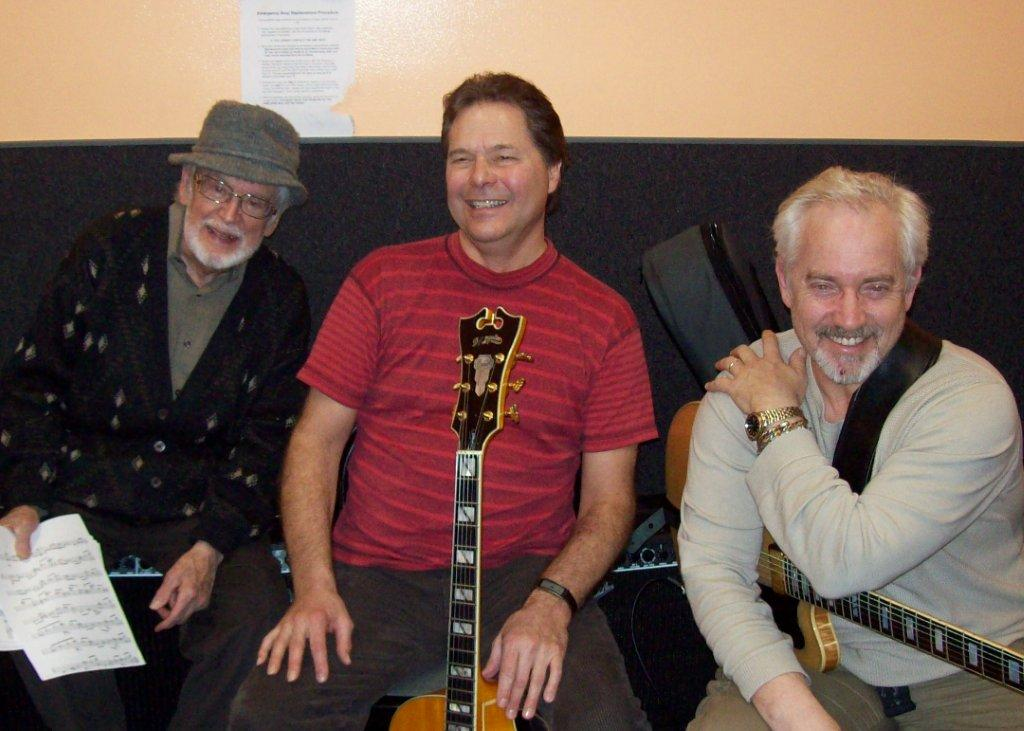
Jimmy Wyble, Jack Grassel, and Sid Jacobs at the Musician's Institute in Hollywood, California, 2009

With a family to support, Grassel turned to teaching music and playing jazz locally. He worked with Rosemary Clooney, Slide Hampton, Stanley Jordan, Ed Thigpen, and Nancy Wilson. He created the Occupational Music degree program at Milwaukee Area Technical College and wrote the books Big Ax and Super Ax. He formed Frozen Sky Records. As a result of the first two records of his compositions "Magic Cereal" and "If You're Too Crazy", he was featured in the New Talent section of Guitar Player magazine and became a contributing writer.

Grassel later invented an instrument he named the "SuperAx" which contained both guitar and bass guitar strings. His friend, guitarist Kirk Tatnall, built one, too, and they recorded the album Live at the Uptowner with their hybrid instruments.

The Hofner guitar company hired Grassel to record a promotional album, Guitar Smoke.

In 2000, readers of Guitar One magazine voted Grassel "one of the 10 best guitarists in America." He married vocalist Jill Jensen, and they recorded five albums: Seems Like Dreams, It's About the Music, Snow People. Live at the Carlton Grange and Jack and Jill Jazz.

Grassel died in a traffic collision on August 26, 2026, at the age of 77.

== Discography ==
- Magic Cereal (Frozen Sky, 1986)
- If You're Too Crazy for You Body (Frozen Sky, 1989)
- Solo Burner (Frozen Sky, 1993)
- Christmas Presence (Frozen Sky, 1998)
- Guitar Smoke (Frozen Sky, 2001)
- Live at the Uptowner (Frozen Sky, 2002)
- Thunderstones (Frozen Sky, 2002)
- Matrix (Frozen Sky, 2003)
- Two Guys with Guitars (Frozen Sky, 2004)
- Ghost Ridge (Frozen Sky, 2002)
- 10 (Frozen Sky, 2006)

== Bibliography ==
- 1974 Guitar Seeds
- 1976 Monster Chops
- 1992 Power Practicing
- 1994 Big Ax
- 1996 Super Ax
- 1998 Jazz Guitar Favorites
- 1998 Jazz Guitar Classics
- 1998 Jazz Guitar Standards
- 2002 Jazz Rhythm Guitar
- 2004 Brain Training
- 2004 131 Axercises
- 2008 70 Jazz Compositions
- 2020 The Reharmonized Real Book
