= 2025 in music =

This topic covers events and articles related to 2025 in music.

== Specific locations ==
- African music
- American music
- British music
- Japanese music
- Philippine music
- Scandinavian music
- South Korean music

== Specific genres ==
- Country
- Heavy metal
- Hip-hop
- Latin
- Progressive rock
- Rock
- Jazz
- K-pop
- J-pop

== Awards ==
67th Annual Grammy Awards (USA)
Record of the Year: "Not Like Us" by Kendrick Lamar • Album of the Year: Cowboy Carter by Beyoncé • Song of the Year: "Not Like Us" by Kendrick Lamar • Best New Artist: Chappell Roan
2025 Brit Awards (UK)
British Album of the Year: Brat by Charli XCX • Song of the Year: "Guess" by Charli XCX featuring Billie Eilish • British Artist of the Year: Charli XCX • Best New Artist: The Last Dinner Party • British Group: Ezra Collective
Juno Awards of 2025 (Canada)
Artist of the Year: Tate McRae • Group of the Year: The Beaches • Album of the Year: Think Later by Tate McRae • Single of the Year: "Exes" by Tate McRae
2025 MTV Video Music Awards Japan (Japan)
Video of the Year: "Lilac" by Mrs. Green Apple • Artist of the Year: Aespa • Song of the Year: "Bling-Bang-Bang-Born" by Creepy Nuts • Album of the Year: Rejoice by Official Hige Dandism
2025 MTV Video Music Awards (USA)
Video of the Year: Brighter Days Ahead by Ariana Grande • Song of the Year: "Apt." by Rosé and Bruno Mars • Best New Artist: Alex Warren • Push Performance of the Year: Katseye
67th Japan Record Awards (Japan)
Grand Prix winner: "Darling" by Mrs. Green Apple
39th Golden Disc Awards (South Korea)
Album of the Year: Spill the Feels by Seventeen • Song of the Year: "Supernova" by Aespa • Rookie Artist of the Year: BabyMonster, Illit, NCT Wish, TWS
Pulitzer Prize for Music (USA)
Sky Islands by Susie Ibarra
Mercury Prize (UK)
People Watching by Sam Fender
Polar Music Prize (Sweden)
Barbara Hannigan • Herbie Hancock • Queen
Rock and Roll Hall of Fame (USA)
Performers: Bad Company • Chubby Checker • Joe Cocker • Cyndi Lauper • Outkast • Soundgarden • The White Stripes Musical Influences: Salt-N-Pepa • Warren Zevon Ahmet Ertegun Award (Non-performers): Lenny Waronker Musical Excellence: Thom Bell • Nicky Hopkins • Carol Kaye
Polaris Music Prize (Canada)
All Cylinders by Yves Jarvis
Eurovision Song Contest 2025 (Europe)
"Wasted Love" by JJ (Austria)
34th Seoul Music Awards (South Korea)
Grand Prize: I-dle • Best Song Award: "Deja Vu" by Tomorrow X Together • Best Album Award: Minisode 3: Tomorrow by Tomorrow X Together • Rookie of the Year: Hearts2Hearts, KickFlip, KiiiKiii
22nd Korean Music Awards (South Korea)
Album of the Year: Hail to the Music by Danpyunsun and the Moments Ensemble • Song of the Year: "Supernova by Aespa • Musician of the Year: Lee Seung-yoon • Rookie of the Year: Sanmanhan
2025 American Music Awards (USA)
Artist of the Year: Billie Eilish • New Artist of the Year: Gracie Abrams • Collaboration of the Year: "Die with a Smile" by Lady Gaga and Bruno Mars

== Bands formed ==
- 3Quency
- AHOF
- AllDay Project
- Ablume
- Close Your Eyes
- Cortis
- Hearts2Hearts
- Hoshi x Woozi
- Idid
- Idntt
- KickFlip
- KiiiKiii
- Kiiras
- Mytro
- Nouera
- Newbeat
- President
- Redievan Stoggs
- Zoc

== Bands reformed ==
- Alabama Shakes
- Alphabeat
- The Band Perry
- The Beta Band
- Black Sabbath (farewell concert only)
- Chapterhouse
- The Click Five
- Fifth Harmony
- GFriend
- Girlset
- Grizzly Bear
- Fountains of Wayne
- I Killed the Prom Queen
- letlive
- Mameshiba no Taigun
- Minus the Bear
- Momoland
- Rilo Kiley
- Rush
- Sugar
- Triumph

== Bands disbanded ==
- 12 Rods
- Amadou & Mariam
- Andy & Lucas
- As One
- Bis
- Black Sabbath
- Bury Your Dead
- Cannabis Corpse
- Coin
- Crystal Viper
- Dempagumi.inc
- Eternal Tears of Sorrow
- Flo and Eddie
- Gel
- Jesus Piece
- The International Swingers
- Ithaca
- KAT-TUN
- Kind of Like Spitting
- Luminous
- Lynch Mob
- Mew
- Murder by Death
- One Morning Left
- Orange Goblin
- Ozzy Osbourne Band
- Porridge Radio
- Purple Kiss
- The Pillows
- REO Speedwagon
- Refused
- Sarke
- The Searchers
- Shopping
- Soft Cell
- Sum 41
- Superkind
- Stray From the Path
- Tapir!
- Tennis
- Thank You, I'm Sorry
- Tokio
- The Turtles
- Void of Vision
- Whitesnake
- You Me At Six

== Deaths ==
=== January ===
- 1
  - Leo Dan, 82, Argentine singer-songwriter
  - Jean-Michel Defaye, 92, French classical pianist, composer, arranger and conductor
  - Chad Morgan, 91, Australian country singer and guitarist
  - Nora Orlandi, 91, Italian classical pianist, violinist, singer and film composer
  - Wayne Osmond, 73, American pop singer (The Osmonds)
- 2
  - Wilhelm Brückner, 92, German luthier
  - Russ North, 59, English heavy metal singer (Cloven Hoof)
  - Ferdi Tayfur, 79, Turkish classical singer and multi-instrumentalist
- 3
  - Willem van Kooten, 83, Dutch radio DJ
  - Peter Schaap, 78, Dutch levenslied singer
  - Brenton Wood, 83, American soul singer
- 4
  - Ed Askew, 84, American folk singer-songwriter
  - Dylan Thomas More, American industrial rock sampler and programmer (Chemlab)
- 5
  - Beej Chaney, 68, American punk and new wave singer-songwriter (The Suburbs)
  - Fredrik Lindgren, 53, Swedish heavy metal guitarist (Unleashed, Terra Firma)
- 6
  - Hope Foye, 103, American folk singer
  - Stella Greka, 102, Greek pop singer
- 7
  - Ayla Erduran, 90, Turkish classical violinist
  - Peter Yarrow, 86, American folk singer-songwriter (Peter, Paul and Mary)
- 9
  - Laurie Holloway, 86, English jazz pianist, television musical director, and composer.
  - P. Jayachandran, 80, Indian playback singer.
  - Doc Shebeleza, 51, South African kwaito singer
- 10 – Sam Moore, 89, American soul singer-songwriter (Sam & Dave)
- 11
  - Mario Klemens, 88, Czech classical conductor
  - Fereydoon Shahbazyan, 82, Iranian classical composer, conductor, and multi-instrumentalist
- 12 – Mark Izu, 70, American jazz double bass player and composer
- 13
  - P. Fluid, 64, American funk metal singer (24-7 Spyz)
  - Elgar Howarth, 89, English classical conductor, composer and trumpeter (death announced on this date)
  - Buck White, 94, American country and bluegrass singer and mandolinist (The Whites)
- 14 – Teddy Osei, 87, Ghanaian jazz rock saxophonist (Osibisa)
- 15
  - Tommy Dix, 101, American musical theater singer
  - Melba Montgomery, 86, American country singer-songwriter.
  - Linda Nolan, 65, Irish pop singer (The Nolans)
- 17 – Stéphane Venne, 83, Canadian pop singer-songwriter, arranger and producer
- 18 – Claire van Kampen, 71, English theater composer (Royal Shakespeare Company)
- 20
  - Bob Kuban, 84, American R&B drummer
  - John Sykes, 65, English hard rock guitarist (Tygers of Pan Tang, Thin Lizzy, Whitesnake) (death announced on this date)
- 21
  - Elliot Ingber, 83, American psychedelic rock guitarist (The Mothers of Invention, Fraternity of Man, The Magic Band).
  - Garth Hudson, 87, Canadian rock multi-instrumentalist (The Band)
- 22
  - Paddy Cole, 85, Irish showband saxophonist
  - Barry Goldberg, 83, American blues and rock keyboardist (The Electric Flag, The Rides)
  - Johan Slager, 78, Dutch progressive rock guitarist (Kayak) (death announced on this date)
  - Gabriel Yacoub, 72, French folk singer (Malicorne)
- 24 – Unk, 43, American rapper
- 25 – Edweena Banger, British punk rock singer (The Nosebleeds, Slaughter & The Dogs) (death announced on this date)
- 26
  - Kazuyoshi Akiyama, 84, Japanese classical conductor
  - Betsy Arakawa, 65, American classical pianist (body discovered on this date)
  - Gary Grier, American R&B singer (The Contours)
- 27
  - Emilia Contessa, 67, Indonesian dangdut and pop singer
  - Aaron Rossi, 44, American industrial metal drummer (Ministry, Prong, John 5)
- 29 – Bruce Howe, 77, Australian progressive rock bassist and singer (Fraternity)
- 30
  - Marianne Faithfull, 78, English pop and rock singer-songwriter
  - İlhan Usmanbaş, 104, Turkish contemporary classical composer
- 31 – Susan Alcorn, 71–72, American avant garde composer and pedal steel guitarist (death announced on this date)

=== February ===
- 1
  - Peter Bassano, 79–80, English classical trombonist and conductor
  - André Ducret, 79, Swiss classical singer and composer
  - Sal Maida, 76, American rock bassist (Milk 'N' Cookies, Roxy Music, Sparks)
  - Peter Schmidl, 84, Austrian classical clarinetist
- 2
  - Gene Barge, 98, American rock and roll saxophonist
  - Barbie Hsu, 48, Taiwanese pop singer
  - Patricia Johnson, 95, English opera singer (death announced on this date)
  - Stéphane Picq, 59, French video game music composer
  - Paul Plishka, 83, American opera singer
- 4
  - Bob Bennett, American garage rock drummer (The Sonics)
  - Ana María Iriarte, 98, Spanish opera singer
  - Wily Mignon, 38, Beninese pop singer
- 5
  - Irv Gotti, 54, American record producer and executive (Murder Inc. Records)
  - Dave Jerden, 75, American record producer, audio engineer and mixer
  - Hans-Peter Lehmann, 90, German opera director
  - Mike Ratledge, 81, British psychedelic rock keyboardist (Soft Machine)
- 6 – Bobby Hamilton, American R&B singer (The Choice Four) (death announced on this date)
- 7
  - Naâman, 34, French reggae singer
  - Song Dae-kwan, 78, South Korean trot singer
- 8 – Corey Crewe, 80, Canadian comedic music singer (Corey and Trina)
- 9 – Edith Mathis, 86, Swiss opera singer
- 10 – Maria Tipo, 93, Italian classical pianist
- 12
  - Tommy Hunt, 91, American soul singer (The Flamingos)
  - Jimi Mbaye, 67, Senegalese mbalax guitarist
- 13 – Sukri Bommagowda, 88, Indian folk singer
- 16 – Vladimír Válek, 89, Czech classical conductor
- 17
  - Rick Buckler, 69, English new wave drummer (The Jam)
  - Jamie Muir, 82, Scottish progressive rock percussionist (King Crimson)
  - Paquita la del Barrio, 77, Mexican pop singer
- 19
  - Karl Cochran, American rock guitarist (Eric Singer Project)
  - Snowy Fleet, 79, English-born Australian rock drummer (The Easybeats)
  - Jean Sarrus, 79, French comedy rock singer (Les Charlots)
- 20
  - Gerry Arling, 63, Dutch electronic multi-instrumentalist (Arling & Cameron) (death announced on this date)
  - Jerry Butler, 85, American soul singer-songwriter (The Impressions)
  - Ilkka Kuusisto, 91, Finnish opera composer, conductor, choirmaster, and organist
- 21
  - Fred Bekky, 81, Belgian rock singer and guitarist (The Pebbles)
  - Bill Fay, 81, English folk rock singer-songwriter
  - Khalil Fong, 41, Hong Kong mandopop singer-songwriter
  - Gwen McCrae, 81, American soul and disco singer (death announced on this date)
- 22
  - Ken Parker, 76, Jamaican reggae singer
  - Gianni Pettenati, 79, Italian pop rock singer
- 23
  - Jacques de Jongh, Australian glam rock guitarist and bassist (Hush)
  - Chris Jasper, 73, American R&B singer-songwriter and keyboardist (The Isley Brothers, Isley-Jasper-Isley)
- 24
  - Roberta Flack, 88, American soul and jazz singer-songwriter and keyboardist
  - Robert John, 79, American soft rock singer-songwriter
  - Ricardo Kanji, 76, Brazilian classical flautist
- 25
  - Simon Lindley, 76, English classical organist, choirmaster, conductor and composer
  - Coburn Pharr, 62, Canadian thrash metal singer (Annihilator)
  - Ferenc Rados, 90, Hungarian classical pianist
- 28 – David Johansen, 75, American rock singer-songwriter (New York Dolls)

=== March ===
- 1
  - Joey Molland, 77, English power pop guitarist (Badfinger) and songwriter
  - Paulito FG, 63, Cuban salsa and timba singer
  - Bill Smith, Scottish folk singer (The Corries)
  - Angie Stone, 63, American neo-soul singer-songwriter and rapper (The Sequence)
- 2
  - Edip Akbayram, 74, Turkish folk and rock singer-songwriter
  - Herbert Léonard, 80, French pop singer
  - Frank Maher, 90, Canadian folk accordionist
- 3
  - Geraint Jarman, 74, Welsh rock singer-songwriter
  - Jean-Marie Londeix, 92, French classical saxophonist
  - Jeffrey Runnings, 61, American post-punk singer-songwriter and bassist (For Against)
  - Bob Rupe, 68, American alternative rock bassist (The Silos, Cracker, House of Freaks, Sparklehorse)
- 4
  - Roy Ayers, 84, American jazz singer, vibraphonist, keyboardist and record producer
  - Harry Elston, 86, American soul singer (The Friends of Distinction)
  - Mario Trabucco, 73, Italian classical violinist
- 5
  - Edesio Alejandro, 66, Cuban film composer
  - Randy Brown, 72, American R&B singer (death announced on this date)
  - DJ Funk, 53, American ghetto house DJ (death announced on this date)
- 6
  - Brian James, 70, English punk rock guitarist and songwriter (The Damned, The Lords of the New Church)
  - Troy Seals, 86, American country singer-songwriter and guitarist
- 7
  - Danny Cox, 81, American folk rock singer-songwriter
  - D'Wayne Wiggins, 64, American R&B singer and guitarist (Tony! Toni! Toné!)
- 8
  - Bill Ashton, 88, British jazz saxophonist, band leader and composer
  - Beau Dozier, 45, American R&B and hip hop songwriter and record producer (death announced on this date)
  - Donald Hazelwood, 95, Australian classical violinist
  - Harbans Jandu, Indian lyricist
  - Naima Samih, 71, Moroccan khaliji singer
- 10
  - Stedman Pearson, 60, British pop singer (Five Star)
  - Wheesung, 43, South Korean R&B singer (body discovered on this date)
- 11
  - Cocoa Tea, 65, Jamaican reggae singer-songwriter
  - Bob Rivers, 68, American radio personality and parody musician
- 13
  - Sofia Gubaidulina, 93, Soviet/Russian composer of modernist and modernist/sacred music
  - Mark Holder, 52, American blues guitarist (Black Diamond Heavies)
  - Yallunder, 30, South African afro-soul singer-songwriter
- 14 – Bruno Romani, 65, Italian jazz saxophonist, flutist and composer
- 15 – Les Binks, 73, Northern Irish heavy metal drummer (Judas Priest)
- 16
  - Dandy Bestia, 72, Italian comedy punk guitarist (Skiantos)
  - Rob de Nijs, 82, Dutch pop singer
  - Andrej Gjorgieski, Macedonian hip hop singer (DNK)
  - Jesse Colin Young, 83, American folk rock singer-songwriter (The Youngbloods)
- 17
  - AnNa R., 55, German pop singer (Rosenstolz, Gleis 8) (death announced on this date)
  - Peter Farrelly, 76, Northern Irish progressive rock bassist and singer (Fruupp)
  - Aurelio Martínez, 55, Honduran garifuna singer and guitarist
- 18 – Bedros Kirkorov, 92, Bulgarian-Russian pop singer
- 20
  - Eddie Adcock, 86, American bluegrass banjo player (The Country Gentlemen)
  - Oleg Baranov, 57, Russian alternative rock guitarist (Tequilajazzz)
  - Leanne Cowie, Australian garage rock drummer (The Scientists)
- 21 – Larry Tamblyn, 82, American garage rock singer and keyboardist (The Standells)
- 22
  - Andy Peebles, 76, English radio DJ
  - Paul Wagstaff, British alternative dance guitarist (Paris Angels, Black Grape) (death announced on this date)
- 23 – Kevan Staples, 74, Canadian alternative rock guitarist and singer (Rough Trade)
- 24
  - Alan Cuckston, 85, English classical harpsichordist (death announced on this date)
  - Huey Williams, 86, American gospel singer (Jackson Southernaires)
- 25
  - Tapani Kansa, 76, Finnish pop singer
  - Sanjida Khatun, 91, Bangladeshi musicologist
  - Terry Manning, 77, American recording engineer and producer
  - Alice Tan Ridley, 72, American gospel and R&B singer
- 26
  - Shushama Das, 94, Bangladeshi folk singer
  - Tommy Rey, 80, Chilean cumbia singer (Sonora Palacios)
- 28 – Young Scooter, 39, American rapper
- 29
  - Richard Chamberlain, 90, American pop singer
  - Dick Damron, 91, Canadian country singer-songwriter
  - Tracy Schwarz, 86, American old-time singer (New Lost City Ramblers)
- 30
  - Enrique Bátiz, 82, Mexican classical conductor and pianist
  - Marinko Colnago, 83, Croatian pop singer (Novi fosili)
- 31
  - J Nyi Nyi, 71, Burmese pop singer
  - Volkan Konak, 58, Turkish folk singer
  - John Nelson, 83, American classical conductor

=== April ===
- 1
  - George Freeman, 97, American jazz guitarist
  - Wayne Handy, 89, American rock and roll singer
  - Michael Hurley, 83, American folk singer-songwriter
  - Alfi Kabiljo, 89, Croatian classical composer
  - Johnny Tillotson, 86, American country singer-songwriter
- 4 – Amadou Bagayoko, 70, Malian worldbeat singer and guitarist (Amadou & Mariam)
- 5
  - Dave Allen, 69, English post-punk bassist (Gang of Four, Shriekback, King Swamp)
  - Pasha Technique, 40, Russian rapper
- 6
  - Al Barile, 63, American hardcore punk guitarist (SSD)
  - Clem Burke, 70, American new wave drummer (Blondie)
  - Roberto De Simone, 91, Italian composer and musicologist
  - Anna Slováčková, 29, Czech pop singer
  - Pongsri Woranuch, 85, Thai luk thung singer
- 7 – William Finn, 73, American composer and lyricist
- 8
  - Rubby Pérez, 69, Dominican merengue singer
  - Lenny Welch, 86, American pop singer
- 9
  - Roberto Cani, 57, Italian classical violinist
  - Terje Venaas, 78, Norwegian jazz bassist
- 10
  - Niklas Eklund, 56, Swedish classical trumpeter
  - Titiek Puspa, 87, Indonesian pop singer-songwriter
  - Nino Tempo, 90, American pop singer and saxophonist (Nino Tempo & April Stevens, The Wrecking Crew)
  - Drew Zingg, 68, American rock guitarist (death announced on this date)
- 11
  - Mike Berry, 82, English pop singer
  - Max Romeo, 80, Jamaican reggae singer
- 12
  - Roy Thomas Baker, 78, English record producer
  - Pilita Corrales, 85, Filipino pop singer
- 14
  - Jed the Fish, 69, American radio DJ
  - Peter Seiffert, 71, German opera singer
- 16
  - Nora Aunor, 71, Filipino pop singer
  - Colin Berry, 79, British radio DJ
  - Mac Gayden, 83, American rock and country singer-songwriter and guitarist
  - Joel Krosnick, 84, American classical cellist (Juilliard String Quartet) (death announced on this date)
- 17
  - Peter Ablinger, 66, Austrian classical composer
  - Nuno Guerreiro, 52, Portuguese pop singer (Ala dos Namorados)
  - Roger McLachlan, 71, New Zealand pop rock bassist (Little River Band) (death announced on this date)
- 18 – Clodagh Rodgers, 78, Northern Irish pop singer
- 19 – Ricky Siahaan, 48, Indonesian heavy metal guitarist (Seringai)
- 20
  - Cristina Buarque, 74, Brazilian samba singer and composer
  - Kimble Rendall, 67–68, Australian post-punk and alternative rock singer and guitarist (XL Capris, Hoodoo Gurus) (death announced on this date)
- 21 – Hajji Alejandro, 70, Filipino pop singer
- 22
  - David Briggs, 82, American rock and country keyboardist (Muscle Shoals Rhythm Section, The Nashville A-Team, TCB Band)
  - Odd Magne Gridseth, 65, Norwegian jazz bassist
- 23
  - Lulu Roman, 78, American country and southern gospel singer
  - David Thomas, 71, American rock singer-songwriter (Pere Ubu, Rocket from the Tombs)
- 24
  - Peter McIan, American rock keyboardist (The City) and record producer (death announced on this date)
  - Roy Phillips, 83, British jazz pop singer and keyboardist (The Peddlers)
- 25 – Richard Wernick, 91, American classical composer
- 26
  - Charles Beare, 87, British luthier and violin expert
  - Andy Bey, 85, American jazz singer and pianist
- 27 – Wizz Jones, 86, English folk singer-songwriter and guitarist
- 28
  - Brian Montana, 60, American death metal guitarist (Possessed)
  - Mike Peters, 66, Welsh alternative rock singer-songwriter (The Alarm)
- 29 – Christfried Schmidt, 92, German classical composer and arranger
- 30
  - Kari Løvaas, 85, Norwegian opera singer (death announced on this date)
  - Joe Louis Walker, 75, American blues singer-songwriter and guitarist

=== May ===
- 1
  - Nana Caymmi, 84, Brazilian MPB singer
  - Jill Sobule, 66, American folk and alternative rock singer-songwriter
- 2 – Karel Bláha, 77, Czech opera singer
- 5
  - May Abrahamse, 94, South African opera singer
  - James Baker, 71, Australian rock drummer (The Victims, The Scientists, Hoodoo Gurus, Beasts of Bourbon)
  - Nathan Jerde, American garage rock drummer (The Ponys)
  - Squire Parsons, 77, American Southern gospel singer-songwriter
- 6
  - Luigi Lopez, 77, Italian pop singer-songwriter
  - Vakhtang Machavariani, 74, Georgian classical composer and conductor
- 7 – Ronald Corp, 74, British classical composer and conductor
- 8 – Xatar, 43, Kurdish-German rapper
- 9
  - Stewart Francke, 66, American pop singer-songwriter
  - Johnny Rodriguez, 73, American country singer
- 10
  - Matthew Best, 68, British choral singer and conductor
  - Larry Lee, 78, American country rock multi-instrumentalist (The Ozark Mountain Daredevils)
  - Kafon, 41–42, Tunisian rapper
- 11
  - John Edwards, 80, American R&B singer (The Spinners)
  - Leila Negra, 95, German pop singer
  - Alena Veselá, 101, Czech classical organist and musical teacher
- 12
  - Ernst Mahle, 96, German-Brazilian orchestra composer and conductor
  - Yasunao Tone, 90, Japanese jazz composer and sound artist
- 13 – Billy Earheart, 71, American country keyboardist (The Amazing Rhythm Aces, The Bama Band)
- 14 – Dale Henderson, 59, American thrash metal singer (Beowülf) (death announced on this date)
- 15
  - Luigi Alva, 98, Peruvian opera singer
  - Junior Byles, 77, Jamaican reggae singer
  - Terry Draper, 73, Canadian progressive rock singer-songwriter and drummer (Klaatu)
  - Charles Strouse, 96, American musical theater composer and lyricist
- 16 – Jadwiga Rappé, 73, Polish opera singer
- 17
  - Rodney Brown, 78, American funk drummer (Dyke and the Blazers)
  - Roger Nichols, 84, American pop songwriter, composer and multi-instrumentalist
  - Werenoi, 31, French rapper
- 19
  - Heorhiy Gina, 93, Ukrainian classical composer, conductor, and violinst
  - Chris Hager, 67, American glam metal guitarist (Rough Cutt, Mickey Ratt) (death announced on this date)
  - Adam Ramey, 31, American nu metal singer (Dropout Kings)
- 20
  - Mark Greene, American R&B singer (The Moments) (death announced on this date)
  - Michael B. Tretow, 80, Swedish record producer, sound engineer and composer
  - Frank Gibson Jr., 79, New Zealand jazz drummer
- 22
  - James Lowe, 82, American psychedelic rock singer (The Electric Prunes)
  - Dave Shapiro, 42, American music agent
  - Dan Storper, 74, American record label executive (Putumayo World Music)
  - Daniel Williams, American metalcore drummer (The Devil Wears Prada)
- 23 – Lillian Boutté, 75, American jazz singer
- 24 – Kenny Marco, 78, Canadian rock guitarist (Grant Smith & The Power, Motherlode, Blood, Sweat & Tears)
- 25
  - Simon House, 76, English progressive rock keyboardist and violinist (Hawkwind, Third Ear Band)
  - Michael Sumler, 71, American choreographer and stylist (Kool & the Gang)
  - Foday Musa Suso, 75, Gambian mandé singer and kora player
- 26
  - Gigi Canu, 66, Italian electronic dance guitarist (Planet Funk)
  - Rick Derringer, 77, American rock singer-songwriter and guitarist (The McCoys)
- 27
  - Freddie Aguilar, 72, Filipino pop singer-songwriter
  - Brian Kellock, 62, Scottish jazz pianist
  - Irianti Erningpraja, 59, Indonesian pop singer-songwriter
- 28
  - Al Foster, 82, American jazz drummer
  - Per Nørgård, 92, Danish classical composer and music theorist
- 29
  - Alf Clausen, 84, American television composer
  - Susann McDonald, 90, American classical harpist
  - Charles Wadsworth, 96, American classical pianist
- 30 – Renée Victor, 86, American pop singer
- 31 – Marcie Jones, 79, Australian pop singer (Marcie and The Cookies) (death announced on this date)

=== June ===
- 1
  - Aharon Amram, 91, Yemeni-born Israeli traditional music singer and composer
  - Monica Nielsen, 87, Swedish pop singer
- 2
  - Nicole David, 51, Saint Lucian soca singer
  - Colin Jerwood, 63, English anarcho-punk singer (Conflict)
- 3 – Eugen Doga, 88, Moldovan film and theatre composer
- 4
  - Nicole Croisille, 88, French pop singer
  - Arthur Hamilton, 98, American pop songwriter (death announced on this date)
  - Frankie Jordan, 86, French rock and roll singer
  - Raymond Warren, 96, British classical composer
- 5
  - Bob Andrews, 75, English new wave keyboardist (Brinsley Schwarz, The Rumour)
  - Anatoly Gunitsky, 71, Russian rock lyricist (Aquarium) (death announced on this date)
  - Norman Hutchins, 62, American gospel singer-songwriter
  - Wayne Lewis, 68, American R&B singer-songwriter and keyboardist (Atlantic Starr)
- 6 – Mike Ejeagha, 95, Nigerian folk singer and guitarist
- 8 – Ariel Kalma, 78, French new age composer (death announced on this date)
- 9
  - Axel Skalstad, 32, Norwegian jazz drummer
  - Sly Stone, 82, American funk singer-songwriter and multi-instrumentalist (Sly and the Family Stone)
- 10 – Don Moore, 86, American jazz bassist.
- 11
  - Douglas McCarthy, 58, English EBM singer-songwriter (Nitzer Ebb)
  - Brian Wilson, 82, American pop rock singer-songwriter, bassist and keyboardist (The Beach Boys)
- 13
  - Louis Moholo, 85, South African jazz drummer (The Blue Notes, Brotherhood of Breath, Assagai)
  - Honest John Plain, 73, English punk rock guitarist and singer (The Boys)
- 14
  - Bira Presidente^{(pt)}, 88, Brazilian samba singer-songwriter and percussionist (Fundo de Quintal)
  - Kollangudi Karuppayee, 99, Indian folk singer
  - Steven Leckie, 67, Canadian punk rock singer (The Viletones)
  - Cocoy Laurel, 71, Filipino pop singer and pianist
- 15
  - Petroloukas Chalkias, 90, Greek traditional music clarinettist.
  - Sven-Åke Johansson, 81–82, Swedish free jazz drummer and composer (death announced on this date)
  - Masuiyama Daishirō II, 76, Japanese enka singer
  - Barry Vercoe, 87, New Zealand jazz and electronic composer
- 16
  - Hélio Delmiro, 78, Brazilian jazz guitarist
  - Patti Drew, 80, American R&B singer
  - John Reid, 61, Scottish acid jazz singer-songwriter (Nightcrawlers) (death announced on this date)
- 17
  - Alfred Brendel, 94, Czech-born Austrian classical pianist
  - Charles Burrell, 104, American classical and jazz bassist
- 18 – Lou Christie, 82, American pop and soft rock singer-songwriter
- 19
  - Geirr Lystrup, 76, Norwegian visa singer (death announced on this date)
  - James Prime, 64, Scottish pop rock keyboardist (Deacon Blue)
  - Ron Woodbridge, 87, English pop rock singer (The Searchers) (death announced on this date)
  - Cavin Yarbrough, 72, American R&B singer (Yarbrough and Peoples)
- 20
  - David L. Hamilton, 74, American progressive rock keyboardist and composer (Pavlov's Dog)
  - Patrick Walden, 46, English indie rock guitarist (Babyshambles)
- 23
  - Rebekah Del Rio, 57, American pop singer-songwriter
  - Feya Faku, 63, South African jazz trumpeter and flugelhornist
  - Yuriy Parfyonov, 79, Russian jazz and alternative rock trumpeter (Auktyon)
  - Mick Ralphs, 81, English rock guitarist and songwriter (Mott the Hoople, Bad Company) (death announced on this date)
- 24
  - Serge Fiori, 73, Canadian progressive rock singer and guitarist (Harmonium)
  - Bobby Sherman, 81, American pop singer
- 26
  - Ocasional Talento, 29, Bolivian rapper
  - Lalo Schifrin, 93, Argentine-born American film and television composer
  - Walter Scott, 81, American R&B singer (The Whispers)
- 27 – Derek A. E. Fuhrmann, 44, American rock singer-songwriter (The Crash Motive)
- 29 – Stuart Burrows, 92, Welsh opera singer

=== July ===
- 1
  - Brendan Berg, 42, Canadian indie pop bassist (Royal Canoe)
  - Hamdan ATT, 79, Indonesian dangdut singer
  - Jimmy Swaggart, 90, American gospel singer
- 2 – Verka Siderova, 99, Bulgarian folk singer
- 3 – Dany Lademacher, 75, Belgian rock guitarist (Herman Brood and his Wild Romance, Vitesse, The Radios)
- 4
  - Luís Jardim, 75, Portuguese pop rock percussionist and bassist
  - Mark Snow, 78, American film and television composer
  - Young Noble, 47, American rapper (Outlawz)
- 7 – Mosie Burks, 92, American gospel singer (Mississippi Mass Choir)
- 8 – Tim Cronin, 63, American stoner rock drummer (Monster Magnet)
- 9 – Ihor Poklad, 83, Ukrainian composer
- 11
  - Toni Cruz, 78, Spanish pop singer
  - Raymond Guiot, 94, French classical and jazz flutist, pianist and composer
  - David Kaff, 79, British rock keyboardist (Rare Bird, Spinal Tap)
  - Iris Williams, 79, Welsh jazz singer (death announced on this date)
- 13 – Dave Cousins, 85, English folk rock singer-songwriter and guitarist (Strawbs)
- 14 – Matt Keil, Canadian hardcore punk bassist (Comeback Kid) (death announced on this date)
- 15 – Billy April, 61, British dance producer and remixer (Driza Bone) (death announced on this date)
- 16
  - Chris Faiumu, New Zealand reggae dub percussionist (Fat Freddy's Drop)
  - Connie Francis, 87, American pop singer
  - Gary Karr, 83, American classical bassist
  - Eero Raittinen, 80, Finnish pop rock singer (The Boys)
- 17
  - Alan Bergman, 99, American pop composer and songwriter
  - Robbie Pardlo, 46, American R&B singer-songwriter (City High)
  - Daphne Walker, 94, New Zealand pop singer
- 18
  - Helen Cornelius, 83, American country singer-songwriter
  - Roger Norrington, 91, British classical conductor
- 19
  - Frank Maffei, 85, American doo-wop singer (Danny & the Juniors)
  - Aldo Monges, 83, Argentine folk singer
  - Rezeda Sharafieva, 59, Russian theater singer
  - Rustem Suleymanov, 47, Russian classical violinist and conductor
  - Béatrice Uria-Monzon, 61, French opera singer
- 20
  - Preta Gil, 50, Brazilian pop singer
  - Owen Gray, 86, Jamaican ska and reggae singer
  - Malcolm-Jamal Warner, 54, American jazz poet and bassist
- 21
  - Eamon Downes, 56, British breakbeat hardcore DJ (Liquid) (death announced on this date)
  - David Rendall, 76, English opera singer
- 22
  - Chuck Mangione, 84, American smooth jazz flugelhornist
  - Ozzy Osbourne, 76, English heavy metal singer-songwriter (Black Sabbath)
  - John Palmer, 82, English progressive rock multi-instrumentalist (Family, Blossom Toes, Bakerloo) (death announced on this date)
- 23
  - George Kooymans, 77, Dutch rock guitarist and songwriter (Golden Earring)
  - George Veikoso, 55, Fijian ska and reggae singer-songwriter
- 24
  - Cleo Laine, 97, English jazz singer
  - Amalia Macías, 91, Mexican ranchera singer
  - Tommy McLain, 85, American swamp pop singer-songwriter
- 26
  - Tom Lehrer, 97, American comedy and satire singer-songwriter and pianist
  - Daddy Lumba, 60, Ghanaian highlife singer-songwriter
  - Jock McDonald, 69, Scottish punk rock singer (Bollock Brothers)
  - Ziad Rahbani, 69, Lebanese composer and pianist
- 27 – Celso Valli, 75, Italian record producer and composer
- 28 – Rosita Velázquez, 74, Puerto Rican nueva trova singer (Moliendo Vidrio)
- 29
  - Paul Mario Day, 69, English heavy metal singer (Iron Maiden, More)
  - Livio Macchia, 83, Italian pop singer and guitarist (I Camaleonti)
- 31
  - Jesto, 41, Italian rapper
  - Flaco Jiménez, 86, American tejano singer-songwriter and accordionist
  - Erik Wunder, 42, American black metal and folk rock multi-instrumentalist (Cobalt, Man's Gin)

=== August ===
- 1
  - David Roach, 59, American heavy metal singer (Junkyard)
  - Jeannie Seely, 85, American country singer
- 2 – Howie Tee, 61, English-born American hip-hop DJ and producer
- 4
  - Larry Gillstrom, 68, Canadian heavy metal guitarist (Kick Axe)
  - Jane Morgan, 101, American pop singer
  - Terry Reid, 75, English rock singer-songwriter and guitarist
- 5
  - Col Joye, 89, Australian rock and pop singer-songwriter
  - Nancy King, 85, American jazz singer
  - Lee Min, 47, South Korean R&B singer (As One) (body discovered on this date)
- 6 – Eddie Palmieri, 88, American jazz pianist, composer and bandleader
- 8
  - Judy Bailey, 89, New Zealand-Australian jazz pianist
  - Arlindo Cruz, 66, Brazilian samba singer-songwriter and guitarist (Fundo de Quintal)
  - Robert Jaramillo, 78, American rock singer (Cannibal & the Headhunters)
- 9 – NoB, 61, Japanese hard rock singer (Make-Up, Project.R)
- 10
  - Graham Fenton, 76, English rockabilly singer (Matchbox)
  - Bobby Whitlock, 77, American rock singer-songwriter and keyboardist (Derek and the Dominos, Delaney & Bonnie and Friends)
- 11
  - Celso Garrido Lecca, 99, Peruvian classical composer
  - Chuck Girard, 81, American Christian rock singer and pianist (Love Song, The Castells, The Hondells)
  - Choo Hoey, 90, Singaporean classical violinist and conductor
  - Sheila Jordan, 96, American jazz singer
  - Gabi Novak, 89, Croatian pop singer
- 12 – Cool John Ferguson, 71, American blues singer-songwriter and guitarist
- 13
  - Rachid Ferhani, 80, Algerian Kabyle singer
  - Mathias Grassow, 62, German ambient keyboardist
  - Klaus Wirzenius, 37, Finnish rock singer and guitarist
- 14 – Roy Estrada, 82, American rock bassist (The Mothers of Invention, Little Feat, Captain Beefheart & The Magic Band)
- 15
  - Maria Krushelnytska, 90, Ukrainian classical pianist
  - Jamshied Sharifi, 64, American classical composer and multi-instrumentalist
- 16 – Joachim Grubich, 90, Polish classical organist
- 17 – Joe Hickerson, 89, American folk singer
- 18
  - Aesop The Black Wolf, American rapper (Living Legends) (death announced on this date)
  - Banu Kırbağ, 74, Turkish pop singer
- 19
  - Michael Antunes, 85, American rock saxophonist (John Cafferty and the Beaver Brown Band, Ernie and the Automatics)
  - Luz, 32, Japanese pop rock singer
- 20
  - Brent Hinds, 51, American metal singer and guitarist (Mastodon, Giraffe Tongue Orchestra)
  - Frank Øren, 59, Norwegian a capella singer (Bjelleklang)
- 21
  - Salvador Aguilar, 56, Mexican rock singer (Coda)
  - Stanisław Sojka, 66, Polish jazz and pop singer, pianist and composer
- 22
  - Miguel Proença, 86, Brazilian classical pianist
  - Yaroslav Yevdokimov, 78, Ukrainian-born Belarusian singer
- 24 – Tom Shipley, 84, American folk rock singer-songwriter (Brewer & Shipley)
- 25
  - Igor Kalinauskas, 80, Russian new age singer (Duo Zikr)
  - Nisse Karlén, 50, Swedish melodic black metal singer and bassist (Sacramentum) (death announced on this date)
  - Rogério Meanda, Brazilian rock guitarist (Blitz)
- 26
  - Manuel de la Calva, 88, Spanish pop singer (Dúo Dinámico)
  - Mestre Damasceno, 71, Brazilian carimbó singer
  - Tony Saletan, 94, American folk singer
- 27
  - Jürgen Bartsch, German extreme metal bassist and keyboardist (Bethlehem)
  - Jim Kimball, 59, American punk and post-hardcore drummer (Laughing Hyenas, Mule, The Jesus Lizard)
- 28
  - Ray Mayhew, 59–60, British new wave drummer (Sigue Sigue Sputnik)
  - Gary Didier Perez, 59, Haitian compas singer-songwriter
- 29
  - Ex Tuuttiz, 36–37, Finnish rapper (death announced on this date)
  - Gabriel Feltz, 54, German classical conductor
  - Ema Hurskainen, 53, Finnish humppa drummer (Eläkeläiset)
  - Eric Ozario, 76, Indian Konkani music composer
  - Ahmad Pejman, 90, Iranian-American classical composer
  - Rodion Shchedrin, 92, Russian opera composer and pianist
  - Klaus Thunemann, 88, German classical bassoonist
  - Taimo Toomast, 63, Estonian opera singer
- 30
  - Evgeny Levitan, 81, Russian classical pianist
  - Juhani Markola, 83, Finnish pop singer
- 31 – Diego de Morón, 78, Spanish flamenco guitarist

=== September ===
- 1 – Darmawan Hardjakusumah, 82, Indonesian pop singer (Bimbo)
- 2 – Robert Franz, 57, Canadian classical conductor (Windsor Symphony Orchestra)
- 3 – Ted Robert, 81, Swiss pop singer-songwriter
- 4
  - Yukio Hashi, 82, Japanese enka singer
  - Robby Turner, 63, American pedal steel guitarist
  - Pia Velsi, 101, Italian pop singer
- 5
  - Hooshmand Aghili, 88, Iranian pop and folk singer
  - Bruce Loose, 66, American punk rock singer and bassist (Flipper)
  - Ras Sheehama, 59, Namibian reggae singer
  - Spencer Taylor Jr., 97, American gospel singer (The Highway Q.C.'s)
  - Mark Volman, 78, American rock singer (The Turtles, Flo & Eddie)
- 6
  - Rick Davies, 81, English rock singer-songwriter and keyboardist (Supertramp)
  - Christoph von Dohnányi, 95, German classical conductor
  - Atomic Steif, 57, German thrash metal drummer (Sodom) (death announced on this date)
- 7 – Allen Blickle, 42, American heavy metal drummer (Baroness) (death announced on this date)
- 8 – Angela Ro Ro, 75, Brazilian pop singer-songwriter
- 9
  - Allan Cole, 74, Jamaican songwriter
  - Armando Santiago, 93, Portuguese-born Canadian classical composer and conductor
- 10 – Bobby Hart, 86, American pop singer-songwriter (Boyce and Hart)
- 11
  - Viv Prince, 84, English rock drummer (Pretty Things) (death announced on this date)
  - Nicky Ryan, 79, Irish music producer
- 13
  - Stephen Luscombe, 70, British synth-pop keyboardist and songwriter (Blancmange)
  - Andreas Martin, 72, German schlager singer
  - Farida Parveen, 70, Bangladeshi folk singer
  - Hermeto Pascoal, 89, Brazilian jazz multi-instrumentalist
- 15
  - Joel Moss, 79, American music producer, engineer and mixer
  - Omen, 49, American music producer
- 16
  - Tomas Lindberg, 52, Swedish death metal singer (At the Gates)
  - Michael Sutherland, Australian funk rock drummer (Skunkhour)
- 18
  - Fausto Amodei, 91, Italian folk singer-songwriter and musicologist
  - Brett James, 57, American country singer-songwriter and record producer
  - Diane Martel, 63, American music video director and choreographer
- 19
  - Sonny Curtis, 88, American rock and roll singer-songwriter and guitarist (The Crickets)
  - Chris Doheny, 64, Australian pop rock singer and guitarist (Geisha)
  - Zubeen Garg, 52, Indian folk singer
  - JD Twitch, 57, Scottish club DJ (Optimo)
  - Mike Wofford, 87, American jazz pianist
- 21
  - Ron Carroll, 57, American club DJ
  - Roland Pidoux, 78, French classical cellist (Via Nova Quartet) and conductor
- 23
  - Dieter Kaufmann, 84, Austrian electroacoustic composer
  - Josephine Keegan, 90, Scottish-Irish traditional music pianist, fiddler and composer
  - Danny Thompson, 86, English folk rock bassist (Pentangle, Alexis Korner's Blues Incorporated)
- 25 – Chris Dreja, 79, English rock bass guitarist (The Yardbirds)
- 26
  - Christian, 82, Italian pop singer
  - Jim McNeely, 76, American jazz composer, arranger and pianist
- 27 – Franz Grundheber, 88, German opera singer
- 29 – Vojislav Simić, 101, Serbian jazz composer and conductor
- 30 – Pablo Guerrero, 78, Spanish jazz singer-songwriter

=== October ===
- 1 – Bohdan Bohach, 50, Ukrainian a cappella singer (Pikkardiyska Tertsiya)
- 2 – Chhannulal Mishra, 89, Indian Hindustani classical singer
- 3 – Patricia Routledge, 96, English pop singer
- 4 – Paul Van Bruystegem, 66, Belgian rock bassist (Triggerfinger) (death announced on this date)
- 5 – Véronique Vincent, 68, French experimental rock singer (The Honeymoon Killers, Aksak Maboul)
- 6
  - Theo Jörgensmann, 77, German jazz clarinetist
  - Ray's Kim Edm, 36, Chadian rapper
- 7
  - Halid Bešlić, 72, Bosnian folk singer
  - Ian Freebairn-Smith, 93, American film and television composer
  - Marta Jaciubek-McKeever, 45, Polish-Canadian synthpop and singer (Fan Death, E.S.L.)
  - Speedy Sparks, 76, American country rock bassist (Texas Tornados) (death announced on this date)
- 8
  - Ace Finchum, 62, British metal drummer (Tigertailz, Marseille, Tokyo Blade) (death announced on this date)
  - Rajvir Jawanda, 35, Indian Punjabi singer
  - Terry "Buzzy" Johnson, 86, American R&B singer-songwriter (The Flamingos)
  - Pierre Moutouari, 75, Congolese soukous singer
  - Niyazi Sayın, 98, Turkish classical ney flautist and music educator
- 9 – Fede Dorcaz, 29, Argentine pop singer
- 10
  - Bernhard Klee, 89, German classical conductor
  - John Lodge, 82, English progressive rock bassist and singer-songwriter (The Moody Blues)
  - Thommy Price, 68, American rock drummer (Scandal, Love Crushed Velvet, Joan Jett and the Blackhearts) (death announced on this date)
- 11 – Ian Watkins, 48, Welsh rock singer (Lostprophets)
- 12
  - Jody Henry, American metal bassist (Omen)
  - John Waterhouse, 75, British metal guitarist (Demon)
- 13 – Matt Tolfrey, 44, English electronic DJ, record producer and label owner (death announced on this date)
- 14
  - Richard Addrisi, 84, American pop singer (Addrisi Brothers) and songwriter
  - D'Angelo, 51, American neo-soul singer-songwriter
- 16
  - Chris Di Staulo, 34, Italian-Canadian music video director
  - Klaus Doldinger, 89, German jazz saxophonist and composer
  - Bob Franke, 78, American folk singer-songwriter
  - Ace Frehley, 74, American rock guitarist and singer (Kiss)
  - Jack White, 85, German music producer (body discovered on this date)
- 17
  - Alexandru Cazacu, 75, Moldovan rock guitarist (Noroc)
  - Bernd Meinunger, 81, German lyricist
- 18 – Sam Rivers, 48, American nu metal bassist (Limp Bizkit)
- 19
  - Dave Burgess, 90, American rock and roll singer and saxophonist (The Champs)
  - Anthony Jackson, 73, American jazz bassist
  - Erik Rico, American R&B and house singer-songwriter (death announced on this date)
- 21
  - Zdeněk Bláha, 95, Czech folk bagpiper
  - Davey Langit, 38, Filipino pop singer-songwriter
  - Achille Mouebo, 54, Congolese afrobeat singer-songwriter
  - Dionysis Savvopoulos, 80, Greek pop singer-songwriter
- 22 – David Ball, 66, English synthpop and house keyboardist (Soft Cell, The Grid)
- 23
  - Chris Turner, 74, Australian blues rock guitarist (Buffalo, Rose Tattoo)
  - David Wilde, 90, English classical pianist
- 24
  - Marcie Free, 71, American heavy metal and rock singer (King Kobra, Unruly Child) (death announced on this date)
  - Benita Valente, 91, American opera singer
- 25
  - Gérard Badini, 94, French jazz saxophonist
  - Floria Márquez, 75, Venezuelan bolero singer
  - Peace, American rapper (Freestyle Fellowship) (death announced on this date)
- 26 – Jack DeJohnette, 83, American jazz drummer, pianist and composer
- 27 – Vivian Jones, 68, Jamaican-born British reggae singer
- 28 – Richard Bonnot, 67, French comedy rock singer (Les Charlots)
- 29
  - Andrew Metcalfe, English alternative rock singer (Sound of Guns) (death announced on this date)
  - James Senese, 80, Italian jazz saxophonist (Napoli Centrale)
  - Gladys Stone Wright, 100, American band director
- 30 – Scott Sorry, 47, American rock bassist (The Wildhearts, Sorry and the Sinatras, Amen)
- 31 – Elżbieta Penderecka, 77, Polish music festival organiser.

=== November ===
- 1
  - Ray Drummond, 78, American jazz bassist, composer and bandleader
  - Archie Fisher, 86, Scottish folk singer-songwriter
  - Young Bleed, 51, American rapper
- 2
  - Lô Borges, 73, Brazilian MPB singer-songwriter and guitarist
  - Joseph Byrd, 87, American psychedelic rock multi-instrumentalist (The United States of America), songwriter, and film composer
  - Donna Jean Godchaux, 78, American rock singer (Grateful Dead)
  - Thomas Klein, 59, German speed metal guitarist (Warrant)
  - Jim Self, 82, American tubist and film composer
- 3 – Victor Conte, 75, American jazz bassist (Tower of Power)
- 4 – Robert Taylor, 74, New Zealand rock guitarist (Dragon)
- 5 – Gilson Lavis, 74, English new wave drummer (Squeeze, Jools Holland and his Rhythm & Blues Orchestra)
- 6
  - Chris Bradley, British heavy metal bassist (Savage)
  - Pono, 49, Polish rapper (Zipera)
  - Steve Whitaker, 62, American Christian metal drummer (Barren Cross)
- 10 – Richard Darbyshire, 65, English new wave singer-songwriter and guitarist (Living in a Box)
- 11
  - Guido Di Leone, 61, Italian jazz guitarist
  - Cleto Escobedo III, 59, American jazz saxophonist and bandleader (Cleto and the Cletones)
  - Carmen Moreno, 99, Polish jazz singer
- 12
  - Muazzez Abacı, 78, Turkish classical singer
  - Juraj Lexmann, 84, Slovak musicologist and liturgical composer
  - Bereket Mengisteab, 86–87, Eritrean folk singer-songwriter and krar player
  - Horia Moculescu, 88, Romanian classical pianist and composer.
- 13
  - Fosforito, 93, Spanish flamenco singer
  - Donald McIntyre, 91, New Zealand opera singer
- 14 – Todd Snider, 59, American folk and alternative country singer-songwriter
- 15 – Hilly Michaels, 77, American new wave singer-songwriter and drummer (Sparks)
- 16 – Maxon Margiela, 21, American rapper
- 17
  - Alice and Ellen Kessler, 89, German pop singers
  - Humane Sagar, 34, Indian Ollywood singer
- 19
  - Walt Aldridge, 70, American country singer-songwriter (The Shooters)
  - André Geraissati, 74, Brazilian jazz guitarist and composer
- 20
  - Jean-Claude Éloy, 87, French classical and electroacoustic composer (death announced on this date)
  - Mani, 63, English alternative rock bassist (The Stone Roses, Primal Scream)
- 21
  - Leon Bates, 76, American classical pianist
  - Jean Guidoni, 74, French pop singer-songwriter
  - Jellybean Johnson, 69, American funk drummer (The Time), songwriter, and record producer
  - Seoirse Ó Dochartaigh, 79, Irish folk singer and guitarist
  - Ornella Vanoni, 91, Italian pop singer
- 22
  - Dino Nascimento, Brazilian post-punk bassist (Ira!)
  - Dadou Pasquet, 72, Haitian compas singer-songwriter and guitarist (Magnum Band, Tabou Combo)
  - Lesyk Sam, 58, Ukrainian pop singer (Dzidzio)
- 23
  - Ian Lees, Australian pop rock bassist (Moving Pictures)
  - Phil Upchurch, 84, American jazz and blues guitarist and composer
- 24 - Jimmy Cliff, 81, Jamaican reggae singer-songwriter
- 25 – Biyouna, 73, Algerian pop rock singer
- 26
  - Judy Cheeks, 71, American soul singer
  - Shpat Kasapi, 40, Albanian pop singer-songwriter
- 27
  - Peep Lassmann, 77, Estonian classical pianist
  - Vasco Martins, 68–69, Cape Verdean classical and new age multi-instrumentalist
- 29
  - Leslie Fish, 72, American folk singer-songwriter
  - Poorstacy, 26, American rapper and multi-instrumentalist
  - Alonzo Saclag, 83, Filipino folk singer
  - Bob "Bongo" Starkie, 73, Australian rock guitarist (Skyhooks)
  - Chubby Tavares, 80, American R&B singer (Tavares)
- 30
  - Dag Spantell, 75, Norwegian pop singer
  - Warren Williams, 85, Australian rock musician

=== December ===
- 2 – Billy Nichols, 85, American soul guitarist and songwriter (death announced on this date)
- 3 – Steve Cropper, 84, American R&B guitarist (Booker T. & the M.G.'s), songwriter and record producer
- 4
  - Ted Egan, 93, Australian folk singer
  - Budoy Marabiles, 54, Filipino reggae singer (Junior Kilat)
  - Pops Mohamed, 75, South African jazz multi-instrumentalist
  - Tetsu Yamauchi, 79, Japanese rock bassist (Free, Faces)
- 5
  - Herman Deinum, 79, Dutch blues rock bassist (Cuby + Blizzards)
  - Sandro Giacobbe, 75, Italian pop singer-songwriter
  - Camryn Magness, 26, American pop singer
- 6
  - Rafael Ithier, 99, Puerto Rican salsa pianist and bandleader (El Gran Combo de Puerto Rico).
  - Jerry Kasenetz, 82, American music producer and songwriter
  - Rory MacLeod, 70, American blues and swing bassist (Roomful of Blues)
- 7
  - Anita Guerreiro, 89, Portuguese fado singer
  - Peter McFarlane, 73, Australian hard rock drummer (Finch, Swanee)
- 8
  - Gordon Goodwin, 70, American jazz pianist and saxophonist (Big Phat Band)
  - Raul Malo, 60, American country rock singer-songwriter and guitarist (The Mavericks)
  - Yaya Moektio, 68, Indonesian hard rock drummer (God Bless)
  - Jubilant Sykes, 71, American opera and multi-genre singer
- 9
  - Roberto Iniesta, 63, Spanish hard rock singer and guitarist (Extremoduro)
  - Phil Vinall, English record producer and engineer (death announced on this date)
- 11 – Brent McLachlan, New Zealand shoegaze drummer (Bailter Space) (death announced on this date)
- 12
  - Manny Guerra, 85, American tejano singer-songwriter and record producer
  - Marilyn Mazur, 70, American-born Danish jazz percussionist
  - Magda Umer, 76, Polish pop singer-songwriter
- 13
  - Anda-Louise Bogza, 60, Romanian opera singer
  - Abraham Quintanilla, 86, American tejano singer-songwriter and record producer
- 14 – Carl Carlton, 72, American R&B, funk and soul singer-songwriter
- 15
  - Joe Ely, 78, American alternative country singer-songwriter (The Flatlanders)
  - Thomas Johannes Mayer, 56, German opera singer
  - Anna Rusticano, 71, Italian pop rock singer
- 16 – DJ Warras, 40, South African radio and club DJ
- 17 – Max Eider, British indie pop singer-songwriter and guitarist (The Jazz Butcher) (death announced on this date)
- 20
  - Lindomar Castilho, 85, Brazilian bolero singer
  - Ken Downie, British IDM DJ (The Black Dog).
  - Michał Urbaniak, 82, Polish jazz multi-instrumentalist
- 19 – Mick Abrahams, 82, English blues rock guitarist (Jethro Tull, Blodwyn Pig)
- 21 – Jontho, 48, Norwegian black metal singer (Ragnarok)
- 22 – Chris Rea, 74, English blues rock singer-songwriter and guitarist
- 23 – Paa Kow, Ghanaian highlife drummer
- 24
  - Perry Bamonte, 65, English alternative rock multi-instrumentalist (The Cure, Love Amongst Ruin).
  - Howie Klein, 77, American record label executive
- 25 – Stu Phillips, 92, Canadian-American country singer
- 26
  - Don Bryant, 83, American R&B singer-songwriter
  - Pate Mustajärvi, 69, Finnish rock singer (Popeda)
- 27
  - Fanny, 46, French pop singer
  - Gary Graffman, 97, American classical pianist
  - Ants Soots, 69, Estonian classical conductor
  - Latha Walpola, 91, Sri Lankan pop singer
- 28 – Andy Billups, 72, British blues rock bassist (The Hamsters)
- 30 – Richard Smallwood, 77, American gospel singer-songwriter
