= 2025 in African music =

The following is a list of events and releases that happened in 2025 in African music.

== Events ==
- February 2 – At the 67th Annual Grammy Awards, the award for Best African Music Performance goes to Tems for "Love Me JeJe".
- April 27 – The Headies 2024
- July 10 – Burna Boy's new album, No Sign of Weakness, released today, features Travis Scott, Mick Jagger, Stromae, and Shaboozey.
- September 7 – As part of the BBC Proms season, Angélique Kidjo stars in "African Symphony", a concert held in Bradford, UK.
- September 8 – Tyla wins the Best Afrobeats category at the 2025 MTV Video Music Awards.
- November – 31st Annual South African Music Awards

== Albums released ==
- Amaarae – Black Star
- Black Sherif – Iron Boy
- BNXN – Captain
- Burna Boy – No Sign of Weakness
- Davido – 5ive
- Gyakie – After Midnight
- Qing Madi – I Am The Blueprint
- Moonchild Sanelly – Full Moon

== Deaths ==
- January 9 (date death announced) – Doc Shebeleza, 51, South African kwaito musician
- January 14 – Teddy Osei, 87, Ghanaian saxophone player, drummer and vocalist (Osibisa)
- March 13 – Yallunder, 30, South African afro-soul singer-songwriter
- April 4 – Amadou Bagayoko, 70, Malian musician (Amadou & Mariam)
- May 16 – Dada KD (Nana Kwakye Duah), 56, Ghanaian highlife musician
- May 25 – Foday Musa Suso, 75, Gambian musician and composer
- June 6 – "Gentleman" Mike Ejeagha, 95, Nigerian folklorist, highlife musician and songwriter
- June 13 – Louis Moholo, 85, South African jazz drummer (The Blue Notes, Brotherhood of Breath, Assagai)
- July 26 – Daddy Lumba, 60, Ghanaian highlife singer-songwriter
- August 13 – Rachid Ferhani, 80, Algerian Kabyle singer
- August 24 – Khaled Louma, 70, Algerian musician and radio presenter
- September 5 – Ras Sheehama, 59, Namibian reggae musician (suicide)
- October 6 – Ray's Kim Edm, 36, Chadian rapper
- October 8 – Pierre Moutouari, 75, Congolese singer
- October 21 – Achille Mouebo, 54, Congolese singer-songwriter
- November 3 (date death announced) – Akiin Shuga, 50, Nigerian singer
- November 12 – Bereket Mengisteab, 86/7, Eritrean singer, songwriter and composer
- November 25 – Biyouna, 73, Algerian singer and actress
- December 4 – Pops Mohamed, 75, South African multi-instrumentalist, jazz musician and producer

== See also ==
- 2025 in music
