= All the Best (EMI compilation album series) =

All The Best series

Compilation album by Various EMI artists
- Released: 2012
- Length: 2CD
- Label: EMI Music Germany

All the Best is a 2012 compilation album series of 2CD albums by EMI Records Germany featuring EMI and Virgin artists. Many of the artists had already been covered in a 1CD EMI compilation series as Essential in 2011. Others, particularly for the German artists, were new compilations, and listed on artist websites.

The compilations' choice of music reflected what had been popular in Germany, causing Allmusic's reviewer to criticize the All the Best - UB40 issue in the series with the conclusion "All the Best really means All the Non-Political Best".

== Issues ==
- All the Best Edith Piaf
- All the Best Hot Chocolate
- All the Best The Shadows
- All the Best Suzi Quatro
- All the Best The Stranglers
- All the Best The Human League
- All the Best Culture Club
- All the Best Jethro Tull
- All the Best Dr. Hook
- All the Best Runrig
- All the Best Shirley Bassey
- All the Best UB40
- All the Best The Hollies
- All the Best Gary Moore
- All the Best Sinéad O'Connor
- All the Best Crowded House
- All the Best The Dubliners
- All the Best Eddie Cochrane
- All the Best Ten Years After
- All the Best Gerry and the Pacemakers
- All the Best The Ramones

Continental Europe artists

- All the Best Andreas Martin
- All the Best Bernhard Brink
- All the Best Tom Astor
- All the Best Michelle
- All the Best Claudia Jung
- All the Best Maria & Margot Hellwig
- All the Best Fernando Express
- All the Best Adamo
- All the Best Howard Carpendale
- All the Best Nicki
- All the Best Christian Anders
- All the Best Matthias Reim
- All the Best Captain Cook und seine singenden Saxophone
