= Faku =

Faku may refer to:

- Faku County, in Liaoning, China
- Amanda Faku (born 1993), South African singer, performer and songwriter
- Faku kaNgqungqushe (1780's–1867), monarch of the Mpondo kingdom in Southern Africa
- Feya Faku (1962–2025), South African trumpeter and flugelhornist

== See also ==
- Fakku, an English-language hentai publisher
