= Katrakis =

Katrakis (Greek: Κατράκης) may refer to one of the following:

- Manos Katrakis (1908–1984), Greek actor of theater and film
- Christina Katrakis (born 1980), American and European artist, art historian, modern art critic
- Vaso Katraki (1914–1988), Greek painter and printmaker
