= T34 =

T34 may refer to:

== Vehicles ==
- T-34, a Soviet tank circa 1940
- T34 Calliope, a World War II American tank-mounted rocket launcher
- T34 Heavy Tank, an American tank
- Beechcraft T-34 Mentor, an American trainer aircraft
- Slingsby T.34 Sky, a British glider
- German torpedo boat T34, a German warship of World War II

== Other uses ==
- T34 (classification), a disability classification used in para-athletics
- T-34 (film), a 2019 Russian war film about the T-34 tank
- T34 (microprocessor), a microprocessor compatible with the Zilog Z80
- Deto Station, Osaka, Japan
- Pratt & Whitney T34, a turboprop aero engine
- T34, a rock band founded by Khaled Louma
- T-34, a rock band featuring Al Murray
