= Dadou Pasquet =

Haitian singer-songwriter and guitarist (1953–2025)

- Born: André Pasquet; 19 August 1953; Port-au-Prince, Haiti
- Died: 22 November 2025 (aged 72)
- Occupations: Singer-songwriter; guitarist

André "Dadou" Pasquet (19 August 1953 – 22 November 2025) was a Haitian singer-songwriter and guitarist.

Pasquet was best known for his performances with Magnum Band and Tabou Combo, thanks to inspiration from his uncle, Dòdòf Legros. He was considered an innovator of Haitian soul music.

Pasquet died on 22 November 2025, at the age of 72.
