= Igor Kalinauskas =

Russian painter (1945–2025)

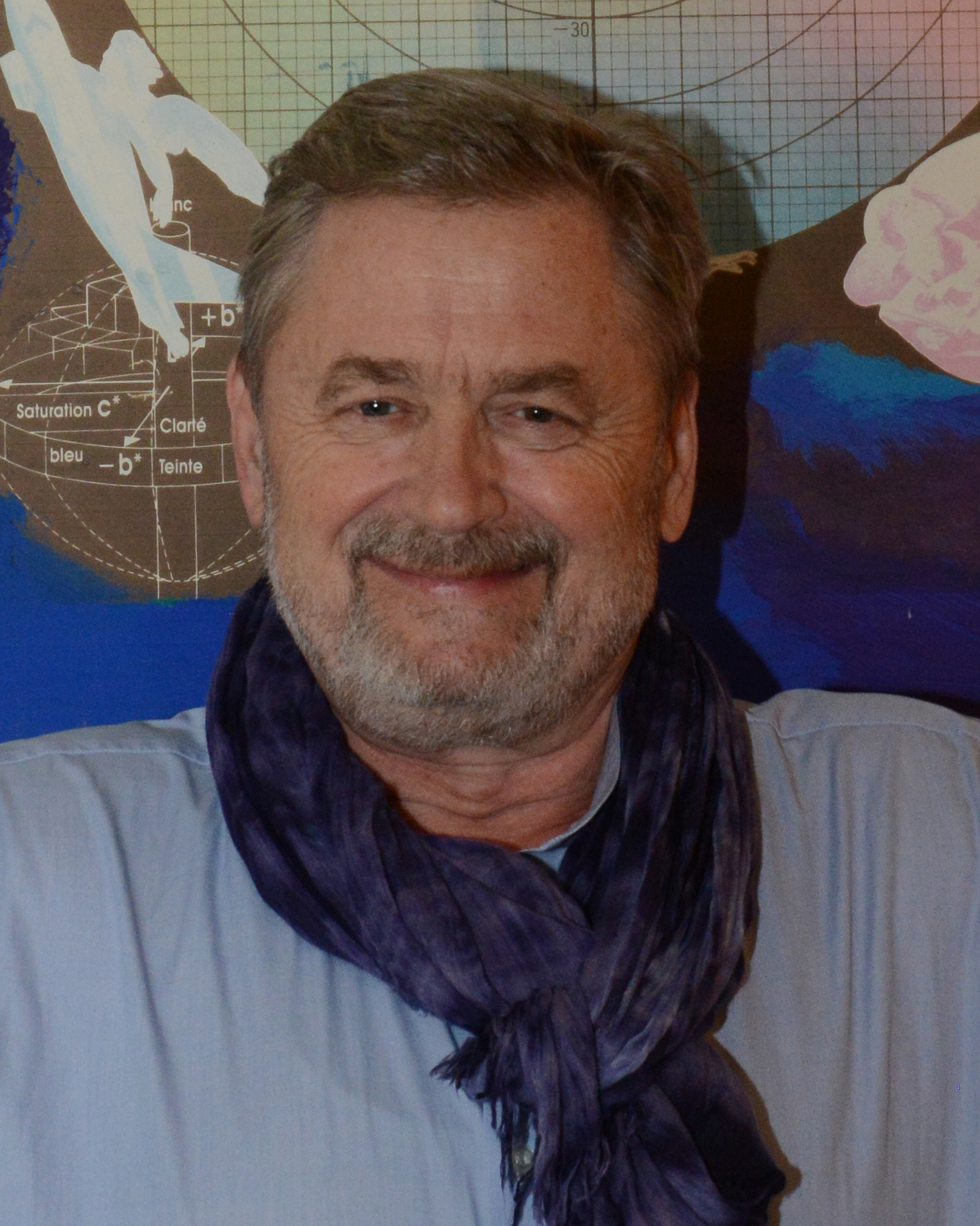
- Kalinauskas in 2014
- Born: Igor Nikolayevich Nikolayev; 7 February 1945; Novgorod, Russian SFSR, USSR
- Died: 25 August 2025 (aged 80)
- Education: Boris Shchukin Theatre Institute
- Known for: Painting, music
- Notable work: The series Wandering Stars (2005); The Impression of the "Last Supper": Spirit, Flesh, Blood (2005)
- Movement: Visionary art, Tondo
- Website: uigoria.ru/en/

Igor Kalinauskas (Russian: Калинаускас Игорь Николаевич, Lithuanian: Igoris Kalinauskas, born Igor Nikolayevich Nikolayev; 7 February 1945 – 25 August 2025) was a Russian artist, theater director, singer and a member of the vocal Duo Zikr.

== Early life and education ==
Kalinauskas was born on 7 February 1945 in Novgorod, Russian SFSR, USSR.

From childhood, he was interested in visual art, painted watercolors and one of his works was exhibited at the city art exhibition. He became an artist in 1996. In 1970, he graduated from the Boris Shchukin Theatre Institute in Moscow and became a theater director.

== Theater director ==
Between 1970 and 1984 Kalinauskas staged 68 productions at many drama theatres in the former USSR. He worked as a stage director in Astrakhan, Ordjonikidze, Minsk, Vilnius and other towns. The most significant plays directed by Kalinauskas in the Russian Drama Theatre of Lithuania were I. Fridberg's Arena, Yurodiya based on the Dostoyevskynovel Crime and Punishment, Alexander Ostrovsky’s Enough Stupidity in Every Wise Man and Grigori Gorin's Phenomena.

== Psychologist ==
Kalinauskas became interested in psychology and spirituality. "I dealt with psychology and philosophy of the subject. There wasn't more prohibited topic in the Soviet Union both in art and science," said Kalinauskas. His theater activities were banned.

From 1985, Kalinauskas worked as psychologist at the Institute of Physical Culture. His system of training was used by the highest ranked sportsmen, including the high jump world champion, Rudolf Povarnitsyn. From 1986, he worked as a psychologist at Kiev Institute of Medical Radiology with the people who had been dealing with the consequences of the Chernobyl Nuclear Power Plant explosion.

In the post-Soviet era, he became the author of some popular psychology books including Alone with the World (eight editions published between 1991 and 2009, in Russian, Slovak, Czech, Lithuanian, English), Art of living (1994, in Russian, Slovak, Czech, Lithuanian, English), Spiritual fellowship (1996, in Russian, Slovak, Lithuanian) and Sitting well (1997).

== Singer ==
In 1993, Kalinauskas and Olga Tkachenko created the vocal Duo Zikr. "The duo use the ancient techniques of throat vibration and circular breathing to achieve their deeply soulful improvisations, often with a choir." They have traveled all over the world and recorded 20 albums. A video clip of Duo Zikr, The Road to Katmandu, directed by Fyodor Bondarchuk, won the main prize for the best direction in the 6th Moscow Festival of Music Clips "Generation–98". As a musician and a singer, Kalinauskas is known by the stage name Silin, his mother's maiden name.

== Artist ==
In 1996, Kalinauskas rediscovered an interest in painting again. His first work was a three-meter wide picture, The Bawl (1997). He had several workshops in Moscow, Kyiv, Bratislava and on a farm (Paakmenio) near Tauragnai in south-eastern Lithuania. His works have appeared in more than 25 exhibitions in galleries in Ukraine, Russia, United States, Lithuania, Slovakia and other countries, and are in private collections in many countries. As an artist, he is known under the pseudonym INK.

The art critic Konstantin Doroshenko defines Kalinauskas' genre as Visionary art.

The art historian and cultural philosopher Algis Uždavinys observed, "Some pictures of I. Kalinauskas are full of childish naiveté close to the so-called Western Primitivism painting of the XX century. But at the same time the artist is searching for a deeper philosophical meaning… his pictures can be regarded as the special means for meditation, or incitements to search for the secret doctrine concealed behind the primitive surface."

His works can be divided into three groups, portraits, landscapes and abstract paintings. He created more than 400 portraits, among them The Master Admiring the Cup (1998), Portrait of Arkadij (1999), portrait of a woman The Enlighted (2000), self-portrait Light Shaped Me out of Darkness (2000) and Barbara’s portrait (2010). "Kalinauskas describes man not just as Aristotle’s "political animals"... but as a creature rising far above the horizontal stratum of existence, a medium, a contemplator."

His landscape works are a kind of bridge between his portraits and abstract works. Harmony and the quest for it is the tenor of such works. They include The Turčianske Valley (2000), Eastern morning (2001), and Lone traveller (2002). Nevertheless, "if most landscapes by the artist denote the insight into potentiality of another world with greater harmony, then his series of abstractions indicates an attempt to discover some "clips" of existence... They indicate the regular quest for the artistic and ontological "initial elements" able to recover man fallen out of the initial overwhelming unity of the world".

=== The Wandering Stars series ===
The Wandering Stars series was created in 2005 and exhibited in different countries. Stars in his pictures resembled people: a man, like a star, generates the whole world.

"'Star differs from star in glory,' the Apostle said. But for the epithet "wandering" and the colour diversity of the canvases, we might say that these are "portraits" of angel stars shown through the same symbols of the colour and whirlpool. But actually these are portraits of humans, to be more precise – the portraits of their souls, wombs and hearts," says Alisa Lozhkina, editor-in-chief of Art Ukraine.

Of The City - New York, four large paintings from the series The Wondering Stars, the artist and art historian Christina Katrakis, MFA, says, "One may argue, that the height of the contemporary "tondo movement" took place in early sixties and seventies, with works by such artists as Wojciech Fangor and his non-tantric disc-like paintings. This theme was later continued in a series of works by Lea Lenhart. While some artists such as Robert Schaberl, Hans Herbert Hartwieg, also Gary Lang and Tracy Melton still continue to work in the Tondo movement today. Yet I do not see Igor Kalinauskas' work as the remains of the 60s and 70s movement... On contrary, I see it as a totally new wave of Tondo, which underwent the renaissance of its own principal ideals and is now a thriving, totally new, post-modern form of expression".

Nicholas Bergman, the co-director at Caelum Gallery in New York, says, "The artist’s motif is the circle, and he delves not only into its geometric properties but also its symbolic impact. The circles can be warm and inviting, as they conjure female qualities like the womb and the breast, or they can be awesome as they evoke eclipses of the moon or the sun and other cosmic events. The viewer is presented with fascinating ambiguities such as the element of scale. Circles might allude to the microscopic world or to the macrocosmic, and they might occupy positive or negative space. The works are rich in colour and vibrant with brushwork."

=== The Last Supper: Spirit, Flesh, Blood ===
Redefining of the famous The Last Supper by Leonardo da Vinci is a distinctive theme of Kalinauskas' art on which he has worked for many years. The first exhibition devoted to the masterpiece was presented in 2006 at the Leonardo da Vinci National Science & Technology Museum in Milan. Other exhibitions of his impression from the da Vinci masterpiece included "INK The Last Supper: Spirit, Flesh, Blood" (Bratislava, Slovakia, 2011).

The most complete realization of his vision of a famous painting was presented Lavra gallery in Kyiv (Ukraine) in a philosophical large-scale art project "2000 years have passed. Faces faded, but the light remained" (polyptych-installation, reminiscence). In this installation, the series of canvases represents the faces of the apostles and Christ at The Last Supper. The canvases are only a part of this installation. There were a pictorial polyptych altar and pillars in the shape of angels that protected the improvised nave. There was a big white table to "bring closer" the biblical scene. In addition, in the background could be heard the music of Zikr. "In the beginning of last century Wagner started to elaborate the theory of the unity of arts. And from that time on, many artists have tried to accomplish perfection, universal art that could combine all the arts... Today I was present at this amazing synthetic act, where Igor Kalinauskas, as a stage director, a musician and an artist, united all types of art: music, painting, directing, sculpture, performance and a book", said Alla Revenko, the art historian and professor at Kyiv State Art Institute, author Synthesis of the arts.

=== Ultra Violet Light ===
"Ultra Violet Light" is a joint art project of Kalinauskas and a French-American artist, Isabelle Collin Dufresne (Ultra Violet), the muse of Salvador Dalí and Andy Warhol, the star of Pablo Picasso’s play. The project includes "the series of works related to the aspect of light itself, such as Kalinauskas’ burning spheres of light in "wondering stars" and "cosmic embryos", and Ultra Violet's neon light works and "9/11 sculptures". At the core of this creative collaboration is the concept not only of the "light" as the vital element, but the vision of light, as it is perceived by a woman artist versus a man artist. Two visions form the ideal yin and yang duo".

"Ultraviolet Light" was presented in February 2014 at the Depardieu Gallery in Nice, and in September 2014 in the RAR Gallery in Berlin (curator Christina Katrakis, United States).

=== List of personal exhibitions ===
- 1998, June – Saint Petersburg, Russia. Free Russian Contemporary Art Fund.
- 1998, August – Kaunas, Lithuania. House of Perkunas.
- 2003, January – Vilnius, Lithuania. Stiklo karoliukai Gallery. Mystery of Loneliness.
- 2004, December – Saint Petersburg, Russia. The Joseph Brodsky Museum. Mystery of Time (The Magician's Office).
- 2006, March – Milan, Italy. Leonardo da Vinci National Science & Technology Museum. The Last Supper: Spirit, Flesh, Blood.
- 2006, June – Paris, France. Chapelle Saint-Louis de la Salpêtrière. The exhibition "Genese: Paroles de la Creation".
- 2008, September – Vilnius, Lithuania. Gallery "Actus magnus". The exhibition "Abstract erotica. Series "Breast".
- 2010, August – Zurich, Switzerland. The exhibition "Wandering Stars".
- 2011, May – Moscow, Russia. Elena Vrublenskaya gallery. The exhibition "Magician Chamber".
- 2012 January – London, UK. "Rebirth: dreams and Memories" installation, for Bond magazine, Saatchi Gallery.
- 2012 June–July – Kyiv, Ukraine. "Eternal Light" the exhibit of "The Last Supper" installation. Lavra Gallery.
- 2013 September–October – Lviv, Ukraine. Gary Bowman Gallery, British Club, "The Sacred - Wandering Stars II".
- 2014 September – Berlin, Germany. RAR Gallery. Part of Art Berlin Art Fair Project "The Last Supper" installation.
- 2014 September – Berlin, Germany. RAR Gallery. Part of Art Berlin Art Fair Project "Ultraviolet Light".
- 2014 January – New York City, United States. Caelum Galley, Chelea. "The City - New York".
- 2014 February – Nice, France. Depardieu Gallery. "Ultraviolet Light" - art in making - live art & film project.

== Death ==
Kalinauskas died on 25 August 2025, at the age of 80.
