= Independence Monument (Ukraine) =

Victory column in Kyiv, Ukraine

- Монумент Незалежності
- Independence Monument in Maidan Nezalezhnosti
- Interactive map of Independence Monument
- Location: Kyiv, Ukraine
- Coordinates: 50°26′58.3″N 30°31′31.4″E
- Height: 61 m (200 ft)

The Independence Monument (Ukrainian: Монумент Незалежності, romanized: Monument Nezalezhnosti) is a victory column located on Maidan Nezalezhnosti (Independence Square) in Kyiv, commemorating the independence of Ukraine in 1991.

Stylistically, it presents a mix of Ukrainian Baroque and Empire style. The monument was built in the center of the square for the 10th anniversary of the independence in 2001. The monument itself is a column with a figurine of a woman (Berehynia) with guelder-rose branch in her hand. The height of the monument is 61 m (200 ft). The column is faced with white Italian marble that stands on a pedestal in the form of a Christian temple.

== History ==
A monument to Vladimir Lenin formerly stood in the current position of the Independence Monument, which was dismantled in September 1991 after the Declaration of Independence of Ukraine on 24 August 1991.

The reconstruction of Maidan Nezalezhnosti (Independence Square) began only in 2000, and a competition was held from 7–21 September 2001 to design a new monument. The organizers decided on three finalists and merged their proposals into a single structure, with Anatoliy Kushch commissioned as the sculptor, and his daughter Christina Katrakis served as model for the Statue of Berehynia. The Independence Monument was inaugurated on 23 August 2001 by President Leonid Kuchma to commemorate the 10th anniversary of Ukrainian independence.

In December 2014, the chief architect of Kyiv, Serhiy Tselovalnyk, proposed replacing the monument with a new one commemorating the Heavenly Hundred protestors killed during the Revolution of Dignity.

The monument was cleaned on 23 May 2019, which required the use of special equipment and cranes.

During the Russian invasion of Ukraine, the monument was included in a list of heritage sites to be fortified against shelling and bombing. It was removed from the list owing to cost concerns and its height making it difficult to defend.

== Design ==
The Independence Monument consists of a triumphal column and statue at its apex. The total height of the monument is stated to be 61 or 62 metres. A spiral staircase is contained within the column.

== See also ==
- Berlin Victory Column
- Angel of Independence (Mexico)
- Monument to Magdeburg Rights (Kyiv)
