= The Highway Q.C.'s =

American gospel group

The Highway Q.C.'s is an American gospel group that has been active for over 70 years. Its members sing in the tradition of jubilee quartets, though they have also added instrumental accompaniment. The group helped launch the careers of several secular stars, including Lou Rawls, Johnnie Taylor and Sam Cooke.

The Highway Q.C.'s were founded in 1945 in Chicago by a group of male teenagers who attended Highway Baptist Church, including Sam Cooke, Creadell Copeland, Marvin Jones, Charles Jones, Jake Richard, and Lee Richard. Cooke sang with the group through 1951, when he joined The Soul Stirrers; and Lou Rawls participated through 1953. Prior to joining the HQCs, Rawls sang with the Holy Wonders, and eventually, all of the other Wonders (Spencer Taylor, James Walker, and Chris Flowers) also joined the HQCs.

After Rawls's departure in 1953, Johnnie Taylor joined the group, and in 1955 they made their first recordings for Vee-Jay Records. In 1957 Taylor left the group, replacing Cooke in the Soul Stirrers when Cooke pursued a solo career. Spencer Taylor, who joined the group in 1956, became the HQC's leader and has remained so for over 60 years. They have recorded for Savoy Records, A&M Records, and other labels.

Spencer Taylor Jr. died on September 5, 2025, at the age of 97.

== Sources ==
- Jason Ankeny, The Highway Q.C.'s at Allmusic
