= J Nyi Nyi =

Burmese pop singer and musician (1953–2025)

J Nyi Nyi ဂျေညီညီ
- Born: 12 December 1953; Wakema Township, Burma (now Myanmar)
- Died: 31 March 2025 (aged 71) Yangon, Myanmar
- Genres: Pop, traditional Burmese, contemporary
- Occupation(s): Singer, songwriter, musician, composer
- Instrument(s): Vocals, guitar, keyboard, ukulele
- Years active: 1970s–2025
- Spouse: Daw Sandy

J Nyi Nyi (Burmese: ဂျေညီညီ; pronounced [dʑè ɲì ɲì]; 12 December 1953 – 31 March 2025) was a Burmese singer, composer and musician renowned for his significant contributions to Myanmar's pop music scene. Active from the 1970s until his death in 2025, he played a pivotal role in shaping contemporary Burmese pop music by blending traditional sounds with modern influences. He was known as a member of the J Family in the Burmese music industry. Over his decades-long career, he released multiple acclaimed albums and remained a prominent figure in Myanmar's music industry.

== Early life and education ==
J Nyi Nyi was born on 12 December 1953 in Wakema Township, Ayeyarwady Region, Burma (now Myanmar). He developed a passion for music early in life and pursued formal education in the arts and music, which honed his skills as a vocalist and songwriter.

== Career ==
J Nyi Nyi began his musical journey in the 1970s, quickly establishing himself as a leading figure in Myanmar's pop music scene. His distinctive vocal style and versatility garnered widespread acclaim. In the 1980s, he was instrumental in modernizing Burmese pop music by integrating traditional Burmese sounds with contemporary pop elements, appealing to a broad audience.

Born in Wakema Township, Ayeyarwady Region, J Nyi Nyi was the second of three siblings. He developed a passion for music from a young age and entered the music industry in his twenties. He gained widespread recognition with his debut album, Thuy Ngai, released in 1984. He was only a year younger than his older brother, J Maung Maung, who was also active in the music industry. Throughout his career, he composed and performed songs for projects such as Alum Cafe, Platform Show, and Thuy Ngai, which became well known among audiences.

On 15 May 2012, J Nyi Nyi was involved in a car accident near the RIT campus in Insein Township, Yangon, which led to an eight-year hiatus from the music industry. After recovering from his injuries, he resumed his career, performing on stage, recording music, and participating in street music festivals.

== Personal life and death ==
J Nyi Nyi married Daw Sandy in 1999, and they had one son, Bono. He was part of a musically prominent family; his older brother, Jay Maung Maung, and younger sister, Jay Nyimalay, were both singers, while his niece, Thiri Jay Maung Maung, also gained recognition in the music industry. He resided in Yangon, Myanmar, until his death.

J Nyi Nyi died in Yangon, Myanmar on 31 March 2025, at the age of 71.

== Discography ==
=== Total albums released ===
1. J Nyi Nyi Yin Htel Mar (2023)
2. Chit Tal (2023)
3. A Lwan Ka Phee (2023)
4. A Kaung Sone Tay Myar (2023)

=== Studio albums ===
1. Mat Thine Myar (1992)
2. A Yate Ka Lay (2002)
3. Swel Nay Pe (2023)
4. Lu Phyo Gyi Pal Lote Tote Mal (2023)
5. Chit Mie Nay Pe (2023)
6. De Moe (2023)
7. Platform Show (2023)
8. A Chit Moe (2023)
9. Swe (2023)
10. Koe Kan Pae Shi Par Say (2023)
11. Eain Mat Htel Ka Kyun Taw (2023)

=== Singles ===
1. Lu Bawa (2024)
