= Magnum Band =

Kompa band formed in 1976

- Origin: Little Haiti, Miami
- Genre: kompa
- Years active: 1976–present
- Members: Dadou Pasquet, Nestor Azerot, André Déjean, Camille Armand, Laurent Cicero, David Lacombe, Claude Pasquet, Lucien Benjamin, Kangri Mann (Oscar Dudamel)
- Past members: See Past members below

Magnum Band is a kompa band formed on June 24, 1976 by André Pasquet (a.k.a. Dadou), former musician of the group Tabou Combo, and his brother Claude Pasquet (a.k.a. Tico) in Miami.

In the late 70s the group became known in various clubs of Queens and Brooklyn thanks to the substantial Haitian community there. In 1980 they made their first international tour. In 1996, they performed at the 1996 Summer Olympics opening ceremony in Atlanta. In 1997, the band represented Haiti in the first World Creole Music Festival in Dominica. Throughout their tours in Guadeloupe in 2003 in France, Canada and the United States, the Magnum Band participated in the promotion of Haitian compas, and strengthened its footprint. The group celebrated its thirtieth anniversary in June 2006. The Haitian compas style interpreted by Magnum Band can be categorised as "old school".

In June 2014 the band received the Honneur et Merite price from the Radio Television Caraibe.

André and Claude Pasquet are the uncles of American francophone singer Teri Moïse.

== Members ==
=== Past members ===
- Jean Almatas
- Roland Cameau
- Nasser Chery
- Essud Fungcap
- Jean Robert Narcisse
- Yvon Mondésir
- Varnel Pierre
- Waag Lalanne
- Ernst Gabriel
- Alexander "Russ" Harden
- Ray Tindell
- Tom Mitchell
- Tim Newman
- Bob Curtis
- Gaeton Villeaux
- Lucas Canton

Jean Laurent Ciceron - Bass

== Discography ==
- 1979. album : Expérience
- 1980, album : Jehovah
- 1981, album : Piké devan
- 1983, album : La Seule Difference
- 1985, album : Ashadei
- 1990, album : Adoration
- 1993, albums : Tèt ensem, Difé
- 1994, albums : The best in town, Pure gold, Paka pala
- 1995, album : Best of Magnum Band
- 1996, album : San fwontiè
- 1997, albums : Anthologie volumes 1,2 and 3
- 1999, album : Live
- 2000, album : The Anthologies
- 2001, album : 25ème anniversaire
- 2004, album : Oulala!
