= Seoirse Ó Dochartaigh =

Irish musician (1946–2025)

Seoirse Ó Dochartaigh (pronounced [ˈʃoːɾˠʃə]; 17 June 1946 – 21 November 2025) was an Irish singer, guitarist, composer, record producer, painter, writer and publisher.

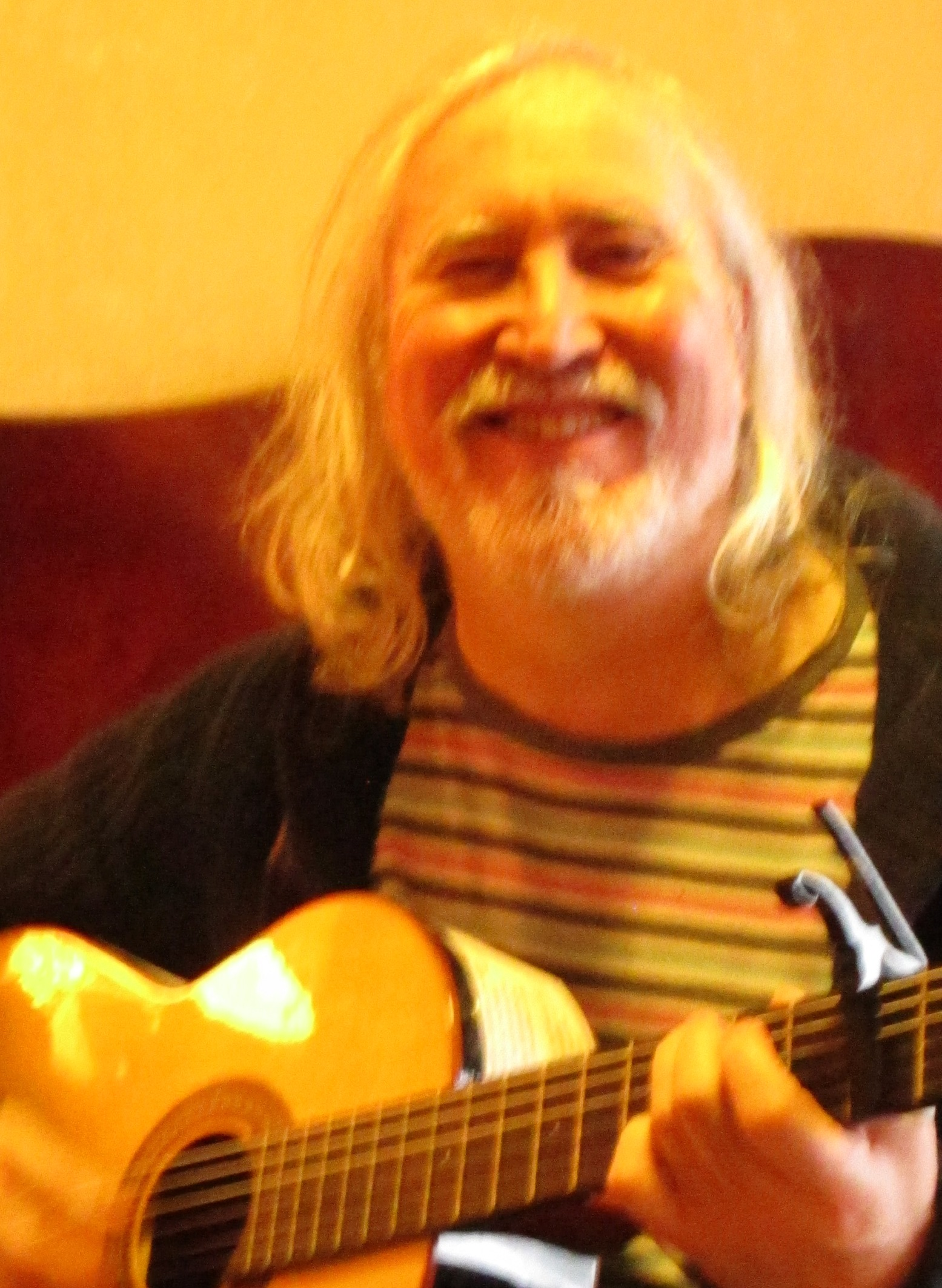
Ó Dochartaigh in 2013

== Background ==
Born in Belfast, Ó Dochartaigh's family's background was on the Inishowen peninsula in County Donegal where the family returned to in 1947. Story-telling, folklore, and history was transmitted through his father George O'Doherty (the name is an anglicization of his own), while music, and particularly singing, was passed on by his mother, Bridget (née Toner) who hailed from County Armagh. He studied fine arts (painting) at the Ulster College of Art, Belfast (now the Belfast School of Art at Ulster University), 1966–1970, followed by postgraduate studies in education at Cardiff University, 1970–1971. In music, he did not pursue formal studies and was self-taught on the guitar. He was resident in County Donegal since 1977. He learned the Irish language in many summer courses at Coláiste Bhríde at Rann na Feirste in the Donegal Gaeltacht where he also taught singing. In 1978, he was accepted for an M.A. degree in music at University College Cork under an independent research clause, but at the time he could not afford the required fee. He later used the content of his thesis in lectures.

Ó Dochartaigh taught art full-time in a number of places including Crossmaglen, County Armagh (1971–1975); St Louise's Comprehensive College, Belfast (1975–1977); and Scoil na Mainistreach (Abbey Vocational School), Donegal town (1977–2001). He then took early retirement to devote more time to his research interests and artistic activities.

Ó Dochartaigh died on 21 November 2025, at the age of 79, after some years of illness.

== Music ==
As a musician, he founded the band Dúlamán (1996–1998) and performed as a solo artist under the stage name Seoirse with his own compositions, written in an Irish traditional style and his own arrangements of traditional, popular, and selected classical music. Recordings of his music have been published since 1988.

The first of Ó Dochartaigh's studio recordings, Slán agus Beannacht (1988) received moderate airplay in Ireland, Germany, and the United States, with encouraging reviews. About the album Bláth Buí (1992) a critic remarked that his voice had "the uncanny ability to tap the essence of a traditional song while investing it with new spirit and, at times, a good bit of fun." But it was not until his third album, Oíche go Maidin (1993), that critics recognized the individuality of his craft. Nuala O'Connor in The Irish Times, described them as "a confident, imaginative reworking of traditional songs, some well-known, others local to Ó Dochartaigh's home in the Donegal Gaeltacht. [...] His feel for the mood of the song is sure, and his arrangements and setting flow organically out of this." On this album Ó Dochartaigh interpolated the music of Schubert, Mozart, and Vivaldi into his musical arrangements, the effect having been described as "stark, yet startlingly beautiful in places. This is Seoirse's most compelling work so far." Regarding the album Tabhair ar ais an Oíche Aréir (2000), partly recorded with Dúlamán, the critic Aidan O'Hara described Ó Dochartaigh's arrangements as "varied and innovative" and the album as "a gem of a CD and a pleasure to listen to".

Dúlamán performed music in "their own special style of songs in Irish in the 'old style' as well as the 'new style' with vocal harmonies and accompaniment on bodhrán, pipes, whistle, guitar, African and Asian percussion all woven together in a delicate tapestry of sound". The band's last public concert was on 8 December 1998 at the O'Reilly Hall, University College Dublin. Band members included Steáfán Hannigan (percussion, whistles, uilleann pipes), Aodh Mac Ruairí (voice, guitar, whistles), Heather Innes (voice), Tony Hunter (percussion), Seán McKay (keyboards).

== Art ==
As a painter, Ó Dochartaigh had established himself, since 1993, as an artist whose vision was firmly rooted in the microcosm of the landscape of County Donegal in the north-west of Ireland. He was attracted by the local landscape and its flora: his paintings are replete with heather, fern, gorse, blackthorn blossom, bog cotton, in a multi-coloured abstracted form.

His first major solo exhibition was called "Oíche go Maidin" ("Dusk till Dawn") and took place in the Duke Gallery, Dublin, in September and October 1993. The 24 paintings exhibited on this occasion took their inspiration from traditional songs from the Donegal region which had "provided him with a wealth of naturalistic imagery". Another major exhibition was at the Schubertkirche Vienna in 1996. Subsequently, this led to an online exhibition on the Franz Schubert related motif of "Die schöne Müllerin", in which Ó Dochartaigh is represented. An appraisal of his artwork, published in 2000, assessed his paintings in the context of other Irish artist like Louis le Brocquy, Brian Bourke, and Seán McSweeney. The 2008 Maynooth Year Book devotes the book-cover and an entire chapter to his paintings, with seven reproductions and a lengthy appraisal. A 2008 exhibition at Fort Dunree, County Donegal, was his artistic response to the Ten New Songs album by Leonard Cohen, expressing his belief "that feelings can be transcribed into colours to reveal the human condition".

== Writing ==
In later years, Ó Dochartaigh was also active as a writer on clan history and local history, as well as authoring a substantial volume on recordings of Irish classical music that was envisaged as a listener's guide.

Books on clan history include his own family (The Seven Races of Inishowen O'Doherty, 2008), two volumes of The Great Marriage Book of Inishowen (2021, 2022), and Gleann Daoile (2023). Related themes are the history of local names and of place names, with several books of this kind published since 2014.

His book Sunlight and Shadow. A Listener's Guide to Irish Classical Music (2016) revealed Ó Dochartaigh’s decades-long interest in Irish art music of the past and present, which he collected in various formats including LPs, MCs, and CDs, in addition to numerous recordings on reel tapes that he made from radio broadcasts. The book contains listings and descriptions of commercial recordings since the 1950s. Apart from depictions of the recordings' covers, the book is illustrated throughout with his own paintings, the "wealth of illustrations and fascinating information making for absorbing reading, viewing and listening".

== Discography ==
All on Errigal Records (SM numbers = LPs, SC numbers = MC; SCD numbers = CDs).

- Slán agus Beannacht (SM001, 1988; SCD003, 1990)
- Bláth Buí (SCD004, 1992)
- Oíche go Maidin (SCD005, 1994)
- Tabhair ar ais an OícheAréir – Bring Me Back Last Night (SCD007, 2000), with Dúlamán
- Dúlamán a’ tSléibhe (SCD008, 2002), with Dúlamán
- Seoirse – Celebrating 20 Years (SCD009, 2006)
- Seoirse and Peadar – Live in the Cellar Club (SCD010, 2014; originally on MC, 1987)
- Péire Stróicthe! (SCD011, 2014; originally on MC, 1989)
- Amhráin agus Bodhráin (SCD012, 1994)
- Da capo – Sampler (SCD013, 2009)
- Mná na hÉireann (SCD014, 2009)
- Sheep May Safely Graze (classical guitar) (SCD018, 2009)
- Windmills of the Mind (SCD021, 2013)
- Crimson Moon – Gealach Dhearg (SCD025, 2018)
- A Chraoibhín Aoibhinn Álainn Ó (SCD026, 2019)
- Ciorcal Rónáin (SCD028.01, 2024)
- The Heart's a Wonder, Vol. 1 (SCD028, 2024)

== Books ==
All books published under his own imprint except otherwise noted.

- Seacht Sliocht Uí Dhochartaigh Inis Eoghain – The Seven Races of Inishowen O'Doherty (2008); ISBN 978-0-9559550-0-6
- Oíche go Maidin – Dusk till Dawn. A Seoirse Ó Dochartaigh Postcard Book (2012); ISBN 978-0-9559550-3-7
- Inis Eoghain: The Island of Eoghan – The Place-Names of Inishowen (2014, repr. 2017); ISBN 978-0-9559550-1-3
- The Great Name Book of Inishowen. Surnames and First Names (2016), ISBN 978-0-9559550-9-9
- Sunlight and Shadow. A Listener's Guide to Irish Classical Music (2016, repr. 2019); ISBN 978-0-9559550-7-5
- The Miller's Odyssey. Old Buncrana from West End to Mill End (2016, repr. 2020); ISBN 978-0-9559550-8-2
- The Great Marriage Book of Inishowen, vol. 1: 1875–1970 (2021)
- Know Your Place. An Exploration of the Place Names of Ireland (Dublin: Red Stripe Press, 2021); ISBN 978-1-78605-140-0
- The Great Marriage Book of Inishowen, vol. 2: 1871–1901 (2022)
- Gleann Daoile. The Families of Gleneely and Culdaff from Early Times to 1901 (2023); ISBN 978-0-9559550-9-9
- Redmond Friel (1907–1979). The Composer Revisited (2024); ISBN 978-1-80517-306-9
