= Fernando Express =

Fernando Express are a German schlager group founded in 1969 as Skippies.

== Discography ==
=== Albums ===
- 10/1985 Montego Bay
- 03/1987 Wir machen Holiday
- 09/1989 Dolce Vita
- 10/1990 Sehnsucht nach Sonne
- 10/1991 Unter den Sternen des Südens
- 11/1992 Das Märchen der weißen Lagune
- 03/1994 Alle Sehnsucht dieser Welt
- 03/1995 Ihre größten Erfolge
- 06/1996 Sei du meine Insel
- 03/1998 Die Könige der Tanzpaläste
- 09/1999 Wenn Egon tanzt
- 09/2000 Sonnentaucher
- 02/2002 Südlich der Sehnsucht
- 04/2004 Unser Traum darf nicht sterben
- 06/2005 Urlaub für die Seele
- 03/2007 Tanz auf dem Vulkan
- 09/2008 Meer der Zärtlichkeit
- 10/2010 Die Könige der Tanzpaläste
- 01/2012 Pretty Flamingo
- 08/2013 Bella Bellissima
- 06/2014 Sommer in der Seele
- 01/2017 Das Beste
- 09/2017 Träume sind für alle da
- 06/2018 Insel des Glücks
- 09/2018 Einmal Himmel und zurück
- 11/2019 Das schönste Geschenk

=== Singles ===
- 05/1984 Sommer, Sonne, Liebe
- 05/1985 Montego Bay
- 10/1985 Goodbye Love
- ##/1986 Keiner da (Herzliche Grüße von Ibiza)
- 03/1987 Wir machen Holiday
- 10/1987 Voyage - Voyage
- 04/1988 Aloa
- 09/1988 Dolce Vita
- 05/1989 Fly Away Flamingo
- 09/1989 Holiday Lover
- 01/1990 Fiesta Americana
- 06/1990 Weiße Taube Sehnsucht
- 11/1990 Die versunkene Stadt
- 04/1991 Sehnsucht nach Samoa
- 09/1991 Flüsterndes Herz
- 12/1991 Farewell Kontiki
- 04/1992 Goodbye Bora Bora
- 08/1992 Das Märchen der weißen Lagune
- 01/1993 Canzone di Luna D #73
- 07/1993 Jambo Jambo
- 01/1994 Piano, Piano
- 03/1994 Capitano D #96
- 06/1994 Copacabana
- 07/1994 Alle Sehnsucht dieser Welt
- 03/1995 Mit dem Albatros nach Süden
- 09/1995 Du bist der Wind in meinen Segeln
- 05/1996 Der Tag, an dem die Sonne wiederkam
- 10/1996 Sei du meine Insel
- 03/1997 Eviva La Samba (promo single only)
- 07/1997 Silbervogel (promo single only)
- 02/1998 Serenata d'Amore (promo single only)
- 06/1998 Feuer und Flamme (promo single only)
- 11/1998 Solang' mein Herz noch schlägt (promo single only)
- 04/1999 Party-Hit-Mix (promo single only)
- 08/1999 Wenn Egon tanzt (promo single only)
- 01/2000 Frei wie der Wind (promo single only)
- 06/2000 Casanova
- 11/2000 Barcarole Romantica (promo single only)
- 05/2001 Die Insel der verlorenen Träume
- 10/2001 Über alle 7 Meere
- 02/2002 Santo Domingo, die Sterne und du
- 06/2002 Südlich der Sehnsucht
- 04/2003 Bolero d'Amore (promo single only)
- 09/2003 Die Insel der verlorenen Träume (promo single only)
- 02/2004 Die 10 Gebote der Liebe (promo single only)
- 06/2004 Die Sonne von Capri (promo single only)
- 09/2004 Unser Traum darf nicht sterben (promo single only)
- 02/2005 Coconut und Calypso (promo single only)
- 06/2005 Barfuß bis ans Ende der Welt (promo single only)
- 11/2005 Träumer können fliegen (promo single only)
- 03/2006 Liebe gibt und Liebe nimmt (promo single only)
- 07/2006 Vino in Portofino (promo single only)
- 01/2007 Tanz auf dem Vulkan (promo single only)
- 05/2007 Fliegen bis zum Regenbogen (promo single only)
- 09/2007 Tausend und ein Gefühl (promo single only)
- 03/2008 Du bist mein tägliches Wunder (promo single only)
- 08/2008 Der Rote Mond von Agadir (promo single only)
- 11/2008 Das Märchen von Arcadia (promo single only)
- 07/2009 Piroschka
- 10/2010 Fremde Augen – Fremde Sterne
- 01/2011 Ich geh durch die Hölle
- 09/2011 Pretty Flamingo
