= Ted Robert =

Swiss singer-songwriter (1943–2025)

- Born: Robert Gurtner; 11 October 1943; Canton of Bern, Switzerland
- Died: 3 September 2025 (aged 81); Orbe, Switzerland
- Occupation: Singer-songwriter

Robert Gurtner (11 October 1943 – 3 September 2025), better known by the stage name Ted Robert, was a Swiss singer-songwriter.

Often seen singing and songwriting alongside the likes of Michel Drucker and Alain Morisod, he was also active in politics, unsuccessfully pursuing candidacy for the Council of State of Vaud and the National Council as a member of the Swiss Democrats.

Robert died on 3 September 2025, at the age of 81.

== Discography ==
- Adieu la mer (1976)
- La vie au soleil (1978)

== Filmography ==
- Garde mon souvenir (1981)
- American Sosie (1986)
- Ted Robert, le rêve américain (1996)
