= Rustem Suleymanov =

Russian conductor (1977–2025)

- Рустэм Сулейманов (Russian); Рөстәм Сөләймәнов (Bashkir)
- Born: 5 October 1977; Sterlitamak, Bashkir ASSR, RSFSR, USSR
- Died: 19 July 2025 (aged 47); Yalta, Crimea, Ukraine
- Occupations: Violinist; conductor

Rustem Salikhovich Suleymanov (Russian: Рустэм Салихович Сулейманов, Bashkir: Рөстәм Сәлих улы Сөләймәнов, Röstäm Sälix ulı Söläymänov; 5 October 1977 – 19 July 2025) was a Russian violinist and conductor who was the artistic director and chief conductor of the National Symphony Orchestra of the Republic of Bashkortostan (2011–2014). He was also the winner of the Shaikhzada Babich Award (State Republican Youth Prize).

Suleymanov died in Crimea on 19 July 2025, at the age of 47.
