= Peep Lassmann =

Estonian pianist (1948–2025)

Peep Lassmann (19 March 1948 – 27 November 2025) was an Estonian pianist who was trained at the Moscow Conservatory under Emil Gilels. He served as the rector of the Estonian Academy of Music and Theatre from 1992.

== Life and career ==
Lassmann was born in Tartu on 19 March 1948. He performed the Estonian premieres of Olivier Messiaen's Vingt regards sur l'enfant-Jésus and Catalogue d'oiseaux.

He joined the Tallinn Conservatoire in 1973 and remained associated with it, holding positions such as lecturer, professor, head of the piano department, and vice-rector. From 1992 to 2017, he served as the rector of the Estonian Academy of Music and Theatre and became a member of its board in 2020.

Lassmann died on 27 November 2025, at the age of 77.
