= Duo Zikr =

- Origin: Kyiv, Ukraine; Moscow, Russia
- Genres: free voice, throat singing, ambient, new age, world
- Years active: from 1993
- Label: Free
- Members: Igor Silin/Kalinauskas; Olga Tkachenko
- Website: ,

Duo Zikr is a vocal duo formed by Igor Silin and Olga Tkachenko. The duo performs a queer style of ritual, shamanic, scat vocalese that embraces traditions and techniques borrowed from Asiatic singing and Muslim and Buddhist chants to create a range of sound and tones almost equal to that of a symphony orchestra. Vocal compositions of the duo consist of loud and quiet sounds accompanied by a piano: church chants meet spirituals, combined with throat singing and avant-garde music.

== Origins ==
The duo's name, "Zikr", derives from an Arabian word for "prayer" – a spiritual practice aimed at revelation of an internal sense of divine presence. The art of Igor and Olga unites profound philosophy and unique combinations of vocal techniques with chamber and folk vocals, Tibetan mantra vocal techniques, Tuvan guttural singing, Sufi zikr, Orthodox rites and more. The vocal range of the duet is composed of 4 octaves.

Duo Zikr was created in the early 1990s. The opening performance of the magic theatre took place in 1993 in St. Petersburg at Smolny Cathedral.

One rare event when the soloists of the Magic Theatre of Voice sang concrete words instead of spontaneous syllables and sounds was the soundtrack to The Song of the Cheese Spirit, an animated cartoon by famous fable of Aesop "The Fox and the Crow".

The duo has performed concerts in the US, France, Italy, England, Finland, Slovakia, Israel, Australia and other places around the globe.

Jim Bessman, special correspondent for Billboard magazine (NY, US) – "Apart from dynamic improvisations making the visitors experience unique feelings, there is one more thing about the duo. That is an astonishing attraction of the passion in the very voices and the manner of the performing".

In 2007 Igor and Olga launched an experimental project that later on had grown to a full-scale music band called FireVoices. The sextet of male singers has been learning Duo Zikr's unique vocal technique ("freevoice") and individually as well as jointly with the duet they have staged over 50 concerts in France, Czech Republic, Lithuania, Cyprus, Russia and Ukraine.

== Biography ==
=== Olga Tkachenko ===
Olga completed the course at Kyiv-based Institute of Dramatic Art named after Karpenko-Kary.

=== Igor Silin ===
Igor Kalinauskas (Silin is his stage-name) graduated with honors from the drama school named after Schukin, Directing faculty, in Moscow.

== 1000 Friends of Duo Zikr club ==
The crowdfunding club was established in late 2016 as an attempt to help Duo Zikr's concert managers throughout Europe to pool funds together and ensure as many events as possible.

== Discography ==
- The Magic of Love (2018)
- The Power (2018)
- A Few Words About the Soul (2017)
- The Spirit Warrior: Vocal Symphony (2016)
- Pulsar (2015)
- Sky's Jump (2014)
- Ocean (2013)
- 2000 Years Passed: Faces Faded, Light Remained (2012)
- Magic River (2012)
- Angels in the City (2008)
- Breath of Space (2008)
- Voice Message (2008)
- Premonitions of a Shooting Star (2007)
- Sound of Magic (2007)
- Happy Happy Crazy (2005)
- Soul in the Arms of God (2005)
- Spring Journey (2005)
- Place of Power (2004)
- Mystery of the Fire (2003)
- In Search of Light (A Journey to Love) (2001)
- In Search of Light (Our Century) (2001)
- Journey into Love (2001)
- Free Flight (2000)
- Duo Zikr (1998)
- To the Beginning of Times (1998)
- To the Twilight of Times (1998)
- Journey of Souls (1998)
- Creation of the World (1996)
- Time That Dances (1996)
- Vertical Section (1996)
- Wormwood Star (1996)
- Element of Fire/Impossible Eros (1994)
- Mystery of the Cup (1994)
- Voices: Introduction to Practical Magic for the Art Lover (1994)

== Awards and festivals ==
Duo Zikr has taken part in various international music festivals

- SyncSummit 2014, Paris, France
- MIDEM 2013, Cannes, France
- MIDEM 2011, Cannes, France
- MIDEM 2010, Canes, France
- BID, Berlin, Germany
- Christmas meetings in the Northern Palmira, St. Petersburg, Russia
- MANIFECTI, Turku, Finland;
- MEDIAWAVE, Djer, Hungary;
- ITF, Monastery, Tunisia;
- Golden Autumn, Slavutych, Ukraine;
- SXSW, Ostin, Texas, USA
