= Andreas Martin (singer) =

German schlager singer (1952–2025)

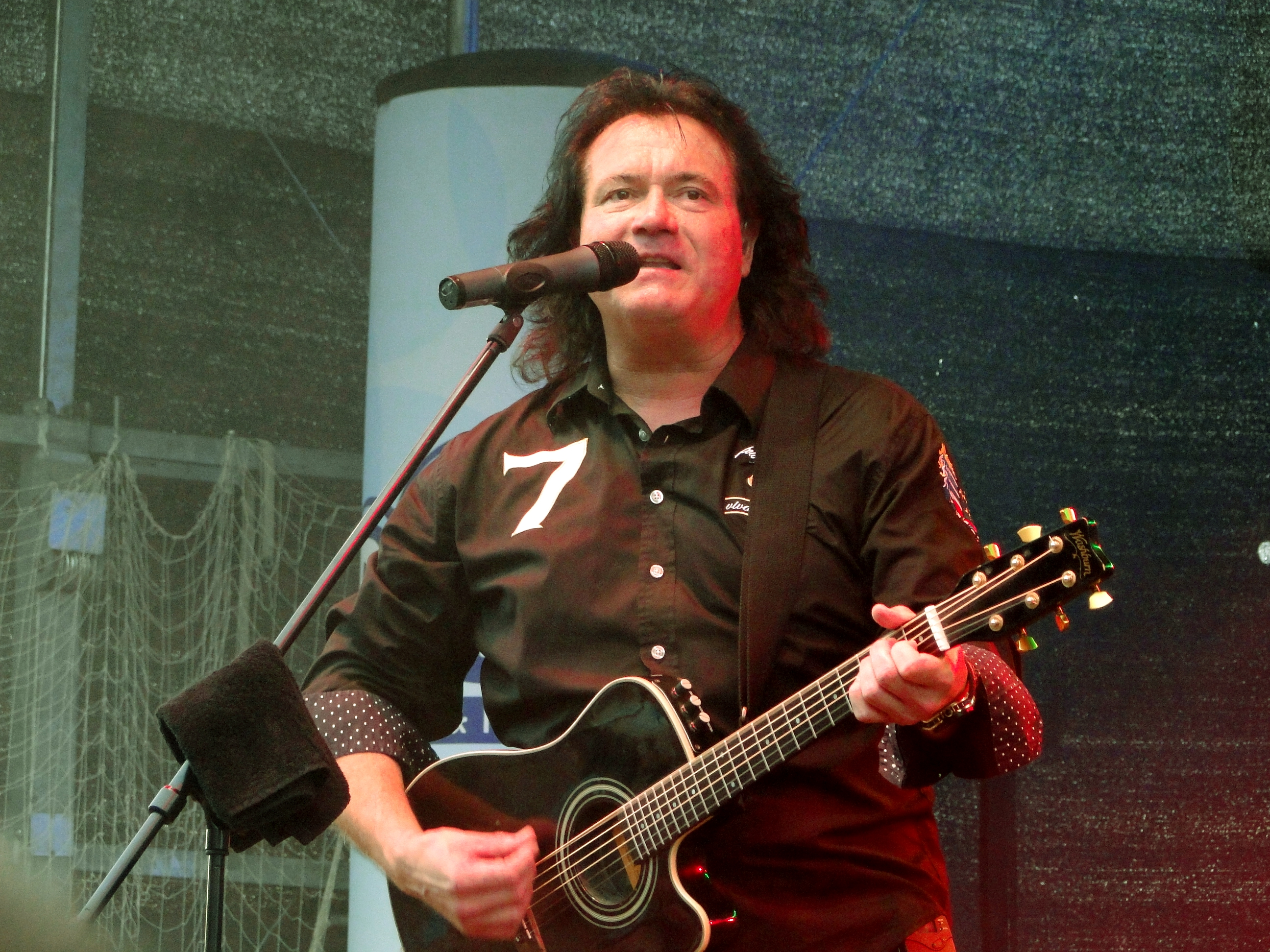
- Martin in 2011

Background information
- Born: 23 December 1952; East Berlin, East Germany
- Died: 13 September 2025 (aged 72)
- Genres: Schlager
- Occupations: Singer
- Website: andreasmartin.de

Andreas Martin (23 December 1952 – 13 September 2025) was a German schlager singer. He came third in the OGAE Second Chance Contest 1989. Martin died on 13 September 2025, at the age of 72.

== Discography ==
- 1982: Andreas Martin
- 1984: Was man Liebe nennt
- 1987: Du bist alles
- 1988: Nur bei dir
- 1990: Ein Teil von mir
- 1991: Side by Side (with Drafi Deutscher as New Mixed Emotions)
- 1992: Verbotene Träume
- 1994: Herz oder gar nichts
- 1995: Alles Gute, in Liebe
- 1997: Mit dir und für immer
- 1998: Allein wegen dir
- 2001: C'est la vie
- 2002: Das Beste
- 2003: Niemals zu alt
- 2005: Wir leben nur einmal
- 2006: Gib niemals deine Träume auf
- 2007: 100 Prozent Sehnsucht
- 2008: Mondsüchtig
- 2009: Aufgemischt
- 2010: Lichtstrahl
- 2012: Kein Problem
- 2012: All the Best
- 2014: Für dich
- 2016: Tänzer, Träumer, Spinner
