= Dada KD =

Ghanaian highlife musician (1968/1969–2025)

Emmanuel Harrison Brefo (1968/1969 - 16 May 2025), also known as Dada Kweku Duah or Dada KD, was a Ghanaian highlife musician.

== Early life and education ==
Duah was born and bred in Kwadaso in the Ashanti Region of Ghana to Brefo Takyiakwa, a driver and Madam Abena Asubonteng, a chopbar operator at Ashanti Town, a suburb of Kumasi. He completed secondary school in 1992.

== Career ==
Duah began his career at the age of seven and became an instrumentalist and played in the church. His professional music career commenced in the early 1990s with singles such as "Odo Mu Anigye" and "Adi Nye Wop." His music, often centered around themes of love and societal issues. One of his most notable songs, "Fatia Fata Nkrumah," is a tribute to Ghana's first President, Kwame Nkrumah, and his Egyptian wife, Fathia Nkrumah.

In 2024, during an interview on Asaase Radio's Breakfast Show, he advised the youth in Accra to have a source of income before getting into marriage.

== Personal life ==
Duah had five children. He was the third of five children. He was a Presbyterian.

=== Death ===
Duah died at the Gbawe SDA Hospital in Accra, on 16 May 2025. He was 56.

=== Discography ===
==== Albums ====
- Honey Love
- Adi Nye Wop
- Eden na megyee
- Somugye
- Ebeboawo
- Obiara Se Eye
- Ode twe boom/ny goes boom boom
- Mewura/Odo Mu Anigyebi

==== Singles ====
- "Tekyere Ma"
- "Ene Menye"
- "Wosuro a Wondi"
- "Fatia Fata Nkrumah"
- "Odo Mu Anigye"
- "Yebeye Yen Ho Fi"

== Awards ==
Duah won the Best Male Vocal Artist award at the 2004 Ghana Music Awards UK.
