= Akinloye Tofowomo =

Nigerian singer and songwriter (1975–2025)

Akinloye Tofowomo (6 January 1975 – 30 October 2025), popularly known as Akiin Shuga, was a Nigerian singer, songwriter and businessman. He is best known as the founder and lead singer of the popular Nigerian live band Shuga band, that was formed in 1998. Tofowomo was also the founder of Shuga Limb Foundation, a foundation that cares for people suffering from polio.

== Life and career ==
Tofowomo was born in Ondo state to the late Justice Tofowomo, of the Federal High Court. He spent his formative years in the eastern part of the country; Enugu and Calabar. His desire to run a well-structured music business led him to study music business at Berklee College of Music. At age five, he suffered from polio but was able to pull through, with the support and encouragement of his father.

Akiin Shuga started the Shuga band in 1998 at Pintos, an upscale bar at Allen Avenue in Ikeja owned by late Segun Onobolu. He started the band as a three-piece band and the band has grown to be a fourteen-piece live band. On Friday 19 January 2018, Akin was unveiled as the Rotary International District 9110 Polio Ambassador, the event in which he dedicated his “I can Walk” song to polio survivors in Africa.

Some of his credited songs include I Can Walk, My Lady, and You Are Married Today. He also won several awards and received honours, including the CityPeople Lifetime Achievement Awards 2017, and the Shuga Band Best Band of the Year 2016, 2017 Beatz Awards.

Tofowomo was married to Maria Tofowomo, and had children. He died in New Brunswick, Canada on 30 October 2025, at the age of 50.
