= Wily Mignon =

Beninese singer and composer (1986–2025)

- Born: Mignon E. Wilfried; 29 April 1986; Parakou, Benin
- Died: 4 February 2025 (aged 38); Ouagadougou, Burkina Faso
- Occupations: Singer, composer

Mignon E. Wilfried (29 April 1986 – 4 February 2025), better known by the stage name Wily Mignon, was a Beninese singer, composer, and arranger.

== Life and career ==
Born in Parakou on 29 April 1986, Mignon began his musical work with his sisters in Ouidah, where he was a school orchestra conductor. While living in Porto-Novo, he was a bassist and launched an album in June 2007. He then entered into a relationship with the singer Dossi, but the couple separated in 2021.

== Death ==
Wily Mignon died in Ouagadougou on 4 February 2025, at the age of 38.

== Discography ==
- Mindédji
- Lintchin
- Mimanonwlao
