= Heorhiy Gina =

Ukrainian musician (1932–2025)

Heorhiy Mykolayovych Gina (Ukrainian: Георгій Миколайович Ґіна; 16 April 1932 – 19 May 2025) better known as Yuriy Gina, was a Ukrainian violinist, composer, conductor, folklorist and teacher.

== Life and career ==
Gina began his career in 1947 as a violinist and accordionist at the Chernivchanka restaurant in Chernivtsi.

He graduated from the Chernivtsi Music College and the Ukrainian National Tchaikovsky Academy of Music in 1956. He then became a music teacher, and director of Chernivtsi Children's Music School No. 1. In 1975, he became artistic director and conductor of the chamber orchestra of the Chernivtsi Regional Philharmonic.

Gina died on 19 May 2025, at the age of 93.

== Awards ==
- Honored Artist of the Ukrainian SSR (1980)
- Laureate of the Regional Literary and Artistic Prize. S.V. Orobkevych (2000)
- Alley of Stars in Chernivtsi (2000)
- People's Artist of Ukraine (2002)
