= Mario Trabucco =

Italian violinist (1951–2025)

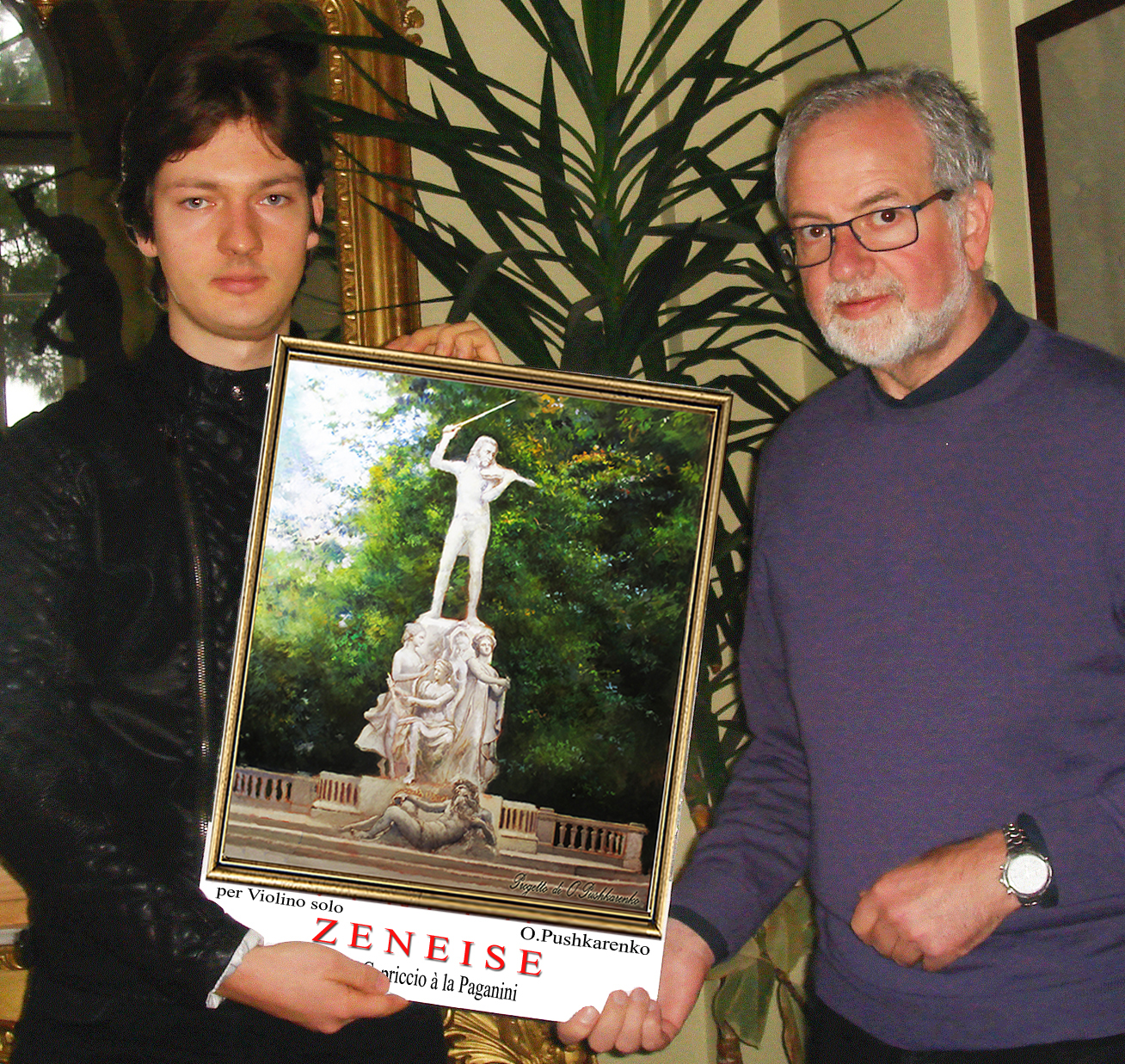
Trabucco and his student Oleksandr Pushkarenko with the project of a monument to Niccolò Paganini

Mario Trabucco (14 September 1951 – 4 March 2025) was an Italian violinist.

== Life and career ==
From 1972 onwards, Trabucco was the curator-violinist of the historical violin the "Cannone" made by Guarneri del Gesù, which had once belonged to Niccolò Paganini, and its copy the "Sivori" by Jean-Baptiste Vuillaume. With the "Cannone" he performed abroad: Hanoi, Santiago de Compostela, Tokyo, St. Petersburg and the European Parliament in Strasbourg.

Trabucco graduated from the Conservatory Niccolò Paganini in Genoa with Mario Ruminelli. He received the Diploma of Merit from the Chigiana Music Academy in the high-specialization violin course held by Salvatore Accardo and Riccardo Brengola (Siena, 1970).

He performed concerts as a soloist in, among other places, Rome, Florence and Genoa.

Trabucco was concertmaster of the Opera Theatre of Rome, the Comunal Theatre of Florence, the Carlo Felice Theatre of Genoa, the Orchestra of Italian Switzerland and the Orchestra of St. Cecilia in Rome.

Until 2015 Trabucco was professor of violin at the Conservatory Niccolò Paganini of Genoa.

Trabucco died on 4 March 2025, at the age of 73.

== Prizes and awards ==
Trabucco won the violin competition "Vittorio Veneto" in 1970, Italy.
