= Fede Dorcaz =

Argentine singer (1996–2025)

- Born: Federico Dorcazberro; 28 January 1996; Mar del Plata, Argentina
- Died: 9 October 2025 (aged 29); Mexico City, Mexico
- Cause of death: Murder by shooting
- Occupations: Model; singer

Fede Dorcaz (28 January 1996 – 9 October 2025) was an Argentine model and singer. He first worked as a model in Spain and later became a singer in Argentina, with songs like Cara Bonita and Volver A Empezar. Dorcaz was also a contestant on Las Estrellas Bailan En Hoy, a Mexican television talent show.

== Murder ==
Just days before he was set to appear on a popular Mexican television dance competition, Fede was shot in the neck in Mexico City on October 9, 2025 after leaving a dance rehearsal and was reportedly on his way home when the incident occurred. He was pronounced dead at the scene. The perpetrators fled the scene on motorcycles.

== Filmography ==
- Venga la Alegría- Guest (2024)
- Premios lo nuestro - Guest (2024)
- Premios Juventud - Guest (2025)

== Discography ==
Studio albums

- Instinto (2024)
