= Karel Bláha (singer) =

Czech singer (1947–2025)

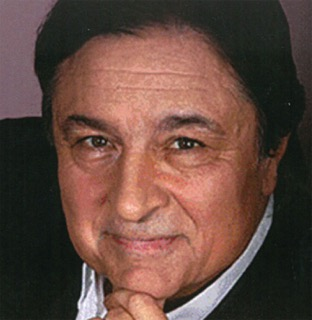
- Born: 20 September 1947; Prague, Czechoslovakia
- Died: 2 May 2025 (aged 77); Prague, Czech Republic
- Occupation: Opera singer
- Years active: 1960s–2010s

Karel Bláha (20 September 1947 – 2 May 2025) was a Czech operetta and musical singer and actor. His vocal field was a lyric tenor.

== Early life and career ==
After graduating from the Ostrava and Prague conservatories, despite the ban on active artistic activity of conservatory students, Bláha performed as a singer with the Zdeněk Barták Orchestra during his studies. He began his professional career after winning a singing talent competition in 1967 with a short engagement at the Rokoko Theatre. For the next three decades, Bláha worked as a leading soloist of the Karlín Musical Theatre. His roles included the most famous characters from operettas and musicals: the title role of Jim in Rose Marie, the main character in the operetta Paganini, the main character Su Chong in The Land of Smiles, the main character Bolo in Polish Blood, Eisenstein in Die Fledermaus, Tony in West Side Story, among other characters in the musicals My Fair Lady, Oklahoma!, Rock Musical, Orpheus and Eurydice.

Bláha completed his education at the Accademia Nazionale di Santa Cecilia in Italy. He also toured Austria, Belgium, the Netherlands, Japan, Germany, Israel, the USA, Canada, the United Kingdom, Switzerland and Spain. During his career, he collaborated with top conductors, including Karel Vlach, Milivoj Uzelac, and Gustav Brom.

In the 1960s and 1970s, Bláha made a name for himself with several recordings in the field of popular music (I Buy You a Ribbon, Mozart's Spinet, I Want the Sun, The End of Dancing, Halali, I Like That Corner, I'll Send You a Few Greetings). He also participated in music festivals such as Bratislavská lýra, Děčínská kotva.

== Death ==
On 2 May 2025, Bláha died at a retirement home in Prague 4 after prolonged health complications. He was 77.
