= Nicole David =

Saint Lucian musician (1974–2025)

- Born: 2 March 1974
- Origin: Saint Lucia
- Died: 2 June 2025 (aged 51)
- Genres: Soca
- Occupation: Singer

Nicole David (2 March 1974 – 2 June 2025) was a Saint Lucian soca musician. She was referred to as "St. Lucia's Queen of Soca" and was a member of the soca band DN5. She later became the lead vocalist of the band Spectacle.

== Carnival competition record ==
David won the roadmarch during St Lucia Carnival 2005 with her song "Bounce". She placed third on two occasions in the St Lucia Soca Monarch competition (2004 and 2005), but decided not to participate in the competition in 2006. She represented St. Lucia in the Queen of Soca Competition in Trinidad and placed 7th.

== Style ==
Her performance style was often compared to that of Barbadian soca artiste Alison Hinds.

== Digicel ==
David had a sponsorship contract with Digicel, which included a video for her hit "Bounce".

== Death ==
David died after a battle with cancer on 2 June 2025, at the age of 51.

== Notable songs ==
- "Jammette" (St. Lucia Soca 2007)
- "Wukking up is we Culture" (St. Lucia Soca 1999)
- "Mischievous" (St. Lucia Soca 2006)
- "What a Feeling" (St. Lucia Soca 2006)
- "Road Block" (St. Lucia Soca 2007)
- "Bounce" (St. Lucian Road March 2005)
- "Mate'" (St. Lucia Soca 2004)
- "Jabal"
