= Captain Cook und seine singenden Saxophone =

German schlager instrumental group (founded 1993)

- Origin: Germany, 1993
- Genres: German pop
- Years active: 2000s–2020s
- Labels: EMI; Koch Universal; Ariola; Delta Music

Captain Cook und seine singenden Saxophone (lit. 'Captain Cook and His Singing Saxophones') is a German schlager instrumental group founded in 1993. The band covers German pop songs and German language versions of English hits, such as "Rote Lippen Soll Man Küssen", originally by Cliff Richard.

== Andrea & Manuela ==
They have provided music as Andrea & Manuela, a duet.

== Discography ==
- Captain Cook und seine singenden Saxophone (Electrola [EMI], November 1993)
- Traummelodien Folge 02 (Electrola [EMI], February 1995)
- Wenn die Sehnsucht nicht wär' (Koch Universal, 1999)
- Der weiße Mond von Maratonga (Koch Universal, May 2003)
- Bist du einsam heut Nacht (Koch Universal, September 2004)
- Ich denk' so gern an Billy Vaughn (Koch Universal, February 2005)
- Du bist mein erster Gedanke (Koch Universal, May 2005)
- Tanze mit mir in den Morgen (Koch Universal, August 2006)
- White Christmas (Koch Universal, November 2006)
- Mandolinen und Mondschein (Koch Universal, June 2007)
- Du bist nicht allein (Koch Universal, May 2008)
- Da tanzten wir zu Billy Vaughn (Koch Universal, October 2008)
- Steig in das Traumboot der Liebe (Koch Universal, November 2008)[DVD]
- Ein bisschen Spaß muss sein (Ariola, June 2009)
- Nachts in Rom (Ariola, August 2010)
- Heimweh (D-One [Delta Music], November 2010)
- Sentimental Journey (2012)
- Dieter Thomas Heck präsentiert: 20 Jahre Captain Cook und seine singenden Saxophone – die deutsche Schlagerhitparade (2013)
- Die große Westernparty (August 2014)
- Das große Wunschkonzert (March 2015)
- Wie ein Stern (2015)
- Komm ein bisschen mit nach Italien (May 2016)
- 25 Jahre (February 2018)
