= Oscar Dudamel =

Classical trombonist

- Born: January 14, 1961 (age 64) Barquisimeto, Venezuela
- Instrument: Trombone
- Labels: Platoon
- Website: Official website

Oscar Dudamel is a classical trombonist. Born in Venezuela, he has been a member of numerous orchestras as well as a solo artist.

== Early life and education ==
Dudamel was born and raised in Barquisimeto, Venezuela. Hi parents purchased him a trombone as a kid and he played in his high school band. He would study music at the Yamaha Music Academy and developed his skills through El Sistema and training with Pablo Canela.

== Career ==
In addition to playing for the Youth Orchestra of El Sistema, he was also a member of the Liceo Mario Briceño Iragorry Band. He enrolled at the Vicente Emilio Sojo Music Conservatory and later started his own orchestra in Venezuela. He was also a member of the Lara Youth Symphony Orchestra. During his career, he has performed on stage with musicians that includeHéctor Lavoe, Ismael Rivera, Celia Cruz, Rubén Blades, and Oscar D'León to name a few.

Dudamel released his debut album Sueño Alcanzado in May 2025. The album is a collection of songs that were inspired by his years of musical experience. The album was created in Caracas, and is dedicated to his son Gustavo who also plays violin on the track. The album's first single, "La Rumba Me Llama", was released in March 2025 and peaked at No. 15 on the Billboard tropical charts. He followed up with the second single, "El Beso" in May 2025.

== Personal life ==
Dudamel resides in Spain and is the father of the famed orchestra conductor Gustavo Dudamel. As of 2025 he leads Oscar Dudamel y su Orquesta.
