= Achille Mouebo =

Congolese singer-songwriter (1971–2025)

- Born: 10 September 1971; Pointe-Noire, Congo-Brazzaville
- Died: 21 October 2025 (aged 54); Pointe-Noire, Republic of the Congo
- Occupation: Singer-songwriter

Achille Mouebo (10 September 1971 – 21 October 2025) was a Congolese singer-songwriter.

Mouebo specialised in traditional Kunyi rhythms combined with afrobeat and rock. He named his primary influences as Francis Cabrel, Tracy Chapman, Johnny Hallyday, and Lucky Dube. His distinctions included a nomination for a Kora Award in 2005 and the Prix du Tam-tam d’or in 2009.

Mouebo died in Pointe-Noire on 21 October 2025, at the age of 54.
