= Khaled Louma =

Algerian musician (1954 or 1955 – 2025)

Khaled Louma (1954 or 1955 – 24 August 2025) was an Algerian musician and radio presenter. A pioneer of Algerian rock, he founded the country’s first rock band, T34, and later became a leading figure on Channel 3 of Algerian French-language radio, where he hosted and produced music programs for four decades.

== Career ==
=== Music ===
Louma began his musical career in amateur groups. He founded the rock band T34 in the 1970s while attending university. The group initially played covers of English rock songs before developing original material and rising to prominence in the 1980s. Its best-known tracks include "Boualem El Far", considered an anthem for Algerian youth, as well as "Jamais doukh" ("You Will Never Be Surprised") and "Ma dir walou" ("You Won't Do Anything"). T34's sound combined Western rock elements with traditional Algerian rhythms, described by commentators as bridging chaabi and English rock. Louma’s musical approach was noted for its eclecticism, spanning rock, jazz, disco, funk, and Andalusian folk. He also founded another group, Les Icosiums.

T34 disbanded in the 1990s amid the Algerian Civil War. Louma continued making music, including a double album with T34 guitarist Mourad Rahali featuring re-recorded hits and new tracks.

In interviews, Rahali described Louma as reserved offstage but highly charismatic during performances, stating:

''The audience's reaction was incredible. And Khaled was truly a beast on stage. That was his world. […] Off stage, Khaled didn’t talk much. He listened a lot but felt uncomfortable in group debates. Yet on stage, he set the place on fire. His charisma was incredible, and the audience felt it.''

After a fifteen-year hiatus, Louma released the album An Algerian Dream, which featured English lyrics and combined elements of blues, jazz, and Maghrebi music.

=== Radio ===
After T34's dissolution, Louma pursued a career in broadcasting. From the 1990s onward, he hosted and produced music programs on Channel 3 of Algerian French-language radio, including Contact and Black Rock. He remained active in this role for four decades. Minister of Culture and Arts Zouhir Ballalou described him as "one of the key personalities of Channel 3 of national radio," noting his contributions to promoting cultural and artistic appreciation among listeners. Writer Arezki Metref noted that Louma brought a distinctive tone and deep musical knowledge to Channel 3 in the 1980s and 1990s, turning radio into "a space of freedom, discovery, and dialogue."

=== Other work ===
In 2019, Louma starred in the short film Winna, directed by the artist and painter Arezki Larbi.

== Personal life and death ==
Louma was born in Hadjout, where he completed his education. He was married to former Channel 3 journalist Naima Tazir, with whom he had a daughter.

Louma died on 24 August 2025, at the age of 70. The Presidency of Algeria, along with the Ministries of Culture and Communication, issued official condolences following his death.
