= Feya Faku =

South African trumpeter and flugelhornist (1962–2025)

Fezile "Feya" Faku
- Born: Fezile Faku; 6 June 1962 (age 63); New Brighton, Eastern Cape
- Died: 23 June 2025 (aged 63) Basel, Switzerland
- Instrument(s): Trumpet, Flugelhorn

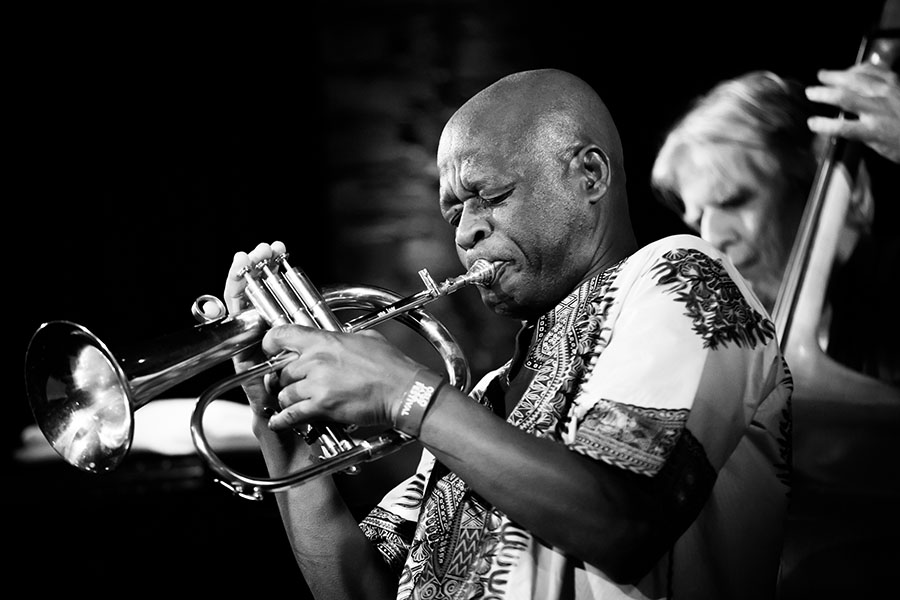
Feya Faku with Halles Komet, at Herr Nilsen, Oslo Jazzfestival 2017

Fezile "Feya" Faku (6 June 1962 – 23 June 2025) was a South African trumpeter and flugelhornist. Recognized for his contributions to jazz, Faku built a significant international presence, collaborating with prominent musicians and participating in prestigious festivals worldwide.

== Life and career ==
Faku was born in New Brighton, Port Elizabeth. His early musical talent was encouraged by South African jazz musicians such as Patrick Pasha, Dudley Tito and Whitey Kulumani, who mentored Faku. He then went to study at the University of Natal in Durban, where Darius Brubeck had established the country’s first school of jazz and popular music in the early 1980s. Recognising the nascent talent of Faku and three other new students, and their unofficial student status, Brubeck and his wife Catherine allowed all four to stay in their house, despite the strictures of apartheid. In the 1990s, he joined various local jazz ensembles and his exceptional talent quickly garnered attention, leading to collaborations with South African jazz legends like Abdullah Ibrahim, Bheki Mseleku, and Zim Ngqawana.

Faku died in Basel, Switzerland on 23 June 2025, at the age of 63. He was due to perform at the Bird’s Eye Club there.
