= Christina Katrakis =

Christina Kushch Katrakis
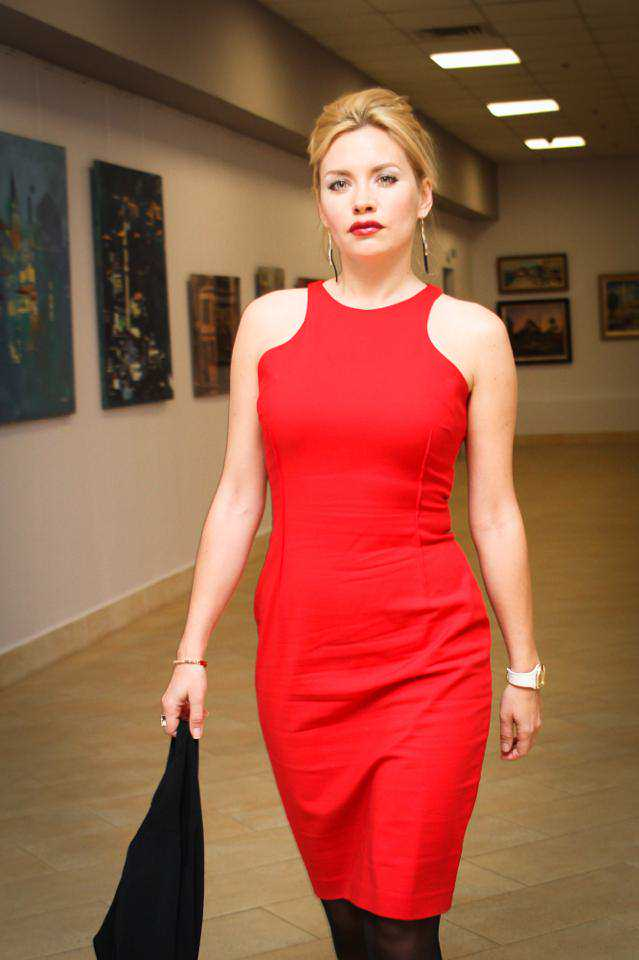
- Christina Kushch Katrakis
- Born: Christina Marie Kushch; Kyiv, Ukraine
- Known for: Ambassador for the Foundation for United Nations SDG, International Political Coordinator for The Delahunt Group & BGR (Washington D.C.), International Investment Coordinator for the Andesite Blue LLC British Investment Fund (London), official international coordinator of the United Nations Agenda 2030 SDG Global initiative in partnership with the FFUN and official international coordinator of UNESCO for the UNESCO Center of Bologna, painting, curatorship, philanthropy, producer in Hollywood MO’z art pictures and Visionairemedia
- Awards: “Freedom to Create” Global Award for ‘The Zone’ series of works, 2010
- Website: katrakis.com

Christina Katrakis is an International coordinator and curator, writer, artist, Ambassador for the Foundation for United Nations SDG, in charge of the Humanitarian Aid Base FFUNSDG-HELP.UA in Vorokhta, Ukraine as an Ambassador for International Relations, Foundation for United Nations SDG. International Political Coordinator for The Delahunt Group & BGR, International Investment Coordinator for the Andesite Blue LLC British Investment Fund, an official international coordinator of the United Nations Agenda 2030 SDG Global initiative in partnership with the FFUN, and official international coordinator of UNESCO for the UNESCO Center of Bologna, producer in Hollywood MO’z art pictures and Visionairemedia, an American artist (sculptor, painter) and writer. She is a US citizen.

== Early life and education ==
Katrakis is the daughter of Anatoliy Kushch-Katrakis and Helen Pilkevich-Kushch. Her father is a well known sculptor and author of many historical monuments in the United States, Iran, Libya, Ukraine and Poland. He resides in Kyiv, Ukraine. Her mother is an ethnographer and an art historian. She officially took the double second name Kushch-Katrakis because of the Greek legacy of her ancestors, who were Cretan and Pontic Greeks, who migrated long ago to Ukraine, according to her father.

Katrakis founded the International Academy of Arts in 2005 which is now based in Munich, Germany.

Katrakis comes from a family with a rich heritage: maternal grandfather – last king of Georgia and Armenia (Bagrationi and Dadiani royal lines) and royal prince of Lithuania ( Yagailo Gedimin royal line) – Simon Bagration Dadiani Gedimin Pilke, his grandmother on paternal line was Isabella de Savoy from royal family of Savoy kings of Piemonte and Sardinia. Maternal grandmother – the countess of Poland and Ukraine, granddaughter of countess Ewelina Hańska, the wife of Honoré de Balzac. Paternal line: Father a sculptor Anatoliy Kushch (Katrakis), comes from a family of Cretan artists as well as his cousin Manos Katrakis, famous Greek actor.

Christina became a model of the Berehynia statue on the Independence Monument in Kyiv, which was made by her father Anatoliy Kushch. The statue is made of cast bronze and weighs about 20 tons.

At the age of ten, Katrakis moved to Chicago in the USA with her parents. Her father received a request to create a monument in Chicago.

From 1992 to 1993, Katrakis studied at the English International Institute for Foreign Languages and Diplomacy in Washington. From 1993 to 1994, she continued her studies at St. Nicholas Catholic School. In Maryland, Katrakis concurrently attended the specialist school "Glen Eco."

From 1994 to 1998, she studied in Kyiv at the Shevchenko State Art School. From 1996 to 1998, she also studied arts, art history and anatomy in Italy and France (Lorenzo di Medici' Academy in Florence and Sorbonne University in Paris). From 1998 to 2000, Katrakis studied at the National Academy of Visual Arts and Architecture in Kyiv.

In 2002, Christina received a Bachelor of Arts and Bachelor of Fine Arts degrees from Arkansas State University. In 2003, she received a Master's degree from the same university. In 2005, Katrakis defended her thesis at the University of Memphis. From 2004 to 2006, Katrakis taught drawing, structural drawing/anatomy, painting, and watercolor, defended her thesis, terminal degree in Arts and History (PHD equivalent) at the University of Memphis.

During an interview with the CBC and in social media posts on January 31, 2022, an emotional Katrakis appealed to the West to send soldiers to fight 'shoulder to shoulder' with Ukrainians against Russia. She compared the situation of her fellow Ukrainians to that of the Jews in World War II, saying, 'Brothers and sisters - How is it to watch us die on New Year?! Are you ready to stand shoulder to shoulder against this universal terror or will you simply continue to watch us die defending You?!'

== Participation in exhibitions as a painter ==
- 2002 Exhibit after Minoan culture, as a senior graduate, Jonesboro, Arkansas, USA
- 2004 "Moments of life", "Elisavetgrad" exhibition, Kirovohrad, Ukraine.
- 2008 Personal exhibition in Kyiv, Ukraine, Europe.
- 2010 "Neo-Symbolism: Bridges to the Unknown”, Chicago, IL, USA.
- 2010 “Prism Art Exhibition”, Memphis, USA.
- 2011 “The Little Prince”, The Chocolate cake Museum, Kyiv, Ukraine, Europe.
- 2011 “The picture of the World. Free look”, The Chocolate cake Museum, Kyiv, Ukraine, Europe
- 2011 "The Zone", New York, USA.
- 2011 "11th European festival of the Nude Photography: Glances at the body”, Europe.
- 2011 Personal exhibition in Kyiv, Ukraine, Europe.
- 2011 “Arising” exhibition, Kyiv, Ukraine, Europe.
- 2013 “Art World”, Dnipropetrovsk, Ukraine, Europe.
- 2013 “Moments of Time”, Dnipropetrovsk, Ukraine, Europe.
- 2014 “Ultra Violet Light”, with Igor Kalinauskas.

== Private life ==
Christina Katrakis is married to Roman Kudlay. They have a son.
