= 2025 deaths in the United States (July–September) =

- Decades: 2000s; 2010s; 2020s; 2030s
- See also: History of the United States (2016–present); Timeline of United States history (2010–present); List of years in the United States

The following notable deaths in the United States occurred in July–September 2025. Names are reported under the date of death, in alphabetical order as set out in WP:NAMESORT. A typical entry reports information in the following sequence: Name, age, country of citizenship at birth and subsequent nationality (if applicable), what subject was noted for, year of birth (if known), and reference.

== July ==
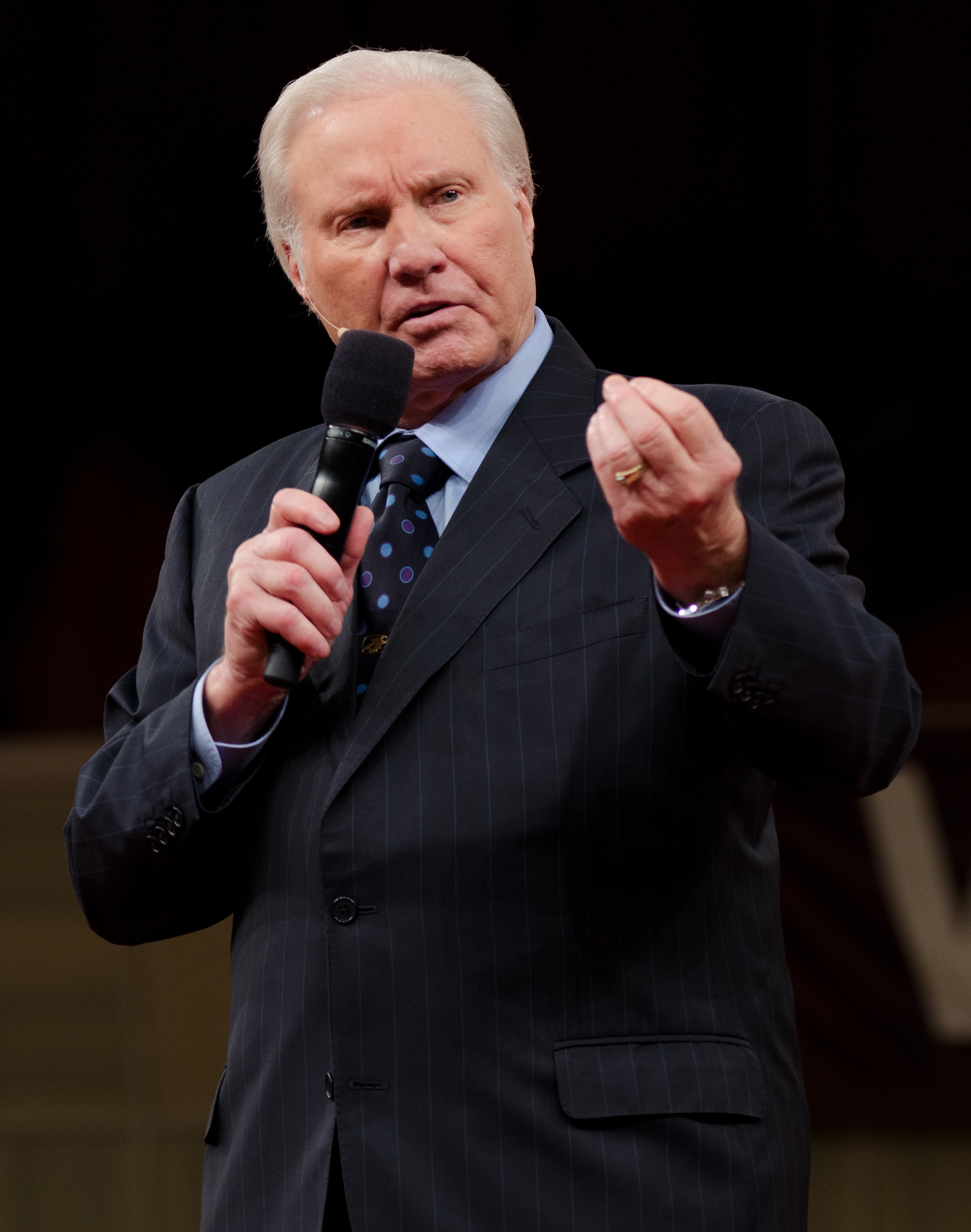
Jimmy Swaggart

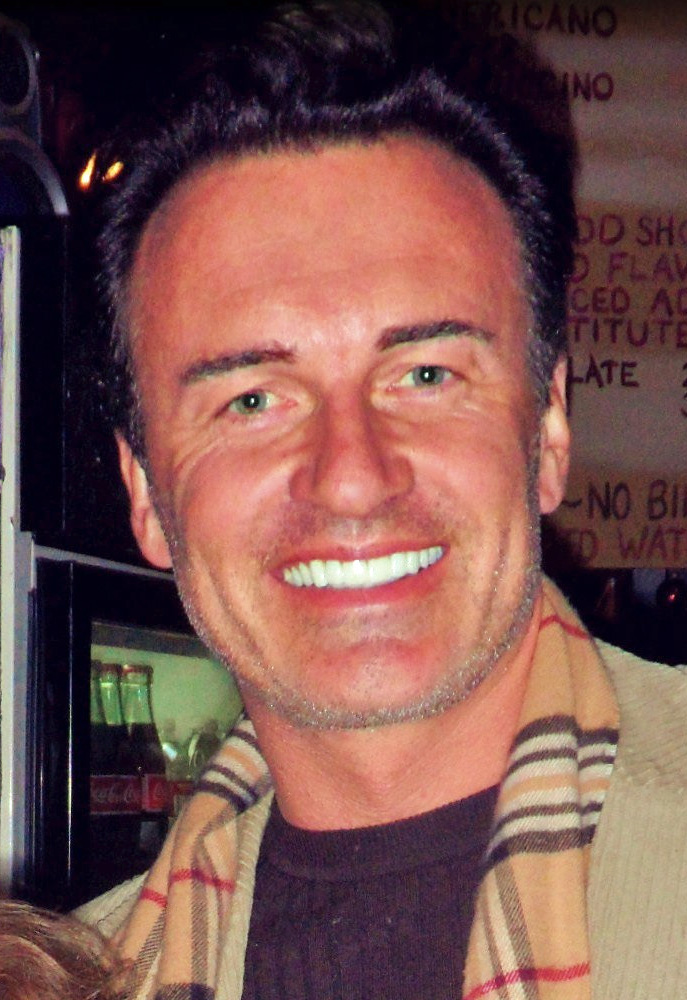
Julian McMahon

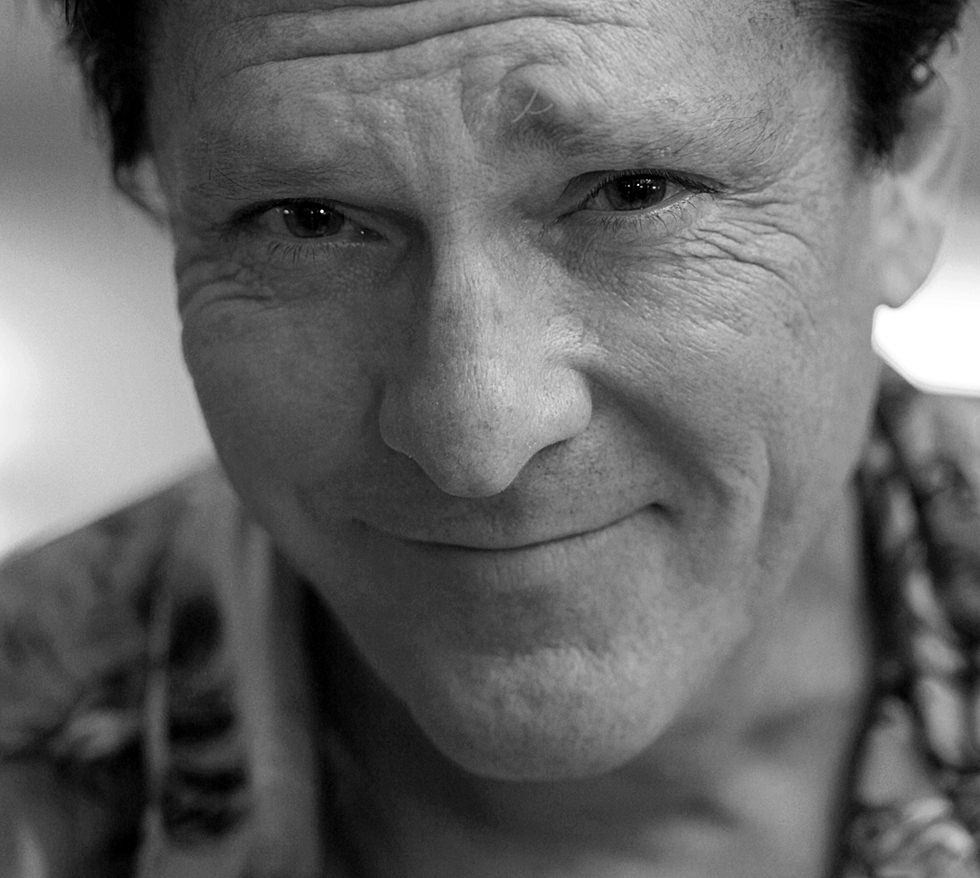
Michael Madsen

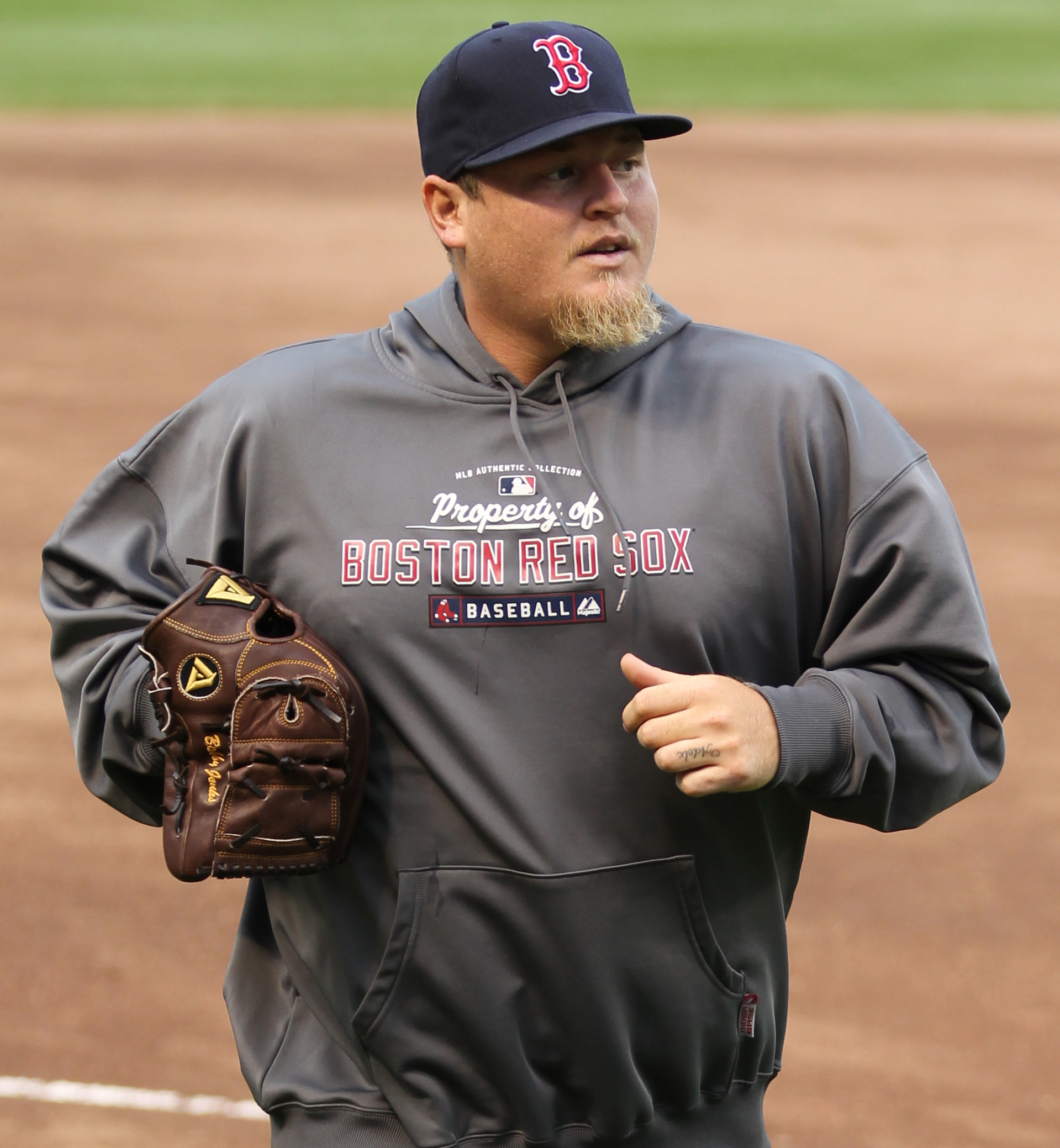
Bobby Jenks

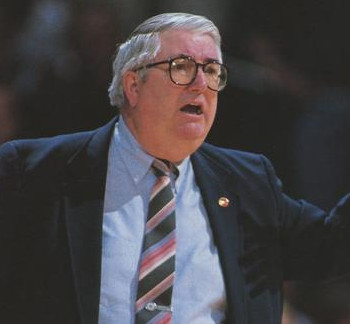
Frank Layden

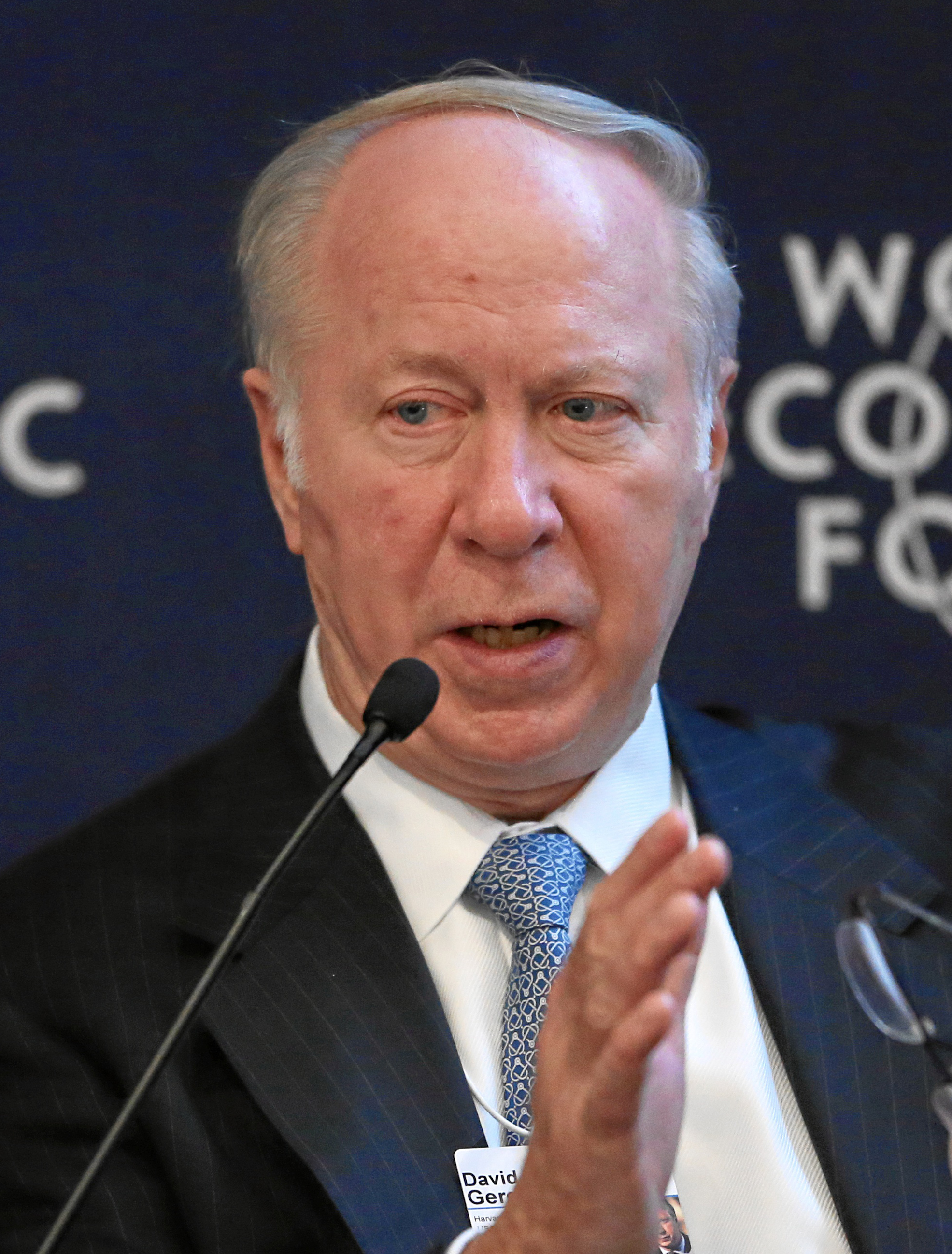
David Gergen

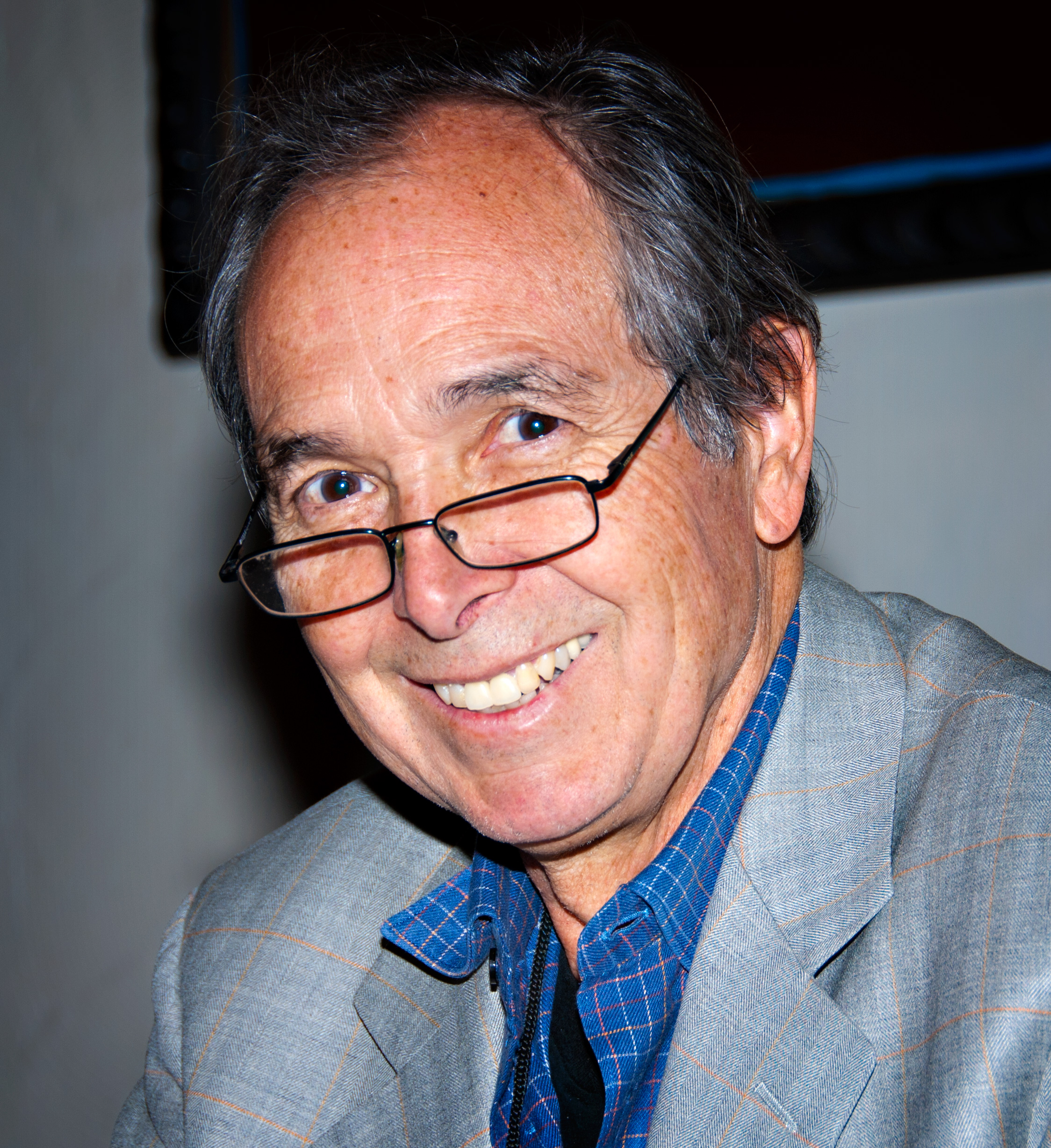
Martin Cruz Smith

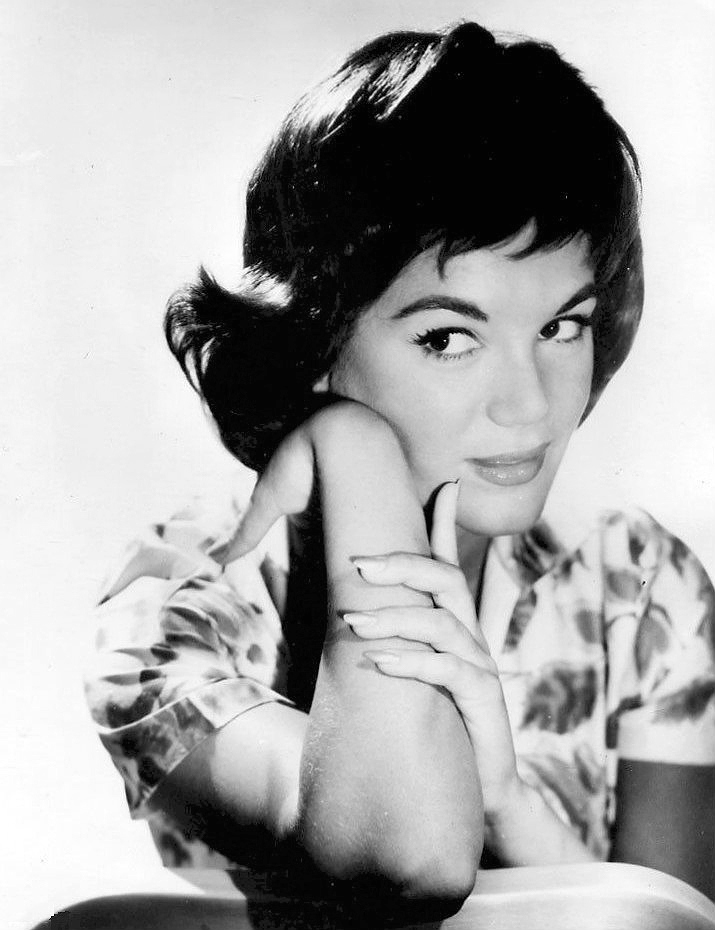
Connie Francis

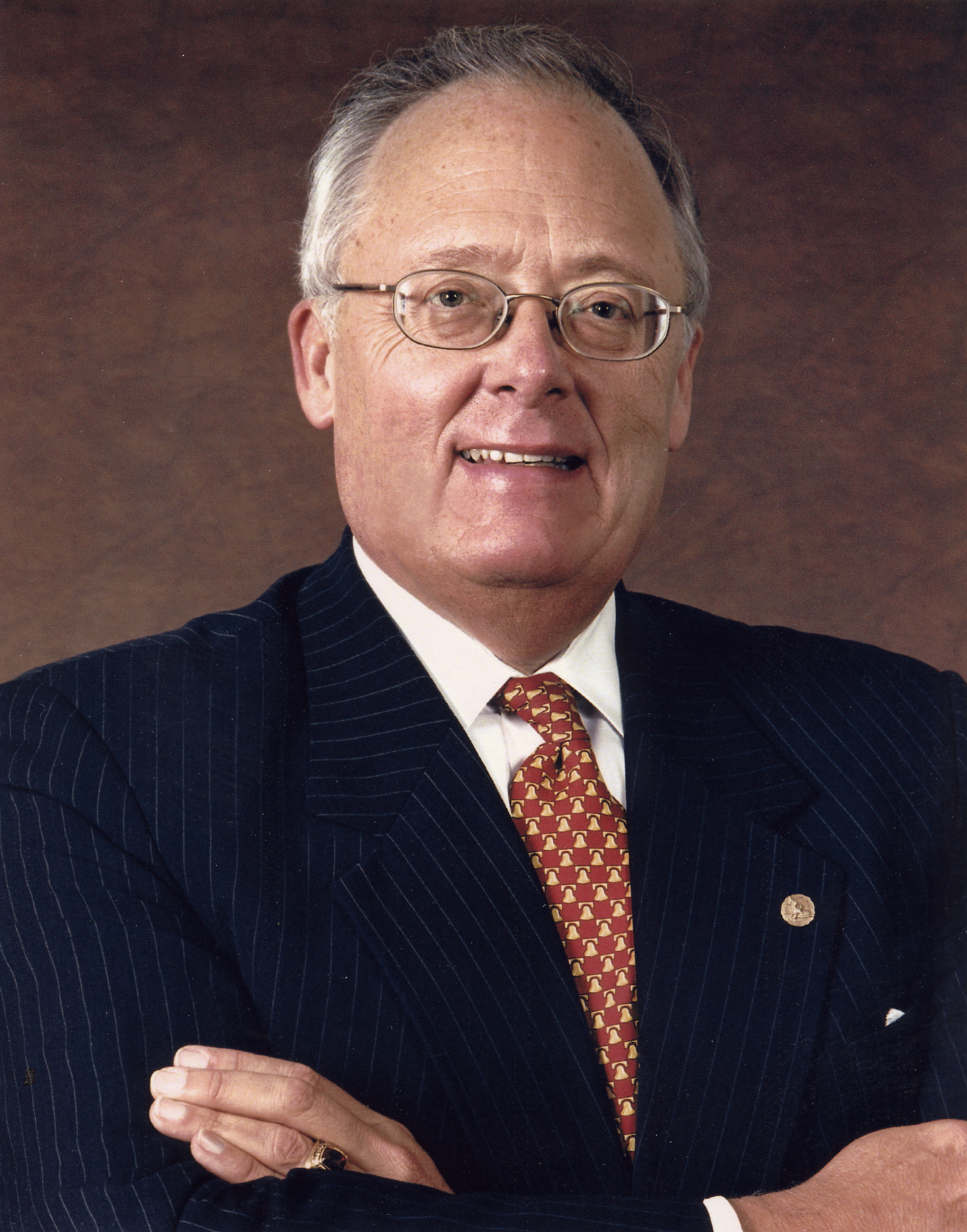
Edwin Feulner

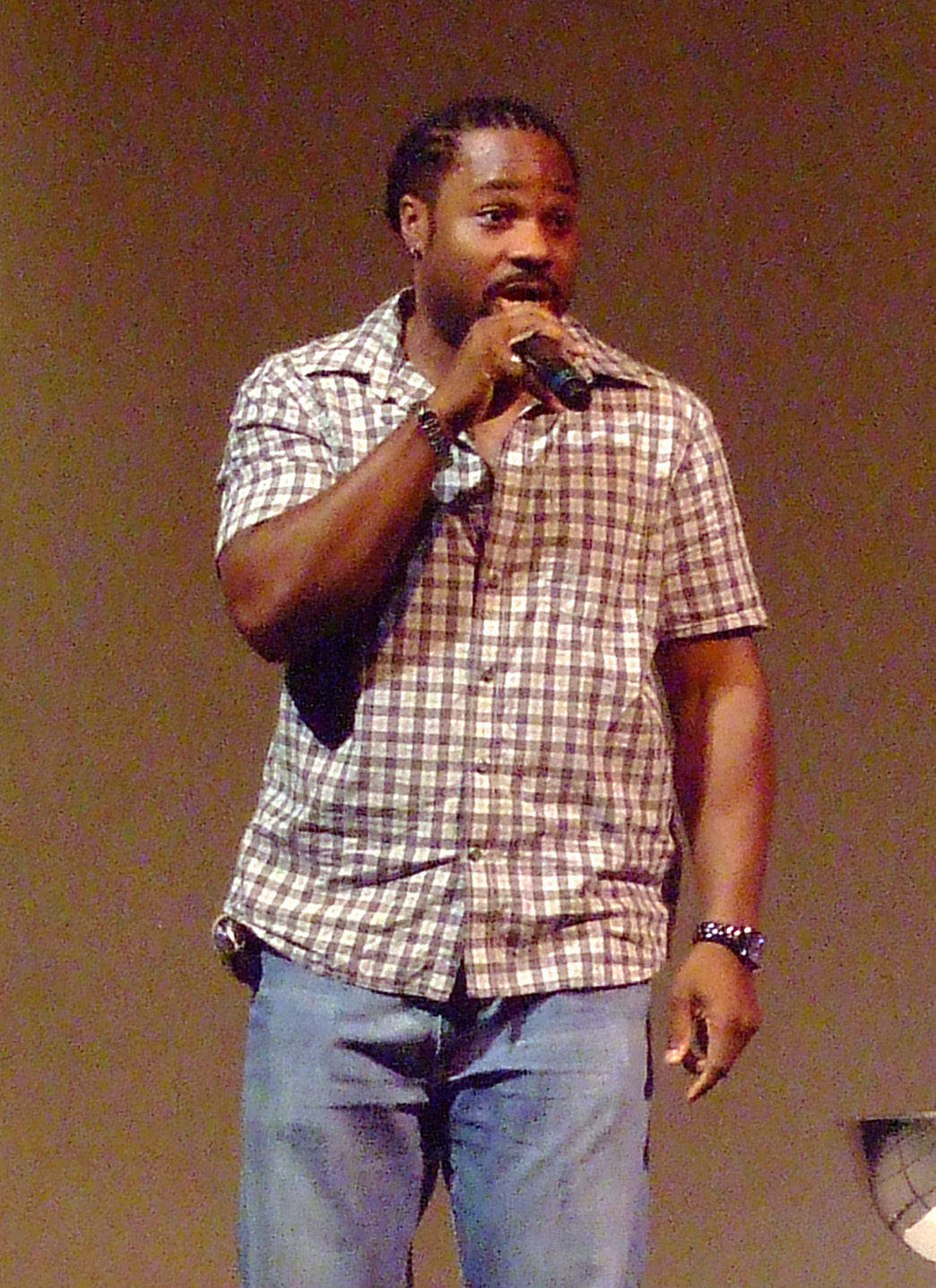
Malcolm-Jamal Warner

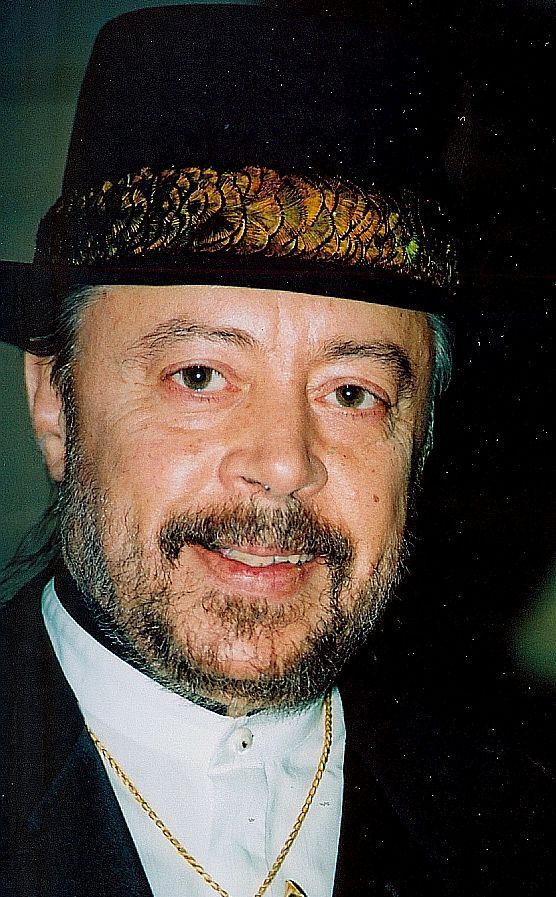
Chuck Mangione

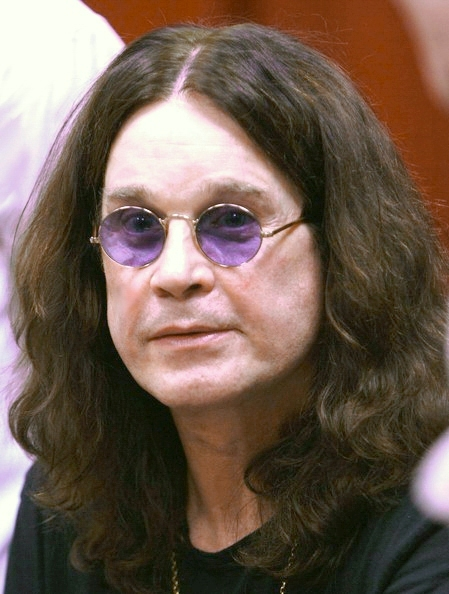
Ozzy Osbourne

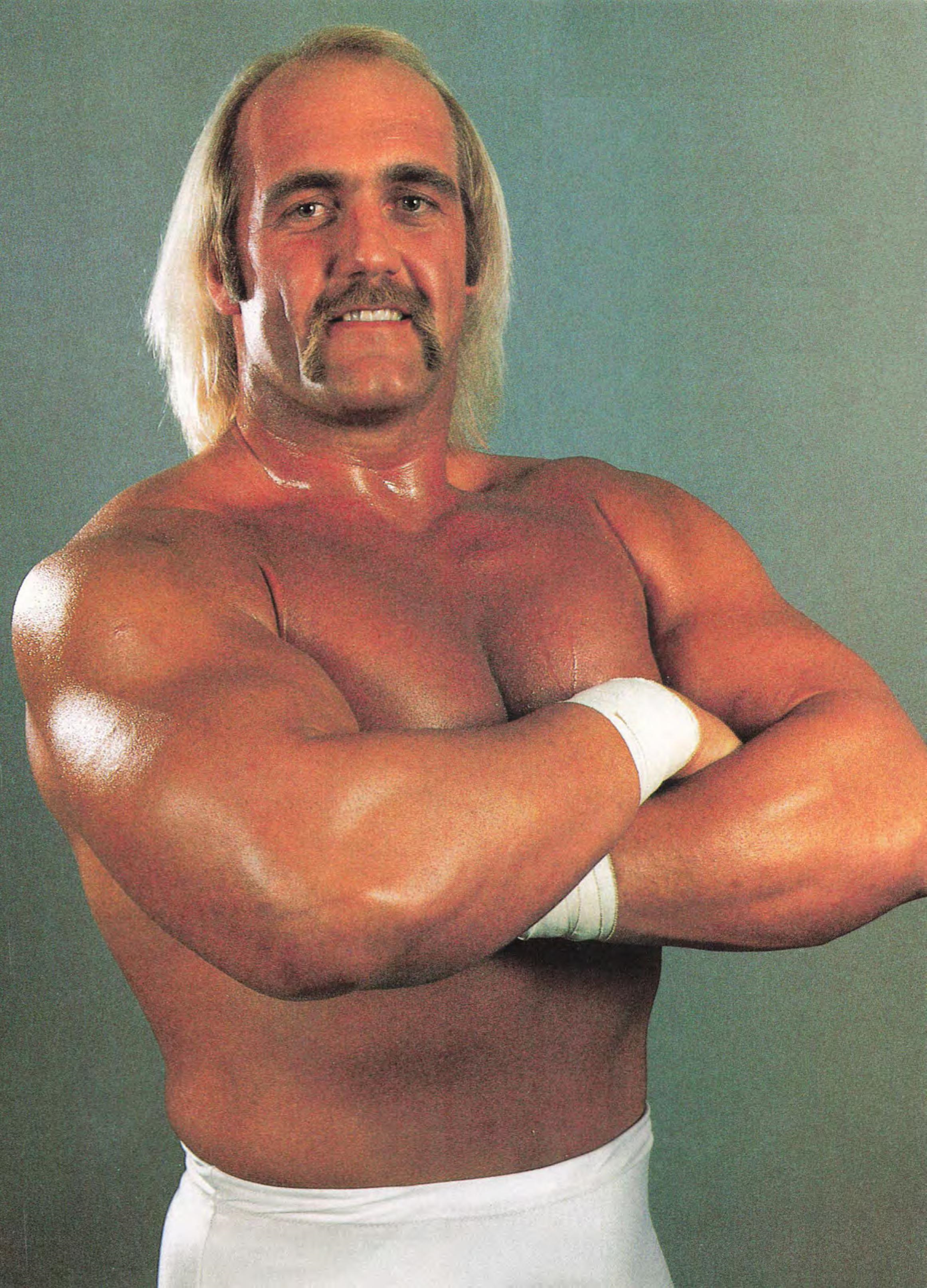
Hulk Hogan

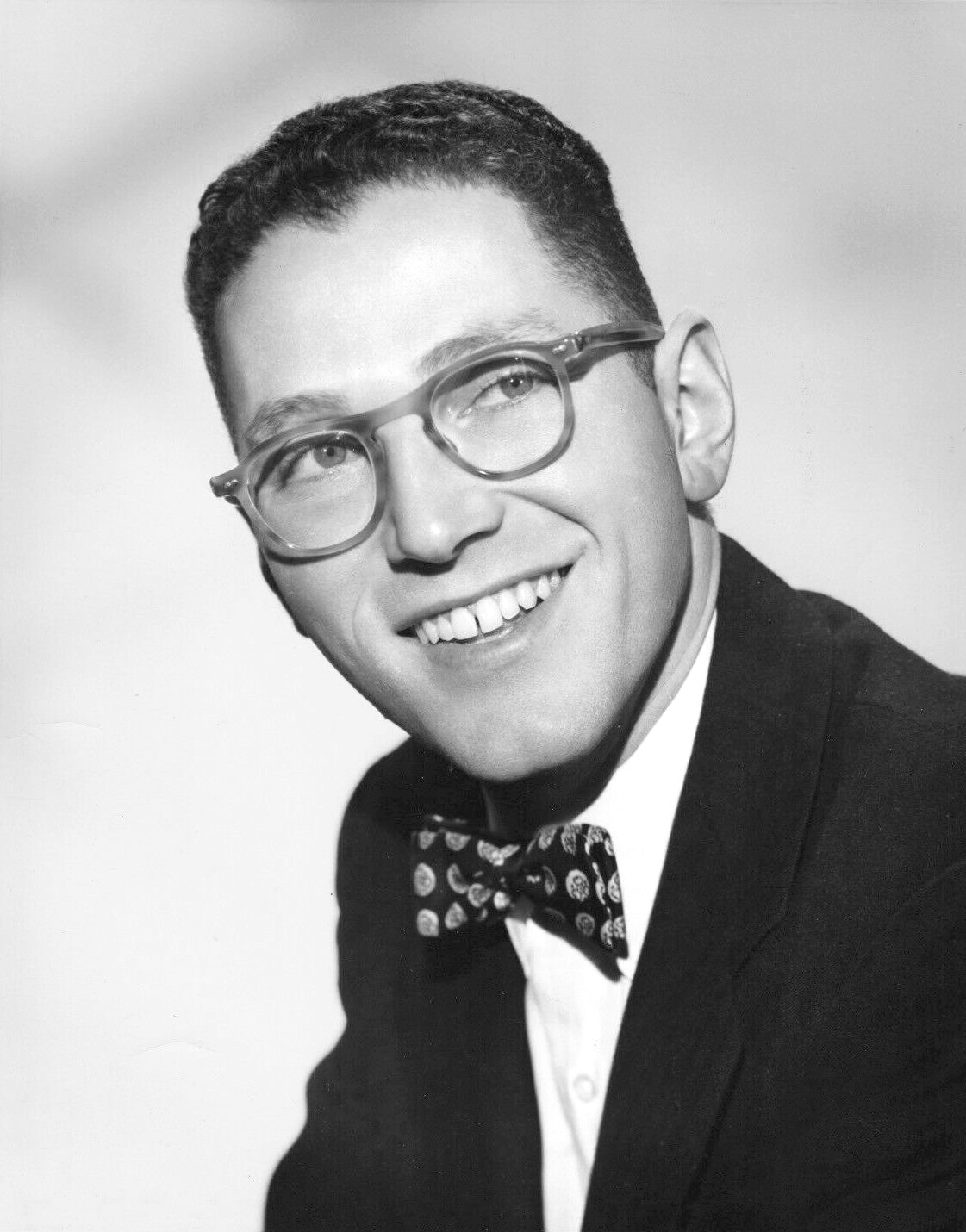
Tom Lehrer

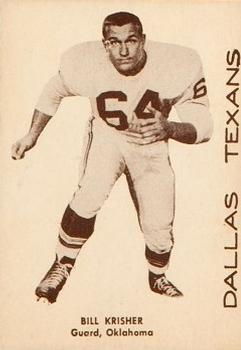
Bill Krisher

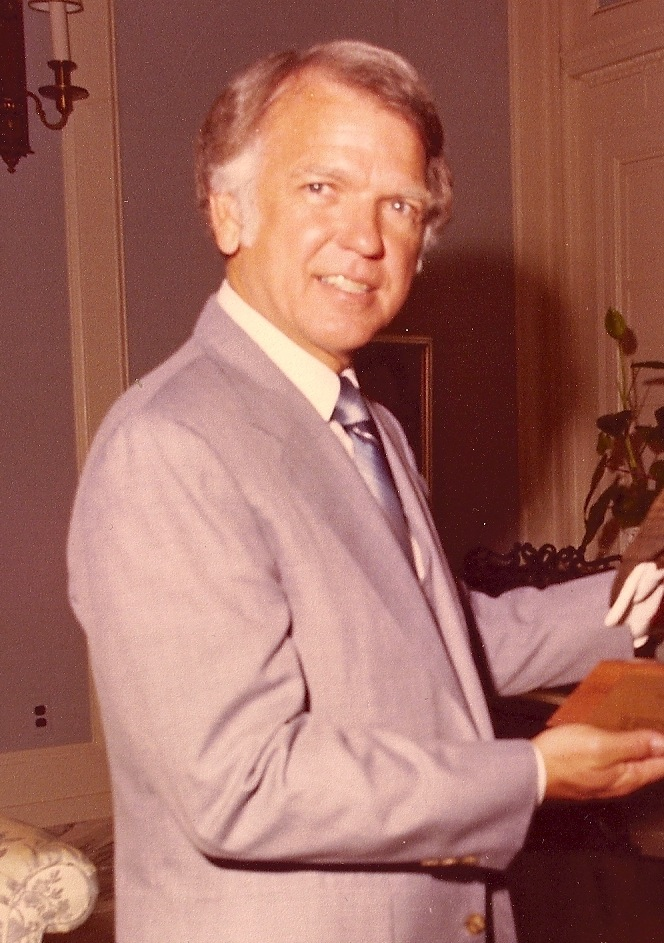
George Nigh

- July 1
  - Samuel G. Bonasso, 85, entrepreneur and civil engineer (b. 1939)
  - Robert Bruce, 58, racing driver (b. 1967)
  - Carl Frederick Mengeling, 94, Roman Catholic prelate, bishop of Lansing (1996–2008) (b. 1930)
  - Scott Haring, 67, game designer (Car Wars) (b. 1958)
  - Rudy Silbaugh, 94, politician, member of the Wisconsin State Assembly (1990–1996) (b. 1930)
  - Jimmy Swaggart, 90, televangelist and gospel musician (b. 1935)
- July 2
  - David O. Dykes, 72, baptist minister (b. 1953)
  - John C. Harris, 81, horse breeder, owner of Harris Ranch (b. 1943)
  - Sophia Hutchins, 29, talent manager, charity executive and television personality (I am Cait) (b. 1996)
  - Neal Justin, 89, politician and professor, member of the Arizona House of Representatives (1965–1966) (b. 1936)
  - Douglas Loeffler, 93, politician, member of the Florida House of Representatives (1961–1964) (b. 1932)
  - Julian McMahon, 56, Australian-born actor (Nip/Tuck, Fantastic Four, Home and Away) (b. 1968)
  - Anna Ornstein, 98, Hungarian-born Holocaust survivor (b. 1927)
  - Dan Siegel, 79, civil rights attorney (b. 1945/1946)
  - David Fenwick Wilson, 95, American-born Canadian organist (b. 1929)
- July 3
  - Francis Bell, 82, politician, member of the South Carolina State Senate (b. 1943)
  - Billy Hunter, 97, baseball player (St. Louis Browns, Baltimore Orioles) and manager (Texas Rangers) (b. 1928)
  - Michael Madsen, 67, actor (Reservoir Dogs, Die Another Day, Kill Bill: Volume 2) (b. 1957)
- July 4
  - Lyndon Byers, 61, Canadian-born ice hockey player (Boston Bruins, San Jose Sharks) and radio host (b. 1964)
  - Michael Dinwiddie, 70, playwright (b. 1954)
  - Richard Greenberg, 67, playwright (Three Days of Rain, Take Me Out), Tony winner (2003) (b. 1958) (death announced on this date)
  - Bobby Jenks, 44, baseball player (Chicago White Sox, Boston Red Sox) (b. 1981)
  - Ed Rombola, 88, actor (Indians) (b. 1937)
  - Mark Snow, 78, film and television composer (The X-Files, Smallville, Blue Bloods) (b. 1946)
  - Young Noble, 47, rapper (Outlawz) (b. 1978)
- July 5
  - David Boger, 85, American-born Australian chemical engineer (b. 1939)
  - J. Wade Gilley, 86, academic, president of the University of Tennessee system (1999–2001) and Marshall University (1991–1999), Virginia secretary of education (1978–1982) (b. 1938)
  - William Hoge, 79, politician, member of the California State Assembly (1992–1996) (b. 1946)
  - Jonathan Ott, 76, ethnobotanist, chemist and writer, co-creator of the term entheogen (b. 1949)
  - John A. Sabatini, 79, politician, member of the Rhode Island Senate (1981–1993) (b. 1945)
- July 6
  - Ed Fiori, 72, professional golfer, four-time PGA Tour winner (b. 1953)
- July 7
  - Mosie Burks, 92, gospel singer (Mississippi Mass Choir) (b. 1933/1934)
  - Edward Lucyk, 82, politician, member of the Pennsylvania House of Representatives (1981–2002) (b. 1942)
  - Pettis Norman, 86, football player (Dallas Cowboys, San Diego Chargers) (b. 1939)
  - Gábor A. Somorjai, 90, Hungarian-born academic (b. 1935)
  - Jewel Thais-Williams, 86, activist and dance bar owner (Jewel's Catch One) (b. 1939)
- July 8
  - Steve Benson, 71, editorial cartoonist (Arizona Republic, Arizona Mirror), complications from a stroke.
  - James Carter Cathcart, 71, voice actor (Pokémon, Yu-Gi-Oh! Duel Monsters, Sonic X) (b. 1954)
  - Tim Cronin, 63, drummer (Monster Magnet) (b. 1961/1962)
  - Edward D. DiPrete, 91, politician and convicted criminal, mayor of Cranston (1978–1985) and governor of Rhode Island (1985–1991) (b. 1934)
  - David Flebotte, 65, television writer and producer (Desperate Housewives, 8 Simple Rules, Masters of Sex) (b. 1959)
  - Sara J. Harper, 98, lawyer (b. 1926)
  - Alan G. Hassenfeld, 76, toy industry executive, CEO and chairman of Hasbro (1989–2008) (b. 1948)
  - Fanny Howe, 84, poet (b. 1940)
  - Roy William Ide III, 85, lawyer (b. 1940)
  - Paulette Jiles, 82, author (News of the World) (b. 1943)
- July 9
  - Joseph A. Capineri, 96, politician, member of the Rhode Island House of Representatives (1957–1980) (b. 1929)
  - Joe Coleman, 78, baseball player (Washington Senators, Detroit Tigers, Chicago Cubs) (b. 1947)
  - Lee Elia, 87, baseball player (Chicago White Sox, Chicago Cubs) and executive (Philadelphia Phillies) (b. 1937)
  - Frank Layden, 93, basketball coach and executive (Utah Jazz) (b. 1932)
  - C. M. Naim, 89, Indian-born literary scholar (b. 1936)
  - Ryan Reid, 38, basketball player (Florida State Seminoles, Tulsa 66ers, Oklahoma City Thunder) (b. 1986)
  - Alexander F. Schilt, 84, academic, president of the University of Houston–Downtown (1980–1987) (b. 1941)
- July 10
  - Arthur Coia, 82, labor union leader, president of LIUNA (1993–1999) (b. 1943)
  - David Gergen, 83, political commentator and former presidential adviser (b. 1942)
- July 11
  - Rene Kirby, 70, actor (Shallow Hal, Stuck on You, Carnivàle) (b. 1955)
  - William J. Rutter, 97, biochemist (b. 1927)
  - Luis Sharpe, 65, Cuban-born football player (UCLA Bruins, St. Louis Cardinals, Memphis Showboats) (b. 1960)
  - Martin Cruz Smith, 82, author (Gorky Park) (b. 1942)
- July 13
  - David Adickes, 98, sculptor (b. 1927)
  - Jack Cera, 69, politician, member of the Ohio House of Representatives (1983–1996, 2011–2020) (b. 1955/1956)
  - Michael Diedrich, 70, politician, member of the South Dakota Senate (1987–1991, 1993–1995) and House of Representatives (2017–2021) (b. 1954)
  - Billy Eisenberg, 87, bridge player (b. 1937)
  - Richard H. Fallon Jr., 73, legal scholar (b. 1952)
- July 14
  - Bill Chamberlain, 75, basketball player (Memphis Tams, Kentucky Colonels, Phoenix Suns) (b. 1949)
  - Eileen Fulton, 91, actress (As the World Turns) (b. 1933)
  - Andrea Gibson, 49, poet and activist, Poet Laureate of Colorado (b. 1975)
  - Lamont Green, 49, football player (Atlanta Falcons, Carolina Panthers) (b. 1979)
  - Bobby L. Harnage, 85, labor leader, AFGE president (1997–2003) (b. 1939)
  - John MacArthur, 86, pastor, Christian theologian and author (b. 1939)
  - Victor McElheny, 89, science writer and journalist (b. 1935)
  - William Henry Stafford Jr., 94, jurist, judge (since 1975) and chief judge (1981–1993) of the U.S. District Court of Northern Florida (b. 1931)
- July 15
  - Roseann Bentley, 89, politician, member of the Missouri Senate (1995–2003) (b. 1936)
  - Saul Elkin, 93, actor and director, founder of Shakespeare in Delaware Park (b. 1932)
  - Robert A. Funk, 85, banker, chairman of the Federal Reserve Bank of Kansas City (2005–2007) (b. 1940)
  - Hani Mahmassani, 69, Lebanese-born engineer (b. 1956)
  - Jack McAuliffe, 80, brewer (b. 1945)
  - Michael Patella, 70, theologian (b. 1954)
  - Alexander F. Schilt, 84, academic, president of the University of Houston–Downtown (1980–1987) (b. 1941) (death announced on this date)
- July 16
  - Bill Clay, 94, politician, member of the U.S. House of Representatives (1969–2001) (b. 1931)
  - Connie Francis, 87, singer ("Who's Sorry Now?", "Pretty Little Baby") and actress (Where the Boys Are) (b. 1937)
  - Gary Karr, 83, double bassist (b. 1941)
- July 17
  - Alan Bergman, 99, composer and songwriter (b. 1925)
  - Bryan Braman, 38, football player (Houston Texans, Philadelphia Eagles), Super bowl champion (2018) (b. 1987)
  - Jake Larson, 102, World War II veteran and TikToker (b. 1922)
  - Bill Neukom, 83, baseball executive, owner of San Francisco Giants (2008–2011), and lawyer, president of the American Bar Association (2007–2008), Microsoft chief counsel for Apple Computer, Inc. v. Microsoft Corp. (b. 1942) (death announced on this date)
- July 18
  - Joseph Casello, 73, politician, member of the Florida House of Representatives (since 2018) (b. 1952)
  - Helen Cornelius, 83, country singer-songwriter (b. 1941)
  - Edwin Feulner, 83, political scientist, founder of The Heritage Foundation (b. 1941)
  - Hal Galper, 87, jazz pianist, composer, and bandleader (b. 1938)
  - Jimmy Hunt, 85, actor (Pitfall, Cheaper by the Dozen, Invaders from Mars) (b. 1939)
  - Robert M. Stein, 75, political scientist (b. 1950)
  - Graylin Warner, 62, basketball player (Louisiana Ragin' Cajuns) (b. 1962)
  - Kenneth Washington, 88, actor (Hogan's Heroes, Changes, Westworld) (b. 1935)
  - Rex White, 95, Hall of Fame racing driver, NASCAR Cup Series champion (1960) (b. 1929) (death announced on this date)
- July 19
  - Charles Augins, 81, choreographer (Red Dwarf, Labyrinth, Five Guys Named Moe) and dancer (b. 1943)
  - Jeff Bittiger, 63, baseball player (Chicago White Sox, Philadelphia Phillies, Minnesota Twins) (b. 1962)
  - Joanna Macy, 96, environmentalist (b. 1939)
  - Michael Ranville, 81, political consultant and author (b. 1943)
  - Ross Rowland, 85, railroad preservationist (b. 1940)
  - Joe Vigil, 95, track and field coach (b. 1929)
- July 20
  - Donald Soffer, 92, businessman and real estate developer (b. 1932)
  - Tom Troupe, 97, actor (Star Trek: The Original Series, Mission: Impossible, My Own Private Idaho) and writer (b. 1928)
- July 21
  - Bruce Anderson, 75, politician, member of the Minnesota House of Representatives (1995–2013) and the Senate (since 2013) (b. 1950)
  - Roy Black, 80, attorney (b. 1945)
  - Thomas Anthony Durkin, 78, criminal defense attorney (b. 1946)
  - Malcolm-Jamal Warner, 54, actor (The Cosby Show, Malcolm & Eddie, Reed Between the Lines) (b. 1970) (death announced on this date)
- July 22
  - Chuck Mangione, 84, jazz flugelhornist, trumpeter and composer (b. 1940)
  - Ozzy Osbourne, 76, English-born Hall of Fame musician (Black Sabbath), songwriter ("Paranoid"), and television personality (The Osbournes) (b. 1948)
  - Alfie Wise, 82, actor (The Cannonball Run, Stroker Ace, Smokey and the Bandit) (b. 1942)
- July 23
  - Michael Ochs, 82, photographic activist (b. 1943)
  - Arnold Palacios, 69, Governor of the Northern Mariana Islands (b. 1955)
  - Ron Silverman, 92, film producer (Brubaker) (b. 1932)
- July 24
  - Hulk Hogan, 71, Hall of Fame professional wrestler (AWA, WWE), actor (Rocky III) and television personality (b. 1953)
  - Tommy McLain, 85, swamp pop singer-songwriter (b. 1940)
- July 26
  - Tom Lehrer, 97, songwriter, satirist and mathematician (b. 1928)
- July 28
  - Wallis Annenberg, 86, philanthropist (b. 1939)
  - Mildred Barnes Griggs, 83, academic (b. 1942)
  - Bonnie D. Parkin, 84, religion leader, Relief Society General President (2002–2007) (b. 1940)
  - Ryne Sandberg, 65, Hall of Fame baseball player (Chicago Cubs) and coach (Philadelphia Phillies) (b. 1959)
- July 29
  - Thomas J. Balkany, 77, ear surgeon (b. 1948)
  - Tommy Brooks, 71, boxing trainer (Evander Holyfield, Mike Tyson) (b. 1954)
  - Tom Cousins, 93, real estate developer, philanthropist and basketball executive, owner of the Atlanta Hawks (1968–1977) (b. 1931)
  - Bill Krisher, 89, football player (Pittsburgh Steelers, Dallas Texans) (b. 1935)
  - Robert Major Walker, 81, politician, mayor of Vicksburg, Mississippi (1988–2001) (b. 1943/1944)
- July 30
  - William K. Brehm, 96, businessman and philanthropist, assistant secretary of the army (manpower and reserve affairs) (1968–1970) and assistant secretary of defense for legislative affairs (1976–1977) (b. 1929)
  - Nicholas Clapp, 89, filmmaker and writer (b. 1936)
  - T. S. Ellis III, 85, jurist, judge of the U.S. District Court for Eastern Virginia (since 1987) (b. 1940)
  - George Nigh, 98, politician and academic administrator, governor (1963, 1979–1987) and twice lieutenant governor of Oklahoma, president of the University of Central Oklahoma (1992–1997) (b. 1927)
- July 31
  - Flaco Jiménez, 86, musician (Texas Tornados, Los Super Seven) (b. 1939)
  - Robert Wilson, 83, experimental theatre director and playwright (Einstein on the Beach), founder of The Watermill Center (b. 1941)
  - Edward Zakrzewski, 60, convicted murderer (b. 1965)

== August ==
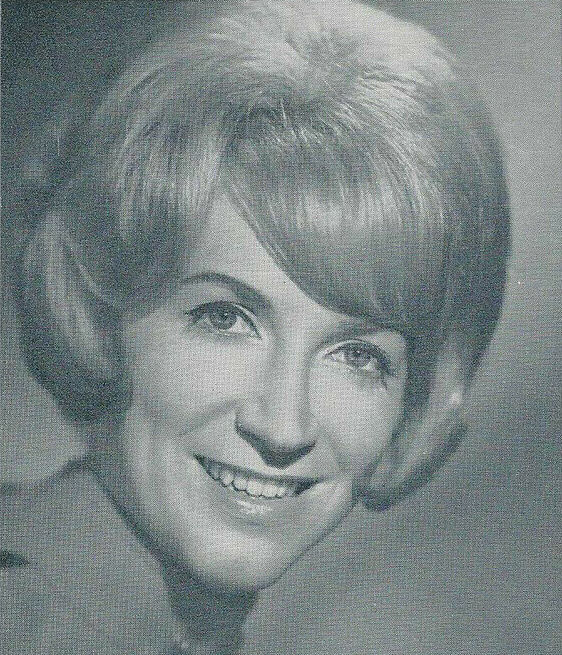
Jeannie Seely

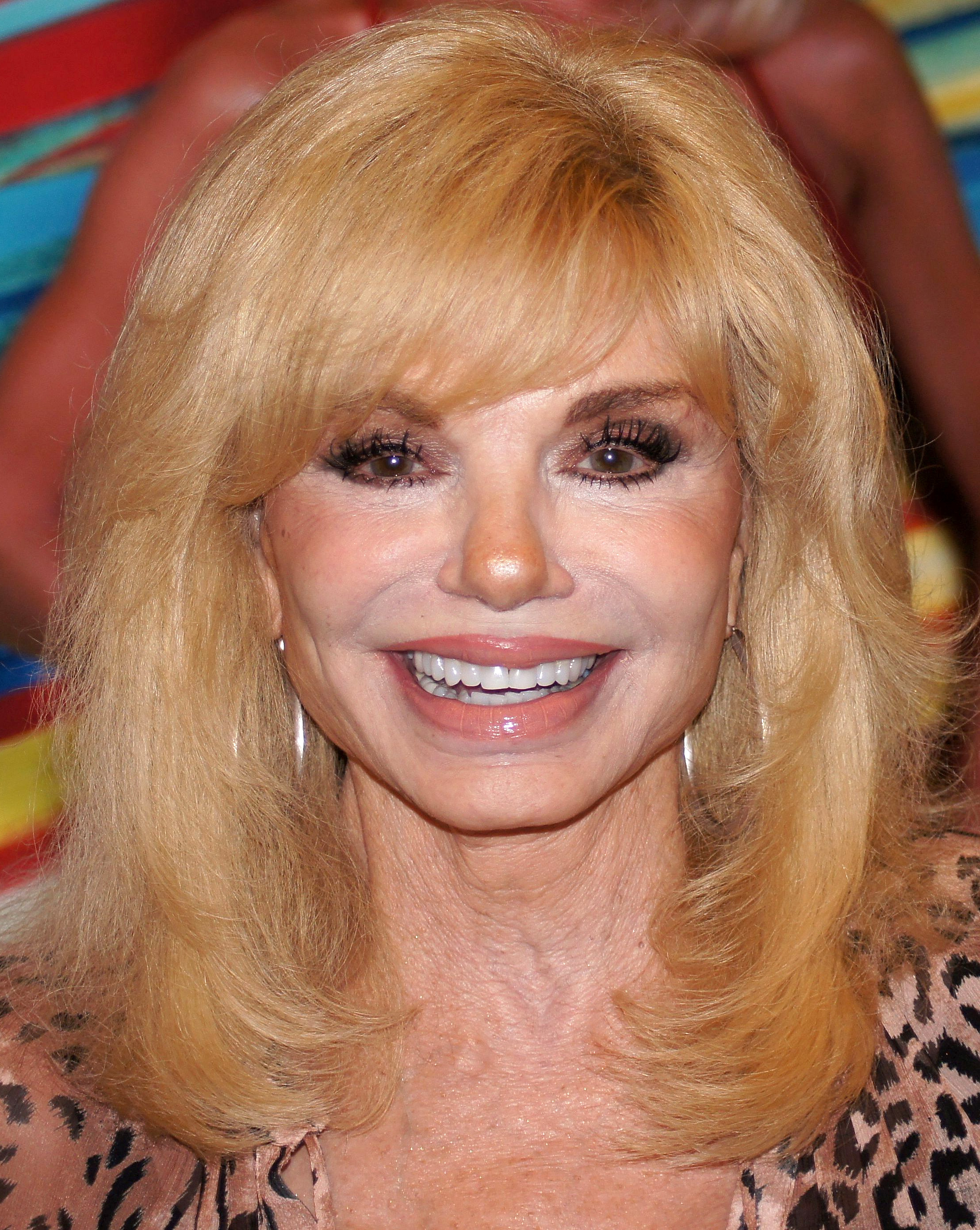
Loni Anderson

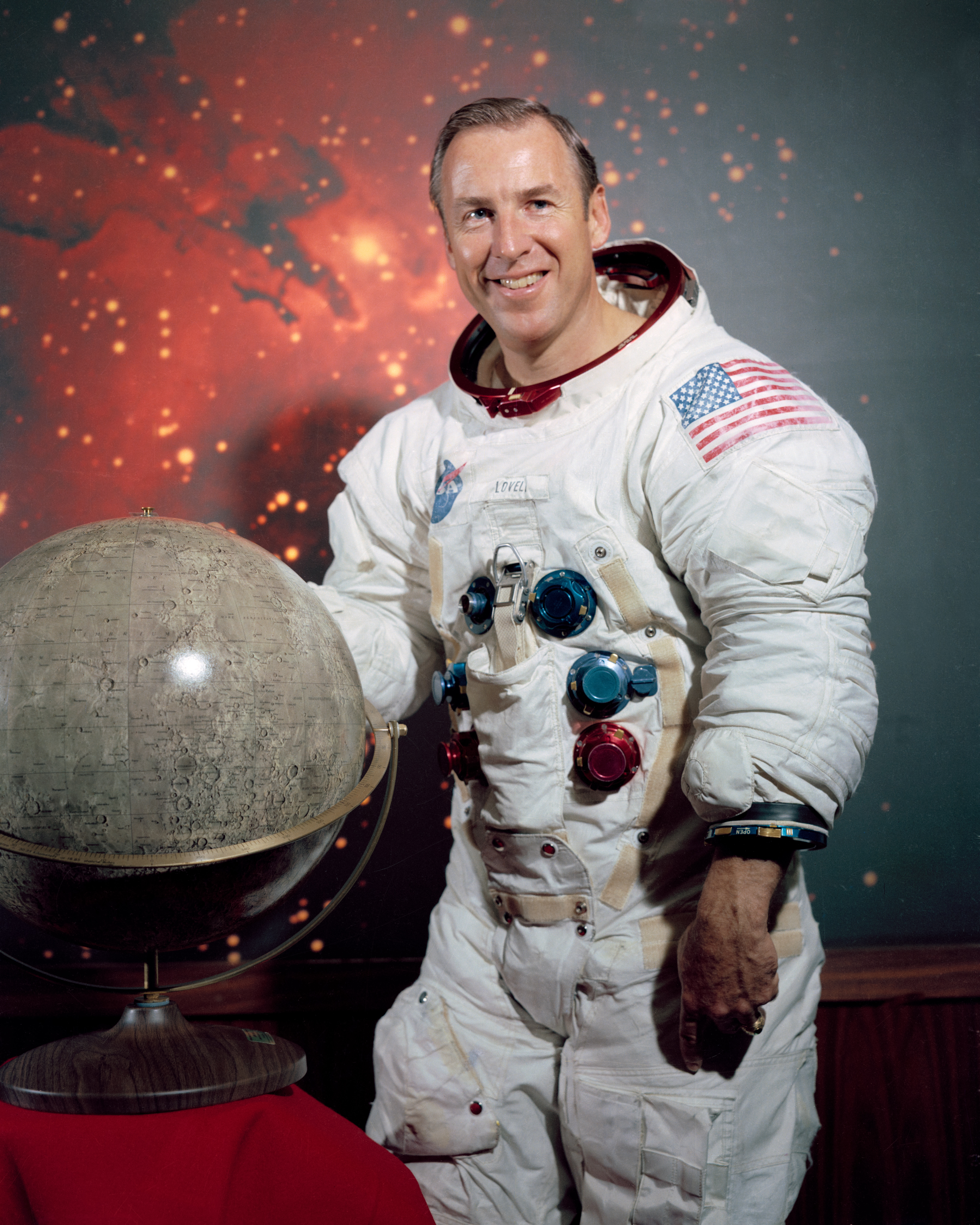
Jim Lovell

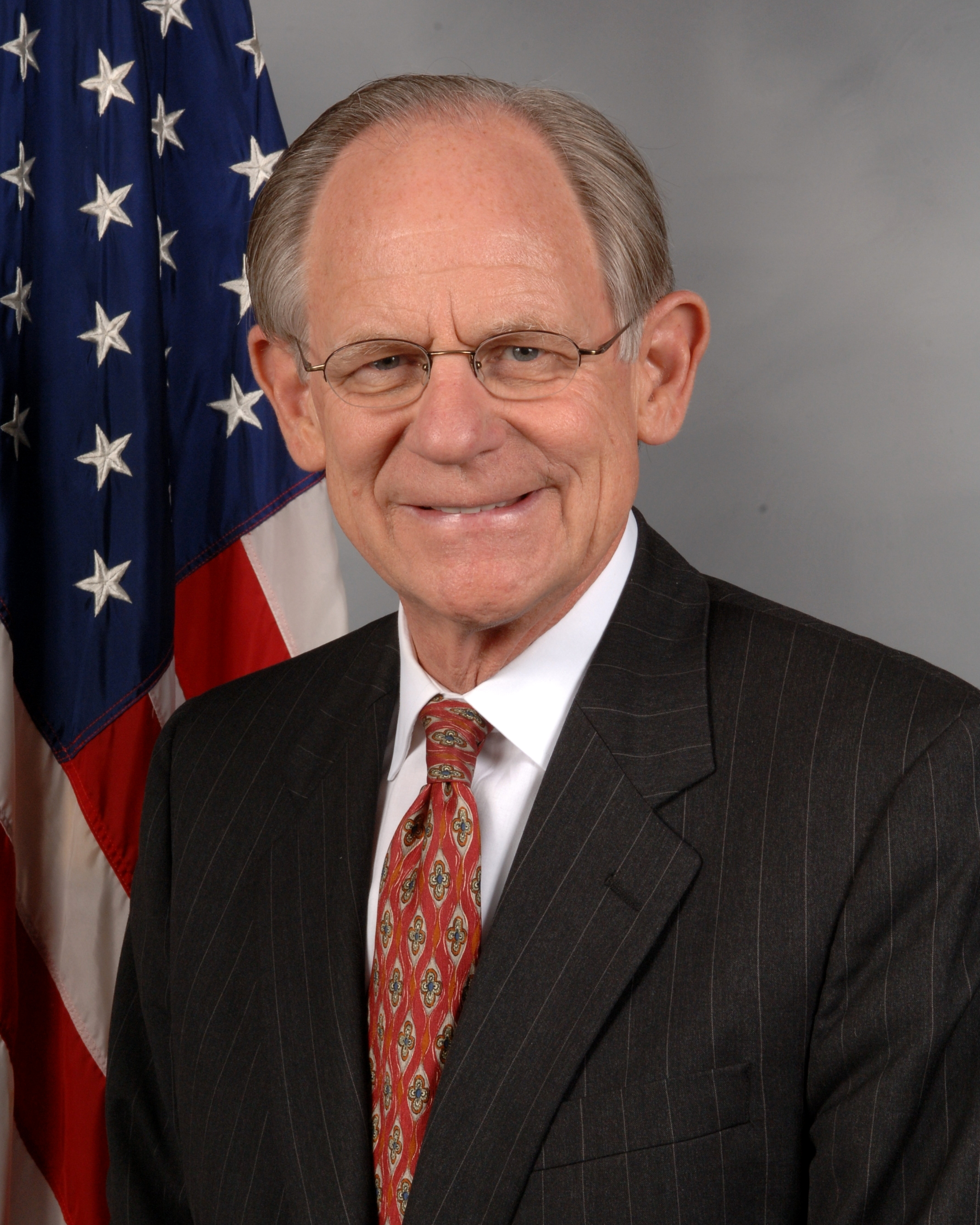
Mike Castle

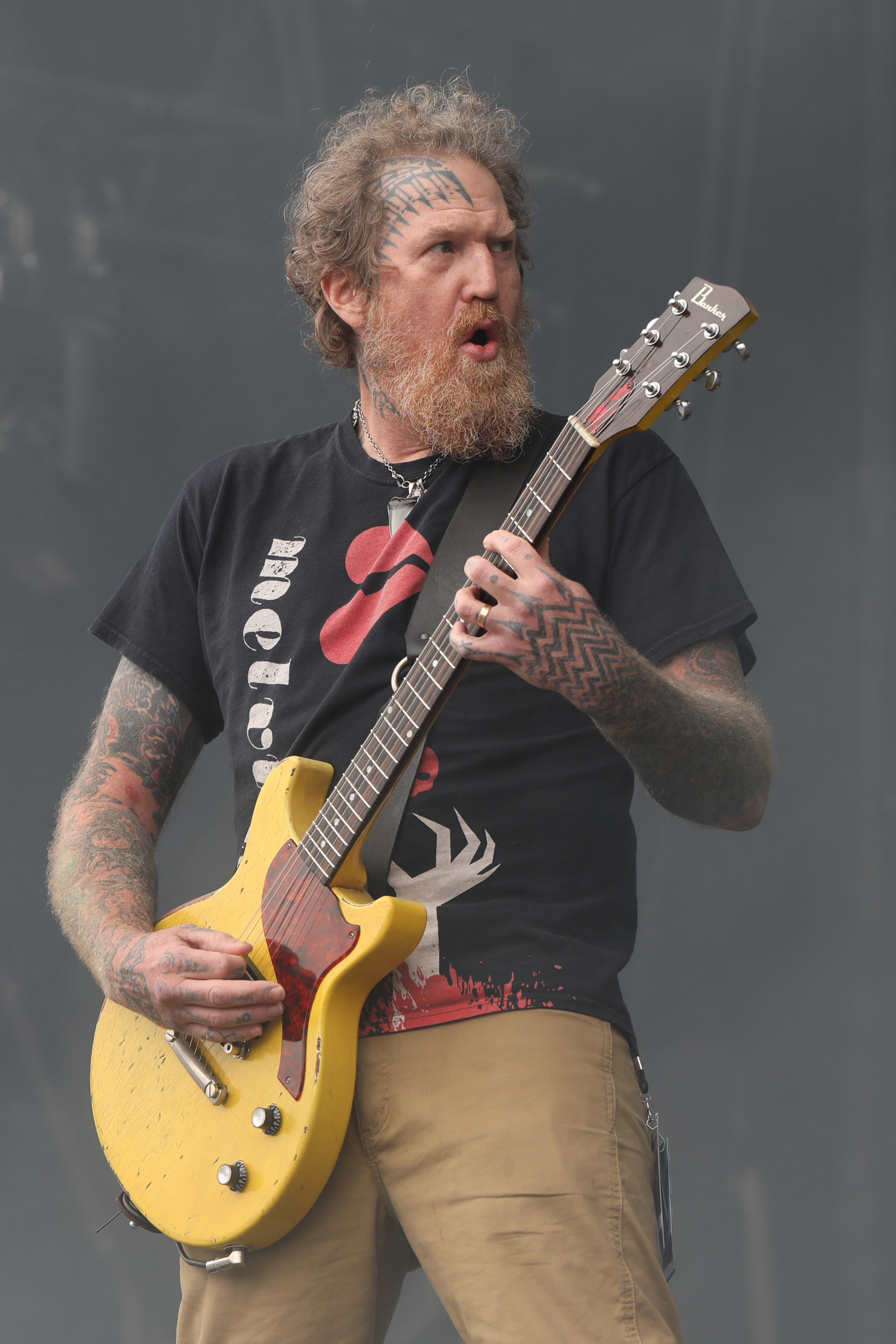
Brent Hinds

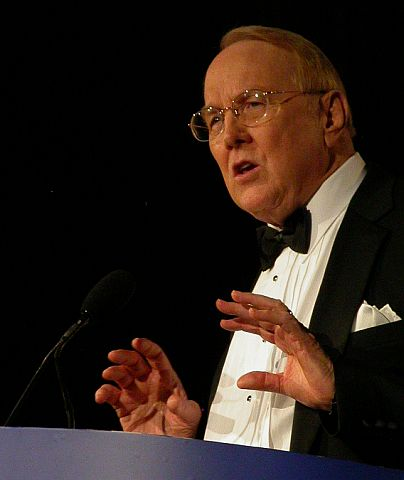
James Dobson

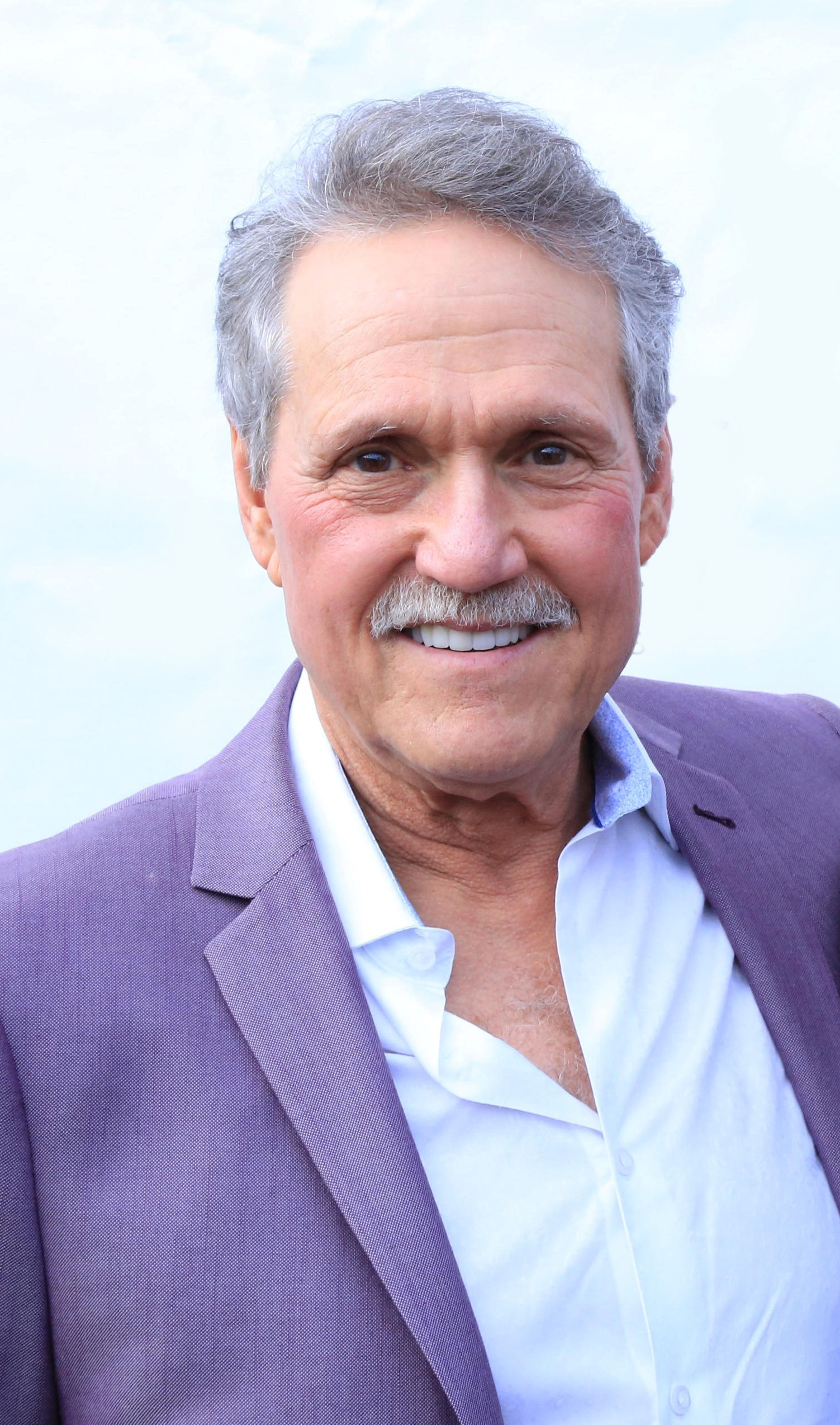
Joel Sill

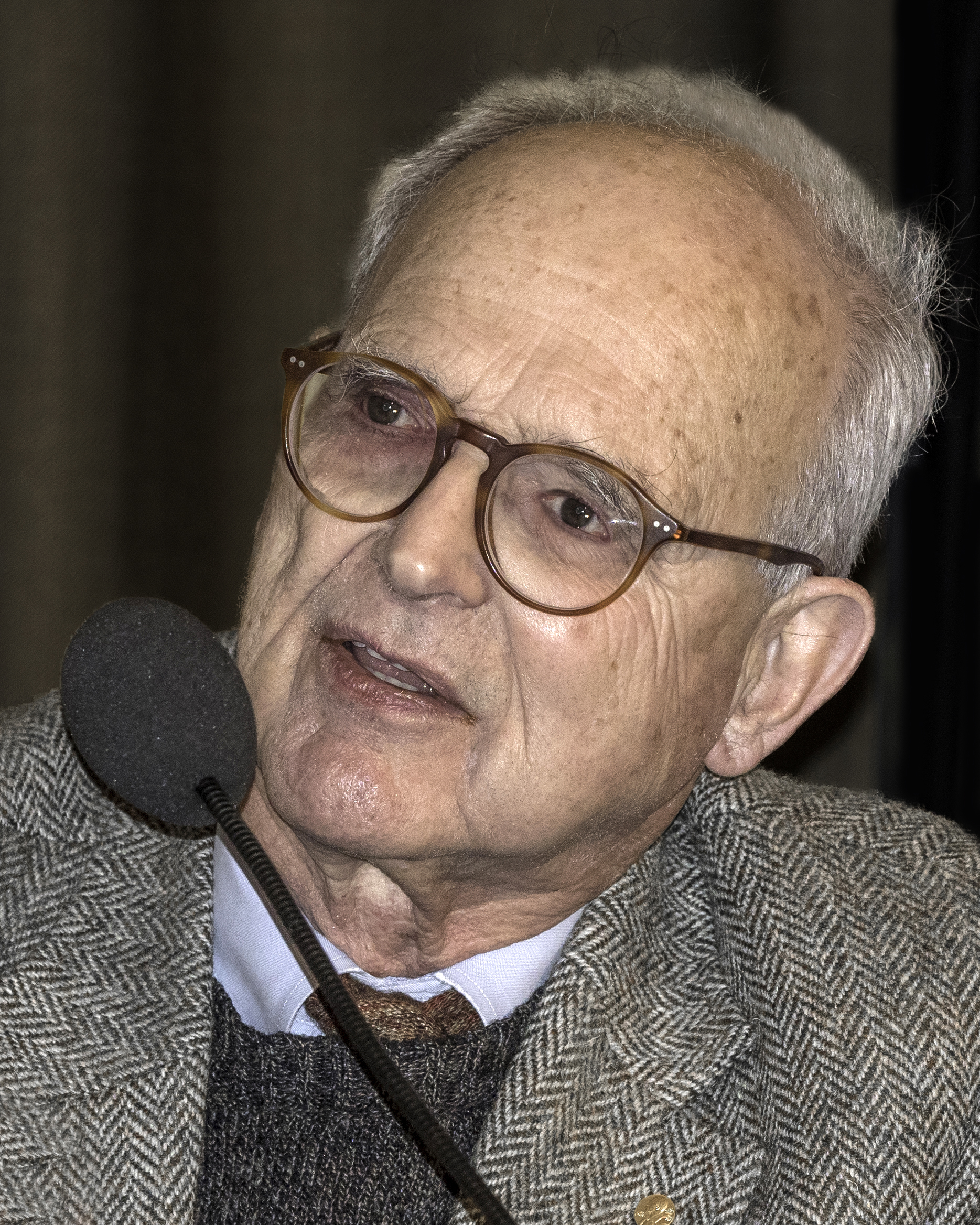
Rainer Weiss

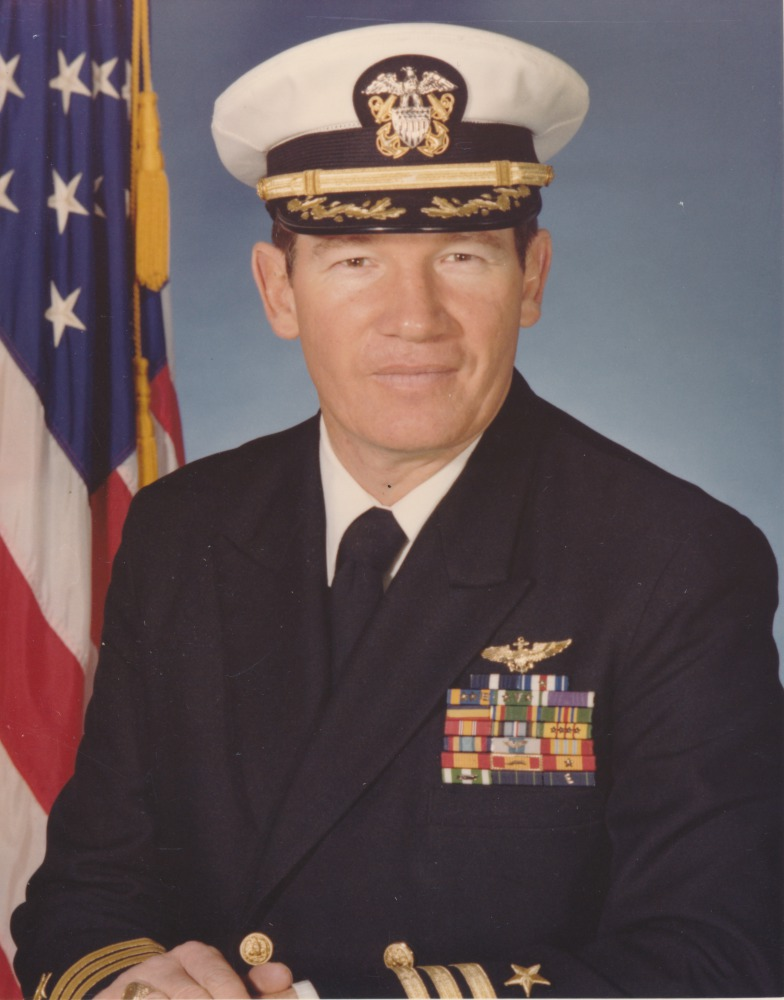
Duke Cunningham

- August 1
  - Rahaman Ali, 82, boxer (b. 1943)
  - Jonathan Kaplan, 77, film and television director (The Accused, Over the Edge, ER) (b. 1947)
  - Jeannie Seely, 85, singer ("Don't Touch Me", "I'll Love You More (Than You Need)", "Wish I Didn't Have to Miss You") (b. 1940)
- August 2
  - Walker Evans, 86, race car driver, Baja 1000 winner (b. 1938)
  - Kelley Mack, 33, actress (The Walking Dead, 9-1-1, Chicago Med) (b. 1992)
  - Howie Tee, 61, English-born DJ and record producer (b. 1964)
- August 3
  - Satyapal Anand, 94, Indian-born poet and writer (b. 1931)
  - Loni Anderson, 79, actress (WKRP in Cincinnati, All Dogs Go to Heaven, A Night at the Roxbury) (b. 1945)
- August 4
  - Billy Howton, 95, football player (Green Bay Packers, Cleveland Browns, Dallas Cowboys) (b. 1930)
  - Jane Morgan, 101, singer ("Fascination") and actress (b. 1924)
- August 5
  - Minnie Lou Bradley, 93, rancher and cattlewoman (b. 1931)
  - Nancy King, 85, jazz singer (b. 1940)
  - Leonard Lopate, 84, radio host (WNYC) (b. 1940)
  - Morton Meyerson, 87, computer industry executive, president of Electronic Data Systems (1966–1971) (b. 1938)
- August 6
  - Jon Miyahara, 83, actor (Superstore) (b. 1941)
  - Eddie Palmieri, 88, jazz pianist, composer and bandleader (b. 1936)
  - Lionel Taylor, 89, football player (Denver Broncos, Houston Oilers) and coach (Pittsburgh Steelers) (b. 1935)
  - Lloyd A. Williams, 80, community leader (b. 1945)
- August 7
  - Jim Lovell, 97, astronaut (Gemini 12, Apollo 8, Apollo 13) (b. 1928)
  - James Vrentas, 89, chemical engineer (b. 1936)
- August 8
  - Grass Wonder, 30, Thoroughbred racehorse and sire (b. 1995)
  - William H. Webster, 101, jurist and intelligence officer, director of the FBI (1978–1987) and CIA (1987–1991), chairman of the HSAC (2005–2020) (b. 1924)
- August 9
  - Mark M. Baker, 77, defense attorney (b. 1947)
  - Dale Webster, 76, surfer (b. 1948)
- August 10
  - David Ketchum, 97, actor (Get Smart, The Mary Tyler Moore Show, Camp Runamuck) (b. 1928)
  - Michael Klick, 77, television producer (24, Homeland, Love & Death), Emmy winner (2006, 2012) (b. 1948)
  - Bobby Whitlock, 77, singer-songwriter and keyboardist (Derek and the Dominos) (b. 1948)
- August 11
  - Chuck Girard, 81, Christian rock singer and pianist (Love Song, The Castells, The Hondells) (b. 1943)
  - Sheila Jordan, 96, jazz singer (b. 1928)
  - Danielle Spencer, 60, actress (What's Happening!!) (b. 1965)
- August 12
  - Ronnie Rondell Jr., 88, stuntman (Wish You Were Here, Speed, Lethal Weapon) (b. 1937)
  - Richard Tarrant, 83, politician and businessman (b. 1942)
  - David Thieme, 83, industrial designer and motor racing sponsor (Lotus) (b. 1942)
- August 13
  - Michael Sloan, 78, television writer and producer (The Equalizer, B. J. and the Bear, Quincy, M.E.) (b. 1946)
  - Gerry Spence, 96, attorney (Karen Silkwood, Imelda Marcos, Randy Weaver) (b. 1929)
  - Art Wander, 98, television and radio broadcaster (b. 1927)
- August 14
  - Jackie Bezos, 78, philanthropist, co-founder of the Bezos Family Foundation (b. 1946)
  - Mike Castle, 86, politician, lieutenant governor (1981–1985) and governor (1985–1992) of Delaware, member of the U.S. House of Representatives (1993–2011) (b. 1939)
  - Donald M. McPherson, 103, Navy fighter ace (b. 1922)
- August 15
  - Greg Iles, 65, novelist (The Quiet Game, 24 Hours, The Footprints of God) (b. 1960)
- August 16
  - Ted Grossman, 83, Miami radio host (Night Train, WLRN) (b. 1942)
  - Larry Jones, 82, basketball player (Philadelphia 76ers, Denver Rockets) (b. 1942)
  - Joe Reece Salter, 82, politician, member (1986–2008) and speaker (2004–2008) of the Louisiana House of Representatives (b. 1943)
  - Dan Tana, 90, Serbian-born restaurateur, actor and football administrator (Los Angeles Toros, Red Star Belgrade) (b. 1935)
  - Berel Wein, 91, rabbi and writer (Faith and Fate) (b. 1934)
  - Jules Witcover, 98, journalist and political columnist (b. 1927)
- August 17
  - Humberto Calzada, 81, Cuban-born artist (b. 1944)
  - Joe Caroff, 103, graphic designer (b. 1921)
  - Gayle Cook, 91, medical manufacturing executive, co-founder of the Cook Group (b. 1934)
  - Elon Dershowitz, 64, film producer (Fallen, Reversal of Fortune, The Whole Truth) (b. 1961)
  - Joe Hickerson, 89, folk singer (b. 1935)
  - John Joannopoulos, 78, physicist (b. 1947)
- August 18
  - Vivian Ayers Allen, 102, poet and activist (b. 1923)
  - Bill Williams, 91, television journalist (WBIR-TV) (b. 1934)
- August 19
  - Michael Antunes, 85, saxophonist (b. 1940)
  - Michael C. J. Putnam, 91, classicist (b. 1933)
- August 20
  - Frank Caprio, 88, judge, Chief Judge of the Municipal Court of Providence (1985–2023) (b. 1936)
  - Brent Hinds, 51, heavy metal musician (Mastodon, Giraffe Tongue Orchestra) and songwriter ("Colony of Birchmen"), Grammy winner (2018) (b. 1974)
  - Scott Spiegel, 67, film screenwriter (Evil Dead II) and producer (Hostel) (b. 1957)
  - Humpy Wheeler, 86, motorsports promoter (NASCAR) (b. 1938)
- August 21
  - Gordon Bowker, 82, businessman, co-founder of Starbucks (b. 1942)
  - James Dobson, 89, evangelical Christian psychologist, founder of Focus on the Family (b. 1936)
- August 22
  - Forrest Lucas, 83, businessman, founder of Lucas Oil (b. 1942)
- August 23
  - Jerry Adler, 96, actor (The Sopranos, The Good Wife, Rescue Me) (b. 1929)
  - Joel Sill, 87, music supervisor (Easy Rider, Flashdance, Forrest Gump) (b. 1946)
  - Maurice Tempelsman, 95, Belgian-born businessman and diamond merchant (b. 1929)
- August 24
  - Floyd Levine, 93, actor (Death Wish, Dog Day Afternoon, Night Shift) (b. 1932)
  - Ken Waller, 63, politician, member of the Missouri House of Representatives (since 2023) (b. 1961/1962) (death announced on this date)
- August 25
  - Jim Murray, 87, football executive, general manager of the Philadelphia Eagles (b. 1937/1938)
  - Frank Price, 95, television producer (The Virginian) and film studio executive (Universal Pictures, Columbia Pictures) (b. 1930)
  - Rainer Weiss, 92, German-born physicist, Nobel Prize laureate (2017) (b. 1932)
- August 26
  - Tim Armstead, 60, politician, Chief Justice of the West Virginia Supreme Court of Appeals (since 2018) (b. 1965)
  - Sarah Minear, 84, politician, member of the West Virginia Senate (1987–2007) (b. 1941)
- August 27
  - Duke Cunningham, 83, politician and fighter ace, member of the House of Representatives (1991–2005) (b. 1941)
- August 28
  - Randy Boone, 83, actor (The Virginian) (b. 1942)
  - Gary Burbank, 84, radio host (b. 1941)
- August 29
  - Charles Bierbauer, 83, broadcast journalist (CNN) and academic (b. 1942)
  - Kim Hughes, 73, basketball player (Olimpia Milano, New York Jets) and coach (Portland Trail Blazers) (b. 1952)
- August 30
  - Lee Roy Jordan, 84, football player (Dallas Cowboys) (b. 1941)
  - Mark Knoller, 73, journalist (CBS News) (b. 1952)
  - Carol Saline, 86, journalist and writer (b. 1939)
- August 31
  - William Diamond, 80, politician, member of the Maine Senate (1982–1986, 2004–2012, 2014–2022) (b. 1945)
  - Chelsea Quinn Yarbro, 82, writer (b. 1942)

== September ==
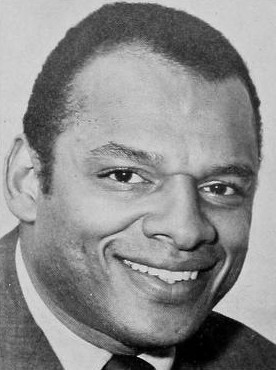
George Raveling

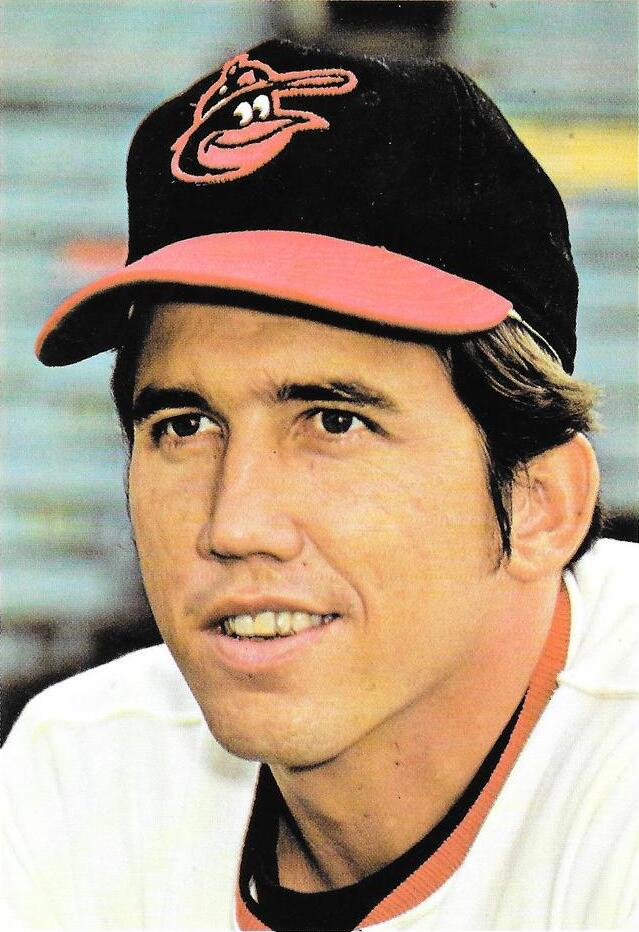
Davey Johnson

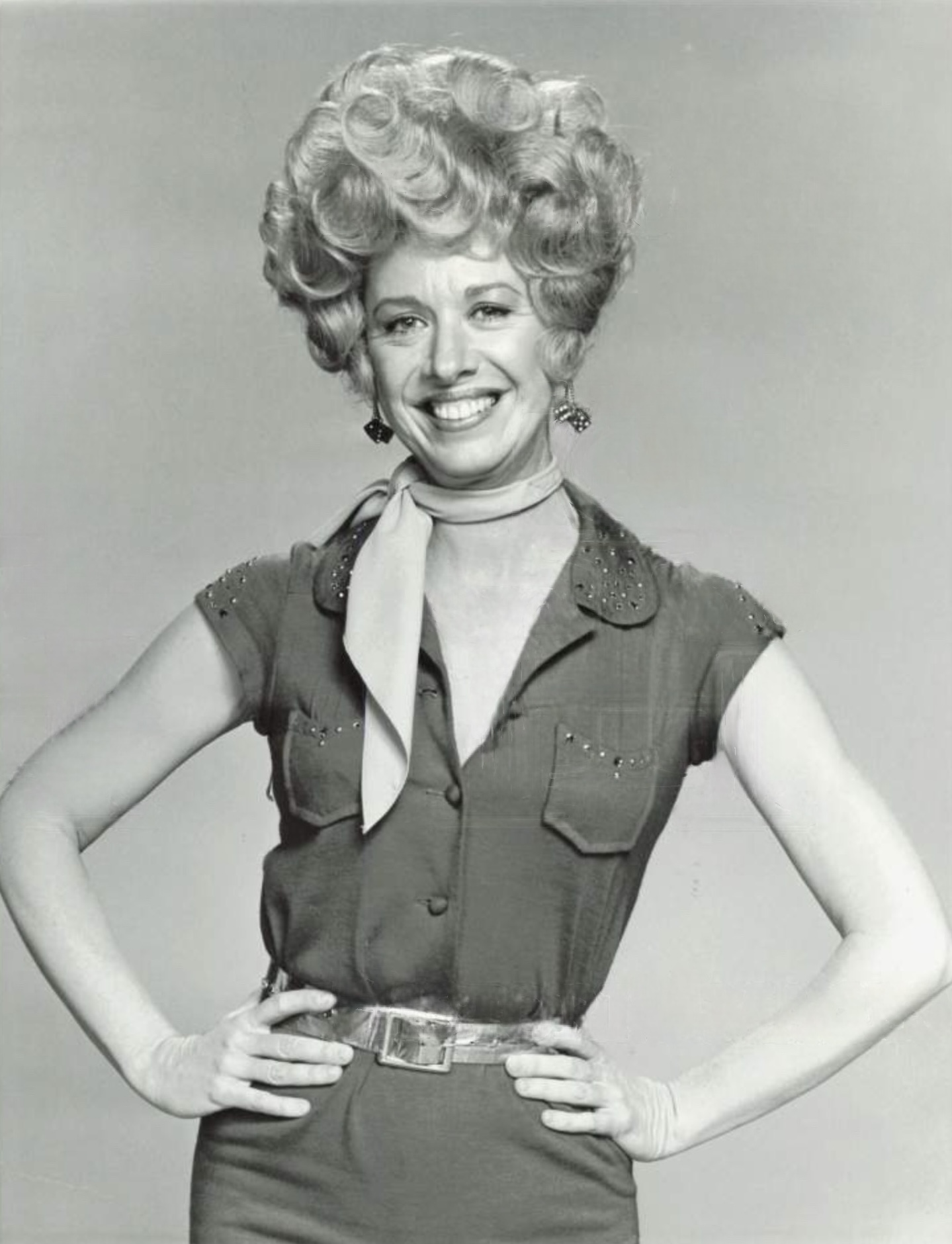
Polly Holliday

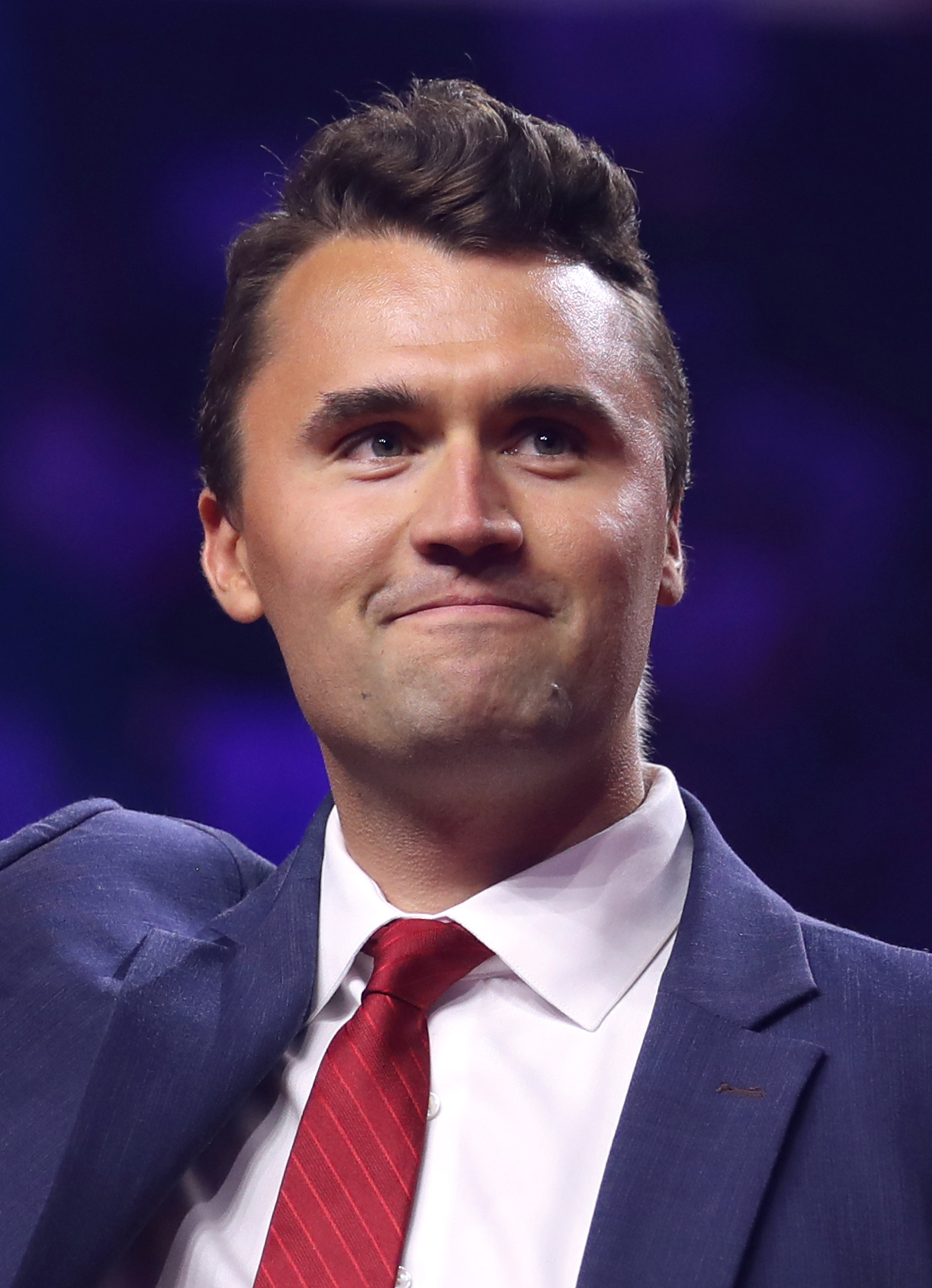
Charlie Kirk

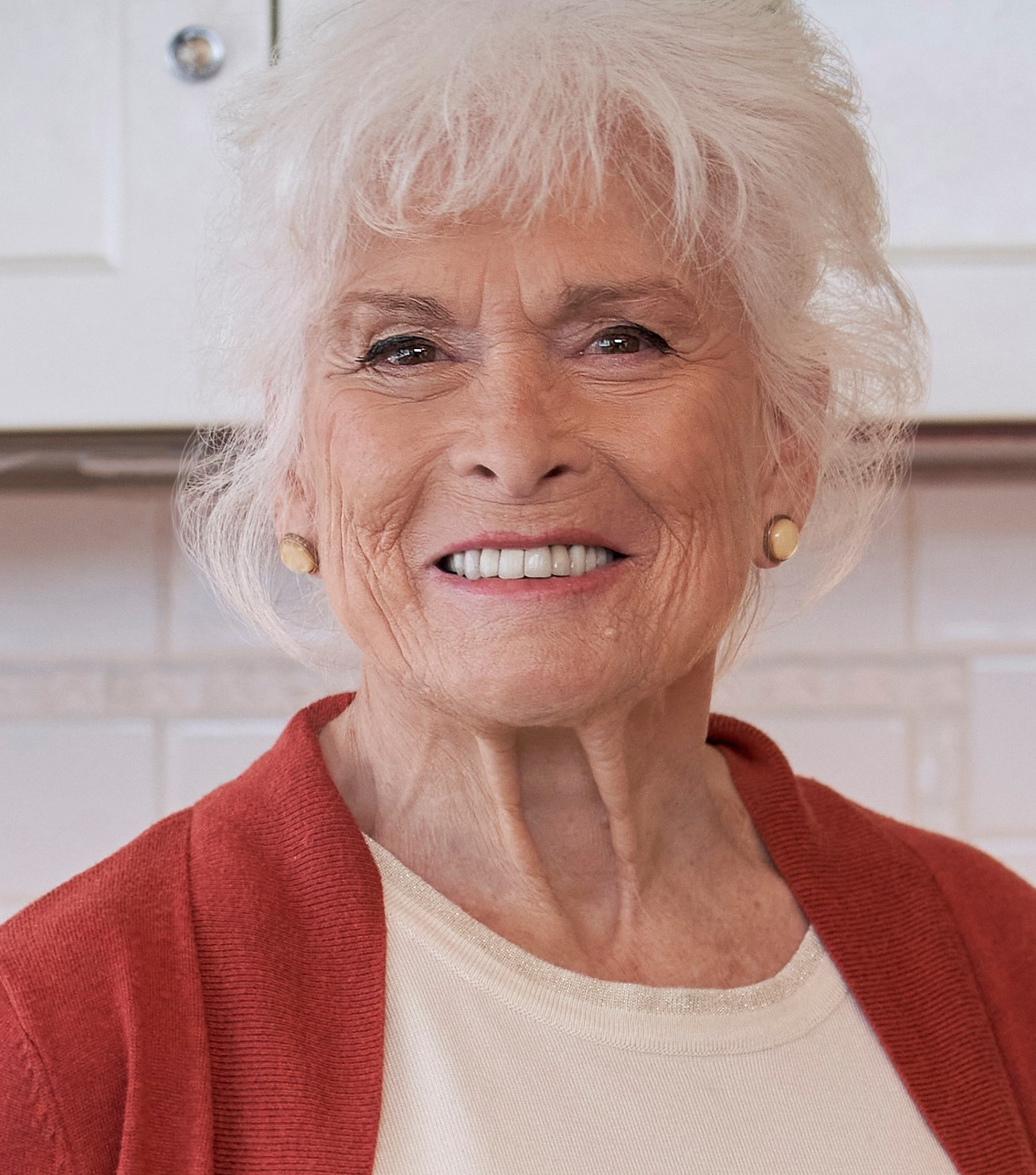
Paula Shaw

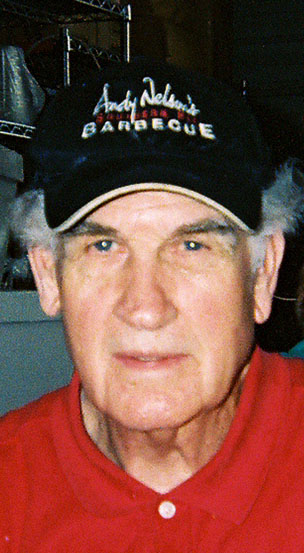
Andy Nelson

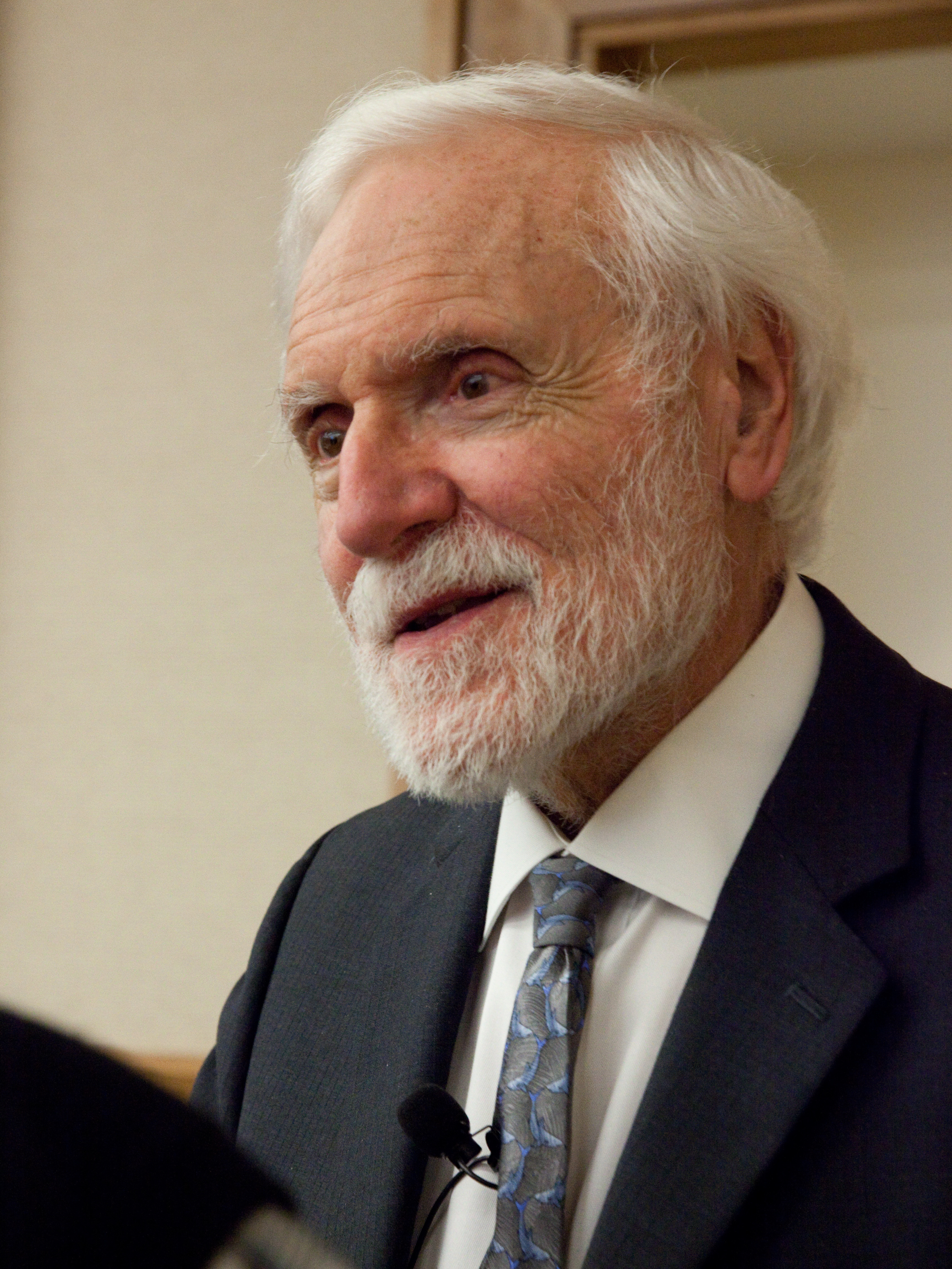
Drummond Rennie

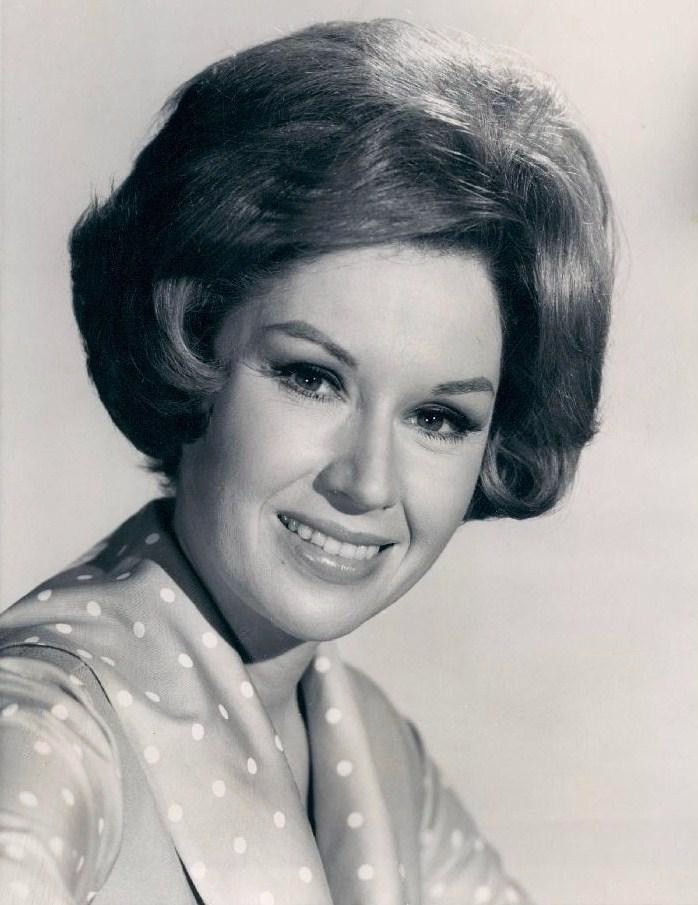
Pat Crowley

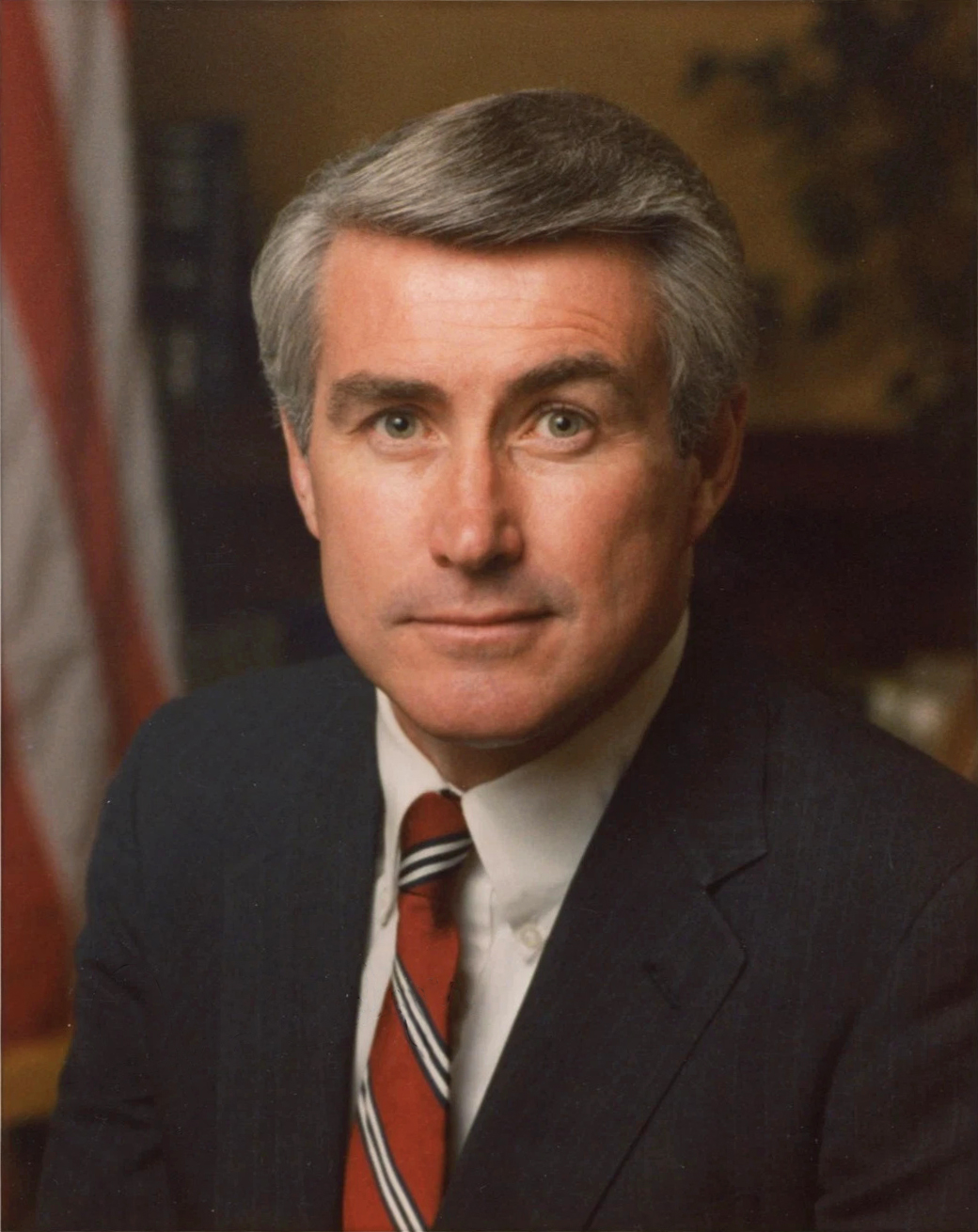
Jim Edgar

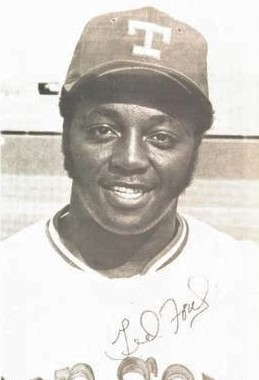
Ted Ford

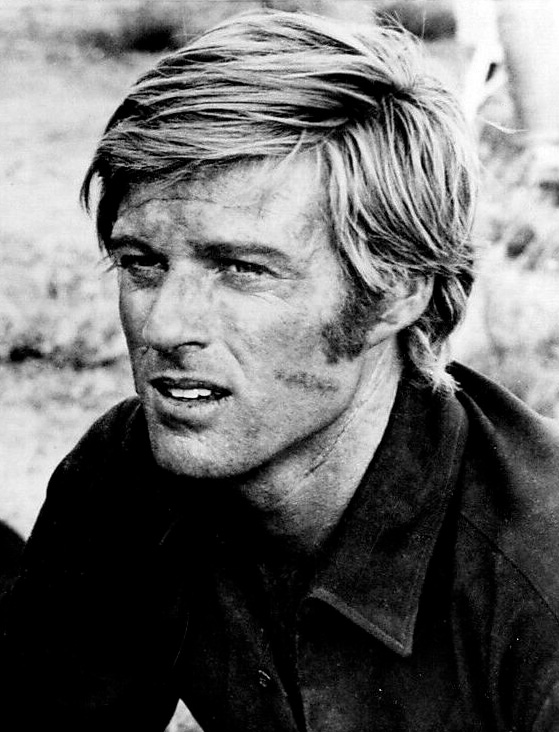
Robert Redford

Leo Hindery

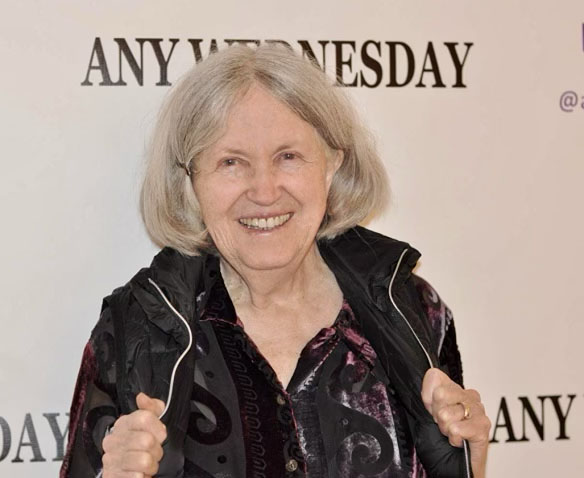
Allie Light

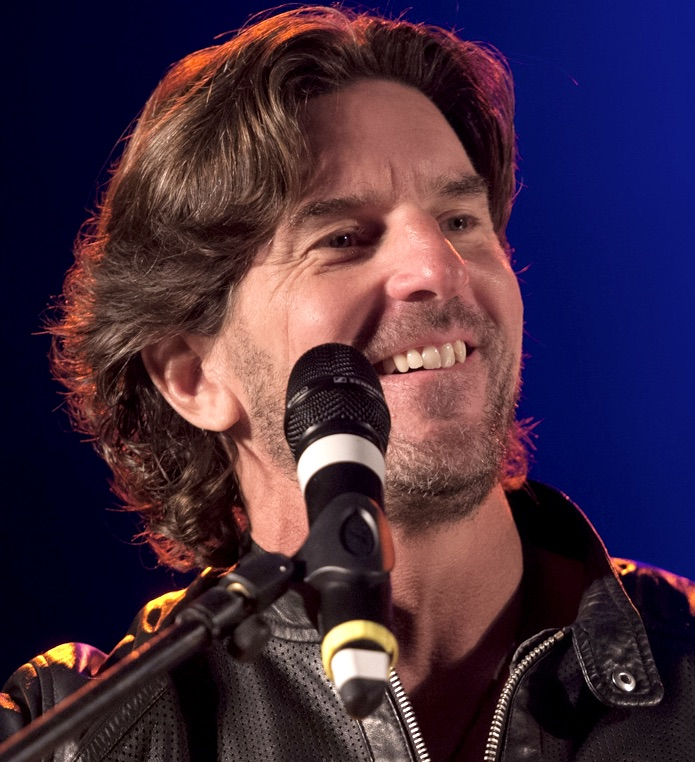
Brett James

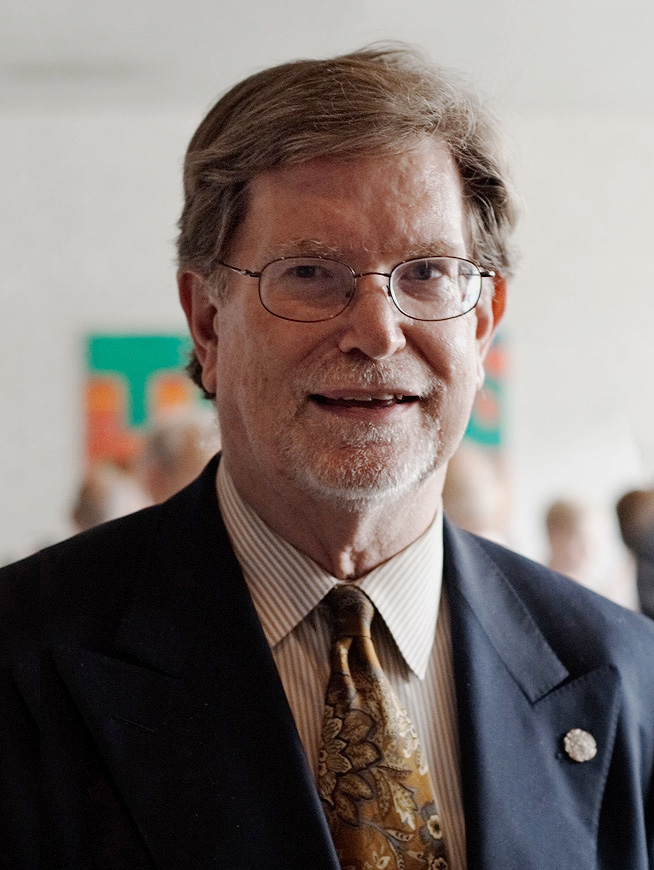
George Smoot

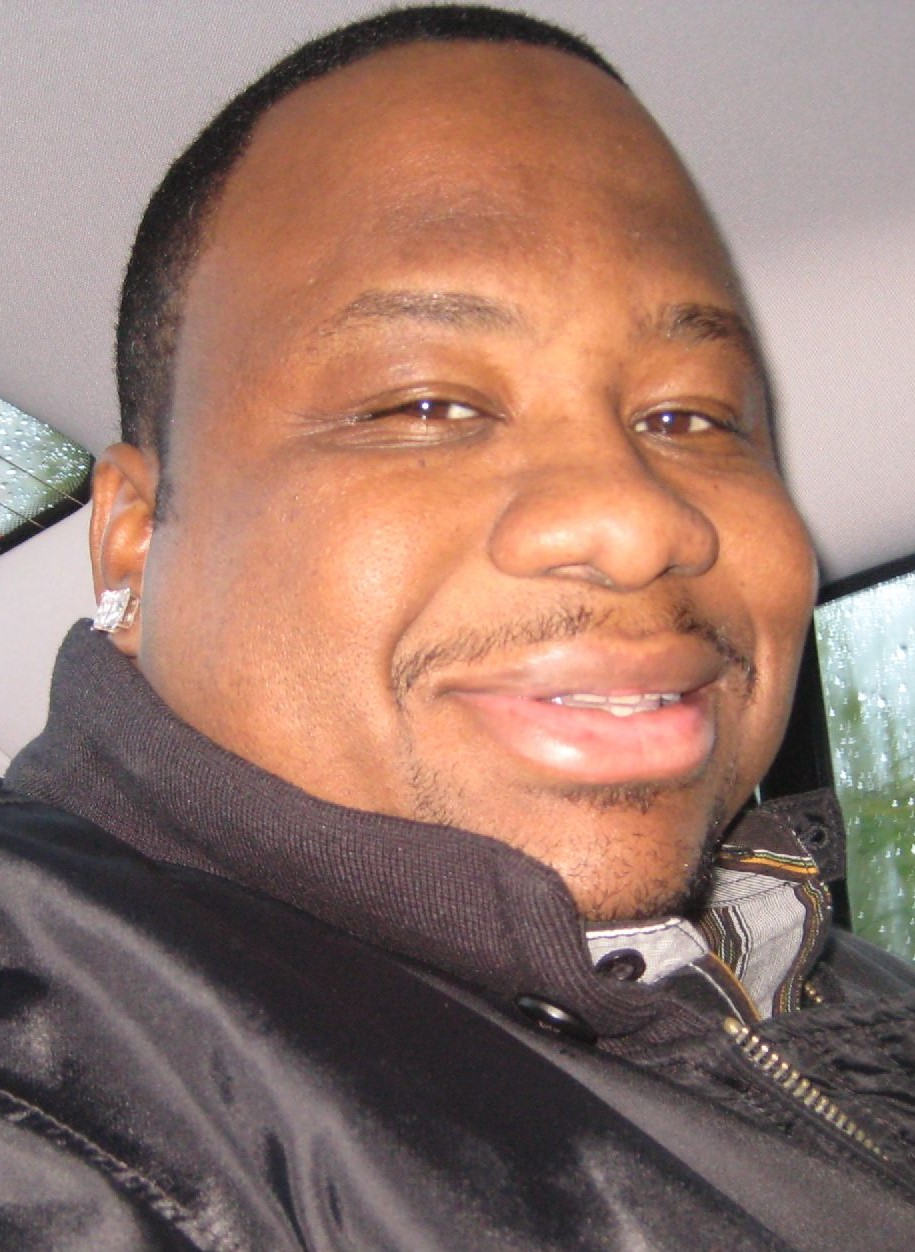
Ron Carroll

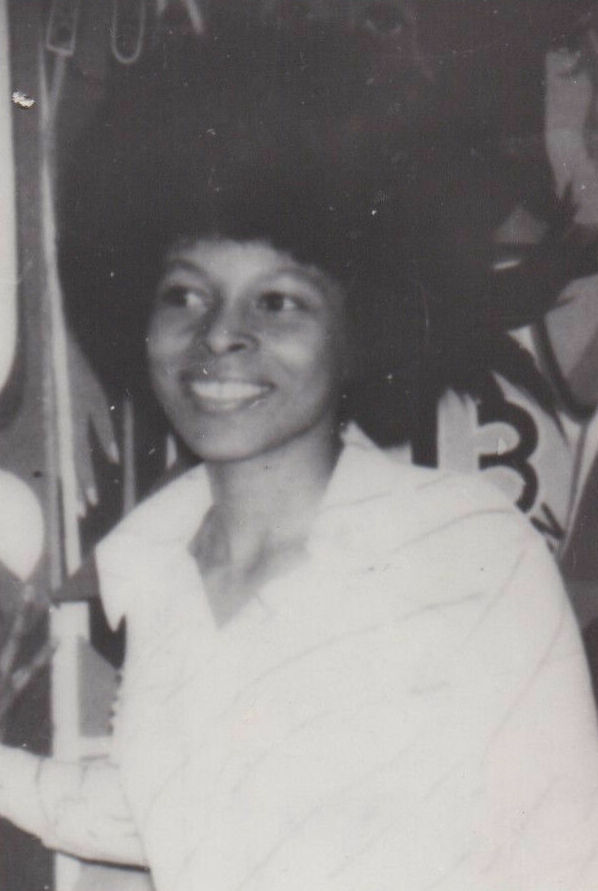
Assata Shakur

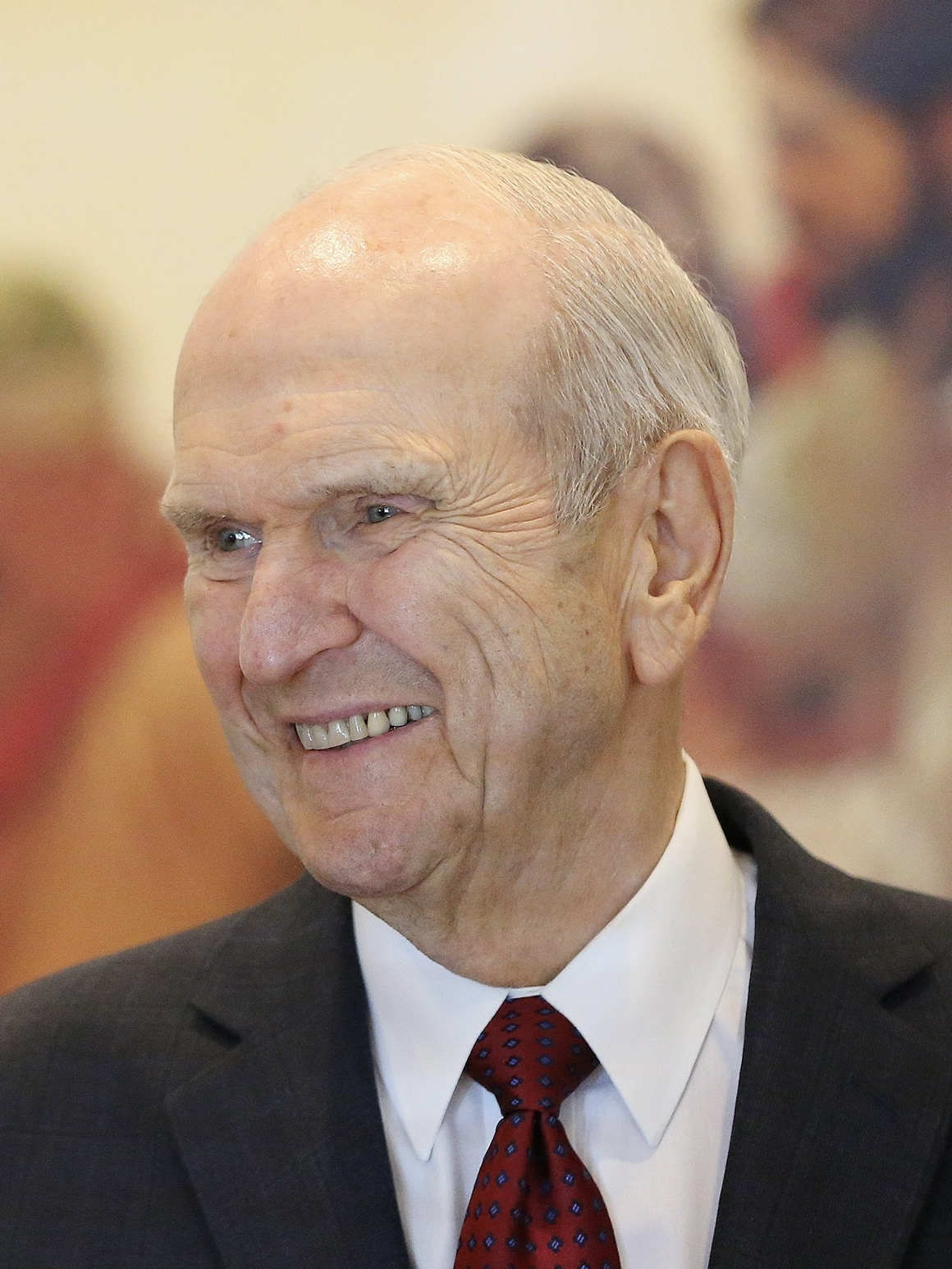
Russell M. Nelson

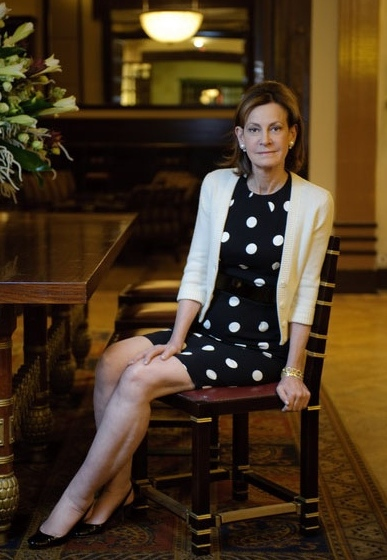
Lally Weymouth

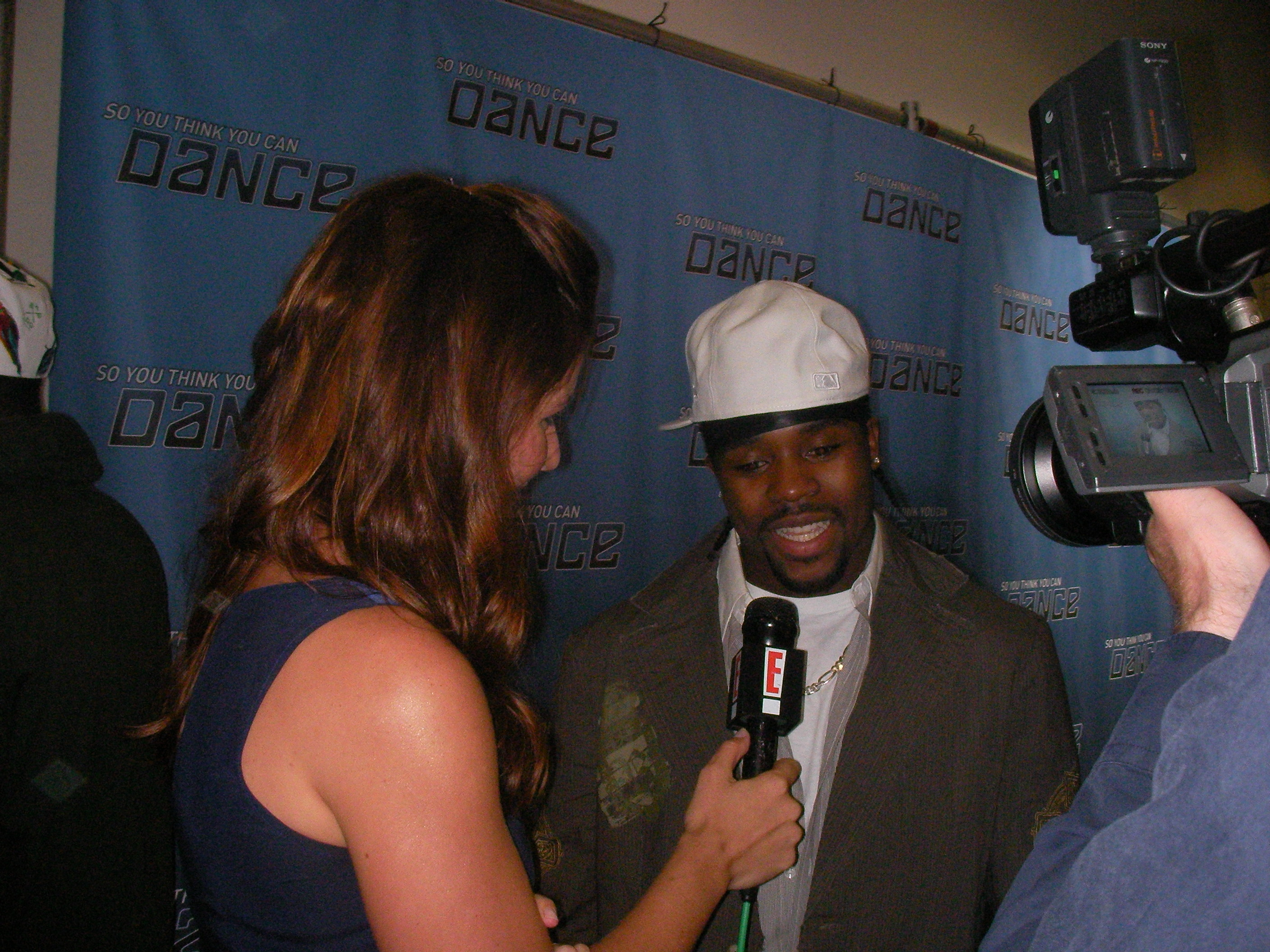
Joshua Allen

- September 1
  - Tom Davin, 67, food industry executive (b. 1957)
  - Jean Havlish, 89, baseball player (Fort Wayne Daisies) (b. 1935)
  - Jodie Laubenberg, 68, politician, member of the Texas House of Representatives (2003–2019) (b. 1957)
  - Don Morrison, 75, football player (New Orleans Saints, Baltimore Colts, Detroit Lions) (b. 1949)
  - Mitch Needelman, 72, politician, member of the Florida House of Representatives (2000–2008) (b. 1952)
  - Nick Rassas, 81, football player (Atlanta Falcons) (b. 1944)
  - George Raveling, 88, Hall of Fame basketball coach (Villanova Wildcats, Washington State Cougars) and sports industry executive (Nike) (b. 1937)
  - Scott Spiegel, 67, screenwriter (Evil Dead II), director (Intruder) and actor (Within the Woods) (b. 1957)
  - James Van Horne, 90, economist (b. 1935)
  - Cheryl Waters, 78, actress (Macon County Line, Girls in Chains, Ride the Hot Wind) (b. 1947)
- September 2
  - Harvey Aronson, 96, journalist (Newsday) (b. 1929)
  - Phil Barkdoll, 87, racing driver (NASCAR Winston Cup Series) and team owner (b. 1937)
  - Dan Darragh, 78, football player (Buffalo Bills) (b. 1946)
  - Larry Glueck, 83, football player (Villanova Wildcats, Chicago Bears) (b. 1941)
  - Patrick Hemingway, 97, author and safari guide (b. 1928)
  - Arthur S. Reber, 85, psychologist (b. 1940)
  - Gary Stubblefield, 74, politician, member of the Arkansas House of Representatives (2011–2013) and Senate (since 2013) (b. 1951)
- September 3
  - Whitey Bell, 92, basketball player (New York Knicks) (b. 1932)
  - Doris Cook, 94, baseball player (Kalamazoo Lassies, Springfield Sallies, South Bend Blue Sox) (b. 1931)
  - Rosalyn Drexler, 98, pop artist (b. 1926)
  - Robert Grosvenor, 88, sculptor, co-founder of Park Place Gallery (b. 1937)
  - Stephen Mendillo, 84, actor (Slap Shot, Broadcast News, Lone Star) (b. 1940)
  - Larry Robinson, 75, politician, member of the North Dakota Senate (1989–2020) (b. 1949)
  - Rolling Ray, 28, American media personality (b. 1996)
- September 4
  - Baddiewinkle, 97, internet personality (b. 1928)
  - Ned Chiodo, 83, American politician, member of the Iowa House of Representatives (1977–1985) (b. 1942)
  - William A. Farley, 87, hair stylist (Goodfellas, The Exorcist, Ransom) (b. 1938)
  - Darleane C. Hoffman, 98, nuclear chemist (b. 1926)
  - Robert Jay Lifton, 99, psychiatrist and author (b. 1926)
  - Ted Mann, 72, television writer and producer (NYPD Blue, Deadwood, Homeland) (b. 1952)
  - Joseph McNeil, 83, USAF officer and activist (b. 1942)
  - Neil Summers, 81, English-born actor (Dick Tracy, RoboCop, The Shawshank Redemption) and stuntman (b. 1944)
  - Robby Turner, 63, pedal steel guitarist (b. 1962/1963)
- September 5
  - George Basalla, 97, historian (b. 1928)
  - Maxine Clair, 86, novelist and poet (b. 1939)
  - Merwin Coad, 100, minister and politician, member of the U.S. House of Representatives (1957–1963) (b. 1924)
  - Susan Firer, 76, poet (b. 1948)
  - Davey Johnson, 82, baseball player (Baltimore Orioles, Atlanta Braves) and manager (New York Mets) (b. 1943)
  - G. A. Moore, 86, football player (North Texas Mean Green) and coach (b. 1938/1939)
  - Mark Volman, 78, rock singer (The Turtles, Flo & Eddie) (b. 1947)
- September 6
  - Duane Ankney, 79, politician, member of the Montana House of Representatives (2007–2015) and Senate (2015–2023) (b. 1946)
  - David Baltimore, 87, biologist, Nobel Prize laureate (1975) (b. 1938)
  - Ed Blakely, 87, urban planner and academic (b. 1938)
  - Bill Davis, 74, racing team owner (Bill Davis Racing) (b. 1951)
  - Gary Faigin, 74, realist painter (b. 1950)
  - John R. Gaydos, 82, Roman Catholic prelate, bishop of Jefferson City, Missouri (1997–2017) (b. 1943)
  - Walt Helmick, 81, politician, member of the West Virginia Senate (1994–2017) and West Virginia Commissioner of Agriculture (2013–2017) (b. 1944)
  - Willie Parker, 80, football player (Houston Oilers, Houston Texans/Shreveport Steamer) (b. 1945)
  - Brian Cantwell Smith, 74, Canadian-born philosopher (b. 1950)
- September 7
  - John Burton, 92, politician, chair of the California Democratic Party (1973–1974, 2009–2017) and member of the House of Representatives (1974–1983) (b. 1932)
  - Don Cox, 85, politician, member of the Washington House of Representatives (2009–2010) (b. 1939)
  - Brian Dayett, 68, baseball player (Chicago Cubs, New York Yankees) (b. 1957)
  - Marilyn Diamond, 81, author and detoxification promoter (b. 1944)
  - Jaka, 39, professional wrestler (EVOLVE, Beyond Wrestling) (b. 1986)
  - Jim Marshall, 94, baseball player and manager (Chicago Cubs, New York Mets, Chunichi Dragons) (b. 1931)
  - Ning Pan, 72, Chinese-born born engineer (b. 1953)
  - John Penton, 100, motorcycle racer (b. 1925)
- September 8
  - Joseph Dube, 81, weightlifter, Olympic bronze medalist (1968) (b. 1944)
  - Tom Patton, 90, baseball player (Baltimore Orioles) (b. 1935)
  - Salli Sachse, 82, actress (Beach Blanket Bingo, The Trip, Wild in the Streets) (b. 1943)
- September 9
  - Paul Baccaglini, 41, American-born Italian football executive and television personality (Le Iene), president of Palermo (2017) (b. 1984)
  - Robert K. Corbin, 96, politician, attorney general of Arizona (1979–1991) and president of the National Rifle Association of America (1992–1993) (b. 1928)
  - Jim Dickson, 87, baseball player (Houston Colt .45s, Cincinnati Reds, Kansas City Athletics) (b. 1938)
  - Michael Dryhurst, 87, British-born film producer (Excalibur, Hudson Hawk, Never Say Never Again) (b. 1938)
  - Polly Holliday, 88, actress (Alice, Gremlins, Mrs. Doubtfire) (b. 1937)
  - Stephen P. Long, 75, British-born plant physiologist (b. 1950)
  - Kenneth Margerison, 79, historian (b. 1946)
  - Robert D. Maurer, 101, physicist, developer of optical fiber (b. 1924)
  - Andrew R. Neureuther, 84, electrical engineer (b. 1941)
  - Mark Norell, 68, vertebrate paleontologist (b. 1957)
  - Alfred Rieber, 94, historian (b. 1931)
- September 10
  - Bruce DuMont, 81, radio talk show host (Beyond the Beltway) and television broadcaster (B. 1944)
  - Bobby Hart, 86, musician (Boyce and Hart) and songwriter ("Come a Little Bit Closer", "Last Train to Clarksville") (b. 1939)
  - Aaron Jaffe, 95, politician, member of the Illinois House of Representatives (1971–1985) and chairman of the Illinois Gaming Board (2005–2015) (b. 1930)
  - Charlie Kirk, 31, conservative activist, founder of Turning Point USA, shot (b. 1993)
  - Berel Lang, 92, academic (b. 1933)
  - Jeffrey Meldrum, 67, anthropologist (b. 1958)
  - Leo Pearlstein, 104, advertising executive and businessman (b. 1920)
  - Paula Shaw, 84, actress (Freddy vs. Jason, Mr. Young, The Best Little Whorehouse in Texas) (b. 1941)
- September 11
  - Alma Dawson, 82, librarian and scholar (b. 1943)
  - John D. Petersen, chemist, educator, academic administrator and president of the University of Tennessee system (2004–2009) (b. 1947)
- September 12
  - Eusebius J. Beltran, 91, Roman Catholic prelate, bishop of Tulsa (1978–1992) and archbishop of Oklahoma City (1992–2010) (b. 1934)
  - Jack Daniels, 92, running coach and modern pentathlete, Olympic silver medalist (1956) (b. 1933)
  - Andy Nelson, 92, football player (Baltimore Colts, New York Giants) and restaurateur (b. 1933)
  - Rico Oller, 67, politician, member of the California State Assembly (1996–2000) and Senate (2000–2004) (b. 1958)
  - Drummond Rennie, 89, nephrologist (b. 1936)
  - Johnnie J. Young, 87, politician, member of the South Carolina House of Representatives (1977–1978) (b. 1938)
- September 13
  - Bob Goodenow, 72, ice hockey player (Harvard Crimson, Flint Generals) and administrator, executive director of the NHLPA (1992–2005) (b. 1952)
  - Sandra Noll Hammond, 89, dancer (b. 1935)
  - Fred Kirschenmann, 90, agriculturalist (b. 1935)
  - John Masius, 75, television writer and producer (St. Elsewhere, Touched by an Angel, Providence), Emmy winner (1984, 1986) (b. 1950)
  - Mary Rose Oakar, 85, politician, member of the U.S. House of Representatives (1977–1993) (b. 1940)
  - Omen, 49, music producer ("I'm Single") (b. 1976) (body discovered on this date)
  - Earl S. Richardson, 81, academic, president of Morgan State University (1984–2010) (b. 1943)
  - Charley Rosen, 84, basketball player (Scranton Miners), coach (Rockford Lightning, Oklahoma City Cavalry) and author (b. 1941)
- September 14
  - Tony Bianco, 72, jazz drummer and composer (b. 1953)
  - Pat Crowley, 91, actress (Please Don't Eat the Daisies, Port Charles, Forever Female) (b. 1933)
  - Jim Edgar, 79, politician, governor (1991–1999) and secretary of state (1981–1991) of Illinois, member of the Illinois House of Representatives (1977–1979) (b. 1946)
  - Robert Gauldin, 93, composer and academic (b. 1931)
  - Tess Johnston, 93, diplomat and author (b. 1931)
- September 15
  - Paul Cohen, 91, American historian (Discovering History in China) (b. 1934)
  - Nancy Dembowski, 91, politician, member of the Indiana House of Representatives (2007–2013) (b. 1934)
  - Ted Ford, 78, baseball player (Cleveland Indians, Texas Rangers) (b. 1947)
  - Ron Friedman, 93, screenwriter (The Transformers: The Movie, G.I. Joe: A Real American Hero) (b. 1932)
  - Jill Godmilow, 81, filmmaker (Antonia: A Portrait of the Woman, Waiting for the Moon) (b. 1943)
  - Alan Iglitzin, 93, violist (Philadelphia String Quartet), founder of the Olympic Music Festival (b. 1931)
  - John Christopher Jones, 77, actor (On Our Own, The Village, Moonstruck) (b. 1948)
  - Marilyn Knowlden, 99, actress (Angels with Dirty Faces, Imitation of Life, Les Misérables) (b. 1926)
  - Joel Moss, 79, sound engineer and record producer (b. 1946)
  - Thomas Perry, 78, author (The Butcher's Boy, The Old Man) (b. 1947)
  - Murray Williamson, 91, Canadian-born ice hockey player and Olympic coach (1972) (b. 1934)
- September 16
  - Gaines C. Granade, 91, politician, member of the Georgia House of Representatives (1971–1972) (b. 1934)
  - Marilyn Hagerty, 99, newspaper columnist (Grand Forks Herald) (b. 1926)
  - Ronald Jensen, 89, mathematician and academic (b. 1936)
  - D. D. Lewis, 79, Hall of Fame football player (Mississippi State Bulldogs, Dallas Cowboys), Super Bowl champion (1972, 1978) (b. 1945)
  - Robert Redford, 89, actor (Butch Cassidy and the Sundance Kid, Captain America: The Winter Soldier, All the President's Men) and film director (Ordinary People), Oscar winner (1980) (b. 1936)
  - Ernest Shand, 85, politician, member of the Vermont House of Representatives (2003–2013) (b. 1940)
  - Franklin Southworth, 96, linguist (b. 1929)
  - Donald S. Zagoria, 97, author and academic (b. 1928)
- September 17
  - Jim Fahnhorst, 66, football player (San Francisco 49ers), Super Bowl champion (1985, 1989, 1990) (b. 1958)
  - John Harris, 73, golfer (b. 1952) (b. 1947)
  - Leo Hindery, 77, businessman.
  - Allie Light, 90, filmmaker and producer (In the Shadow of the Stars), Oscar winner (1991) (b. 1935)
  - Riff Markowitz, 86, American-born Canadian television producer (The Hitchhiker) and theatre director (b. 1938)
  - John Rubey, 73, president of AEG-TV and CEO of Fathom Events and Rubey Entertainment (b. 1951)
  - Loran Schmit, 96, politician, member of the Nebraska Legislature (1969–1993) (b. 1929)
  - John Searle, 93, philosopher (Chinese room) (b. 1932)
  - Sam Sparks, 86, jurist, judge of the U.S. District Court for West Texas (since 1991) (b. 1939)
- September 18
  - Agnes Gund, 87, philanthropist and arts patron, president of the Museum of Modern Art (1991–2002) (b. 1938)
  - Brett James, 57, country singer and songwriter ("Jesus, Take the Wheel"), Grammy winner (2007) (b. 1968)
  - Diane Martel, 63, music video director ("Blurred Lines", "We Can't Stop", "All I Want for Christmas Is You") and choreographer (b. 1962)
  - George Smoot, 80, astrophysicist, Nobel Prize laureate (2006) (b. 1945)
- September 19
  - J. Alfred Smith, 94, pastor (b. 1931)
  - Sonny Curtis, 88, Hall of Fame musician (The Crickets) and songwriter ("I Fought the Law", "Walk Right Back") (b. 1937)
  - Mike Wofford, 87, pianist (b. 1938)
- September 20
  - Herbert Bevard, 79, Roman Catholic prelate, bishop of Saint Thomas (2008–2020) (b. 1946)
  - Jeff Bottema, 65, BMX racer (b. 1960)
  - Brian Burke, 90, football player and coach (b. 1935)
  - Marian Burros, 92, food writer (The New York Times, The Washington Post) (b. 1933)
  - Franklin King, 68, football player (BC Lions, Calgary Stampeders, Toronto Argonauts) (b. 1957)
  - James Mitchum, 84, actor (Thunder Road, In Harm's Way, Moonrunners) (b. 1941)
  - Lois North, 103, politician, member of the Washington House of Representatives (1969–1975) and Senate (1975–1979) (b. 1921)
  - Lee Rupp, 87, politician, member of the Nebraska Legislature (1982–1989) (b. 1938)
  - C. Gene Samberson, 91, politician, member of the New Mexico House of Representatives (1970–1988) (b. 1934)
- September 21
  - Ron Carroll, 57, DJ, singer and music producer (b. 1968)
  - Shawn Clark, 50, college football coach (Appalachian State Mountaineers) (b. 1975)
  - Douglas Laux, 42, CIA officer and author (Left of Boom) (b. 1983)
  - Richard Morrissette, 69, politician, member of the Oklahoma House of Representatives (2004–2016) (b. 1956)
  - Bob Oldis, 97, baseball player (Washington Senators, Philadelphia Phillies), coach and scout (Miami Marlins) (b. 1928)
  - Stan Turner, 81, news anchor (KSTP-TV) (b. 1944)
- September 22
  - Aron Bielski, 98, Polish-born partisan (Bielski partisans) and Holocaust survivor (b. 1927)
  - Jerome A. Cohen, 95, legal scholar (b. 1930)
  - Bobby Grier, 82, football executive (New England Patriots, Houston Texans, Miami Dolphins) (b. 1942)
  - Gene Iba, 84, college basketball coach (Pittsburg State Gorillas, Houston Baptist Huskies, Baylor Bears) (b. 1940)
  - Henry Jaglom, 87, English-born filmmaker (A Safe Place, Tracks, Eating) (b. 1938)
  - Jonathan Lear, 76, philosopher and psychoanalyst (b. 1948)
  - Michael R. Quinlan, 80, businessman, CEO of McDonald's (1987–1999) (b. 1944)
  - Lee Weaver, 95, actor (Vanishing Point, Heaven Can Wait, O Brother, Where Art Thou?) (b. 1930)
- September 23
  - Buddy Bailey, 68, baseball manager (Pawtucket Red Sox, Daytona Cubs, Myrtle Beach Pelicans) (b. 1957)
  - Ashleigh Brilliant, 91, cartoonist and author (b. 1933)
  - T. J. Chung, 96, North Korean-born engineer (b. 1929)
  - Sue Hecht, 77, politician, member of the Maryland House of Delegates (1995–2003, 2007–2011) (b. 1947)
  - Rudi Johnson, 45, football player (Cincinnati Bengals, Detroit Lions) (b. 1979)
  - Russell Kulsrud, 97, physicist (b. 1928)
  - William T. Snyder, 93, academic administrator, chancellor of the University of Tennessee (1992–1999) (b. 1931)
  - Harlow Giles Unger, 94, historian (b. 1931)
- September 24
  - Belva Davis, 92, journalist (b. 1932)
  - Bill Ferrario, 47, football player (Green Bay Packers) (b. 1978)
  - Ira D. Gruber, 91, military historian (b. 1934)
  - David G. Kelley, 96, politician and farmer, member of the California State Assembly (1978–1992, 2000–2002) and State Senate (1992–2000) (b. 1928)
  - Sidney D. Kirkpatrick, 69, novelist (b. 1955)
  - Margaret Markey, 83, politician, member of the New York State Assembly (1999–2016) (b. 1941)
  - Sara Jane Moore, 95, accountant and convicted attempted assassin (Gerald Ford) (b. 1930)
  - Auseklis Ozols, 84, Latvian-born painter, founder of the New Orleans Academy of Fine Arts (b. 1941)
- September 25
  - Robert Barnett, 79, attorney (b. 1946)
  - Voddie Baucham, 56, Reformed Baptist minister, author and educator (Founders Seminary) (b. 1969)
  - George Hardy, 100, fighter pilot (Tuskegee Airmen) and military officer (b. 1925)
  - Jeffrey Alfred Legum, 83, philanthropist (b. 1941)
  - Blaine Milam, 35, convicted murderer (b. 1989)
  - Karen Olsen Beck, 95, Danish-born American-Costa Rican diplomat and politician, first lady of Costa Rica (1954–1958, 1970–1974) and MLA (1986–1990) (b. 1930)
  - Ronald Ramsey Sr., 66, judge and politician, member of the Georgia State Senate (2007–2015) (b. 1959)
  - Carl Reese, 82, college football coach (Missouri Tigers, East Carolina Pirates, Kansas Jayhawks) (b. 1943)
  - Assata Shakur, 78, political activist and fugitive (Black Liberation Army) (b. 1947)
- September 26
  - David Berliner, 87, educational psychologist (b. 1938)
  - Jim McNeely, 76, jazz pianist, composer and arranger (b. 1949)
  - Otto G. Obermaier, 89, attorney, U.S. attorney for the Southern District of New York (1989–1993) (b. 1936)
  - Saundra Herndon Oyewole, 82, microbiologist (b. 1943)
- September 27
  - Pat Hale, 88, politician, member of the Washington State Senate (1994–2004) (b. 1937)
  - Louis Lambert, 84, politician, member of the Louisiana State Senate (1972–1974, 1994–2004) (b. 1940)
  - Ray Lane, 95, sportscaster (Detroit Tigers, Detroit Red Wings, WJBK-TV) (b. 1930)
  - Myron Lowery, 78, politician, mayor of Memphis (2009) (b. 1946)
  - Russell M. Nelson, 101, religious leader and surgeon, president of the Church of Jesus Christ of Latter-day Saints (since 2018) (b. 1924)
  - Irwin Rovner, 84, archaeologist (b. 1941)
- September 28
  - Michael B. Druxman, 84, screenwriter (Dillinger and Capone, Keaton's Cop, Cheyenne Warrior) (b. 1941)
  - Theodore L. Hullar, 90, University chancellor (b. 1935)
  - Marcyliena Morgan, 75, linguistic anthropologist (b. 1950)
- September 29
  - Dragan Popović, 84, Yugoslav-born soccer player (Hajduk Split, St. Louis Stars, Kansas City Spurs) and coach (b. 1941)
  - Lally Weymouth, 82, journalist (The Washington Post) (b. 1943)
- September 30
  - Joshua Allen, 36, dancer (So You Think You Can Dance) and actor (b. 1989)
  - Lawrence Moten, 53, basketball player (Syracuse Orange, Vancouver Grizzlies, Washington Wizards) (b. 1972)
