= Deaths in September 2025 =

The following is a list of notable deaths in September 2025.

Entries for each day are listed alphabetically by surname. A typical entry lists information in the following sequence:

- Name, age, country of citizenship at birth, subsequent country of citizenship (if applicable), reason for notability, cause of death (if known), and reference.

== September 2025 ==
=== 1 ===
- Dhimitër Anagnosti, 89, Albanian film director (The Return of the Dead Army, Përralle Nga e Kaluara) and politician, minister of culture (1992–1994) and MP (1991–1996).
- Jimmy Bone, 75, Scottish football player (Partick Thistle, St Mirren) and manager.
- Christian Brincourt, 90, French journalist.
- Joe Bugner, 75, Hungarian-born British-Australian European heavyweight champion boxer (1971, 1972–1976) and actor (I'm for the Hippopotamus, Street Fighter).
- Sandra Caron, 89, British actress (The Crystal Maze).
- Tom Davin, 67, American food industry executive, complications from amyotrophic lateral sclerosis.
- Percy Fernández, 86, Bolivian engineer and politician, mayor of Santa Cruz de la Sierra (1990–1995, 2005–2020) and senator (1989).
- Walter Godefroot, 82, Belgian racing cyclist and team manager, complications from Parkinson's disease.
- Alejandro Goić, 85, Chilean Roman Catholic prelate, bishop of Osorno (1994–2003) and Rancagua (2004–2018).
- Graham Greene, 73, Canadian actor (Dances With Wolves, Die Hard with a Vengeance, The Green Mile) and recording artist, Grammy winner (2000).
- Jean Havlish, 89, American baseball player (Fort Wayne Daisies).
- Jodie Laubenberg, 68, American politician, member of the Texas House of Representatives (2003–2019).
- Lonnie Loach, 57, Canadian ice hockey player (Los Angeles Kings, Ottawa Senators, Mighty Ducks of Anaheim), cancer.
- John Luckadoo, 103, American bomber pilot.
- Graham MacGregor, 84, British medical academic.
- Pedro Massano, 77, Portuguese journalist and illustrator.
- Seán McLoughlin, 89, Irish hurler (Tipperary).
- Kelly Ana Morey, 57, New Zealand novelist and poet.
- Don Morrison, 75, American football player (New Orleans Saints, Baltimore Colts, Detroit Lions).
- Mitch Needelman, 72, American politician, member of the Florida House of Representatives (2000–2008).
- Graeme Phillips, 77, British theatre director, Lewy body dementia. (death announced on this date)
- Nick Rassas, 81, American football player (Atlanta Falcons).
- George Raveling, 88, American Hall of Fame basketball coach (Washington State Cougars, USC Trojans) and marketing director (Nike).
- Scott Spiegel, 67, American screenwriter (Evil Dead II), director (Intruder) and actor (Within the Woods).
- Peter Truscott, 84, New Zealand cricketer (Canterbury, Wellington, national team).
- James Van Horne, 90, American economist.
- Alfons Van Meirvenne, 92, Belgian painter and sculptor.
- Cheryl Waters, 78, American actress (Macon County Line, Girls in Chains, Ride the Hot Wind).
- Witold Ziaja, 84, Polish Olympic field hockey player (1972, 1976).

=== 2 ===
- Morten Arnfred, 80, Danish film director (Der er et yndigt land, The Russian Singer, Move Me) and screenwriter.
- Harvey Aronson, 96, American journalist (Newsday).
- Phil Barkdoll, 87, American racing driver (NASCAR Winston Cup Series) and team owner.
- Jean-Pierre Bouyxou, 79, French film critic and actor.
- Mino Carta, 91, Brazilian magazine publisher, co-founder of Veja, Istoé and CartaCapital.
- David H. Clark, 81, New Zealand-born British astrophysicist and science administrator.
- Giuseppe Costanzo, 92, Italian Roman Catholic prelate, bishop of Nola (1982–1989) and archbishop of Siracusa (1989–2008).
- Dan Darragh, 78, American football player (Buffalo Bills).
- Emilio Fede, 94, Italian journalist, director of TG1 (1981–1982), Studio Aperto (1991–1992) and TG4 (1992–2012).
- Al Flood, 90, Canadian banker.
- Robert Franz, 57, Canadian conductor (Windsor Symphony Orchestra), non-Hodgkin lymphoma.
- Larry Glueck, 83, American football player (Chicago Bears) and coach (Fordham Rams), NFL champion (1963).
- Patrick Hemingway, 97, American wildlife manager and writer.
- Wally Johannson, 89, Canadian politician, Manitoba MLA (1969–1977).
- William F. Kernan, 79, American Army general.
- Spyros Kokotos, 91, Greek architect.
- Indrek Meelak, 64, Estonian politician, MP (1999–2003).
- Paulão Moreira, 56, Brazilian beach volleyball player.
- Sir Eric Neal, 101, Australian academic administrator, governor of South Australia (1996–2001), chief commissioner of Sydney (1987–1988), and chancellor of Flinders University (2002–2010).
- Arthur S. Reber, 85, American psychologist.
- Glafiro Salinas Mendiola, 79, Mexican politician, deputy (2012–2015) and member of the Congress of Tamaulipas (2016–2021).
- Moustapha Sall, 58, Mauritanian football player (ACS Sonader Ksar, ASC Sonalec) and manager (national team).
- Gary Stubblefield, 74, American politician, member of the Arkansas Senate (since 2013) and House of Representatives (2011–2013).
- János Takács, 70, Hungarian table tennis player, world champion (1979).
- Gerd Völker, 83, German Olympic diver (1964).
- Garth Welch, 89, Australian ballet dancer and choreographer.
- Kazuko Yoshiyuki, 90, Japanese actress (Empire of Passion, Ponyo, Departures), pneumonia.

=== 3 ===
- Pascal Baurain, 55, Belgian politician, Walloon deputy (2016–2018, since 2024), bile duct cancer.
- Whitey Bell, 92, American basketball player (New York Knicks).
- Andre Champagne, 81, Canadian ice hockey player (Toronto Maple Leafs).
- Jacques Charrier, 88, French actor (Tiro al piccione, Because, Because of a Woman, Anatomy of a Marriage: My Days with Jean-Marc), film producer and painter.
- Cheng Ching-mao, 92, Taiwanese sinologist.
- Doris Cook, 94, American baseball player (Kalamazoo Lassies, Springfield Sallies, South Bend Blue Sox).
- Vito D'Amato, 81, Italian footballer (Lazio, Catania, Verona).
- Rosalyn Drexler, 98, American visual artist and writer (Lily), Emmy winner (1974).
- Kenneth Fernando, 93, Sri Lankan Anglican cleric, Bishop of Colombo (1992–2001).
- Johannes Friedrich, 77, German Lutheran cleric, Landesbischof of Bavaria (1999–2011).
- Bobby Graham, 80, Scottish footballer (Motherwell, Hamilton Academical, Liverpool).
- Robert Grosvenor, 88, American sculptor, co-founder of Park Place Gallery.
- Alfred E. Hierold, 83, German Catholic theologian.
- Keith Hodiak, 75, Guyanese-born British actor (Are You Being Served?, Doctor Who, Full Metal Jacket) and dancer.
- Tapson Kaseba, 32, Zambian footballer (Konkola Blades, NAPSA Stars, national team).
- Norman Kember, 93, British biophysicist and peace activist.
- Stephen Mendillo, 84, American actor (Slap Shot, Broadcast News, Lone Star).
- William Plizka, 80, American politician, member of the Wisconsin State Assembly (1984–1986).
- Felix Posen, 96, American businessman.
- Ted Robert, 81, Swiss singer-songwriter.
- Larry Robinson, 75, American politician, member of the North Dakota Senate (1989–2020).
- Guy Rocher, 101, Canadian sociologist.
- Rolling Ray, 28, American media personality.
- Vicente Sanchís, 77, Spanish basketball referee.
- Michael Timm, 62, German boxing trainer.

=== 4 ===
- Giorgio Armani, 91, Italian fashion designer, founder of Armani, liver failure.
- Baddiewinkle, 97, American influencer and internet personality.
- Ryszard Budka, 90, Polish footballer (Wisła Kraków, national team).
- Ned Chiodo, 83, American politician, member of the Iowa House of Representatives (1977–1985).
- Stuart Comberbach, 72, Zimbabwean diplomat, cancer.
- Jean Danguillaume, 92, French racing cyclist.
- William A. Farley, 87, American hair stylist (Goodfellas, The Exorcist, Ransom).
- Jamie Harvey, 70, Scottish darts player.
- Yukio Hashi, 82, Japanese enka singer.
- Darleane C. Hoffman, 98, American nuclear chemist.
- Phil Hoy, 88, American politician, member of the Indiana House of Representatives (2004–2008).
- Ian Jones, 93, Australian footballer (North Melbourne).
- Katharine, Duchess of Kent, 92, British royal.
- Rick Kolowski, 80, American politician, member of the Nebraska Legislature (2013–2021).
- Robert Jay Lifton, 99, American psychiatrist and author (Thought Reform and the Psychology of Totalism).
- Ted Mann, 72, American television writer and producer (NYPD Blue, Deadwood, Homeland), lung cancer.
- Joseph McNeil, 83, American Air Force major general and civil rights activist, member of the Greensboro Four.
- Shigeru Oda, 100, Japanese jurist, judge (1976–2003) and vice-president (1991–1994) of the International Court of Justice.
- Chris Pitt, 60, Australian Paralympic sport shooter (2016, 2020).
- Viktor Šlajchrt, 73, Czech journalist, writer and poet.
- Neil Summers, 81, English-American actor (Dick Tracy, RoboCop, The Shawshank Redemption) and stuntman.
- Robby Turner, 62, American pedal steel guitarist.
- Pia Velsi, 101, Italian actress (Parenti serpenti, ...And the Wild Wild Women, L'uccello migratore).

=== 5 ===
- Hooshmand Aghili, 88, Iranian singer.
- George Basalla, 97, American historian.
- Linda Bergen, 76, German singer.
- Andrew Casson, 82, British-born American mathematician.
- Maxine Clair, 86, American novelist and poet.
- Merwin Coad, 100, American minister and politician, member of the U.S. House of Representatives (1957–1963).
- Pietro Derossi, 92, Italian architect.
- Ken Dryden, 78, Canadian Hall of Fame ice hockey player (Montreal Canadiens), author, and politician, minister of social development (2004–2006) and MP (2004–2011), six-time Stanley Cup champion, cancer.
- Susan Firer, 76, American poet.
- Elizabeth Godwin, 28, British soldier, traffic collision.
- Davey Johnson, 82, American baseball player (Baltimore Orioles, Atlanta Braves) and manager (New York Mets), World Series champion (1966, 1970, 1986).
- Miklós Kásler, 75, Hungarian oncologist, minister of human resources (2018–2022).
- Babar Ali Khan, 62, Pakistani Olympic boxer (1984).
- Horst Krause, 83, German actor (No More Mr. Nice Guy, Schultze Gets the Blues, Polizeiruf 110).
- Antonín Kříž, 72, Czech Olympic biathlete (1976).
- Jelica Kurjak, 72, Serbian diplomat and politician.
- Patricia Lieb, 83, American poet and journalist.
- Bruce Loose, 66, American punk rock musician (Flipper), heart attack.
- Neville C. Luhmann Jr., 82, American physicist.
- Judy Manning, 82, American politician, member of the Georgia House of Representatives (1997–2012).
- G. A. Moore, 86, American football player (North Texas Mean Green) and high school coach (Pilot Point, Celina).
- Marcy Morrison, 90, American politician.
- Mayumi Narita, 55, Japanese swimmer, Paralympic champion (1996, 2000, 2004), bile duct cancer.
- José María Oliveira, 91, Spanish film director.
- Derry Power, 90, Irish actor (Super Gran, Educating Rita, Far and Away).
- Ervin J. Rokke, 85, American Air Force lieutenant general.
- Dan Runte, 61, American monster truck driver (Bigfoot), traffic collision.
- Jean Salut, 82, French rugby union player (Stade Toulousain, national team).
- Robin Shaw, 66, British solicitor.
- Ras Sheehama, 59, Namibian reggae musician, suicide.
- Walter Scott Smith Jr., 84, American jurist, judge of the U.S. District Court for the Western District of Texas (1984–2016).
- Silvio Tendler, 75, Brazilian filmmaker (Jango).
- José María Tojeira, 78, Spanish-born Salvadoran Jesuit priest.
- Mark Volman, 78, American musician (The Turtles, Flo & Eddie, The Mothers of Invention), complications from a blood disease.
- Ruth Weiss, 101, German-born South African journalist and writer.
- Robert Wells, 64, British boxer, Olympic bronze medallist (1984).
- Sir Robert Worcester, 91, American-born British pollster.
- Cas Wouters, 81, Dutch sociologist.

=== 6 ===
- Alfredo Ambrosetti, 94, Italian management consultant. (death announced on this date)
- Duane Ankney, 79, American politician, member of the Montana House of Representatives (2007–2015) and Senate (2015–2023).
- Arif Budimanta, 57, Indonesian politician, MP (2009–2014).
- David Baltimore, 87, American biologist and academic administrator, Nobel Prize laureate (1975), president of Caltech (1997–2005) and Rockefeller University (1990–1991), cancer.
- Lucien Bellavia, 65, French footballer (Thionville, Châteauroux, Nîmes).
- Ed Blakely, 87, American urban planner and academic.
- Rick Davies, 81, English musician (Supertramp), and songwriter ("Bloody Well Right", "Goodbye Stranger"), complications from multiple myeloma.
- Bill Davis, 74, American racing team owner (Bill Davis Racing).
- Christoph von Dohnányi, 95, German conductor (Oper Frankfurt, Cleveland Orchestra, Philharmonia Orchestra).
- Kai Engelke, 79, German poet, writer and music journalist.
- Gary Faigin, 74, American realist painter, prostate cancer.
- Leila Fowler, 92, Nigerian educationist.
- John R. Gaydos, 82, American Roman Catholic prelate, bishop of Jefferson City, Missouri (1997–2017).
- Rober Haddeciyan, 99, Armenian journalist, editor-in-chief of Marmara (since 1967).
- Dame Pat Harrison, 93, New Zealand educationalist.
- Walt Helmick, 81, American politician, member of the West Virginia Senate (1990–2013) and commissioner of agriculture (2013–2017), cancer.
- Tomohiro Ishikawa, 52, Japanese politician, MP (2007–2013), colorectal cancer.
- Karl Johan Johannessen, 82, Norwegian footballer (Herd, Lyn, Molde).
- Carlos Lezcano, 69, Puerto Rican baseball player (Chicago Cubs), cancer.
- Maru, 18, Japanese Internet cat, lung cancer.
- Noel Mullaney, 88, Irish Gaelic footballer (Shamrock Gaels, St Michael's, Sligo).
- Denis Murphy, 86, Irish hurler (Grenagh, St Finbarr's, Cork).
- Na Dong-hyun, 46, South Korean streamer and YouTuber.
- Paolo Nerozzi, 76, Italian trade unionist and politician, senator (2008–2013).
- Willie Parker, 80, American football player (Houston Oilers, Houston Texans/Shreveport Steamer).
- Raoul Peeters, 78, Belgian football manager.
- Placidus Pei Ronggui, 92, Chinese Roman Catholic prelate, coadjutor bishop of Luoyang (2003–2011).
- Pierre-Jean Ruff, 93, French Protestant pastor.
- Brian Cantwell Smith, 74, Canadian-American philosopher.
- Karen Soli, 77, American politician, member of the South Dakota House of Representatives (since 2013).
- Janusz Szukszta, 93, Polish chess player.
- Rosa Tarlovsky de Roisinblit, 106, Argentine activist, co-founder of the Grandmothers of Plaza de Mayo.
- Gustavo Torner, 100, Spanish painter and sculptor.
- Susan Xenarios, 79, American activist.

=== 7 ===
- Antonio Bailetti, 87, Italian road racing cyclist, Olympic champion (1960).
- Serge Boucheny, 96, French politician, deputy (1967–1968) and senator (1969–1986).
- John Burton, 92, American politician, member of the U.S. House of Representatives (1974–1983), the California Senate (1996–2004) and Assembly (1965–1974, 1988–1996).
- Don Cox, 85, American politician, member of the Washington House of Representatives (2009–2010).
- Stuart Craig, 83, English production designer (Harry Potter, Gandhi, The English Patient), Oscar winner (1983, 1989, 1997), complications from Parkinson's disease.
- Brian Dayett, 68, American baseball player (Chicago Cubs, New York Yankees), complications from Parkinson's disease.
- Tsering Dhondup, 65, Tibetan politician.
- Marilyn Diamond, 81, American author and detoxification promoter, complications from dementia.
- Dunshee de Abranches, 88, Brazilian football executive, president of Flamengo (1981–1983).
- Vasili Golovachyov, 77, Russian science fiction writer, heart attack.
- Ann Granger, 86, British crime writer (Cold in the Earth).
- Jaka, 39, American professional wrestler (EVOLVE, Beyond Wrestling), heart attack.
- Cahit Karakaş, 97, Turkish engineer and politician, minister of transport (1971) and speaker of the Grand National Assembly (1977–1980).
- Sir Edmund Lawrence, 93, Kittitian civil servant, governor-general (2013–2015).
- Jim Marshall, 94, American baseball player and manager (Chicago Cubs, New York Mets, Chunichi Dragons).
- Adalbert Ndzana, 86, Cameroonian Roman Catholic prelate, bishop of Mbalmayo (1987–2016).
- Dalmas Otieno, 80, Kenyan politician, MP (1988–2017).
- Ning Pan, 72, Chinese-born American engineer.
- John Penton, 100, American motorcycle racer.
- Jean-Marie Séverin, 84, Belgian politician, MP (1992–1995), Walloon deputy (1995–1999, 2000–2009).
- René Tendron, 91, French journalist (TF1).
- Badruddin Umar, 93, Bangladeshi political activist.

=== 8 ===
- Nazim Baykishiyev, 77, Azerbaijani stage designer, lung cancer.
- Dina Nath Bhagat, 79, Indian politician, Jammu and Kashmir MLA (since 2014).
- Inge Brück, 88, German singer ("Anouschka") and actress.
- Judy Jean Chapman, 83, American nurse.
- Chuang Chia-Fu, 90, Chinese table tennis player.
- Chuck Coates, 58, American professional wrestler.
- Robert Cooter, 80, American economist and legal scholar.
- Geoff Corkish, 72, Manx politician, MHK (2006–2018), cancer.
- Rajendra Dholakia, 68, Indian politician, Odisha MLA (2004–2014, since 2019), complications from heart transplant.
- Joseph Dube, 81, American weightlifter, Olympic bronze medalist (1968).
- Jutta Dümpe-Krüger, 63, German politician, MP (2002–2005).
- Fastnet Rock, 23, Australian Thoroughbred racehorse and sire.
- Robin Glendinning, 87, Northern Irish playwright and politician.
- Philippe Goddin, 81, Belgian literary critic (The Adventures of Tintin) and author.
- Jean-Paul Imbert, 83, French organist and teacher, drowned.
- Berel Lang, 92, American academic.
- Andrej Marinc, 94, Slovenian politician, general secretary of the ZKS (1982–1986), president of the Executive Council of the Socialist Republic of Slovenia (1972–1978).
- Pat Matson, 81, American football player (Cincinnati Bengals, Denver Broncos, Green Bay Packers).
- Charly Oleg, 94, French musician, composer and conductor.
- Tom Patton, 90, American baseball player (Baltimore Orioles).
- Angela Ro Ro, 75, Brazilian singer-songwriter.
- Salli Sachse, 82, American actress (Muscle Beach Party, The Trip, Wild in the Streets).
- Chris Steele-Perkins, 78, British photographer.
- Aza Takho-Godi, 102, Russian philologist.
- Sankarshan Thakur, 63, Indian journalist, editor of The Telegraph (since 2023).
- Hugo Valentin, 87, Italian South Tyrolean politician, member of the Landtag of South Tyrol (1978–1993) and the Regional Council of Trentino-Alto Adige/Südtirol (1978–1993).

=== 9 ===
- Paul Baccaglini, 41, American-born Italian football executive and television personality (Le Iene), president of Palermo (2017).
- Robert Bath, 88, Australian Olympic boxer (1956).
- David S. Baxter, 70, Scottish Mormon general authority.
- Stefano Benni, 78, Italian writer.
- Allan Cole, 74, Jamaican footballer (Náutico, national team) and songwriter ("War").
- Robert K. Corbin, 96, American politician, attorney general of Arizona (1979–1991) and president of the National Rifle Association (1992–1993), cardiac arrest.
- Emogene Creque, 106, British Virgin Islands politician, MHA (1965).
- Jim Dickson, 87, American baseball player (Houston Colt .45s, Cincinnati Reds, Kansas City Athletics).
- Sergio Doplicher, 84, Italian physicist.
- Michael Dryhurst, 87, British-born American film producer (Excalibur, Hudson Hawk, Never Say Never Again).
- Mar Elepaño, 70–71, Filipino-American filmmaker. (death announced on this date)
- Alison Leslie Gold, 80, American author.
- Haru Urara, 29, Japanese Thoroughbred racehorse, colic.
- Polly Holliday, 88, American actress (Alice, Gremlins, The Parent Trap), pneumonia.
- Asahi Kurizuka, 88, Japanese actor (Shinsengumi!, The Unfettered Shogun).
- Stephen P. Long, 75, British-born American plant physiologist, pancreatic cancer.
- Kenneth Margerison, 79, American historian.
- Robert D. Maurer, 101, American physicist, developer of optical fiber.
- Jeffrey Meldrum, 67, American anthropologist, brain cancer.
- Jacob Murey, 84, Soviet-born Israeli chess player.
- Andrew R. Neureuther, 84, American electrical engineer.
- Mark Norell, 68, American vertebrate paleontologist, heart failure.
- Geoffrey Somerset, 6th Baron Raglan, 93, British peer, businessman and politician.
- Alfred Rieber, 94, American historian.
- Bohumila Řimnáčová, 78, Czech gymnast, Olympic silver medalist (1968), world artistic team champion (1966).
- Armando Santiago, 93, Portuguese-born Canadian composer.

=== 10 ===
- Jutta Bauer, 70, German writer and illustrator, anaphylaxis.
- Christian Boner, 77, French journalist.
- Guido Convents, 69, Belgian historian.
- Sir Peter Cresswell, 81, English jurist, judge of the High Court of Justice (1991–2008), cancer.
- Bruce DuMont, 81, American radio talk show host (Beyond the Beltway) and television broadcaster.
- Brian Eisner, 85, American tennis player and coach.
- Deon Fourie, 92, South African army officer and academic.
- Phyllis Gardner, 75, American clinical pharmacologist and academic, early skeptic of Theranos, heart attack.
- Bobby Hart, 86, American musician (Boyce and Hart) and songwriter ("Come a Little Bit Closer", "Last Train to Clarksville").
- John Henderson, 87, Australian footballer (Collingwood).
- Mark Hine, 61, English footballer (Darlington, Peterborough United, Doncaster Rovers).
- Alan Howarth, Baron Howarth of Newport, 81, British politician, MP (1983–2005) and member of the House of Lords (since 2005), cancer.
- Aaron Jaffe, 95, American politician, member of the Illinois House of Representatives (1971–1985) and chairman of the Illinois Gaming Board (2005–2015).
- Charlie Kirk, 31, American conservative activist, co-founder of Turning Point USA, shot.
- Bärbel Köster, 68, German canoe sprinter, Olympic bronze medallist (1976).
- Norbert Lemire, 76, Canadian painter.
- Roberto Lonardo, 81–82, Uruguayan footballer (Dallas Tornado, Kansas City Spurs, Rochester Lancers).
- Stan Martin, 72, New Zealand rugby league player (Richmond Bulldogs) and coach (Cook Islands, women's national team).
- Chandra Nagamallaiah, 50, Indian-American motel manager, stabbed.
- Adam Niemiec, 78, Polish Olympic basketball player (1968).
- Roy Parnell, 81, English footballer (Tranmere Rovers, Bury, Everton).
- Leo Pearlstein, 104, American advertising executive and businessman.
- Nicky Ryan, 79, Irish music producer (Enya), four-time Grammy winner.
- Paula Shaw, 84, American actress (Freddy vs. Jason, Mr. Young, The Best Little Whorehouse in Texas).
- Garth Thomas, 61, American football player (Seattle Seahawks).
- Francesco Trapani, 68, Italian jeweller and luxury goods executive, CEO of Bulgari (1984–2014).
- Vinnie Roe, 27, Irish Thoroughbred racehorse.

=== 11 ===
- Imad Mohammad Alatiqi, 69, Kuwaiti oil scientist and politician, minister of oil (2024).
- Adriano Bernardini, 83, Italian Roman Catholic prelate, apostolic nuncio to Bangladesh (1992–1996), Argentina (2003–2011), and Italy (2011–2017).
- Alma Dawson, 82, American librarian and scholar.
- Marijke Djwalapersad, 73, Surinamese politician, chairperson of the National Assembly (1996–2000).
- Jim Doolan, 95, Irish politician, senator (1980–1981).
- Bevin Fortuin, 46, South African rugby union player (Cheetahs, national team) and coach (SWD Eagles), heart attack.
- Sam Gargan, 77, Canadian politician, member (1983–1999) and speaker (1995–2000) of the Legislative Assembly of the Northwest Territories, mayor of Fort Providence (2015–2018).
- Conor Gearty, 67, Irish legal scholar.
- Chris Hill, 80, British disc jockey.
- Emmanuel Karsen, 62, French actor.
- Janusz Majewski, 85, Polish Olympic fencer (1972).
- Francesco Mallegni, 85, Italian paleoanthropologist.
- Tiana Mangakahia, 30, Australian basketball player (Syracuse Orange), breast cancer.
- Per Mattsson, 77, Swedish actor (Fanny and Alexander, Anita: Swedish Nymphet).
- Minasse Haile, 95, Ethiopian politician, ambassador to the United States (1969–1971) and minister of foreign affairs (1971–1974).
- Mária J. Nagy, 91, Romanian linguist.
- John D. Petersen, 77, American chemist, educator, and academic administrator, president of the University of Tennessee system (2004–2009).
- Alberto Porta y Muñoz, 79, Spanish painter.
- Viv Prince, 84, English drummer (Pretty Things, The Jeff Beck Group).
- Libardo Ramírez Gómez, 91, Colombian Roman Catholic prelate, bishop of Armenia (1972–1986) and of Garzón (1986–2003).
- Kwadwo Safo Kantanka, 77, Ghanaian businessman and pastor.
- Eduardo Serrano, 82, Venezuelan actor (Juana la virgen, La Zulianita, La Sombra de Piera), lung cancer.
- P. P. Thankachan, 86, Indian politician, member (1982–2001) and speaker (1991–1995) of the Kerala Legislative Assembly.
- Ana Vidjen, 93, Croatian-Serbian sculptor.
- Philippe Ward, 67, French writer.
- Yu Menglong, 37, Chinese actor (Go Princess Go, Eternal Love, The Legend of the White Snake), fall.

=== 12 ===
- Bob Alcivar, 87, American music producer, arranger and composer.
- Eusebius J. Beltran, 91, American Roman Catholic prelate, bishop of Tulsa (1978–1992) and archbishop of Oklahoma City (1992–2010).
- Andrei Chemerkin, 53, Russian weightlifter, Olympic champion (1996).
- Jan Boland Coetzee, 80, South African rugby union player (Western Province, national team).
- Daniel Cremieux, 87, French fashion designer.
- Juha Dahllund, 71, Finnish Olympic footballer.
- Jack Daniels, 92, American running coach and modern pentathlete, Olympic silver medalist (1956).
- Sareeta Domingo, 44–45, British author.
- Ulf Fink, 82, German politician, MP (1994–2002).
- Ted Goveia, 55, Canadian football coach (Burlington Braves) and executive (Toronto Argonauts, Hamilton Tiger-Cats), cancer.
- Sir Peter Hirsch, 100, German-born British metallurgist.
- Kim Seong-min, 63, North Korean-born South Korean political activist, cancer.
- D. D. Lapang, 91, Indian politician, four-time chief minister of Meghalaya.
- Bill Manchuk, 78, Canadian football player (Edmonton Eskimos, Saskatchewan Roughriders), Grey Cup champion (1981, 1982).
- Andy Nelson, 92, American football player (Baltimore Colts, New York Giants) and restaurateur.
- Rico Oller, 67, American politician, member of the California State Assembly (1996–2000) and Senate (2000–2004).
- Tara Parra, 93, Mexican actress (My Universe In Lower Case, Más Sabe el Diablo por Viejo, Hidden Moon).
- Drummond Rennie, 89, American nephrologist.
- Lionel Vinche, 88, Belgian painter.
- Johnnie J. Young, 87, American politician, member of the South Carolina House of Representatives (1977–1978).

=== 13 ===
- Anatoly Akeyev, 71, Russian politician, member of the Supreme Soviet of the Soviet Union (1984–1989).
- Sir Peter Baxendell, 100, British oil executive (Shell).
- Karin Borner, 89, Swiss Olympic figure skater (1956).
- John Bradstock, 75, Australian rugby league footballer (Newtown). (death announced on this date)
- Gerard Cox, 85, Dutch singer and actor (Toen Was Geluk Heel Gewoon, The Debut), oesophageal cancer.
- Bob Goodenow, 72, American ice hockey player (Harvard Crimson, Flint Generals) and administrator, executive director of the NHLPA (1992–2005).
- Saleh Hachad, 86, Moroccan fighter pilot.
- Sandra Noll Hammond, 89, American dancer.
- Neda Al-Hilali, 86, American fiber artist.
- Eddie Hunter, 82, Scottish football player and manager (Queen's Park).
- John Jameson, 84, English cricketer (Warwickshire, national team).
- Fred Kirschenmann, 90, American agriculturalist.
- Stephen Luscombe, 70, English musician (Blancmange) and songwriter ("Living on the Ceiling", "Don't Tell Me").
- Wade MacLeod, 38, Canadian ice hockey player (Springfield Falcons, Manchester Storm, Lillehammer IK), brain cancer.
- Andreas Martin, 72, German schlager singer.
- John Masius, 75, American television writer and producer (St. Elsewhere, Touched by an Angel, Providence), Emmy winner (1984, 1986), complications from amyotrophic lateral sclerosis.
- Merica, 72, Brazilian footballer (Flamengo, Bahia, Confiança).
- John Munduga, 64, Ugandan Olympic boxer (1980).
- Max Nowlan, 86, Australian footballer (St Kilda).
- Mary Rose Oakar, 85, American politician, member of the U.S. House of Representatives (1977–1993).
- Omen, 49, American music producer ("I'm Single"). (body discovered on this date)
- John Painter, 92, Australian cellist.
- Farida Parveen, 70, Bangladeshi folk singer.
- Hermeto Pascoal, 89, Brazilian jazz musician, multiple organ failure.
- Earl S. Richardson, 81, American academic, president of Morgan State University (1984–2010).
- Charley Rosen, 84, American basketball player (Scranton Miners), coach (Rockford Lightning, Oklahoma City Cavalry) and author, cancer.
- George Sievwright, 88, Scottish footballer (Macclesfield Town, Oldham Athletic, Rochdale).
- Paulo Soares, 63, Brazilian journalist (ESPN Brazil, TV Cultura), multiple organ failure.
- Akiko Tsuruga, 58, Japanese jazz composer and keyboardist.
- Luther Wenge, 65, Papua New Guinean politician and judge, MP (1997–2012, since 2022) and twice governor of Morobe Province.
- Murad Yagizarov, 86, Azerbaijani actor (The Stepmother, Matteo Falcone, Babek).

=== 14 ===
- Suzana Agostini, 43, Brazilian footballer (Santos), uterine cancer.
- Max Basheer, 98, Australian Hall of Fame football administrator (SANFL).
- Tony Bianco, 72, American jazz drummer and composer.
- Pat Crowley, 91, American actress (Please Don't Eat the Daisies, Port Charles, Forever Female).
- Antoni Pacyfik Dydycz, 87, Polish Roman Catholic prelate, bishop of Drohiczyn (1994–2014).
- Jim Edgar, 79, American politician, governor (1991–1999) and secretary of state (1981–1991) of Illinois, member of the Illinois House of Representatives (1977–1979), complications from pancreatic cancer.
- Robert Gauldin, 93, American composer and academic.
- Eddie Giacomin, 86, Canadian Hall of Fame ice hockey player (New York Rangers, Detroit Red Wings), coach, and broadcaster (New York Islanders).
- Sir Nicholas Grimshaw, 85, English architect (125 Park Road, Oxford Ice Rink, National Space Centre).
- Ricky Hatton, 46, English professional boxer, IBF world super lightweight champion (2005–2006, 2007) and WBA world welterweight champion (2006), hanged.
- Sarada Hoffman, 96, Indian dancer and choreographer.
- René Homier-Roy, 85, Canadian journalist and television presenter.
- Tess Johnston, 93, American diplomat and author, complications from COVID-19.
- John Kilpatrick, 86, Australian footballer (St Kilda).
- Sir David Knox, 92, British politician, MP (1970–1997).
- Frank Lazarus, 86, South African-British composer (A Day in Hollywood / A Night in the Ukraine).
- Safiatou Lopez, 49, Burkinabé businesswoman and political activist.
- Jesús Martínez Ross, 91, Mexican politician, deputy (1973–1975) and governor of Quintana Roo (1975–1981).
- John Martinkus, 56, Australian journalist.
- Siegmund Nimsgern, 85, German operatic bass-baritone.
- Edward Ormondroyd, 99, American children's novelist (David and the Phoenix).
- Gianni Quaranta, 82, Italian production designer (A Room with a View, La Traviata, 1900), Oscar winner (1987).
- Isabel Rilvas, 90, Portuguese parachutist.
- Barry Roberts, 79, New Zealand cricketer (Northern Districts).
- Jaime Rodríguez, 66, Salvadoran football player (Léon, national team) and manager (San Salvador), cardiac arrest.
- Fumitaka Sato, 87, Japanese astrophysicist and theoretical physicist, pneumonia.
- Beverly Thomson, 61, Canadian journalist and news anchor (CTV News), breast cancer.
- Václav Žák, 80, Czech politician and publicist, member of the Czech National Council (1990–1992) and signatory of Charter 77.

=== 15 ===
- Luboš Adamec, 66, Czech Olympic sport shooter (1988, 1992).
- April March, 90, American burlesque dancer.
- Brigitte Asdonk, 77, German political activist and convicted criminal.
- Carlo Becchi, 85, Italian physicist (BRST quantization).
- Habib Boromand Dashghapu, 64, Iranian Shiite cleric and politician, MP (1988–1992, 2012–2016), cancer.
- Ymania Brown, 62, Samoan LGBTQ rights activist and lawyer.
- Manolo Cardo, 85, Spanish football player and manager (Sevilla).
- Ione Christensen, 91, Canadian politician, senator (1999–2006), commissioner of Yukon (1979), and mayor of Whitehorse (1976–1979).
- Paul Cohen, 91, American historian (Discovering History in China).
- Hallard Croft, 89, British mathematician.
- William C. Davis, 86, Canadian politician, Ontario MPP (1985–1987).
- Nancy Dembowski, 91, American politician, member of the Indiana House of Representatives (2007–2013).
- Ted Ford, 78, American baseball player (Cleveland Indians, Texas Rangers).
- David Frayne, 91, English Anglican priest.
- Ron Friedman, 93, American screenwriter (The Transformers: The Movie, G.I. Joe: A Real American Hero), cardiopulmonary arrest.
- Jill Godmilow, 81, American filmmaker (Antonia: A Portrait of the Woman, Waiting for the Moon).
- James Grashow, 83, American sculptor and woodcut artist.
- Matti Hamberg, 93, Finnish Olympic speed skater (1956).
- Alan Iglitzin, 93, American violist (Philadelphia String Quartet), founder of the Olympic Music Festival.
- John Christopher Jones, 77, American actor (On Our Own, The Village, Moonstruck).
- Ian Judge, 79, English theatre and opera director.
- Marilyn Knowlden, 99, American actress (Angels with Dirty Faces, Imitation of Life, Les Misérables).
- Ferenc Lénárt, 60, Hungarian Olympic weightlifter (1992).
- Larry Littlebird, 84, American painter, filmmaker and actor.
- Bob Milano, 85, American college baseball coach (California Golden Bears), complications from Alzheimer's disease.
- Richard Moe, 88, American attorney and historic preservation advocate.
- Joel Moss, 79, American sound engineer and record producer, aneurysm.
- Slavko Obadov, 77, Serbian judoka, Olympic bronze medallist (1976).
- Thomas Perry, 78, American author (The Butcher's Boy, The Old Man).
- Pat Power, 83, Australian Roman Catholic prelate, auxiliary bishop of Canberra and Goulburn (1986–2012).
- Silu Seppälä, 70, Finnish bassist (Leningrad Cowboys), actor (The Match Factory Girl, Drifting Clouds) and composer.
- Harald Serafin, 93, Austrian opera singer and actor.
- Anita Studer, 81, Swiss ornithologist.
- Toby Talbot, 96, American cinema owner and film distributor.
- Tang Liang Hong, 89, Singaporean politician, MP (1995–1997).
- Paulo Tchipilica, 85, Angolan politician, minister of justice (1992–2004).
- Ting Mao-shih, 99, Taiwanese diplomat, minister of foreign affairs (1987–1988), representative to the United States (1988–1994), and secretary-general to the president (1999–2000).
- Murray Williamson, 91, Canadian-born American ice hockey player and Olympic coach (1972).

=== 16 ===
- Sebastià Bardolet i Pujol, 91, Spanish Roman Catholic monk, abbot of Santa Maria de Montserrat Abbey (1989–2000).
- Shivram Bhoje, 83, Indian nuclear scientist.
- Yehuda Zvi Blum, 93, Slovak-born Israeli legal scholar, permanent representative to the United Nations (1978–1984).
- Joke Bruijs, 73, Dutch actress, singer, and cabaret artist (Toen Was Geluk Heel Gewoon).
- Judy Burke, 94, New Zealand tennis player.
- Ricardo Cabrisas, 88, Cuban politician, vice president of the Council of Ministers (since 2009), minister of foreign trade and investment (2023–2024).
- Oscar Calics, 85, Argentine footballer (Banfield, San Lorenzo, national team).
- Kim Elgie, 92, Scottish rugby union player and South African cricketer.
- Gaines C. Granade, 91, American politician, member of the Georgia House of Representatives (1971–1972).
- Séverin Granvorka, 77, French volleyball player (national team) and head coach (national women's team, Switzerland national women's team).
- Marilyn Hagerty, 99, American newspaper columnist (Grand Forks Herald).
- Ronald Jensen, 89, American mathematician and academic.
- Michael Kenward, 80, British science writer. (death announced on this date)
- D. D. Lewis, 79, American Hall of Fame football player (Mississippi State Bulldogs, Dallas Cowboys), Super Bowl champion (1972, 1978).
- Tomas Lindberg, 52, Swedish death metal singer (At the Gates, Grotesque), adenoid cystic carcinoma.
- Marion Maddox, 60, Australian academic and author.
- Stanley Meadows, 94, British actor (The Ipcress File, Coronation Street, Payroll).
- Dejan Milovanović, 41, Serbian footballer (Red Star Belgrade, Lens, national team), heart attack.
- Volodymyr Morhun, 87, Ukrainian biologist.
- Robert Redford, 89, American actor (Butch Cassidy and the Sundance Kid, All the President's Men) and film director (Ordinary People), Oscar winner (1980).
- Ante Roso, 73, Croatian general.
- Tullio Rossi, 77, Italian racing cyclist.
- Novatus Rugambwa, 67, Tanzanian Roman Catholic prelate, apostolic nuncio to Angola (2010–2015), Honduras (2015–2019), and New Zealand (2019–2024).
- Ernest Shand, 85, American politician, member of the Vermont House of Representatives (2003–2013).
- Milivoj Solar, 89, Croatian literary theorist and historian.
- Franklin Southworth, 96, American linguist.
- Vladimir Timoshenko, 82, Russian diplomat, ambassador to Benin (2002–2008).
- Sir Jonathan Tod, 86, British Royal Navy officer.
- Joseph Urusemal, 73, Micronesian politician, president (2003–2007).
- Lasse Westman, 86, Swedish film director and cinematographer.
- Jack Williams, 94, New Zealand cricketer (Canterbury).
- Donald S. Zagoria, 97, American author and academic.

=== 17 ===
- Viktor Ageyev, 84, Russian boxer.
- Abdul Gani Bhat, 90, Indian poet and political activist, co-founder of MUF.
- Mel Bungey, 91, Australian politician, member of the House of Representatives (1974–1983).
- José María Castellano, 78, Spanish businessman, CEO of Inditex Group (1997–2005), president of ONO (2008–2014) and Abanca (2011–2014).
- Roger Climpson, 93, British-born Australian television newsreader (Nine Network, Seven Network) and host (This is Your Life).
- Hans Enoksen, 69, Greenlandic politician, prime minister (2002–2009), member (since 1987) and speaker (2018) of the Inatsisartut.
- Jim Fahnhorst, 66, American football player (San Francisco 49ers), Super Bowl champion (1985, 1989, 1990).
- Roland Göhler, 82, German rower, Olympic silver medalist (1968).
- Arturo Gómez-Pompa, 90, Mexican biologist.
- Ruslan Gostev, 80, Russian politician, MP (1993–2016).
- Daniela Hammer-Tugendhat, 79, Austrian art historian.
- John Harris, 73, American golfer, acute myeloid leukemia.
- Leo Hindery, 77, American businessman.
- Allie Light, 90, American filmmaker and producer (In the Shadow of the Stars), Oscar winner (1991), heart failure.
- Riff Markowitz, 86, Canadian-American television producer (The Hitchhiker) and theatre director.
- Gajanan Mehendale, 77, Indian historian, heart attack.
- Dame Joan Metge, 95, New Zealand anthropologist.
- Donald Oliver, 86, Canadian politician, senator (1990–2013).
- Mario de Jesús Pérez Jiménez, 76, Spanish computer scientist and academic, member of the Academia Europaea (since 2011).
- Giuseppe Maria Reina, 70, Italian politician, deputy (2006–2008).
- John Rubey, 73, American president of AEG-TV and CEO of Fathom Events.
- Sergio Salvati, 91, Italian cinematographer (Four of the Apocalypse, Sette note in nero, City of the Living Dead).
- Loran Schmit, 96, American politician, member of the Nebraska Legislature (1969–1993).
- Barry Seal, 87, British politician, MEP (1979–1999), acute myeloid leukaemia.
- John Searle, 93, American philosopher (Chinese room).
- Babak Shahbazi, 43–44, Iranian spy, execution by hanging.
- Evgeny Shulepov, 67, Russian politician, mayor of Vologda (2008–2016), MP (2016–2021), member of the Legislative Assembly of Vologda Oblast (2021–2025).
- Sam Sparks, 86, American jurist, judge of the U.S. District Court for West Texas (since 1991).
- David Stabler, 72, American journalist (The Oregonian), acute myeloid leukemia.
- Jacob Thoomkuzhy, 94, Indian Syro-Malabar Catholic hierarch, bishop of Mananthavady (1973–1995), Thamarassery (1995–1996) and archbishop of Trichur (1996–2007).
- Dominique Wilms, 95, Belgian actress (La môme vert-de-gris, The Women Couldn't Care Less, Caesar the Conqueror).

=== 18 ===
- Ed Acosta, 81, Panamanian baseball player (San Diego Padres, Pittsburgh Pirates).
- Óscar Almaraz Smer, 57, Mexican politician, member of the Congress of Tamaulipas (2011–2013) and federal deputy (2021–2024).
- Fausto Amodei, 91, Italian politician and singer, deputy (1968–1972).
- Déjean Bélizaire, 90, Haitian politician, president of the Senate (1991–1993).
- Mohammed ben Abdallah, 81, Ghanaian playwright.
- Jairus Birech, 32, Kenyan steeplechase runner.
- Anita Borges, 78, Indian pathologist, heart attack.
- Ken Boyd, 73, American basketball player (New Orleans Jazz).
- Miguel Calderón Gómez, 74, Cuban basketball player (national team), Olympic bronze medallist (1972).
- Amade Camal, 71, Mozambican transport industry executive and politician, MP (1994–1999).
- Ambroise Dupont, 88, French politician, senator (1989–2014).
- Rodney Godshall, 81, American operatic bass.
- Sir Gerald Gordon, 96, Scottish lawyer. (death announced on this date)
- Agnes Gund, 87, American philanthropist and arts patron, president of the Museum of Modern Art (1991–2002).
- Charles Guthrie, Baron Guthrie of Craigiebank, 86, British field marshal, assistant chief (1987–1989) and chief of the general staff (1994–1997), chief of the defence staff (1997–2001), ruptured cerebral aneurysm.
- Alfred Heer, 63, Swiss politician, MNC (since 2007).
- Brett James, 57, American country singer and songwriter ("Jesus, Take the Wheel"), Grammy winner (2007), plane crash.
- Hermann Kindle, 90, Liechtenstein Olympic alpine skier.
- István Kiss, 76, Hungarian Olympic gymnast (1972).
- Irma Könye, 71, Hungarian sprinter.
- František Ledecký, 84, Czech speedway motorcycle rider (national team) and coach.
- Florin Marin, 72, Romanian football player (Rapid București, FCSB) and manager (Farul Constanța), complications from dementia.
- Diane Martel, 63, American music video director ("Blurred Lines", "We Can't Stop", "All I Want for Christmas Is You") and choreographer, breast cancer.
- Lottie B. Scott, 88, American civil rights advocate.
- Robo Shankar, 46, Indian comedian and actor (Maari, Velainu Vandhutta Vellaikaaran, Mannar Vagaiyara), kidney and liver failure.
- George Smoot, 80, American astrophysicist, Nobel Prize laureate (2006), heart attack.
- Akella Venkata Suryanarayana, 75, Indian screenwriter and playwright.
- Fumio Ueda, 77, Japanese politician, mayor of Sapporo (2003–2015), pancreatic cancer.
- Josef Volf, 86, Czech Olympic cyclist (1960).
- Gennady Zhilin, 79, Russian jurist, judge of the Constitutional Court (1999–2016).

=== 19 ===
- Abdi Baleta, 84, Albanian diplomat.
- Jeff Bottema, 65, American motocross racer.
- Joël Bourdin, 87, French politician, senator (1989–2014).
- Paddy Carolan, 96, Irish Gaelic footballer (CLG Cúchulainn, Cavan).
- Sonny Curtis, 88, American Hall of Fame musician (The Crickets) and songwriter ("I Fought the Law", "Walk Right Back"), complications from pneumonia.
- Julieta Fierro, 77, Mexican astrophysicist.
- Julio Frade, 82, Uruguayan comedian.
- Zubeen Garg, 52, Indian singer-songwriter and actor (Tumi Mor Matho Mor, Mon Jaai, Rodor Sithi), drowned.
- Jonathan González, 30, Ecuadorian footballer (Independiente del Valle, L.D.U. Quito, national team), shot.
- Peter Gurney, 93, British bomb disposal expert.
- A. K. M. Kamruzzaman, 85, Bangladeshi politician, MP (1991–1996).
- Thanmanpillai Kanagasabai, 86, Sri Lankan politician, MP (2004–2010).
- Bryan Kneale, 95, Manx artist and sculptor.
- Jean-Pierre Kuskowiak, 76, French footballer (Valenciennes, Nancy, Melun).
- Anne Rankin Mahoney, 88, American sociologist.
- Ryuji Matsumura, 87, Japanese politician, member of the House of Councillors (1995–2013).
- Ian Monk, 65, British writer and translator.
- Antonio Rivero Taravillo, 62, Spanish writer and poet.
- Hema Sane, 85, Indian botanist.
- J. Alfred Smith, 94, American pastor.
- JD Twitch, 57, Scottish DJ (Optimo), brain tumour.
- Wally Warning, 76-77, Aruban reggae musician.
- Mike Wofford, 87, American jazz pianist, hyponatremia.

=== 20 ===
- Alcide Angeloni, 98, Italian politician, senator (1983–1992).
- Matt Beard, 47, English football manager (Burnley Women, Liverpool Women), suicide.
- Herbert Bevard, 79, American Roman Catholic prelate, bishop of Saint Thomas (2008–2020).
- Ivar Bøksle, 78, Norwegian singer and accordionist.
- Brian Burke, 90, American football player and coach, complications from Alzheimer's disease.
- Marian Burros, 92, American food writer (The New York Times, The Washington Post), heart attack.
- Iain Coleman, 67, British politician, MP (1997–2005).
- Harry Gilbert, 71–72, British biochemist.
- Mikhail Gorbanevsky, 72, Russian linguist.
- Egil Gade Greve, 95, Norwegian banker.
- Takatoshi Ito, 74, Japanese economist.
- Bill Jenkins, 68, Canadian curler, world junior champion (1977).
- Waqar Masood Khan, 74, Pakistani civil servant and political advisor, four-time finance secretary.
- Franklin King, 68, American football player (BC Lions, Calgary Stampeders, Toronto Argonauts).
- David Kroyanker, 86, Israeli architect.
- Stanislav Lakoba, 72, Abkhaz historian and politician, secretary of the Security Council (2005–2009, 2011–2013), traffic collision.
- Jan Lála, 87, Czech footballer (SK Slavia Prague, FC Lausanne-Sport).
- Tom Matano, 76, Japanese automobile designer.
- James Mitchum, 84, American actor (Thunder Road, In Harm's Way, Moonrunners).
- Enrique Molina Pico, 87, Argentine military officer, chief of the general staff of the Navy (1993–1996).
- Aryeh Moskona, 78, Bulgarian-born Israeli actor (Kazablan, Charlie and a Half, Beyond the Sea) and singer, chronic lung disease.
- Lois North, 103, American politician, member of the Washington House of Representatives (1969–1975) and Senate (1975–1979).
- Horst Queck, 81, German ski jumper.
- Lee Rupp, 87, American politician, member of the Nebraska Legislature (1982–1989).
- Roberto Russo, 77, Italian film director (Flirt), screenwriter and photographer.
- C. Gene Samberson, 91, American politician, member of the New Mexico House of Representatives (1970–1988).
- Yuri Shaygardanov, 71, Russian cinematographer (Vagrant Bus, Cynics, Women's Property).
- Władysław Zieliński, 90, Polish sprint canoeist, Olympic bronze medallist (1960).

=== 21 ===
- Salahuddin Ahmad, 77, Bangladeshi jurist, attorney general (2008–2009).
- Charanjit Ahuja, 71, Indian composer, liver cancer.
- Elmar Budde, 90, German musicologist.
- Ron Carroll, 57, American DJ, singer and music producer, heart attack.
- Shawn Clark, 50, American college football coach (Appalachian State Mountaineers).
- Jonathan Clements, 62, British financial journalist.
- Michel Dessaint, 90, French politician, deputy (1995–1997).
- Stu Freebairn, 93, New Zealand rugby union player (Manawatu, national team).
- Leo Gerard, 78, Canadian steelworker and labour leader.
- Alexander Gorban, 73, Russian scientist.
- Ruth Johns, 91, British social historian, journalist and author.
- Edward Kravitz, 92, American neuroscientist.
- Léon Landini, 99, French resistance fighter and political activist, president of the Pole of Communist Revival in France (2004–2006).
- André Landzaat, 81, Dutch actor (General Hospital), pneumonia.
- Douglas Laux, 42, American CIA officer and author (Left of Boom).
- Richard Morrissette, 69, American politician, member of the Oklahoma House of Representatives (2004–2016), bile duct cancer.
- Bob Oldis, 97, American baseball player (Washington Senators, Philadelphia Phillies), coach and scout (Miami Marlins).
- Bernie Parent, 80, Canadian Hall of Fame ice hockey player (Philadelphia Flyers, Toronto Maple Leafs, Boston Bruins), Stanley Cup champion (1974, 1975).
- Roland Pidoux, 78, French cellist (Via Nova Quartet) and conductor.
- Robert E. Rich, 98, American intelligence official, deputy director of the National Security Agency (1982–1986).
- Peter Ryan, 91, Australian rugby league footballer (Newtown, Parramatta).
- Serdu, 85, Belgian cartoonist (Spirou) and illustrator.
- Sulejman Spaho, 76, Serbian politician, MP (2003–2012).
- John Stapleton, 79, English broadcaster (Nationwide, Watchdog) and journalist (ITV), complications from Parkinson's disease and pneumonia.
- Quintard Taylor, 76, American historian, founder of BlackPast.org.
- Stan Turner, 81, American news anchor (KSTP-TV), cancer.

=== 22 ===
- Angus Abbey, 99, Australian footballer (Footscray).
- Aron Bielski, 98, Polish-American partisan (Bielski partisans) and Holocaust survivor.
- Dickie Bird, 92, English cricket umpire and player (Yorkshire, Leicestershire).
- Jerome A. Cohen, 95, American legal scholar.
- Edwin Colaço, 87, Indian Roman Catholic prelate, bishop of Amravati (1995–2006) and Aurangabad (2006–2015).
- Anton II, Prince Esterházy, 88, Hungarian aristocrat.
- Mauricio Fernández Garza, 75, Mexican politician, senator (1994–2000), mesothelioma.
- Bobby Grier, 82, American football executive (New England Patriots, Houston Texans, Miami Dolphins).
- David Hirst, 89, British journalist (The Guardian, The Irish Times, St. Petersburg Times), cancer.
- Gene Iba, 84, American college basketball coach (Pittsburg State Gorillas, Houston Baptist Huskies, Baylor Bears).
- Henry Jaglom, 87, English-American filmmaker (A Safe Place, Tracks, Eating).
- Cecilia Johnson, 79, Ghanaian politician, chair of the Council of State (2013–2017).
- Thomas Kellein, 70, German art historian, director of the Kunsthalle Basel (1988–1995), the Kunsthalle Bielefeld (1996–2010), and the Chinati Foundation (2011–2012).
- Kosa, Indian Maoist politician and rebel leader, shot.
- Jane Frances Kuka, 72, Ugandan activist and politician, MP (1996–2001).
- Jean-Louis Le Mouël, 87, French geographer.
- Jonathan Lear, 76, American philosopher and psychoanalyst.
- Gilberto Pereira Lopes, 98, Brazilian Roman Catholic prelate, bishop of Ipameri (1966–1975), archbishop coadjutor (1975–1982) and archbishop (1982–2004) of Campinas.
- Lamberto Mari, 92, Italian Olympic diver.
- Merv Moy, 95, Australian Olympic basketball player (1956).
- Neneca, 45, Brazilian footballer (União Barbarense, Santo André, América Mineiro), complications from a heart attack.
- Enver Petrovci, 71, Kosovar actor (O sa mirë, Bolji život, Father).
- Michael R. Quinlan, 80, American businessman, CEO of McDonald's (1987–1999).
- Avraham Rinat, 96, Dutch-Israeli theoretical physicist. (death announced on this date)
- Bijay Kumar Satpathy, 73, Indian weightlifter.
- Jim Snow, 91, Australian politician, MP (1983–1996).
- Ricardo Pido Tancinco, 92, Filipino Roman Catholic prelate, bishop of Calbayog (1974–1979).
- Reynante Tolentino, 74, Filipino politician, governor of Aurora (since 2024) and mayor of Dipaculao (2007–2016).
- Lee Weaver, 95, American actor (Easy Street, The 40 Year Old Virgin, G.I. Joe: A Real American Hero).
- David Yeandle, 70, British Germanist.

=== 23 ===
- Shewarge Amare Alene, 30, Ethiopian marathon runner.
- Buddy Bailey, 68, American baseball manager (Pawtucket Red Sox, Daytona Cubs, Myrtle Beach Pelicans), cancer.
- Anne Baker, 111, British historical writer (Wings over Kabul: The First Airlift) and supercentenarian.
- Jean-Louis Bérot, 78, French rugby union player (US Dax, Toulouse, national team).
- Claudia Cardinale, 87, Italian actress (Once Upon a Time in the West, The Leopard, 8½).
- T. J. Chung, 96, North Korean-born American engineer.
- Solomon Ewuga, 70, Nigerian politician, senator (2011–2015).
- Ivan Gaal, 87, Australian documentary filmmaker.
- Tatiana Goricheva, 78, Russian philosopher, theologian and feminist.
- Sue Hecht, 77, American politician, member of the Maryland House of Delegates (1995–2003, 2007–2011).
- Rudi Johnson, 45, American football player (Cincinnati Bengals, Detroit Lions), suicide.
- Dieter Kaufmann, 84, Austrian composer.
- Josephine Keegan, 90, Scottish-Irish pianist, fiddler and composer.
- Ritva Koivula, 92, Finnish Olympic swimmer (1952).
- Russell Kulsrud, 97, American physicist.
- Pavlo Lapshyn, 37, Ukrainian convicted murderer.
- Cecilio Lastra, 74, Spanish boxer, WBA featherweight champion (1977–1978).
- Malcolm A. S. Moore, 81, British-American biologist.
- Bruce Morrison, 91, New Zealand cricketer (Wellington, national team).
- Carlos Pagán, 71, Puerto Rican politician, senator (1997–2001, 2005–2009).
- Rik Pauwels, 88, Belgian footballer (Tubantia Borgerhout) and manager (KSK Beveren, Waterschei Thor).
- Nikola Pilić, 86, Croatian tennis player.
- Ruth Posner, 96, Polish Holocaust survivor and actress (Making News, The Ruth Rendell Mysteries, Casualty), assisted suicide.
- Hernán Romero, 83, Peruvian actor (The Green Wall, Mirage, Red Ink).
- Dick Roth, 77, American swimmer, Olympic champion (1964).
- Abdulaziz Al Sheikh, 84, Saudi Arabian Islamic cleric and scholar, grand mufti (since 1999).
- William T. Snyder, 93, American academic administrator, chancellor of the University of Tennessee (1992–1999).
- Ziad Takieddine, 75, Lebanese-French arms dealer.
- Sir Tumu Te Heuheu, 84, New Zealand Māori tribal leader, paramount chief of Ngāti Tūwharetoa (since 1997).
- Danny Thompson, 86, English bassist (Pentangle, Alexis Korner's Blues Incorporated).
- Coby Timp, 95, Dutch actress.
- Nalin Pradeep Udawela, 56, Sri Lankan actor (Aswesuma, Asai Man Piyabanna, Joyful Journeys).
- Harlow Giles Unger, 94, American historian.
- Wootton Bassett, 17, British Thoroughbred racehorse, aspiration pneumonia.
- Kongjian Yu, 62, Chinese landscape architect and urban planner (sponge city), plane crash.
- Sergio Zaninelli, 96, Italian economist and academic administrator, rector of Università Cattolica del Sacro Cuore (1998–2002).

=== 24 ===
- Angelito Antonio, 86, Filipino painter and academic, septic shock.
- Lionel Barthold, 99, American electrical engineer.
- S. L. Bhyrappa, 94, Indian novelist (Bheemakaaya, Dharmashree, Matadana).
- Ashleigh Brilliant, 91, American cartoonist and author.
- Guillermo Caram Herrera, 84, Dominican economist and politician.
- Patricia Crowther, 97, British Wiccan occultist, complications from dementia.
- Belva Davis, 92, American journalist.
- Bill Ferrario, 47, American football player (Green Bay Packers).
- Jack Flaherty, 91, Canadian politician, Alberta MLA (2004–2008).
- Kerstin Fredga, 89, Swedish astronomer.
- Lyudmila Gavrilova, 73, Russian actress (Northern Rhapsody, Mimino, Katala).
- Bau Graves, 73, American musician and musicologist, heart failure.
- Ira D. Gruber, 91, American military historian.
- George Hardy, 100, American fighter pilot (Tuskegee Airmen) and military officer.
- Oskar Ibru, 67, Nigerian conglomerate industry executive, chairman and CEO of the Ibru Organization (since 2016).
- David G. Kelley, 96, American politician, member of the California State Assembly (1978–1992, 2000–2002) and State Senate (1992–2000).
- Sidney D. Kirkpatrick, 69, American novelist.
- Margaret Markey, 83, American politician, member of the New York State Assembly (1999–2016).
- Sara Jane Moore, 95, American accountant and convicted attempted assassin (Gerald Ford).
- Michael O'Connor, 83, New Zealand Anglican clergyman.
- Auseklis Ozols, 84, Latvian-born American painter, founder of the New Orleans Academy of Fine Arts, heart failure.
- Steve Reid, 69, American percussionist (The Rippingtons).
- Maria Samungi, 75, Romanian Olympic sprinter (1980).
- Mary Southin, 93–94, Canadian judge.
- Michel Thépénier, 80, French Olympic speed skater (1968).
- Rudolf Tomášek, 88, Czech Olympic pole vaulter (1960, 1964).
- Günter Twiesselmann, 100, German Olympic rower (1952).
- Beela Venkateshan, 56, Indian civil servant, brain cancer.

=== 25 ===
- Robert Barnett, 79, American attorney.
- Juraj Bartusz, 91, Slovak sculptor and academic (Technical University of Košice).
- Voddie Baucham, 56, American Reformed Baptist minister, author and educator (Founders Seminary).
- Ada Becchi, 88, Italian politician and economist, deputy (1987–1992).
- Jonas Biržiškis, 93, Lithuanian engineer and politician, minister of transport and communications (1990–1996).
- Ubiraci Rodrigues da Costa, 80, Brazilian table tennis player.
- Datchinamurthy Kataiah, 39, Malaysian convicted drug trafficker, execution by hanging.
- Chris Dreja, 78, English Hall of Fame guitarist (The Yardbirds), complications from multiple strokes and chronic obstructive pulmonary disease.
- Elina Haavio-Mannila, 93, Finnish social scientist.
- Brenda Itta, 81, American Iñupiaq activist and politician, member of the Alaska House of Representatives (1975–1977).
- Ernest Ivanter, 89, Russian academic, ecologist and zoologist.
- Jeffrey Alfred Legum, 83, American philanthropist.
- Blaine Milam, 35, American convicted murderer, execution by lethal injection.
- Jacques Mosseri, 89, Colombian architect.
- Balfour Mount, 86, Canadian physician and palliative care pioneer.
- Lucian Mureșan, 94, Romanian Greek Catholic cardinal, bishop of Maramureș (1990–1994), archbishop (1994–2005) and major archbishop (since 2005) of Făgăraș and Alba Iulia.
- Karen Olsen Beck, 95, Danish-born American-Costa Rican diplomat and politician, first lady of Costa Rica (1954–1958, 1970–1974) and MLA (1986–1990).
- Marty Prather, 67, American baseball superfan.
- Claude Raffestin, 89, Swiss geographer.
- Ronald Ramsey Sr., 66, American judge and politician, member of the Georgia State Senate (2007–2015).
- Carl Reese, 82, American college football coach (Missouri Tigers, East Carolina Pirates, Kansas Jayhawks).
- Alice Schwartz, 99, American businesswoman (Bio-Rad Laboratories).
- Kato Serwanga, 49, Ugandan-born American football player (New England Patriots, Washington Redskins, New York Giants).
- Assata Shakur, 78, American political activist and fugitive (Black Liberation Army).
- Billy Vigar, 21, English footballer (Chichester City), brain injury.
- Willem Anton van Vloten, 84, Dutch dermatologist (Utrecht University).

=== 26 ===
- David Berliner, 87, American educational psychologist.
- Ron Bowe, 85, Australian cricketer (Western Australia).
- Jim Bradley, 80, Canadian politician, Ontario MPP (1977–2018) and Niagara Regional Chair (since 2018), assisted suicide.
- Greg Brillantes, 92, Filipino writer, complications from a fall.
- Michèle Burke, 75, Irish-born Canadian makeup artist (Quest for Fire, Bram Stoker's Dracula, Interview with the Vampire), Oscar winner (1983, 1993).
- Menzies Campbell, Baron Campbell of Pittenweem, 84, British politician and Olympic sprinter (1964), MP (1987–2015), member of the House of Lords (since 2015), and chancellor of the University of St Andrews (since 2006).
- Chen Chien-jen, 86, Taiwanese diplomat and politician, MP (1993–1996), minister of foreign affairs (1999–2000), and representative to the United States (2000–2004).
- Christian, 82, Italian singer, cerebral haemorrhage.
- Alfredo Czerner, 91, Argentine Olympic rower (1952).
- JD Derbyshire, 36-37, Canadian theatre artist and comedian.
- Güllü, 51, Turkish singer, fall from a balcony.
- Tony Harrison, 88, English poet ("V").
- Ken Houghton, 85, English football player (Rotherham United, Hull City, Scunthorpe United) and manager.
- Tigran Keosayan, 59, Russian film director (Silver Lily of the Valley, Poor Sasha, The President and His Granddaughter), actor and television presenter.
- Martin Mansergh, 78, Irish political adviser and politician, senator (2002–2007) and TD (2007–2011), heart attack.
- Jim McNeely, 76, American jazz pianist, composer and arranger.
- Nand Lal Meena, 79, Indian politician, MP (1989–1991) and Rajasthan MLA (1998–2013).
- Otto G. Obermaier, 89, American attorney, U.S. attorney for the Southern District of New York (1989–1993).
- André Oumansky, 92, French actor (Marie Antoinette, The Spy, Babel).
- Saundra Herndon Oyewole, 82, American microbiologist, complications from Alzheimer's disease.
- Pasquale Pistorio, 89, Italian semiconductor industry executive, CEO of STMicroelectronics (1980–2005).
- Bobby Reed, 85, American football player (Minnesota Vikings, Winnipeg Blue Bombers, Toronto Argonauts).
- Paul Roberts, 52, English choreographer, cancer.
- Ann Robinson, 96, American actress (The War of the Worlds, Dragnet, Fury).
- Esa Saario, 93, Finnish actor (Akseli and Elina, Here, Beneath the North Star).
- Alexander Strizhakov, 88, Russian scientist.
- Amilcar Tanuri, 67, Brazilian epidemiologist.
- Henky Timisela, 87, Indonesian footballer (Persib Bandung, national team).
- Dorota Tlałka-Mogore, 62, Polish-French Olympic alpine skier (1984, 1988).

=== 27 ===
- Shirley Abicair, 96, Australian-born British singer, actress (One Good Turn) and television personality (Shirley Abicair in Australia).
- Walt Brown, 88, American creationist.
- Chang Chun-hsiung, 87, Taiwanese politician, premier (2000–2002, 2007–2008), vice premier (2000, 2008), and twice MP.
- Gerald Crough, 87, Australian footballer (South Melbourne).
- John Dougherty, 94, Australian rugby league player (South Sydney, NSW City, New South Wales).
- Jean-Michel Ferrand, 83, French politician, deputy (1988–2012).
- Sir William Francis, 99, British civil engineer.
- Keith Gorman, 46, Irish Gaelic footballer (O'Dwyers, Newtown, Dublin), pancreatic cancer.
- Franz Grundheber, 88, German baritone (Hamburg State Opera, Vienna State Opera).
- Pat Hale, 88, American politician, member of the Washington State Senate (1994–2004).
- Gerfried Hodschar, 80, Austrian footballer (Grazer AK, national team).
- Clyde A. Hutchison III, 86, American biochemist and microbiologist.
- Louis Lambert, 84, American politician, member of the Louisiana State Senate (1972–1974, 1994–2004), liver cancer.
- Ray Lane, 95, American sportscaster (Detroit Tigers, Detroit Red Wings, WJBK-TV), complications from a fall.
- Myron Lowery, 78, American politician, mayor of Memphis (2009).
- Martin Neary, 85, English organist and choral conductor (Westminster Abbey, Winchester Cathedral), complications from Parkinson's disease.
- Russell M. Nelson, 101, American religious leader and surgeon, president of the Church of Jesus Christ of Latter-day Saints (since 2018).
- Arthur Obel, 76, Kenyan immunologist.
- Enzo Osella, 86, Italian racing driver and team owner.
- Irwin Rovner, 84, American archaeologist.
- Georg Stefan Troller, 103, Austrian-born French journalist (ZDF), screenwriter and director.

=== 28 ===
- José Araquistáin, 88, Spanish footballer (Real Madrid, Real Sociedad, national team).
- Yavuz Bülent Bâkiler, 89, Turkish poet, writer and journalist.
- Alison Drower, 61, Australian television and radio presenter (MTV Australia and New Zealand, Triple M Sydney, Southern Cross Austereo), complications from cancer.
- Michael B. Druxman, 84, American screenwriter (Dillinger and Capone, Keaton's Cop, Cheyenne Warrior).
- Sir Terry Farrell, 87, British architect and urban designer.
- Airton Garcia, 75, Brazilian politician and entrepreneur, mayor (2017–2024) and vice mayor (1997–2000) of São Carlos, cardiac arrest.
- Javier García, 78, Spanish Olympic handball player (1972).
- Wolfgang Helfrich, 93, German physicist and inventor.
- Theodore L. Hullar, 90, American academic administrator, chancellor of the University of California, Riverside (1985–1987) and University of California, Davis (1987–1994).
- Mika Immonen, 52, Finnish pool player, colorectal cancer.
- Gerry Inglis, 71, Canadian football player (BC Lions, Winnipeg Blue Bombers). (death announced on this date)
- Jan Willem Klop, 79, Dutch mathematician.
- Sébastien Lakou, 78, Congolese footballer (Étoile du Congo, national team).
- Henrique Lins de Barros, 78, Brazilian researcher (Alberto Santos-Dumont).
- Roger Lukaku, 58, Congolese footballer (Boom, Seraing, national team).
- Alfie MacLeod, 69, Canadian politician, member (1995–1998, 2006–2019) and speaker (2007–2009) of the Nova Scotia House of Assembly, cancer.
- Olav Marås, 94, Norwegian politician, MP (1965–1977).
- Robert Maxson, 89, American academic administrator, president of UNLV (1984–1994), CSULB (1994–2006) and Sierra Nevada University (2007–2010).
- Vaughn Miller, 64, Bahamian politician, MP (since 2017).
- Marcyliena Morgan, 75, American linguistic anthropologist.
- Richard D. North, 79, British conservative commentator.
- Francis Thombe Nyammo, 86, Kenyan politician, MP (2007–2013).
- Parry Osayande, 88, Nigerian police officer.
- Bob Print, 81, American football player (San Diego Chargers, Edmonton Eskimos).
- Carlo Sassi, 95, Italian journalist.
- Jean-Louis Vieillard-Baron, 81, French philosopher.

=== 29 ===
- Adriana Aizemberg, 86, Argentine actress (La Raulito, Plata dulce, Buenos Aires 100 km).
- Karl Augustesen, 80, Danish astronomer.
- Katharine Barnwell, 87, British missionary.
- Aleksandr Bushkov, 69, Russian writer.
- Yury Chernavsky, 78, Russian composer and songwriter.
- Bahman Choubi-asl, Iranian database specialist and spy, executed.
- Margaret DePriest, 94, American television writer (Days of Our Lives, General Hospital, Where the Heart Is) and actress.
- Nurul Majid Mahmud Humayun, 74, Bangladeshi politician, minister of industries (2019–2024) and MP (2009–2024).
- Jabir Imanov, 49, Azerbaijani actor, heart attack.
- Boris Kochelaev, 91, Russian physicist.
- Vitaly Korotich, 89, Russian writer and journalist (Vsesvit, Ogoniok).
- Elijah Lagat, 59, Kenyan Olympic marathon runner (2000) and politician.
- Jørgen Leth, 88, Danish filmmaker (A Sunday in Hell, The Perfect Human, The Five Obstructions).
- Berta Loran, 99, Polish-born Brazilian actress (Amor com Amor Se Paga, Você Decide, Ti Ti Ti).
- John Lucas, 88, British poet, critic and publisher. (death announced on this date)
- Somtochukwu Maduagwu, 29, Nigerian lawyer, model and news anchor.
- George McCauley, 95, Canadian Olympic rower (1952).
- Alan McDonald, 74, Scottish parish minister, moderator of the General Assembly of the Church of Scotland (2006–2007).
- Nathi Mthethwa, 58, South African politician and diplomat, minister of sport, arts and culture (2019–2023), fall.
- Patrick Murray, 68, English actor (Only Fools and Horses, Scum, Quadrophenia), lung cancer.
- Gennady Nilov, 88, Russian actor (Three Plus Two, Footprint in the Ocean, Mission in Kabul).
- Brian Patten, 79, English poet and author.
- Pipiet Senja, 68, Indonesian writer.
- Dragan Popović, 84, Yugoslav-born American soccer player (Hajduk Split, St. Louis Stars, Kansas City Spurs) and coach.
- Abbey Rader, 81, American jazz drummer.
- Javier Sánchez, 77, Mexican footballer (Cruz Azul, América, national team).
- Yashwant Sardeshpande, 62, Indian filmmaker, cardiac arrest.
- Vojislav Simić, 101, Serbian musician, conductor and composer.
- Lally Weymouth, 82, American journalist (The Washington Post), pancreatic cancer.

=== 30 ===
- Joshua Allen, 36, American dancer (So You Think You Can Dance) and actor, hit by train.
- Alan Armitage, 95, English cricketer (Oxford University, Nottinghamshire).
- Renato Casaro, 89, Italian film poster artist (My Name Is Nobody, Conan the Barbarian, Octopussy), bronchopneumonia.
- Wyatt Durrette, 87, American attorney and politician, member of Virginia House of Delegates (1972–1978).
- Susan Griffin, 82, American writer.
- Pablo Guerrero, 78, Spanish singer-songwriter, lung cancer.
- Alan Huckleberry, 84, American mathematician.
- Nobuo Kubota, 93, Canadian multimedia artist.
- Nigel Latta, 58, New Zealand psychologist, author, and broadcaster (Beyond the Darklands, The Politically Incorrect Parenting Show, Nigel Latta Blows Stuff Up), cancer.
- Vijay Kumar Malhotra, 93, Indian politician, MP (1989–2008) and Delhi MLA (2008–2013).
- Lawrence Moten, 53, American basketball player (Syracuse Orange, Vancouver Grizzlies, Washington Wizards).
- Detlef Neukirch, 85, German chess player.
- Takako Saito, 96, Japanese artist.
- Barry Schmidt, 81, Australian footballer (Carlton).
- Soo Catwoman, 70, British actress, model and fashion icon.
- William Thomas, 89, British historian.
- Bob Van Reeth, 82, Belgian architect.
- Cor Vos, 77, Dutch photographer.
- Bernard Widrow, 95, American electrical engineer.
- Birgitte Wilbek, 96, Danish handball and basketball player.
- Nigel S. Wright, 62, Canadian private equity executive and attorney, chief of staff to the prime minister (2011–2013).
