= Paul Johns (activist) =

British activist

Paul Johns (13 Mar 1934 – 14 Oct 2026) was a British activist and Methodist lay preacher who served as chair of the Campaign for Nuclear Disarmament (CND) between 1985 and 1987.

== Early life ==
Born on 13th March 1934 in Woking, Surrey, Johns was educated at Kingswood School before going on to study History at the University of Oxford. While at Oxford he became interested in the struggle against apartheid and in 1956 he became a founding member of the university's Joint Action Committee Against Racial Intolerance (JACARI).

After graduating Johns worked as a management consultant and personnel manager at Dunlop.

He was married to Ruth Johns and they had three children together before divorcing.

== Activism ==
In the 1980s Johns became active in the peace movement, first as Chair of Christian CND, the faith-based wing of the nuclear disarmament campaign, and then, for two years, of CND as a whole, succeeding Joan Ruddock.

The media described his victory as taking the CND by surprise and attributed it to his association with the grassroots due to his direct involvement in civil disobedience campaigns.

Under his chairmanship of Christian CND the group held the Peace Pentecost event in 1983 at the US Air Force base in Upper Heyford, Oxfordshire, where protestors gathered to demonstrate against the stationing of nuclear weapons amidst heightened Cold War tensions.

== Traidcraft ==
Johns served as the managing director of UK fair trade organisation Traidcraft in the 1990s, where he advocated for a fair wage for producers in developing economies. Under his tenure, Traidcraft co-founded the Fairtrade Foundation which led to the roll out of the UK Fairtrade Mark.

== Preaching and storytelling ==
Johns was a Methodist lay preacher who contributed to BBC 4's "Thought for the Day". His book, September 11th and After: 20 Parables For Our Time was published by John Hunt Publishing and reflects on the moral, spiritual, and geopolitical fallout of the September 11 attacks.

He was director of the College of Preachers from September 2006 to 2013.
