= Jean-Pierre Kuskowiak =

French footballer (1949–2025)

Personal information
- Date of birth: 21 July 1949
- Place of birth: Fresnes-sur-Escaut, France
- Date of death: 19 September 2025 (aged 76)
- Height: 1.73 m (5 ft 8 in)
- Position: Centre-back

Youth career
- ?–1967: Stade Fresnois

Senior career*
Years	Team	Apps	(Gls)
1967–1972	Valenciennes		
1972–1973	Nancy		
1973–1978	Valenciennes		
1978–1979	Melun		
- * Club domestic league appearances and goals

Jean-Pierre Kuskowiak (French: [ʒɑ̃ pjɛʁ kuskɔvjak]; 21 July 1949 – 19 September 2025) was a French footballer who played as a centre-back.

Kuskowiak played for Valenciennes, Nancy, and Melun, winning Division 2 in 1972 with Valenciennes.

Kuskowiak died on 19 September 2025, at the age of 76.
