= Ubiraci Rodrigues da Costa =

Brazilian table tennis player (1945–2025)

Personal information
- Born: 26 June 1945 São Paulo, Brazil
- Died: 25 September 2025 (aged 80) São Paulo, Brazil

Sport
- Sport: Table tennis

Ubiraci Rodrigues da Costa (26 June 1945 – 25 September 2025), also known as Biriba, was a Brazilian table tennis player. He competed at the 1959, 1961 and 1963 World Table Tennis Championships.

Costa died on 25 September 2025, at the age of 80.
