= Ernest Ivanter =

Russian academic, ecologist and zoologist (1935–2025)

- Эрнест Ивантер
- Born: Ernest Viktorovich Ivanter; 15 November 1935; Moscow, Russian SFSR, Soviet Union
- Died: 25 September 2025 (aged 89); Petrozavodsk, Russia
- Education: Russian State Agrarian University
- Occupations: Academic; ecologist; zoologist

Ernest Viktorovich Ivanter (Russian: Эрнест Викторович Ивантер; 15 November 1935 – 25 September 2025) was a Russian academic, ecologist and zoologist. A member of the Russian Academy of Sciences, he was a recipient of the Order of Honour (2005).

Ivanter died in Petrozavodsk on 25 September 2025, at the age of 89.
