= Wally Warning =

Aruban reggae musician (died 2025)

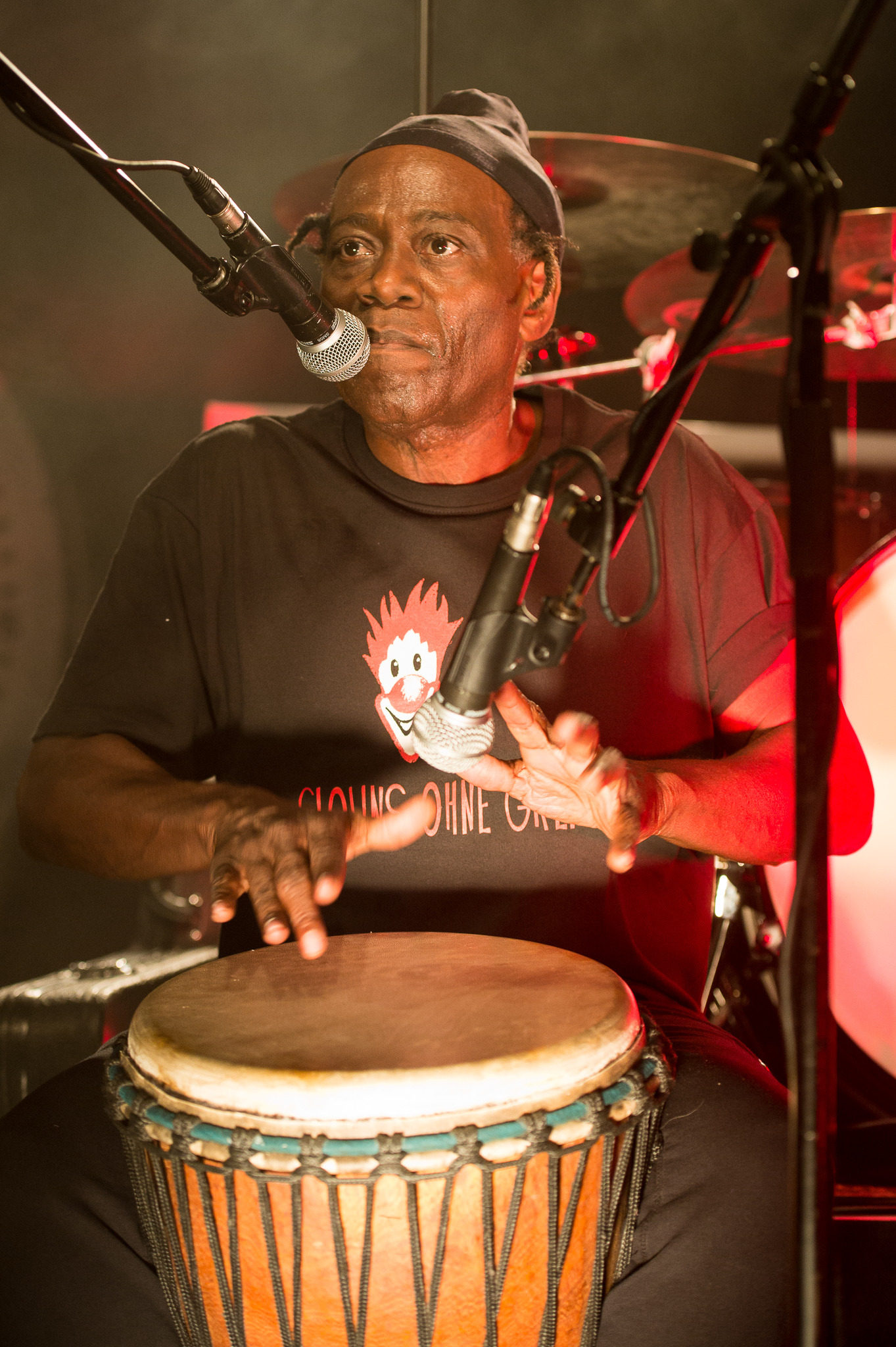
Wally Warning, 2016

Ewald "Wally" Warning (died 19 September 2025) was an Aruban roots reggae, ragga, gospel and Latin singer who lived in Munich, Germany.

== Life and career ==
Warning was born in Aruba, Netherlands Antilles. He was the son of Surinamese parents. At the age of 17 he moved from Aruba to the Netherlands where he had a hit single with "The World Needs Love" in the early 1980s and around 1990 to Germany. He put his singing career on hold while he played bass guitar in touring bands with Sam & Dave and Lightnin' Hopkins, but restarted his solo career in the 2000s. He reached a broad audience when he produced and sang the radio summer hit "No Monkey". The song reached the top thirty in both Austria and Germany. Warning died on 19 September 2025.

== Discography ==
=== Maxi-singles ===
- 1983: Promises
- 1984: Land of Hunger
- 2003: Cosa Linda
- 2007: No Monkey
- 2008: Hand in Hand
- 2008: un Amor
- 2010: Lo Que Busco
- 2011: positive
- 2011: one drop Reggae
- 2014: the world needs Love
- 2015: success
- 2016: Abrázame
- 2018: Live to Love
- 2019: Do it

=== Albums ===
- Tax
- 1992: Promises
- 1995: Love Can Save Us
- 1997: Storm
- 1998: Hope
- 1999: Reggae Vibe
- 2004: Who Am I
- 2005: Spiritual Soul
- 2005: Reggae Vibe II
- 2006: Slow Down
- 2007: No Monkey
- 2008: Hope (Gospel album)
- 2009: Take life
- 2010: Closer (Gospel album)
- 2010: Aya
- 2012: Mama Nature
- 2013: Dushi Ritmo
- 2015: Footsteps
