= Charly Oleg =

French musician, composer and conductor (1931–2025)

- Born: Charles Olejniczak; 7 August 1931; Hayange, France
- Died: 8 September 2025 (aged 94); Le Blanc-Mesnil, France
- Education: Regional Conservatoire of Metz
- Occupations: Musician; Composer; Orchestra conductor

Charles Olejniczak (7 August 1931 – 8 September 2025), better known by the stage name Charly Oleg, was a French organist, pianist, composer and orchestra conductor.

== Life and career ==
Born in Hayange on 7 August 1931 into a family with Polish origins, Olejniczak grew up in Nilvange. He attended the Regional Conservatoire of Metz and was a pianist for the French Armed Forces during his military service. At the age of 20, he accompanied Josephine Baker on a tour through London and took over when she got sick. He later worked with Mireille Mathieu and Charles Aznavour.

On 27 February 1970, Olejniczak appeared on the television show Télé Dimanche on ORTF Television. From 1979 to 1982, he was the head conductor at the Théâtre de la Renaissance and directed opérettes such as Dédé alongside Georges Guétary, Maria Candido, José Todaro. In 1988, he held a small role in the film The Unbearable Lightness of Being. In 1998, he had an uncredited role in Ça n'empêche pas les sentiments.

Charly Oleg died in Le Blanc-Mesnil on 8 September 2025, at the age of 94.

== Albums ==
- Musique douce n°3 (1957)
- Les Plus Belles Mélodies de “Tournez Manège” (1992)
- Variations personnelles (2007)
