= Nazim Baykishiyev =

Azerbaijani artist (1948–2025)

- Nazim Bəykişiyev
- Born: 29 June 1948; Baku, Azerbaijan SSR, Soviet Union
- Died: 8 September 2025 (aged 77)
- Occupation: Painter
- Awards: Honored Artist of Azerbaijan State Prize of the Azerbaijan SSR

Nazim Zohrab oghlu Baykishiyev (Azerbaijani: Nazim Zöhrab oğlu Bəykişiyev; 29 June 1948 – 8 September 2025) was an Azerbaijani artist and stage designer. He was appointed the People's Artist of Azerbaijan in 2006.

== Life and career ==
Nazim Baykishiyev worked at the Baku State Art Gallery after graduating from the painting faculty of the Azim Azimzade Art School. In 1970–1975, he entered the theater artist faculty of the Russian Institute of Theatre Arts in Moscow and studied in the class of People's Artist of the USSR Sergey Obraztsov. After graduating from that educational institution, he worked as a stage designer at the Puppet Theater and the Russian Drama Theater in Ordzhonikidze. Later, he worked as a stage designer and chief artist at the Sumgait State Musical Drama Theater, the Azerbaijan State Academic Theatre of Musical Comedy, and the Azerbaijan State Theatre of Young Spectators.

Beginning in 2001, he was the chief artist of the Azerbaijan State Academic National Drama Theatre.

Baykishiyev died from lung cancer on 8 September 2025, at the age of 77.

== Awards ==
- State Prize of the Azerbaijan SSR — 1984
- Honored Artist of Azerbaijan — 30 May 2002
- People's Artist of Azerbaijan — 29 December 2006
