= Michael O'Connor (priest) =

Anglican dean in New Zealand (1942–2025)

Brian Michael O'Connor (20 June 1942 – 24 September 2025) was an Anglican clergyman in New Zealand who was the Dean of Auckland from 1997 to 2000.

== Biography ==
O'Connor was born on 20 June 1942, and educated at St Catharine's College, Cambridge. He studied for the priesthood at Ripon College Cuddesdon and was ordained in 1969. His firstpost was a curacy in Headington. After this he was Priest in charge at Merton, Oxfordshire then Vicar of Rainham, Kent (and also Rural Dean of Gillingham). O'Connor died on 24 September 2025, at the age of 83.
