= Jelica Kurjak =

Serbian diplomat (1952–2025)

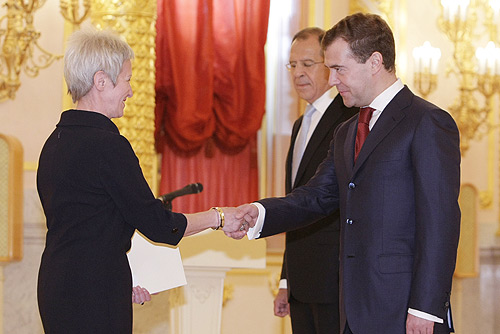
- Kurjak presenting her letters of credence to Dmitri Medvedev in 2009
- Born: 17 September 1952; Belgrade, Yugoslavia
- Died: 5 September 2025 (aged 72)

Jelica Kurjak (Serbian: Јелица Курјак; 17 September 1952 – 5 September 2025) was a Serbian diplomat who served as the Ambassador Extraordinary and Plenipotentiary of the Republic of Serbia to the Russian Federation.

Kurjak was born in Belgrade in September 1952. She died on 5 September 2025 at the age of 73.
