= Bahman Choubi-asl =

Iranian database specialist (died 2025)

Bahman Choubi-asl (died 29 September 2025) was an Iranian database specialist. He was convicted of espionage with Israel's Mossad by the republic's judiciary and hanged in Ghezel Hesar prison on 29 September 2025. He was described as "one of the most important spies" for Israel.

According to Iran International, "The judiciary said Choubi-asl met Mossad agents in nine foreign trips, held dozens of meetings, and received financial rewards and training."
