= Johnnie J. Young =

American politician (1938–2025)

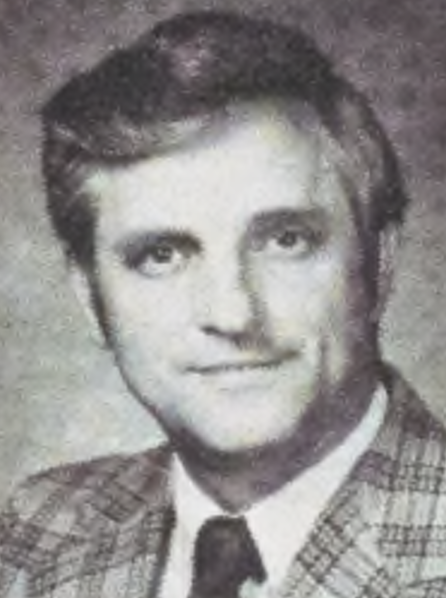
- Young in 1978

Member of the South Carolina House of Representatives from the 107th district
- In office 1977–1978
- Preceded by: John C. Heinemann
- Succeeded by: Robert L. Altman

Personal details
- Born: Johnnie Joseph Young; February 4, 1938 Georgetown, South Carolina, U.S.
- Died: September 12, 2025 (aged 87) Georgetown, South Carolina, U.S.
- Party: Republican

Johnnie Joseph Young (February 4, 1938 – September 12, 2025) was an American politician. A member of the Republican Party, he served in the South Carolina House of Representatives from 1977 to 1978.

== Life and career ==
Young was born in Georgetown, South Carolina on February 4, 1938, the son of Henry Young Sr. and Hazel West. He attended and graduated from Winyah High School. After graduating, he attended Clemson University, but did not graduate, which after attending Clemson, he served in the National Guard for ten years. After his discharge, he operated his own trucking company in his hometown.

Young served in the South Carolina House of Representatives from 1977 to 1978.

== Personal life and death ==
In 1961, Young married Linda Gail Mincey. Their marriage lasted until Young's death in 2025.

Young died at his home in Georgetown, South Carolina, on September 12, 2025, at the age of 87.
