= Merica (footballer) =

Brazilian footballer (1953–2025)

Personal information
- Full name: Valdemiro Lima da Silva
- Date of birth: 13 September 1953
- Place of birth: Santo Amaro, Bahia, Brazil
- Date of death: 13 September 2025 (aged 72)
- Place of death: Alagoinhas, Bahia, Brazil
- Position: Defensive midfielder

Youth career
- Ferroviário (Alagoinhas)
- Ideal (Santo Amaro)

Senior career*
Years	Team	Apps	(Gls)
1973–1974	Atlético de Alagoinhas		
1975–1978	Flamengo	182	(9)
1978	Bahia		
1979	America-RJ		
1980–1984	Sport Recife		
1984–1985	Nacional-AM		
1985	Confiança		
1986	Rio Negro-AM		
1986–1988	Confiança		
- * Club domestic league appearances and goals

Valdemiro Lima da Silva (13 September 1953 – 13 September 2025), better known as Merica, was a Brazilian professional footballer who played as a defensive midfielder.

== Career ==
A defensive midfielder, Merica began his career in the city of Alagoinhas, first as an amateur with Ferroviário and then as a professional with Atlético de Alagoinhas. In 1976 he was hired by Flamengo where he made 182 appearances. It was said that he played like two players, due to his application and intensity in defensive system. He later returned to the northeast, where he was state champion for Bahia, Sport Recife and Confiança.

== Death ==
Merica died in Alagoinhas, Bahia, Brazil on 13 September 2025, at the age of 72.

== Honours ==
Flamengo

- Torneio Quadrangular de Jundiaí: 1975
- Taça Geraldo Cleofas Dias Alves: 1976
- Taça Cidade de São Paulo: 1976
- Taça Governador Elmo Cerejo: 1976
- Taça Nelson Rodrigues: 1976
- Taça Duque de Caxias: 1976
- Troféu Antonio Valmir Campelo Bezerra: 1977

Bahia

- Campeonato Baiano: 1978

Sport Recife

- Campeonato Pernambucano: 1980, 1981, 1982

Confiança

- Campeonato Sergipano: 1986, 1988
