= Kenneth Margerison =

American historian (1946–2025)

- Born: Kenneth Hilton Margerison Jr. March 22, 1946; Philadelphia, Pennsylvania, U.S.
- Died: September 9, 2025 (aged 79)
- Education: University of North Carolina at Chapel Hill; Duke University
- Occupation: Historian

Kenneth Hilton Margerison Jr. (March 22, 1946 – September 9, 2025) was an American historian.

== Early life and career ==
Margerison was born in Philadelphia, Pennsylvania, on March 22, 1946, the son of Kenneth Hilton Margerison Sr. and Edythe Florence Helmuth. He attended and graduated from Frank L. Ashley High School. After graduating, he attended the University of North Carolina at Chapel Hill, earning his AB degree in history in 1967. He also attended Duke University, earning his master's degree in 1969 and his PhD degree in 1973.

Margerison served as a professor in the department of history at Texas State University from 1973 to 2022. During his years as a professor, in 2013, he was named the Minnie Stevens Piper Professor, and was named a distinguished professor in 2022.

== Personal life and death ==
In 1967, Margerison married Mary Patricia Stacy. Their marriage lasted until Margerison's death in 2025.

Margerison died on September 9, 2025, at the age of 79.
