= Mario de Jesús Pérez Jiménez =

Spanish computer scientist and academic (1948–2025)

Mario de Jesús Pérez Jiménez (13 November 1948 – 17 September 2025) was a Spanish computer scientist and academic. He was member of the Academia Europaea. Pérez Jiménez died on 17 September 2025, at the age of 76.
