= Rodney Godshall =

American operatic singer (1944–2025)

- Born: May 26, 1944; Quakertown, Pennsylvania, U.S.
- Died: September 18, 2025 (aged 81); Düsseldorf, Germany
- Education: Indiana University; Juilliard School
- Occupation: Operatic bass

Rodney Godshall (May 26, 1944 – September 18, 2025) was an American operatic bass. Born in Quakertown, Pennsylvania, he was educated at Indiana University and Juilliard School. He began his career at the Santa Fe Opera in the 1960s and later performed with the Seattle Opera, New York City Opera, and Washington Opera, before relocating to Germany to perform there. According to Opera, his characters included Sarastro, Osmin, King Philip, Padre Guardiano, Prince Gremin, Timur, Daland and Gurnemanz. He died in Düsseldorf, at age 81.
