= Viktor Šlajchrt =

Czech writer, poet, journalist and editor (1952–2025)

Viktor Šlajchrt (30 April 1952 – 4 September 2025) was a Czech writer, poet, journalist and editor.

== Life and career ==
Born in Prague on 30 April 1952, he trained as a teacher and taught for several years. He then worked as a book salesman in a used book store, as a subway cleaner, and in sales. He eventually landed at the publisher Odeon working in sales and marketing, before transitioning to journalism full time after 1992. As a journalist, he worked first at the newspaper Mladá fronta Dnes and then at the weekly news magazine Respekt in its culture section until 2008.

Šlajchrt was a contributor to the Revolver Revue and Lidové noviny. From 1997 to 2001, he maintained on online diary that was one of the first Czech blogs. Šlajchrt was the author of a number of books.

He received the Ferdinand Dobrotivý Award in 2011.

Šlajchrt retired from full-time work in 2008, but continued to write. He died on 4 September 2025, at the age of 73.

== Bibliography ==
- Pomalý pohyb (1998)
- Suroviny laskominy (2000)
- Srdečný pozdrav z hospody (2007)
- Putování pomezím (2008)
- Bankrot (2011)
- Jedna věta (2012)
- Okamžiky umění (2013)
- Bonvivánova kulinária (2015)
- Obrazy Prahy (2017)
- Bloumání epochami (2018)
- Josef Jíra 1929 - 2005 (2022)
