= T. J. Chung =

North Korean-born American mechanical engineer (1929–2025)

- Born: Tae Jung Chung; May 20, 1929; Sunchon, Korea, Empire of Japan
- Died: September 23, 2025 (aged 96); Huntsville, Alabama, U.S.
- Education: Seoul National University; Oklahoma State University
- Occupation: Engineer
- Spouse: Wharan Kim

Tae Jung Chung (May 20, 1929 – September 23, 2025) was a North Korean-born American mechanical engineer.

== Early life and career ==
Chung was born in Sunchon, Korea, Empire of Japan, the son of Goo Taek Chung and Hae Sook Kim. He attended Seoul National University, earning his engineering diploma in 1949. In his thirties, he emigrated to the United States. After emigrating, he attended Oklahoma State University, earning his MS degree in 1961 and his PhD degree in applied mechanics in 1964.

Chung served as a professor in the department of mechanical and aerospace engineering at the University of Alabama in Huntsville from 1970 to 2009. During his years as a professor, in 1990, he was named a distinguished professor by the University of Alabama Board of Trustees.

== Personal life and death ==
Chung was married to Wharan Kim. Their marriage lasted until Chung's death in 2025.

Chung died in Huntsville, Alabama, on September 23, 2025, at the age of 96.
