= Alfred E. Hierold =

German theologian (1941–2025)

Alfred Egid Hierold (29 December 1941 – 3 September 2025) was a German Roman Catholic clergyman, theologian and canon lawyer and rector of the University of Bamberg.

== Biography ==
Hierold was born in Vohenstrauß on 29 December 1941. After graduating from high school, he studied theology at the University of Regensburg and LMU Munich. After his ordination to the priesthood on 29 June 1967 in Regensburg and a period as a chaplain in Eggenfelden (1967–1968), Hierold obtained a licentiate in canon law on 20 February 1975, followed by his doctorate on 23 February 1978 on the topic of "Foundation and Organization of Church Caritas: with Special Consideration of German Particular Church Law". On 1 April 1980, he began teaching at the University of Bamberg, initially as a substitute for the retired Othmar Heggelbacher, whom he succeeded as a full professor on 1 March 1981 to the chair of canon law.

There, Hierold turned to university politics. On 1 October 1983, he became Dean of the Faculty of Catholic Theology for the first time (until 1985). He was Vice-President of the University from 18 March 1989 to 30 September 1991 and Rector of the University from 1 April 1992 to 30 April 2000. His term of office was marked by the further expansion of the institution, which was only re-elevated to university status in 1979. From 1 October 2000 to 30 September 2002, Hierold was again Dean of the Faculty of Catholic Theology. At the Benedict XVI Philosophical-Theological College in Heiligenkreuz, he taught canon law from 1983 to 2017 as a visiting professor, later as a full professor.

In addition to the university, Hierold took on other tasks in the Catholic Church: From 1 February 1983 he was vice-official of the Archdiocese of Bamberg, and from 1985 he was a member of the Missio Commission of the Archdiocese of Bamberg. Since 27 September 2001, he had advised Commission XIII of the German Bishops' Conference, which is responsible for Caritas. From 2001 he was a member of the Scientific Council of the Catholic Academy in Bavaria. Within the framework of the Bologna Process, he was a member of the Commission of the Congregation for Catholic Education from 28 October 2003 and at the same time advised the German bishops on this matter. In doing so, he combined church and university political commitment.

From 2002 to 2006, he was chairman of the Working Group for Canon Law in Germany. From 1 July 2005, Hierold was a judge at the Ecclesiastical Labour Court (KAGH) in Bonn. From 12 June 2002, he was a member of the Commission for the Study of Military Chaplaincy and from 2010 a member of the Board of Directors of the Catholic Soldiers' Chaplaincy. From 2004, he was president of the Association of Friends of the Vatican Secret Archives. From 16 September 2008, he was chairman of the Agency for Quality Assurance and Accreditation of Canonical Degree Programmes in Germany (AKAST).

Hierold was involved in numerous social projects in the Holy Land. He was admitted to the Equestrian Order of the Holy Sepulchre of Jerusalem in 1989 by the Cardinal Grand Master Giuseppe Caprio and invested in the Papal Lay Order on 20 May 1989 in Mainz Cathedral by the Grand Prior Franz Cardinal Hengsbach. He was prior of the Bamberg Commandery of the Order of Knights until 2016; Josef Zerndl succeeded him.

In addition to many other civic commitments, Hierold has been an honorary member of the Catholic student fraternity KDStV Fredericia Bamberg (1995) and the student fraternity Capitolina in Rome since 1995, both in the CV. He was chairman of the Association of Friends of the "collegium oecumenicum" (2010) and a member of the supervisory board of the Kolping Educational Institute in the Archdiocese of Bamberg (2010).

Hierold died on 3 September 2025, at the age of 83.
