= Tess Johnston =

American diplomat and author (1931–2025)

- Born: September 17, 1931; Charlotte, North Carolina, U.S.
- Died: September 14, 2025 (aged 93); Washington, D.C., U.S.

Tess Johnston (September 17, 1931 – September 14, 2025) was an American author and foreign service specialist. During her time in Shanghai, she became interested in architecture and partnered with Chinese photographer Erh Dongqiang. Over the course of her career, she authored or co-authored over two dozen books and became a leading expert in the colonial architecture of Shanghai.

== Life and career ==
Johnston was born in Charlotte, North Carolina, on September 17, 1931. She grew up in Charlottesville, Virginia, and joined the Foreign Service in 1953. In addition to Shanghai, she was also posted in East Berlin, New Delhi, Tehran, and Paris. While working for the American consulate in Düsseldorf, Germany, she became interested in old buildings. After returning to the US, she went on to college at the University of Virginia. She received a bachelor's degree in education in 1961 and a master's in German in 1963. In 1964, she received a master’s degree from the College of William and Mary.

Johnston came to Shanghai in 1981, then working as a foreign service specialist at the U.S. consulate. She worked as a secretary under seven Consuls General, noting in 2016 that "I always liked the position of secretary because it was all the fun and none of the responsibility". She was subject to fewer restrictions than diplomats, allowing her to explore the city more freely; she particularly enjoyed shopping at the antiques markets on Sunday mornings. She became interested in the city's Western-style architecture, and began documenting it with Chinese photographer Erh Dongqiang. The pair published more than two dozen books. Their first book, published in 1993, was A Last Look: Western Architecture in Old Shanghai. It has been credited with being the first book to highlight old European-style architecture in the city, known as China's "Paris of the East."

Following her retirement in 1996, Johnston lived in Shanghai for the next 20 years, continuing her personal research and leading walking tours. In 2016, she returned to the United States, having spent more than 30 years in Shanghai. After returning to the U.S., she settled in Washington, D.C. She donated some of the many materials she had collected over her time in Shanghai to the Hoover Institution (Johnston (Tess) papers, 1929-2014) and the Royal Asiatic Society Library. Johnston died from complications of COVID-19 in Washington, D.C., on September 14, 2025, three days before her 94th birthday.

== Books ==
- A Last Look: Western Architecture in Old Shanghai (1993)
- The Last Colonies: Western Architecture in China's Southern Treaty Ports. Old China Hand Press. 1997. LCCN 2005365009.
- Final Five Shanghai Walks: The Where's Where of the Who’s Who of Old Shanghai (2016)

=== Memoirs ===
- Permanently Temporary: From Berlin to Shanghai in Half a Century
- A War Away: An American Woman in Vietnam, 1967-1974 (2018)
