= Andrew R. Neureuther =

American electrical engineer (1941–2025)

- Born: Andrew Richard Neureuther; July 30, 1941; Decatur, Illinois, U.S.
- Died: September 9, 2025 (aged 84); California, U.S.
- Education: University of Illinois Urbana-Champaign
- Occupation: Electrical engineer
- Spouse(s): Beverly Joyce Hufford (m. 1962; div. 1970) Cynthia Collins (m. 1979)

Andrew Richard Neureuther (July 30, 1941 – September 9, 2025) was an American electrical engineer.

== Early life and career ==
Neureuther was born in Decatur, Illinois on July 30, 1941, the son of Andrew Wesley Neureuther and Mary Tuschhoff. He attended the University of Illinois Urbana-Champaign, earning his BS degree in 1963, his MS degree in 1964 and his PhD degree in electrical engineering in 1966.

Neureuther served as a professor in the department of electrical engineering and computer science at the University of California, Berkeley from 1966 to 2007. During his years as a professor, in 1998, he was named the Rockwell distinguished professor.

== Personal life and death ==
In 1962, Neureuther married Beverly Joyce Hufford. Their marriage ended in divorce in 1970. He then married Cynthia Collins in 1979. Their marriage lasted until Neureuther's death in 2025.

Neureuther died in California on September 9, 2025, at the age of 84.
