= René Tendron =

French journalist (1934–2025)

- Born: 8 March 1934
- Died: 7 September 2025 (aged 91)
- Occupation: Journalist

René Tendron (French: [ʁəne tɑ̃dʁɔ̃]; 8 March 1934 – 7 September 2025) was a French journalist who specialised in economics.

== Life and career ==
Born on 8 March 1934, Tendron wrote several books on economics, including Dossier F comme financiers and the "Guides Tendron". He was also the longtime Paris Bourse correspondent for the TF1 show Journal de 13 heures, hosted by Yves Mourousi.

Tendron died on 7 September 2025, at the age of 91.

== Works ==
- Dossier F comme financiers (1981)
- Le Guide de votre argent mille neuf cent quatre-vingt-cinq (1985)
- Le Guide de votre argent mille neuf cent quatre-vingt-six (1986)
- Le Guide de votre argent mille neuf cent quatre-vingt-sept (1987)
- Avez-vous pensé à votre succession ? (1989)
- Le Guide Tendron mille neuf cent quatre-vingt-neuf (1989)
- Que faire pour tirer parti de mes économies ? (1989)
- Le Guide de votre argent mille neuf cent quatre-vingt-dix (1990)
- Le Guide de votre argent mille neuf cent quatre-vingt-onze (1991)
- Le Guide de votre argent mille neuf cent quatre-vingt-douze (1992)
- Le Guide de votre argent mille neuf cent quatre-vingt-treize (1993)
- Le Guide Tendron de votre argent mille neuf cent quatre-vingt-quinze (1995)
- Le Guide Tendron de votre argent mille neuf cent quatre-vingt-seize (1996)

== Decorations ==
- Officer of the Legion of Honour (1989)
