= Gaines C. Granade =

American politician (1934–2025)

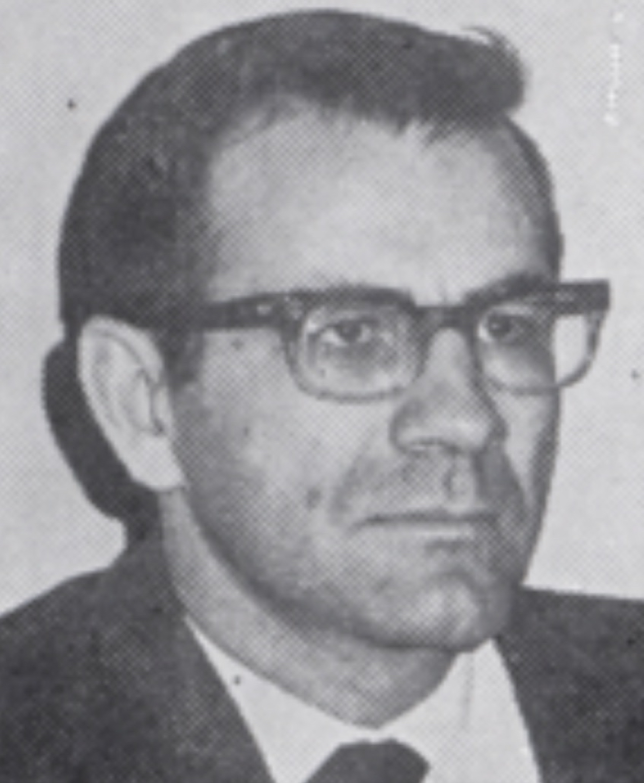
- Granade in 1971

Member of the Georgia House of Representatives
- In office 1971–1972

Personal details
- Born: Gaines Calhoun Granade; February 19, 1934 Frankville, Alabama, U.S.
- Died: September 16, 2025 (aged 91) Lawrenceville, Georgia, U.S.
- Party: Republican
- Education: Mercer University; Woodrow Wilson School of Law

Gaines Calhoun Granade (February 19, 1934 – September 16, 2025) was an American politician. A member of the Republican Party, he served in the Georgia House of Representatives from 1971 to 1972.

== Early life and career ==
Granade was born in Frankville, Alabama on February 19, 1934, the son of James Adam Granade and Eugenia Tate. He attended Mercer University, earning his AB degree in 1959. He also attended Woodrow Wilson School of Law, earning his LLB degree in 1965. After earning his degrees, he worked as an attorney in Atlanta, Georgia.

Granade served in the Georgia House of Representatives from 1971 to 1972.

== Personal life and death ==
In 1959, Granade married Charlotte Frances Swann, a gardener. Their marriage lasted until her death in 2022.

Granade died in Lawrenceville, Georgia, on September 16, 2025, at the age of 91.
