= Max Nowlan =

Australian rules footballer

Personal information
- Full name: Max Nowlan
- Born: 9 March 1939
- Died: 13 September 2025 (aged 86)
- Original team: East Sandringham
- Height: 183 cm (6 ft 0 in)
- Weight: 83 kg (183 lb)
- Position: Back pocket

Playing career^{1}
Years	Club	Games (Goals)
1959, 1962	St Kilda	8 (1)
- ^{1} Playing statistics correct to the end of 1962.

Max Nowlan (9 March 1939 – 13 September 2025) was an Australian rules footballer who played with St Kilda in the Victorian Football League (VFL).
