= Jutta Dümpe-Krüger =

German politician (1962–2025)

Member of the Bundestag
- In office 17 October 2002 – 18 October 2005

Personal details
- Born: 5 September 1962 Dörentrup, North Rhine-Westphalia, West Germany
- Died: 8 September 2025 (aged 63) Lemgo, North Rhine-Westphalia, Germany
- Party: Alliance 90/The Greens
- Occupation: Journalist

Jutta Dümpe-Krüger (5 September 1962 – 8 September 2025) was a German politician of Alliance 90/The Greens.

Dümpe-Krüger served in the Bundestag from 2002 to 2005. She died on 8 September 2025, three days after her 63rd birthday.
