= Carlo Sassi =

Italian sports journalist (1929–2025)

- Born: 1 October 1929; Milan, Italy
- Died: 28 September 2025 (aged 95); Milan, Italy
- Occupation(s): Journalist, television author
- Known for: Popularising slow-motion analysis on RAI's La domenica sportiva

Carlo Sassi (1 October 1929 – 28 September 2025) was an Italian sports journalist and television author, widely credited with popularising systematic slow-motion analysis on Italian television and helping to define the language and ritual of football debate for decades. He became closely associated with the moviola segment on La domenica sportiva, where from the late 1960s he turned slow-motion replays into a weekly interpretive tool that shaped Sunday night discussions of refereeing and the culture of Italian football.

== Early life and education ==
Sassi was born in Milan on 1 October 1929. As a teenager he sought a playing career in football, including a trial with Inter Milan and a contract with Angerese in Serie C before choosing to leave the professional game. He subsequently played at amateur level for several seasons and then worked in a bank for nine years, a sequence often cited as a prelude to his move into broadcasting.

== Career ==
Sassi joined the national broadcaster RAI in 1960 and from the outset worked on La domenica sportiva, the country's longest-running sports programme. Within that newsroom he became identified with an innovation that soon defined Italian football coverage, namely the systematic use of slow-motion review, or moviola, to re-examine contentious incidents. Elements of slow motion had been shown on air earlier on 28 February 1965, when Enzo Tortora introduced the moviola to the audience of La domenica sportiva, but Sassi developed the practice into a regular interpretive instrument for match controversies.

A widely noted turning point came on 22 October 1967 during the Derby della Madonnina between Inter Milan and AC Milan, when Sassi and film editor Heron Vitaletti scrutinised Gianni Rivera's disputed goal frame by frame, inaugurating the "moviola" as an investigative rubric rather than a mere replay. Rai Teche later credited Sassi, with Vitaletti's contribution, for proposing and standardising the moviola feature from 1967 within La domenica sportiva, a format that became a national reference for post-match debate. Over subsequent seasons he refined the approach from selecting episodes to offering on-air analysis, and in the 1980s he fronted segments devoted to contentious incidents that brought direct discussion of individual episodes to a mass audience.

Sassi remained a central figure on La domenica sportiva until 1991, by which time the moviola had become a fixture of Sunday night television and an arena in which refereeing judgment and football culture met in ritualised post-match review. He then participated in RAI's early 1990s formats around the programme's renewal, appearing alongside Sandro Ciotti during the 1992 relaunch of La domenica sportiva. From 1993 he was part of Quelli che... il calcio, conceived by Marino Bartoletti and launched with Fabio Fazio, a Sunday show that mixed live connections and studio commentary and prominently featured Sassi's expertise until 2001.

Beyond the studio Sassi reflected on the scope and limits of television review, arguing that slow motion should not be treated as a definitive evidentiary instrument but as an aid to understanding that coexists with the fallibility of play and officiating. He also figured in later debates over the famous 1981 Juventus and A.S. Roma "gol di Turone," when interviews revived longstanding controversies and prompted renewed discussion in the national press.

== Death ==
Sassi died in Milan in September 2025, at the age of 95.
