= Mária J. Nagy =

Romanian academic (1934–2025)

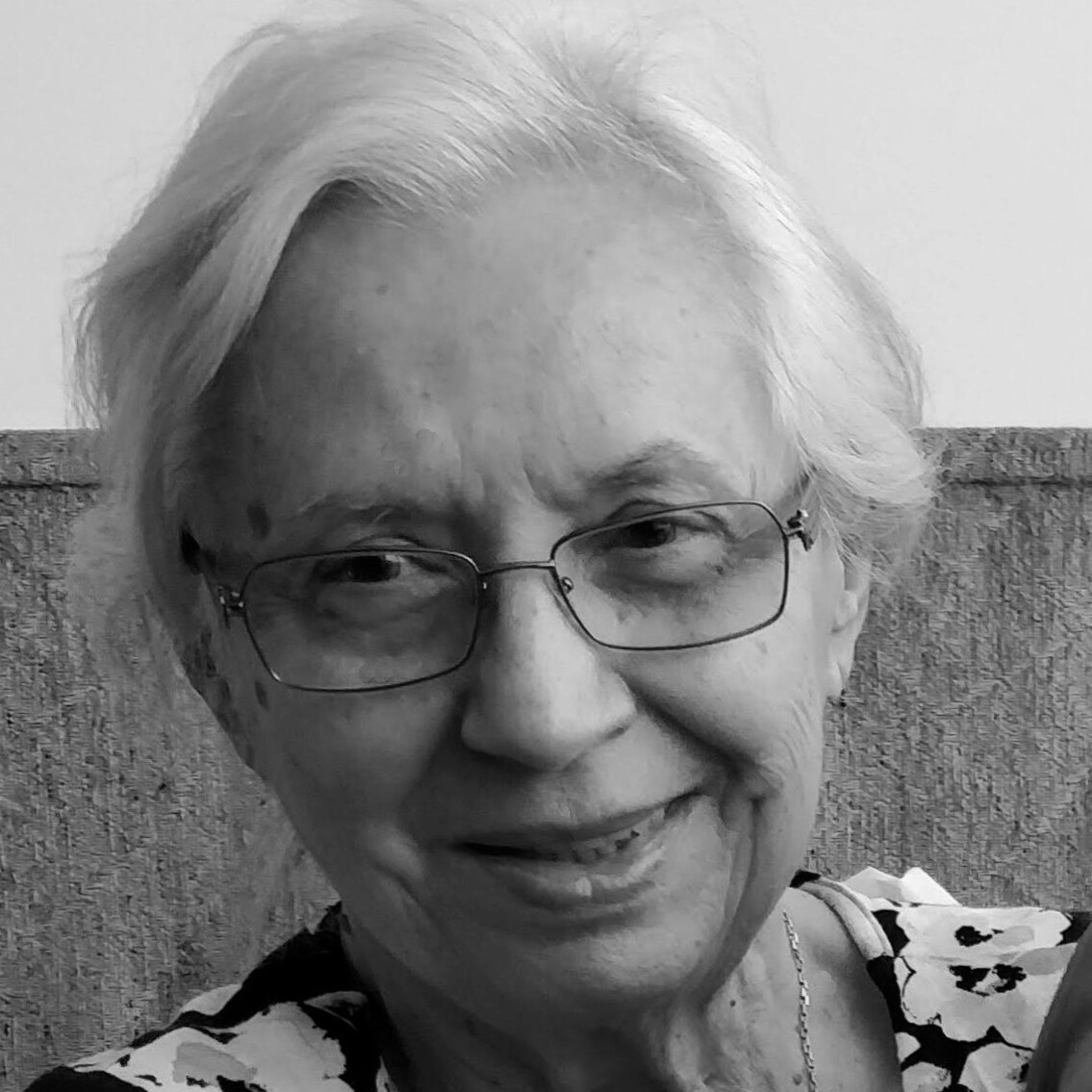
- Born: 27 June 1934; Sighișoara
- Died: 11 September 2025 (aged 91); Târgu Mureș

Mária J. Nagy (née Józsáné; 27 June 1934 – 11 September 2025) was a Romanian linguist, stylist, associate professor, and doctor of philological sciences.

== Biography ==
Nagy came from a Roman Catholic ethnic Hungarian working-class family. She completed high school at Lyceum No. 2 in Târgu Mureș (1952) and earned a teaching certificate in Hungarian language and literature at Bolyai University (1956).

She began her career as a primary school teacher, then from 1957 she worked as an intern, assistant professor, and assistant professor at the university's Department of Hungarian Language and Literature, and continued her work at the university that was reorganized into Babeș–Bolyai University, also as an assistant professor, and after 1989 as an associate professor. In this position, she also took on a public role, among other things, on 8 December 2001 she participated in the gathering of theatre lovers in Cluj-Napoca, where she signed the petition with many others stating that the Cluj-Napoca State Hungarian Theatre is not a privately owned institution and its programming policy should not be dictated by the tastes of a single person.

== Works ==
Her research area is the stylistics of the Hungarian language. Her articles and studies have been published in the columns of NyIrK, Korunk, and A Hét since 1960. She is included in the collection entitled Jelentéstan és stilisztika (Budapest, 1974) with an excerpt from his doctoral dissertation on the poetic style of János Vajda; she has published articles in the collection of studies entitled Anyanyelvünk övölése (1975), edited by Mózes Gálffy and László Murádin; her handbook "on the art of the word" (1975) introduced people to the formal world of modern literary analysis; she discusses the stylistics of word usage in a new light in the collection entitled Literary and stylistic studies (1981).

== Society membership ==
- Member of the Humanities Department of the Transylvanian Museum Association
- Member of the Transylvanian Association of Mother Tongue Nurses in Sepsiszentgyörgy

== Publications ==
- Kis magyar stilisztika (Bartha Jánossal, Horváth Tiborral és Szabó Zoltánnal, 1968)
- A mai magyar nyelv kézikönyve (Balogh Dezsővel és Gálffy Mózessel, 1971)
- A szó művészete (Bevezetés a stíluselemzésbe, 1975)

== Resources ==
- Romániai magyar irodalmi lexikon: Szépirodalom, közírás, tudományos irodalom, művelődés II. (G–Ke). Főszerk. Balogh Edgár. Bukarest: Kriterion. 1991. ISBN 978-973-26-0212-6
- Romániai magyar ki kicsoda. Nagyvárad: RMDSZ-Scripta Kiadó. 1997. 273–274. o. ISBN 978-973-97980-0-6
- Adatai a Petőfi Irodalmi Múzeum katalógusában
