= Detlef Neukirch =

German chess player (1940–2025)

Personal information
- Born: 9 August 1940
- Died: 30 September 2025 (aged 85) Aulendorf, Germany

Chess career
- Country: Germany
- Title: FIDE Master (1991)
- Peak rating: 2375 (January 1980)

Detlef Neukirch (9 August 1940 – 30 September 2025) was a German chess FIDE Master. He was a European Team Chess Championship bronze medalist (1970).

== Biography ==
From 1957 until 1974 Detlef Neukirch was a regular participant in the East German Chess Championship. As part of the SG Leipzig team, he was a multiple winner of the Ēast Germany team chess championship (1970–1973, 1981–1983). In international chess tournaments, Detlef Neukirch showed the best result in 1976 in Brno, where he took 2nd place.

Detlef Neukirch played for East Germany in the European Team Chess Championships:

- In 1970, at second reserve board in the 4th European Team Chess Championship in Kapfenberg (+0, =3, -0) and won team bronze medal.

Detlef Neukirch played for East Germany in the European Team Chess Championship preliminaries:

- In 1965, at ninth board in the 3th European Team Chess Championship preliminaries (+0, =4, -1),
- In 1970, at reserve board in the 4th European Team Chess Championship preliminaries (+1, =1, -0).

Detlef Neukirch played for East Germany in the World Student Team Chess Championships:

- In 1962, at fourth board in the 9th World Student Team Chess Championship in Mariánské Lázně (+2, =1, -2),
- In 1964, at second board in the 11th World Student Team Chess Championship in Kraków (+3, =3, -5),
- In 1965, at second board in the 12th World Student Team Chess Championship in Sinaia (+2, =5, -4),
- In 1966, at second board in the 13th World Student Team Chess Championship in Örebro (+1, =6, -5),
- In 1967, at second board in the 14th World Student Team Chess Championship in Harrachov (+5, =5, -2).
