= Emogene Creque =

British Virgin Islands politician (1919–2025)

Nominated Member of the Legislative Council
- In office 1965

Personal details
- Born: Emogene Augustus Pickering; 22 July 1919; Road Town, British Virgin Islands
- Died: 9 September 2025 (aged 106)
- Spouse: Henry Creque (m. 1942, died)
- Children: 7

Emogene Augusta Creque (née Pickering; 22 July 1919 – 9 September 2025) was a British Virgin Islands politician. In 1965, she became the first female member of the Legislative Council.

== Life and career ==
Creque was born in Road Town on 22 July 1919, the daughter of Anita Nibbs and Frederick Pickering. In 1942, she married Henry Creque, with whom she had seven children. They, also, had thirteen grandchildren and sixteen greatgrandchildren. Her husband later became a member of the Legislative Council. In 1965, Emogene was also appointed to the council as a temporary substitute for Joseph O'Neal while he was abroad, becoming its first female member.

Creque turned 100 in July 2019. As of September 2023, she resided on Tortola. Creque died on 9 September 2025, at the age of 106.
