= Mikhail Gorbanevsky =

Russian local historian

- Михаил Горбаневский
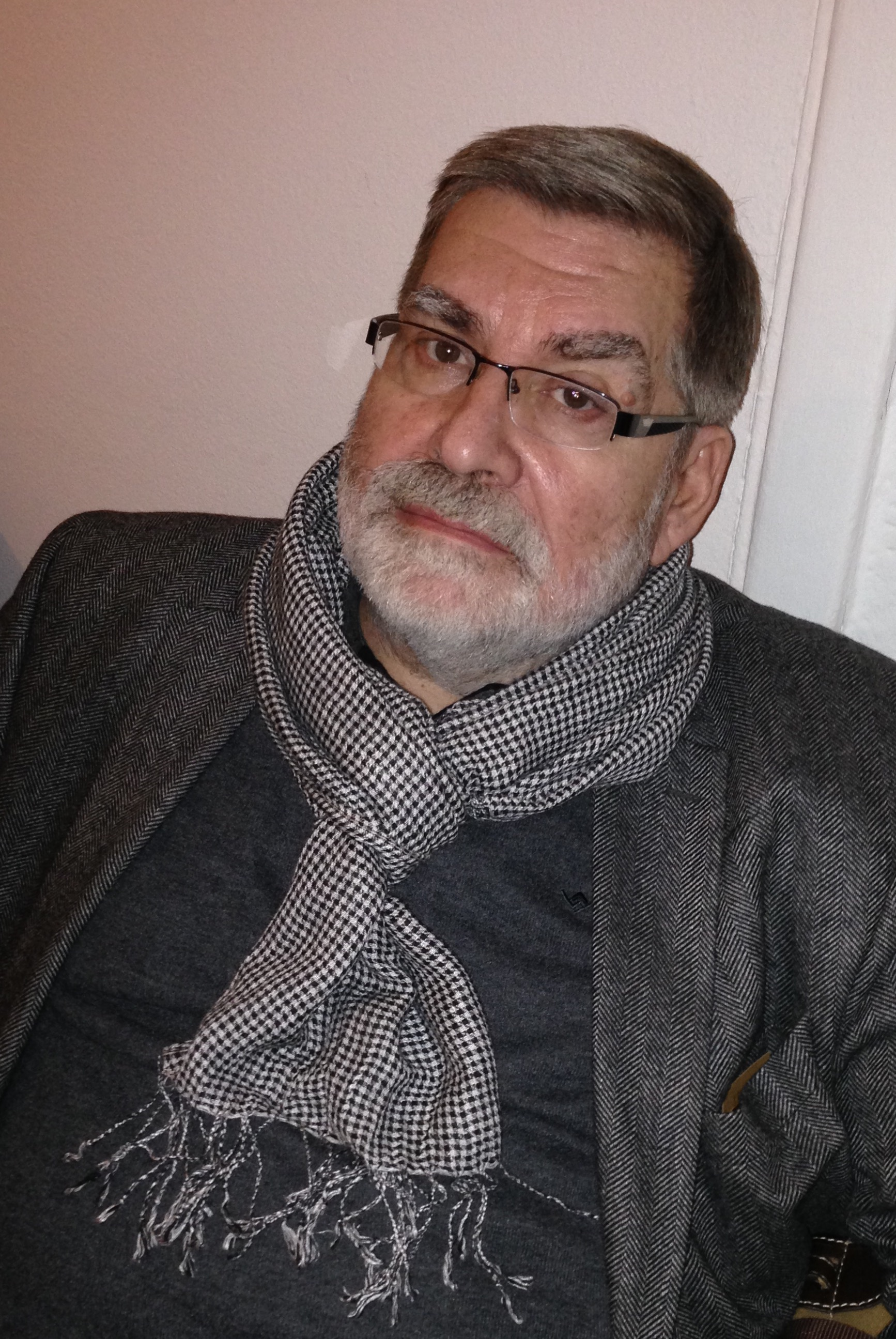
- Gorbanevsky in 2015
- Born: Mikhail Viktorovich Gorbanevsky; 21 May 1953; Chelyabinsk, Russian SFSR, USSR
- Died: 20 September 2025 (aged 72)
- Parent(s): Viktor Gorbanevsky; Galina Gorbanevskaya

Academic background
- Education: Peoples' Friendship University of Russia; Pushkin Institute
- Thesis: Russian Urban Toponymy: Problems of Historical and Cultural Study and Modern Lexicographic Description (1994)

Academic work
- Discipline: Linguist
- Sub-discipline: Onomastics, forensic linguistics, lexicology

Mikhail Viktorovich Gorbanevsky (Russian: Михаи́л Ви́кторович Горбане́вский; 21 May 1953 – 20 September 2025) was a Soviet and Russian linguist. His studies include general and Russian onomastics, toponymy and lexicology, forensic linguistic expertise, Slavic studies and speech culture, Russian language in computer technologies. He earned his Doctor of Philology in 1994. He became a Professor of the Department of General and Russian Linguistics of Peoples' Friendship University of Russia in 1996.

Gorbanevsky served as vice president of the Society of Lovers of Russian Literature (1996). Chairman of the Board of the Guild of Linguistic Experts on Documentation and Information Disputes (2001). Member of the Union of Journalists of Russia (1985). He was a member of the International Federation of Journalists (IFJ).

He was a full member of the Russian Geographical Society (1977) and an Academician of the Russian Academy of Natural Sciences (2007).

Gorbanevsky died on 20 September 2025, at the age of 72.
