= Cor Vos =

Dutch photographer (1948–2025)

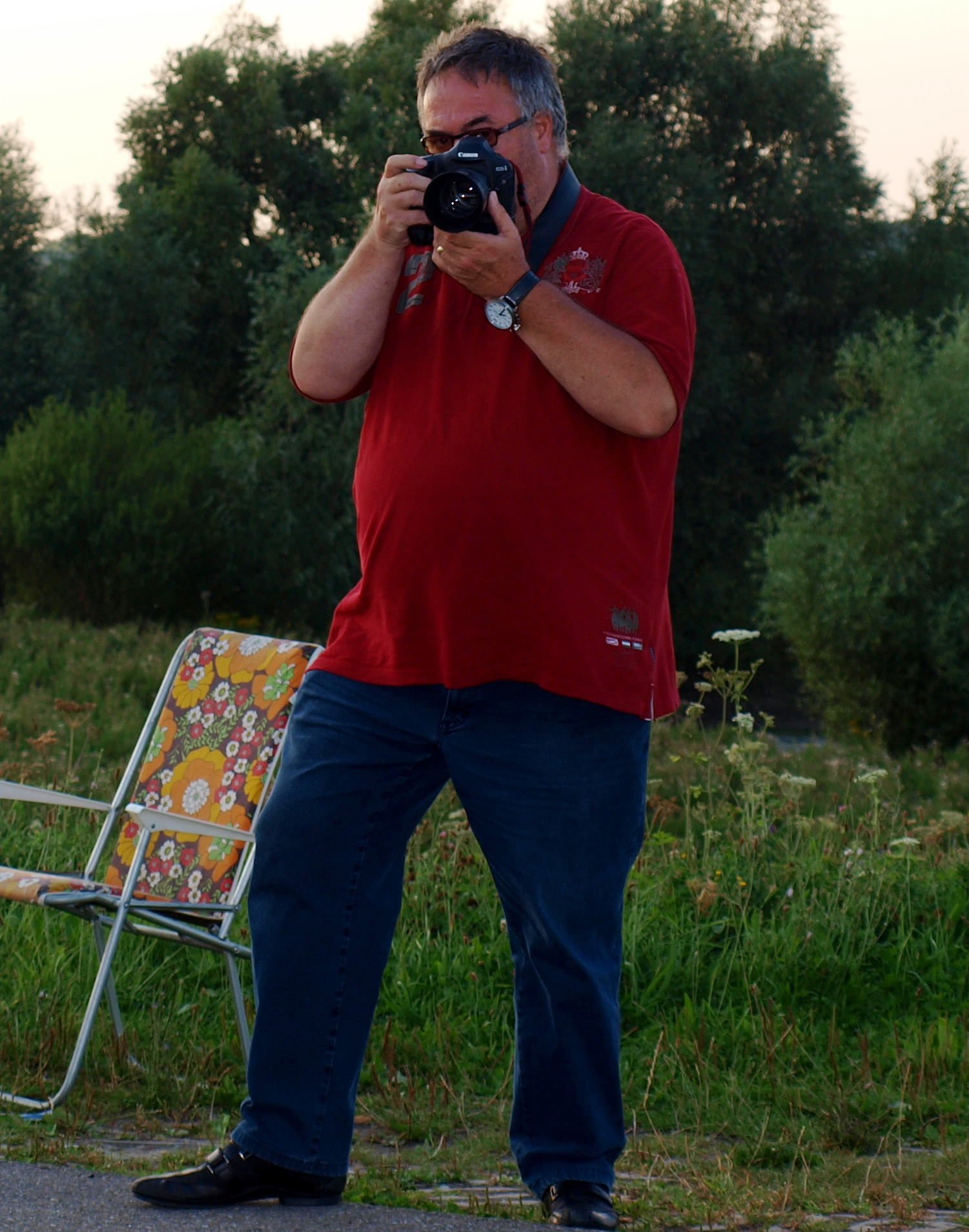
- Vos in 2009
- Born: Cornelis Antonius Wilhelmus Vos; 29 June 1948; Rotterdam, Netherlands
- Died: 30 September 2025 (aged 77); Rotterdam, Netherlands
- Occupation: Photographer

Cornelis Antonius Wilhelmus Vos (29 June 1948 – 30 September 2025) was a Dutch photographer. He was best known for his photographs of multiple Tour de France events.

Vos died in Rotterdam on 30 September 2025, at the age of 77.
