= Jean-Louis Le Mouël =

French physicist (1938–2025)

Jean-Louis Le Mouël (29 July 1938 – 24 September 2025) was a French geophysicist who was researcher at the Institut de Physique du Globe de Paris (IPGP), which he chaired, and member of the French Academy of sciences since 1988.

== Life and career ==
Le Mouël published numerous articles in academic journals, in particular with Vincent Courtillot. He is a recognized specialist in geomagnetism. His work in this field earned him the John Adam Fleming Medal in 1997. He was a member of the American Geophysical Union and the Royal Astronomical Society, a former president of the Geological Society of France, and has received numerous scientific and non-scientific decorations. Officer of the Légion d'Honneur, CNRS Silver Medal in 1984, he also received the Grand Prix from the French Atomic Energy Commission in 1987 and the Petrus-Peregrinus Medal from the European Geosciences Union in 2004.

He questioned the importance of human influence on global warming. Le Mouël declared in 2009:

"The climate has varied greatly over the centuries and years. Is the recent warming due solely to human activity and the production of greenhouse gases? In view of the available observations, man-made global warming is only a hypothesis, which should be considered and discussed as such. Similarly, the consequences that are drawn from it should be discussed calmly".

Le Mouël therefore called for a dispassionate scientific debate. For him, it is essentially solar activity that impacts the climate, as well as the Earth's magnetism.

Le Mouël died on 24 September 2025, at the age of 87.

== Selected publications ==
- 1971, "Aeromagnetic Survey Of South-Western Europe Aeromagnetic Survey Of South-Western Europe", Earth and planetary science letters 12, with Eugène Le Borgne and Xavier Le Pichon
- V. Courtillot, J. Ducruix, J.l. Le Mouel, "Sur une accélération récente de la variation séculaire du champ magnétique terrestre", C.R.Acad.Sci.Paris, D287, 1095-1098 (1978)
- V. Courtillot, A. Galdeano, J.l. Le Mouel, "Propagation of an accreting plate boundary : discussion of a new aeromagnetic survey of the Republic of Djibouti", Earth Planet. Sci. Lett., 47, 144-160 (1980)
- " Le globe ", Jean-Louis Le Mouël, Xavier Le Pichon, Claude Japart, in Université de tous les savoirs, T15, Odile Jacob, 05/2002
- 2007, "Are there connections between Earth's magnetic field and climate?", Earth Planet. Sci. Lett., 253, 328–339, with Vincent Courtillot
