= Fumitaka Sato =

Japanese astrophysicist (1938–2025)

Fumitaka Sato (23 March 1938 – 14 September 2025) was a Japanese astrophysicist and theoretical physicist. He died from bacterial pneumonia at a hospital in Kyoto, on 14 September 2025, at the age of 87.
