= Babak Shahbazi =

Iranian spy (1981–2025)

Babak Shahbazi (1981 – 17 September 2025) was an Iranian cooling technician who was hanged in Ghezel Hesar prison after being convicted of collecting security information about data centers in the republic and selling it to Israel's Mossad. The Iranian verdict was challenged by Iran Human Rights, a foreign organization who linked it to the Russo-Ukrainian War, suggesting he had been trained by Israel to use Microsoft Word.

Shahbazi also worked with Esmail Fekri, who was hanged in June 2025.
