= William Thomas (historian) =

British historian (1936–2025)

William Eden Sherwood Thomas (4 June 1936 – 30 September 2025) was a British historian. He taught Modern history at Christ Church, Oxford from 1968 to 2003. He specialised in British history of the first half of the nineteenth century. His works include The Philosophic Radicals (1979), The Quarrel of Croker and Macaulay (2000), and a five-volume edition of the Journals of Thomas Babington Macaulay (2016).

William Thomas was born in British India and educated in King's School, Canterbury, Magdalen College, and Merton College. He started his teaching career in the new University of York in 1963, and was involved in setting up the Department of History there. He moved to Oxford in 1967 and was elected Tutor in Modern History in 1968. He edited the Annual Report for six years in Christ Church.

He died on 30 September 2025.
