= John Martinkus =

Australian journalist (1969–2025)

John Martinkus (9 March 1969 – 14 September 2025) was an Australian print and television journalist known for his reporting from conflict zones. He was nominated four times for the Walkley award for investigative reporting.

== Early life and education ==
John Martinkus was born in Melbourne in 1969, the youngest child of a Lithuanian migrant father and Australian mother. He studied international relations at LaTrobe and learned Russian in Moscow.

== Career ==
He began reporting from Indonesian-occupied East Timor in 1995. Martinkus was the only journalist to travel to Alas to investigate reports of a massacre in 1998 and later reported on the militia violence surrounding the 1999 independence referendum. After the Indonesian military reacted violently to a UN-held referendum in which 78.5% of East Timorese voted for independence, Martinkus's front-page article in the New York Times on September 9, 1999, coincided with US President Clinton agreeing to lean on the Indonesian government to allow peacekeepers to go to Timor. After being forced to leave the United Nations compound and Timor on September 10, 1999 John returned with the Australian-led peacekeeping forces Interfet, on the first plane back on September 20.

He reported extensively from Papua and Aceh in Indonesia, two provinces which have also had long-running wars for independence. Later, he reported for SBS Dateline from the Middle East and Iraq. In October 2004, he was kidnapped outside his hotel in Baghdad by Sunni insurgents who released him 24 hours later after using Google to verify his status as a journalist.

In 2011, Martinkus was commissioned to travel to Afghanistan as the Official Australian War Cinematographer for the Australian War Memorial.

== Later Years and Death ==
In recent years John Martinkus taught in the School of Journalism, Media and Communications at the University of Tasmania. He was a lecturer there from 2009 to 2015, winning a Vice-Chancellor’s Award for Outstanding Community Engagement in 2013. In 2024 Jose Ramos-Horta presented John Martinkus with the Order of Timor-Leste for “his contribution to the benefit of the country, the Timorese, and humanity.”

Martinkus died in Melbourne on 14 September 2025.

== Bibliography ==
=== Books ===
- Martinkus, John (2001). A dirty little war. Sydney: Random House Australia. Shortlisted for the NSW Premier’s Literary Awards.
- Paradise Betrayed: West Papua's Struggle for Independence (Black Inc 2002)
- Indonesia's Secret War in Aceh (Random House 2004)
- Travels in American Iraq (Black Inc 2004)
- Lost Copy: The Endless Wars: Iraq and Afghanistan (Australian Scholarly Publishing 2017)
- The Road: Uprising in West Papua (Black Inc 2020)

=== Articles and other contributions ===
- Martinkus, John (March 2003). "Paradise betrayed". Response to Correspondence. Quarterly Essay. 9: 113–117.
