= Ron Bowe =

Australian sportsman

Personal information
- Full name: Ronald Doig Bowe
- Born: 10 December 1939; Beaconsfield, Western Australia
- Died: 26 September 2025 (aged 85); Fremantle, Western Australia
- Batting: Right-handed
- Role: Batsman

Domestic team information
- Years: Team
- 1967/68–1968/69: Western Australia

Career statistics
Competition	First-class
Matches	3
Runs scored	110
Batting average	22.00
100s/50s	0/1
Top score	86
Catches/stumpings	3/–
- Source: CricketArchive, 25 May 2020

Ronald Doig Bowe (10 December 1939 – 26 September 2025) was an Australian sportsman who played Sheffield Shield cricket with Western Australia and Australian rules football for South Fremantle in the West Australian National Football League (WANFL).

Bowe played 58 games for South Fremantle, between 1959 and 1963. His grandfather, James Doig, made over 200 league appearances and was the uncle of the great George Doig.

He made his first-class cricket debut in the 1967/68 Sheffield Shield season, against Victoria at the Melbourne Cricket Ground. Opening the batting, Bowe had put on 30 runs in the first innings before retiring hurt. He came back to the crease with the side four down and went on to make 86 before being bowled by Alan Connolly. In the second innings, Western Australian required just 19 for victory, which Bowe and his opening partner Derek Chadwick achieved without losing a wicket. At the conclusion of the match, Bowe had a first-class average of 97 but that would fall sharply as he could only put together a further 13 runs in his next four innings. His first two were against the West Indies in 1968/69, where he was dismissed by Wes Hall twice. He also played a Shield match against Victoria that season, this time at the WACA, but scored a duck and four.

Bowe died on 26 September 2025, at the age of 85.
