= Michel Dessaint =

French politician (1935–2025)

Deputy of the French National Assembly for Nord's 11th constituency
- In office 19 June 1995 – 21 April 1997
- Preceded by: Françoise Hostalier
- Succeeded by: Yves Durand

Personal details
- Born: 28 February 1935; Carvin, France
- Died: 21 September 2025 (aged 90); Hamel, France
- Political party: CD; UDF; MoDem
- Occupation: Doctor

Michel Dessaint (French: [miʃɛl dɛsɛ̃]; 28 February 1935 – 21 September 2025) was a French politician of the Union for French Democracy (UDF).

Dessaint served as a deputy in the National Assembly from 1995 to 1997.

Dessaint died in Hamel on 21 September 2025, at the age of 90.
