= Ian Jones (Australian footballer) =

Australian rules footballer (1932–2025)

Personal information
- Full name: Ian Jones
- Born: 20 July 1932
- Died: 4 September 2025 (aged 93)
- Original team: Brunswick Amateurs
- Height: 183 cm (6 ft 0 in)
- Weight: 78 kg (172 lb)

Playing career
Years	Club	Games (Goals)
1954–55	North Melbourne	6 (0)

Ian Jones (20 July 1932 – 4 September 2025) was an Australian rules footballer who played with North Melbourne in the Victorian Football League (VFL).
