= Marcy Morrison =

American politician (1935–2025)

Mayor of Manitou Springs, Colorado
- In office 2001–2007

Member of the Colorado House of Representatives from the 22nd district
- In office 1988–2000

Commissioner of El Paso County, Colorado
- In office 1984–1988

Personal details
- Born: August 9, 1935 New York, U.S.
- Died: September 5, 2025 (aged 90)
- Party: Republican

Marcy Morrison (August 9, 1935 - September 5, 2025) was a county commissioner, state legislator, and mayor in Colorado. A Republican, she described herself as a Rockefeller Republican. She served as mayor and Manitou Springs and represented El Paso County in the Colorado House of Representatives.

== Biography ==
Morrison was born in New York and later moved to Colorado with her husband. After they moved to Manitou Springs, they had children. She became a member of the League of Women Voters and the Sisterhood of Temple Shalom. She was Jewish.

Morrison began her career as a volunteer at a local library and joined the library board. She was then elected to the school board and served from 1973 to 1984. In 1984, she became the first woman elected as El Paso County Commissioner. She served as commissioner until 1988.

From 1988 to 2000, she was a State Representative for El Paso County. While a state representative, she was the chair of the House health committee from 1992 to 2000. In 2001, she was elected mayor of Manitou Springs and served for six years.

In 2007, Colorado Governor Bill Ritter appointed her the commissioner of the Colorado Division of Insurance, and she served until 2010. She later became CEO of the iManitou department for the City of Manitou Springs.

== Honors ==
In 2021, Morrison was honored in a dedication ceremony for the Beckers Lane Bridge. In 2022, she was honored as a "superwoman" by the League of Women Voters of the Pikes Peak Region.
