= Antonio Rivero Taravillo =

Spanish writer and poet (1963–2025)

- Born: 10 May 1963; Melilla, Spain
- Died: 19 September 2025 (aged 62); Seville, Spain
- Education: University of Edinburgh; University of Seville
- Occupations: Writer; Poet

Antonio Rivero Taravillo (10 May 1963 – 19 September 2025) was a Spanish writer, poet and literary critic.

Rivero was notably the 2017 recipient of the Premio de Aforismos Rafael Pérez Estrada for the collective work Especulaciones ciegas.

Rivero died in Seville on 19 September 2025, at the age of 62.

== Works ==
=== Poems ===
- Bajo otra luz (1989)
- Farewell to Poesy (2002)
- El árbol de la vida (2004)
- Lejos (2011)
- La lluvia (2013)
- Lo que importa (2015)
- El bosque sin regreso (2016)
- Svarabhakti (2019)
- Más tarde (2019)
- Sextante (2021)
- Los hilos rotos (2022)
- Suite irlandesa (2023)
- Luna sin rostro

=== Novels ===
- Los huesos olvidados (2014)
- Los fantasmas de Yeats (2017)
- El Ausente: La novela de José Antonio Primo de Rivera (2018)
