= Indrek Meelak =

Estonian prosecutor and politician (1960–2025)

Indrek Meelak (10 October 1960 – 2 September 2025) was an Estonian prosecutor and politician.

== Life and career ==
Meelak was born in Tallinn on 10 October 1960. He was a member of IX Riigikogu representing the Estonian Centre Party. Meelak died on 2 September 2025, at the age of 64.
