= Pierre-Jean Ruff =

French Protestant pastor (1932–2025)

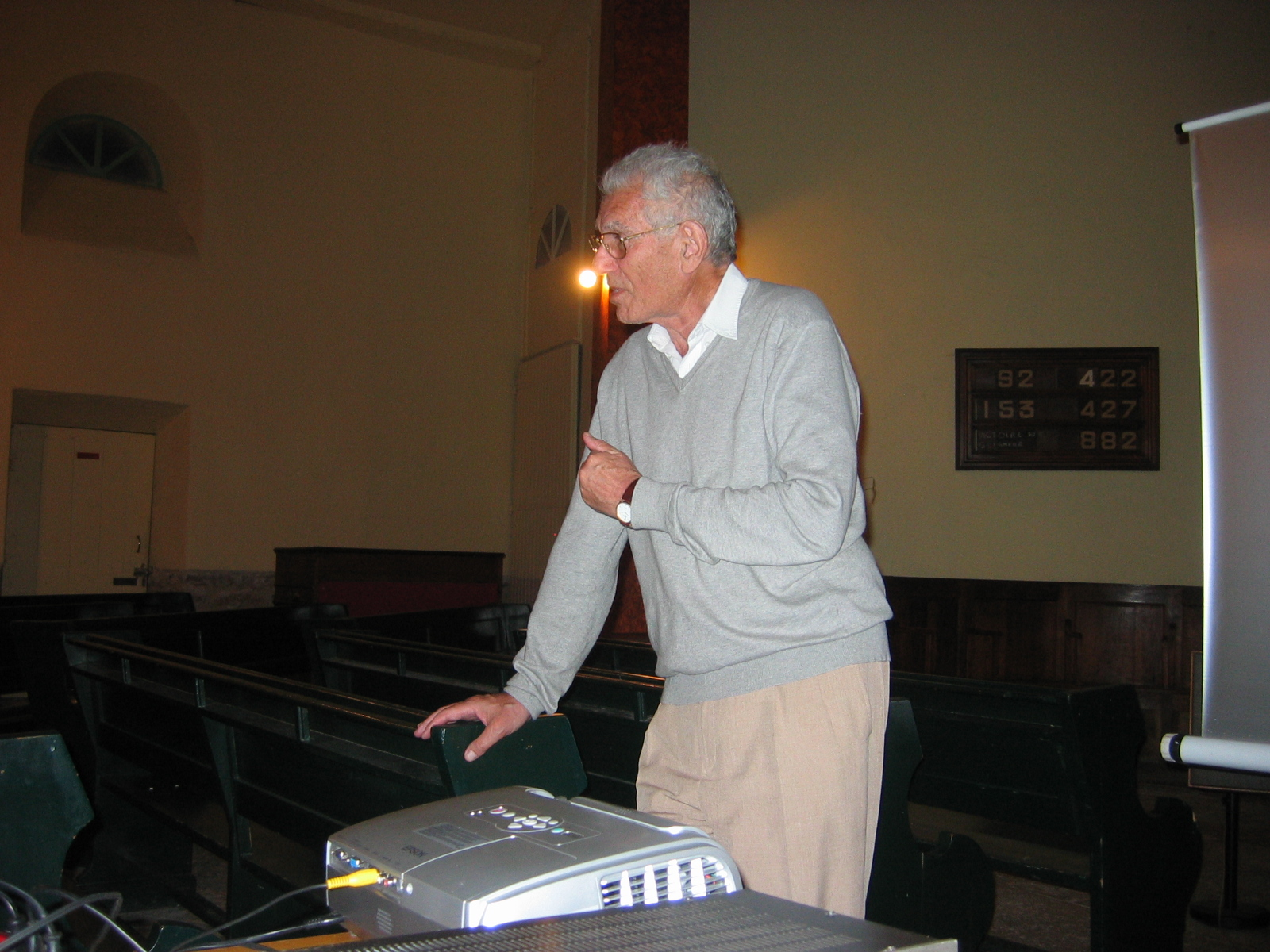
- Ruff in 2010
- Born: 14 July 1932; Marseille, France
- Died: 6 September 2025 (aged 93); Mende, France
- Occupation: Pastor

Pierre-Jean Ruff (French: [pjɛʁ ʒɑ̃ ʁyf]; 14 July 1932 – 6 September 2025) was a French Protestant pastor.

== Biography ==
Born in Marseille on 14 July 1932, Ruff had a Protestant upbringing before serving as the president of the Comité Justice et Paix pour la Palestine et le Proche-Orient for five years in the 5th arrondissement of Paris. Until 2015, he was pastor of the Reformed Church, Copenhagen. Throughout his career, he followed the theology of liberal Protestantism, characterized by Gnosticism and Catharism. He mainly drew inspiration from Louis Évely and Charles Wagner. He also disagreed with other Christians about the afterlife. For eight years, he was president of the Comité Évangile et Liberté and joined the Fédération des Réseaux du Parvis in 2004.

Ruff died in Mende on 6 September 2025, at the age of 93.

== Publications ==
=== Books ===
- Être pasteur aujourd’hui ? (1980)
- Comment comprendre la Bible ? (1983)
- Un seul Dieu ? Ou Le problème du Mal (1989)
- Le protestantisme libéral : vers un christianisme d’ouverture (1994)
- Souffle des quatre vents : plaidoyer pour l’Esprit et la mystique (1994)
- Le Dieu Esprit : méditations à partir de l’Évangile de Jean (1996)
- Charles Wagner et le Foyer de l’Âme : histoire et combats (1999)
- Marie de Magdala, figure de proue du christianisme de sensibilité gnostique (2004)
- Tous exorcistes : notre pouvoir sur le Mal (2007)
- Charles Wagner, chantre d'une théologie biblique, naturelle et libérale (2008)
- Des dérives des religions aux dérives qu'elles suscitent (2008)
- Le temple du Rouve, lieu de mémoire des Camisards (2008)
- Dieu veut il le mal ? (2008)
- Ce que je crois : quelle théologie et quelle prédication pour le XXIe siècle ? (2010)
- La culpabilité et le pardon : considérations impertinentes (2012)
- Christianisme et islam (2013)
- L'euthanasie : comment respecte-t-on le mieux la vie ? (2013)
- La Foi et l'Athéisme: que croire ? (2013)
- Impensable Résurrection ? À Demain (?) Ailleurs (?) Autrement (?) (2014)
- Les camisards. Un combat pour la liberté de conscience (2015)
- Le dieu démuni. L'homme est-il responsable du mal ? (2019)

=== Collective works ===
- Ferdinand Buisson et Charles Wagner, Sommes-nous tous des libres croyants ? (1992)
- Anne Brenon et Pierre-Jean Ruff, Le christianisme des bons hommes : message des cathares pour aujourd’hui (1995)
- Anne Faisandier et Pierre-Jean Ruff : Comment annoncer l'Evangile aujourd'hui ? (2019)
