= Ruth Johns =

British social historian and writer (1934–2025)

Ruth Isabella Johns (née Thomas; 28 January 1934 – 21 September 2025) was a British social historian, community organiser, journalist and author.

== Background ==
Johns was born in Romford, Essex on 28 January 1934. Her mother Dorothy Thomas (née Dann) was a teacher until she was married and was forced to give up her profession due to the marriage bar. Her father was Gilbert Thomas, an author and poet.

In 1991, Johns completed an MA in Peace Studies at Bradford University.

Johns died on 21 September 2025, at the age of 91.

== Work ==
In 1961, Johns became a founding member of the Pre-School Playgroups Association. Along with another mother she ran a children's playgroup at home three mornings a week and worked as a community organiser to campaign with mothers living in the newly built high-rise flats to be able to organise a playground for their preschool children.

Starting in 1963, Johns developed the idea for the Alexandra Park Housing Association which eventually became the Family First Trust, a community housing association at the Croft, Alexandra Park, Nottingham offering non-institutional modern accommodation to young single mothers and deserted wives expecting or with baby. The project was called a "revolutionary idea" by the Home Office. Between 1965 and 1976 Family First housed over one thousand families or individuals who were homeless or in a state of crisis in their lives.

Johns and Family First also advocated for improvement of sub-standard council housing, rather than wholesale demolition and redevelopment with residents rehoused in different areas.

In 1976, after her divorce, Johns moved to London with her children and became the National Director of Action Resource Centre (ARC), advising government and large companies on how they could support community initiatives.

As finding employment for young people became an increasingly critical issue, she wrote the outline of the initiative which became the Prince's Trust.

== Published works ==
Her first book Life Goes On, about the first ten years as Director of Family First was sponsored by the Gulbenkian Foundation and published independently in 1982.

Johns wrote and published several other books with Plowright Press, including the Ordinary Lives series which offers an insight into the everyday lives of working-class people and women in Britain in the 20th century.

In 2002 her book St Ann's Nottingham: inner city voices was published.

== Disability ==
In 1987 after several years of unexplained illness, Johns was diagnosed with Myalgic Encephalomyelitis (ME).
