= Deaths in July 2007 =

The following is a list of notable deaths in July 2007.

Entries for each day are listed alphabetically by surname. A typical entry lists information in the following sequence:

- Name, age, country of citizenship at birth, subsequent country of citizenship (if applicable), reason for notability, cause of death (if known), and reference.

== July 2007 ==
=== 1 ===
- Joerg Kalt, 40, Austrian cinematographer, suicide.
- Robert McBride, 96, American composer and instrumentalist.
- Colleen McCrory, 57, Canadian environmental activist, brain cancer.
- David Ritcheson, 18, American hate crime victim, suicide by jumping.
- Gerhard Skrobek, 85, German sculptor of Hummel figurines, complications of heart surgery.

=== 2 ===
- Philip Booth, 81, American poet and educator, complications from Alzheimer's disease.
- Robert Brown, 71, American cartoonist, stroke.
- Brahim Déby, 27, Chadian son of the national President and former presidential advisor, chemical asphyxiation.
- Howell M. Estes II, 92, American Air Force general during the Vietnam War, heart ailment.
- Ray Goins, 71, American bluegrass musician.
- Bill Hale, 92, Australian rugby league player (St. George Dragons).
- Robert Keeton, 88, American District Court judge, professor at Harvard Law School, complications from pulmonary embolism.
- Peter Lyman, 66, American information researcher, brain cancer.
- John Pinches, 91, British rower and soldier.
- Dilip Sardesai, 66, Indian cricketer, multiple organ failure.
- Beverly Sills, 78, American opera singer, lung cancer.
- Jimmy Walker, 63, American basketball player (Detroit Pistons, Houston Rockets, Kansas City Kings), lung cancer.
- Al Williams, 60, American basketball player, liver cancer.
- Kevin Woodcock, 64, British cartoonist.
- Hy Zaret, 99, American lyricist ("Unchained Melody").

=== 3 ===
- Anne Dreydel, 89, British educationalist, co-founder of the Oxford English Centre.
- Felix Gerritzen, 80, German footballer.
- Eric Gullage, 63, Canadian politician, cancer.
- Beppie Noyes, 87, American author, stroke.
- Claude Pompidou, 94, French widow of former Prime Minister and President Georges Pompidou.
- Boots Randolph, 80, American saxophonist ("Yakety Sax"), cerebral hemorrhage.
- Dave Simmons, 58, English footballer (Colchester United, Brentford).

=== 4 ===
- Barış Akarsu, 28, Turkish rock musician, car accident.
- Liane Bahler, 25, German cyclist, car accident.
- Andrew Clough, 37, British Olympic canoeist (1992).
- José Roberto Espinosa, 59, Mexican footballer, coach and journalist, pneumonia and cancer.
- Johnny Frigo, 90, American jazz violinist and bass player, complications from a fall.
- Ken MacAfee, 77, American football player, heart attack.
- James Street, 13, American voice actor (Strawberry Shortcake, Madeline in Tahiti), fatal head injuries from a skateboarding accident.
- Bill Pinkney, 81, American singer who was the last original member of The Drifters, probable heart attack.
- X1, 28, American rapper and Onyx affiliate, suicide.
- Osvaldo Romo, 70, Chilean security agent jailed for human rights abuses under Pinochet, heart and respiratory problems.
- Ted Row, 84, Australian politician.
- Eleanor Stewart, 94, American film and voice actor, Alzheimer's disease.
- Henrique Viana, 71, Portuguese actor and singer, cancer.

=== 5 ===
- Kazimierz Błasiński, 80, Polish Olympic rower (1956).
- Régine Crespin, 80, French operatic soprano, liver cancer.
- Odile Crick, 86, British-born artist, cancer.
- David Hilberman, 95, American animator (Bambi, The Smurfs, He-Man and the Masters of the Universe), co-founder of United Productions of America.
- Kerwin Mathews, 81, American actor (The 7th Voyage of Sinbad, The Three Worlds of Gulliver, Jack the Giant Killer).
- George Melly, 80, British jazz and blues musician, lung cancer.
- Sylvan Shemitz, 82, United States lighting designer for Jefferson Memorial, Grand Central Terminal, heart attack.

=== 6 ===
- Don Mumford, 53, American jazz drummer.
- Marguerite Vogt, 94, American polio and cancer researcher.
- Eileen Wearne, 95, Australian athlete at the 1932 Summer Olympics and Australia's oldest surviving Olympian.
- Kathleen E. Woodiwiss, 68, American romance writer, cancer.
- Lois Wyse, 80, American advertising executive, author and columnist, stomach cancer.

=== 7 ===
- Ion Calvocoressi, 88, British soldier and stockbroker.
- Yuneisy Castillo, 27, Cuban Olympic softball player (2000).
- Dame Anne McLaren, 80, British geneticist and developmental biologist, car accident.
- Donald Michie, 83, British researcher in artificial intelligence, car accident.
- John G. Mitchell, 75, American environment editor and author, National Geographic (1994–2004), heart attack.
- Jack Odell, 87, British engineer and co-founder of Matchbox Toys.
- John Szarkowski, 81, American photography curator, complications of a stroke.

=== 8 ===
- Alemão, 23, Brazilian footballer, car accident.
- Jindřich Feld, 82, Czech composer.
- Haroon-ul-Islam, Pakistan Army Lieutenant-Colonel, shot.
- Itzik Kol, 75, Israeli film producer, pneumonia.
- Chandra Shekhar, 80, Indian Prime Minister (1990–1991) and Member of Lok Sabha, multiple myeloma.
- Jack B. Sowards, 78, American screenwriter (Star Trek II: The Wrath of Khan), complications from amyotrophic lateral sclerosis.

=== 9 ===
- Esteban Areta, 75, Spanish international footballer and coach.
- John Baker, 71, Australian general, Chief of the Australian Defence Force (1995–1998).
- Hans Eschenbrenner, 96, German Olympic shooter (1952).
- John Fogarty, 78, Australian rugby union winger, played two tests for the Wallabies.
- John Hill, 83, American lawyer and politician, Texas Attorney General, Texas Supreme Court Chief Justice, heart condition.
- Jerry Ito, 79, Japanese-American actor, pneumonia.
- Charles Lane, 102, American actor (It's a Wonderful Life, You Can't Take It with You, Mr. Smith Goes to Washington).
- Ralph Paffenbarger, 84, American doctor who performed an early study on the importance of exercise, heart failure.
- Penny Thomson, 56, British film producer, cancer.
- Peter Tuddenham, 88, British voice actor (Blake's 7).
- John Wilson, 84, Irish politician, Tánaiste (1990–1993).

=== 10 ===
- Doug Baldwin, 84, Canadian ice hockey player (Toronto Maple Leafs, Detroit Red Wings, Chicago Black Hawks).
- Theresa Duncan, 40, American video game designer, suicide.
- Tibor Feheregyhazi, 75, Hungarian-Canadian actor and theatre director, prostate cancer.
- Devin Gaines, 22, American graduate, awarded five undergraduate degrees, drowned.
- Abdul Rashid Ghazi, 43, Pakistani cleric at the Red Mosque in Islamabad, shot.
- Corbin Harney, 87, American Western Shoshone leader and environmental activist, complications from cancer.
- Bucko Kilroy, 86, American football player (Philadelphia Eagles), scout and general manager for the New England Patriots.
- Paulette Libermann, 87, French mathematician.
- Edward Lowbury, 93, British bacteriologist.
- Morton D. Magoffin, 91, American air force colonel and flying ace during World War II.
- Doug Marlette, 57, American Pulitzer Prize-winning cartoonist (Kudzu), car accident.
- Marjorie Morgan, 92, Canadian author, Alzheimer's disease.
- Mireya Rodríguez, 70, Cuban Olympic fencer.
- William Seegers, 106, German-American last veteran of World War I and California's last World War I veteran.
- Zheng Xiaoyu, 62, Chinese official, former head of the State Food and Drug Administration, executed.

=== 11 ===
- Glenda Adams, 68, Australian writer, ovarian cancer.
- Shag Crawford, 90, American baseball umpire.
- Bill Flynn, 58, South African actor, heart attack.
- Livio Fongaro, 69, Italian footballer and coach.
- Richard Franklin, 58, Australian film director (Roadgames), prostate cancer.
- Ove Grahn, 64, Swedish footballer.
- Lady Bird Johnson, 94, American First Lady of the United States (1963–1969), natural causes.
- Rod Lauren, 67, American actor, suicide by jumping.
- Alfonso López Michelsen, 94, Colombian President (1974–1978) and Foreign Minister (1968–1970), heart attack.
- Ed Mirvish, 92, Canadian retail pioneer, natural causes.
- Jimmy Skinner, 90, Canadian ice hockey coach (Detroit Red Wings).
- Timothy Sprigge, 75, British idealist philosopher.
- Larry Staverman, 70, American basketball player and first head coach for the Indiana Pacers (1967–1968).
- Medha Yodh, 79, Indian dancer and dance teacher.

=== 12 ===
- Marc Behm, 82, American writer.
- Robert Burås, 31, Norwegian guitarist for Madrugada and My Midnight Creeps.
- Mr. Butch, 55, American homeless person and local celebrity in Boston, scooter accident.
- Allen Clarke, 96, British educationalist.
- Nigel Dempster, 65, British journalist, progressive supranuclear palsy.
- Pat Fordice, 71, American broadcaster and First Lady of Mississippi (1992–2000), cancer.
- Joseíto, 80, Spanish football player (Real Madrid), stroke.
- Forbes Johnston, 35, British football player (Falkirk, Airdrieonians).
- Jim Mitchell, 63, American porn producer (Behind the Green Door), heart attack.
- James Shen, 98, Taiwanese diplomat, last ambassador of Taiwan to the United States.
- Kesha Wizzart, 18, British singer and television show contestant, murdered.
- Stan Zemanek, 60, Australian radio presenter, brain cancer.

=== 13 ===
- Harry Fain, 88, American family lawyer, pneumonia.
- Otto von der Gablentz, 76, German diplomat.
- Khalid Hassan, 23, Iraqi journalist (The New York Times), shot.
- Frank Maher, 78, British stuntman.
- Michael Readon, 42, American free solo climber, drowned.

=== 14 ===
- Edward Boyse, 83, American physician, pneumonia.
- Charles Cahill, 91, Australian rugby league footballer.
- Eva Crackles, 89, British botanist.
- Nan Cross, 79, South African anti-apartheid activist.
- John Ferguson Sr., 68, Canadian hockey player (Montreal Canadiens) and coach (New York Rangers, Winnipeg Jets), prostate cancer.
- Bernard Pagel, 77, British astrophysicist, cancer.
- Russel Timoshenko, 23, NYPD police officer.
- John Warrender, 2nd Baron Bruntisfield, 86, British soldier and aristocrat.

=== 15 ===
- Bluma Appel, 86, Canadian philanthropist and patron of the arts, lung cancer.
- Alberto Romão Dias, 65-66, Portuguese organometallic chemist, professor at the IST.
- Kelly Johnson, 49, British guitarist (Girlschool), cancer of the spine.
- Kieron Moore, 82, Irish actor (The League of Gentlemen, The Day of the Triffids).
- Schelto Patijn, 70, Dutch politician, mayor of Amsterdam (1994–2001).
- Tsang Tsou Choi, 85, Hong Kong-based graffiti artist whose works were included in the 2003 Venice Biennale, heart disease.

=== 16 ===
- Angus Allan, 70, British comic strip writer.
- Dick Ault, 81, American hurdler and Olympian (1948).
- Simone Barck, 62, German contemporary historian and literary scholar.
- Tom Brooks, 88, Australian cricketer (New South Wales) and international umpire.
- Mikhail Kononov, 67, Russian actor (Guest from the Future, Siberiade, A Railway Station for Two), after long illness.
- Sándor Krebs, 80, Hungarian Olympic sports shooter (1956, 1960).
- Carl McNabb, 90, American baseball player (Detroit Tigers).
- Dmitri Prigov, 66, Russian poet, heart attack.
- Danielle Georgette Reddé, 95, French resistance fighter in World War II
- Alan Shepherd, 71, British motorcycle racer.
- Kurt Steyrer, 87, Austrian health minister and Socialist presidential candidate, after short illness.

=== 17 ===
- Veljko Bakašun, 87, Croatian Olympic water polo player (1948, 1952).
- Jeremy Blake, 35, American video artist, suicide by drowning.
- Bart Burns, 89, American actor (Mickey Spillane's Mike Hammer, Seven Days in May, Frances).
- Peter Denning, 57, British cricketer (Somerset), cancer.
- Grant Forsberg, 47, American actor (Planes, Trains and Automobiles, Bloodhounds of Broadway, My Man Adam).
- Teresa Stich-Randall, 79, American opera singer.
- Notable Brazilians who were killed in TAM Airlines Flight 3054:
  - Márcio, 35, football player and FIFA agent.
  - Júlio Redecker, 51, leader of the Social Democracy Party.
  - Paulo Rogério Amoretty Souza, 60, chairman of SCI, attorney for Corinthians.

=== 18 ===
- Wayne A. Downing, 67, American retired army general, meningitis.
- Mike Garzoni, 85, American football player (Washington Redskins, New York Giants, New York Yankees).
- Jerry Hadley, 55, American opera singer, suicide by gunshot.
- Charles Jauncey, Baron Jauncey of Tullichettle, 82, British Law Lord.
- John Kronus, 38, American professional wrestler (ECW), heart failure.
- Gary Lupul, 48, Canadian hockey player (Vancouver Canucks).
- Sir Gordon MacWhinnie, 85, British-born Hong Kong accountant and public servant.
- Orlando McFarlane, 69, Cuban Major League Baseball player.
- Kenji Miyamoto, 98, Japanese politician, leader of the Japanese Communist Party for 40 years, old age.
- Sekou Sundiata, 58, American poet, musician and performance artist, heart failure.
- Charles Wylie, 87, British army officer and mountain climber.

=== 19 ===
- Glen Angus, 36, Canadian game artist, heart failure.
- Fred Baugh, 82, Australian Olympic weightlifter (1956).
- A. K. Faezul Huq, 62, Bangladeshi politician, lawyer, and freelance journalist, sudden heart failure.
- Roberto Fontanarrosa, 62, Argentine cartoonist and writer, amyotrophic lateral sclerosis.
- Howard Judd, 71, American women's health researcher, congestive heart failure.
- Sid Kiel, 91, South African doctor and sportsman.
- Shirley Slesinger Lasswell, 84, American marketing pioneer, sued Disney over Winnie the Pooh royalties, respiratory failure.
- Hector MacLean, 93, British World War II fighter pilot.
- Roger Nathan, 2nd Baron Nathan, 84, British solicitor and aristocrat.
- Alanah Woody, 51, American archaeologist, executive director of the Nevada Rock Art Foundation.

=== 20 ===
- Ollie Bridewell, 21, British motorcycle racer, crash during race practice for the British Superbike Championship.
- Ivor Emmanuel, 79, British singer and actor (Zulu), stroke.
- Golde Flami, 89, Argentine actress.
- Tammy Faye Messner, 65, American evangelist, metastatic colon cancer.
- David Preece, 44, British footballer (Luton Town), throat cancer.
- Maurice Riel, 85, Canadian Senator.
- Kai Siegbahn, 89, Swedish physicist at Uppsala University, won Nobel Prize in Physics in 1981.
- Geoff Taylor, 84, English footballer.
- Pete Wilson, 62, American broadcaster, heart attack.

=== 21 ===
- Don Arden, 81, British rock manager, father of Sharon Osbourne.
- Gilbert Bozon, 72, French swimmer and Olympian (1952, 1956).
- René Deceja, 73, Uruguayan Olympic cyclist (1956, 1968).
- Jack Fearey, 84, American television pioneer, Bumbershoot festival founder.
- Bill McLennan, 80, New Zealand rugby league player (national team).
- Jesús de Polanco, 77, Spanish media entrepreneur and publisher (El País), complications of arthritic disease.
- Sherwin Wine, 79, American rabbi, founder of Birmingham Temple and Humanistic Judaism movement, car accident.
- Yang Xizong, 79, Chinese politician, Governor of Sichuan province and Communist Party Chief of Henan province.

=== 22 ===
- Derek Bazalgette, 83, British admiral.
- Sir John Harrison Burnett, 85, British academic, Principal of Edinburgh University (1979–1987).
- Carmelo Camet, 102, Argentine Olympic fencer (1928), and oldest living former Olympian.
- Mike Coolbaugh, 35, American baseball first base coach for the Tulsa Drillers, struck in neck by foul ball.
- Jarrod Cunningham, 38, New Zealand rugby union footballer for London Irish, motor neurone disease.
- Norma Gabler, 84, American textbook campaigner, Parkinson's disease.
- Walter Jona, 81, Australian politician, member of the Victorian Legislative Assembly (1964–1985).
- László Kovács, 74, Hungarian-American cinematographer (Easy Rider, Ghostbusters, Five Easy Pieces).
- André Milongo, 71, Congolese Prime Minister (1991–1992).
- Ulrich Mühe, 54, German actor (The Lives of Others), stomach cancer.
- Juan Sebastián Restrepo, 20, Colombian American soldier and medic.
- Jean Stablinski, 75, French cyclist.
- Rollie Stiles, 100, American oldest living former Major League Baseball player.
- Gerhard Thielcke, 76, German conservationist, BUND co-founder, head injury.

=== 23 ===
- Franco Cuomo, 69, Italian writer.
- Sir Tom Davis, 90, Cook Islander Prime Minister of the Cook Islands (1978–1987).
- Otis Davis, 86, American Major League Baseball player (Brooklyn Dodgers).
- Ernst Otto Fischer, 88, German Nobel Prize–winning chemist.
- Tor Kamata, 70, American professional wrestler (Stampede Wrestling), heart disease.
- Daniel E. Koshland Jr., 87, American scientist, editor of Science magazine (1985–1995), stroke.
- Benjamin Libet, 91, American pioneering scientist in the field of human consciousness.
- Ron Miller, 74, American songwriter ("Touch Me in the Morning", "For Once in My Life"), cardiac arrest.
- Gyani Nand, 64, Fijian politician (FLP, 2001–2006), Minister for Agriculture (2006).
- Joan O'Hara, 76, Irish actress, heart disease.
- Mirsha Serrano, 28, Mexican footballer for Tecos UAG, car accident.
- George Tabori, 93, Hungarian-born British theatre director.
- Mohammed Zahir Shah, 92, Afghan royal, last king of Afghanistan.

=== 24 ===
- Giorgio Anglesio, 85, Italian Olympic fencer (1956).
- Olle Dalman, 85, Swedish Olympic alpine skier (1948, 1952, 1956).
- Eric Davis, 75, English footballer (Plymouth Argyle).
- Albert Ellis, 93, American pioneer in cognitive-behavioral therapy, kidney and heart failure.
- Chaney Kley, 34, American actor (The Shield, Darkness Falls, Legally Blonde), drug overdose.
- Abdullah Mehsud, 31, Pakistani Taliban commander, suicide by hand grenade.
- Geoffrey Nuttall, 95, British historian and Nonconformist minister.
- Riley Ann Sawyers, 2, American murder victim.
- Edward J. Sullivan, 86, American Clerk of Courts for Middlesex County, Massachusetts.
- Charles Whiting, 80, British author and military historian.
- William Young, 107, British airman, last known remaining World War I veteran of the Royal Flying Corps.
- Nicola Zaccaria, 84, Greek operatic bass, Alzheimer's disease.

=== 25 ===
- Bae Hyung-kyu, 42, South Korean pastor, Taliban hostage, shot.
- Danny Bergara, 64, Uruguayan football manager of Stockport County and Brunei, stroke.
- Raymond Bristow, 98, British priest, longest-serving Anglican minister.
- Jake, 12, American search and rescue dog for September 11, 2001 attacks and Hurricane Katrina, cancer.
- Bernd Jakubowski, 54, German footballer (East Germany) and Olympian (1980), after short illness.
- Jesse Marunde, 27, American strongman, heart attack.

=== 26 ===
- George Brown, 65, Belizean Chief Justice (1990–1998), illness.
- Lars Forssell, 79, Swedish author and member of the Swedish Academy.
- Eleanor Josephine Macdonald, 101, American cancer researcher.
- John Normington, 70, British actor (Atonement, Doctor Who, Rollerball), pancreatic cancer.
- Skip Prosser, 56, American college basketball coach for Wake Forest University, heart attack.
- Shambo, 6, British Hindu sacred bull, lethal injection due to bovine tuberculosis.
- Luis Alberto Villamizar Cárdenas, 62, Colombian politician (NL) and diplomat, complications of lung surgery.

=== 27 ===
- Gabriel Cisneros, 66, Spanish politician (PP), co-author of the 1978 Constitution, complications from stroke.
- Lucky Grills, 79, Australian comedian and actor (Bluey).
- Fannie Hillsmith, 96, American cubist painter.
- Abdullah Kurshumi, 75, Yemeni politician, Prime Minister of the Yemen Arab Republic (1969–1970).
- Peter Moyes, 90, Australian educator.
- James Oyebola, 46, British heavyweight boxer, shot.
- Alan Pottasch, 79, American advertising executive for Pepsi, developed Pepsi Generation ad campaign.
- Christophe Ruer, 42, French Olympic modern pentathlete (1988, 1992, 1996), motorcycle accident.
- William J. Tuttle, 95, American make-up artist (North by Northwest, Singin' in the Rain, Cat on a Hot Tin Roof).

=== 28 ===
- Crown Prince Bảo Long, 71, Vietnamese son of the last Emperor Bảo Đại.
- Kazi Lhendup Dorjee, 102, Indian first chief minister of Sikkim (SNC, 1974–1978), heart attack.
- Karl Gotch, 82, German-born professional wrestler and Olympian (1948).
- Isidore Isou, 82, French poet, film critic and artist.
- Jim LeRoy, 46, American stunt pilot, air crash.
- Sal Mosca, 80, American jazz pianist and educator.

=== 29 ===
- Ian Anstruther, 85, British diplomat, baronet, writer and literary patron.
- Jack Cole, 87, American publisher (Cole Directory), cancer.
- James David, 79, American football player (Detroit Lions), after long illness.
- Art Davis, 73, American jazz double-bassist, heart attack.
- Phil Drabble, 93, British television presenter (One Man and His Dog).
- Carlos Eduardo Albano Feitosa, 66, Brazilian volleyball player and Olympian (1964, 1968).
- Mike Reid, 67, English comedian and actor (EastEnders, Snatch, Yus, My Dear), heart attack.
- Bill Robinson, 64, American baseball player (Braves, Yankees, Phillies and Pirates) and coach.
- Michel Serrault, 79, French actor (La Cage aux Folles), cancer.
- Tom Snyder, 71, American talk show host (The Tomorrow Show, The Late Late Show) and journalist, complications of leukemia.
- Marvin Zindler, 85, American reporter, pancreatic cancer.

=== 30 ===
- Michelangelo Antonioni, 94, Italian film director (L'avventura, Blowup, Zabriskie Point).
- Teoctist Arăpaşu, 92, Romanian Patriarch of the Romanian Orthodox Church, heart attack.
- Ingmar Bergman, 89, Swedish film director (The Seventh Seal, Wild Strawberries, Fanny and Alexander), Oscar winner (1961, 1962, 1984).
- Fausto Sucena Rasga Filho, 78, Brazilian Olympic basketball player.
- Tam McGraw, 54, British mobster, heart attack.
- Ali Meshkini, 85, Iranian Chairman of the Assembly of Experts, respiratory and kidney complications.
- Anne O'Brien, 95, American Olympic athlete.
- Makoto Oda, 75, Japanese writer and anti-war activist, cancer.
- Sean Stokes, 24, United States Marine.
- Richard Stott, 63, British newspaper editor and author, pancreatic cancer.
- Shim Sung-Min, 29, South Korean Taliban hostage, shot.
- Bill Walsh, 75, American Hall of Fame football coach (San Francisco 49ers), leukemia.
- Wen Xingyu, 65, Chinese comedian, lung cancer.

=== 31 ===
- Margaret Avison, 89, Canadian poet.
- Manuel Baiget, 61, Spanish Olympic sailor (1968).
- Giuseppe Baldo, 93, Italian footballer and Olympian (1936).
- J. Esmonde Barry, 83, Canadian healthcare activist and political commentator, complications from a heart attack.
- Martin Bristow, 93, British rower and Olympian (1936).
- Norman Cohn, 92, British historian, degenerative heart condition.
- Oliver Morgan, 74, American rhythm & blues vocalist, heart attack.
- R. D. Wingfield, 79, British writer and radio dramatist.
