= 1951 in the United States =

- Decades: 1930s; 1940s; 1950s; 1960s; 1970s
- See also: History of the United States (1945–1964); Timeline of United States history (1950–1969); List of years in the United States

Events from the year 1951 in the United States.

== Incumbents ==
=== Federal government ===
- President: Harry S. Truman (D-Missouri)
- Vice President: Alben W. Barkley (D-Kentucky)
- Chief Justice: Fred M. Vinson (Kentucky)
- Speaker of the House of Representatives: Sam Rayburn (D-Texas)
- Senate Majority Leader:

Scott W. Lucas (D-Illinois) (until January 3)
Ernest McFarland (D-Arizona) (starting January 3)

- Congress: 81st (until January 3), 82nd (starting January 3)

==== State governments ====
Governors and lieutenant governors

=== Governors ===
- Governor of Alabama: Jim Folsom (Democratic) (until January 15), Gordon Persons (Democratic) (starting January 15)
- Governor of Arizona: Dan Edward Garvey (Democratic) (until January 1), John Howard Pyle (Republican) (starting January 1)
- Governor of Arkansas: Sid McMath (Democratic)
- Governor of California: Earl Warren (Republican)
- Governor of Colorado: Walter Walford Johnson (Democratic) (until January 9), Daniel I. J. Thornton (Republican) (starting January 9)
- Governor of Connecticut: Chester Bowles (Democratic) (until January 3), John Davis Lodge (Republican) (starting January 3)
- Governor of Delaware: Elbert N. Carvel (Democratic)
- Governor of Florida: Fuller Warren (Democratic)
- Governor of Georgia: Herman Talmadge (Democratic)
- Governor of Idaho: C. A. Robins (Republican) (until January 1), Len Jordan (Republican) (starting January 1)
- Governor of Illinois: Adlai E. Stevenson II (Democratic)
- Governor of Indiana: Henry F. Schricker (Democratic)
- Governor of Iowa: William S. Beardsley (Republican)
- Governor of Kansas: Frank L. Hagaman (Republican) (until January 8), Edward F. Arn (Republican) (starting January 8)
- Governor of Kentucky: Lawrence W. Wetherby (Democratic)
- Governor of Louisiana: Earl K. Long (Democratic)
- Governor of Maine: Frederick G. Payne (Republican)
- Governor of Maryland: William Preston Lane, Jr. (Democratic) (until January 10), Theodore R. McKeldin (Republican) (starting January 10)
- Governor of Massachusetts: Paul A. Dever (Democratic)
- Governor of Michigan: G. Mennen Williams (Democratic)
- Governor of Minnesota: Luther W. Youngdahl (Republican) (until September 27), C. Elmer Anderson (Republican) (starting September 27)
- Governor of Mississippi: Fielding L. Wright (Democratic)
- Governor of Missouri: Forrest Smith (Democratic)
- Governor of Montana: John W. Bonner (Democratic)
- Governor of Nebraska: Val Peterson (Republican)
- Governor of Nevada: Vail M. Pittman (Democratic) (until January 1), Charles H. Russell (Republican) (starting January 1)
- Governor of New Hampshire: Sherman Adams (Republican)
- Governor of New Jersey: Alfred E. Driscoll (Republican)
- Governor of New Mexico: Thomas J. Mabry (Democratic) (until January 1), Edwin L. Mechem (Republican) (starting January 1)
- Governor of New York: Thomas Dewey (Republican)
- Governor of North Carolina: W. Kerr Scott (Democratic)
- Governor of North Dakota: Fred G. Aandahl (Republican) (until January 3), Clarence Norman Brunsdale (Republican) (starting January 3)
- Governor of Ohio: Frank J. Lausche (Democratic)
- Governor of Oklahoma: Roy J. Turner (Democratic) (until January 8), Johnston Murray (Democratic) (starting January 8)
- Governor of Oregon: Douglas McKay (Republican)
- Governor of Pennsylvania: James H. Duff (Republican) (until January 16), John S. Fine (Republican) (starting January 16)
- Governor of Rhode Island: John S. McKiernan (Democratic) (until January 2), Dennis J. Roberts (Democratic) (starting January 2)
- Governor of South Carolina: Strom Thurmond (Democratic) (until January 16), James Francis Byrnes (Democratic) (starting January 16)
- Governor of South Dakota: George T. Mickelson (Republican) (until January 2), Sigurd Anderson (Republican) (starting January 2)
- Governor of Tennessee: Gordon Browning (Democratic)
- Governor of Texas: Allan Shivers (Democratic)
- Governor of Utah: J. Bracken Lee (Republican)
- Governor of Vermont: Harold J. Arthur (Republican) (until January 4), Lee E. Emerson (Republican) (starting January 4)
- Governor of Virginia: John S. Battle (Democratic)
- Governor of Washington: Arthur B. Langlie (Republican)
- Governor of West Virginia: Okey L. Patteson (Democratic)
- Governor of Wisconsin: Oscar Rennebohm (Republican) (until January 1), Walter J. Kohler Jr. (Republican) (starting January 1)
- Governor of Wyoming: Arthur G. Crane (Republican) (until January 1), Frank A. Barrett (Republican) (starting January 1)

=== Lieutenant governors ===
- Lieutenant Governor of Alabama: James C. Inzer (Democratic) (until January 15), James B. Allen (Democratic) (starting January 15)
- Lieutenant Governor of Arkansas: Nathan Green Gordon (Democratic)
- Lieutenant Governor of California: Goodwin Knight (Republican)
- Lieutenant Governor of Colorado: Gordon L. Allott (Republican)
- Lieutenant Governor of Connecticut: William T. Carroll (Democratic) (until January 3), Edward N. Allen (Republican) (starting January 3)
- Lieutenant Governor of Delaware: Alexis I. du Pont Bayard (Democratic)
- Lieutenant Governor of Georgia: Marvin Griffin (Democratic)
- Lieutenant Governor of Idaho: Donald S. Whitehead (Republican) (until January 1), Edson H. Deal (Republican) (starting January 1)
- Lieutenant Governor of Illinois: Sherwood Dixon (Democratic)
- Lieutenant Governor of Indiana: John A. Watkins (Democratic)
- Lieutenant Governor of Iowa: Kenneth A. Evans (Republican) (until month and day unknown), William H. Nicholas (Republican) (starting month and day unknown)
- Lieutenant Governor of Kansas: vacant (until January 8), Fred Hall (Republican) (starting January 8)
- Lieutenant Governor of Kentucky: vacant (until month and day unknown), Emerson Beauchamp (Democratic) (starting month and day unknown)
- Lieutenant Governor of Louisiana: William J. Dodd (Democratic)
- Lieutenant Governor of Massachusetts: Charles F. Sullivan (Democratic)
- Lieutenant Governor of Michigan: John W. Connolly (Democratic) (until January 1), William C. Vandenberg (Republican) (starting January 1)
- Lieutenant Governor of Minnesota: C. Elmer Anderson (Republican) (until September 27), vacant (starting September 27)
- Lieutenant Governor of Mississippi: Sam Lumpkin (Democratic)
- Lieutenant Governor of Missouri: James T. Blair, Jr. (Democratic)
- Lieutenant Governor of Montana: Paul Cannon (Democratic)
- Lieutenant Governor of Nebraska: Charles J. Warner (Republican)
- Lieutenant Governor of Nevada: Clifford A. Jones (Democratic)
- Lieutenant Governor of New Mexico: Joseph Montoya (Democratic) (until January 1), Tibo J. Chavez (Democratic) (starting January 1)
- Lieutenant Governor of New York: Frank C. Moore (Republican) (starting January 1)
- Lieutenant Governor of North Carolina: Hoyt Patrick Taylor (Democratic)
- Lieutenant Governor of North Dakota: Clarence P. Dahl (Republican) (until January 3), Ray Schnell (Republican) (starting January 3)
- Lieutenant Governor of Ohio: George D. Nye (Democratic)
- Lieutenant Governor of Oklahoma: James E. Berry (Democratic)
- Lieutenant Governor of Pennsylvania: Daniel B. Strickler (Republican) (until January 16), Lloyd H. Wood (Republican) (starting January 16)
- Lieutenant Governor of Rhode Island: John S. McKiernan (Democratic)
- Lieutenant Governor of South Carolina: George Bell Timmerman, Jr. (Democratic)
- Lieutenant Governor of South Dakota: Rex A. Terry (Republican)
- Lieutenant Governor of Tennessee: Walter M. Haynes (Democratic)
- Lieutenant Governor of Texas: vacant (until January 16), Ben Ramsey (Democratic) (starting January 16)
- Lieutenant Governor of Vermont: vacant (until January 4), Joseph B. Johnson (Republican) (starting January 4)
- Lieutenant Governor of Virginia: Lewis Preston Collins II (Democratic)
- Lieutenant Governor of Washington: Victor A. Meyers (Democratic)
- Lieutenant Governor of Wisconsin: George M. Smith (Republican)

== Events ==
=== January–March ===
- January 1 – First week of Patti Page's hit song "Tennessee Waltz" as No. 1 single on Billboard and Cashbox charts.
- January 10 – The new United Nations headquarters officially opens in New York City.
- January 17 – Korean War: Chinese and North Korean forces capture Seoul.
- January 27 – Nuclear testing at the Nevada Test Site begins with a 1-kiloton bomb dropped on Frenchman Flat, northwest of Las Vegas.
- January 31 – The last daily narrow gauge passenger train, the San Juan Express, is retired by the Denver and Rio Grande Western Railroad.
- February 21 – The Jack in the Box fast-food restaurant chain is founded by Robert O. Peterson in San Diego, California.
- February 27 – The Twenty-second Amendment to the United States Constitution, limiting presidents to two terms, is ratified.
- March 2 – The first NBA All-Star Game of basketball is played in the Boston Garden.
- March 3 or 5 – Jackie Brenston "and His Delta Cats" (actually Ike Turner's Kings of Rhythm) record "Rocket 88" at Sam Phillips' Sun Studio in Memphis, Tennessee, a candidate for the first rock and roll record (released in April). It is covered on June 14 by Bill Haley and His Saddlemen.
- March 12 – Hank Ketcham's best-selling comic strip Dennis the Menace appears in newspapers across the U.S. for the first time.
- March 14 – Korean War: For the second time, United Nations troops recapture Seoul.
- March 29
  - Ethel and Julius Rosenberg are convicted of conspiracy to commit espionage. On April 5 they are sentenced to receive the death penalty.
  - Rodgers and Hammerstein's The King and I opens on Broadway and runs for three years. It is the first Rodgers & Hammerstein musical specifically written for an actress (Gertrude Lawrence). Lawrence is stricken with cancer during the run of the show and dies halfway through its run a year later. The show makes a star of Yul Brynner.
  - The 23rd Academy Awards ceremony, hosted by Fred Astaire, is held at RKO Pantages Theatre in Hollywood, Los Angeles. Joseph L. Mankiewicz's All About Eve wins six awards, including Best Motion Picture and Mankiewicz's second consecutive Best Director win. The film is also nominated for 14 awards overall, breaking the record of 13 set by 1939's Gone with the Wind.
- March 31 – Remington Rand delivers the first UNIVAC I computer to the United States Census Bureau.

=== April–June ===
- April 7 – Operation Greenhouse: The first thermonuclear burn is carried out on Enewetak Atoll in the Marshall Islands of the Pacific by the U.S. Three further tests in this series take place up to May 24.
- April 11 – U.S. President Harry S. Truman relieves General Douglas MacArthur of his Far Eastern commands.
- April 27 – RKO releases the Howard Hawks sci-fi film The Thing from Another World.
- May 3 – The U.S. Senate Committee on Armed Services and U.S. Senate Committee on Foreign Relations begins its closed door hearings into the dismissal of General Douglas MacArthur by U.S. President Harry S. Truman.
- May 8 - Operation Greenhouse George the world's first thermonuclear burn.
- May 21 – The Ninth Street Show, formally known as the 9th Street Art Exhibition, a gathering of a number of notable artists, marks the stepping-out of the post war New York avant-garde, collectively known as the New York School.
- June 4 – The Foley Square trial concludes review in the U.S. Supreme Court as Dennis v. United States, with a ruling against the defendants (overturned by Yates v. United States in 1957).
- June 14 – The UNIVAC I computer is dedicated by the U.S. Census Bureau.
- June 15–July 1 – In New Mexico, Arizona, California, Oregon, Washington and British Columbia, thousands of hectares of forests are destroyed in fires.
- June 18 – Battle Ground, Washington is incorporated.

=== July–September ===
September 1: ANZUS Treaty

- July 10 – Korean War: Armistice negotiations begin at Kaesong.
- July 11–12 – Cicero race riot of 1951: A mob of 4,000 whites attack an apartment building housing a single black family in a neighborhood in Cicero, Illinois.
- July 13
  - The Great Flood of 1951 reaches its highest point in Northeast Kansas, culminating in the greatest flood damage to date in the Midwestern United States.
  - MGM's Technicolor film version of Show Boat, starring Kathryn Grayson, Ava Gardner, and Howard Keel, premieres at Radio City Music Hall in New York City. The musical brings overnight fame to African American bass-baritone William Warfield (who sings Ol' Man River in the film).
- July 14 – In Joplin, Missouri, the George Washington Carver National Monument becomes the first United States National Monument to honor an African American.
- July 16 – J. D. Salinger's coming-of-age story The Catcher in the Rye is published by Little, Brown and Company in New York City.
- July 17 – Western New England College in Springfield, Massachusetts is chartered.
- July 26 – Walt Disney's 13th animated feature film, Alice in Wonderland, premieres in London, United Kingdom. Though the film is not well received critically upon release, it later garners more acclaim from the psychedelic era onwards as a cult classic.
- July 30 – David Lean's Oliver Twist is finally shown in the United States, after 10 minutes of supposedly anti-Semitic references and closeups of Alec Guinness as Fagin are cut. It will not be shown uncut in the U.S. until 1970.
- September 1 – The United States, Australia and New Zealand all sign a mutual defense pact, called the ANZUS Treaty.
- September 3 – The American soap opera Search for Tomorrow debuts on CBS. The show switches to NBC on March 26, 1982, and airs its final episode on December 26, 1986.
- September 8
  - Treaty of San Francisco: In San Francisco, 48 nations sign a peace treaty with Japan to formally end the Pacific War.
  - Japan-U.S. Security Treaty, which allows United States Armed Forces being stationed in Japan after the occupation of Japan, is signed by Japan and the United States.
- September 18
  - 20th Century Fox's Robert Wise science fiction film The Day the Earth Stood Still is released.
  - Elia Kazan's adaptation of the Tennessee Williams play A Streetcar Named Desire premieres, becoming a critical and box-office smash.
- September 20 – NATO accepts Greece and Turkey as members.
- September 24 – MGM releases the musical Show Boat.

=== October–December ===
September 8: Treaty of San Francisco officially ends war with Japan

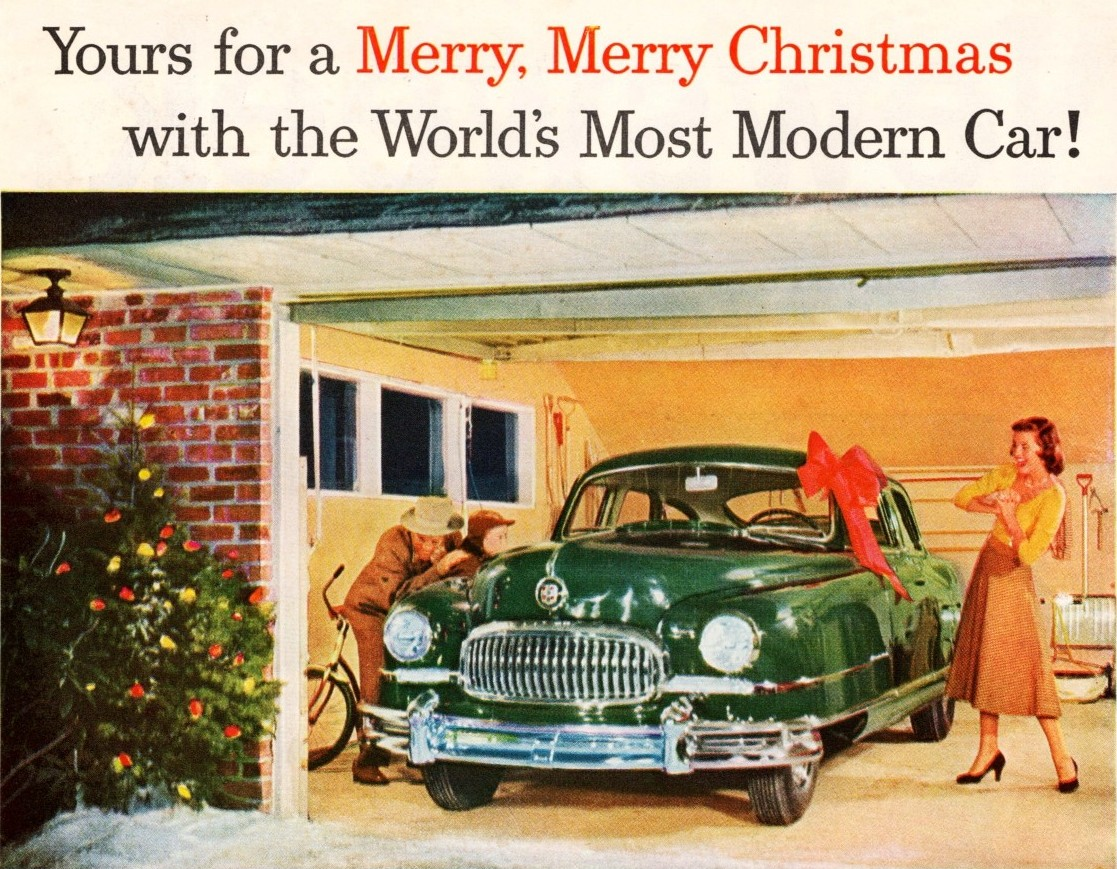
December 1951 ad for Nash Ambassador

- October 3 – "Shot Heard 'Round the World": One of the greatest moments in Major League Baseball history occurs when the New York Giants' Bobby Thomson hits a game winning home run in the bottom of the 9th inning off of Brooklyn Dodgers pitcher Ralph Branca, to win the National League pennant after being down 14 games.
- October 4
  - MGM's Technicolor musical film, An American in Paris, starring Gene Kelly and Leslie Caron and directed by Vincente Minnelli, premieres in New York. It will go on to win six Academy Awards, including Best Picture.
  - Shoppers World (one of the first shopping malls in the U.S.) opens in Framingham, Massachusetts.
- October 10 – The New York Yankees defeat the New York Giants (baseball), 4 games to 2, to win the 14th World Series Title.
- October 15 – Sitcom I Love Lucy, starring Lucille Ball and her husband Desi Arnaz, makes its television debut on CBS.
- October 16 – Judy Garland begins her legendary concerts in New York's Palace Theatre (Broadway).
- October 17 – CBS' Eye logo premieres on television.
- October 20 – The "Johnny Bright incident", an assault on an African American player, occurs in a college football game at Stillwater, Oklahoma.
- October 24 – U.S. President Harry Truman declares an official end to war with Germany.
- November 1 – The first military exercises for nuclear warfare, with infantry troops included, are held in the Nevada desert.
- November 5 – The New Jersey Turnpike is opened.
- November 10 – Direct dial coast-to-coast telephone service begins.
- November 11 – Monogram Pictures releases the sci-fi film Flight to Mars in the United States.
- November 22 – Paramount Pictures releases George Pal science fiction film When Worlds Collide.
- November 24 – The Broadway play Gigi opens, starring little known actress Audrey Hepburn as the lead character.
- November 28 – The film Scrooge, starring Alastair Sim, premieres in the U.S. under the title of Charles Dickens's original novel, A Christmas Carol.
- c. December – The Institute of War and Peace Studies is established by Dwight D. Eisenhower at Columbia University in New York City (of which he is president) with William T. R. Fox as first director.
- December 13 – A water storage tank collapses in Tucumcari, New Mexico, resulting in 4 deaths and 200 buildings destroyed.
- December 17 – "We Charge Genocide", a petition describing genocide by the U.S. government against African Americans, is delivered to the United Nations.
- December 20 – Experimental Breeder Reactor I (EBR-1), the world's first (experimental) nuclear power plant, opens in Idaho.
- December 23 – John Huston's drama film, The African Queen, starring Humphrey Bogart and Katharine Hepburn, premieres in Hollywood.
- December 24 – Gian Carlo Menotti's 45-minute opera Amahl and the Night Visitors premieres live on NBC, becoming the first opera written especially for television.
- December 31 – The Marshall Plan expires after distributing more than US$13.3 billion in foreign aid to rebuild Europe.

=== Ongoing ===
- Cold War (1947–1991)
- Second Red Scare (1947–1957)
- Marshall Plan (1948–1951)
- Korean War (1950–1953)

=== Unknown ===
- "Vegas Vic" is added to the Pioneer Club, in Las Vegas.

== Births ==
=== January–March ===
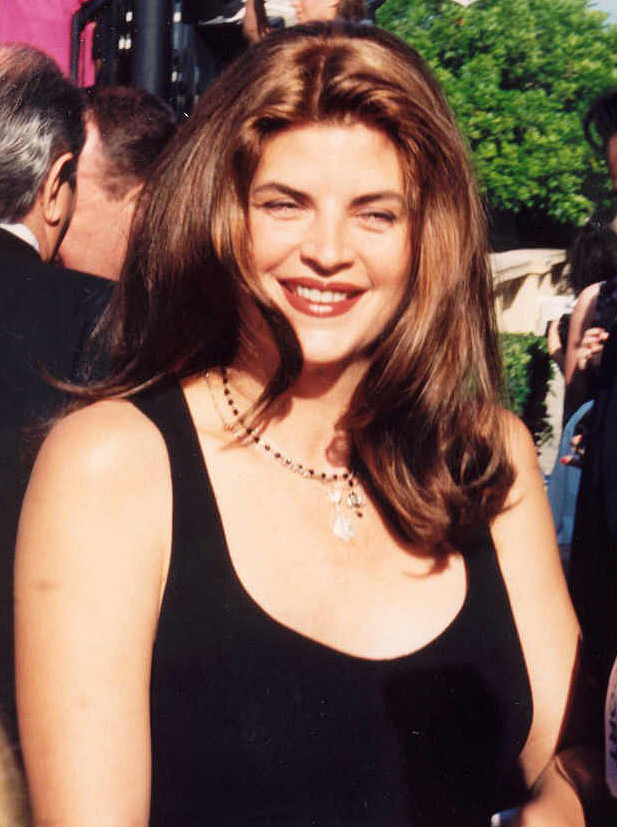
Kirstie Alley

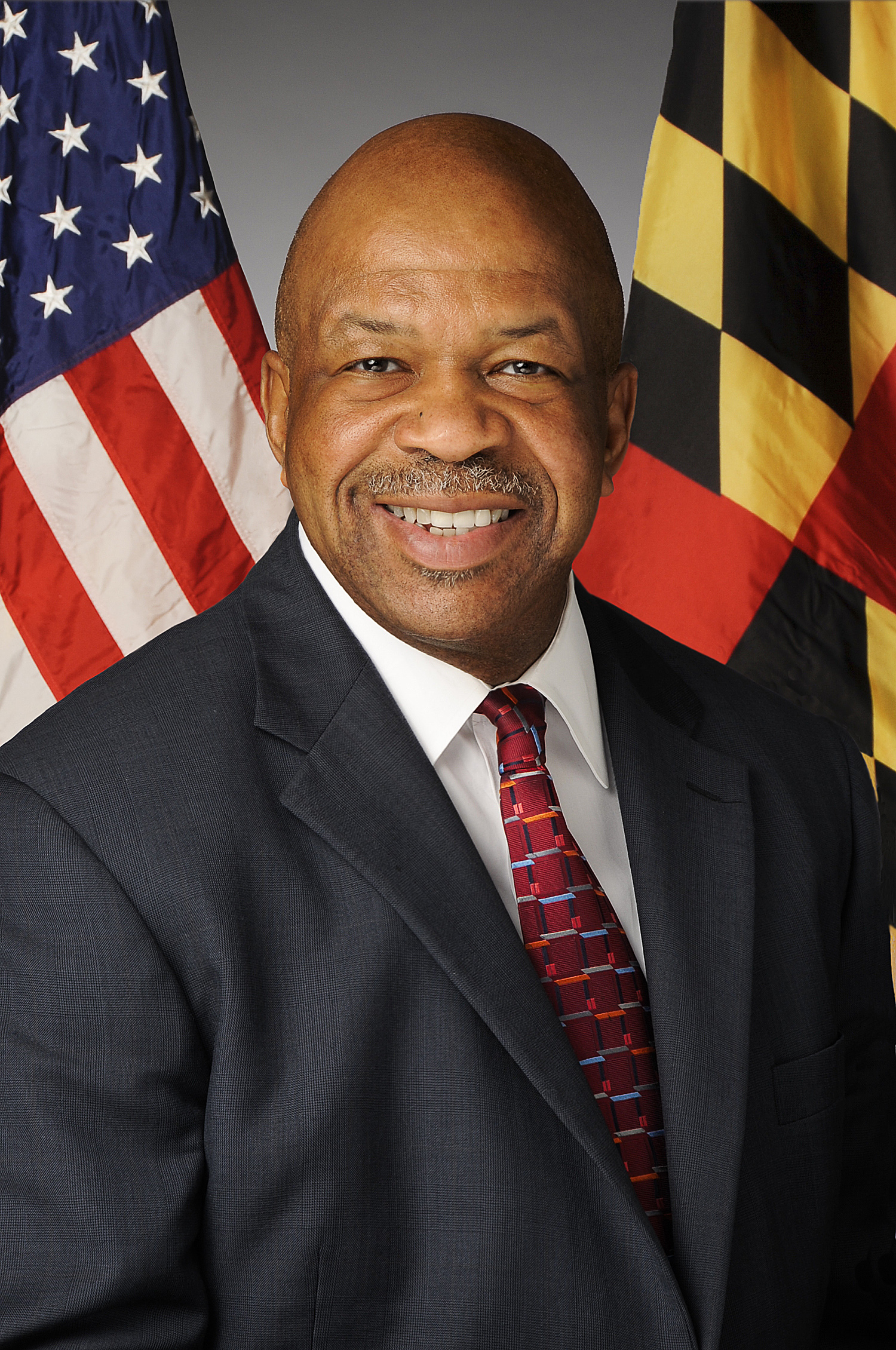
Elijah Cummings

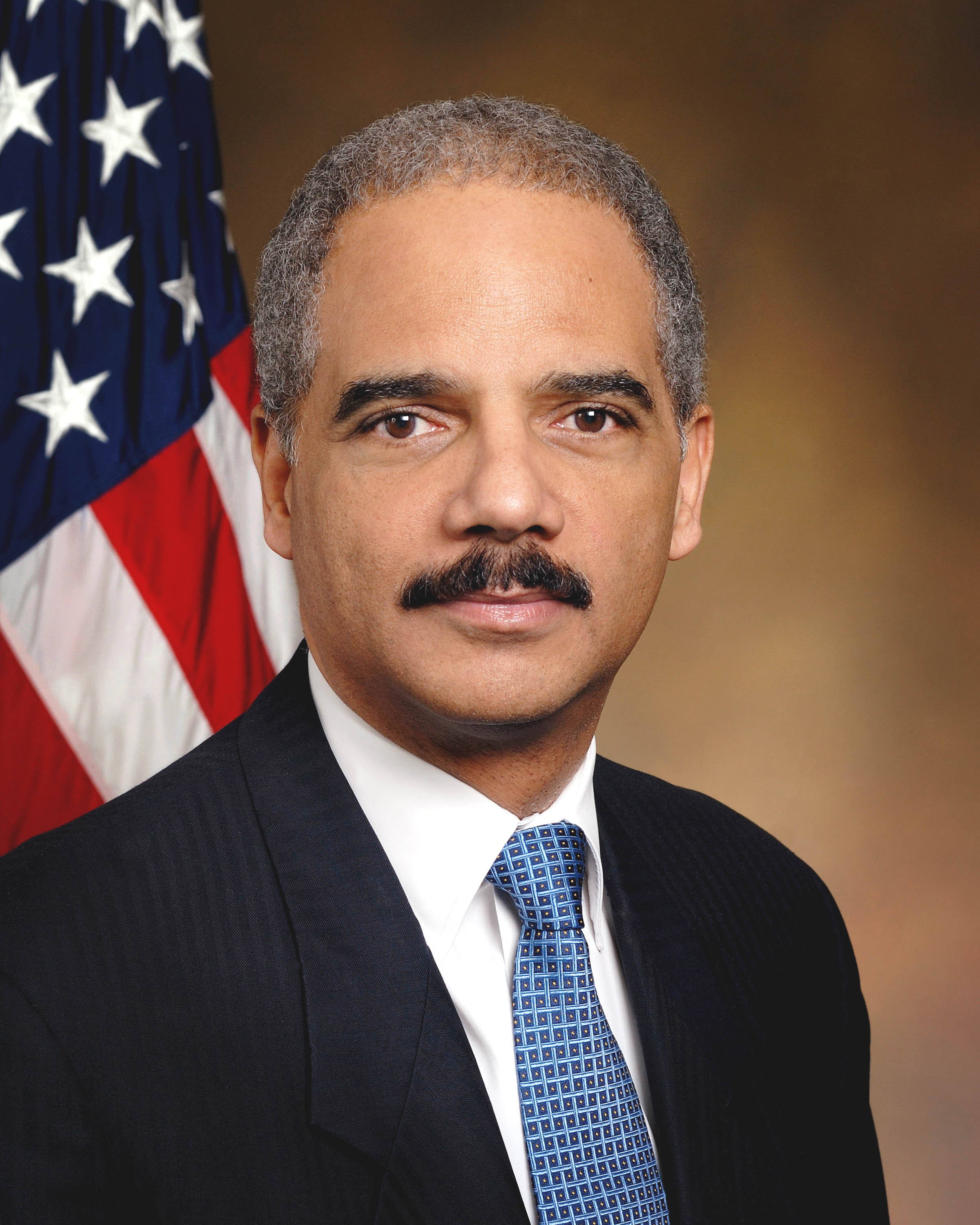
Eric Holder

- January 2 – Jim Essian, baseball player and coach
- January 4
  - Bob Black, author and activist
  - Barbara Cochran, skier
- January 6
  - Don Gullett, baseball player and coach (d. 2024)
  - Kim Wilson, singer, harmonica player
- January 8 – John McTiernan, director, producer and writer
- January 9 – John Prados, historian and war gamer designer (d. 2022)
- January 10 – Tim Seelig, composer
- January 11 – Carol Leigh, author and sex workers' rights activist (d. 2022)
- January 12
  - Kirstie Alley, actress (d. 2022)
  - Chris Bell, guitarist and singer-songwriter (d. 1978)
  - Rush Limbaugh, conservative radio personality (d. 2021)
- January 18 – Elijah Cummings, African American politician (d. 2019)
- January 21 – Eric Holder, African-American politician, 82nd United States Attorney General
- January 22
  - Alveda King, activist, minister, author and politician
  - Leon Roberts, baseball player
- January 23
  - Margaret Bailes, sprinter
  - Michael R. Matz, horse rider and trainer
  - Sully Sullenberger, airline captain
- January 25
  - Steve Prefontaine, runner (d. 1975)
  - Bill Viola, video artist (d. 2024)
- January 27
  - Seth Justman, rock keyboardist (The J. Geils Band)
  - Ken Timbs, wrestler (d. 2004)
- January 28 – Billy Bass Nelson, musician (d. 2026)
- January 30 – Charles S. Dutton, African American actor
- January 31
  - Dave Benton, Aruban-born American singer
  - Harry Wayne Casey, musician, songwriter and producer

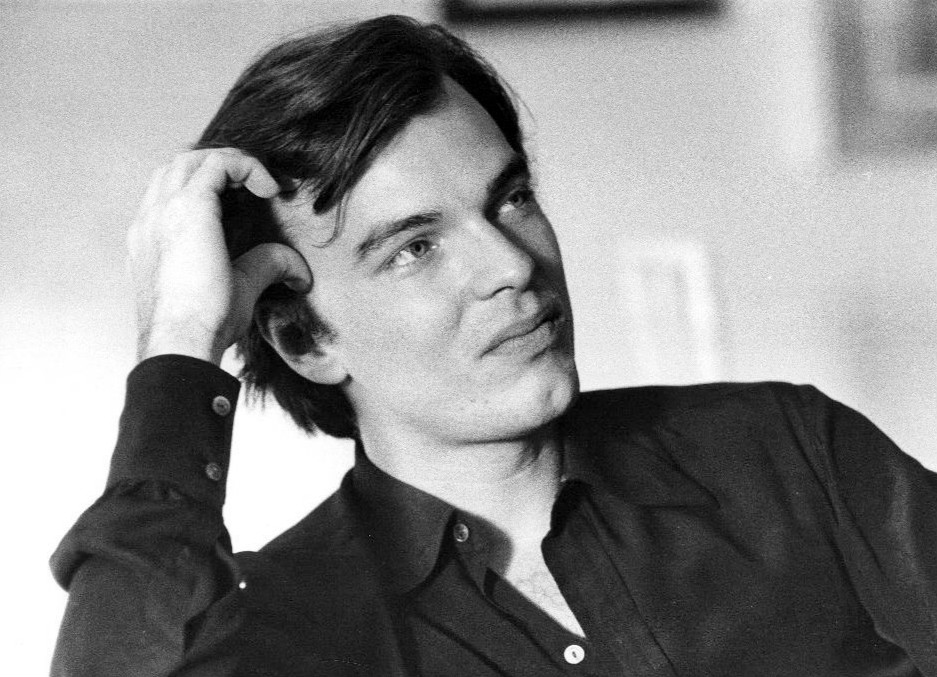
Edward Albert

- February 4 – Phil Ehart, drummer (Kansas)
- February 5 – O'Neal Compton, actor and director (d. 2019)
- February 7 – Kim Milford, actor and singer (d. 1988)
- February 9
  - Jay Inslee, politician
  - David Pomeranz, singer
- February 10 – Bob Iger, CEO of The Walt Disney Company
- February 12
  - Cory Lerios, pianist and vocalist
  - Susan Page, journalist and political commentator
- February 13 – David Naughton, actor (Makin' It) ***
- February 15 – Melissa Manchester, pop singer
- February 16
  - Mike Flanagan, baseball pitcher (died 2011)
  - William Katt, film, television actor (The Greatest American Hero)
- February 19 – Alan Merrill, musician (died 2020)
- February 20 – Edward Albert, film and television actor (died 2006)
- February 22 – Ellen Greene, actress
- February 23 – Patricia Richardson, actress
- February 24 – Debra Jo Rupp, actress (That 70's Show)
- February 27 – Lee Atwater, political activist, campaign strategist and presidential advisor (d. 1991)

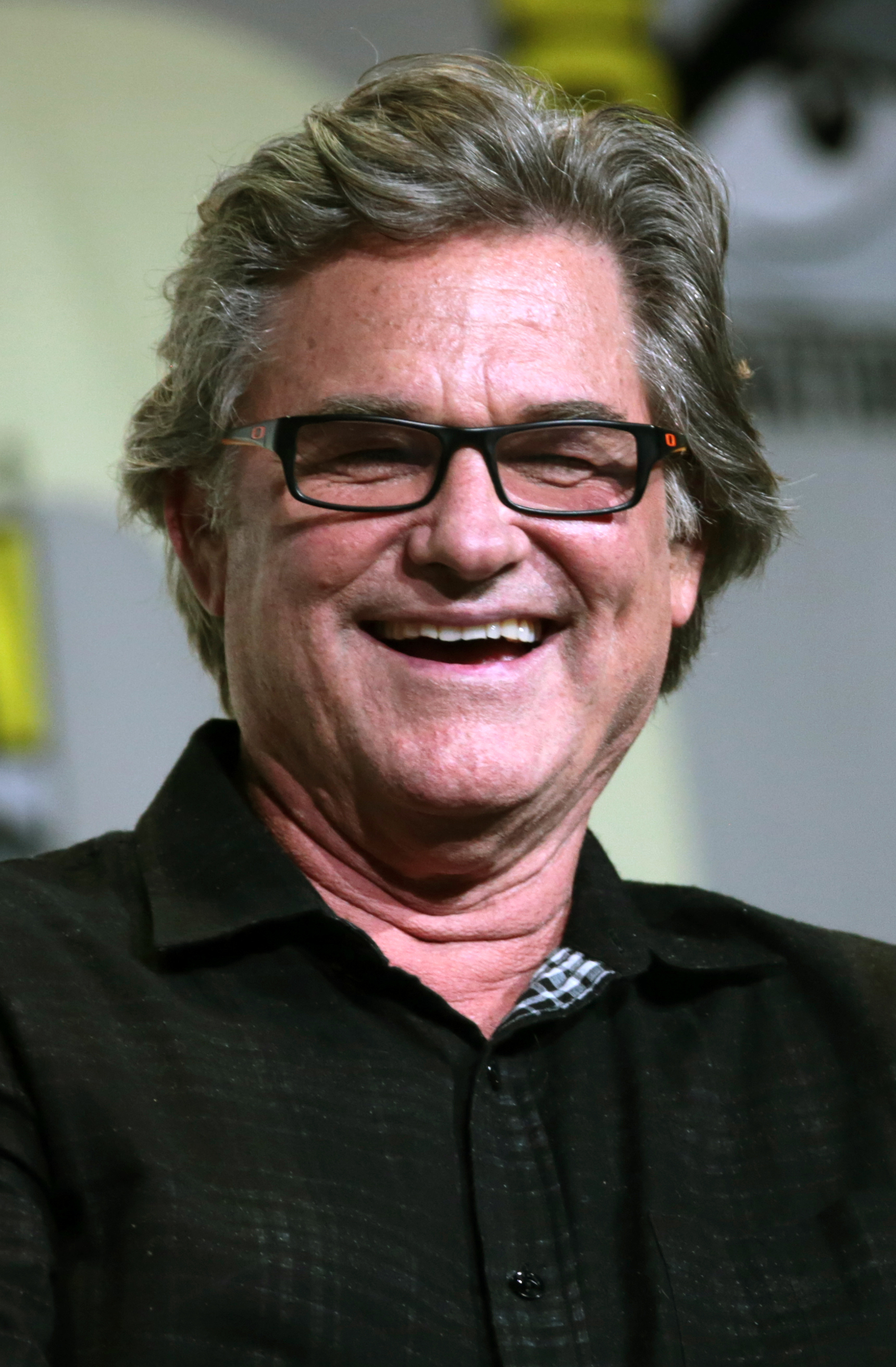
Kurt Russell

- March 1 – Deb Fischer, politician
- March 4
  - Mike Quarry, light-heavyweight boxer (died 2006)
  - Gwen Welles, actress (died 1993)
- March 8 – Dianne Walker, tap dancer
- March 14 – Jerry Greenfield, co-founder of Ben & Jerry's ice cream
- March 17
  - Bill Atkinson, computer scientist (died 2025)
  - Kurt Russell, actor
- March 18
  - Ben Cohen, co-founder of Ben & Jerry's ice cream
  - B. E. Taylor, singer (d. 2016)
- March 19 – Fred Berry, actor (d. 2003)
- March 20 – Jimmie Vaughan, blues rock guitarist and singer
- March 24 – Tommy Hilfiger, fashion designer
- March 26 – Carl Wieman, physicist, Nobel Prize laureate

=== April–June ===
- April 1
  - Tim Bassett, basketball player (d. 2018)
  - Frederic Schwartz, American architect, co-designed Empty Sky (d. 2014)
- April 5 – Dean Kamen, inventor, entrepreneur
- April 7 – Janis Ian, folk singer-songwriter
- April 8 – Phil Schaap, radio host (d. 2021)
- April 10 – David Helvarg, journalist, activist
- April 11 – Doris Angleton, socialite, murder victim (d. 1997)
- April 12
  - Alex Briley, disco singer
  - Tom Noonan, film actor
- April 13
  - Peabo Bryson, African American R&B singer-songwriter
  - John Furey, screen actor
  - Max Weinberg, rock drummer
- April 16
  - Mordechai Ben David, Hasidic Jewish singer
  - Bill Walker, 13th Governor of Alaska
- April 20 – Luther Vandross, African American R&B, soul singer-songwriter (d. 2005)
- April 21
  - Tony Danza, actor, comedian (Who's the Boss?)
  - Bob Varsha, sportscaster
- April 23 – Allison Krause, Kent State University shooting victim (d. 1970)
- April 24 – Martha P. Haynes, astronomer and academic
- April 27 – Ace Frehley, rock guitarist (Kiss) (d. 2025)
- April 29 – Dale Earnhardt, race car driver (d. 2001 in auto racing accident)
- May 1 – Sally Mann, photographer
- May 3
  - Christopher Cross, pop rock singer-songwriter ("Sailing")
  - Stewart F. Lane, Broadway producer, director, playwright and actor
- May 4 – Jackie Jackson, African American pop singer (The Jackson 5)
- May 9 – Joy Harjo, Native American poet
- May 12 – Joe Nolan, baseball player
- May 13
  - Sharon Sayles Belton, Mayor of Minneapolis
  - Guy Morriss, American football coach and player (d. 2022)
- May 15
  - Jonathan Richman, proto-punk singer-songwriter and guitarist
  - Frank Wilczek, physicist, Nobel Prize laureate
- May 19
  - Joey Ramone, rock musician (Ramones) (d. 2001)
  - Dick Slater, professional wrestler (d. 2018)
- May 20 – Mike Crapo, U.S. Senator from Idaho from 1999
- May 21
  - Al Franken, comedian (Saturday Night Live) and U.S. Senator from Minnesota from 2009 to 2018
  - Bob Gale, film screenwriter, producer and director
- May 23 – Jill E. Barad, businessperson
- May 26 – Sally Ride, First American woman astronaut (d. 2012)
- May 28 – JoAnne A. Epps, legal scholar and academic (d. 2023)
- May 30
  - Garrett Hongo, poet
  - Stephen Tobolowsky, screen actor
- May 31 – Jimmy Nalls, jazz fusion guitarist (Sea Level) (d. 2017)
- June 2
  - Gilbert Baker, artist and activist, creator of the Rainbow flag in 1978 (d. 2017)
  - Jeanine Pirro, attorney, politician and conservative political commentator
- June 3 – Jill Biden, First Lady of the United States
- June 5 – Suze Orman, financial advisor, writer and television personality
- June 6 – Dwight Twilley, pop/rock singer and songwriter (d. 2023)
- June 8 – Tony Rice, bluegrass musician (d. 2020)
- June 9
  - Bruce Duffy, author (d. 2022)
  - James Newton Howard, film composer
  - Dave Parker, baseball player (d. 2025)
- June 12 – Brad Delp, rock vocalist (Boston) (d. 2007)
- June 13 – Richard Thomas, television actor (The Waltons)
- June 15 – Jane Amsterdam, magazine editor
- June 16 – Charlie Dominici, progressive metal singer (d. 2023)
- June 18 – Steve Miner, screen director and producer
- June 20 – Tress MacNeille, voice actress
- June 21 – Nils Lofgren, rock musician
- June 24
  - Leslie Cochran, homeless activist and Austin icon (d. 2012)
  - Ken Reitz, baseball player (d. 2021)
- June 27
  - Julia Duffy, actress
  - K. L. Brown, Alabamian politician
- June 28 – Lloyd Maines, country musician, record producer
- June 29
  - Keno Don Rosa, comic book author
  - Craig Sager, sports commentator (d. 2016)
- June 30 – Stanley Clarke, jazz fusion bass guitarist

=== July–September ===
- July 1
  - Daryl Anderson, television actor
  - Anne Feeney, folk singer (d. 2021)
  - Terrence Mann, actor and dancer
- July 2
  - Anne Garrels, journalist (d. 2022)
  - Keith Marshall, baseball player
  - Sylvia Rivera, transgender activist (d. 2002)
  - Stevie Woods, R&B singer (d. 2014)
- July 3 – Bob Rigby, soccer goalkeeper
- July 4 – Vincent Marzello, screen actor (d. 2020)
- July 5
  - Goose Gossage, baseball player
  - Roger Wicker, politician
- July 7 – Roz Ryan, actress and voice actress
- July 8 – Anjelica Huston, screen actress
- July 9 – Chris Cooper, screen actor
- July 10 – Cheryl Wheeler, folk singer-songwriter
- July 11
  - Yechiel Eckstein, rabbi (d. 2019)
  - Ed Ott, baseball player (d. 2024)
- July 12
  - Brian Grazer, film producer
  - Cheryl Ladd, actress and singer
- July 15 – Jesse Ventura, actor, pro wrestler, and politician
- July 17 – Lucie Arnaz, actress and singer
- July 19 – Debra Byrd, vocalist (d. 2024)
- July 21 – Robin Williams, actor and comedian (d. 2014)
- July 22
  - Tisa Farrow, film actress (died 2024)
  - Slick Watts, basketball player (died 2025)
- July 23 – Michael McConnohie, voice actor
- July 24 – Lynda Carter, actress and singer
- July 25 – Angela Jackson, African American poet and playwright
- July 28
  - Doug Collins, basketball player, coach and analyst
  - Garrett Hongo, poet
- July 31 – Barry Van Dyke, actor, writer, director and presenter
- August 2 – Andrew Gold, pop singer-songwriter and multi-instrumentalist (10cc, Wax) (d. 2011)
- August 3 – Jay North, actor
- August 4 – Lois V. Vierk, composer
- August 6 – Catherine Hicks, television actress
- August 8 – Randy Shilts, journalist and author (d. 1994)
- August 9 – Mike Downey, sports columnist (d. 2024)
- August 12 – Willie Horton, criminal
- August 13 – Dan Fogelberg, singer-songwriter and multi-instrumentalist (d. 2007)
- August 14
  - Slim Dunlap, rock musician (d. 2024)
  - Carl Lumbly, African American screen and voice actor
- August 15 – Bobby Caldwell, singer-songwriter and multi-instrumentalist (d. 2023)
- August 17 – Richard Hunt, puppeteer (d. 1992)
- August 20 – Greg Bear, science fiction author (d. 2022)
- August 21
  - Chesley V. Morton, politician and securities arbitrator
  - Harry Smith, television journalist and editor
  - John Stearns, baseball player (d. 2022)
- August 23
  - Allan Bristow, basketball player and coach
  - Mark Hudson, record producer
  - Jimi Jamison, rock singer-songwriter (Survivor) (d. 2014)
  - Susan L. Solomon, executive and lawyer (d. 2022)
- August 24
  - Orson Scott Card, science fiction author
  - Bill C. Davis, playwright and actor (d. 2021)
- August 26 – Edward Witten, mathematician, Fields medalist
- August 27
  - Mack Brown, college football coach
  - Robert Torricelli, U.S. Senator from New Jersey from 1997 to 2003
- August 28
  - Barbara Hambly, novelist and screenwriter
  - Wayne Osmond, pop singer (d. 2025)
- August 30 – Timothy Bottoms, film actor
- September 2
  - Jim DeMint, U.S. Senator from South Carolina
  - Mark Harmon, screen actor
- September 4 – Judith Ivey, stage actress and director
- September 5 – Michael Keaton, screen actor and director
- September 7
  - Chrissie Hynde, rock singer
  - Bert Jones, football player
- September 11 – Mr. Butch, homeless person and Boston icon (d. 2007)
- September 12 – Joe Pantoliano, screen character actor
- September 13
  - Suzanne Lummis, poet
  - Jean Smart, actress (Designing Women)
  - Linda Wong, pornographic film actress (d. 1987)
- September 15
  - Pete Carroll, football coach
  - Jared Taylor, author and journalist
  - Fred Seibert, screen producer, Frederator Studios founder
- September 17 – Cassandra Peterson, screen actress (Elvira, Mistress of the Dark)
- September 18
  - Ben Carson, African American politician, author and neurosurgeon
  - Dee Dee Ramone, rock bass guitarist (Ramones) (d. 2002)
  - Darryl Stingley, American football player (New England Patriots) (d. 2007)
- September 22 – Amanda Mackey, casting director (d. 2022)
- September 25
  - Pedro Almodóvar, filmmaker
  - Mark Hamill, film and voice actor (Star Wars)
- September 27
  - Jim Shooter, and illustrator
  - David Starobin, guitarist, producer, and director

=== October–December ===
- October 3
  - Bernard Cooper, fiction writer
  - Harold McGee, writer on food science and history
  - Keb' Mo', African American blues musician
  - Kathryn D. Sullivan, astronaut
  - Dave Winfield, baseball player
- October 5 – John Rubey, president of AEG-TV and CEO of Fathom Events and Rubey Entertainment (d. 2025)
- October 7 – John Mellencamp, heartland rock singer-songwriter and instrumentalist
- October 11 – Jon Miller, sports announcer
- October 18
  - Mike Antonovich, ice hockey player and executive
  - Pam Dawber, screen actress
  - Terry McMillan, novelist
- October 25 – Richard Lloyd, rock guitarist
- October 26 – Bootsy Collins, African American funk singer-songwriter and bass guitarist
- October 28 – Ronnie and Donnie Galyon, conjoined twins (d. 2020)
- October 30 – Harry Hamlin, screen actor
- November 1 – Ronald Bell, musician (Kool & the Gang) (d. 2020)
- November 2 – Thomas Mallon, novelist and critic
- November 3 – Ed Murawinski, cartoonist (New York Daily News)
- November 7 – Chris Mortensen, sports journalist (d. 2024)
- November 8 – Tom Henry, businessman and politician (d. 2024)
- November 9 – Lou Ferrigno, film actor and bodybuilder
- November 11 – Marc Summers, television host
- November 14
  - Frankie Banali, rock drummer (d. 2020)
  - Stephen Bishop, singer-songwriter, guitarist and actor
- November 15 – Beverly D'Angelo, actress and singer
- November 16
  - Miguel Sandoval, screen actor
  - Paula Vogel, playwright
- November 17
  - Butch Davis, American football coach
  - Dean Paul Martin, pop singer and screen actor (d. 1987)
  - Stephen Root, screen and voice actor
- November 18 – Justin Raimondo, political activist (d. 2019)
- November 20 – Rodger Bumpass, voice actor (Squidward Tentacles on SpongeBob SquarePants)
- November 21 – John Kennedy, Junior senator from Louisiana
- November 24
  - Chet Edwards, politician
  - Robin Herman, writer and journalist (d. 2022)
- November 27
  - Teri DeSario, disco singer-songwriter
  - Kathryn Bigelow, film director
- November 29 – Roger Troutman, funk singer-songwriter and multi-instrumentalist (d. 1999)
- December 1
  - Sherry Aldridge, singer
  - Obba Babatundé, actor
  - Jaco Pastorius, jazz fusion bass guitarist (d. 1987)
  - Treat Williams, actor, writer and aviator (d. 2023)
- December 2 – Adrian Devine, baseball pitcher (d. 2020)
- December 4
  - Gary Rossington, guitarist and songwriter (d. 2023)
  - Patricia Wettig, screen actress
- December 8 – Bill Bryson, non-fiction author
- December 10 – Johnny Rodriguez, country singer
- December 11 – Peter T. Daniels, writing systems scholar
- December 12 – Greg Lee, basketball player (d. 2022)
- December 18
  - Bobby Jones, basketball player
  - Alvin E. Roth, academic
- December 19 – Karl F. Lopker, business executive (d. 2018)
- December 31 – Tom Hamilton, hard rock bass guitarist and songwriter

== Deaths ==
=== January–March ===
- January 2 – Richard Hart, actor (b. 1915)
- January 10 – Sinclair Lewis, novelist, recipient of Nobel Prize in Literature (b. 1885)
- January 11 – Charles Goddard, playwright and screenwriter (b. 1879)
- January 13 – Florence Kahn, Lady Beerbohm, actress, died in Italy (b. 1878)
- January 18 – Jack Holt, film actor (b. 1888)
- January 22 – Karl Nessler, inventor (b. 1872 in Germany)
- January 28 – Dominic Salvatore Gentile, military pilot, killed in aviation accident (b. 1920)
- February 9 – Eddy Duchin, jazz pianist and bandleader (b. 1909)
- February 13 – Lloyd C. Douglas, novelist (b. 1877)
- February 16 – Tommy Gagliano, mobster (b. 1883)
- February 18 – Lyman Gilmore, aviation pioneer (b. 1874)
- February 22 – Alfred Lindley, Olympic rower (b. 1904)
- February 28 – Henry W. Armstrong, boxer and songwriter (b. 1879)
- March 2 – Al Taylor, film character actor (b. 1887)
- March 8 – Charles Coleman, film character actor (b. 1885 in Australia)
- March 14 – Val Lewton, film producer and screenwriter (b. 1904)
- March 25
  - Eddie Collins, baseball player (Chicago White Sox) (b. 1887)
  - Oscar Micheaux, African American filmmaker (b. 1884)
- March 31 – Ralph Forbes, actor (b. 1896 in the United Kingdom)

=== April–June ===
- April 4 – George Albert Smith, President of the Church of Jesus Christ of Latter-day Saints (b. 1870)
- April 11 – Joe King, film actor (b. 1883)
- April 19 – Frank Hopkins, horseman and soldier (b. 1865)
- April 23 – Charles G. Dawes, 30th vice president of the United States, recipient of Nobel Peace Prize (b. 1865)
- May 5 – Eddie Dunn, comedy film actor (b. 1896)
- May 7 – Warner Baxter, film actor (b. 1889)
- May 8 – Pat Hartigan, film actor and director (b. 1881)
- May 20 – Marguerite Merington, author (b. 1857 in the United Kingdom)
- May 24 – Thomas N. Heffron, silent film director (b. 1872)
- May 29 – Fanny Brice, entertainer (b. 1891)
- June 1 – Monte Collins, actor and screenwriter (b. 1898)
- June 4 – Serge Koussevitzky, orchestral conductor (b. 1874 in Russia)
- June 8 – Olive Tell, actress (b. 1894)
- June 9 – Mayo Methot, actress (b. 1904)
- June 21 – Charles Dillon Perrine, astronomer, discoverer of two moons of Jupiter (b. 1867)
- June 27 – David Warfield, stage actor (b. 1866)

=== July–September ===
- July 9 – Harry Heilmann, baseball player (Detroit Tigers) (b. 1894)
- July 23 – Robert J. Flaherty, filmmaker (b. 1884)
- August 3 – Bee Ho Gray, Wild West star, silent film actor and vaudeville performer (b. 1885)
- August 6 – Anthony Brancato, criminal (b. 1914)
- August 14
  - Bertha Gifford, serial killer (b. 1871)
  - William Randolph Hearst, newspaper magnate (b. 1863)
- August 28 – Robert Walker, film actor (b. 1918)
- September 7 – John Sloan, painter and etcher (b. 1871)
- September 17 – Jimmy Yancey, pianist and composer (b. 1898)
- September 18 – Gelett Burgess, art critic and humorist (b. 1866)
- September 29 – Thomas Cahill, soccer coach (b. 1864)

=== October–December ===
- October 4 – Henrietta Lacks, African American originator of the HeLa cell line (b. 1920)
- October 6 – Otto Fritz Meyerhof, physician and biochemist, recipient of Nobel Prize in Physiology or Medicine (b. 1884 in Germany)
- October 24
  - Al Baker, magician (b. 1874)
  - Clarence Stewart Williams, admiral (b. 1863)
- October 26 – William S. Finucane, businessman and politician (b. 1888)
- November 3 – Richard Wallace, film director (b. 1894)
- November 15 – Robert Elliott, screen character actor (b. 1879)
- November 25 – Harry B. Liversedge, general (b. 1894)
- December 5 – Shoeless Joe Jackson, baseball player (Chicago White Sox) (b. 1887)
- December 6 – Harold Ross, editor, founder of The New Yorker (b. 1892)
- December 12 – Bill Patton, film actor (b. 1894)
- December 19 – Barton Yarborough, radio actor (b. 1900)

== See also ==
- List of American films of 1951
- Timeline of United States history (1950–1969)
