= Garbuglia =

Garbuglia is an Italian surname. Notable people with the surname include:

- Enrico Garbuglia (1900–2007), Italian World War I veteran
- Mario Garbuglia (1927–2010), Italian set designer
