= Gruppo Sportivo Fiamme Oro =

Italian police force sports section

- Sport: 39 disciplines
- Jurisdiction: Italy
- Abbreviation: G.S. Fiamme Oro
- Founded: 1954
- Affiliation: CONI
- Headquarters: Rome
- President: Francesco Montini

Official website
- poliziadistato.it

The Gruppo Sportivo Fiamme Oro is the sport section of the Italian police force Polizia di Stato.

The color of the competition jerseys of the athletes of the Fiamme Oro is crimson, therefore the athletes of the sports group are sometimes called cremisi (Italian for crimson).

== History ==
In 1949, men were being trained for mountain service at the Alpine School of the Public Security Guards in San Candido. At this time, the Austrian Gendarmerie were organizing cross-country skiing races for border police. For this reason, a sports team was created so the personnel could participate in these races and promote competitive sporting activity, including among children, to enhance the national sporting heritage. Years later, the Fiamme Oro was officially founded on August 12, 1954.

At the 1956 Summer Olympics, Ermanno Pignatti became the first Fiamme Oro athlete to win an Olympic medal, winning bronze in weightlifting (middleweight).

In 1981, after a reform, the Fiamme Oro switched from being the Public Security Guards Corps to being the State Police Sports Group.

In 2012, the Fiamme Oro signed an agreement with the Italian Paralympic Committee to include disabled athletes in the group.

As of the 2026 Winter Olympics and Paralympics, 233 Fiamme Oro athletes have won medals at the Olympics (128 at the Summer Olympics, 74 at the Summer Paralympics, 28 at the Winter Olympics, and 3 at the Winter Paralympics).

== Greatest athletes ==
Summer sports	Winter sports	Paralympic sports
Athletics: Alessandro Andrei (Olympic gold medal); Salvatore Antibo (Olympic silver medal); Livio Berruti (Olympic gold medal); Mattia Furlani (Olympic bronze medal); Marcell Jacobs (two Olympic gold medals); Alessandro Lambruschini (Olympic bronze medal); Boxing: Roberto Cammarelle (Olympic gold medal); Fencing: Valentina Vezzali (six Olympic gold medals); Elisa Di Francisca (two Olympic gold medals); Stefano Cerioni (two Olympic gold medals); Gymnastics: Alice D'Amato (Olympic gold medal); Manila Esposito (Olympic silver medal); Elisa Iorio (Olympic silver medal); Sofia Raffaeli (Olympic bronze medal); Giorgia Villa (Olympic silver medal); Modern pentathlon: Daniele Masala (two Olympic gold medals); Rowing: Nicola Sartori (Olympic bronze medal); Shooting: Gabriele Rossetti (Olympic gold medal); Swimming: Thomas Ceccon (Olympic gold medal); Gregorio Paltrinieri (Olympic gold medal); Weightlifting: Ermanno Pignatti (Olympic bronze medal); Antonino Pizzolato (Olympic bronze medal)	Alpine skiing: Karen Putzer (Olympic bronze medal); Daniela Ceccarelli (Olympic gold medal); Cross-country skiing: Federico Pellegrino (Olympic silver medal); Figure skating: Sara Conti (Olympic bronze medal); Daniel Grassl (Olympic bronze medal); Lara Gutmann (Olympic bronze medal); Niccolò Macii (Olympic bronze medal); Speed skating: Elisa Confortola (Olympic gold medal); Enrico Fabris (two Olympic gold medals); Nicola Franceschina (Olympic silver medal); Thomas Nadalini (Olympic gold medal); Arianna Sighel (Olympic silver medal); Curling: Stefania Constantini (Olympic gold medal)	Para-swimming: Antonio Fantin (two Paralympic gold medals); Giulia Ghiretti (Paralympic gold medal); Angela Procida (Paralympic bronze medal); Wheelchair fencing: Andreea Mogoș (Paralympic silver medal); Bebe Vio (two Paralympic gold medals); Para alpine skiing: René De Silvestro (Paralympic gold medal); Para-snowboarding: Jacopo Luchini (Paralympic gold medal)

== Medal table ==
As of the 2026 Winter Olympics and Paralympics

Event	Gold medal	Silver medal	Bronze medal
Summer Olympic Games	46	31	51
Winter Olympic Games	8	5	15
Summer Paralympic Games	23	22	29
Winter Paralympic Games	2	1	0

== Gallery ==
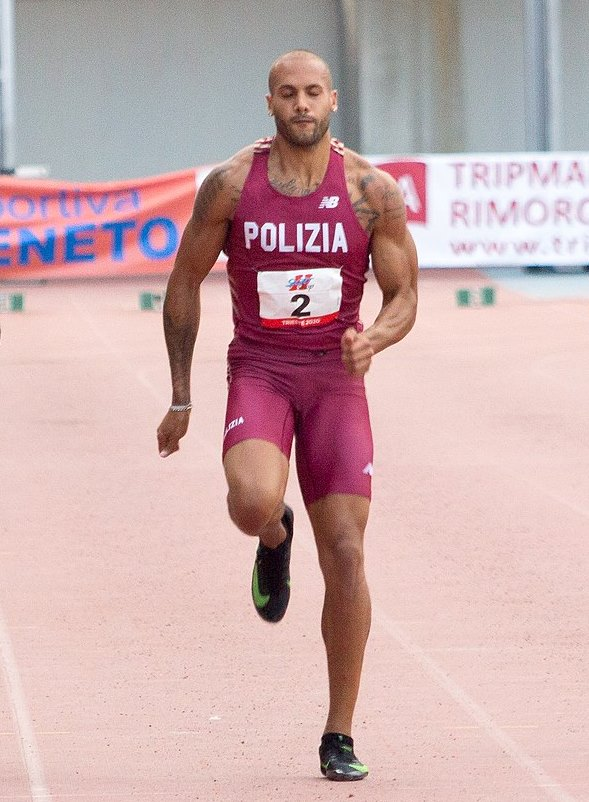
Sprinter Marcell Jacobs, two-time gold medalist as individual and with the team at 2020 Summer Olympics, here in the cremisi jersey of Fiamme Oro.

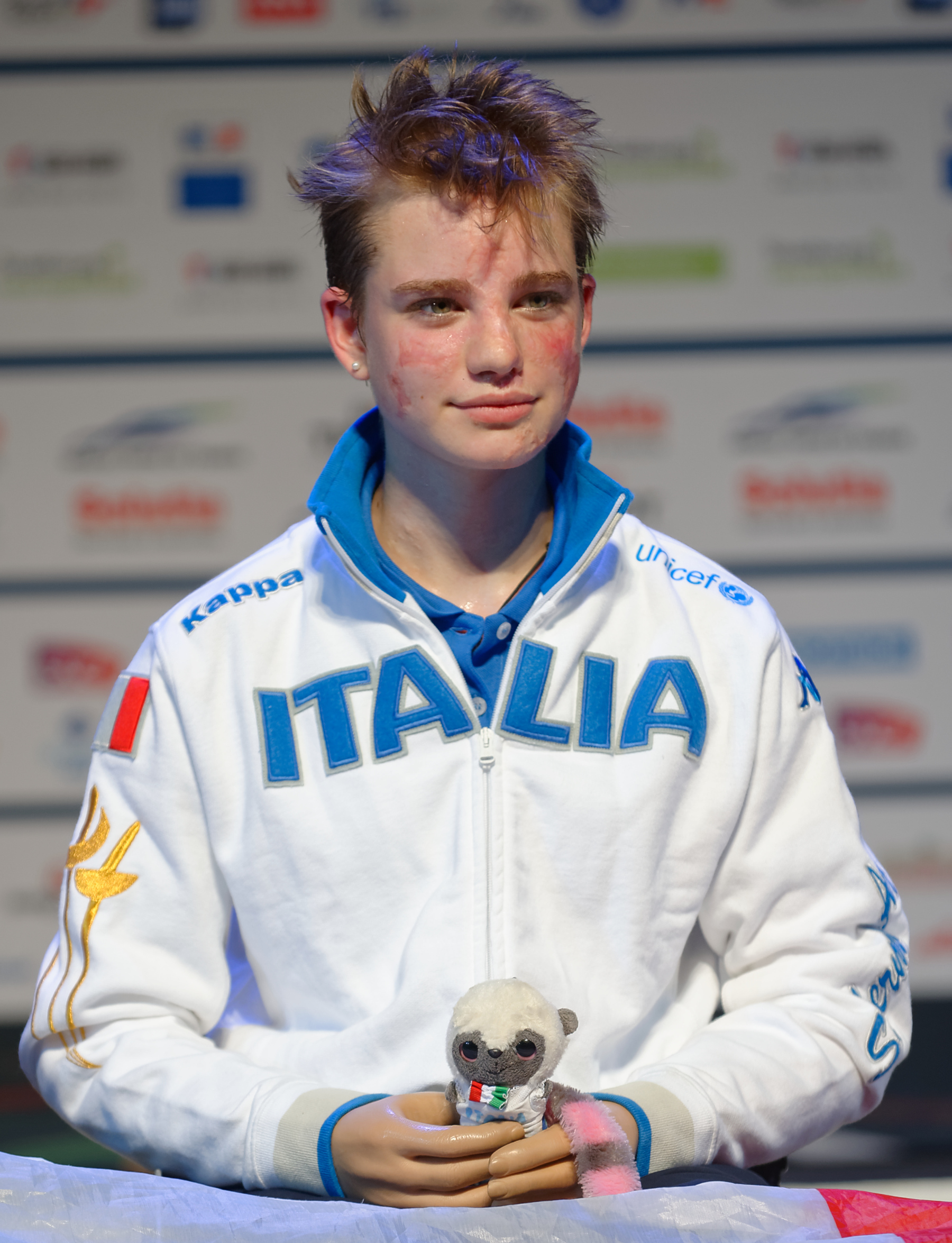
Wheelchair fencer Bebe Vio, two-time Paralympic champion at Rio 2016 and Tokyo 2020.

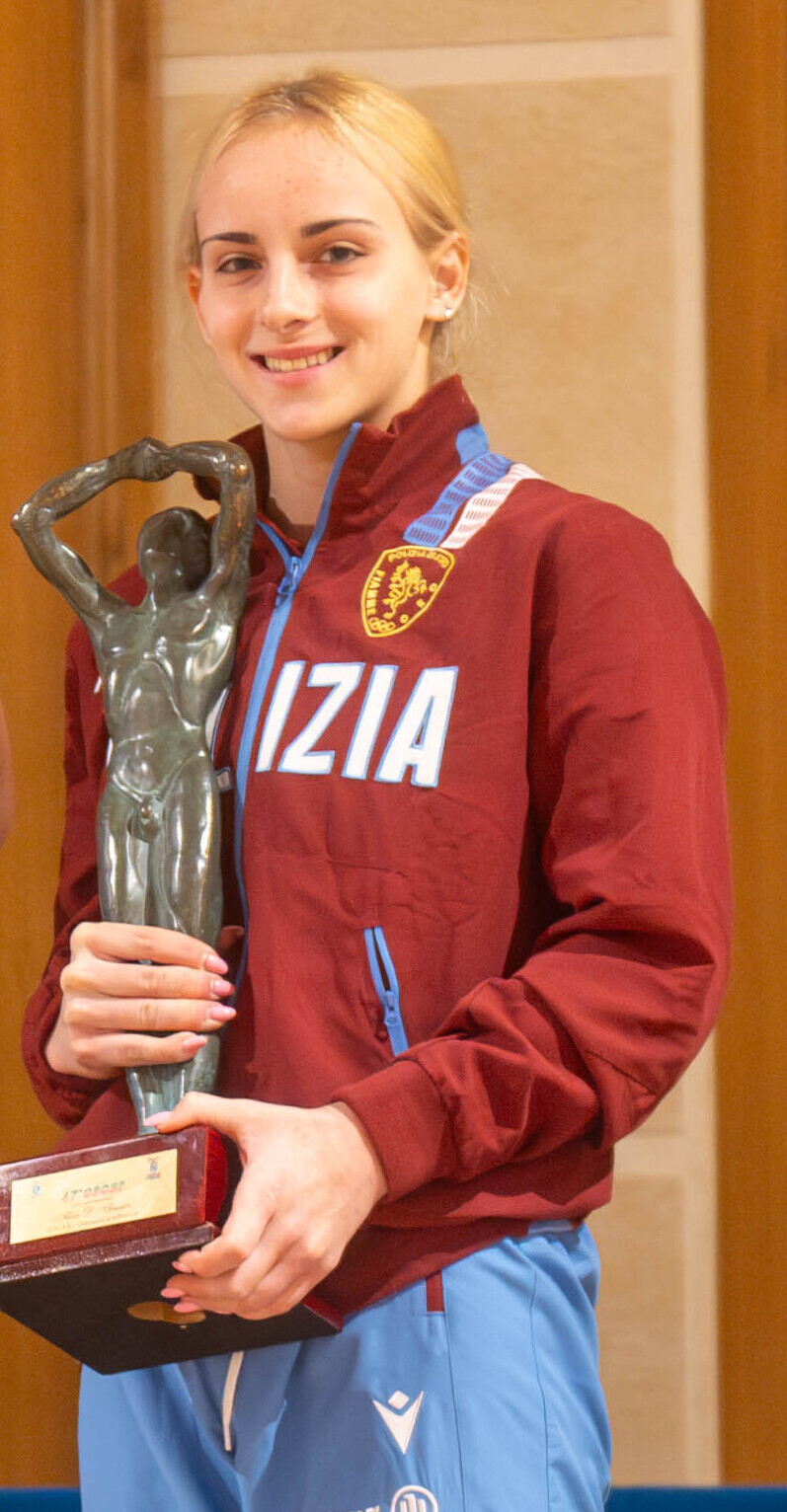
Olympic gold medalist gymnast, Alice D'Amato, wearing her Fiamme Oro jacket at an awards ceremony.

== See also ==
- Polizia di Stato
- Italian military sports bodies
- European Champion Clubs Cup (athletics)
