= Jannie Greeff =

South African weightlifter

Personal information
- Nationality: South African
- Born: 4 December 1935; South Africa
- Died: 12 December 2010 (aged 75)

Sport
- Sport: Weightlifting

Jannie Greeff (4 December 1935 – 12 December 2010) was a South African weightlifter. He competed in the men's middleweight event at the 1956 Summer Olympics.
