= Street people =

People who live a public life on the streets of a city

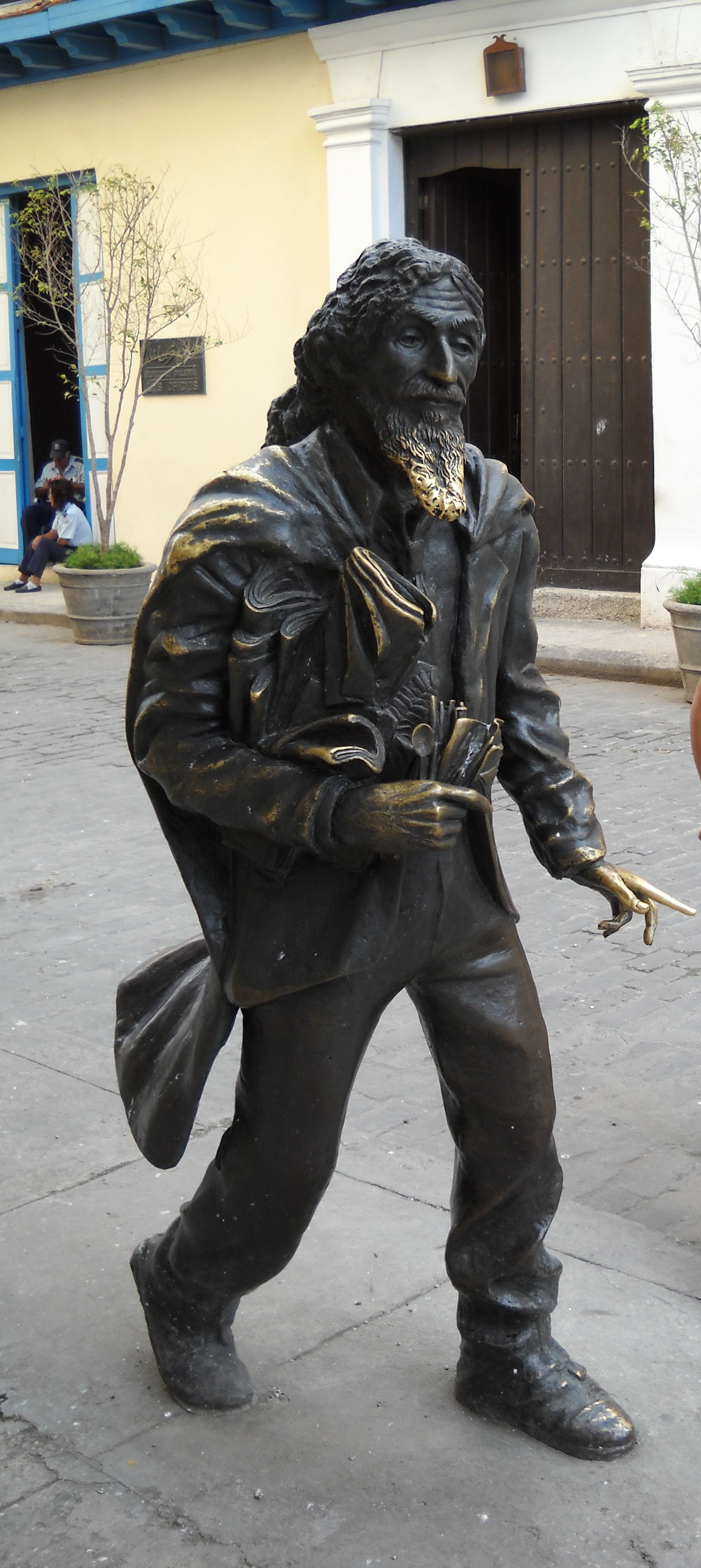
Bronze statue of José María López Lledín known as "El Caballero de Paris" in Havana, Cuba, by sculptor Jose Villa Soberon. Unlike the nearby statue of St. Francis, this statue stands simply on the sidewalk and is a popular tourist attraction. The statue's beard has been polished by the hands of people standing to be photographed with it, for luck.

Street people are people who live a public life on the streets of a city. Street people are frequently homeless, sometimes mentally ill, and often have a transient lifestyle. The delineation of street people is primarily determined by residential arrangement and their location in the urban setting.

== Well-known street people ==
Examples of well-known street people are José María López Lledín who lived a public life on the streets of Havana during the 1950s, Mr. Butch of Boston, Leslie Cochran of Austin, Juan of Seattle, or Louis Thomas Hardin ("Moondog") who was a street musician, inventor, and later homeless person in the 1940s through to 1970s in New York City.

== Character of street people ==
Contemporary street people in the United States include hippies, some of whom may be beggars who often ask for spare change on the streets; bag ladies who often have all their possessions in a shopping cart which accompanies them. They also may include street performers, and people with chronic mental illness.

The term street people is used somewhat loosely and may be used simply to refer to eccentric people who live in Bohemian neighborhoods.

== Code of the Road ==
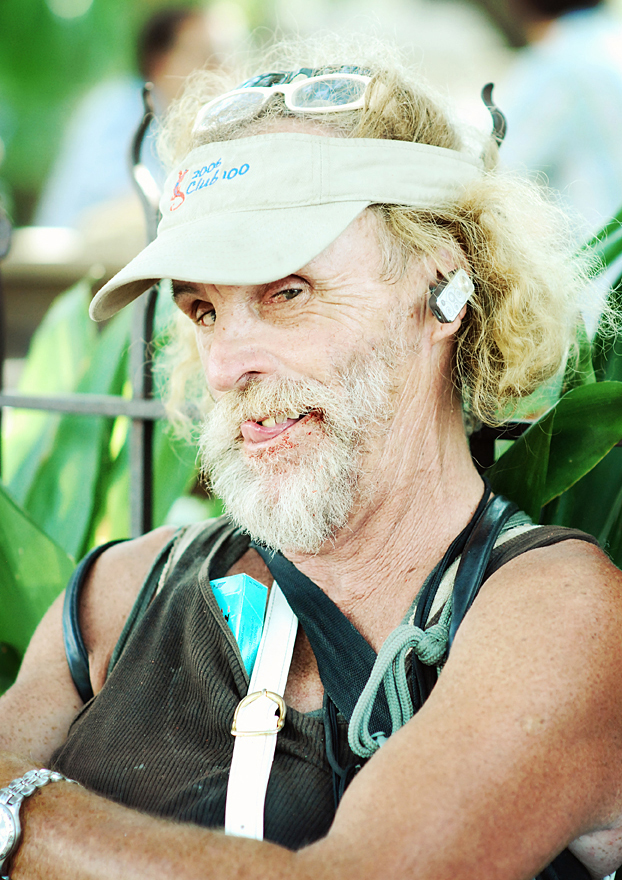
Leslie Cochran on South Congress in Austin, Texas

Street people are said to have an unwritten code or set of rules that govern interaction between street people. Referred to as the "Code of the Road" it emerged from the Hobo camps of the depression era to encompass urban street people. The "Code of the Road" was detailed in Xploited magazine.

== As a social problem ==
Poor economic and social conditions can result in accumulations of the homeless, often called street people, in certain neighborhoods. This may result in revival of vagrancy laws, or similar laws which may prohibit lying or sitting on the street. Results and attitudes vary, especially as liberal communities attempt to grapple with large numbers of the homeless.

== External links and further reading ==
- The Rabble of Downtown Toronto by cartoonist Jason Kieffer, "notable street people in Toronto, himself included".
