= Weightlifting at the 1956 Summer Olympics – Men's 75 kg =

Weightlifter at the Olympics

Men's 75 kg at the Games of the XVI Olympiad
- Venue: Royal Exhibition Building
- Date: 24 November 1956
- Competitors: 16 from 15 nations
- Winning total: 420 kg WR

Medalists
1st place, gold medalist(s)		Fyodor Bogdanovsky	Soviet Union
2nd place, silver medalist(s)		Pete George	United States
3rd place, bronze medalist(s)		Ermanno Pignatti	Italy

The men's 75 kg weightlifting competitions at the 1956 Summer Olympics in Melbourne took place on 24 November at the Royal Exhibition Building. It was the eighth appearance of the middleweight class.

== Competition format ==
Each weightlifter had three attempts at each of the three lifts. The best score for each lift was summed to give a total. The weightlifter could increase the weight between attempts (minimum of 5 kg between first and second attempts, 2.5 kg between second and third attempts) but could not decrease weight. If two or more weightlifters finished with the same total, the competitors' body weights were used as the tie-breaker (lighter athlete wins).

== Records ==
Prior to this competition, the existing world and Olympic records were as follows.

World record	Press	Fyodor Bogdanovsky (URS)	134 kg		1956
World record	Snatch	Yury Duganov (URS)	133 kg		1955
World record	Clean & Jerk	Tommy Kono (USA)	168.5 kg		1953
World record	Total	Fyodor Bogdanovsky (URS)	415 kg		1956
Olympic record	Press	Kim Seong-jip (KOR); Kim Seong-jip (KOR); Gerry Gratton (CAN)	122.5 kg	London, United Kingdom; Helsinki, Finland; Helsinki, Finland	10 August 1948; 26 July 1952; 26 July 1952
Olympic record	Snatch	Pete George (USA)	127.5 kg	Helsinki, Finland	26 July 1952
Olympic record	Clean & Jerk	Pete George (USA)	157.5 kg	Helsinki, Finland	26 July 1952
Olympic record	Total	Pete George (USA)	400 kg	Helsinki, Finland	26 July 1952

== Results ==
Rank	Athlete	Nation	Body weight	Press (kg)				Snatch (kg)				Clean & Jerk (kg)				Total
Rank	Athlete	Nation	Body weight	1	2	3	Result	1	2	3	Result	1	2	3	Result	Total
1st place, gold medalist(s)	Fyodor Bogdanovsky	Soviet Union	74.80	125	130	132.5	132.5 OR	117.5	122.5	~~125~~	122.5	157.5	162.5	165	165 OR	420 WR
2nd place, silver medalist(s)	Pete George	United States	74.40	117.5	~~122.5~~	122.5	122.5	122.5	127.5	~~130~~	127.5 =OR	157.5	162.5	~~170~~	162.5	412.5
3rd place, bronze medalist(s)	Ermanno Pignatti	Italy	74.10	112.5	~~117.5~~	117.5	117.5	112.5	~~117.5~~	117.5	117.5	140	145	147.5	147.5	382.5
4	Jan Bochenek	Poland	74.20	115	115	120	120	107.5	112.5	~~115~~	112.5	142.5	~~147.5~~	150	150	382.5
5	Kim Seong-jip	South Korea	74.30	120	~~125~~	125	125	105	110	~~112.5~~	110	140	145	~~150~~	145	380
6	Krzysztof Beck	Poland	74.50	122.5	~~127.5~~	~~127.5~~	122.5	~~107.5~~	107.5	112.5	112.5	140	145	~~147.5~~	145	380
7	Ibrahim Payrovi	Iran	74.80	102.5	107.5	~~100~~	107.5	112.5	117.5	~~120~~	117.5	142.5	147.5	~~150~~	147.5	372.5
8	Adrien Gilbert	Canada	74.70	105	110	112.5	112.5	105	~~112.5~~	115	115	132.5	137.5	142.5	142.5	370
9	Wong Kay Poh	Singapore	71.60	100	105	107.5	107.5	112.5	~~117.5~~	~~117.5~~	112.5	140	145	~~150~~	145	365
10	Jannie Greeff	South Africa	74.70	~~115~~	115	~~120~~	115	102.5	107.5	~~112.5~~	107.5	~~137.5~~	137.5	142.5	142.5	365
11	Winston McArthur	Guyana	75.00	95	100	~~105~~	100	102.5	107.5	112.5	112.5	130	140	~~142.5~~	140	352.5
12	Ko Bu-beng	Republic of China	72.20	~~90~~	90	~~95~~	90	92.5	~~100~~	100	100	135	~~145~~	~~145~~	135	325
13	Fred Baugh	Australia	74.30	100	~~107.5~~	107.5	107.5	95	~~102.5~~	~~102.5~~	95	~~122.5~~	122.5	--	122.5	325
14	Chan Pak Lum	Malaya	72.20	~~100~~	~~100~~	100	100	~~100~~	100	102.5	102.5	Retired				202.5
15	Carlos Caballero	Colombia	69.80	92.5	97.5	~~100~~	97.5	100	~~105~~	–	100	~~132.5~~	~~132.5~~	~~132.5~~	–	197.5
16	Ingemar Franzén	Sweden	74.00	~~110~~	~~115~~	~~115~~	–	Retired								–

== New records ==
Press	132.5 kg	Fyodor Bogdanovsky (URS)	OR
Snatch	127.5 kg	Pete George (USA)	=OR
Clean & Jerk	165 kg	Fyodor Bogdanovsky (URS)	OR
Total	420 kg	Fyodor Bogdanovsky (URS)	WR
