= Adrien Gilbert =

Canadian weightlifter

Personal information
- Born: 10 September 1931 Canada
- Died: 1 January 2010 (aged 78)

Sport
- Sport: Weightlifting

Adrien Gilbert (10 September 1931 – 1 January 2010) was a Canadian weightlifter. He competed in the men's middleweight event at the 1956 Summer Olympics.
