= Ray Goins =

American musician (1936–2007)

Ray Goins (January 3, 1936 – July 2, 2007) was an American bluegrass banjoist.

Born in Bramwell, West Virginia, Goins aspired to be a lawyer. He changed his career to music in the 1940s after listening to string band music on WCYB radio, and began singing publicly at the age of 16. During a 50-year career he was member of the Lonesome Pine Fiddlers and Ralph Stanley & the Clinch Mountain Boys, before finally forming the Goins Brothers with his older brother, Melvin.

Ray Goins had a heart attack in 1994 and semi-retired from playing professionally in 1997. He still played shows occasionally with Melvin & Windy Mountain after he semi-retired.
