= Jack Cole (businessman) =

American programmer, software publisher

Jack Ridnour Cole
- Born: February 12, 1920; Lincoln, Nebraska, US
- Died: July 29, 2007 (aged 87); Spearfish Canyon, South Dakota, US
- Education: University of Nebraska
- Occupation: Programmer
- Spouse: Lois Keller (m. 1941–1997)

Jack Ridnour Cole (February 12, 1920, in Lincoln, Nebraska – July 29, 2007, in Spearfish Canyon, South Dakota) was an American entrepreneur and businessman who used early computer technology to create "crisscross directories", which are used to sort millions of people by street address. The "Blue Book" is the original criss cross reference directory. These directories "quickly became a staple of public library reference shelves" as well as of valuable use to both business and government, including detectives, direct marketers, police stations, reporters, insurance agents, and small business owners.

Jack Cole earned an undergraduate degree in business from the University of Nebraska and went to work for IBM as a sales representative in Dallas. In 1947 Cole began publishing the Cole Directory, a set of reverse guides to various United States cities which listed a city's residents by address and by telephone number by using IBM's punchcards. He hired typists to keyboard the entire Dallas telephone book onto punch cards. Directories for other cities soon followed, with Cole drawing on census records, tax rolls and other data to supplement the information in the phone book. Cole Directories, which now cover about 200 cities, are published in print and digital forms by the MetroGroup Corporation of Lincoln, Nebraska.

MetroGroup Corporation now owns the fruit of Cole's work, in the form of Cole Information, an information company headquartered in Omaha, Nebraska. The company has adapted to the emerging technologies by advancing from print directories to also specialize in providing marketing programs including internet marketing services, web-based lead and list generation as well as online directories.

A widower, Jack Cole died of cancer, aged 87; he was survived by three children, eight grandchildren, eight great-grandchildren and a sister.
