= Sándor Krebs =

Hungarian sports shooter

Personal information
- Born: 11 October 1926 Nyíregyháza, Hungary
- Died: 16 July 2007 (aged 80)

Sport
- Sport: Sports shooting

Sándor Krebs (11 October 1926 – 16 July 2007) was a Hungarian sports shooter. He competed at the 1956 Summer Olympics and the 1960 Summer Olympics.
