= Fred Baugh =

Australian weightlifter

Personal information
- Full name: Frederick Baugh
- Nationality: Australian
- Born: 7 May 1925
- Died: 19 July 2007 (aged 82)

Sport
- Sport: Weightlifting

Frederick "Fred" Baugh (7 May 1925 – 19 July 2007) was an Australian weightlifter. He competed in the men's middleweight event at the 1956 Summer Olympics.
