= Medha Yodh =

Medha Yodh

Medha Yodh (July 31, 1927 in Ahmedabad – July 11, 2007 in San Diego) was an Indian and Indian American Bharatanatyam dancer and teacher of classical Indian dance at UCLA. She was a disciple of Tanjore Balasaraswati and created a documentary on Garba.

== Early life ==
Medha Yodh was born on July 31, 1927, in the city of Ahmedabad, which is located in the present day state of Gujarat. Yodha began dancing before she turned five years old. Yodh became fascinated with Bharatanatyam, one of India's best known forms of classical dance, early in life.

Despite her interest in dance, Medha Yodh education's was heavily focused on science. Yodha received as Bachelor of Science degree from the University of Bombay. She continued her education and received her master's from Stanford University in California. Medha Yoda later explained her unusual educational background for a dance teacher in a 1984 interview with the Los Angeles Times, "I have a proper Brahman background. I grew up in British India, and I was expected to learn the arts, to go into the sciences and to travel abroad.

Medha Yodh traveled extensively outside of India during her younger years. Her travels exposed her to different forms of modern and world styles of dance. Ultimately, Yodh became a student of Tanjore Balasaraswati, one of the most important Indian dancers of her time, while visiting Connecticut. She became a lifelong student and disciple of Balasaraswati.

She also met and married a Swedish medical student, Carl von Essen, during her travels. The couple later divorced.

== Career ==
Yodh became a faculty member at UCLA in 1976, and focused on teaching Balasaraswati's values and dance styles. She remained at UCLA until her retirement from the school in 1994. She continued to serve as an adviser for a number of UCLA organizations after her retirement, including Dance Kaleidoscope series.

Medha Yodh created an academically well received documentary film in 1987. The film, entitled Garba-Ras: A Glimpse Into Gujarati Culture focused on the Garba, a traditional Gujarati dance.

Yodh continued to dance throughout California following her retirement. A 2000 L.A. Times review on her performance at the "Spirit Dances" series at Highways Performance Space in Santa Monica referred to her as "looking seriously possessed with hearty foot slapping and filigreed fingers."

Medha Yodh continued to teach privately until 2002, when she moved from Oakland to San Diego, California.

Medha Yodh died of failing health on July 11, 2007, at her daughter's, Kamal Muilenburg, home in San Diego. She was 79 years old. She was survived by two daughters, Kamal and Neila von Essen, and two granddaughters. Her son, Eric von Essen, a jazz bassist, died in 1997.
