= Enrico Garbuglia =

- Born: 30 March 1900
- Died: 7 February 2007 (aged 106)
- Military career
- Conflicts: First World War

Enrico di Giuseppe Garbuglia (30 March 1900 – 2 June 2007) was one of the last five remaining known Italian veterans of the First World War living in Italy (two others live in France). Called up to serve in June 1918 near the end of the war, his service was less than six months, and so he was not on the official list of Cavalieri di Vittorio Veneto. It far exceeds, however, the short service times of several American World War I veterans, such as Harold Gardner for example.

Garbuglia was one of the last known World War I veterans to be discovered (along with William Seegers of the U.S., Raymond Cambefort of France, and Yakup Satar of Turkey). His existence was confirmed on 28 May 2007, but he died just five days later.
