= Jack Fearey =

American television pioneer

Jack Fearey (1923 – July 21, 2007) was an American director of the Seattle Center and a television pioneer in the Pacific Northwest. Fearey was best known for establishing two major Seattle civic festivals, the Bumbershoot and the Northwest Folklife Festival.

== Early life ==
Jack Fearey was born in Portland, Oregon in 1923. He attended Whitman College in Walla Walla, Washington, for three years before leaving to serve in the U.S. military during World War II. Following the war, Fearey graduated from the University of Washington in 1947 with a bachelor's degree in music.

Fearey began working at radio stations in Bellingham in the late 1940s before moving to Seattle's KING-TV in the early 1950s. He worked in several positions at KING over the next twenty years, including operations manager, producer and the station's program director. Fearey won a Peabody Award for KING's children's television show "Wunda Wunda" while at the television station.

== Seattle Center ==
Seattle mayor Wes Uhlman appointed Jack Fearey to become director of the Seattle Center in 1970. Fearey had been serving as the president of the Seattle chapter of the Academy of Television Arts and Sciences at the time of his appointment. In 1970, the Seattle Center was a neglected 74-acre (300,000 m^{2}) complex that had served as the site of Seattle's 1962 World's Fair. The Center, which stands at the foot of Queen Anne Hill, was not open year round and was little used by the general public during the late 1960s and early 1970s.

Jack Fearey is widely credited with transforming the Seattle Center into a civic center and Seattle cultural hub during his twelve years as director from 1970 until 1982. Under Fearey's direction, the site for the Seattle Children's Theatre, located at the corner of Second Avenue and Thomas Street, was acquired. He played a major role in the development of the Bagley Wright Theatre, which opened in 1983 after his departure as director of the Seattle Center, as well as the renovation of the Seattle Playhouse, which is now the Intiman Theatre.

The Bumbershoot and the Northwest Folklife Festival each got their start under Jack Fearey's direction. The Bumbershoot, a major Memorial Day arts and music festival, was founded as Festival '71 in 1971 and was renamed to its current name in 1973. The Northwest Folklife Festival, now a major Washington Labor Day event, was also founded during Fearey's tenure as director of the Seattle Center.

Additionally, Fearey oversaw the installation of covered walkways in the Seattle Center to shield pedestrians from Seattle's famous rainy weather. He also worked to bring the "Treasure of Tutankhamen" tour to Seattle, which exhibited for 4 months in 1978 at the center's Flag Plaza Pavilion.

Jack Fearey resigned in 1982 after members of the Seattle city council blamed him for financial mismanagement. The Seattle Center was over one million dollars in debt at the time.

== Post Seattle Center ==
Jack Fearey continued to stay active the television, business and arts industries following his departure from the Seattle Center. He served on the board of directors of the Academy of Television Arts & Sciences. Fearey was also the former president of the International Association of Auditorium Managers. Fearey worked during his later years as a consultant for The Fearey Group, a Seattle based public relations agency owned by his wife, Pat Fearey.

Jack Fearey died on July 21, 2007, after battling Alzheimer's disease. He was survived by his wife, Pat (Fearey's first wife died in 1975.), and two sons from his first marriage.
