= William Seegers =

American centenarian and veteran (1900–2007)

William Alfred Seegers (October 24, 1900 – July 10, 2007) was, at age 106, one of the last two known remaining veterans of the First World War to have served in the German forces (the other one is Erich Kästner) and California's last known World War I veteran. He had a son named Forrest Stewart (adopted name) of Clay Center, Kansas.

== World War I ==
Born Wilhelm Alfred Seegers near Brinkum, he was originally passed over for service in October 1917 as being too short, only five foot three inches. But by the middle of 1918, the Germans were desperate for recruits, and he was drafted on June 10, 1918. Seegers served in the 71st Infantry Regiment. Since he didn't want to shoot anyone, and in part due to his short stature, he volunteered for office work and was accepted as such, though soon he was made to perform guard duty as well. In the closing months, with food in short supply and desertions rampant, Seegers deserted (in part because he didn't like his commander) and joined a second division in the confusion and collapse of the German Empire in November 1918. William did not serve in combat but guarded POWs. While serving in this capacity, he, like many of his comrades and prisoners, contracted the Spanish flu, killing many, but Seegers managed to survive. As his tasks included administrative duties, he stayed on after the Armistice. He was discharged from service in April 1919.

== Post war ==
In 1922, Seegers emigrated to the U.S. by way of New York Harbor. He settled in Pennsylvania, and became a United States citizen. In October 2006, when he turned 106, William moved to California to live with his daughter, having lived independently until that point. Perhaps because he served for Germany, no one noticed his status as a World War I veteran until his family contacted the Gerontology Research Group in May 2007. He told of problems such as food shortages and low morale among the German soldiers. He was one of the last four World War I veterans to be discovered so far, the others being Yakup Satar of Turkey, Raymond Cambefort of France and Enrico Garbuglia of Italy (who died not long after having been discovered). Interviewed in May 2007 by GRG correspondent Robert Young, William was photographed in June 2007 by former presidential photographer David DeJonge as part of a "surviving World War I veterans" project. He died the following month, three months before what would have been his 107th birthday.
