= William S. Finucane =

American politician and businessman

William Sidney Finucane (August 3, 1888 – October 26, 1951) was an American politician and businessman.

Finucane was born in Chicago, Illinois. He went to the Chicago parochial and public schools. Finucane served in the United States Navy during World War I. Married to Eleanor Gaynor Finucane, they had two children, Thomas J Finucane (1923-1994) and Margaret Ellen Finucane (1928-2013). He operated a bowling alley and owned Finucane's Corner, a tavern at Archer Ave & Loomis St., in the Bridgeport neighborhood of Chicago. Finucane was involved with the Republican Party. Finucane served in the Illinois House of Representatives from 1939 until his death in 1951. Finucane died at his home in Chicago, Illinois. His son, Thomas J. married Gertrude McNichols, also of the Bridgeport neighborhood. They had six children: William S. “Bill” II, Thomas J, Jr, Margaret Ellen, Mary Ann, Patrick Michael, and James Daniel.
