= John Rubey =

American television executive (1951–2025)

- Born: October 5, 1951; Evergreen Park, Illinois, U.S.
- Died: September 17, 2025 (aged 73); Aurora, Colorado, U.S.
- Occupations: CEO and executive producer for Rubey Entertainment, previously inaugural CEO of Fathom Events, president of AEG-TV and Network Live

John Rubey (October 5, 1951 – September 17, 2025) was an American television executive, CEO and executive producer for Rubey Entertainment. He served as Fathom Events' first chief executive officer, leading the company to substantial revenue and event attendance growth. Prior to Fathom, Rubey was president of AEG-TV and Network LIVE where he produced many events for Fathom and others.

== Early life ==
Rubey was born on October 5, 1951, in Evergreen Park, Illinois, to Charles and Catherine Whalen-Rubey. His father was a senior sales executive for Schwartz Paper Company, while his mother tended to John and his seven siblings.

== Education ==
He held a B.S. in accounting and economics from Regis University. Eighteen years after graduating, Rubey returned to school at the University of Houston to obtain an MBA. Rubey was certified by the state of Colorado as a certified public accountant. While at Regis University, Rubey ran the activities board and oversaw the coordination of concerts, films, dances and other student activities.

== Career ==
John Rubey was the CEO and executive producer for Rubey Entertainment where he was responsible for the overall vision, entertainment marketing, digital content development and execution of the company's strategic initiatives. Previously, Rubey was Fathom Events' first CEO, bringing to the alternative content cinema leader more than 25 years of digital content and entertainment marketing experience.

Prior to Fathom Events, he oversaw the filming and distribution of all AEG-TV and AEG Network LIVE's events from music festivals to leading content distributors including: VEVO, YouTube, HULU, Yahoo!, MySpace and others, in addition to festival and artist sites, mobile phones and high-definition TV. He was also directly responsible for capturing the industry's top music festivals and concert performance in digital 3D for cinema distribution worldwide.

In addition to being the president of AEG Network LIVE, Rubey founded and owned Spring Communications, a leader in pay-per-view concerts and events, and held the position of COO of PACE Management (now LIVE Nation), for over six years prior to Spring Communications.

Professional organizations:

- Television Academy
- Producer's Guild
- Telly Awards Silver Council
- International 3D Society

== Personal life and death ==
Rubey and his wife resided in Los Angeles with their four children. Rubey was involved with church and community activities and was honored with the Arts & Life Achievement Award by Arts & Living Magazine in 2012.

Rubey died in Aurora, Colorado on September 17, 2025, at the age of 73.

== Awards ==
John Rubey received various awards and honors for his involvement in the entertainment industry.

- 60 Telly Awards – (2D and 3D)
- 4 Mobile Excellence Awards
- 2 Lumiere Awards from the International 3D Society
- 2 Hollywood 3D Film Festival Awards
- 2 Cine Golden Eagle Awards
- 1 EPix Performing Arts Special
