= Mirsha Serrano =

Mexican footballer (1979-2007)

Personal information
- Full name: Mirsha Serrano Pérez
- Date of birth: May 2, 1979
- Place of birth: Acapulco, Guerrero, Mexico
- Date of death: July 23, 2007 (aged 28)
- Place of death: Lázaro Cárdenas, Michoacán, Mexico
- Height: 1.73 m (5 ft 8 in)
- Position: Midfielder

Senior career*
Years	Team	Apps	(Gls)
2000–2005	Tecos UAG	112	(5)
2006	Atlante	21	(0)
2007	Tecos UAG	6	(0)
Total		139	(5)
- * Club domestic league appearances and goals

Mirsha Serrano Pérez (May 2, 1979 – July 23, 2007) was a Mexican football player with Tecos UAG. He died in a car accident on July 23, 2007.

== Club career ==
Born in Acapulco, Serrano made 139 Primera División appearances, scoring five goals, during a 15-season career. He played thirteen seasons with Tecos UAG and two with Atlante. Serrano made his debut in the Primera División de México with Tecos UAG on February 20, 2000.
