= Fathom Entertainment =

American entertainment content provider

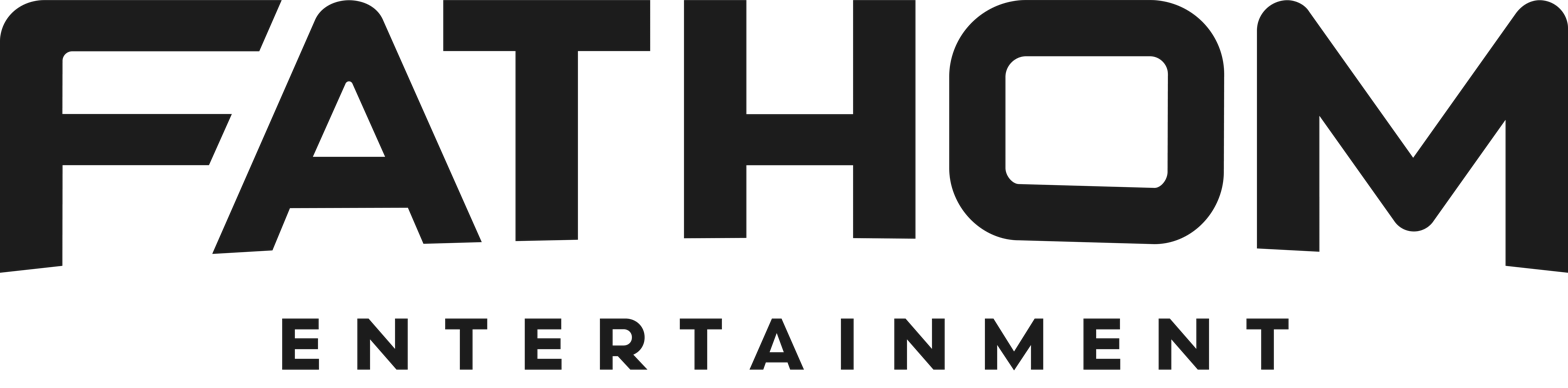
- Logo used since 2024
- Industry: Speciality distributor
- Founded: 2005; 21 years ago
- Headquarters: Greenwood Village, Colorado, United States
- Key people: Ray Nutt (CEO)
- Owner: AC JV, LLC
- Parent: AMC Entertainment Holdings, Inc.; Regal Cinemas; Cinemark Holdings, Inc.
- Website: www.fathomentertainment.com

Fathom Entertainment is an entertainment content provider that broadcasts entertainment events in movie theaters throughout the United States, including Metropolitan Opera Live in HD, the performing arts, major sporting events, and music concerts.

== History ==
The company was spun out of National CineMedia in 2013 to focus on live performances that National CineMedia had started presenting; the parent company remained focused on producing advertising for movie theaters, which had been its original business. Fathom Events is owned by AC JV, LLC, a joint venture of AMC Theatres, Regal Cinemas, and Cinemark Theatres, the three largest theater chains in the United States.

John Rubey was the first CEO of Fathom Events, having previously served as president of AEG-TV and Network LIVE.

In 2014, The Theatre Museum Awards honored Fathom Events with the Awards for Excellence in Theatre History Preservation.

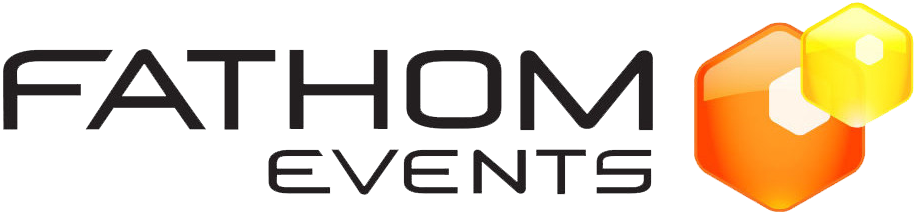
Logo used from 2013 to 2024

In 2015, Fathom Events was named "Best Distributor in the Americas" and received eight box office awards by the Event Cinema Association (ECA).

Ray Nutt became CEO of Fathom Events in 2017, having previously served as senior vice president of business relations for Regal Entertainment Group, where he sat on the board of directors for Fathom. Before that, he grew business for Regal CineMedia and United Artists Theatres.

In November 2023, The Blind became the company's top-grossing movie, taking over $15.7 million at North American box offices. The film was later surpassed by the release of The Chosen Last Supper: Part 1 in April 2025, which grossed about $20.2 million at North American box offices.

In January 2025, the company rebranded to Fathom Entertainment.
