= Murder of Russel Timoshenko =

2007 murder of a New York City police officer

Russel Timoshenko
- Born: August 18, 1983; Bobruysk, Byelorussian SSR, Soviet Union
- Died: July 14, 2007 (aged 23); Kings County Hospital, Brooklyn; New York City, New York, U.S.
- Resting place: Moravian Cemetery, Staten Island; New York City, New York, U.S.
- Police career
- Country: United States
- Allegiance: City of New York
- Department: New York City Police Department
- Service years: 2006–2007
- Rank: Sworn in as an Officer: 1/2006; Promoted to Detective: 7/2007 †
- Badge no.: 25169
- Awards: – NYPD Medal of Honor †; Brady Law Enforcement Award † † posthumously

Russel Timoshenko (August 18, 1983 – July 14, 2007) was a 23-year-old New York Police Department (NYPD) police officer who was shot on July 9, 2007, and died five days later, after pulling over a stolen BMW automobile in New York City's Crown Heights, Brooklyn, neighborhood. After a four-day manhunt that stretched across three states, all three suspects Dexter Bostic, Robert Ellis and Lee Woods were eventually apprehended and convicted—two of murder, and the third for weapons possession. At his widely attended funeral, Timoshenko was posthumously promoted to the rank of Detective. The case garnered national media attention because the weapons used were all illegally obtained handguns. This sparked widespread debate over gun control laws in New York City, and over the process by which firearms are traced by police departments.

== Murder ==
Timoshenko and his partner, Officer Herman Yan, had been driving in a marked 71st precinct police car on patrol in Crown Heights, with Timoshenko riding as the passenger, when they spotted a 2003 black BMW sport utility vehicle headed westbound on Lefferts Avenue at 2:30 am. The officers scanned the BMW's license plate on a computer in their police car. When the check came back, it indicated that the plate was assigned to a 2007 Mitsubishi Outlander, not the BMW. Timoshenko and Yan signaled for the vehicle to pull over. The driver complied, turning north onto Rogers Avenue, where both officers got out of their car and approached the stopped vehicle.

Dexter Bostic

Robert Ellis

Lee Woods

Before the officers arrived at the front of the car, Dexter Bostic, 34, opened fire from the passenger's seat with a .45 caliber handgun, striking Timoshenko once in the face and once in the throat. Yan had been approaching on the driver's side, while Timoshenko was coming up from the passenger's side. From the back seat of the BMW, Robert Ellis, 34, shot Yan with a 9mm handgun, striking him in the arm and chest; Yan was saved by his ballistic vest and was able to return fire. A third suspect, 29-year-old Lee Woods, was driving the BMW at the time of the shooting. After firing at least seven rounds at the officers, the three suspects fled the scene. Police later found the abandoned car on Kingston Avenue, about four blocks from where the shooting occurred.

Timoshenko was rushed to Kings County Hospital Center once medical personnel arrived at the scene. Each of the two bullets that struck Timoshenko cut across his spinal cord, just beneath his brain, which left him unable to breathe on his own or to move his muscles. According to doctors, he had no oxygen for 15 to 20 minutes after he was shot because of his initial paralysis. The loss of oxygen left him in a coma since the shooting, so he was placed on life support machines that allowed him to breathe. Tests conducted on July 14 determined that he had no brain activity (matching the definition of legal death in the state of New York); as a result, the doctors pronounced him dead at 4:14 pm and turned off the artificial respirator. He was 23 years old at the time of his death.

=== Motive ===
Media reports stated that the men committed the crime in an effort to avoid returning to prison, as all three had violent criminal records. Bostic previously served nine years in state prison for assault, robbery, and sodomy in 1990. He was sent to prison again in 2001 to serve three years for armed robbery (in which an accomplice fired shots), resulting in his second felony. In 1992, at the age of 19, Ellis was convicted of first-degree rape and sodomy. Woods was sent to prison in 1997, also at age 19, for illegal weapons possession and assaulting a police officer during his arrest.

If the police identified Bostic even before the shooting occurred, he would have faced a two-year prison sentence for violating the terms of his parole, since he was out past his curfew. After the shooting, police discovered the BMW had been stolen from the Five Towns Mitsubishi car dealership in Inwood, Long Island, where Bostic worked as a salesman. A motor vehicle theft or gun possession conviction would have been Bostic's third felony, likely resulting in a lengthy prison sentence.

== Aftermath ==
=== Manhunt ===
Police apprehended Lee Woods at the home of his girlfriend, Nicole Bostic (Dexter Bostic’s sister), in Far Rockaway, Queens, New York, on July 10. He identified Bostic and Ellis as his accomplices, and told police that while he knew his friends had guns, he was unaware they were going to open fire on the officers. City detectives were tipped to the whereabouts of Bostic and Ellis on the afternoon of July 11, after being contacted by a man who, unaware of the suspects' fugitive status, assisted the suspects in their escape by driving them across Long Island, from Far Rockaway to Port Jefferson, New York, before riding a ferry across Long Island Sound to Bridgeport, Connecticut. They then drove west, stopping at a supermarket in Tarrytown, New York, where they purchased food and water, before continuing on to Pennsylvania, according to New York City Police Commissioner Raymond Kelly. Remnants of the same food the men purchased were found in a Pennsylvania forest, where investigators had eventually tracked the suspects.

Hundreds of NYPD officers, U.S. marshals, and Pennsylvania State Troopers were involved in the manhunt, using helicopters and four police dogs to assist with the search. By July 11, 2007, the bounty for information leading to the whereabouts of Bostic and Ellis reached $64,000, with the Patrolmen's Benevolent Association proposing an additional $25,000. The driver initially dropped off Bostic and Ellis about 14 miles from where Bostic was finally arrested in Pocono Township, Pennsylvania.

On July 11, a passing motorist spotted the fugitives by Interstate 80 and called police. The men fled when authorities arrived at the scene shortly after, but Bostic was tackled by a state trooper shortly after 6 p.m., while Ellis managed to escape. At 8 a.m. the next morning, Ellis was cornered near I-80 by two police dogs. (Note: The two dogs, Scooby, a 5-year-old male bloodhound (designated Bloodhound No. 2) handled by Officer Lawrence Zacarese, and Axle, a 2 ½ -year-old German Shepherd (designated Bloodhound No. 2) handled by Officer Joseph Giordano, played a critical role in the search and were responsible for tracing the scent to Ellis.) Both men were extradited to New York from Pennsylvania on July 12. Police brought Timoshenko's handcuffs and used them to apprehend Ellis during his arrest. Police did not release the name of the driver who assisted the suspects.

=== Mourning ===
Over 30,000 people attended Timoshenko's funeral in Flatlands, Brooklyn, where Mayor Michael Bloomberg delivered the eulogy, praising Timoshenko, stating, "By stopping that car, he and Officer Yan helped us capture three career criminals whose appetite for evil knew no bounds—saving who knows how many future victims, people who will never know how lucky they are." In Washington, DC at the National Law Enforcement Officers Memorial, Timoshenko's name is engraved under Panel 16-West, Line 26.

=== Awards and recognition ===
Timoshenko had served with the NYPD for 18 months. In a ceremony held on July 27, 2007, Timoshenko was posthumously promoted to the rank of Detective First Grade and his partner, Herman Yan, was promoted to Detective. Mayor Bloomberg called the promotion, "A small measure of our appreciation for the supreme sacrifice that Russel made, and to honor his life."

On June 16, 2008, Mayor Bloomberg and NYPD Commissioner Kelly bestowed the New York City Police Department Medal of Honor on Timoshenko and Yan. The award is the highest law enforcement medal given by the NYPD, which was awarded posthumously to Timoshenko and accepted by his parents in a ceremony held at the NYPD headquarters in New York. New York Governor David Paterson named the two officers Police Officers of the Year in New York State on July 24, 2009. (Note: Seventeen officers from eleven law enforcement agencies were nominated statewide for the 2007 award.) The award, first given in 1983, recognizes a single police officer or team for "an exceptional act of valor symbolizing the service of police in New York State."

On October 6, 2009, Timoshenko's parents accepted the James S. Brady Law Enforcement Award (named after the former assistant to President Ronald Reagan), given to their son posthumously in recognition of his commitment to public safety through his outstanding law enforcement career. The award was presented by NYPD Commissioner Kelly.

In November 2009, a local street, Durant Avenue, was renamed to Detective Russel Timoshenko Way in the detective's honor. Incidentally, following the controversial decision to rename a street to Sean Bell Way for police shooting victim Sean Bell, some community members had recommended doing the same for Timoshenko. However, the latter case had attracted much less media attention.

== Trial ==
All three suspects were arraigned and charged with aggravated first degree murder for the killing of Timoshenko, and other charges related to the wounding of Yan, including attempted murder and aggravated assault on a police officer. They faced life in prison if convicted of the first degree murder charges. The city's police union and other parties asked federal prosecutors to take over the case so that the three suspects could face the death penalty, but the case was tried by the Brooklyn district attorney on November 10, 2008, after federal officials refused to prosecute the case. Although the three defendants were being prosecuted simultaneously, there was a rare separate jury assigned to each of them.

On December 17, 2008, Robert Ellis was found not guilty on the charges of aggravated murder and attempted aggravated murder, but was found guilty on three charges of gun possession. On January 14, 2009, a judge sentenced Ellis to 15 years in prison on the gun possession charges. On December 19, 2008, Dexter Bostic was found guilty of aggravated murder, attempted aggravated murder, and three charges of gun possession; he was sentenced to life in prison without the possibility of parole.

Lee Woods was tried twice, after his first trial ended in a mistrial due to a juror in her 20s falling ill. Wood's attorney, Samuel J. Karlin, told the judge his client wanted to continue with the ill juror, instead of using an alternate. At his second trial on March 16, 2009, Lee Woods was found guilty of aggravated murder, attempted aggravated murder, and 3 charges of gun possession. He was also sentenced to life in prison without the possibility of parole.

Prosecutors believed Nicole Bostic, 26 at the time, aided Lee Woods in hiding the guns found in the BMW that Timoshenko and Yan pulled over, dumping them in a nearby garage before police retrieved them; Bostic, however, only admitted to giving Woods a ride. She pled guilty to helping the three men escape, and originally faced seven years in prison for her role. She later accepted a plea bargain, pleading guilty to a misdemeanor count of hindering the prosecution in exchange for three years probation, thereby avoiding jail.

== Gun legislation ==
Reports indicated that the gun dealer involved had previously been indicted for illegal gun sales, and that all the weapons found in the BMW were illegally obtained. The gun shop in question no longer exists, and the dealer is no longer licensed to sell firearms. Because the gun was used by a person with a criminal history, and because the NYPD was denied requests to look up the seller of the gun, legislators sought to make it easier for law enforcement to investigate.

=== Senate hearings ===
In September 2007, Senator Charles Schumer questioned Michael J. Sullivan, nominated to be the director of the Bureau of Alcohol, Tobacco, Firearms and Explosives (ATF), at a Senate Judiciary Committee hearing investigating why the NYPD's request for information on who had sold the gun had been denied. The NYPD asked the ATF for data about which dealers in Virginia supplied the most crime gunsin order to identify the traffickers. The ATF refused that request for data, citing the Tiahrt Amendment, which restricts cities' access to and use of ATF trace data). The New York Daily News ran a headline editorial in support for repealing the amendment, entitled "Congress Owes This Hero."

At the Senate hearing in Washington D.C., Schumer stated, "If this is true, it is an outrage. If it is true, it is a horrible example of gun laws gone wrong." Sullivan, then acting director of the ATF, replied to the criticism, stating, "I'm not sure why the request was turned down", and pledged to look into the matter and provide further clarification in writing.

=== New gun laws for New York City ===
The complications regarding the illegal firearms used in Timoshenko's murder inspired new laws passed in New York City, which authorized new penalties, touted as "part of the toughest illegal gun possession law in the country." A public awareness campaign, named "GUNS=PRISON", featured posters calling attention to the 3 ½ year prison sentence given to anyone caught carrying an illegal loaded handgun in New York. At a press conference, Mayor Bloomberg stated, "Police Officer Russell Timoshenko was just the latest victim killed by a gunman firing at close range. If the prospect of three and a half years in jail deters just one would-be killer from carrying a gun and taking the life of another police officer in another deadly confrontation, then the law and the efforts to publicize it are well worth it." NFL player Plaxico Burress was charged with this new law due to an incident that occurred inside of a New York City nightclub. On August 20, 2009, Burress pleaded guilty to a gun possession charge and agreed to a two-year prison sentence.

== See also ==
- Newhall massacre (or Newhall Incident) (April 6, 1970): a similar incident of a deadly traffic stop wherein four police officers were killed by two armed felons.
