= Mr. Butch =

American street icon (1951–2007)

Mr. Butch - Allston, Ma. c. 1983

Harold Madison Jr., (September 11, 1951 – July 12, 2007), more widely known as Mr. Butch, and sometimes called the "King of Kenmore Square" and "The Mayor of Allston" was a homeless man living on the streets of Boston. Over the course of three decades, he gained significant celebrity among Boston's college students and within its rock scene.

== Biography ==
Madison was born in Worcester, Massachusetts. He spent the early 1970s as a fixture on the Worcester common and Main South, and making music on Castle Street, Elm Park and Highland Street in Worcester. Early in his life, Mr. Butch showed a distinct talent in making people smile, especially through music. In the mid-to-late-1970s, after completing his studies at Berklee College of Music, Mr. Butch was often seen on the streets near that school, playing a Fender Stratocaster guitar, with an open tuning that allowed him to play chords with a single finger. His dreadlock hairstyle and choice of guitar invited comparisons with Jimi Hendrix.

He got his name from a T-shirt that Billy Cole of The Real Kids gave him that said "Mr. Butch" on it.

During the 1980s, Mr. Butch's fame among the local music scene grew, and he was given gigs at The Underground in Allston and The Rat in Kenmore Square, as well as Channel club on Boston's waterfront (all now defunct). Besides solo gigs, he would also sometimes perform with his band of rotating musicians and derelicts, Mr. Butch and the Holy Men. It was around this time that he began to be featured in The Noise, a local music fanzine, and was featured in many of their advertisements. Mr. Butch is mentioned in the liner notes to local hardcore punk compilation Bands That Could Be God, which featured, among others, Deep Wound (pre-Dinosaur Jr.), as the man to whom the compilation would be dedicated had he been on God's other side. Mr. Butch is also featured in the art work for the CD compilation I've Got My Friends. It features a combination of Boston and San Francisco punk bands, including The Unseen, Dropkick Murphys, The Outlets, The Ducky Boys, Swingin' Utters, The Working Stiffs, and Showcase Showdown.

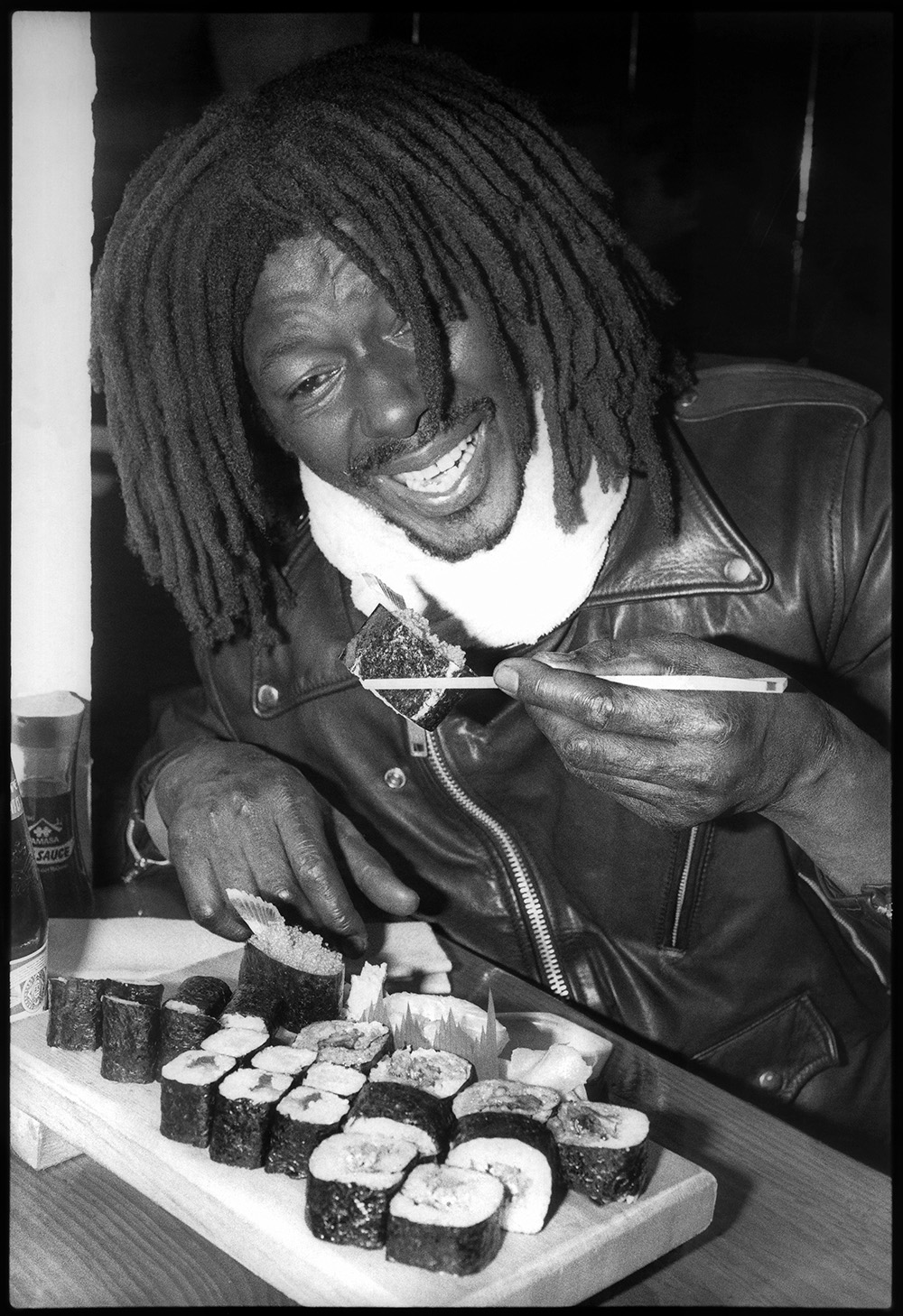
Mr. Butch enjoying sushi, celebrating the end of a profitable day's work with Japanese cuisine near Kenmore Square, Boston, Massachusetts. —photo by David Henry

In the late 1990s, the Boston University campus police, extending their authority over an increasingly gentrified Kenmore Square, exiled Mr. Butch to Allston, a neighborhood of Boston west of the Square. Mr. Butch sought refuge from the elements wherever he could by sleeping in U-Hauls, the homes of his many friends, a practice space where friends' punk bands played, and occasionally in ATM lobbies. He had low income apartments from time to time, but he never enjoyed the trappings of it, such as he “didn't want to buy trash bags”. Many people do not know he actively chose and enjoyed his lifestyle. He often played his guitar and penny whistle, peppering his dialogue with the phrase “in a kind way”. Many saw Butch as a sage, or a prophet, and he was known to commune on the sidewalks with college students, other homeless people, and those seeking his advice and friendship; Butch was kind-spirited and not known to be an "aggressive panhandler", choosing instead to have a smiling Rastafarian demeanor.

An Allston merchant helped him collect his Social Security payments and secured a broken down van in a parking lot off Harvard Avenue, near Glenville Avenue, where he slept. Occasionally, on really cold nights, he would sleep in the store. Mr. Butch had several “banks” around Allston, places that kept his money for him. He would go in those stores and make deposits and withdrawals to buy things as he needed. He eventually saved enough of his own money to buy himself a new Vespa scooter.

Mr. Butch's likeness appeared in a mural on the side of a building located on the corner of Cambridge Street and Harvard Avenue in Allston, until the city painted over it.

== Death ==
Mr. Butch was traveling inbound on Brighton Avenue on his scooter around 8 AM on July 12, 2007, at a speed close to 50 miles per hour (80 km/h) when he struck a light pole across from the fire station. He was taken to Brigham and Women's Hospital, where he was pronounced dead. He was 56.

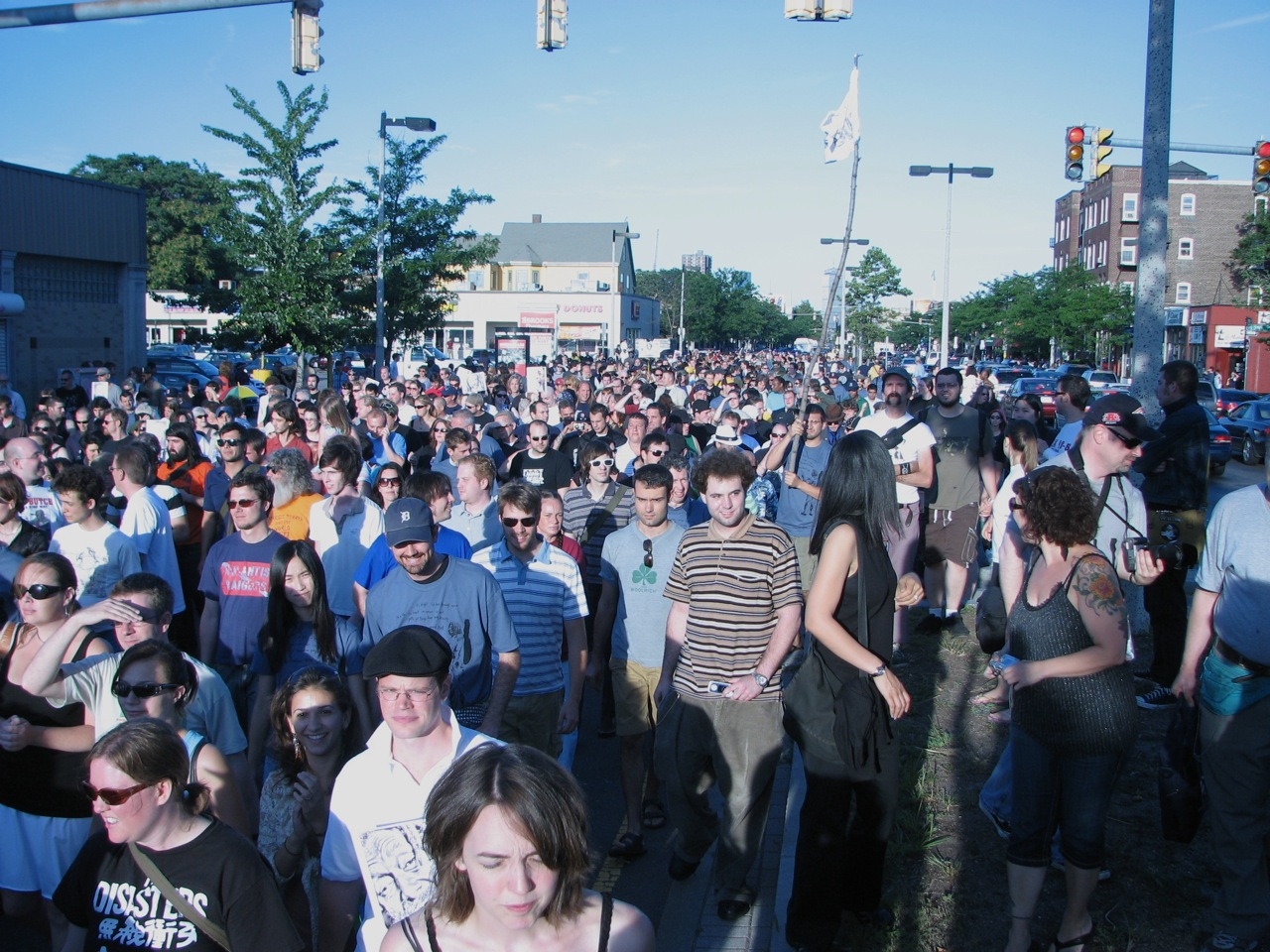
Large crowd filling the street of Brighton Ave in Allston, MA, for Mr. Butch's memorial

A memorial was held Sunday July 22, 2007, where a crowd of about 1,000 people gathered in the streets of Allston to honor him. Streets were closed off as the procession, led by the Second Line Social Aid and Pleasure Society Brass Band traveled down Brighton and Harvard Ave before filing into the International Community Church for a memorial service. Some members of his family were in attendance and his ashes were distributed to them.

== See also ==
- Street people
- Panhandler
- Settlement movement
- Work ethic
- Homelessness
- Warming center
- Saint Francis House (Boston)
