= Ermanno Pignatti =

Italian weightlifter (1921–1995)

- Pignatti (right) at the 1956 Olympics

Personal information
- Born: 8 August 1921 Modena, Italy
- Died: 30 October 1995 (aged 74)

Sport
- Sport: Weightlifting
- Club: Fiamme d'Oro, Milan
Medal record
Representing Italy
Olympic Games
Bronze medal – third place	1956 Melbourne	Middleweight
European Weightlifting Championships
Bronze medal – third place	1950 Paris	Lightweight
Gold medal – first place	1951 Milan	Lightweight
Bronze medal – third place	1953 Stockholm	Middleweight
Silver medal – second place	1954 Vienna	Middleweight
Bronze medal – third place	1958 Stockholm	Middleweight

Ermanno Pignatti (8 August 1921 – 30 October 1995) was an Italian weightlifter. He competed at the 1952 and 1956 Summer Olympics and finished in ninth and third place, respectively. He won five medals at the European Championships in 1950–1958.
