= List of closed Catholic seminaries in the United States =

The following is a list of Catholic seminaries which have closed in the United States.

== Arizona ==
- Regina Cleri Minor Seminary (Tucson) - Operated from 1956 to 1974; run by the Congregation of the Mission.

== Arkansas ==
- St. John Home Mission Seminary (Little Rock) - Operated from 1930 to 1967; run by the Diocese of Little Rock.

== California ==
- Our Lady Queen of Angels Seminary (Los Angeles) - Operated from 1926 to 1994; run by the archdiocese.
- St. Anthony Seraphic College (Santa Barbara) - Opened in 1901; run by the Franciscan Friars.

== Colorado ==
- St. Thomas Seminary (Denver) - Operated from 1907 to 1995; run by the Congregation of the Mission. Saint John Vianney Theological Seminary was constituted on March 17, 1999, to replace the former Saint Thomas Seminary that had been operating at the site.

== Connecticut ==
- St. Thomas Seminary (Hartford) - Operated from 1898 to 1990's; run by the Archdiocese of Hartford.

== District of Columbia ==
- St. Joseph's Seminary - major seminary run by the Josephites, founded in 1888; later an independent academic seminary, but residential-only beginning in the early 1970s
- Epiphany Apostolic College - former minor seminary run by the Josephites; founded in Baltimore in 1889 and later moved near Newburgh in 1925; eventually closed for seminary studies in 1970, and operated as a Catholic high school until 1975.

== Hawaii ==
- St. Stephen Minor Seminary (Honolulu) - Operated from 1948 to 1976; run by the Diocese of Honolulu.

== Illinois ==
- Archbishop Quigley Preparatory Seminary (Chicago) - Operated from 1918 to 2007; run by the archdiocese.
- Archbishop Quigley Preparatory Seminary North (Chicago) - Operated from 1918 to 1990; run by the archdiocese.
- Archbishop Quigley Preparatory Seminary South (Chicago) - Operated from 1961 to 1990; run by the archdiocese.
- Cathedral College of the Sacred Heart (Chicago) - Operated from 1905 to 1918; run by the archdiocese.
- Mater Dolorosa Preparatory Seminary (Chicago) - Operated from 1919 to 1927; run by the Servites.
- Mater Dolorosa Preparatory Seminary (Hillside) - Operated from 1927 to 1945; run by the Servites.
- Our Lady of the Angels Major Seminary (Quincy) - Operated from 1964 to 1987; run by the Franciscan Friars.
- Saint Joseph College Seminary (Chicago) - Operated from 1994 to May 2019; run by the archdiocese
- St. Joseph Seraphic College (Teutopolis) - Operated from 1898 to 1967; run by the Franciscan Friars.
- St. Joseph Seraphic College (Westmont) - Operated from 1927 to 1978; run by the Franciscan Friars.
- Tolentine College (Olympia Fields) - Operated from 1958 to 1974; run by the Augustinian Friars.
- St. Henry's Prep (Belleville) - Closed around 1990; run by the Oblates of Mary Immaculate.
- St. Charles Borromeo Seminary High School (Romeoville, Illinois, Diocese of Joliet) - Operated from 1965 to 1980; run by the diocese.

== Indiana ==
- Our Lady of the Lake Seminary (Syracuse) – Opened in 1948; run by the Diocese of Fort Wayne-South Bend.
- Sacred Heart Seminary (Fort Wayne) – Operated from 1939 to 1948; run by the Crosier Fathers.
- Divine Heart Seminary (Donaldson) – Operated by Sacred Heart Fathers (SCJs) of Hales Corners, WI, from 1930 to 1973 [Diocese of Fort Wayne-South Bend]

== Kentucky ==
- St. Pius X Seminary (Erlanger) - Operated from 1955 to 1987; run by the Diocese of Covington.
- St. Thomas Minor Seminary (Louisville) - Operated from 1952 to 1970; run by the Archdiocese of Louisville.

== Louisiana ==
- Assumption Seminary (New Orleans) (New Orleans) - Operated from 1839 to 1867; run by the Archdiocese of New Orleans.
- St. Mary of Consolation Seminary (New Orleans) - Operated from 1870 to 1881; run by the Archdiocese of New Orleans.

== Maryland ==
- St. Charles Seminary (Catonsville) - Operated from 1848 to 1977; operated by the Archdiocese of Baltimore.
- Saint Mary's College (Ilchester) - Operated from 1868 to 1972; operated by the Redemptorists.
- Divine Savior Seminary, Lanham, Maryland operated from 1935 to 1969, operated by the Society of the Salvatorians, Wisconsin

== Massachusetts ==
- Carmelite Junior Seminary (Hamilton) - Operated by the Carmelite friars from 1945 to 1969.
- St. Francis Seraphic Seminary (River Road, Andover) - Operated by the Order of Friars Minor (Brown Franciscans) of the Province of the Immaculate Conception from 1930 to 1977. It was then operated as the Franciscan Retreat and Conference Center. It was demolished in 2016.
- Queen of Apostles Seminary – operated by the Society of African Missions from 1946 to the late 1960s.

== Michigan ==
- St. Augustine Seminary (Holland) - Operated from 1949 to 1977; run by the Augustinian Friars.
- St. John's Provincial Seminary (Plymouth) - Operated from 1949 to 1988; run by the Archdiocese of Detroit.

== Minnesota ==
- Crosier Seminary (Onamia) - Closed in 1989; run by the Crosier Fathers.
- Nazareth Hall Preparatory Seminary - closed in 1971 and replaced by St. John Vianney College Seminary; run by the Archdiocese of Saint Paul and Minneapolis. Campus now used by University of Northwestern – St. Paul

== Mississippi ==
- St. Augustine Seminary (Bay St. Louis) - Run by the Society of the Divine Word and opened in the 1920s to educate African Americans for the priesthood. Closed in 1967.

== Missouri ==
- Precious Blood Minor Seminary (Liberty) - Operated from 1963 to 1983; run by the Missionaries of the Precious Blood.
- St. Louis Preparatory Seminary North (Florissant) - Operated from 1965 to 1987.
- St. Louis Preparatory Seminary South (Shrewsbury) - Operated from 1931 to 1991.
- St. Mary of the Barrens Seminary (Perryville) - Operated from 1818 to 1858; run by the Congregation of the Mission.
- St. Regis Seminary (Florissant) - Operated from 1824 to 1831; run by the Society of Jesus.
- St. Stanislaus Seminary (Florissant) - Operated from 1831 to 1971; run by the Society of Jesus.
- St. Thomas Aquinas Preparatory Seminary (Hannibal) - Operated from 1957 to 2002; run by the Diocese of Jefferson City.
- St. Vincent's Seminary (Missouri) (Perryville) - Operated until 1979.

== Montana ==
- Northwestern Theological Seminary (Billings) - Operated from 1956 to 2014.

== New Jersey ==
- Divine Word Seminary (Bordentown) - Operated from 1947 to 1983; run by the Society of the Divine Word.
- St. Joseph Preparatory Seminary (Princeton) - Closed in 1992; operated by the Congregation of the Mission.

° Mother of the Savior Seminary, Blackwood, New Jersey, 1947–1967. Junior seminary operated by the Society of the Divine Savior.

== New York ==
- Capuchin Theological Seminary (Garrison) - Closed in 1972; run by the Capuchin Friars Minor.
- Cathedral Preparatory Seminary (Brooklyn) - Operated from 1914 to 1985; run by the Diocese of Brooklyn.
- Don Bosco Seminary (Goshen) - Operated from 1925 to 1985; run by the Salesians of Don Bosco.
- Epiphany Apostolic College (Newburgh) - Minor seminary run by the Josephites.
- Eymard Seminary (Suffern) - Closed in 1966; run by the Fathers of the Blessed Sacrament.
- Immaculate Conception Seminary (Troy) - Closed in 1977; Operated by the Order of Friars Minor of the province of the Immaculate Conception.
- Loyola Jesuit Seminary (Shrub Oak) - Operated from 1955 to 1973; run by the Society of Jesus.
- Mater Christi Seminary (Albany) - Closed in 1969; operated by the Diocese of Albany
- Mount Alvernia Seminary (Beacon) - Operated from 1950 to 1967; run by the Italian-American Province of the Immaculate Conception of the Order of Friars Minor.
- Mount St. Alphonsus Seminary (Esopus) - Operated from 1907 to 1985 by the Congregation of the Most Holy Redeemer.
- Our Lady of Hope Mission Seminary (Newburgh) - Operated from 1946 to 1971; run by the Oblates of Mary Immaculate.
- Sacred Heart Seminary (Hempstead) - Operated from 1869 to 1994
- St. Albert Junior Seminary (Middletown) - Closed by 1991; run by the Calced Carmelite friars.
- St. Andrew-on-Hudson Major Seminary (Hyde Park) - Closed in 1968; operated by the Society of Jesus.
- St. Anthony of Padua Seminary and High School (Watkins Glen) - Operated from 1949 to 1968 in the former Glen Springs Sanitarium Resort as a seminary for high-school age candidates to the Order, closed in 1970 - Run by the Polish-American Assumption Province of the Order of Friars Minor.
- St. Anthony-on-Hudson Major Seminary (Rensselaer) - Closed in 1988; operated by the Order of Friars Minor Conventual.
- St. Francis Seminary (Staten Island) - Closed by 1997; run by the Order of Friars Minor Conventual;
- St. John's Atonement Minor Seminary (Montour Falls) - Founded in 1923 in Garrison, New York for high school and junior college age candidates to the Society, relocated in 1948 and changed to a four-year institution in 1956, closed in 1967; operated by the Franciscan Friars of the Atonement.
- St. Joseph Seraphic Seminary (Callicoon) - Operated from 1901 to 1968; run by the Holy Name Province of the Order of Friars Minor.
- St. Pius X Seminary (Garrison) - Operated from 1912 to 1969; run by the Franciscan Friars of the Atonement.
- St. Charles Seminary (Staten Island) - Operated from 1948 to 1966; run by the Missionaries of St. Charles Borromeo.
- Wadhams Hall Seminary College (Ogdensburg) - Operated from 1924 to 2002; run by the Diocese of Ogdensburg.

== North Dakota ==
- Cardinal Muench Seminary (Fargo) - Operated from 1962 to 2001; operated by the Diocese of Fargo.

== Ohio ==
- Brunnerdale Minor Seminary (Canton) - Operated from 1931 to 1981; run by the Missionaries of the Precious Blood
- Our Lady of the Angels Seminary (Cleveland) - Operated from 1907 to 1964; run by the Franciscan Friars.
- Precious Blood Seminary (Carthagena) - Operated from 1922 to 1969; run by the Missionaries of the Precious Blood
- St. John Vianney Seminary (Bloomingdale) - Operated from 1945 to 1978; run by the Diocese of Steubenville.

== Oklahoma ==
- St. Francis de Sales Seminary (Oklahoma City) - operated from 1959 to 1966 as a diocesan high school and junior college seminary by the Diocese of Oklahoma City. Staffed by priests of the Diocese of Oklahoma City.

== Pennsylvania ==
- Mary Immaculate Seminary (Allentown) - operated from 1939 to 1990; run by the Congregation of the Mission.
- St. Fidelis College Seminary (Herman) - Closed in 1979; operated by the Franciscan Capuchin Order.
- St. Mary Junior Seminary (North East) - Operated from 1881 to 1987; operated by the Redemptorists.
- St. Pius X Seminary (Dalton) - Operated from 1962 to 2004; operated by the Diocese of Scranton.

== Washington ==
- St. Edward Seminary (Kenmore) - Operated from 1930 to 1976; run by the Archdiocese of Seattle.
- St. Thomas the Apostle Seminary (Kenmore) - Operated from 1958 to 1977; run by the Archdiocese of Seattle.

== Wisconsin ==
- St. Joseph Prep Seminary (Edgerton) - Operated from ~1963 to 1980; run by the Redemptorists. School is now Oaklawn Academy.
- Holy Name Minor Seminary (Madison) - Operated from 1963 to 1995; run by the Diocese of Madison.
- St. Francis de Sales Preparatory Seminary (Milwaukee) - Operated from 1941 to 1979; run by the Archdiocese of Milwaukee.
- Holy Redeemer College (Waterford) - Operated from 1968 to 1985; run by the Redemptorists.
- Immaculate Conception Seminary (Oconomowoc) - Operated 1910 ~ 1980; run by the Redemptorists. Demolished 1989.
- Our Lady of Spring Bank (Okauchee) - Operated 1928 - ?; run by the Cistercians. Demolished.
- St Monica's Novitiate (Oconomowoc) - Operated 1955 - 1970s; run by the Augustinians. Closed. Now Genesee Lake School
- Queen of Apostles Seminary (Madison) - Operated from 1949 - 1979; run by the Pallottines. Demolished 2002 for neighborhood development of Grand View Commons.
