= St. Thomas Aquinas Preparatory Seminary =

Defunct Catholic high school

St. Thomas Aquinas Preparatory Seminary was a Catholic high school seminary located in Hannibal, Missouri in the Diocese of Jefferson City, active from 1957 to 2002.

== History ==
=== Founding ===
St. Thomas Seminary was established when Joseph Marling, installed as bishop of Jefferson City in 1956, took steps to found a high school seminary. Its doors opened in 1957, and from 1970 onward half of the priests ordained for the Diocese of Jefferson City were alumni of St. Thomas.

=== Exposure of sexual misconduct ===
Fr. Anthony O'Connell was assigned as Director of Students after his ordination in 1963. He became Spiritual Director in 1968 and was appointed Rector in 1970. O'Connell served as Director of Vocations for the Diocese of Jefferson City from 1969 to 1988. He was serving as Rector of St. Thomas Aquinas Seminary when he was appointed first Bishop of the newly created Diocese of Knoxville on June 7, 1988. In 2002, Bishop O'Connell, by then transferred to the see of Palm Beach, admitted that he molested at least two students in his care. He then resigned from the see of Palm Beach.

O’Connell brought Msgr. Manus Daly from Ireland to serve as dean of students at St. Thomas. Msgr. Daly taught at St. Thomas for more than 30 years, succeeding O’Connell as rector when the latter became the first bishop of Knoxville, Tennessee. Msgr. Daly was forced to resign as rector in 1995 after he was accused of sexual abuse of students at this high school seminary. He was then transferred to a small Catholic parish in Marceline, MO.

Father James P. McNally and Father Gary Pool were alumni whom O’Connell employed at St. Thomas and who have been identified publicly by students in their care who became their victims.

=== Closing ===
In a letter to the priests of the diocese dated April 19, 2002, Bishop John R. Gaydos of Jefferson City wrote: "The seminary has been an important part of the diocese, but we cannot ignore the impact recent headlines will have on future enrollment, which has been in decline for some years. With only 27 students this year, the school was already economically unsustainable. The events of the past six weeks have only hurried the inevitable."

Some of the school's property was transferred to the diocese, some was given away, and the remainder was sold.
