= Cathedral of Saint Joseph (Jefferson City, Missouri) =

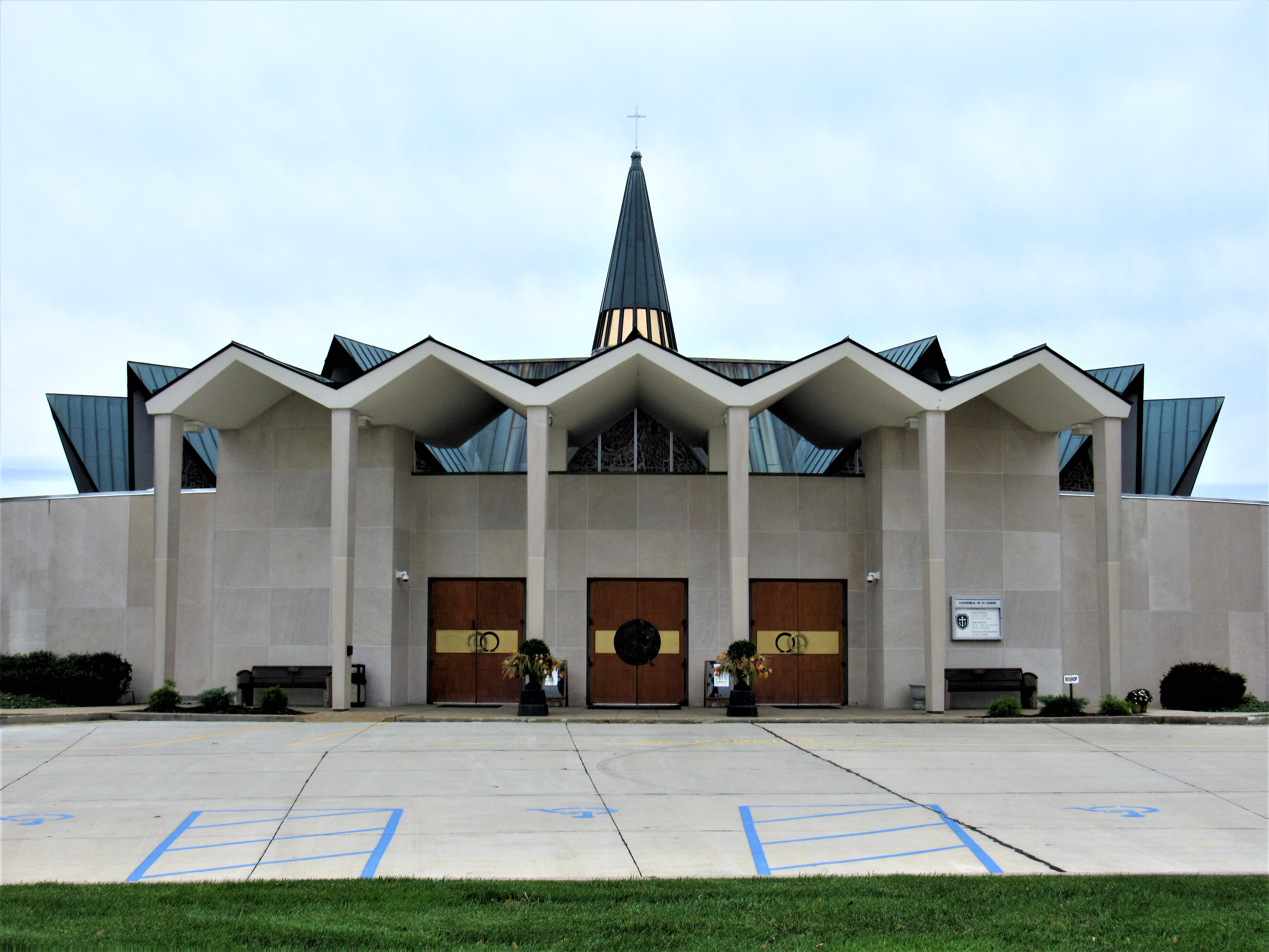

- Location within Missouri Location within the United States
- 38°35′30.12″N 92°12′37.08″W
- Location: 2215 West Main Street; Jefferson City, Missouri
- Country: United States
- Denomination: Roman Catholic Church
- Website: www.cathedraljc.org

History
- Consecrated: 1974

Architecture
- Architect(s): Maguolo and Quick
- Style: Modern
- Groundbreaking: 1967
- Completed: 1968
- Construction cost: $1,200,000 (1968 dollars)

Specifications
- Capacity: 1,200 (floor seating)
- Materials: Reinforced concrete and steel (interior); Indiana limestone (exterior)

Administration
- Diocese: Jefferson City

Clergy
- Bishop: Most Rev. Ralph Bernard O'Donnell
- Rector: Fr. Stephen Jones

The Cathedral of Saint Joseph is a Catholic cathedral serving as the mother church for the Diocese of Jefferson City in Missouri in the United States. It serves as the seat of the bishop, Ralph Bernard O'Donnell.

The cathedral occupies a 25-acre (100,000 m^{2}) campus in Jefferson City that includes a former Carmelite monastery, the Alphonse J. Schwartze Memorial Catholic Center, the St. Joseph Cathedral School, and the cathedral parish offices.

== History ==
Pope Pius XII in 1956 erected the Diocese of Jefferson City and designated St. Peter's Church in Jefferson City as its cathedral. However, Bishop Joseph M. Marling, the first bishop of Jefferson City, immediately began planning for a new cathedral.

Monsignor Joseph A. Vogelweid, the first vicar general, chose a site for the cathedral across from Memorial Park in Jefferson City. By 1966, the diocese had chosen a design for a modern, circular cathedral. The project architects were Maguolo and Quick of St. Louis, Missouri. The design of the stained glass and marble in the cathedral was performed by Robert Brunelli of Kansas City, Missouri. The contractor for the cathedral was Prost Builders of Jefferson City.

The groundbreaking for the Cathedral of Saint Joseph was held on August 20, 1967. The first mass in the new cathedral was celebrated on December 25, 1968 and the first diocesan priest was ordained there in 1969. Michael F. McAuliffe was consecrated as bishop of Jefferson City and installed at the cathedral that same year.The Cathedral of Saint Joseph was consecrated on May 5, 1974. Cardinal John Joseph Carberry presided over the consecration and was assisted by both Marling and McAuliffe.

As of 2026, the pastor of the cathedral parish is Stephen Jones.

== Cathedral interior ==
=== Sacristy ===
The sacristy is located at the entrance of the cathedral, permitting processions to and from the altar. The Bishop's private sacristy was installed in 2005 adjacent to the main sacristy.

=== Adoration Chapel ===
The Adoration Chapel allows worshippers to participate in perpetual adoration of the eucharist. The diocese inaugurated this practice in 1986. The chapel is adjacent to main seating area of the cathedral.

=== Baptistry ===
The baptistry is also located at the cathedral entrance. The baptistry was remodeled in 2006. Two skylights in the ceiling provide natural sunlight over the font The font is the original Italian marble baptistry made for the cathedral. The floor is made of marble similar to that the sanctuary.

An ambry, built in 2004 of wood and glass, is located in the baptistry. It contains the oil of the sick, the Sacred Chrism, and the oil of the Catechumens, A statue of the Risen Christ is also present.

=== Pipe organ ===
The cathedral contains a three-keyboard Wicks pipe organ with 1,758 pipes made of wood and metal. The pipe ranges in size from 16 feet (4.9 m) long to several inches. The choir normally stands below the pipes during important mass celebrations. In 2006, the Vatican organist, James Edward Goettsche, performed a concert for the golden anniversary for the diocese.

=== Nave ===
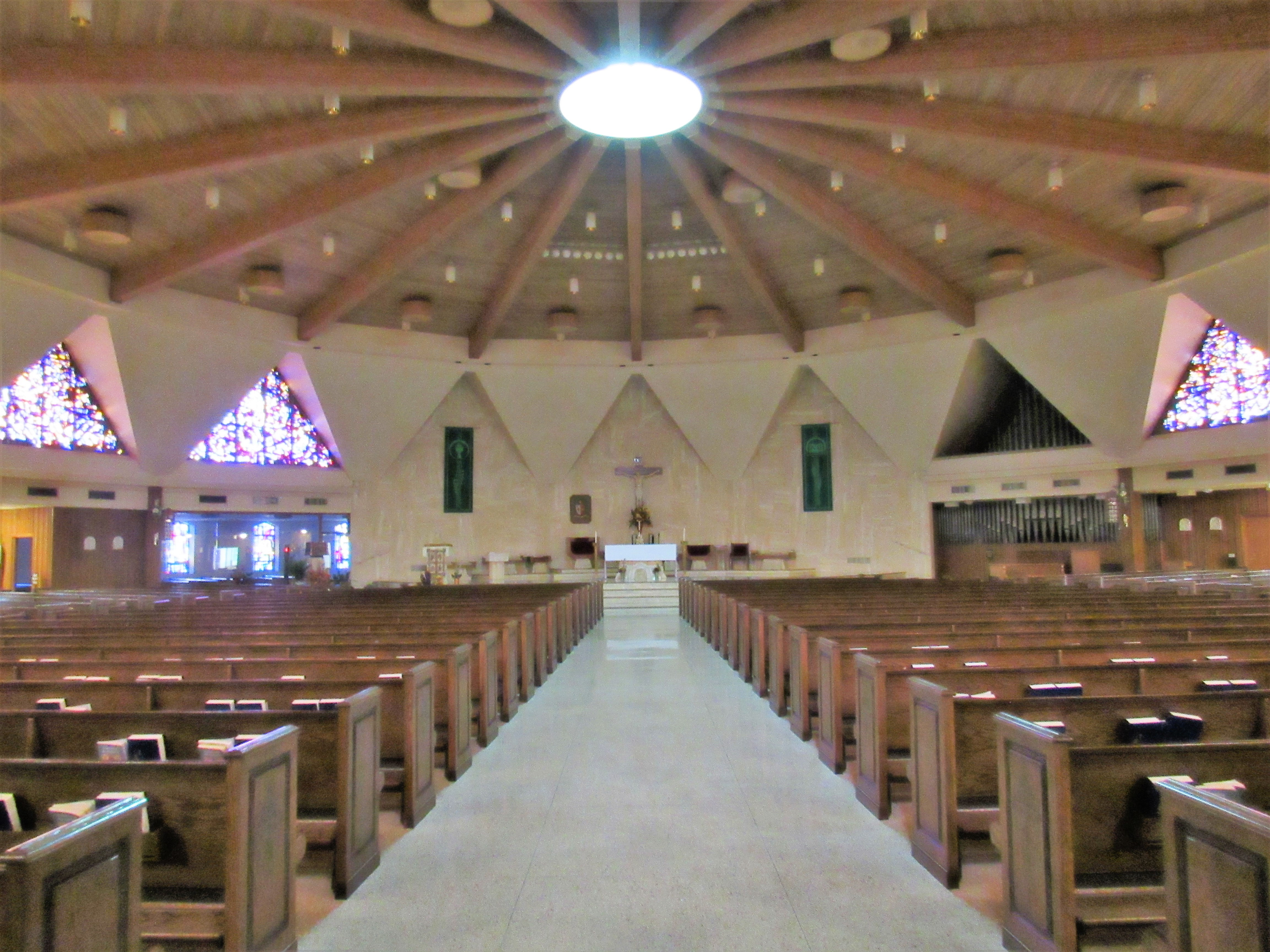
Cathedral Interior (2019)

The cathedral nave seats 950 people. It has 19,000 square feet (1,800 m^{2}) of terrazzo flooring. The main aisle runs 88 feet (27 m) from the glass doors to the altar. The nave contains twelve pillars covered in walnut. Candles for each pillar were added in 2009 by Bishop John R. Gaydos. Padded walls, covered in mesh, with strips of walnut help to absorb the noise. Other acoustical features include the padded red oak pews, as well as the decorative faceted glass windows.

The nave contains 12 triangular stained glass windows. As one moves from the sanctuary, on either side, the color in the windows grows proportionately lighter to surround a figure of the Risen Christ over the doors of the cathedral.

=== Sanctuary ===
The sanctuary has walls made of polished buff travertine limestone. Its steps and raised surfaces are constructed of contrasting walnut travertine. The sanctuary itself is oval-shaped and was designed specifically for ceremonies in which the bishop presides and for post-Vatican II liturgy.

The main altar is composed of a single block of polished marble weighing 7,000 pounds (3,200 kg). It contains relics from Saint Clement, Saint Irenaeus, and Saint Aurelius. The cathedra, or bishop's throne, sits beneath the bishop's coat of arms on the sanctuary wall. The crucifix, with a corpus of walnut travertine, is suspended from the wall. The corpus is 5 feet (1.5 m) tall and weighs over 450 pounds (200 kg).

=== Artwork ===
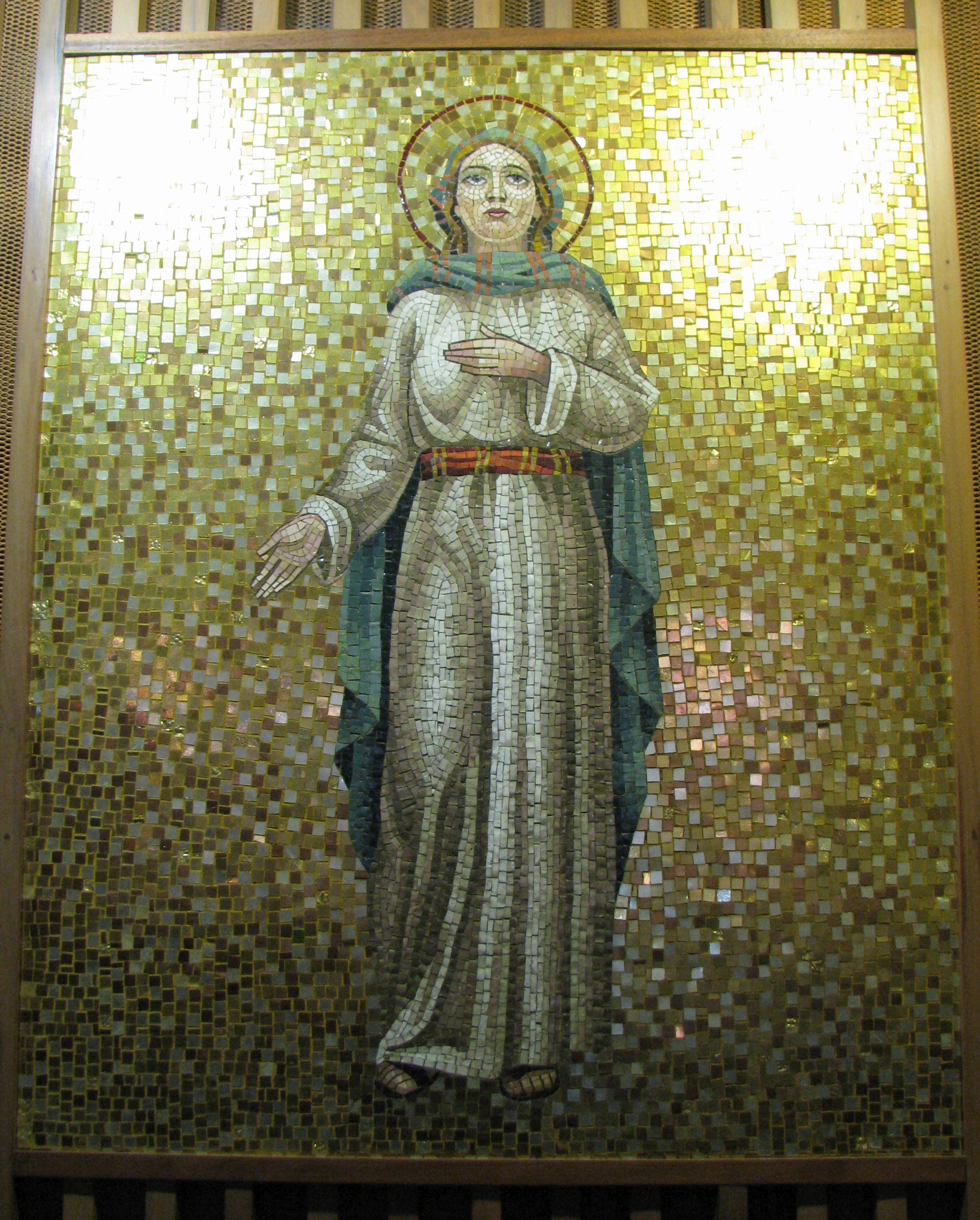
Mosaic of St. Anne (2009)

Marble figures of St. Joseph and of the Blessed Virgin Mary stand in wall niches in the cathedral. A figure of the Sacred Heart of Jesus stands at the Blessed Sacrament Chapel to the left of the nave. Each of these figures is five feet tall and is made of unpolished travertine. The sculptors' tool marks are still visible in the figures.

The cathedral displays three mosaics:

- Infant Jesus of Prague
- Our Lady of Perpetual Help, the Virgin Mary
- St. Anne, the mother of the Virgin Mary

There are fourteen polished marble Stations of the Cross hanging around the seating area.. They were donated to the cathedral by the LaSallette Seminary. The statuary, mosaics, and stations were imported from Italy.

=== Blessed Sacrament Chapel ===
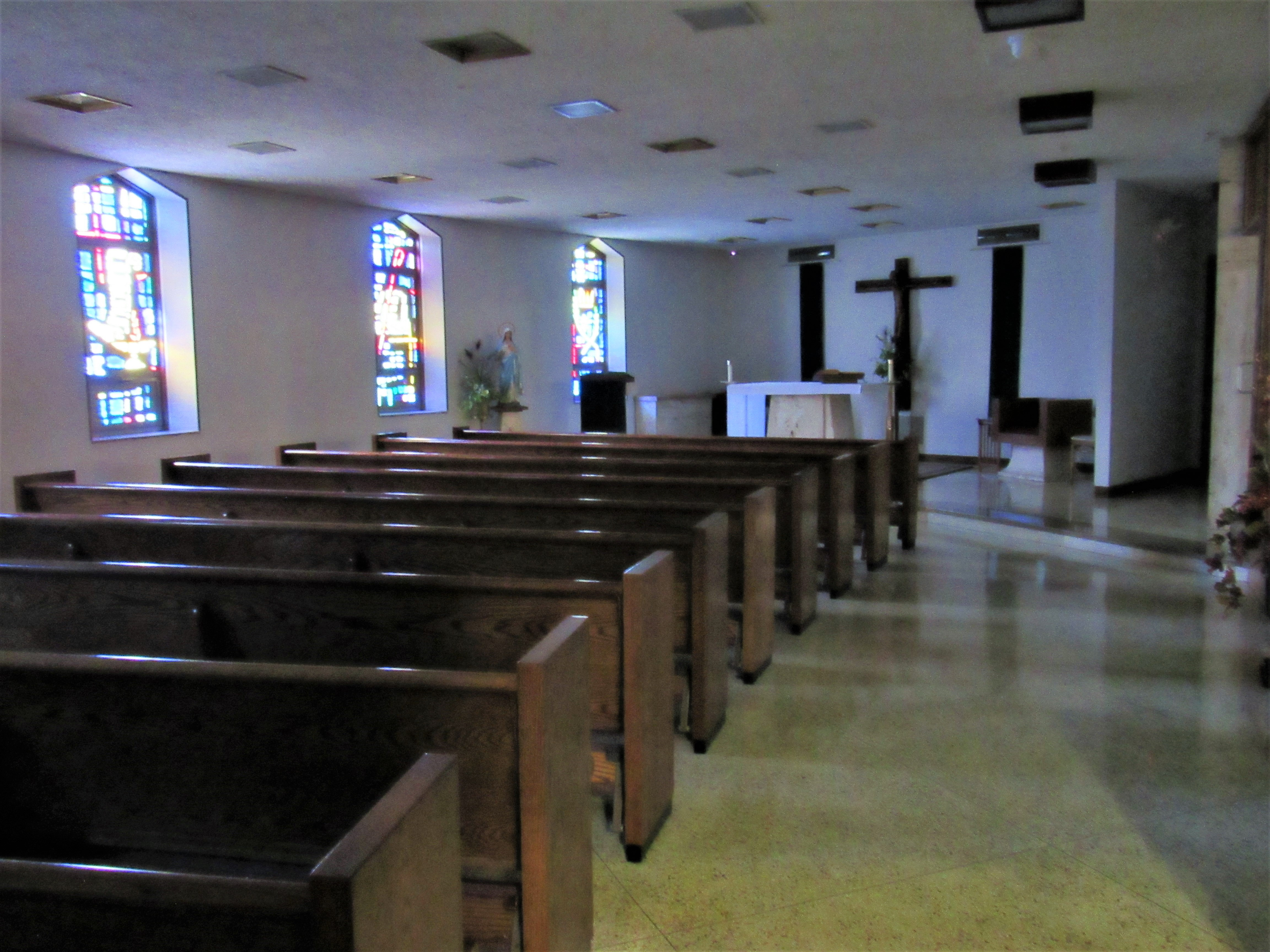
Blessed Sacrament Chapel (2019)

The Blessed Sacrament Chapel is to the left of the sanctuary. A glass partition separates it from the rest of the main seating area. The chapel seating capacity is 50 people. The chapel altar contains relics from the following saints:

- Saint Clement
- Irenaeus – a Greek bishop and church father of the 2nd century CE
- Liberatus of Carthage – a church historian of the 6th century

Five faceted glass windows in the chapel, created by Jacoby Studios in St. Louis, symbolize the functions of the priest.

- The first window pictures the carpenter's hammer and square associated with Saint Joseph, patron of priests.
- The second window shows the Greek symbols Chi-Rho, with rings and leaves
- The third window displays a scroll and lamp
- The fourth window pictures a shepherd's crook and book
- The fifth window shows crossed branches, a crown, and a star.

The chapel also contains the Jubilee Cross, which has a purported relic of the True Cross. The cross was created by Lage's Cabinet Shop of Jefferson City for the Jubilee Year of 2000. A minor sacristy attached to the chapel.

=== Undercroft ===
The cathedral features an undercroft that serves as a multi-purpose room. It is accessed via doors that open to the south.

== Cathedral exterior ==
=== Architecture ===
The cathedral is built of reinforced concrete and steel, with an exterior facade of Indiana limestone. The cathedral is 157 feet (48 m) in diameter. The ceiling, 72 feet (22 m) high, is made of Douglas fir. It is supported by 16 laminated wood beams that are approximately 60 feet (18 m) long. The beams meet at a steel ring in the center that is 9 feet (2.7 m) in diameter. The ring creates an oculus, from which the spire rises to a height of 29 feet (8.8 m). The copper roof has 16 gables in a design that emulates a crown.

=== Doors ===
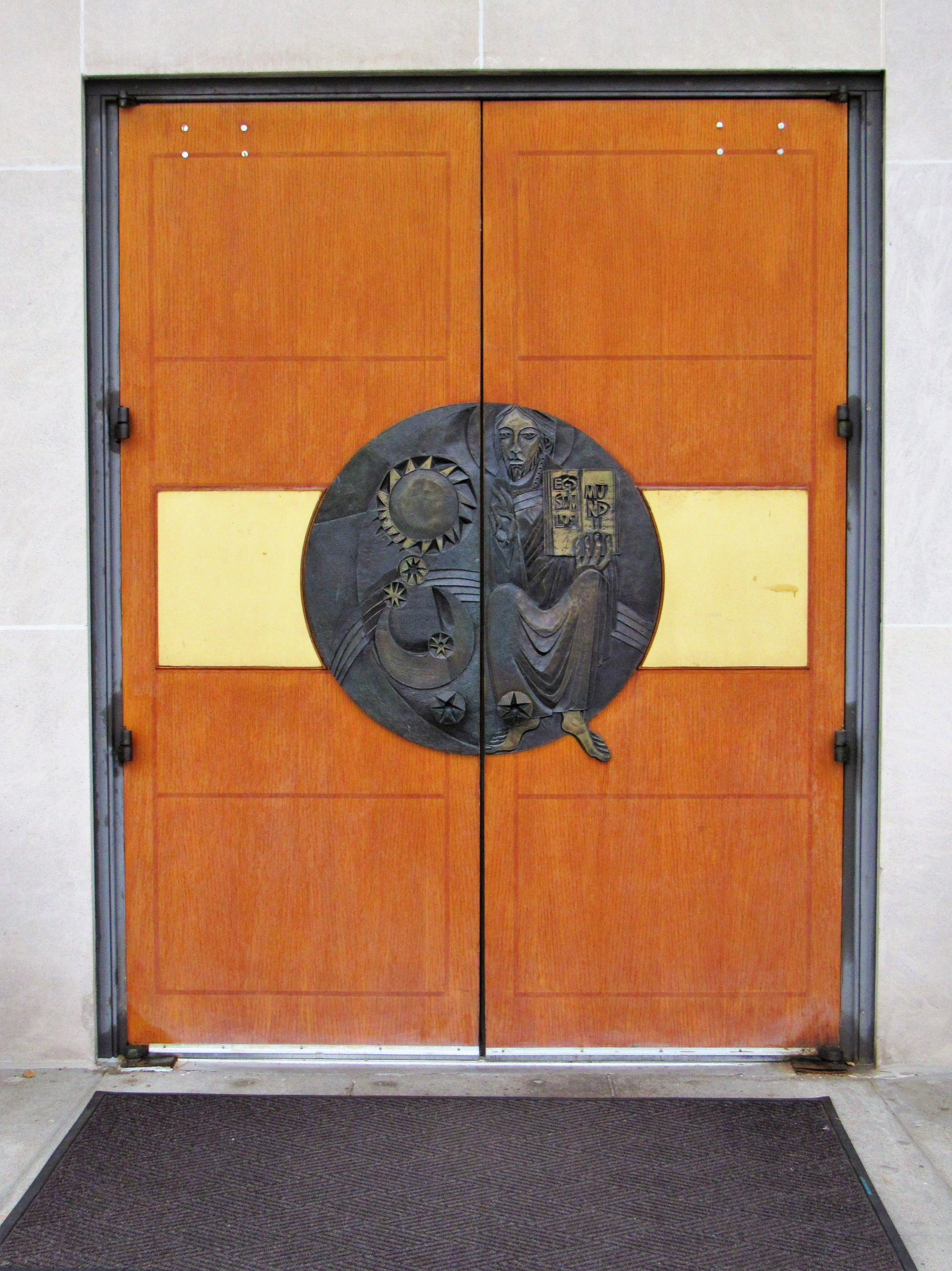
Center doors, cathedral (2019)

The main doors of the cathedral are 500 pounds (230 kg) each. Due to the building standing on a slope, the doors open at ground level. The doors were designed by the Marianist brother Stephen Erspammer of St. Louis. The right and left sets of doors have handles in the shape of a Greek Alpha and Omega.

A bronze medallion, embedded in the center set of doors, depicts an eternal Christ, seated among the sun, moon, stars, and rainbows of the heavens.

- One hand makes the ancient gesture of a teacher.
- The other hand holds a book of Scriptures, showing the Latin phrase "Ego sum lux mundi," (I am the light of the world).

The Christ image is situated on one side of the medallion, so that it remains whole, even when the cathedral doors are open. The doors were commissioned and blessed by Bishop Gaydos in June 2001.

=== Grounds ===
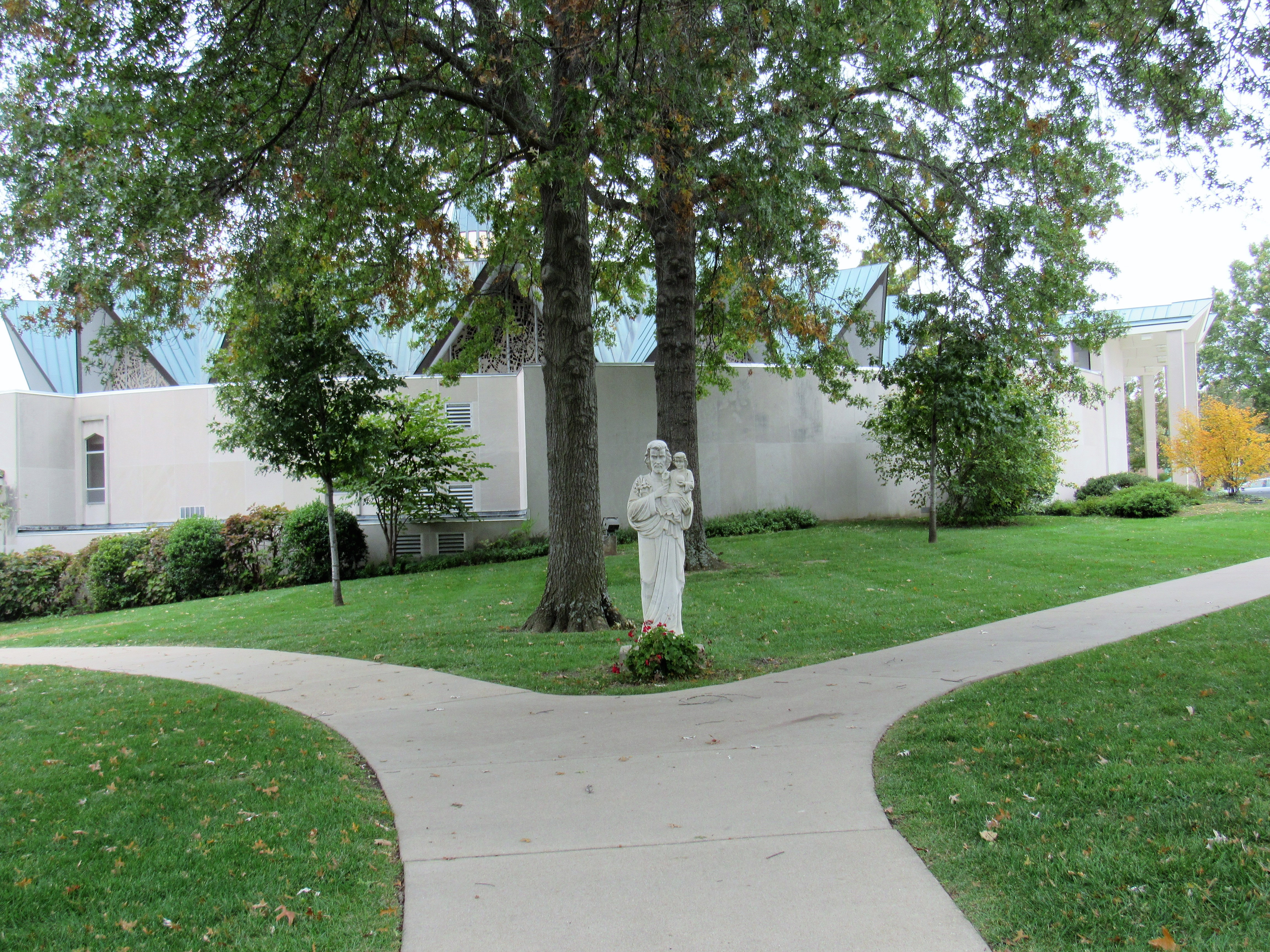
Statue of St. Joseph, cathedral grounds (2019)

The cathedral campus features a 5-foot (1.5 m) solid marble statue of St. Joseph and the Christ Child on the east lawn. The Archdiocese of St. Louis donated the statue to the cathedral in 2005, taking it from a closed parish in St. Louis. The east lawn has a pin oak, known as the Pentecost Tree, that was planted by Bishop Gaydos in 1999. The tree bed contains soil samples from each parish in the diocese.

The bishop's entrance to the cathedral has a concrete sculpture of St. Francis and the animals. Created by the sculptor Siegfried Reinhardt of St. Louis, the sculpture was donated to the cathedral in 2009 by a parishioner. There is a cornerstone also near the bishop's entrance. A limestone-engraved sign, installed in 1985, is installed on the front lawn.

The south lawn of the cathedral includes a grotto of Our Lady of Fatima, with concrete figures of the Blessed Mother, the three seers of Fatima, and animals. It was donated to the cathedral by LaSalette Seminary. The grotto was restored in 2009.

== St. Joseph Cathedral School ==
St. Joseph Cathedral School (SJCS) was constructed as a combination church and school building in 1959. The school opened in 1960, with classes for grades 1st through 6th grades on the second floor. The Sisters of Mercy of Swinford in Ireland, served as administrators and faculty for SJCS. They occupied a separate convent building that also held additional classrooms. SJCS added the 7th and 8th grades in 1961. When the cathedral opened in 1968, SJCS took over the entire building. That same year, the school hired its first lay teachers.

In 1984, SJCS added six classrooms, a music room, a science lab, a computer lab and a special service classrooms to the main school building. They established programs for kindergarten, enrichment, and early morning and after school in 1986. Two years later, the Sisters of Mercy withdrew from SJCS, with the school being fully staffed by lay personnel. A preschool was opened in 1995.

SJCS in 2008 added a new library, cafeteria and kitchen, computer and science labs, administrative offices and sixteen new classrooms. By 2010, enrollment had reached 500 students. In 2018, the gymnasium was enlarged and a new stage was added to the theater. As of 2026, the SJCS principal is Gina Bailey.

== Gallery ==
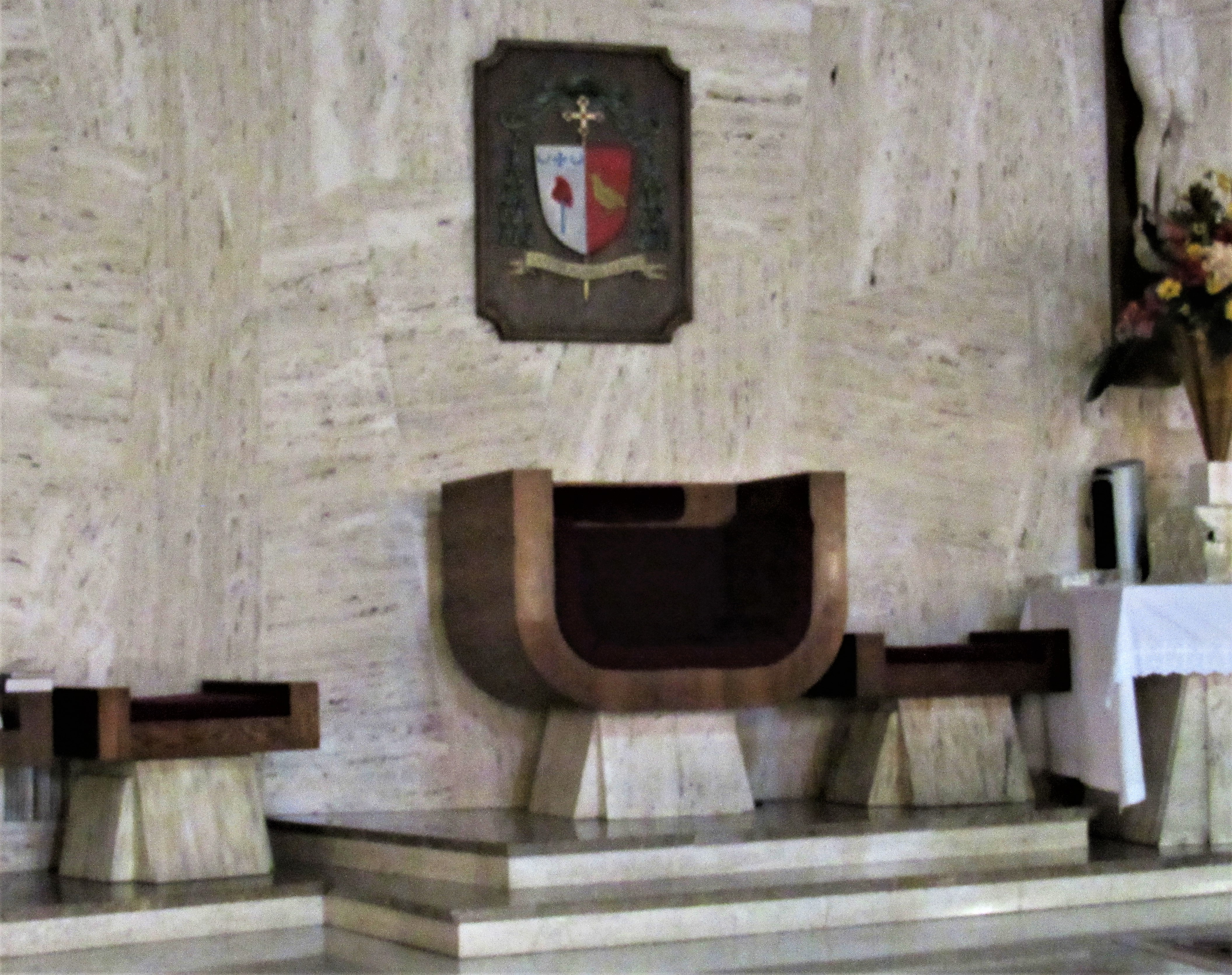
Cathedra (2019)

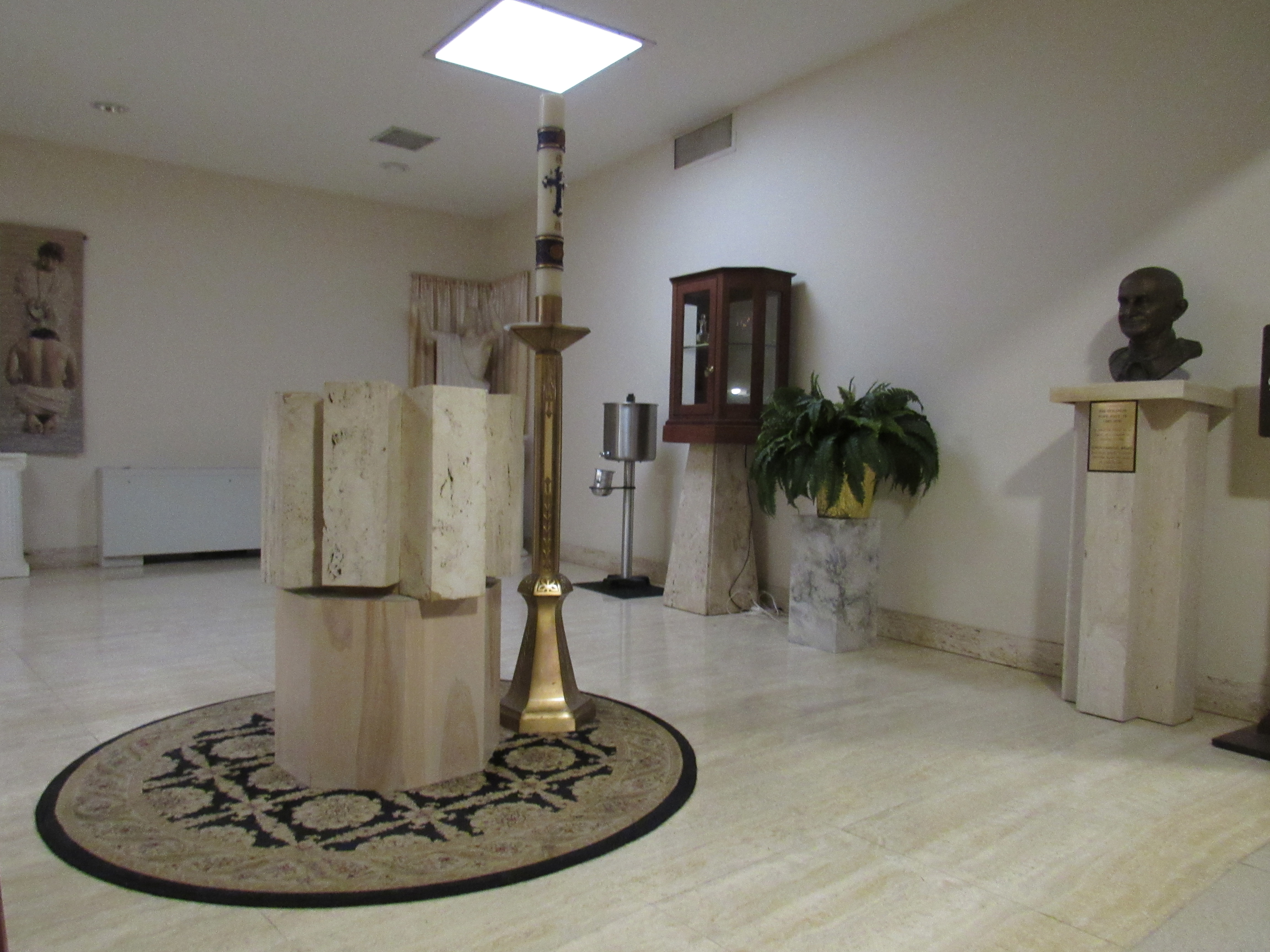
Baptistry (2019)

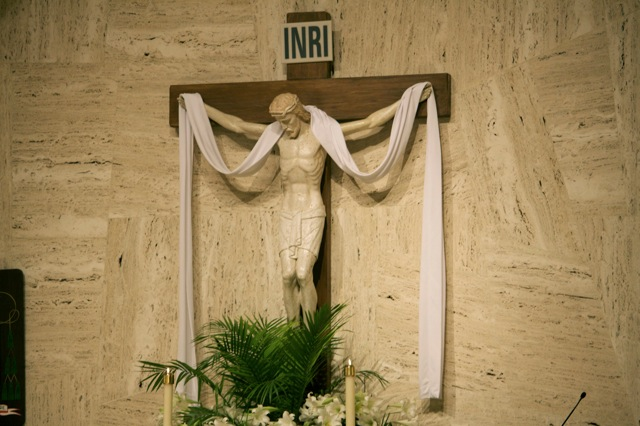
Crucifix in sanctuary (2009)

== See also ==
- List of Catholic cathedrals in the United States
- List of cathedrals in the United States
