= Anthony O'Connell =

American Roman Catholic Bishop (resigned 2002

His Excellency, The Most Reverend Anthony Joseph O'Connell
- Bishop of Palm Beach
- Diocese: Diocese of Palm Beach
- Installed: January 14, 1999
- Term ended: March 13, 2002
- Predecessor: Joseph Keith Symons
- Successor: Seán Patrick O'Malley
- Previous post: Bishop of Knoxville (1988 to 1998)

Orders
- Ordination: March 30, 1963 by Joseph M. Marling
- Consecration: September 8, 1988 by Pio Laghi

Personal details
- Born: May 10, 1938 Lisheen, County Clare, Ireland
- Died: May 4, 2012 (aged 73) Mepkin Abbey, Moncks Corner, South Carolina, U.S.
- Denomination: Roman Catholicism
- Education: Mungret College; Kenrick Seminary
- Motto: The harvest is plenty

Anthony J. O'Connell (May 10, 1938 – May 4, 2012) was an Irish-born prelate of the Roman Catholic church. He served as the first bishop of the Diocese of Knoxville in Tennessee from 1988 to 1998. He later served as the third bishop of the Diocese of Palm Beach in Florida from 1999 to 2002.

O'Connell resigned as bishop of Palm Beach in 2002 after admitting to the sexual abuse of minors years earlier.

== Biography ==
=== Early life ===
O'Connell was born on May 10, 1938, in Lisheen, County Clare, Ireland. He studied at Mount St Joseph in Cork and at Mungret College in Limerick. He emigrated to the U.S. at age 20 and entered Kenrick Seminary in St. Louis, Missouri.

=== Priesthood ===
On March 30, 1963, O'Connell was ordained a priest at St. Peter Cathedral in Jefferson City, Missouri, by Bishop Joseph Mary Marling for the Diocese of Jefferson City. Following his ordination, O'Connell was assigned as director of students at St. Thomas Aquinas Preparatory Seminary in Hannibal, Missouri. He was named spiritual director in 1968 and was appointed rector in 1970.

O'Connell served as director of vocations for the diocese from 1969 to 1988. He was a member of the diocesan Commission for Personnel and president of the Priests' Senate. He was serving as rector of St. Thomas Aquinas Seminary before becoming bishop.

=== Bishop of Knoxville ===
O'Connell was appointed by Pope John Paul II as the first bishop of the newly created Diocese of Knoxville on June 7, 1988. On September 8, 1988, O'Connell was consecrated at the Holiday Inn Convention Center in Knoxville, Tennessee, with Archbishop Pio Laghi served as principal consecrator and Bishop James Niedergeses and Bishop Michael McAuliffe serving as principal co-consecrators.

=== Bishop of Palm Beach ===
On November 12, 1998, John Paul II appointed O'Connell as the third bishop of Palm Beach, replacing J. Keith Symons, who resigned after admitting he molested five boys early in his priesthood.

=== Resignation and legacy ===
On March 8, 2002, O'Connell admitted that he had molested at least two students of St. Thomas Aquinas Preparatory Seminary during his 25-year career there. That same day, O'Connell offered his resignation as bishop of Palm Beach to the Vatican. It was accepted by Pope John Paul II on March 13, 2002. After his resignation, O'Connell moved to Mepkin Abbey in Moncks Corner, South Carolina, to live a life of penance and prayer under supervision.

Later in March, Christopher Dixon, a former priest from Missouri, accused O'Connell of sexually molesting him as a teenage seminarian at St. Thomas when O'Connell was rector of the seminary. After reporting the abuse in 1995, the Diocese of Jefferson City gave him a $125,000 settlement on condition that he sign a non-disclosure agreement. That same month, four former students, including two identified in media reports as "John C.C. Doe" and "Alexander", made allegations in regard to O'Connell's actions against students in his charge. The extent of O'Connell's transgressions was documented by Time magazine on March 22, 2002, noting that "Jefferson City diocese had been receiving complaints about sexual abuse by O'Connell as early as 1967."

Anthony O'Connell died on May 4, 2012, at age 73, at Mepkin Abbey. His funeral mass was celebrated on May 7, 2012, at Mepkin Abbey.

Michael Boyd, a Knoxville native, sued the Diocese of Knoxville on July 18, 2019, claiming that, when he was an altar boy, he was abused by Reverend Xavier Mankel and O'Connell. The diocese settled the suit out of court for undisclosed terms, and the diocese admitted no wrongdoing in the settlement.

Catholic Church titles
Preceded by Inaugural appointment	Bishop of Knoxville; 1988–1998	Succeeded by Joseph Edward Kurtz
Preceded by Joseph Keith Symons	Bishop of Palm Beach; 1999–2002	Succeeded by Seán Patrick O'Malley
