= John R. Gaydos =

American Roman Catholic prelate (1943–2025)

His Excellency, The Most Reverend John Raymond Gaydos
- Bishop of Jefferson City
- Archdiocese: St. Louis
- Diocese: Jefferson City
- Appointed: June 25, 1997
- Installed: August 27, 1997
- Retired: November 21, 2017
- Predecessor: Michael Francis McAuliffe
- Successor: Shawn McKnight

Orders
- Ordination: December 20, 1968 by Francis Frederick Reh
- Consecration: August 27, 1997 by Justin Francis Rigali, Michael Francis McAuliffe, and Oscar Hugh Lipscomb

Personal details
- Born: August 14, 1943 St. Louis, Missouri, U.S.
- Died: September 6, 2025 (aged 82) Kirkwood, Missouri, U.S.
- Education: St. Louis Preparatory Seminary; Kenrick-Glennon Seminary; Pontifical Gregorian University
- Motto: With a shepherd's care

Styles of John Raymond Gaydos
- Reference style: His Excellency; The Most Reverend
- Spoken style: Your Excellency
- Religious style: Bishop

John Raymond Gaydos (August 14, 1943 – September 6, 2025) was an American prelate of the Roman Catholic Church. He served as bishop of the Diocese of Jefferson City in Missouri from 1997 to 2017.

== Biography ==
=== Early years ===
John Gaydos was born on August 14, 1943, in St. Louis, Missouri, to George and Carrie (née Lee) Gaydos. He graduated from St. Agnes School in 1957, then entered St. Louis Preparatory Seminary in St. Louis. In 1961, Gaydos entered Cardinal Glennon College at Kenrick-Glennon Seminary in Shrewsbury, Missouri.

In 1965, Gaydos traveled to Rome to reside at the Pontifical North American College while attending the Pontifical Gregorian University. He obtained his Bachelor of Sacred Theology degree in dogmatic theology in 1969.

=== Priesthood ===
On December 20, 1968, Gaydos was ordained to the priesthood for the Archdiocese of Saint Louis by Bishop Francis Reh in St. Peter's Basilica in Rome.

After returning to Missouri, Gaydos was assigned as associate pastor of St. Joseph Parish in Manchester, Missouri, until 1974. He was then transferred to be associate pastor at St. Cecilia Parish in St. Louis, serving there until 1977. Gaydos was appointed as priest-secretary to Cardinal John Carberry and as vice-chancellor of St. Louis from 1977 to 1981. He then became secretary to Archbishop John May and full chancellor until 1990. Gaydos became pastor of St. Gerard Majella Parish in Kirkwood, Missouri in 1990, and vicar general of the archdiocese on February 14, 1996.

=== Bishop of Jefferson City ===
On June 25, 1997, Pope John Paul II appointed Gaydos as the third bishop of Jefferson City. He was consecrated on August 27, 1997, by Archbishop Justin Rigali, with Bishop Michael McAuliffe and Archbishop Oscar Lipscomb serving as co-consecrators, at the Cathedral of Saint Joseph in Jefferson City.

As bishop, Gaydos established a branch of Catholic Charities USA. He built the Alphonse J. Schwartze Memorial Catholic Center in Jefferson City to consolidate all the diocesan ministries and Father Tolton Regional Catholic High School in Columbia, Missouri.

Within the United States Conference of Catholic Bishops (USCCB), Gaydos served as chair of the Committee on Priestly Life and Ministry, and was a member of the Ad Hoc Committee on Sexual Abuse, the Administrative Committee, and the Committee for Communications.

==== O'Connell sex abuse case ====
On March 19, 2002, Gaydos and the diocese were sued by a former student at St. Thomas Aquinas Preparatory Seminary in Hannibal, Missouri. The plaintiff claimed that Bishop Anthony J. O'Connell, then rector at the seminary, had sexually exploited him. In May 2002, facing declining enrollment at the seminary and pending lawsuits, Gaydos closed it.

In March 2002, it was revealed that the diocese had made a secret settlement of $125,000 in 1996 to a former seminarian who claimed to have been sexually abused by O'Connell in 1969 at the seminary. In 1988, O'Connell was named bishop of the Diocese of Knoxville; it is unknown if Gaydos had informed John Paul II about the O'Connell settlement before he appointed O'Connell as bishop. In 2002, O'Connell admitting abusing two boys at the seminary and resigned as bishop of Palm Beach.

==== Other sexual abuse cases ====
In 2003, Gaydos and the diocese were named in a sexual abuse lawsuit by a Missouri man. The plaintiff alleged that Reverend Gary Pool and Reverend Kevin Clohessy had sexually abused him for most of his childhood.

On September 3, 2015, the diocese settled for $40,000 a long-standing sexual abuse claim by David Clohessy, the brother of Kevin Clohessy, against Reverend John Whiteley. David Clohessy had sued the diocese in 1991, claiming that Whiteley, then a pastor at St. Pius X Parish in Moberly, Missouri, had sexually abused him. Clohessy's case was dismissed in 1993 due to the Missouri statute of limitations. However, Clohessy renewed his claim in 2015 and the diocese decided that it was credible.

=== Retirement and death ===
In 2017, Gaydos sent a letter of resignation to Pope Francis, asking for early retirement as bishop of Jefferson City for health reasons. These were later described as hypertension, arterial fibrillation, and the need for heart valve replacement. The pope accepted his resignation on November 21, 2017.

Gaydos died at the St. Agnes senior care home in Kirkwood, Missouri, on September 6, 2025, at the age of 82.

== Episcopal succession ==
Catholic Church titles
Preceded by Michael Francis McAuliffe	Bishop of Jefferson City; 1997–2017	Succeeded by Shawn McKnight
