= William Shawn McKnight =

American Catholic prelate (born 1968)

His Excellency, The Most Reverend William Shawn McKnight
- Archbishop of Kansas City in Kansas
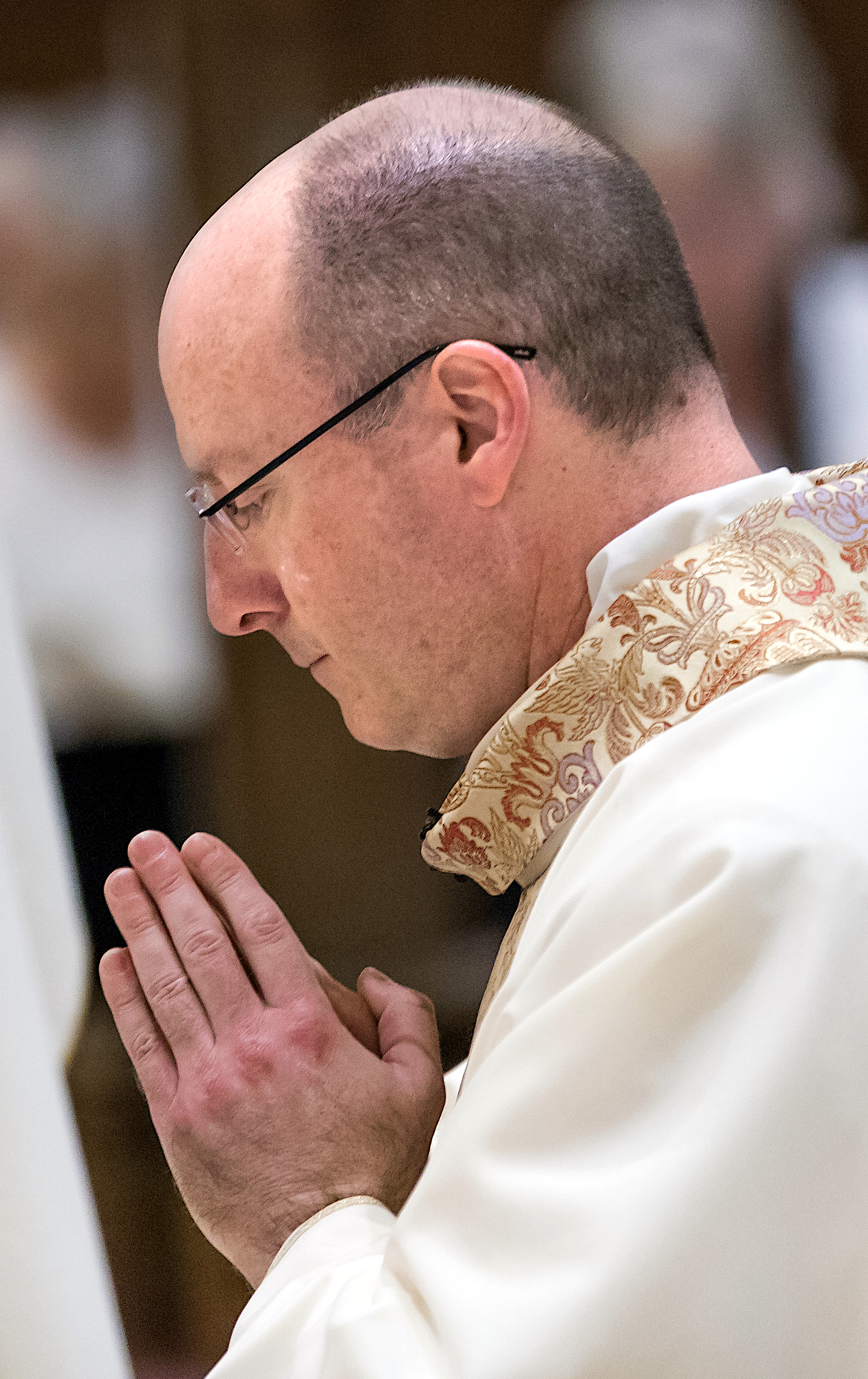
- McKnight at his 2018 ordination
- Archdiocese: Kansas City in Kansas
- Appointed: April 8, 2025
- Installed: May 27, 2025
- Predecessor: Joseph Fred Naumann
- Previous post: Bishop of Jefferson City (2018-2025)

Orders
- Ordination: May 28, 1994 by Eugene John Gerber
- Consecration: February 6, 2018 by Robert James Carlson, John R. Gaydos, and Carl A. Kemme

Personal details
- Born: June 26, 1968 (age 57) Wichita, Kansas, US
- Education: University of Dallas; Pontifical College Josephinum; Pontifical Athenaeum of St. Anselm
- Motto: Gratias agamus Domino (Latin for 'Let us give thanks to the Lord')
- Styles
- Reference style: His Excellency; The Most Reverend
- Spoken style: Your Excellency
- Religious style: Archbishop

Coat of arms as bishop of Jefferson City

William Shawn McKnight (born June 26, 1968) is an American Catholic prelate serving as the Archbishop of Kansas City in Kansas since 2025. He previously served as Bishop of Jefferson City from 2017 to 2025.

== Biography ==
=== Early life ===
McKnight was born June 26, 1968, in Wichita, Kansas, to William and Mary McKnight. He has one sister and five brothers. Planning a career in medicine, McKnight attended the University of Dallas in Texas. During a retreat conducted by a university chaplain, McKnight started thinking about becoming a priest.

After receiving a Bachelor of Science degree in biochemistry from the University of Dallas in 1990, McKnight entered the Pontifical College Josephinum in Columbus, Ohio. He was awarded Master of Theology and Master of Divinity degrees by the Josephinum in 1994.

=== Priesthood ===
McKnight was ordained a priest at the Cathedral of the Immaculate Conception in Wichita by Bishop Eugene Gerber on May 28, 1994, for the Diocese of Wichita. After his 1994 ordination, the diocese assigned McKnight as parochial vicar at Blessed Sacrament Parish in Wichita.

McKnight traveled to Rome in 1997 to study at the Pontifical Athenaeum of St. Anselm, receiving a Licentiate in Sacred Theology in 1999. After his return to Kansas that year, the diocese appointed him as parish administrator for Saint Patrick Parish in Chanute, Kansas. In 2000, he was also named chaplain at Newman University in Wichita. In 2001, McKnight reenrolled at the Athenaeum, where he was awarded a Doctor of Sacred Theology degree in 2001.

In 2003, McKnight went to Ohio to become director of liturgy and faculty member of the Josephinum. He was also assigned to the pastoral staff of St. Mary's Parish in the Diocese of Columbus. During his five years at the Josephinum, McKnight also held the following posts:

- Dean of students from 2004 to 2006
- Director of formation from 2006 to 2007
- Vice-president for development and alumni relations from 2007 to 2008

After coming back to Kansas in 2008, the Diocese of Wichita assigned McKnight as pastor of Blessed Sacrament Parish in Wichita, a posting he would hold for three years.

In 2010, McKnight went to Washington, D.C. to serve the US Conference of Catholic Bishops (USCCB) in their Secretariat for Clergy, Consecrated Life and Vocations. This position assists priests in their ministry, assists the Committee on Child and Youth Protection, and addresses priesthood concerns with the public.

After completing his term at the USCCB in 2015, McKnight was appointed pastor of Magdalen Parish in Wichita. He served there from 2015 to 2018.

=== Bishop of Jefferson City ===
Pope Francis appointed McKnight as bishop of Jefferson City on November 21, 2017. McKnight was the fifth bishop to come from the Diocese of Wichita since 1998. He was consecrated on February 6, 2018.

In November 2018, McKnight released a list of 33 diocesan priests and religious brothers with credible accusations of sexual abuse of minors. He made this statement:

“Today there can be no secrets in our diocese. I pledge to put the care of victims, their loved ones and their communities first and foremost. Our long-standing Catholic social teachings require that we afford a preferential option for the poor, and this is most especially the case for those who have been victimized by the clergy of our own Church."

McKnight is part of the planning team for the Science and Faith in Seminary Formation Project at John Carroll University. The project goal is to:

“...allow Roman Catholic seminarians and clergy to engage the bigger questions of science that are naturally a part of theological inquiry and pertinent to contemporary Christians who live in a world deeply influenced, if not dominated, by science and technology.”

In November 2024, McKnight garnered controversy for issuing and swiftly rescinding a decree that banned several popular hymns, including “All Are Welcome” by Marty Haugen, from diocesan liturgies. The decree had the name “Suggested Mass Settings and Prohibited Hymns.” After receiving passionate responses from the Catholic community, McKnight replaced the decree with a new directive emphasizing synodal consultation on liturgical music.

=== Metropolitan Archbishop of Kansas City in Kansas ===
On April 8, 2025, Pope Francis appointed him as metropolitan archbishop of Kansas City in Kansas. He was installed on May 27, 2025.

== Lectures and classes ==
- The National Association of Diaconate Directors (NADD), the National Diaconate Institute for Continuing Education and other Diaconate programs have invited McKnight to be a speaker at their gatherings.
- In 2005, McKnight taught a class at the Josephinum called “The Latin Rite Deacon”.
- The St. Meinrad Permanent Deacon Formation Program at St Meinrad Seminary in Indiana offered a class called “Theology of the Deacon”, instructed by McKnight from 2005 to 2010.

== Publications ==
McKnight wrote a dissertation on the permanent diaconate under the guidance of Reverend James Puglisi. The Deacon Reader and The have published some of McKnight's diaconate writings. McKnight is the author of Understanding the Diaconate, published by the Catholic University of America Press. An excerpt states,

“Understanding the diaconate adds the resources of sociology and anthropology to the theological sources of scripture, liturgy, patristic era texts, theologians, and magisterial teachings to conclude that the deacon can be understood as "social intermediary and symbol of communities" who serves the participation of the laity in the life and mission of the Church. This research proposes the deacon as a servant of the bond of communion within the Church (facilitating the relationship between the bishop or priest and his people), and between the People of God and the individual in need.”

Catholic Church titles
Preceded by Joseph Fred Naumann	Archbishop of Kansas City in Kansas; 2025-Present	Succeeded by Incumbent
Preceded by John R. Gaydos	Bishop of Jefferson City; 2018-2025	Succeeded by Ralph Bernard O'Donnell
