= Cardinal Muench Seminary =

Roman Catholic minor seminary

- Former name: St. Pius X Minor Seminary
- Type: Roman Catholic minor seminary
- Active: 1962–May 13, 2011
- Affiliations: Diocese of Fargo
- Rector: Gregory Schlesselmann (2011)
- Students: 10 (2011)
- Location: Fargo, North Dakota, United States
- Language: English
- Patron saint: St. Pius X
- Website: www.cardinalmuench.org

Cardinal Muench Seminary was a minor seminary located in Fargo, North Dakota. Founded in 1962 as the seminary of the Catholic Diocese of Fargo, it reached a peak enrollment of 84 seminarians in 1978. Enrollment declined in the years that followed, and the seminary closed in 2011 due to low enrollment and high costs.

== History ==
During the 1950s and 1960s, the Diocese of Fargo, as with dioceses all across the United States, experienced a boom in vocations to the priesthood. Fargo had 97 seminarians by 1956, up from 60 five years earlier. The Bishop of Fargo, Cardinal Aloisius Joseph Muench, wished to establish a seminary, but retired in 1959 before the project could be begun.

In 1957, a powerful tornado struck the city of Fargo, destroying hundreds of homes on the north side as well as damaging Sacred Heart Convent and Shanley High School. Cardinal Muench's successor, Bishop Leo Ferdinand Dworschak, instructed that the now-vacant Sacred Heart Convent be reconstructed as a minor seminary for high school boys. St. Pius X Minor Seminary opened in autumn 1962. After Cardinal Muench died in February of that year, the seminary was renamed in his honor, though it still remained under the patronage of St. Pius X. Bishop Dworschak expounded on the reason for the renaming, writing at the time:

"Before he could launch the project of a seminary he was called upon to exchange his title of Bishop of Fargo for the high office of a cardinal; and, before we could actually begin operation of the minor seminary which is now in preparation, Cardinal Muench was called to his eternal reward... There is no monument to Cardinal Muench that could possibly be more appropriate than an institution dedicated to the work of educating priests... a work which he recognized as being so necessary in his beloved Diocese of Fargo. There is no way in which we—bishop, clergy, religious and people—can pay a finer tribute to his memory than by supporting the work in which he was so interested through prayer, through encouragement of vocations and through financial help."

Enrollment by year
Year	Pop.	±%
1962	41	—
1966	91	+122.0%
1970	36	−60.4%
1974	72	+100.0%
1978	84	+16.7%
1982	58	−31.0%
1986	45	−22.4%
1990	38	−15.6%
1994	25	−34.2%
1998	21	−16.0%
2002	9	−57.1%
2006	19	+111.1%
2011	10	−47.4%

The seminary opened with 41 students, 38 freshman and three juniors. The boys lived at the seminary building (the former convent), located on north Broadway, while attending classes at Shanley High School, which was at the time located on property adjacent to the seminary. The first graduates received diplomas from Shanley High School. By 1964, the number of seminarians had grown to 65, and the former Convent of the Sacred Heart building had become inadequate in size. Bishop Dworschak decided that a new facility was necessary, and an 80-acre property was chosen on Fargo's north side, a short distance. Construction began in 1965, and was completed in the fall of 1966, making it the largest building project the Diocese of Fargo had ever undergone. Bishop Dworschak dedicated the new building on August 22, 1966. The seminarians began the 1966–1967 academic year at the new building. A full faculty, unaffiliated with Shanley High School, was hired, and the high school program received independent accreditation. All classes were taught at the new campus and diplomas were now awarded by Cardinal Muench Seminary.

In 1966, the seminary commenced a program for college-age men. The administration reached an agreement between the seminary, North Dakota State University, and the North Dakota Board of Higher Education. Now, Cardinal Muench seminarians would matriculate to North Dakota State, and the seminary would provide philosophy, humanities, and classics instructors to the university. Beginning in 1972, the seminary began to enroll men from other dioceses in both the college and high school programs. In the years that followed, seminarians were enrolled from 12 dioceses besides the Diocese of Fargo. in that same year, the first Cardinal Muench alumnus was ordained to the priesthood.

Also in 1972, Cardinal Muench Seminary tweaked its curriculum to accommodate seminarians who had already graduated from college. That year, the seminary enrolled its first student who already had a baccalaureate degree. Given that the curriculum was designed for men who had not yet earned a college degree, seminarians who already had one were at first known as "special students." Later, the seminary developed its Pre-Theology Program for these seminarians. The program was originally one year, but when the US Conference of Catholic Bishops changed its requirements for priestly formation, it was lengthened to two years.

During the late 1980s and early 1990s, the seminary, in conjunction with the Diocese of Fargo, began increasing outreach efforts to attract seminarians. in 1989, the Rev. James Lauerman, a teacher and spiritual advisor of Cardinal Muench Seminary, designed an aptitude and interest test for middle school and high school students to contemplate a priestly vocation. In 1991, the seminary started the Vianney Discernment Program to help young men discern their vocation. The men lived in community, praying together and receiving spiritual direction. During the program's existence, 40 men participated, 15 of whom entered seminary, and as of 2013, six have been ordained priests. Despite these efforts, the high school program continued to decline in enrollment. In 1991, the high school program stopped having an independent faculty and the seminarians began attending classes at Shanley High School, as they had in the past. The last high school seminarian graduated in 2001, and the program ended.

Bishop Samuel J. Aquila became Bishop of Fargo in 2002, and despite the declining enrollment, he continued to support the seminary. Effort was made to increase the seminary's enrollment, but it was unsuccessful. On April 8, 2010, Bishop Aquila announced that Cardinal Muench Seminary would close after the next academic year. The seminary officially closed on May 13, 2011, the Feast of Our Lady of Fátima. During its 49 years of existence, 923 men participated in Cardinal Muench Seminary programs. The seminary graduated 364 men, 123 of whom have been ordained priests as of 2013.

== Notable alumni ==
- Msgr. Brian Donahue, Vicar General of the Diocese of Fargo
- Tim Mathern, North Dakota state senator; attended the Cardinal Muench high school program

== List of rectors ==
- Rev. Edward Arth (1966 - ??? ); (1978 ???)
- Rev. Valentine G. Gross (?–1990)
- Rev. Brian Donahue (1990–2002)
- Msgr. Gregory J. Schlesselmann (2002–2011)

== See also ==
- List of Roman Catholic seminaries
- List of closed Roman Catholic seminaries in the United States
