= Siegfried Reinhardt =

American artist

Siegfried Gerhard Reinhardt (July 31, 1925 in Eydkuhnen, Germany – October 24, 1984 in St. Louis, Missouri was a prolific artist and teacher, based for most of his career, 1955–1970, at Washington University in St. Louis, where he had taken his Bachelor of Arts degree in English Literature in 1950. He was also a prominent member of the St. Louis Artists Guild. He was a pioneer in combining elements of realism and surrealism in a style known sometimes as superrealism.

== Biography ==
Reinhardt was the son of Otto Frederick and Minni (Kukat) Reinhardt, emigrated with them in 1928, and was naturalized in 1936. Reinhardt enlisted in the U.S. Navy at the age of 18 on February 24, 1944. A neighbor later recollected: ”Siegfried Reinhardt served as the illustrator on the rare Shanghai edition of the Stars and Stripes, which was published aboard ship, the USS General R. M. Blatchford (AP-153), a vessel carrying 2,461 troops from the CBI-China/Burma/India campaign. The ship was returning to the States April 21-May 6, 1946 following World War II. The then 21-year-old Reinhardt's stencil sketches for the "daily" 17 issue onboard newspaper are nimbly done, and add a great deal to the morale boosting nature of this spontaneous edition of the Soldier's Newspaper.”

Although not educated as an artist, his talent drew attention from national media in the postwar years. In 1950 Life Magazine listed him among nineteen important new American artists, and followed with a feature in the March 24, 1952 issue. Time Magazine had also identified him as an important new figure (September 12, 1960):

"German-born Siegfried Reinhardt of St. Louis has had no formal art training, but by the time he was eleven was intent on becoming a painter. A big (6 ft. 2 in.) and muscular 35, he went through an abstract phase ("esthetic nonsense," he calls it now), has since developed a wholly figurative style, which he boasts is "un-new, un-experi-mental" and "un-angry." His main subject now, he says, is humanity, seen as the eternal lonely crowd—a torrent of faces and figures that gush out of "strange architectural settings that are unrelated to any recognizable place in the world."

From 1949 to 1984 he worked with the St. Louis stained glass artisan Emil Frei in the design of windows, including the (1960) Easter Window in the Lutheran Church of the Resurrection, in Sunset Hills, Missouri, of which Reinhardt said:

"The 'flame' symbolizes the Holy Spirit as it descended in tongues of fire over the heads of the disciples in the miracle of the upper room in the presence of the Lord Jesus Christ.

It also symbolizes, by contrast, the descent of Christ into hell, as well as His resurrection. It further represents the eternal presence of the Spirit of God in the dynamics of life lived to the glory of the Supreme Creator.

The architectural triangle in which the flame is placed in the stained glass resolution is the triangle of the Holy Trinity--Father (God), Son (Jesus) and Holy Spirit (dove with the flame above its head.)" In the center of the flames is a Chi Rho (Greek abbreviation for Jesus Christ). In the lower right appears a fish, an early symbol of Jesus' resurrection and an identifying symbol of early believers of Christ. The dove (Holy Spirit) is in the upper left of the window. Suspended in one of the window frames on the left is the sanctuary lamp holding an ever-burning candle, a symbol of the ever-presence of God in His church."

Reinhardt, a Lutheran, often worked with Christian motifs and themes. He also did numerous figure studies, often using his wife, the sculptor Harriet Fleming Reinhardt (married April 25, 1948), as a model. His 1955 commission for Monsanto Company, "Mistress of Chemistry," portrays Harriet in that role invoking traditional depictions of the Madonna. His 1953 "Crucifixion" receives extended discussion (pp. 83–84) in Robert Henkes' "The Crucifixion in American Art" (McFarland P, 2003). The Brauer Museum at Valparaiso University has three religious works in its permanent collection: "Resurrection," "Design for a Crown," and "Caiaphas."

In the late 1950s, he produced the painting “Man of Sorrows” in a series of seven installments on local public television station KETC, explaining his decisions and techniques to viewers as he went.

From 1955 through 1970, Reinhardt taught at the St. Louis School of Fine Arts at Washington University. Reinhardt also served as artist in residence at Southern Illinois University in Carbondale from 1950 to 1954 then again from 1968 to 1969, and St. Louis Community College Meramec (Kirkwood) from 1971 through his death. His works have sold for up to $25,500.00 (as in the case of "Woman with Cross", painted in 1947).

Additional works are housed at the Smithsonian American Art Museum, the Nelson-Atkins Museum of Art, the Saint Louis Art Museum, the Vatican Museum Picture Gallery, and the Whitney Museum of American Art.

Reinhardt died of an apparent heart attack at the age of 59, according to his obituary in the New York Times.

== Work ==
Works on public display include:

- His best-known work is perhaps the series of murals he executed at Lambert International Airport illustrating the history of aviation.
- a mural portraying the history of Vernon County, Missouri, in the Nevada, Missouri City Council Chambers, Ash Street at Austin Boulevard (U.S. 54 Highway). This mural, painted in 1975, is a three-panel depiction of Vernon County history;
- The Te Deum mosaic at the Walther Library at Concordia Senior College, Indiana;
- The "Gateway to the West" mosaic at the Visitor Center to the Gateway Arch in St. Louis.
- On the grounds of the Cathedral of Saint Joseph in Jefferson City, Missouri, a depiction of St. Francis and the animals.
- "The Story of Money" above the teller counter at the Bank of America building on Lindell Avenue in St. Louis's Central West End.

== Sources ==
Who Was Who in American Art. Compiled from the original thirty-four volumes of American Art Annual: Who's Who in Art, Biographies of American Artists Active from 1898 to 1947. Edited by Peter Hastings Falk. Madison, CT: Sound View Press, 1985.
