= Barbara Blaine =

American lawyer, founded sexual abuse victims group SNAP (1956–2017)

- Born: July 6, 1956; Toledo, Ohio
- Died: September 24, 2017 (aged 61); St. George, Utah
- Occupations: Attorney and Child Advocate
- Known for: Founder and president of Survivors Network of those Abused by Priests

Barbara Ann Blaine (July 6, 1956 – September 24, 2017) was the founder in 1988 and president until February 2017 of Survivors Network of those Abused by Priests (SNAP), a national advocacy group in the United States for survivors of clerical sexual abuse. It has been involved in the efforts by survivors to gain compensation and action by the Catholic Church and other religious organizations to end clergy abuse and acknowledge past cover-ups.

Based in Chicago, Illinois, until its 2016 relocation to St. Louis, SNAP expanded to having chapters in numerous US cities, as well as organizations in other countries. In 2017 its website said it had 20,000 members.

== Life ==
Blaine was born on July 6, 1956, to a Catholic family in Toledo, Ohio. She earned a bachelor's degree from Saint Louis University, a master's degree in social work from the Brown School at Washington University in St. Louis, and a Juris Doctor degree from DePaul University College of Law. She later resided and worked in Chicago.

Blaine worked as a lay missionary in Jamaica before moving to Chicago's Edgewater neighborhood in 1983 to take a job with Pax Christi, an international Catholic peace movement. For a decade, she worked with the Catholic Worker, a social service agency. Blaine also opened a homeless facility in a former convent at the now-shuttered Little Flower Catholic Church on the South Side. In 2002 she also worked as an assistant Cook County public guardian under Patrick Murphy.

In the late 1980s Blaine was coming to terms with having been sexually abused as a teenager by a priest. More reporting was being done about other abuse victims, as some refused to keep quiet about their treatment in the church and efforts to suppress information through settlements.

In 1988 Blaine founded Survivors Network of those Abused by Priests (SNAP), an organization to support those who had been abused by priests. She served as founding president until February 2017. Based in Chicago, SNAP has since enlarged its support to victims of other clergy, and there are sub-groups related to specific religious cultures.

Blaine said in 1989 that she had struggled herself to deal with having been abused for several years as a young teenager, beginning in junior high.

In August 2016, SNAP moved the home office from Chicago to St. Louis and Blaine began negotiations for her departure form SNAP. Blaine resigned from SNAP effective February 3, 2017, and started a new international organization, The Accountability Project (TAP) with a goal to end sexual abuse in the Catholic Church by putting together activists from all parts of the world to confront the Pope and the Vatican.

In August 2017, an organizing meeting with representatives from several nations took place in Washington, D.C. TAP's first meeting with 12 countries represented was planned for Poland in November 2017 when Blaine suddenly died in September. TAP's mission has continued under the name Ending Clergy Abuse (ECA) and it held the Poland meeting.

A former staffer, Gretchen Rachel Hammond, filed a civil suit against SNAP in January 2017 regarding her alleged termination in February 2013. Hammond accused SNAP of retaliatory discharge. SNAP and Blaine denied the allegations. On August 29, 2017, the court dismissed two of the three counts in the Complaint. The complaint that remained had 24 paragraphs stricken and settled. ("Gretchen Rachel Hammond v. Survivors Network of Those Abused by Priests", Circuit Court of Cook County, Illinois, 2017 L 558)

== Death ==
Blaine died on September 24, 2017, while vacationing in St. George, Utah, where she was surrounded by family and friends. The cause of death was a condition resulting from a sudden tear in a blood vessel in her heart.

== See also ==
- David Clohessy, Executive director and spokesperson for SNAP
