= Joseph M. Marling =

American prelate

His Excellency, The Most Reverend Joseph Mary Marling C.PP.S
- Bishop of Jefferson City; Titular Bishop of Thasus; Titular Bishop of Lesina
- Church: Roman Catholic Church
- See: Diocese of Jefferson City
- In office: 1956 to 1969
- Successor: Michael Francis McAuliffe
- Previous posts: Auxiliary Bishop of Kansas City (1947 to 1956); Titular Bishop of Thasus

Orders
- Ordination: February 21, 1929 by John T. McNicholas
- Consecration: August 6, 1947 by Edwin Vincent O'Hara

Personal details
- Born: August 31, 1904 Centralia, West Virginia, US
- Died: October 2, 1979 (aged 75) Kansas City, Missouri, US
- Motto: Per sanguinem crucis (Through the blood of the cross)

Styles of Joseph Marling
- Reference style: The Most Reverend
- Spoken style: Your Excellency
- Religious style: Monsignor
- Posthumous style: none

Joseph Mary Marling, C.PP.S (August 31, 1904 – October 2, 1979) was an American Catholic prelate who served as the first bishop of Jefferson City in Missouri from 1956 to 1969. He was a member of the Missionaries of the Precious Blood.

Marling previously served as an auxiliary bishop of the Diocese of Kansas City in Missouri from 1947 to 1956 and as the superior of the American province of his religious community.

== Biography ==
Joseph Marling was born on August 31, 1904, in Centralia, West Virginia. He was ordained as priest of the Missionaries of Precious Blood by Archbishop John McNicholas in Carthagena, Ohio, on February 21, 1929.

After teaching philosophy at the Catholic University of America in Washington, D.C. and conducting pastoral work, Marling was elected provincial director of the Society's American province in 1938. During his tenure as director, Marling provided funds for Saint Joseph's College in Rensselaer, Indiana, to build four new buildings. He also sent priests there to serve as graduate faculty. In 1931, Marling opened the Brunnerdale Minor Seminary, a school for preparing teenage boys for the priesthood in Canton, Ohio.

After the end of World War II in 1945, Marling supervised shipments of food from the Missionaries to Austria and West Germany.

=== Auxiliary Bishop of Kansas City ===
On June 7, 1947, Marling was appointed auxiliary bishop of Kansas City, Missouri, and titular bishop of Thasus by Pope Pius XII. He received his episcopal consecration on August 6, 1947, from Archbishop Edwin O'Hara, with Bishops Joseph Albers and John Bennett serving as co-consecrators, at St. Monica Church in Cincinnati, Ohio. Marling chose as his episcopal motto, Per Sanguinem Crucis, meaning “Through the Blood of the Cross."

In a 1956 address to the Guild of Catholic Psychiatrists, Marling suggested that psychiatrists should pay attention to "...mystical phenomena (ecstasy, levitation, visions, stigmatization), vocations to the priesthood and religious life".

=== Bishop of Jefferson City ===
Marling was named the first bishop of Jefferson City on August 24, 1956, by Pius XII. During his tenure, Marling oversaw the construction of a new cathedral, twenty-five churches, twenty-nine schools, thirty rectories, sixteen convents, and a Carmelite monastery. Marling also established the Catholic Missourian, the diocesan newspaper, and missions in Peru. He attended the Second Vatican Council from 1962 to 1965.

=== Retirement and legacy ===
On July 2, 1969, Pope Paul VI accepted Marling's resignation as bishop of Jefferson City and appointed him as titular bishop of Lesina, a post which he gave up on January 16, 1976.

Marling died in Kansas City, Missouri, on October 2, 1979, at age 75. His remains were interred in the Precious Blood Community Cemetery at St. Charles Seminary in Carthagena.

Catholic Church titles
Preceded by none	Bishop of Jefferson City; 1956–1969	Succeeded by Michael Francis McAuliffe
Preceded by –	Auxiliary Bishop of Kansas City; 1947–1956	Succeeded by –
