= Michael Francis McAuliffe =

American prelate

His Excellency, The Most Reverend Michael Francis McAuliffe
- Bishop of Jefferson City
- Church: Roman Catholic Church
- See: Diocese of Jefferson City
- Predecessor: Joseph M. Marling
- Successor: John R. Gaydos

Orders
- Ordination: May 31, 1945 by Lorenzo Del Ponte
- Consecration: August 18, 1969 by Luigi Raimondi

Personal details
- Born: November 22, 1920 Kansas City, Kansas, US
- Died: January 9, 2006 (aged 85) Kansas City, Missouri, US
- Education: St. Louis Preparatory Seminary; Catholic University of America
- Motto: In truth and charity

Styles of Michael F. McAuliffe
- Reference style: The Most Reverend
- Spoken style: Your Excellency
- Religious style: Monsignor

Michael Francis McAuliffe (November 22, 1920 - January 9, 2006) was an American prelate of the Roman Catholic Church. He served as the second bishop of the Diocese of Jefferson City in Missouri.

== Biography ==
=== Early life ===
Michael McAuliffe was born on November 22, 1920, in Kansas City, Missouri, the second of six sons of John Joseph McAuliffe and Bridget Agnes (Broderick) McAuliffe.

McAuliffe attended Our Lady of Good Counsel School and St. John High School Seminary, both in Kansas City. McAuliffe then went to the St. Louis Preparatory Seminary in St. Louis, Missouri, and finally the Theological College of Catholic University of America in Washington, D.C.

McAuliffe was ordained a priest by Bishop Lorenzo Del Ponte at the Cathedral of the Immaculate Conception in Kansas City, Missouri, for the Diocese of Kansas City on May 31, 1945.

=== Bishop of Jefferson City ===
Upon the resignation of Bishop Joseph M. Marling, Pope Paul VI appointed McAuliffe as the second bishop of Jefferson City on July 2, 1969. McAuliffe was consecrated and installed by Cardinal Luigi Raimondi on August 18, 1969, at the Cathedral of Saint Joseph in Jefferson City, Missouri. McAuliffe's motto was "In Truth and Charity."

In January 1980, McAuliffe appeared before the Missouri General Assembly to support the passage of the Equal Rights Amendment to the US Constitution.

In June 1982, Holy Family Parish in New Haven, Missouri, won a court battle with McAuliffe about the relocation of an ornate marble altar within the church sanctuary. McAuliffe had stated that the guidelines of the Second Vatican Council forced him to relocate the altar. The judge enjoined McAuliffe and Holy Family to negotiate a compromise solution.

=== Retirement and legacy ===
On June 25, 1997, Pope John Paul II accepted McAuliffe's resignation as bishop of Jefferson City. In February 2003, McAuliffe and the diocese were sued by a North Carolina man who claimed to have been sexually molested by two diocesan priests when he was a child.

Michael McAuliffe died in Kansas City, Missouri, on January 9, 2006. He is buried at Resurrection Cemetery in Jefferson City.

Catholic Church titles
Preceded by Joseph M. Marling	Bishop of Jefferson City; 1969 to 1997	Succeeded by John R. Gaydos
