= David Clohessy =

American activist and leader for victims of clergy abuse

- Born: David G. Clohessy c. 1956
- Education: Drury University
- Occupation: Activist
- Known for: Former Executive Director and spokesman for the Survivors Network of those Abused by Priests (SNAP)

David G. Clohessy (born c. 1956) is known as an American activist and leader for victims of clergy abuse. He served for more than two decades, until December 2017, as the executive director and spokesman for the Survivor's Network of those Abused by Priests (SNAP). He remained on the board after his resignation.

Based in Chicago, SNAP is the largest and oldest national self-help group for victims of clergy molestation in the United States.

== Biography ==
Clohessy was reared as a Catholic. His brother Kevin became a priest. After lower school, Clohessy studied at and graduated in 1978 from Drury University in Springfield, Missouri.

After college, he began work as a union organizer for the Association of Community Organizations for Reform Now (ACORN). He has also worked as a public relations director. He has been based in St. Louis, Missouri. His work included serving on the staff of St. Louis Mayor Freeman Bosley Jr.

=== Sexual abuse by clergy ===
Clohessy has said that he was the victim of sexual abuse as a teenager (from 1969–1973) by priest Fr. John J. Whiteley, in the Roman Catholic Diocese of Jefferson City.

He began to work on this issue as an activist in the late 1980s, when other victims of clergy abuse began to speak out. In 1989 Survivor's Network of those Abused by Priests (SNAP) was founded by Barbara Blaine.

Clohessy was one of four abuse survivors to speak to the full US Conference of Catholic Bishops at its June 2002 meeting in Dallas, which attracted thousands of journalists and at which the US church's first nationwide policy on child sexual abuse was adopted.

Since his years of adult activism against clergy abuse, Clohessy has struggled with the fact that in 2002 his brother, Father Kevin Clohessy, had "a credible accusation" against him for being inappropriate sexually while a priest. His brother has since voluntarily left the priesthood. The allegation was never proven. In 2019, the Diocese of Jefferson City listed Kevin Clohessy among its list of 'credibly accused' clerics on its website, part of a national effort by the Catholic Church to be more transparent about the abuses.

In 2012, it was reported that Clohessy has faced legal trouble for failing to release information on alleged clergy abuse victims. A court order had mandated him to release the records.The information was originally requested by the court in an effort to trace the possible violation of a gag order in a sexual abuse case. After Clohessy was deposed, the Missouri State Supreme Court refused to intervene in the case. Clohessy described this court order as the most significant legal challenge faced by SNAP in its 23 years.

== See also ==
- Barbara Blaine, founder of SNAP (Survivors Network for those Abused by Priests)
