= Centralia, West Virginia =

Unincorporated community in West Virginia, United States

Centralia
- Unincorporated community
- Location within the state of West Virginia Centralia (the United States)
- Coordinates: 38°37′23″N 80°34′4″W
- Country: United States
- State: West Virginia
- County: Braxton
- Time zone: UTC-5 (Eastern (EST))
  - Summer (DST): UTC-4 (EDT)
- ZIP codes: 26601

Centralia is an unincorporated community in Braxton County, West Virginia, United States. It was so named because it is in the central part of a county which also happens to be at the geographic center of the state. Its ZIP code is 26601.
