= Ralph Bernard O'Donnell =

American Catholic prelate (born 1969)

His Excellency, The Most Reverend Ralph Bernard O'Donnell
- Bishop of Jefferson City
- Diocese: Jefferson City
- Appointed: August 19, 2025
- Installed: October 28, 2025
- Predecessor: William Shawn McKnight

Orders
- Ordination: June 7, 1997 by Elden Francis Curtiss
- Consecration: October 28, 2025 by Mitchell T. Rozanski, William Shawn McKnight, and Michael George McGovern

Personal details
- Born: August 31, 1969 (age 57) Omaha, Nebraska, US
- Motto: Servite Domino in laetitia (Latin for 'Serve the Lord with joy')
- Styles
- Reference style: His Excellency; The Most Reverend
- Spoken style: Your Excellency
- Religious style: Bishop

Ralph Bernard O'Donnell (born August 31, 1969) is an American Catholic prelate serving as Bishop of Jefferson City since 2025.

== Biography ==
=== Early life ===
O'Donnell was born on August 31, 1969, in Omaha, Nebraska. He entered Conception Seminary College in Conception, Missouri, in 1989. After receiving a Bachelor of Arts degree in religion in 1993, he continued his studies at the Mundelein Seminary in Illinois. O'Donnell was awarded a Master of Divinity degree in 1997.

=== Priesthood ===
On June 7, 1997, O'Donnell was ordained to the priesthood for the Archdiocese of Omaha at Saint Cecilia Cathedral in Omaha by Archbishop Elden Francis Curtiss. After his ordination, the archdiocese assigned O'Donnell as associate pastor at Mary Our Queen Parish in Omaha. He was transferred in 2001 to St. Vincent de Paul Parish in Omaha.

O'Donnell left St. Vincent in 2003 to serve as director of vocations for the archdiocese. he was named pastor of St. Brigid and St. Rose Parishes in Omaha in 2008, along with director of the permanent diaconate program. The archdiocese named O'Donnell as vice rector and dean or formation at Conception Seminary College in 2011. He left Conception in 2015 to serve in Washington, D.C. as executive director for the Secretariat for Clergy, Consecrated Life and Vocations at the U.S. Conference of Catholic Bishops (USCCB). O'Donnell returned to Omaha in 2019 with his appointment as pastor of St. Margaret Mary Parish.

=== Bishop of Jefferson City ===
Pope Leo XIV appointed O'Donnell as bishop of Jefferson City on August 19, 2025. On October 28, 2025, O'Donnell was consecrated as a bishop.

== See also ==
- List of Catholic bishops of the United States

== Episcopal succession ==
Catholic Church titles
Preceded by William Shawn McKnight	Bishop of Jefferson City; 2025-Present	Succeeded by Incumbent
