= Tolentine College =

Former Catholic seminary and college in Illinois

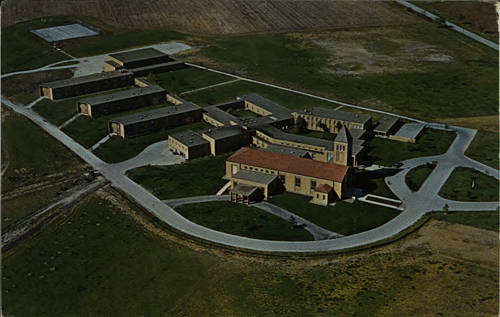
- An aerial view of Tolentine College c. 1965
- Type: Catholic seminary; Private university
- Established: 1958
- Parent institution: Order of Saint Augustine
- Location: 20300 Governors Highway, Olympia Fields, Illinois, United States; 41°31′9″N 87°42′24″W
- Campus: 122 acres (49 ha); Suburban

Tolentine College was a Catholic seminary and college operated by the Order of Saint Augustine in Olympia Fields, Illinois, United States, from 1958 until 1974. Following the closure of the college, the campus served as the home of the Tolentine Center, as well as an administrative headquarters for the Midwestern province of the Augustinians. Beginning in 1985 it also housed the Mercy Residence at Tolentine, a senior living facility. By the 2000s the property was listed for sale, and was later acquired by All Nations Assembly Church. In 2020 a proposal was made to use the facility for inpatient drug and alcohol treatment, but that proposal was dropped due to opposition from residents in the area.

== Tolentine College ==
=== Founding ===
In 1958, the Augustinian Province of Our Mother of Good Counsel, which covers much of the Midwestern United States, opened a seminary for college students of the Augustinian Order in Olympia Fields, Illinois. The college, built on a 112-acre site, was named after Nicholas of Tolentino, the first Augustinian to be canonized by the Catholic Church, and would primarily serve recent graduates of St. Augustine Seminary High School. By 1960, the Augustinian province had transferred its graduate theology division from Conception Seminary College in Conception, Missouri to Olympia Fields. In 1961, the seminary chapel was completed, with the Mass of Dedication being offered by Petrus Canisius van Lierde, the Vicar General of the Vatican; there were 55 students enrolled at Tolentine at this time.

By 1968, the theology division at Tolentine was closed and its students sent to the Catholic Theological Union in Chicago, making Tolentine an undergraduate college. That same year, the college program was opened to both male and female lay students from the area, offering a liberal arts education. Only one female student, Becky Branacky, enrolled in the first year of gender integration. Augustinian seminarians were about half of the student body that year. In 1969 the North Central Association of Colleges and Schools accredited the institution as a four-year liberal arts college.

=== Closure ===
Enrollment in both the seminary and collegiate divisions continued to decline, in part due to the opening of the Catholic Theological Union, and in 1973 Tolentine's remaining college seminarians were transferred to Villanova University. The closure of the college was announced that same year, with administrators citing financial issues. Around 100 students were enrolled in the school at the time of its closure. Robert Prevost, later Pope Leo XIV, along with many of his classmates from St. Augustine Seminary, had intended to attend Tolentine beginning in 1974; most of them went to Villanova instead. The Augustinians' Midwestern province headquarters were moved onto the site, which became known as the Tolentine Center.

== Tolentine Center and Mercy Residence at Tolentine ==
The Tolentine Center offered continuing education courses in theology, economics, and arts and crafts, focusing on "spiritual renewal, innovative education, and the arts". It also hosted a variety of retreats, including for those involved in church music ministry, those interested in the Catholic Charismatic Renewal, and married couples. However, interest in the Tolentine Center's retreat offerings eventually declined and the center closed in 1981. In 1985, part of the seminary's dormitories were converted into the Mercy Residence at Tolentine, a joint venture between the Augustinians and the Sisters of Mercy serving elderly community members. By 1988, 52 senior citizens resided on the property.

== Sale and later use ==
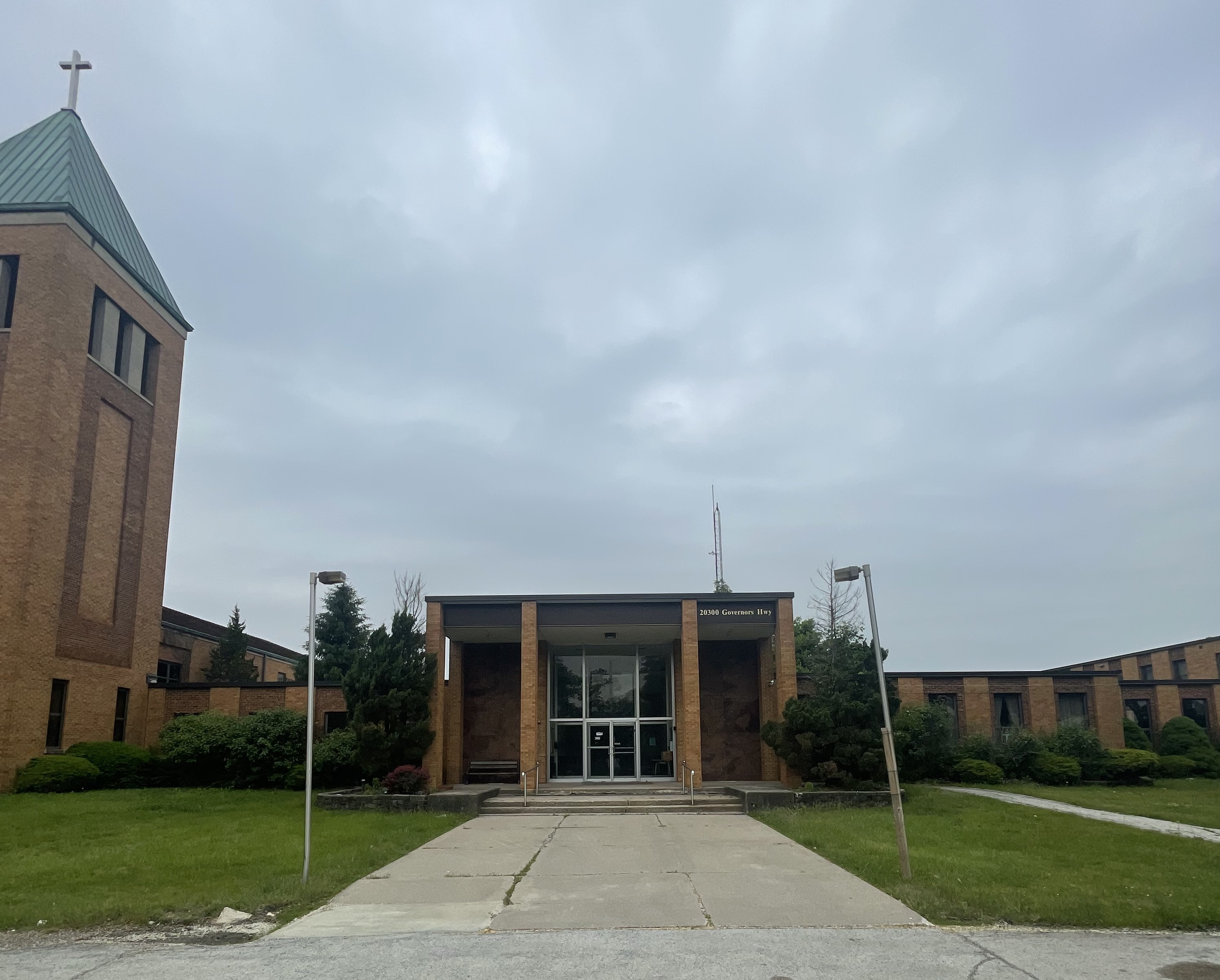
The former Tolentine College campus in 2025

In 2004, 85 of the 102 acres owned by the Augustinians were listed for sale, in part to raise money for asbestos abatement and the razing of unneeded buildings. Propositions were made to use part of the property for recreational trails, basketball courts, and a community garden. The campus continued to be utilized by the Augustinians until around 2009, and later was acquired by All Nations Assembly Church. In 2020, a residential addiction treatment facility was proposed as a use for the former monastery but local resistance prevented the initiative from moving forward.
