= Diocese of Jefferson City =

Latin Catholic jurisdiction in the US

Coordinates: 38°35′30″N 92°12′32″W

Diocese of Jefferson City Dioecesis Civitatis Jeffersoniensis
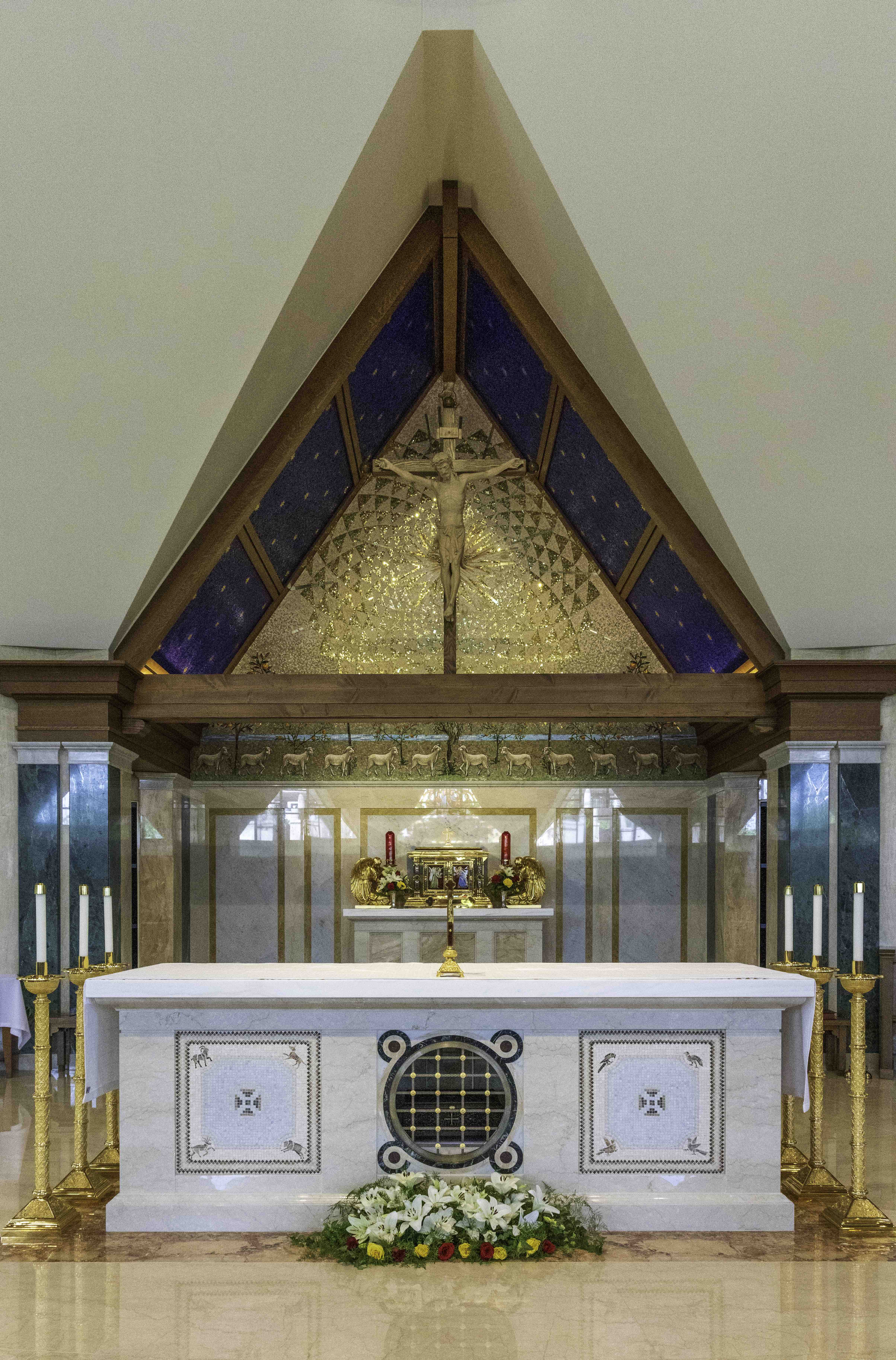
- Cathedral of Saint Joseph

- Coat of arms

Location
- Country: United States
- Territory: 38 counties across central and northeastern Missouri
- Ecclesiastical province: St. Louis
- Headquarters: Jefferson City, MO

Statistics
- Area: 22,127 sq mi (57,310 km^{2})
- Population: Total; Catholics: (as of 2023); 925,262 ▲; 74,757 ▼ (8.1%)
- Parishes: 92 ▼

Information
- Denomination: Catholic
- Sui iuris church: Latin Church
- Rite: Roman Rite
- Established: July 2, 1956 (70 years ago)
- Cathedral: Cathedral of Saint Joseph
- Patron saint: Immaculate Heart of Mary
- Secular priests: 98 ▲93 Permanent Deacons

Current leadership
- Pope: Leo XIV
- Bishop: Ralph Bernard O'Donnell
- Metropolitan Archbishop: Mitchell T. Rozanski

Map
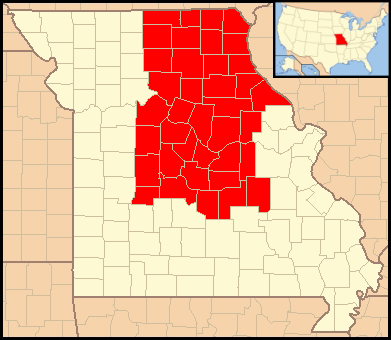
- The 38 counties in the Diocese of Jefferson City

Website
- diojeffcity.org

The Diocese of Jefferson City (Latin: Dioecesis Civitatis Jeffersoniensis) is a diocese of the Catholic Church in the state of Missouri in the United States. It is a suffragan diocese of the metropolitan Archdiocese of St. Louis. The mother church is the Cathedral of Saint Joseph in Jefferson City. The bishop is Ralph O'Donnell.

== Statistics ==
As of 2023, the Diocese of Jefferson City had 93 parishes and nine missions. The diocese had 77 active diocesan priests, 18 priests from other dioceses, 27 nuns and 101 permanent deacons. The Catholic population was over 76,200.

The diocese consists of 38 counties in mainly rural northeastern and central Missouri, and includes the urban areas of Columbia and Jefferson City.

== History ==
=== 1600 to 1800 ===
The first Catholic presence in present-day Missouri was that of the Jesuit missionary Jacques Marquette in 1673, who stopped in Perry County while voyaging down the Mississippi River. In present-day Hannibal, the first Catholic masses were celebrated by the Belgian missionary, Louis Hennepin, in 1680. During this period, the few Catholics in the region were under the jurisdiction of the Diocese of San Cristobal de la Habana, based in Havana, Cuba.

French-Canadian settlers established St. Genevieve, the first parish in the diocese, in 1759 in Ste. Genevieve. With the end of the French and Indian War in 1763, Spain took control of the French territories west of the Mississippi River. In 1793, after the American Revolution, Pope Pius VI erected the Diocese of Louisiana and the Two Floridas, based in New Orleans. It encompassed all the Spanish territories on the continent, including the Missouri area. Due to politics in Europe, the new diocese did not receive a bishop until 1815.

=== 1800 to 1900 ===
In 1803, with the signing of the Louisiana Purchase, the United States took control from France of a vast area of the continent, including Missouri. Pope Pius VII in 1815 named Louis Dubourg as the first bishop of the Louisiana and the Two Floridas. Due to concerns about his personal safety in New Orleans, DuBourg chose the City of St. Louis as his episcopal see.

On July 18, 1826, Pope Leo XII divided up the Diocese of Louisiana and the Two Floridas. One of the new dioceses was the Diocese of St. Louis, which included Missouri along with vast areas of the American Midwest and Great Plains Because of its size, the diocese was often referred to as the Rome of the West. The Jefferson City region would remain part of this diocese and others for the next 130 years.

The first German-language parish west of the Mississippi River, St. Joseph was founded in Westphalia, Missouri, in 1835. In Jefferson City, St. Peter's, the first Catholic church in that city, was dedicated in 1846. St. Patrick's Parish was founded in 1862 in Rolla, Missouri, to minister to the Irish Catholic railroad workers there.

=== 1900 to present ===
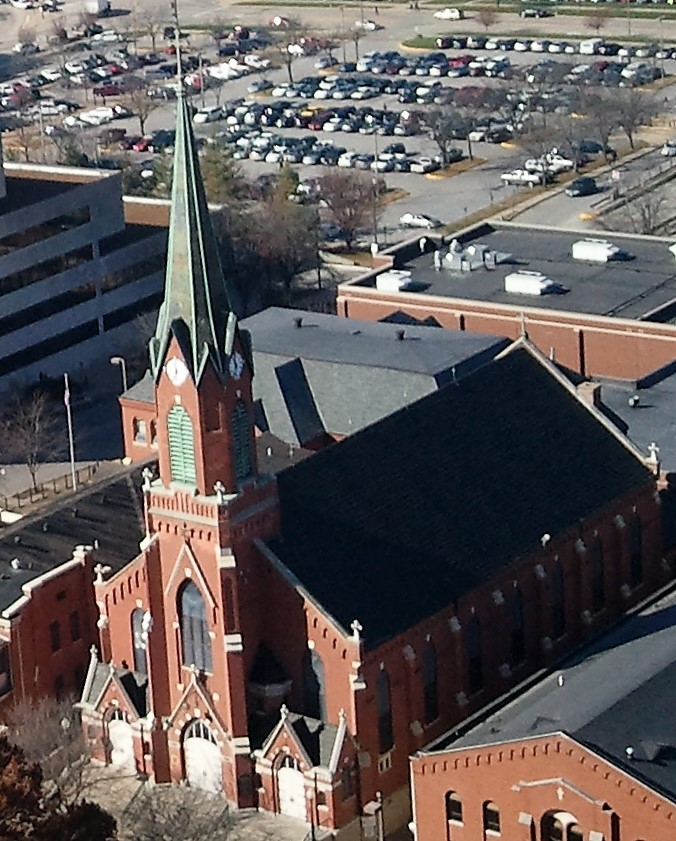
St. Peter's Church, Jefferson City, Missouri, was the first diocesan cathedral. (2012)

On July 2, 1956, Pope Pius XII established the Diocese of Jefferson City. Its territory was taken from the Archdiocese of St. Louis, the Diocese of Kansas City and the Diocese of Saint Joseph. The pope named Auxiliary Bishop Joseph M. Marling of Kansas City as the first bishop of the new diocese.

During his tenure, Marling oversaw the construction of a new cathedral, 25 churches, 29 schools, 30 rectories, 16 convents, and a Carmelite monastery. He also established the diocesan newspaper and missions in Peru. Marling retired in 1969.

Michael McAuliffe was the second bishop of Jefferson City, taking office in 1969. In 1980, McAuliffe appeared before the Missouri General Assembly to support the passage of the Equal Rights Amendment to the US Constitution. He retired in 1997.John R. Gaydos replaced him the same year. Gaydos retired early in 2017 due to poor health. Shawn McKnight served as the next bishop.

In November 2024, Bishop McKnight banned the use of several popular hymns, including “All Are Welcome” by composer Marty Haugen. After pushback from the Catholic community, the diocese replaced the original ban with a directive emphasizing synodal consultation on liturgical music.

Ralph O'Donnell was named bishop on August 19, 2025.

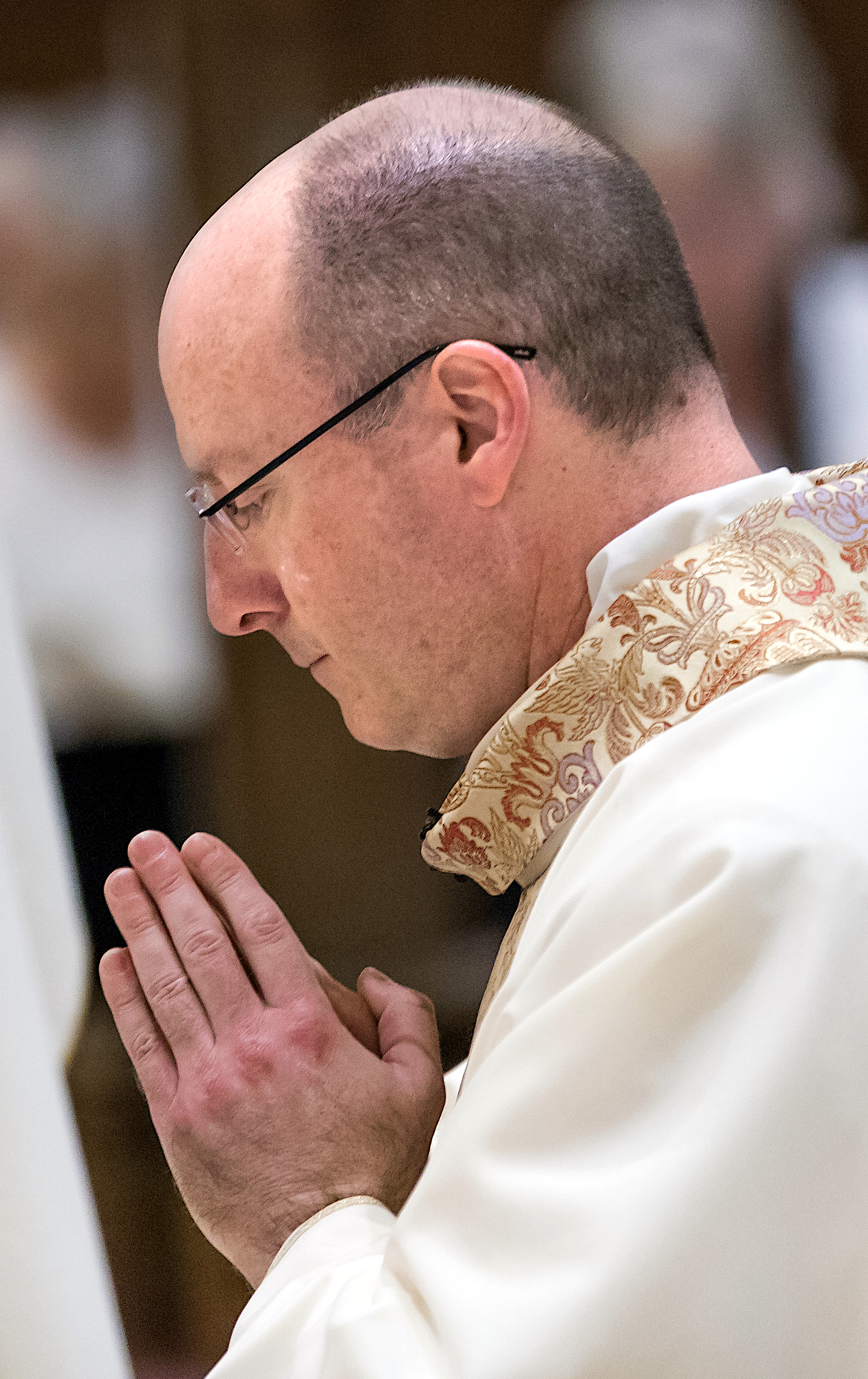
Bishop McKnight in 2018

=== Sex abuse ===
In 2002, a new report revealed that the Diocese of Jefferson City paid a secret financial settlement of $125,000 in 1996 to Christopher Dixon. A former seminarian, Dixon claimed to have been sexually abused by O'Connell in 1969 at the seminary. In 2002, O'Connell admitted abusing two boys at the seminary and resigned as bishop of Palm Beach. In May 2002, facing declining enrollment at Thomas Aquinas Seminary and pending more sexual abuse lawsuits, Gaydos closed the seminary.

In 2015, the diocese settled for $40,000 a long-standing sexual abuse claim by David Clohessy against John Whiteley, a diocese priest. Clohessy had sued the diocese in 1991, claiming that Whitely, then a pastor at St. Pius X Parish in Moberly, had sexually abused him. Clohessy's case was dismissed in 1993 due to the Missouri statute of limitations. Clohessy renewed his claim in 2015 and the diocese decided that it was credible.

Bishop McKnight announced in 2020 that two diocesan priests, Robert Duesdieker and Mel Lahr, had been laicized due to credible accusations of sexual abuse of children. In January 2022, the diocese released a list of clergy accused of violating the Charter for The Protection of Children and Young People issued by the US Conference of Catholic Bishops.

In November 2023, the diocese barred Ignazio Medina from celebrating mass or hearing confessions. An adult had accused Medina of sexually soliciting them during confession in 2022. In July 2024, Medina pleaded guilty in court to stealing over $300,000 from St. Stanislaus Parish in Wardsville from 2013 to 2021.

== Bishops ==
=== Bishops of Jefferson City ===
1. Joseph M. Marling, C.PP.S. (1956-1969)
2. Michael Francis McAuliffe (1969-1997)
3. John R. Gaydos (1997-2017)
4. Shawn McKnight (2018–2025)
5. Ralph Bernard O'Donnell (2025-present)

=== Other diocesan priest who became bishop ===
Anthony Joseph O'Connell, appointed Bishop of Knoxville in 1988, later Bishop of Palm Beach, resigned as bishop of Palm Beach due to his admission of sexual abuse.

== Education ==
The Diocese of Jefferson, as of 2023, had three high schools and 37 elementary schools, with a total student enrollment of approximately 6, 700. The high schools are:

- Helias Catholic High School – Jefferson City
- Sacred Heart High School – Sedalia
- Father Tolton Regional Catholic High School – Columbia

== Newspaper ==
"The Catholic Missourian" is the official newspaper of the diocese.

== Alphonse J. Schwartze Memorial Catholic Center ==
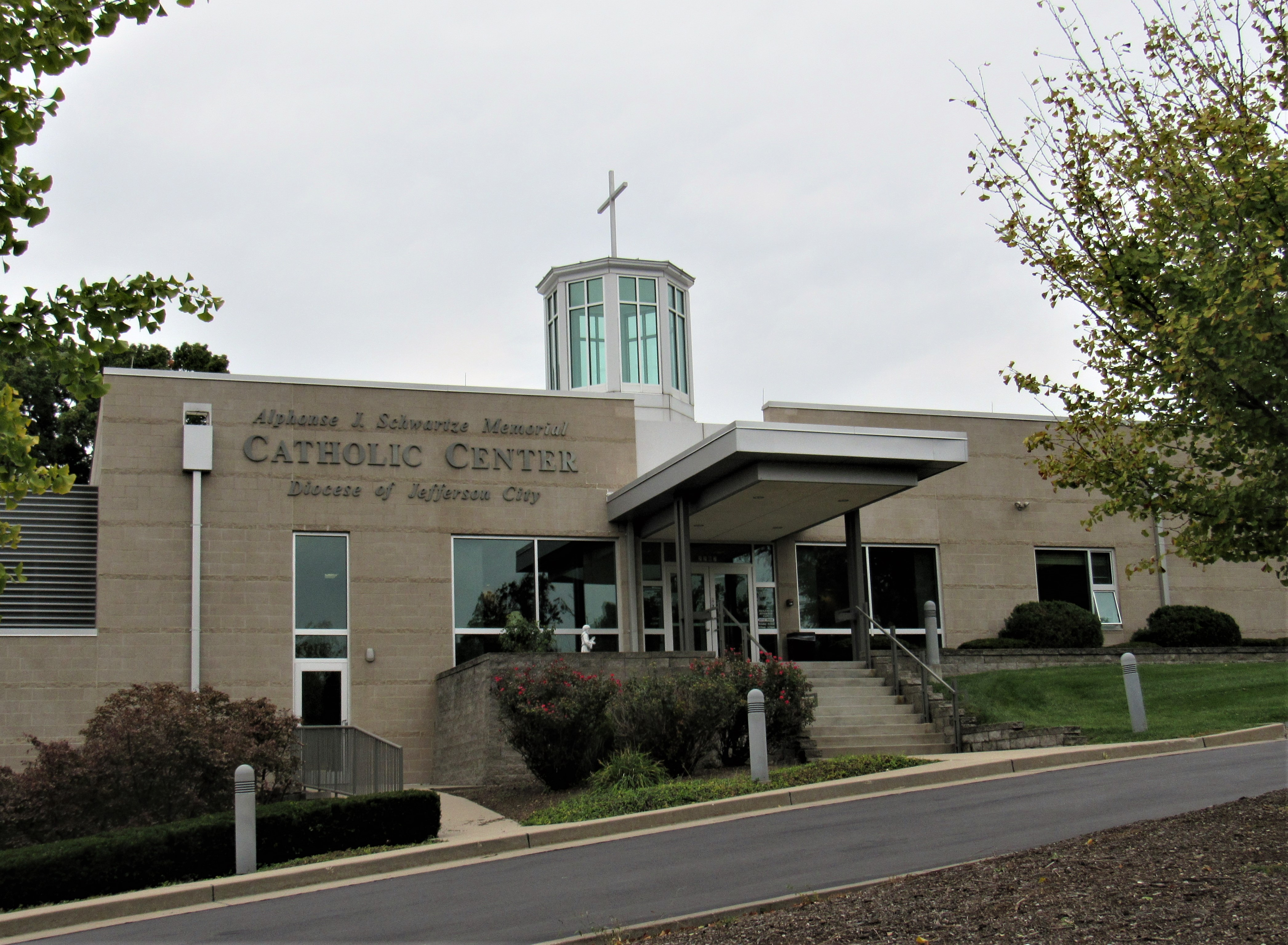
Alphonse J. Schwartze Memorial Catholic Center (2019)

The Alphonse J. Schwartze Memorial Catholic Center serves as the chancery offices for the Diocese of Jefferson City. Located adjacent to the Cathedral of Saint Joseph, it is the pastoral center and a headquarters for the diocese. The center is named for Alphonse J. Schwartze, a parishioner of St. Joseph's Church in Westphalia. Groundbreaking for the center took place in 2004.

== Sources ==
- Rice, C. David (1999). "DuBourg, Louis William (1766–1833)". In Christensen, Lawrence O.; Foley, William E.; Kremer, Gary R.; Winn, Kenneth H. (eds.). Dictionary of Missouri Biography. Columbia, MO: University of Missouri Press. pp. 258–259. ISBN 0-8262-1222-0. Archived from the original on 23 December 2020 – via Google Books.
