= Brunnerdale Minor Seminary =

Coordinates: 40°50′36″N 81°28′04″W

Brunnerdale Minor Seminary was a Catholic minor seminary for the Missionaries of the Precious Blood from 1931 to 1981. The school was devoted to preparing young men for the priesthood. Located in Canton, Ohio, the building and grounds were sold in 1989 and are now the Glenmoor Country Club.

Between 1931 and 1948, students attended Brunnerdale for as many as three years and then completed high school at Saint Joseph's College, Collegeville, Indiana. Brunnerdale became a four year high school seminary in 1949, graduating its first class that same year.

In later years, Brunnerdale added a Brother Candidate Program for those interested in becoming a religious brother in their congregation. Brunnerdale was also the minor seminary of the Trinity Missions from 1973 to 1977. Later referred to as Brunnerdale High School Seminary, the final class to graduate was in 1981.

Records indicate that 3,022 students attended Brunnerdale Seminary. Of this total of 3,022, 1416 students entered Brunnerdale from 1931 to 1956. The additional 1,606 students entered Brunnerdale from 1957 to 1981.
