= Deaths in October 2025 =

The following is a list of notable deaths in October 2025.

Entries for each day are listed alphabetically by surname. A typical entry lists information in the following sequence:

- Name, age, country of citizenship at birth, subsequent country of citizenship (if applicable), reason for notability, cause of death (if known), and reference.

== October 2025 ==
=== 1 ===
- José Antonio Álvarez Sánchez, 50, Spanish Roman Catholic prelate, auxiliary bishop of Madrid (since 2024), heart attack.
- José Andrada, 87, Argentine actor (Los Velázquez, Johny Tolengo, el majestuoso, Two to Tango).
- Lin Arison, 88, American writer and art patron, co-founder of YoungArts.
- Stan Beckensall, 93, British rock art expert.
- Daniel Bianchi, 63, Uruguayan politician, deputy (2000–2016), senator (2016–2020).
- Claude Bourdin, 82, French politician, deputy (1991–1993), mayor of Beaugency (1995–2014).
- John E. Braggins, 81, New Zealand botanist and bryologist.
- Sir Stephen Brown, 100, British judge, president of the Family Division (1988–1999).
- Stefano Casagranda, 52, Italian racing cyclist, cancer.
- Eric De Rop, 71, Belgian comic book artist.
- Guy Debbaudt, 89, Belgian Olympic field hockey player (1960). (death announced on this date)
- Judith Dupont, 100, French psychoanalyst, translator and editor.
- Judit Elek, 87, Hungarian film director (The Lady from Constantinople, Maria's Day, Memories of a River) and screenwriter.
- Bogusław Fornalczyk, 88, Polish Olympic cyclist (1960).
- Dame Jane Goodall, 91, English zoologist and primatologist, founder of the Jane Goodall Institute and Roots & Shoots, cardiac arrest.
- Edward J. Kennedy, 74, American politician, mayor of Lowell (2016–2018) and member of the Massachusetts Senate (since 2019).
- Alfred H. Kingon, 94, American diplomat.
- Jerry Leggio, 90, American actor (Blaze, The Badge, American Violet).
- Volodymyr Leontiev, 60–61, Ukrainian politician and collaborator, unelected governor of Nova Kakhovka (2022–2023), drone strike.
- Juan Carlos de Lima, 63, Uruguayan football player (Quito, Nacional, Emelec) and manager.
- Gabriel Loubier, 93, Canadian politician, Quebec MNA (1962–1973).
- Lun Gywe, 95, Burmese watercolor painter.
- Hughie McElvaney, 75–76, Irish politician, Monaghan County councillor (1974–2024).
- Balin Miller, 23, American mountaineer, fall.
- Mohamed Hashim Mohd Ali, 88, Malaysian military officer, chief of army (1985–1987) and defence forces (1987–1992), stroke.
- Don Monson, 92, American college basketball coach (Idaho Vandals, Oregon Ducks).
- Claus Offe, 85, German political sociologist (Humboldt-University of Berlin, Hertie School).
- László Örvendi, 74, Hungarian politician, MP (2006–2014).
- Ramreddy Damodar Reddy, 73, Indian politician, Andhra Pradesh MLA (1985–1999, 2004–2014).
- František Rydval, 79, Czech Olympic ski jumper (1968).
- Christopher Sharpless, 80, American Olympic bobsledder (1988), complications from Parkinson's disease.
- Jeanne Sinkford, 92, American dentist and academic administrator.
- Thế Hiển, 69, Vietnamese singer and musician, lung cancer.
- William Timmons, 94, American political lobbyist.
- Gillian Tindall, 87, British writer and historian.
- Annor Walker, 62, Ghanaian football manager (Nania, Accra Great Olympics, Heart of Lions).

=== 2 ===
- Pangalian Balindong, 85, Filipino politician, member of the House of Representatives (1995–1998, 2007–2016) and speaker of the Bangsamoro Parliament (since 2019).
- Roland Bertranne, 75, French rugby union player (Stade Bagnérais, Toulon, national team), complications from Alzheimer's disease.
- Maksim Bondarenko, 44, Russian footballer (Rotor Volgograd, Fakel Voronezh, Baltika Kaliningrad).
- Mindy Carson, 98, American traditional pop singer.
- Miroslav Kráľ, 77, Slovak Olympic footballer (1968).
- Claudio Lombardi, 83, Italian race car engineer (Formula One).
- Manchán Magan, 55, Irish author, broadcaster (No Béarla) and documentary maker, prostate cancer.
- Javier Manrique, 56, Peruvian actor (Camera Café).
- Henry Martínez, 75, Venezuelan musician and songwriter.
- Chhannulal Mishra, 89, Indian Hindustani classical singer.
- Stanley Mitchell, 78, Irish cricketer.
- Park Seung-guk, 85, South Korean politician, MP (1998–2004).
- Richard Pew, 92, American psychologist and Olympic fencer (1956).
- Ahmed Rafiq, 96, Bangladeshi language movement activist and writer.
- Sir David Ratford, 91, British diplomat, ambassador to Norway (1990–1994).
- Hamda Saïed, 85, Tunisian mufti and politician, deputy (1989–1994).
- Camille Senon, 100, French trade unionist, last survivor of the Oradour-sur-Glane massacre.
- Geoff Steel, 76, British racing driver and motor racing team owner.
- Luis Stefanelli, 68, Venezuelan politician, member of the Chamber of Deputies (1994–1999), member of the National Assembly (2016–2019).
- Clara Sumarwati, 58, Indonesian mountaineer, diabetes melitus.
- Giriraj Prasad Tiwari, 104, Indian politician, speaker of the Rajasthan Legislative Assembly (1986–1990).
- Ed Williams, 98, American actor (Police Squad!, The Naked Gun, Father of the Bride).
- Justin Woodward, 43, American chef (Castagna, OK Omens), liver failure.

=== 3 ===
- Aryeh Azulai, 92, Israeli politician, mayor of Ashdod (1983–1989).
- Pierre Berdoy, 89, French photographer.
- Stuart Carter, 66, Australian Olympic rower (1976), cancer.
- Henri Ciriani, 88, Peruvian architect.
- Rameshwar Lal Dudi, 62, Indian politician, MP (1999–2004) and Rajasthan MLA (2013–2018), complications from a stroke.
- Milton Esterow, 97, American art journalist (The New York Times, ARTnews).
- T. J. S. George, 97, Indian biographer.
- Remo Girone, 76, Italian actor (La piovra, Live by Night, Ford v Ferrari).
- Kimberly Hébert Gregory, 52, American actress (Vice Principals, Kevin (Probably) Saves the World, Craig of the Creek), complications from COPD.
- Ernst Homberger, 88, Swiss politician, member of the Government Council of Zürich (1991–1999).
- Marcel Husson, 88, French football player (Metz) and manager (Amnéville, Metz).
- Roland Irolla, 90, French painter.
- Vera Jarach, 97, Italian-Argentine human rights activist (Mothers of Plaza de Mayo).
- Arthur Jones, 39, American football player (Baltimore Ravens, Indianapolis Colts, Washington Redskins), Super Bowl champion (2013).
- Antoni Lallican, 37, French photojournalist, drone strike.
- Edu Manga, 58, Brazilian footballer (Palmeiras, Real Valladolid, national team), kidney disease.
- Achille Enoc Mariano, 91, Italian politician, deputy (1994–1996).
- Patricia Molony, 99, Australian figure skater.
- Anton Pelinka, 83, Austrian political scientist.
- Dame Patricia Routledge, 96, English actress (Keeping Up Appearances, Hetty Wainthropp Investigates, Darling of the Day) and singer, Tony winner (1968).
- Gianfranco Sanguinetti, 77, Italian writer.
- Ogtay Shiraliyev, 75, Azerbaijani physician, minister of healthcare (2005–2021), brain cancer.
- Alexander Tyagunov, 85, Russian politician, MP (1995–1999, 2003–2011).
- Richard A. Weinberg, 82, American developmental psychologist.

=== 4 ===
- Klaas Bom, 87, Dutch engineer.
- Giuseppe Colombo, 77, Italian film producer (The Stendhal Syndrome, Wax Mask, The Phantom of the Opera).
- Mark James Elgar Coode, 87–88, British botanist.
- Ralph DesLauriers, 90, American businessman, cofounder of Bolton Valley Resort.
- Xavier Durringer, 61, French playwright, screenwriter and director (The Conquest), heart attack.
- Burkhard Ebert, 83, German Olympic road racing cyclist (1964, 1968).
- Bernard Julien, 75, Trinidadian cricketer (Kent, national team, West Indies).
- Hartmut Keyler, 89, German architect.
- Ivan Klíma, 94, Czech writer and playwright.
- Vladimir Laptev, 79, Russian politician, mayor of Noginsky District (1989–2015).
- Gérard Laumon, 73, French mathematician.
- Zuhair Manasra, 82, Palestinian politician, governor of Jenin (1996–2002) and Bethlehem (2003–2005).
- Milan Mandarić, 87, Serbian-born American computer industry and football executive, founder of Sanmina Corporation, chairman of Portsmouth (1999–2006) and Leicester City (2006–2009).
- Iam McFaul, 82, Northern Irish football player (Newcastle United, national team) and manager (Guam national team).
- Jimmy Nicholson, 82, Northern Irish footballer (Manchester United, Huddersfield Town, national team).
- Sandhya Shantaram, 93, Indian actress (Jhanak Jhanak Payal Baaje, Do Aankhen Barah Haath, Pinjara).
- BeBe Shopp, 95, American beauty pageant titleholder, Miss America (1948).
- Ammar Siamwalla, 86, Thai economist and politician, president of the Thailand Development Research Institute (1990–1995) and MP (2006–2007).
- Sri Owen, 90, Indonesian cooking teacher and food writer.

=== 5 ===
- Mohammed Abu Ramadan, 72, Palestinian politician, minister of state for planning and administrative development (2012–2014).
- Bobby Allen, 81, American racecar driver.
- Pushpak Bhattacharyya, 63, Indian computer scientist.
- Michael Boland, 75, Canadian ice hockey player (Philadelphia Flyers) and cinematographer (Millennium: Tribal Wisdom and the Modern World).
- Dame Jilly Cooper, 88, English author (Emily, Octavia, Rutshire Chronicles), complications from a fall.
- Ron Dean, 87, American actor (The Dark Knight, The Breakfast Club, The Fugitive).
- Frank Evers, 91, Irish Gaelic footballer (Menlough, Garda GAA, Galway).
- Guillermo Fernández Vara, 66, Spanish coroner and politician, senator (since 2023) and president of Extremadura (2007–2011, 2015–2023), stomach cancer.
- Mick Harrison, 79, English rugby league player (Leeds, Hull F.C., national team).
- Marjorie Hughes, 99, American pop singer.
- Ahmed Taleb Ibrahimi, 93, Algerian politician, minister of education (1965–1970) and foreign affairs (1982–1988).
- Abdul Jabbar, 94, Indian politician, Assam MLA (1985–1996, 2001–2006), fall.
- Ken Jacobs, 92, American filmmaker (Tom, Tom, the Piper's Son, Star Spangled to Death, Blonde Cobra), kidney failure.
- Olavi Köppä, 74, Finnish Olympic speed skater (1976).
- Lotte Ledl, 95, Austrian actress (Burgtheater, The Forester of the Silver Wood, Derrick).
- Emmanuel Ndindabahizi, 74–75, Rwandan economist, minister of finance (1994).
- Alfa-Betty Olsen, 88, American writer and casting director (The Producers).
- Ken Parker, 73, American luthier (Parker Fly), founder of Parker Guitars, cancer.
- Hugues Puel, 93, French economist and priest.
- Orfeo Reda, 92, Italian visual artist.
- Daryl Sanders, 84, American football player (Detroit Lions), heart attack.
- Ashk Ali Tak, 69, Indian politician, MP (2010–2016) and Rajasthan MLA (1985, 1989–1990).
- Jerry Tokofsky, 91, American film executive (Columbia Pictures) and producer (Where's Poppa?, Glengarry Glen Ross).
- DJ Tráva, 60, Czech DJ and producer.
- Véronique Vincent, 68, French singer (The Honeymoon Killers, Aksak Maboul).
- Ann B. Walker, 101, American journalist, editor and radio personality.

=== 6 ===
- Mohamed Tahir Ayala, 74, Sudanese politician, prime minister (2019), governor of Red Sea State (2005–2015) and Gezira State (2015–2019).
- Patrice Bart, 80, French dancer and choreographer.
- Wayne M. Becker, 85, American botanist.
- Thomas Borody, 75, Australian gastroenterologist.
- G. Michael Brown, 82, American attorney and casino regulator.
- Claire Celsi, 59, American politician, member of the Iowa Senate (since 2019).
- Ziedonis Čevers, 65, Latvian politician, minister of the interior (1991–1993, 1997–1998).
- Katherine Clerides, 76, Cypriot politician, MP (1991–2003), cancer.
- Michael Coey, 80, Northern Irish experimental physicist.
- Bruce Cutler, 77, American criminal defense lawyer (John Gotti), kidney failure.
- Arnold D'Arcy, 92, English footballer (Accrington Stanley, Wigan Athletic, Swindon Town).
- Darmono, 72, Indonesian prosecutor, acting attorney general (2010).
- Dana Drábová, 64, Czech physicist, nuclear safety expert and politician.
- Manfred Emmel, 79, German table tennis player and swimmer, eight-time Paralympic champion.
- René Gaillard, 98, French road racing cyclist.
- Gisèle Gallichan, 79, Canadian journalist (CJLR, Radio-Canada).
- Victor Ginsburgh, 86, Belgian economist.
- Kurt Grønning, 89, Danish footballer (B 1913, national team).
- Peter Häberle, 91, German legal scholar.
- Mohamed Hamidi, 84, Moroccan painter.
- Yoshihiro Ito, 43, Japanese baseball player (Chiba Lotte Marines), traffic collision.
- Theo Jörgensmann, 77, German jazz clarinetist.
- Karlinah Atmadja, 95, Indonesian social activist, second lady of Indonesia (1983–1988), lung disease.
- Natana Kasinathan, 84, Indian historian.
- Ben Lewis, 46, English-born Australian actor (Love Never Dies, The Phantom of the Opera), bowel cancer.
- Orvar Lindwall, 84, Swedish Olympic fencer (1960, 1964, 1968).
- Richard G. Luthy, 80, American environmental engineer.
- Aimo Moroni, 91, Italian chef (Aimo and Nadia Moroni).
- Wincenty Olszewski, 91, Polish politician, senator (1993–1997).
- Gerry Ouellette, 86, Canadian hockey player (Boston Bruins).
- Wanda Perdelwitz, 41, German actress (Großstadtrevier, Muxmäuschenstill, Soloalbum).
- Ray's Kim Edm, 36, Chadian rapper and musician.
- Eugene Rotberg, 95, American investment banker (World Bank Group).
- Roger A. Sheldon, 83, British chemist.
- Frank Smith, 94, Canadian football player (Edmonton Eskimos) and coach.
- Filomeno Biagio Tatò, 86, Italian politician, senator (2001–2006).
- Dennis Trudeau, 77, Canadian journalist (CBMT).
- Uma Ukpai, 80, Nigerian evangelical preacher.
- Franz Josef Wagner, 82, German journalist (Bild) and writer.
- John Woodvine, 96, English actor (An American Werewolf in London, Z-Cars, Doctor Who).
- Nikolai Yegorov, 84, Russian politician, senator (1993–1995).

=== 7 ===
- Catarina de Albuquerque, 55, Portuguese lawyer and human rights activist, CEO of Sanitation and Water for All (since 2018).
- Glenn Allison, 95, American bowler.
- Graham Bell, 78, New Zealand police officer and television show host (Police Ten 7), cancer.
- Halid Bešlić, 71, Bosnian-Croatian folk singer.
- Paul Deem, 68, American Olympic cyclist (1976).
- Pye Engström, 97, Swedish sculptor.
- Ian Freebairn-Smith, 93, American composer and arranger ("Evergreen (Love Theme from A Star Is Born)").
- Ľudmila Gajdošíková, 71, Slovak politician and jurist, judge of the Constitutional Court of Slovakia (2000–2019).
- Maurice Giro, 93, French politician, deputy (2002–2007), mayor of Cavaillon (1992–2008).
- Sir John Gurdon, 92, English biologist, Nobel Prize laureate (2012).
- Alan Hawley, 79, English footballer (Brentford, Wimbledon).
- Shirene Human, 45, South African Olympic figure skater (1998), breast cancer.
- Robert Hodges Johnson, 91, American Episcopal prelate, bishop of Western North Carolina (1990–2004).
- Carolyn Cheeks Kilpatrick, 80, American politician, member of the U.S. House of Representatives (1997–2011).
- Patrice Kitebi Kibol Mvul, 71, Congolese politician.
- Don Koivisto, 76, American politician, member of the Michigan House of Representatives (1981–1986) and Senate (1990–2002), complications from Parkinson's disease.
- Gilles Larrain, 86, French-American photographer, heart attack.
- Aldo Morelli, 75, Italian politician, president of the Province of Pistoia (1990–1999).
- Munyoro Nyamau, 88, Kenyan athlete, Olympic champion (1972), gallbladder cancer.
- Chris Ponnet, 68, American Roman Catholic priest.
- Josep Pujadas Domingo, 94, Spanish lawyer, businessman and politician, deputy (1980–1982)
- Alain Roger, 88, French philosopher and writer.
- Djilali Selmi, 79, Algerian footballer (OMR, CRB, national team).
- Rick Shaw, 78, American football player (Calgary Stampeders, Winnipeg Blue Bombers).
- Katie True, 84, American politician, member of the Pennsylvania House of Representatives (1993–2000, 2003–2010).
- Saxon White, 91, Australian rugby union player (New South Wales, national team) and physiologist.
- Baron Wormser, 77, American poet.
- Yen Cheng-kuo, 50, Taiwanese actor (My Native Land, Growing Up, A Summer at Grandpa's), director and calligraphy teacher, lung cancer.
- Saul Zabar, 97, American businessman.

=== 8 ===
- Tofail Ahmed, 71, Bangladeshi political scientist, heart disease.
- Paolo Bonacelli, 88, Italian actor (Salò, or the 120 Days of Sodom, Mission Impossible III, Midnight Express).
- Lawrence Daws, 97, Australian painter and printmaker.
- Wolfgang Fiedler, 73, German politician, member of the Volkskammer (1990) and the Landtag of Thuringia (1990–2014).
- Otto Fräßdorf, 83, German footballer (FC Vorwärts Berlin, East Germany national team), Olympic bronze medalist (1964).
- Lubomír Hrstka, 78, Czech ice hockey player (TJ ZKL/Zetor Brno), coach and businessman, owner of FC Boby Brno (1992–2000).
- Gustav Isernhagen, 88, German politician, member of the Landtag of Lower Saxony (1982–1994).
- Rajvir Jawanda, 35, Indian singer and actor (Subedar Joginder Singh, Jind Jaan), injuries from a traffic collision.
- Terry "Buzzy" Johnson, 86, American Hall of Fame singer (The Flamingos), songwriter ("Baby, Baby Don't Cry", "Here I Go Again") and music producer.
- Joan Bennett Kennedy, 89, American socialite.
- Kim Gwang-won, 84, South Korean politician, MP (1996–2008).
- Christopher Kolade, 92, Nigerian diplomat.
- Vladimir Kurenbin, 79, Russian figure skater.
- Dinny Lowry, 90, Irish footballer (St Patrick's Athletics, Bohemians, national team).
- Joy Matter, 90, Swiss politician, member of the Grand Council of Bern (1978–1988).
- Rod McNicol, 79, Australian photographer.
- György Mezey, 84, Hungarian football player (MTK) and manager (MOL Fehérvár, national team).
- Suman Mokhtarian, 33, Australian mixed martial arts fighter.
- Pierre Moutouari, 75, Congolese singer.
- K. Narahari, 93, Indian politician, Karnataka MLC (1984–2002).
- Pannir Selvam Pranthaman, 38, Malaysian convicted drug trafficker, execution by hanging.
- Gisèle Printz, 92, French politician, senator (1996–2014).
- Miguel Ángel Russo, 69, Argentine football player (Estudiantes, national team) and manager (Boca Juniors), cancer.
- Niyazi Sayın, 98, Turkish ney flautist and music educator.
- Zdravko Šotra, 92, Serbian film director (Zona Zamfirova, Battle of Kosovo, Santa Maria della Salute).
- Nolan R. Williams, 43, American neurophysicist, suicide.
- Kent Wong, 69, American labor leader and scholar.
- Oscar Wyatt, 101, American oil industry executive, founder of Coastal Corporation.
- Eve Zaremba, 94, Canadian mystery writer.

=== 9 ===
- Efrem Amiramov, 69, Russian singer-songwriter.
- Rafael de la Barra Tagle, 94, Chilean Roman Catholic prelate, bishop of Illapel (1989–2010).
- Ernestine Bazemore, 66, American politician, member of the North Carolina Senate (2021–2022).
- Tad R. Callister, 79, American Mormon leader.
- Fede Dorcaz, 29, Argentine singer and model (Las Estrellas Bailan en Hoy), shot.
- Borys Fuksman, 78, Ukrainian businessman (1+1, Hilton Kyiv).
- Josias Gasser, 72, Swiss politician, member of the National Council (2011–2015).
- Varinder Singh Ghuman, 41–42, Indian professional bodybuilder and actor (Kabaddi Once Again, Roar: Tigers of the Sundarbans), heart attack.
- Mike Greenwell, 62, American baseball player (Boston Red Sox) and racing driver (NASCAR Craftsman Truck Series), thyroid cancer.
- Damir Ibrahimović, 60, Bosnian film producer (On the Path, Blum: Masters of Their Own Destiny).
- Marie Immaculée Ingabire, 63, Rwandan human rights activist.
- Aslam Kader, 62, Indian jockey, lung cancer.
- Robert Khalaidjian, 67, Armenian footballer (Ararat Yerevan, FC Kotayk, Armavir).
- Martha Scanlan Klima, 86, American politician, member of the Maryland House of Delegates (1983–2003).
- Billy Koen, 87, American nuclear engineer.
- Kenneth Kredit, 94, American politician.
- Peter Lamptey, 79, Ghanaian footballer (Hearts of Oak, Great Olympics, national team).
- Abdeljabar Machouche, 80, Tunisian footballer (ES Tunis, national team).
- Robert Mailman, 77, Canadian wrongfully convicted prisoner, cancer.
- Hoa Nguyen, 41, American politician, member of the Oregon House of Representatives (since 2023), cancer.
- Kenneth Nordtvedt, 86, American physicist (Nordtvedt effect).
- Anni Pede-Erdkamp, 85, German long-distance runner.
- Tim Reid, 89, Canadian politician, Ontario MPP (1967–1971).
- Udo Schiefner, 66, German politician, MP (2013–2025).
- Jean Dolores Schmidt, 106, American chaplain (Loyola Ramblers).
- Arlo Smith, 98, American lawyer, district attorney of San Francisco (1980–1996).
- Julie Suk, 101, American poet.
- Jonathan Tokeley-Parry, 74, British treasure smuggler, overdose.
- William Twining, 91, British legal scholar.
- Ola Wærhaug, 87, Norwegian biathlete, Olympic silver medalist (1968).
- Frank Wimberley, 99, American artist.
- Amina Yusifgizi, 89, Azerbaijani actress.

=== 10 ===
- Warren Abrahams, 43, South African rugby union coach (Wales women's national team, Belgium women's national team).
- Paul Kato Atita, Beninese lawyer.
- Carlos Barbosa, 81, Colombian actor (La saga, negocio de familia, Holy Expectations, Bermúdez).
- Mirosław Chojecki, 76, Polish publisher, film producer and anti-communist activist.
- Lobsang Chompel, 68, Chinese actor (Xiu Xiu: The Sent Down Girl, Snow Leopard).
- Gwon Hae-ok, 90, South Korean politician, MP (1988–1996).
- Roger Harris, 92, New Zealand cricketer (Auckland, national team).
- Ted Hartley, 100, American actor (Ice Station Zebra, Barefoot in the Park, High Plains Drifter) and producer.
- Heather Hill, 85, American television director (The Young and the Restless).
- Syed Manzoorul Islam, 74, Bangladeshi literary critic, president of PEN Bangladesh (since 2018), complications from a heart attack.
- Bernhard Klee, 89, German orchestral conductor (Radiophilharmonie Hannover, Düsseldorf Symphony Orchestra).
- Csaba Köves, 58, Hungarian fencer, Olympic silver medallist (1992, 1996).
- John Lodge, 82, English Hall of Fame musician (The Moody Blues) and songwriter ("I'm Just a Singer (In a Rock and Roll Band)", "Gemini Dream").
- Desire Moyo, 45, Zimbabwean politician and poet, MP (since 2023), traffic collision.
- Sarwar Jahan Nizam, 72, Bangladeshi naval officer, chief of naval staff (2007–2009) and director of the BCG (2005–2007).
- Thommy Price, 68, American drummer (Joan Jett and the Blackhearts, Scandal, Love Crushed Velvet).
- Charlie Schmaus, 81, American college basketball coach (VMI Keydets).
- Pepe Soho, 53, Mexican landscape and nature photographer, cardiac arrest.
- Adam Strzembosz, 95, Polish lawyer and jurist, first president of the Supreme Court (1990–1998).
- Helmut Stuhlpfarrer, 66, Austrian mountain runner.
- Adrian Sutton, 58, British composer, cancer.
- Alex Wallau, 80, American boxing commentator.

=== 11 ===
- Kevin Ablett, 67, Australian footballer (Hawthorn, Richmond, Geelong).
- Pat Appleyard, 98, British rally driver.
- David J. Armor, 86, American social scientist, academic and author.
- Bruno Bürki, 94, Swiss pastor.
- Marinela Chelaru, 66, Romanian actress.
- Albert Cohen, 93, Israeli actor (Blaumilch Canal, To Take a Wife, Zanzouri), musician and stage director.
- Flavius Domide, 79, Romanian footballer (UTA Arad, national team).
- Tony Fitzpatrick, 66, American collage artist and poet, heart attack.
- Anthony Grey, 87, British journalist (Reuters) and author (Tokyo Bay, The Prime Minister Was a Spy).
- Grubby, 3, American opossum.
- Earl C. Haag, 96, American scholar and linguist.
- Klara Hallik, 92, Estonian politician and political scientist.
- Tom Hansen, 78, American politician, member of the Nebraska Legislature (2007–2015).
- John Irvine, 76, British Anglican priest, dean of Coventry (2001–2012).
- Artie Kaplan, 89, American musician and composer.
- Mohamad Kasebi, 74, Iranian actor (The Father, Saint Mary, Without Permission).
- Diane Keaton, 79, American actress (Annie Hall, The Godfather, Something's Gotta Give), Oscar winner (1978), bacterial pneumonia.
- Gildas Le Lidec, 78, French diplomat, ambassador to Cambodia (1994–1998), ambassador to Japan (2006–2007).
- Jean-Luc Migué, 92, Canadian economist (Fraser Institute, Montreal Economic Institute).
- Arthur Payne, 102, Australian speedway rider. (death announced on this date)
- Michael Pratt, 70, Australian police officer, recipient of the George Cross.
- Hanna Sahlfeld-Singer, 81, Swiss politician, MP (1971–1975).
- Kęstutis Šapka, 75, Lithuanian Olympic high jumper (1972).
- Ian Watkins, 48, Welsh singer (Lostprophets) and convicted child sex offender, stabbed.

=== 12 ===
- Rustam Akhmedov, 81, Uzbek military officer, minister of defense (1991–1997).
- Mandi Ballinger, 50, American politician, member of the Georgia House of Representatives (since 2013), cancer.
- Sir Benjamin Bathurst, 89, British Royal Navy officer, Commander-in-Chief Fleet (1989–1991), vice-chief of the Defence Staff (1991–1993) and First Sea Lord (1993–1995).
- Yvonne Brewster, 87, Jamaican actress (Doctors), theatre director and writer.
- Jackie Burch, 74, American casting director (Die Hard, Predator, Dick Tracy), endometrial cancer.
- Pesi Fonua, 78, Tongan journalist (Matangi Tonga).
- Mark Forster, 81, British author.
- John Graham, 58, Northern Irish-born Canadian racing driver, brain cancer.
- Saleh al-Jafarawi, 27, Palestinian journalist, social media influencer and table tennis player, shot.
- Jack Kane, 89, Canadian ice hockey player (Clinton Comets).
- Vivian King, 95, Canadian Olympic swimmer (1948).
- Liv Køltzow, 80, Norwegian writer, complications from Parkinson's disease.
- Robert P. Lattimer, 80, American chemist (Lubrizol).
- Pierre-Yves Le Rhun, 88–89, French geographer, academic, and Breton activist.
- Doug Lebda, 55, American businessman, CEO of LendingTree, ATV accident.
- Franck Leblanc, 54, French horse trainer and jockey.
- Abdullah Omar Nasseef, 86, Saudi chemist and geologist, secretary general of the Muslim World League (1983–1993) and president of King Abdulaziz University (1979–1983).
- Arthur Nightingale, 94, British actor (Tinker Tailor Soldier Spy, Derek, The Calcium Kid).
- Gurney Norman, 88, American writer (Divine Right's Trip) and poet laureate.
- Tom O'Dea, 76, Irish footballer (Shamrock Rovers, Connecticut Bicentennials, Utah Golden Spikers).
- Cesare Paciotti, 67, Italian shoe designer.
- Thomas Rew, 103, American air force major general.
- Janet Smith, 59, American long-distance runner, cross country senior world champion (1987).
- Conny Staudinger, 98, Austrian Olympic ice hockey player (1956).
- Dobromir Zhechev, 82, Bulgarian footballer (Spartak Sofia, Levski Sofia, national team).

=== 13 ===
- Sandy Alomar Sr., 81, Puerto Rican baseball player (Atlanta Braves, California Angels, New York Yankees).
- Stephen R. Anderson, 82, American linguist, esophageal cancer.
- Tony Caunter, 88, English actor (EastEnders, Queenie's Castle, Juliet Bravo).
- Richard P. Cueroni, 95, American Coast Guard admiral.
- Patrick Dimon, 79, Greek-Brazilian singer.
- Marty Domres, 78, American football player (San Diego Chargers, Baltimore Colts, New York Jets).
- Beatrice Doran, Irish historian and author.
- Michael Fagun, 90, Nigerian Roman Catholic prelate, auxiliary bishop of Ondo (1971–1972) and bishop of Ekiti (1972–2010).
- Miss Major Griffin-Gracy, 78, American LGBT rights activist (TGI Justice Project).
- Kyriakos D. Kassis, 79, Greek poet and painter.
- Anna Kyriakou, 96, Greek actress (Zorba the Greek, Liar Wanted, Safe Sex).
- Myron Lapka, 69, American football player (New York Giants, Los Angeles Rams, Green Bay Packers), cancer.
- John McCrumbly, 72, American football player (Buffalo Bills).
- Anthony Merchant, 81, Canadian lawyer, businessman and politician, Saskatchewan MLA (1975–1978), cancer.
- Wazir Mohammad, 95, Pakistani cricketer (Karachi Whites, national team).
- Joy Ogwu, 79, Nigerian politician and diplomat, foreign minister (2006–2007) and permanent representative to the United Nations (2008–2017).
- René Olivares, 78, Chilean painter and designer.
- Gordon Parr, 86, English footballer (Bristol City, Waterford).
- Gilles Sacksick, 83, French painter and lithographer.
- Bruce Saville, 80, Canadian businessman and philanthropist (Edmonton Investors Group).
- Rosemary Sparrow, 100, British Olympic alpine skier (1948).
- Drew Struzan, 78, American film poster illustrator (Star Wars, Indiana Jones, Back to the Future), complications from Alzheimer's disease.
- Raju Talikote, 62, Indian actor (Manasaare, Pancharangi, Topiwala) and comedian, heart attack.
- Sara Terry, 70, American photographer and filmmaker.
- Matt Tolfrey, 44, English DJ, record producer and label owner.
- Dolly Van Doll, 87, Italian trans vedette, stroke.
- Wan Runnan, 78, Chinese software engineer and political dissident, heart disease.
- Zoë Wicomb, 76, South African writer (You Can't Get Lost in Cape Town).
- Agnes Wolbert, 67, Dutch politician, member of the House of Representatives (2006–2017).
- Michel Zaoui, 80, French human rights lawyer.

=== 14 ===
- Dick Addrisi, 84, American singer (Addrisi Brothers) and songwriter ("Never My Love").
- Roberta Alexander, 76, American operatic soprano.
- Sydney Anglo, 91, British historian and academic.
- Luc Ayang, 78, Cameroonian politician, prime minister (1983–1984).
- Lawrence J. Block, 74, American jurist, judge of the U.S. Court of Federal Claims (2002–2016).
- Larry Burright, 88, American baseball player (Los Angeles Dodgers, New York Mets).
- Nancy Chodorow, 81, American sociologist and academic.
- DJ Chosen Few, 53, Dutch DJ and music producer.
- D'Angelo, 51, American singer-songwriter ("Lady", "Brown Sugar", "Untitled (How Does It Feel)"), four-time Grammy winner, pancreatic cancer.
- Alexander Dityatin, 68, Russian gymnast, three-time Olympic champion (1980), heart failure.
- Craig Eaton, 71, American baseball player (Kansas City Royals).
- József Ékes, 74, Hungarian politician, MP (1998–2014).
- Élie Fallu, 93, Canadian politician, Quebec MNA (1976–1985).
- Drexel Gomez, 88, Bahamian Anglican prelate, bishop of Barbados (1972–1992) and archbishop of the West Indies (1997–2009), stomach cancer.
- Moshe Hauer, 60, American rabbi, executive vice president of the Orthodox Union, heart attack.
- Daniel Hoeffel, 96, French politician, three-time senator, minister of transport (1980–1981).
- Rosalind Howells, Baroness Howells of St Davids, 94, British politician, member of the House of Lords (1999–2019).
- Penelope Milford, 77, American actress (Coming Home, Heathers, Shenandoah).
- Saeed Mozaffari, 83, Iranian voice actor, cardiac arrest.
- Na Tang, 59, Taiwanese singer and yoga teacher, lung cancer.
- Hiroyuki Oki, 61, Japanese film director (I Like You, I Like You Very Much).
- Babu M. Palissery, 67, Indian politician, Kerala MLA (2006–2016), complications from Parkinson's disease.
- Vlastimil Sehnal, 66, Czech politician and businessman, senator (2004–2010).
- Samuel Lee Smithers, 72, American convicted murderer, execution by lethal injection.
- Fofō Iosefa Fiti Sunia, 88, American Samoan politician.
- Nasser Taghvai, 84, Iranian film director (Captain Khorshid, Tales of Kish, Unruled Paper) and screenwriter.
- Yuriy Tarnawsky, 91, Ukrainian-American poet.
- Charles S. Tobias, 91, Canadian-born American entrepreneur.
- Randy Wiel, 74, Dutch basketball player (BV Amstelveen, Elmex Leiden) and coach (EiffelTowers Den Bosch), pancreatic cancer.
- Yap Shing Xuen, 15, Malaysian school girl, stabbed.

=== 15 ===
- R. Balasaraswathi Devi, 97, Indian playback singer (Chenchu Lakshmi, Swapna Sundari) and actress (Bilhana).
- Jackie Berger, 77, Belgian dubbing actress.
- Jim Bolger, 90, New Zealand diplomat and politician, prime minister (1990–1997), MP (1972–1998), and ambassador to the United States (1998–2002), kidney failure.
- Carlota Bustelo, 85, Spanish politician, deputy (1977–1979), director of the Institute of Women (1983–1988).
- Steve Butland, 84, Canadian politician, MP (1988–1993).
- Ben Cameron, 44, Australian cricketer (South Australia).
- Charles Ray Crawford, 59, American convicted murderer, execution by lethal injection.
- Hernán Damiani, 66, Argentine politician, deputy (2001–2005), heart attack.
- Ancilla Dent, 92, English Roman Catholic nun and writer.
- Pankaj Dheer, 68, Indian actor (Mahabharat, Chandrakanta, The Great Maratha), cancer.
- Agha Siraj Durrani, 72, Pakistani politician, three-time acting governor of Sindh, member (2013–2023) and speaker (2013–2024) of the Provincial Assembly of Sindh.
- Samantha Eggar, 86, English-American actress (The Collector, Doctor Dolittle, The Brood), chronic lymphocytic leukemia.
- Orlando Fernández Medina, 80, Venezuelan journalist and politician, governor of Lara (1995–2000).
- Edward Joseph Gilbert, 88, American Roman Catholic prelate, bishop of Roseau (1994–2001) and archbishop of Port of Spain (2001–2011).
- Ida Gotkovsky, 92, French composer and pianist.
- Helen Gregory, 79, Australian historian and author.
- Ramiz Guliyev, 78, Azerbaijani musician.
- Kazuo Ikehiro, 95, Japanese film director (Zatoichi and the Chest of Gold, Zatoichi's Pilgrimage, Nemuri Kyōshirō manji giri), heart attack.
- Lee Sang-min, 67, South Korean politician, MP (2004–2024), cardiac arrest.
- Madhumati, 87, Indian actress and dancer.
- John Morris, 84, American baseball player (Baltimore Orioles, Milwaukee Brewers, San Francisco Giants).
- Béla Nagy, 82, Hungarian Olympic archer (1972, 1980).
- Ravi Naik, 79, Indian politician, chief minister of Goa (1991–1993, 1994), MP (1998–1999), and four-time Goa MLA, heart attack.
- Eric D. Newsom, 82, American diplomat, assistant secretary of state for political-military affairs (1998–2000).
- Raila Odinga, 80, Kenyan politician, prime minister (2008–2013), MP (1993–2013), and African Union High Representative for Infrastructure Development (2018–2023), cardiac arrest.
- Sakineh (Simin) M. Redjali, 91, Iranian-American psychologist and author.
- Soumana Sacko, 74, Malian politician and economist, acting prime minister (1991–1992).
- Shōichi Tanaka, 88, Japanese politician, member of the House of Representatives (1996–2000).
- Ivan Zafirov, 77, Bulgarian footballer (CSKA Sofia, Sliven, national team).

=== 16 ===
- Alireza Afshar, 74, Iranian military officer and academic administrator, commander of Basij (1990–1998) and IRGC (1984–1987), chancellor of IHU (1998–2000), heart disease.
- Shahabuddin Ahmed, 77, Bangladeshi independence activist and pilot.
- Gustavo Aliaga, 70, Bolivian diplomat and politician, deputy (2020–2025), complications from surgery.
- Gustavo Angarita, 83, Colombian actor (The Strategy of the Snail, The 33, Memories of My Father).
- Baek Se-hee, 35, South Korean author (I Want to Die but I Want to Eat Tteokbokki).
- Yondo Black, 87, Cameroonian lawyer.
- Chris Di Staulo, 34, Italian-Canadian film and music video director ("A Few Good Stories").
- Klaus Doldinger, 89, German jazz saxophonist (Passport) and composer (Tatort theme, Das Boot).
- Bob Franke, 78, American singer-songwriter, complications from surgery.
- Ace Frehley, 74, American Hall of Fame guitarist (Kiss) and songwriter ("Cold Gin", "Rocket Ride"), brain bleed following a fall.
- Thomas N. George, 87, American politician, member of the Massachusetts House of Representatives (1997–2005).
- Barbara Gips, 89, American copywriter.
- Claudio Barroso Gomes, 73, Brazilian metallurgist and politician.
- Tony Good, 72, English cricketer (Lancashire, Cheshire). (death announced on this date)
- Arif Erkin Güzelbeyoğlu, 90, Turkish actor (Yabancı Damat, The White Angel, Muhteşem Yüzyıl).
- Claes Hake, 80, Swedish sculptor (1998 Gothenburg discotheque fire memorial).
- Tomonobu Itagaki, 58, Japanese video game designer (Dead or Alive, Ninja Gaiden, Devil's Third).
- Morton Kaish, 98, American artist.
- Bette E. Landman, 88, American anthropologist and academic administrator, president of Arcadia University (1985–2004).
- Waké Nibombé, 51, Togolese footballer (Goldfields Obuasi, national team).
- Kanchha Sherpa, 92, Nepalese mountaineer (1953 British Mount Everest expedition).
- Shin Sang-sik, 88, South Korean politician, MP (1981–1996).
- Susan Stamberg, 87, American radio journalist (NPR).
- Jayananda Warnaweera, 64, Sri Lankan cricketer (Galle, national team).
- Jack White, 85, German footballer (Viktoria Köln, PSV Eindhoven), composer, and record producer ("Gloria"), suicide. (body discovered on this date)
- Larry Williams, 62, American football player (Cleveland Browns, San Diego Chargers, New England Patriots), heart disease.

=== 17 ===
- Tova Ben-Dov, 88, Israeli Zionist activist, president of WIZO (2012–2016).
- Gilles Blais, 84, Canadian cinematographer (How It's Made) and film director.
- Philippe Collin, 93, French film director and actor (The Lady Banker).
- Sofia Corradi, 91, Italian pedagogist, inventor of the Erasmus Programme.
- Alfred Gonti Pius Datubara, 91, Indonesian Roman Catholic prelate, auxiliary bishop (1975–1976) and archbishop (1976–2009) of Medan.
- Richard Djerf, 55, American convicted mass murderer, execution by lethal injection.
- Milan Dobeš, 96, Slovak painter and graphic artist.
- Zsolt Egyed, 51, Hungarian politician, MP (2010–2018). (death announced on this date)
- Pepi Erben, 97, German Olympic alpine skier (1952).
- Jacob Ericksson, 58, Swedish actor (Tsatsiki, morsan och polisen, Adam & Eva, The Whodunit Detective Agency), lymphoma.
- Joseph C. Goulden, 91, American writer and journalist, heart failure.
- Donald C. Griffin, 83, American physicist.
- Guy Hardy, 75, Canadian politician, Quebec MLA (2014–2018).
- Leonid Hrach, 77, Ukrainian-Russian politician, MP (2002–2012) and chairman of the Supreme Council of Crimea (1998–2002).
- Shivaji Bhanudas Kardile, 66, Indian politician and convicted murderer, Maharashtra MLA (2009–2018), cardiac arrest.
- Colin Longden, 92, English footballer (Rotherham United, York City).
- Vidar Lønn-Arnesen, 85, Norwegian radio and television presenter.
- Carlos López Rivera, 67, Puerto Rican politician, mayor of Dorado (since 1987), liver cancer.
- Lollie Mara, 86, Filipino actress.
- Murray Mednick, 86, American playwright.
- Bernd Meinunger, 81, German lyricist ("Ein bißchen Frieden") and record producer, multiple organ failure.
- Thomas Metzger, 91–92, American sinologist and academic.
- Ed Moloney, 77, Irish journalist and author (A Secret History of the IRA).
- Johan Munck, 82, Swedish lawyer, justice (1987–2007) and president (2007–2010) of the Supreme Court of Sweden.
- Tomiichi Murayama, 101, Japanese politician, prime minister (1994–1996) and MP (1972–1980, 1983–2000).
- Charles J. Otto, 61, American politician and farmer, member of the Maryland House of Delegates (since 2011).
- Gino Pivatelli, 92, Italian football player (Bologna, national team) and manager (Ravenna).
- Bill Pleis, 88, American baseball player (Minnesota Twins).
- Jimmy Rolfe, 93, English footballer (Chester City, Crewe Alexandra, Barrow). (death announced on this date)
- Duke Roufus, 55, American kickboxer, founder of Roufusport.
- Hal Sirowitz, 76, American poet, complications from Parkinson's disease.
- Martin Townsend, 65, British journalist, editor of the Sunday Express (2001–2018), pancreatic cancer.
- Phyllis Trible, 92, American feminist biblical scholar.

=== 18 ===
- Paul Boutin, 63, American journalist, cancer.
- Martine Brochard, 81, French-Italian actress (Paprika, The Nun and the Devil, Eyeball).
- Janusz Bugajski, 71, American political scientist.
- Enric Canals, 73, Spanish journalist and television producer, director of Televisió de Catalunya (1984–1989), cancer.
- Gertrude Ehrlich, 102, Austrian-born American mathematician.
- Eduardo Ermita, 90, Filipino military officer and politician, executive secretary (2004–2010), representative (1992–2001), and twice secretary of National Defense.
- Lady Annabel Goldsmith, 91, English socialite, namesake of Annabel's.
- José Manuel Gómez Vázquez Aldana, 88, Mexican architect.
- Baltasar Gonçalves, 77, Portuguese footballer (Sporting CP, Belenenses, national team).
- Clinton Harden, 78, American politician, member of the New Mexico Senate (2003–2012).
- Eileen Harris, 92, American-British architectural historian and author.
- Roy Jacobsen, 70, Norwegian novelist, complications from surgery.
- Petra Kammerevert, 59, German politician, MEP (2009–2024).
- Sergey Kara-Murza, 86, Russian chemist, historian and political philosopher.
- Dita Kraus, 96, Czech-Israeli teacher and Holocaust librarian.
- Marion Lewis, 100, Canadian medical researcher.
- Doug Martin, 36, American football player (Tampa Bay Buccaneers, Oakland Raiders).
- Ramatou Baba Moussa, Beninese politician, deputy (1991–1995).
- Ra'ouf Mus'ad, 88, Egyptian playwright, journalist, and novelist.
- Don Perdue, 75, American politician, member of the West Virginia House of Delegates (1999–2016).
- Sam Rivers, 48, American bassist, (Limp Bizkit) cardiac arrest.
- Alison Rose, 81, American model and writer (The New Yorker). (death announced on this date)
- Philly Ryan, 56–57, Irish Gaelic footballer (Clonmel Commercials) and manager (Tipperary).
- Bill Salonen, 90, Canadian junior ice hockey administrator.
- Josef Schramm, 87, German Olympic ice hockey player (1968). (death announced on this date)
- Olga Sippl, 105, German politician.
- Bernie Smith, 84, American baseball player (Milwaukee Brewers).
- Lia Smith, 21, American student, suicide.
- Henry Sorrell, 82, American football player (Denver Broncos, Hamilton Tiger-Cats, BC Lions).
- Stephen Starring, 64, American football player (New England Patriots).
- Margaret Tedesco, 73, American curator, visual artist and dancer, cancer.
- Mircea Tiberian, 70, Romanian jazz pianist and composer.
- Trần Phương, 98, Vietnamese politician, minister of domestic trade (1981–1982).
- Marcel Weyland, 98, Polish-born Australian translator.
- Yang Chen-Ning, 103, Chinese theoretical physicist (Yang–Mills theory, Wu–Yang dictionary, Lee–Yang theorem), Nobel Prize laureate (1957).

=== 19 ===
- István Ágh, 87, Hungarian poet.
- Trevor Bentham, 82, British scriptwriter (A Month by the Lake).
- Dewey Bohling, 87, American football player (New York Jets, Buffalo Bills).
- Chéri Chérin, 70, Congolese painter.
- Jagannath Prasad Das, 94, Indian-born Canadian educational psychologist.
- Duncan Davidson, 84, British housebuilding industry executive, founder of Persimmon plc.
- Els de Groen, 75, Dutch writer and politician, MEP (2004–2009).
- Anthony Jackson, 73, American bassist.
- Abdul Rauf al-Kasm, 93, Syrian architect and politician, prime minister (1980–1987) and governor of Damascus (1979–1980).
- Bill Kern, 92, American baseball player (Kansas City Athletics).
- Rob Mallicoat, 60, American baseball player (Houston Astros), colon cancer.
- Mickey McGuire, 84, American baseball player (Baltimore Orioles).
- Warren McVea, 79, American football player (Cincinnati Bengals, Kansas City Chiefs).
- Mo, 58, American professional wrestler (PPW, PWF, WWF), blood infection and pneumonia.
- Jesús Montero, 35, Venezuelan baseball player (New York Yankees, Seattle Mariners), injuries sustained in a traffic collision.
- Bob Mulholland, 78, American political strategist.
- Houchang Nahavandi, 92, Iranian politician and academic administrator, minister of science (1978), president of Pahlavi University (1968–1971) and the University of Tehran (1971–1976).
- Daniel Naroditsky, 29, American chess grandmaster, writer and commentator, cardiac arrhythmia.
- Monique Pelletier, 99, French women's rights activist and politician, minister responsible for women's rights (1978–1981), member of the constitutional council (2000–2004).
- Buckley Petawabano, 77, Cree Canadian cinematographer.
- Erik Rico, American singer-songwriter and producer. (death announced on this date)
- Ken Riley, 85, English Anglican clergyman, dean of Manchester (1993–2005).
- Gibbons Ruark, 83, American poet.
- Jerry Stalcup, 86, American football player (Los Angeles Rams, Denver Broncos).
- Magdalena Tasheva, 72, Bulgarian journalist and politician.
- Julius Timothy, 72, Dominican politician, deputy prime minister (1995–2000).
- Ioannis Yannas, 90, Greek-American biomedical engineer.

=== 20 ===
- Asrani, 84, Indian actor (Sholay, Khatta Meetha) and director (Dil Hi To Hai).
- Mikhail Bakharev, 78, Ukrainian-Russian journalist, editor and politician.
- Richard Barringer, 87, American politician and writer.
- Robert Bartlett, 86, American surgeon.
- Brian Bennett, 88, Australian footballer (South Melbourne).
- Gilbert Bouchet, 78, French politician, senator (since 2014), complications from amyotrophic lateral sclerosis.
- Christian Caujolle, 72, French journalist and photographer, co-founder of Agence Vu.
- Morris Chapman, 84, American pastor, president of the Southern Baptist Convention (1990–1992).
- Robert R. Chase, 77, American author.
- Choi Chang-gyu, 88, South Korean politician, MP (1981–1988).
- Lorence G. Collins, 93, American petrologist.
- Oliver Colvile, 66, British politician, MP (2010–2017).
- Willis Crenshaw, 84, American football player (St. Louis Cardinals, Denver Broncos).
- Michael DeLano, 84, American actor (Ocean's Eleven, Magnum, P.I., Commando) and singer.
- Jim Douglas, 83, Scottish guitarist, banjoist and author. (death announced on this date)
- Bonette Élombe, 36–37, Congolese teacher and social media influencer.
- Ellen Louise Graham, 81, American journalist (The Wall Street Journal).
- Caroline Jackson, 78, British politician, MEP (1984–2009), complications from Parkinson's disease.
- Anto Jakovljević, 63, Bosnian footballer (Sarajevo, Hrvatski dragovoljac, Suhopolje).
- Ed Kerns, 80, American abstract artist and educator.
- Ali Mahjoubi, 85–86, Tunisian historian and academic (Tunis University).
- Edoardo Menichelli, 86, Italian Roman Catholic cardinal, archbishop of Chieti-Vasto (1994–2004) and Ancona-Osimo (2004–2017).
- Karomatullohi Mirzo, 82, Tajik writer.
- Kartini Muljadi, 95, Indonesian pharmaceutical industry executive.
- Louis Pace, 77, Maltese footballer (Valletta, national team) and restaurateur.
- Nebojša Pavković, 79, Serbian military officer and convicted war criminal, chief of the General Staff of Yugoslavia (2000–2002).
- Felicito Payumo, 88, Filipino civil servant and politician, representative (1987–1998), chairman of the SBMA (1998–2004) and the BCDA (2011–2012).
- Selma van de Perre, 103, Dutch-British World War II resistance fighter.
- Bob Reinhart, 87, American basketball coach (Georgia State Panthers).
- Mahadeo Shivankar, 85, Indian politician, MP (1989–1991, 2004–2009) and twice Maharashtra MLA.
- So You Think, 18, New Zealand-bred Hall of Fame Thoroughbred racehorse and sire.
- Carla Stellweg, 83, Dutch art historian.
- Arthur Waskow, 92, American rabbi, author and political activist.
- Zhou Guozhi, 88, Chinese physical chemist, member of the Chinese Academy of Sciences.

=== 21 ===
- Zdeněk Bláha, 95, Czech composer, music editor and bagpiper.
- Fernand Bothy, 99, Belgian Olympic boxer (1948).
- Warlito Cajandig, 81, Filipino Roman Catholic prelate, vicar apostolic of Calapan (1989–2022).
- Michael Calnan, Irish politician, senator (1993–1997).
- Heorhii Chyzhevskyi, 101, Ukrainian swimmer and World War II veteran.
- Rajivdada Deshmukh, Indian politician, Maharashtra MLA (2009–2014), heart attack.
- Jack Heinrich, 88, Canadian politician, British Columbia MLA (1979–1986).
- István Katona, 97, Hungarian Roman Catholic prelate, auxiliary bishop of Vác (1989–1997) and of Eger (1997–2013).
- Oleg Ladik, 54, Ukrainian-born Canadian Olympic wrestler (1996).
- Davey Langit, 38, Filipino singer, songwriter and multi-instrumentalist, spondylodiscitis.
- Sheldon Lee, 92, Canadian politician, New Brunswick MLA (1978–2003).
- Jon Lilley, 78, Australian footballer (St Kilda).
- Yogendra Makwana, 91, Indian politician, MP (1973–1988).
- Michael McKee, 85, American tenants rights activist.
- Robert Morkot, 67–68, British archaeologist and academic, cancer.
- Achille Mouebo, 54, Congolese singer-songwriter.
- Abdelkader Moutaa, 85, Moroccan actor (Wechma, The Violent Silence, Beyond the Door).
- Gregory B. Newby, 60, Canadian computer scientist, pancreatic cancer.
- Sir James Nursaw, 93, British lawyer and public servant, HM Procurator General and Treasury Solicitor (1988–1992), chest infection.
- Jim Peacock, 87, Australian molecular biologist.
- Zbigniew Pilarczyk, 75, Polish historian and academic.
- Francisco Pinto Balsemão, 88, Portuguese politician, prime minister (1981–1983) and three-time MP.
- Dionysis Savvopoulos, 80, Greek singer-songwriter, heart attack.
- Otto Schück, 99, Czech nephrologist and academic.
- Zbyšek Sion, 87, Czech painter and printmaker.
- Michael Smuss, 99, Polish painter and Holocaust survivor, last survivor of the Warsaw Ghetto Uprising.
- Daniel Suidani, 55, Solomon Islander politician, premier of Malaita Province (2019–2023).
- Paulina Tamayo, 61, Ecuadorian singer.

=== 22 ===
- Emman Atienza, 19, Filipino-Taiwanese social media personality and mental health advocate, suicide by hanging.
- David Ball, 66, English musician (Soft Cell, The Grid).
- Elisabeth Beck-Gernsheim, 79, German sociologist.
- William Carris, 81, American politician, member of the Vermont Senate (2007–2012).
- Derek Chadwick, 84, Australian footballer (East Perth) and cricketer (Western Australia).
- Eknath Vasant Chitnis, 100, Indian space scientist, director of the Space Applications Centre (1981–1985).
- Lou Clarizio, 94, American baseball player (Chicago American Giants).
- Lynn Dalby, 78, English actress (Emmerdale Farm, Budgie, Legend of the Werewolf).
- Jackie Ferrara, 95, American sculptor and draftswoman, assisted suicide.
- David J. Fischer, 92, American politician, mayor of St. Petersburg (1991–2001).
- Noel Hobson, 91, New Zealand Olympic field hockey player (1956, 1960).
- Normand Lapointe, 86, Canadian politician, MP (1980–1984).
- Larry N. Larson, 89, American politician.
- Jacques Mailhot, 63, Canadian ice hockey player (Quebec Nordiques).
- Mick McNeil, 85, English footballer (Middlesbrough, Ipswich Town, national team).
- Willis Patterson, 94, American bass-baritone.
- Dyfrig Rees, 102, Welsh track and field athlete.
- Lennart Svensson, 90, Swedish footballer (Malmö FF, national team).
- Joeli Veitayaki, 58, Fijian rugby union player (King Country, Northland, national team).
- Charles Martin Wamika, 72, Ugandan Roman Catholic prelate, auxiliary bishop of Tororo (1993–2010) and bishop of Jinja (since 2010).
- Richard Wolfenden, 90, English academic.

=== 23 ===
- Maciej Adamkiewicz, 59, Polish pharmaceutical businessman and surgeon.
- Reinhard Adler, 78, German footballer (KSV Hessen Kassel, Tennis Borussia Berlin).
- Nana Konadu Agyeman Rawlings, 76, Ghanaian politician, first lady (1979, 1981–2001) and founder of the National Democratic Party.
- Tahura Ali, 69, Bangladeshi politician, MP (1996–2001, 2009–2014), heart and kidney disease.
- Otto Barch, 81, Kyrgyz Olympic race walker (1968, 1972, 1976).
- Axel D. Becke, 72, German-born Canadian physical chemist.
- Bertrand Blanchet, 93, Canadian Roman Catholic prelate, bishop of Gaspé (1973–1992) and archbishop of Rimouski (1992–2008).
- Gunther Danne, 82, German Olympic sports shooter (1972).
- Bruce Givner, 74, American attorney, complications from leukemia.
- Carol Hurd Green, 90, American scholar and author.
- Alison Isenberg, 63, American historian.
- Japanese, 52, Panamanian singer, complications from diabetes.
- Jung Dong-yoon, 87, South Korean politician, MP (1985–1992).
- June Lockhart, 100, American actress (Lost in Space, Lassie, Petticoat Junction).
- Álvaro Laborinho Lúcio, 83, Portuguese judge and politician, minister of justice (1990–1995) and deputy (1995–1996).
- Josip Lukačević, 41, Bosnian footballer (Čelik Zenica, Osijek, national team).
- Piera McArthur, 96, British-born New Zealand painter.
- John McKenna, 87, Irish hurler (Borrisokane, Burgess, Tipperary).
- Juan Carlos Moreno Poggio, 43, Uruguayan agricultural technician and politician, deputy (2020–2025), cancer.
- Steven Moss, 62, American author.
- Tim O'Donovan, 93, British monarchist, Court Circular analyst.
- Piyush Pandey, 70, Indian advertising executive.
- Lluís Permanyer, 86, Spanish journalist and writer, heart attack.
- K. Ponnusamy, 74, Indian politician, Tamil Nadu MLA (2006–2011, since 2021), heart attack.
- Krit Ratanarak, 79, Thai businessman and politician, senator (1981–1992).
- Franco Reviglio, 90, Italian politician, minister of finance (1979–1981, 1993) and senator (1992–1994).
- Elina Salo, 89, Finnish actress (Inspector Palmu's Mistake, The Diary of a Worker, Take Care of Your Scarf, Tatiana).
- Val Schneider, 81, German-born Canadian football player and executive.
- Viktor Shustikov, 86, Russian footballer (Torpedo Moscow, Soviet Union national team).
- Kellogg Stelle, 77, American-born British theoretical physicist.
- Tim Tackett, 84, American martial artist.
- Tong Zeng, 69, Chinese human rights activist (Letters to Tong Zeng).
- Ellen Bryant Voigt, 82, American poet.
- David Wilde, 90, English pianist, complications from dementia.

=== 24 ===
- Julius Babatunde Adelakun, 90, Nigerian Roman Catholic prelate, auxiliary bishop (1972–1973) and bishop (1973–2009) of Oyo.
- José Argoitia, 85, Spanish footballer (Basconia, Athletic Bilbao, Racing de Santander).
- Anna Balletbò, 81, Spanish journalist and politician, deputy (1979–2000).
- Giuliano Besson, 75, Italian Olympic alpine skier (1972).
- Cao Ping, 67, Chinese Olympic volleyball player (1984).
- Steven W. Carabatsos, 87, American screenwriter and story editor (Star Trek: The Original Series).
- Dave Coskunian, 77, Turkish-born American soccer player (Los Angeles Toros, San Jose Earthquakes, United States national team).
- Carol Davis, 93, American sports team owner, co-owner of the Las Vegas Raiders and Las Vegas Aces.
- Marcie Free, 71, American singer (King Kobra, Unruly Child).
- John Handegard, 87, American Hall of Fame tenpin bowler.
- André Herrero, 87, French rugby union player (Toulon, RRC Nice, national team) and coach.
- Andy Hinson, 95, American football player (Bethune–Cookman Wildcats) and coach (Cheyney Wolves).
- Paul Hüttel, 90, Danish actor (Ballad of Carl-Henning, Matador, Pyrus).
- Kathy Karpan, 83, American politician, secretary of state of Wyoming (1987–1995).
- Ingar Knudtsen, 80, Norwegian writer.
- André Lombard, 75, Swiss chess player.
- Max Lorenz, 86, German footballer (Werder Bremen, Eintracht Braunschweig, West Germany national team).
- J. William Middendorf, 101, American diplomat, secretary of the Navy (1974–1977), ambassador to the Netherlands (1969–1973) and the European Union (1985–1987).
- Ján Nagy, 80, Slovak Olympic weightlifter (1976).
- Rajendra Kishore Panda, 81, Indian poet and novelist.
- Peace, 51, American rapper (Freestyle Fellowship).
- Sirikit, 93, Thai queen consort (1950–2016), blood infection.
- Jonathan Smallwood, 50, British psychologist.
- Benita Valente, 91, American soprano.
- Bob Wilson, 91, Scottish footballer (Aberdeen, Norwich City, Gillingham).

=== 25 ===
- Tony Adams, 84, Welsh actor (Crossroads, Doctor Who, General Hospital).
- David Adamski, 75, American entomologist.
- Carlos Alderete, 92, Argentine politician, PAMI auditor (1994–1995), minister of labor (1987).
- Björn Andrésen, 70, Swedish actor (Death in Venice, Midsommar, Shelley) and musician.
- Gérard Badini, 94, French jazz saxophonist.
- Cam Brown, 56, Canadian ice hockey player (Vancouver Canucks), motorcycle collision.
- Sharon Camp, 81, American entrepreneuse.
- Mario De Grassi, 88, Italian footballer (Triestina, Potenza, Casertana).
- Mauro Di Francesco, 74, Italian actor (Attila flagello di Dio, An Ideal Adventure, Chewingum) and comedian.
- Idzi Drzycimski, 91, Polish academic and biologist.
- Rolf Dupuy, 79, French academic.
- Tom Edwards, 80, British radio presenter (Radio City, Radio Caroline, BBC Radio 1), cancer.
- Christopher Willis Gortner, 60–61, American author.
- Heber Jentzsch, 90, American Scientology executive (Church of Scientology International), actor and journalist (Los Angeles Free Press).
- John Kowalko, 80, American politician, member of the Delaware House of Representatives (2006–2022).
- Manuel Lapuente, 81, Mexican footballer (Necaxa, national team) and manager (national team), pneumonia.
- Miriam Learra, 88, Cuban actress (The Teacher, The Galíndez File, 7 Days in Havana).
- Ann Lee, 96, American cannabis activist.
- Nick Mangold, 41, American football player (New York Jets), kidney disease.
- Franco Mari, 83, Italian actor (All the Moron's Men, Italiano medio, Omicidio all'italiana) and comedian.
- Floria Márquez, 75, Venezuelan singer, stroke.
- José Moreira de Melo, 84, Brazilian Roman Catholic prelate, bishop of Itapeva (1996–2016).
- John N. Miksic, 78, American archaeologist, pneumonia.
- Ofer Nachshon, 59, Israeli broadcaster and radio announcer.
- Martin Perlich, 88, American broadcaster.
- Louie Reyes, 74, Filipino jazz singer.
- Margaret Romans, 113, Latvian-Canadian supercentenarian.
- Jeremy Searle, 72, Canadian politician, member of the Montreal City Council (2013–2017).
- Nabil Shaban, 72, Jordanian-British actor (Doctor Who).
- Satish Shah, 74, Indian actor (Jaane Bhi Do Yaaro, Sarabhai vs Sarabhai, Om Shanti Om) and comedian, kidney failure.
- Hamilton O. Smith, 94, American microbiologist, Nobel Prize laureate (1978).
- John W. Sweeny Jr., 76, American judge, justice of the New York Supreme Court (1999–2019).
- Dick Taverne, Baron Taverne, 97, British politician, MP (1962–1974) and member of the House of Lords (1996–2025).
- Ria van Velsen, 82, Dutch Olympic backstroke swimmer (1960, 1964).
- Blossom Wigdor, 101, Canadian clinical psychologist and gerontologist.

=== 26 ===
- David Bellos, 80, British academic, translator and biographer (Jacques Tati: His Life and Art).
- Karim Bitar, 60, American businessman, pancreatic cancer.
- Alicia Bonet, 78, Mexican actress (Viviana).
- J. Alfred Broaddus, 86, American banker, president of the Federal Reserve Bank of Richmond (1993–2004).
- Tim Cook, 54, Canadian military historian, Hodgkin's lymphoma.
- Lorinda de Roulet, 95, American philanthropist.
- Jack DeJohnette, 83, American jazz drummer (Miles Davis Quintet), pianist and composer, Grammy winner (2009, 2022), congestive heart failure.
- Patrick dela Rosa, 64, Filipino actor (Ping Lacson: Super Cop), politician and businessman.
- Elisabetta Durelli, 89, Italian Olympic gymnast.
- Frank Edwards, 88, American motorsports fabricator and mechanic.
- Siham Hassan, Sudanese human rights activist and politician, member of the National Assembly of Sudan (2016–2019), shot.
- Richard Humphreys, 72, British writer.
- Olga Karasyova, 76, Kyrgyz gymnast, Olympic champion (1968).
- Akbar Kargarjam, 80, Iranian footballer (Rah Ahan, Taj, national team), cancer.
- Peter Kleibrink, 74, German Olympic handball player (1976).
- Horst Möhwald, 87, German Olympic skier.
- Francisco Moreno Barrón, 71, Mexican Roman Catholic prelate, auxiliary bishop of Morelia (2002–2008), bishop of Tlaxcala (2008–2016), and archbishop of Tijuana (since 2016), mesothelioma.
- Andrey Morev, 52, Kazakhstani footballer (Zarya Leninsk-Kuznetsky, Lokomotiv Chita, national team).
- Tidiane N'Diaye, 75, Senegalese anthropologist, economist and writer.
- Gennady Nazarov, 58, Russian actor (Assia and the Hen with the Golden Eggs, What a Wonderful Game, 72 Meters).
- Faustin Ngabu, 90, Congolese Roman Catholic prelate, bishop of Goma (1974–2010).
- José Manuel Ochotorena, 64, Spanish footballer (Real Madrid, Valencia, national team), cancer.
- Howard Olney, 91, Australian jurist and politician, Western Australian MLC (1980–1982), judge of the Supreme Court of Western Australia (1982–1988) and the Federal Court (1988–2003).
- Martin Rutledge, 71, British army major general, cancer.
- Salim Salimov, 43, Bulgarian Olympic boxer (2004), cancer.
- Helmut Sohmen, 85, Austrian-Hong Kong shipping executive, CEO of Cathay Dragon (1985–1989), chairman of BW Group (1986–2014) and MLC (1985–1988).
- Richard Stallings, 85, American politician, member of the U.S. House of Representatives (1985–1993).
- Andrew J. Stofan, 90, American engineer (NASA).
- Mihai Șubă, 78, Romanian-born Spanish chess grandmaster.
- Michael Twyman, 91, British historian.

=== 27 ===
- Barthélemy Adoukonou, 83, Beninese Roman Catholic prelate, secretary of the Pontifical Council for Culture (2009–2017).
- George Atkinson, 78, American football player (Oakland Raiders, Denver Broncos), Super Bowl champion (1977).
- Donald Bailey, 98, Australian architect (Perth Concert Hall).
- Shraga Bar, 77, Israeli footballer (Maccabi Netanya, Hapoel Ramat Gan, national team).
- Arend Bloem, 78, Dutch Olympic sprint canoer (1976).
- Marvin Brown, 42, English footballer (Bristol City, Weston-super-Mare, Salisbury City), bile duct cancer.
- Rafael Calvo Ortega, 92, Spanish politician, minister of labour (1978–1980).
- Alice Gast, 67, American chemical engineer and researcher, pancreatic cancer.
- Gunawan Paggaru, 63, Indonesian film director.
- Richard P. Guy, 93, American jurist, justice of the Washington Supreme Court (1989–2001).
- Mimmo Jodice, 91, Italian photographer.
- Vivian Jones, 68, Jamaican-born British reggae singer.
- J. D. King, 74, American artist and musician (The Coachmen).
- Caroline Litzenberger, 82, American historian and author.
- Bruce Lusignan, 88-89, American electrical engineer.
- Henry Lyons, 83, American Protestant pastor, president of the National Baptist Convention (1994–1999).
- Odd Martinsen, 82, Norwegian cross-country skier, Olympic champion (1968).
- Karimpat Mathangi Ramakrishnan, 91, Indian pediatric plastic surgeon.
- Al Nagler, 90, American optical designer and amateur astronomer.
- Daniel Polz, 68, German Egyptologist.
- Juan Salgado Brito, 77, Mexican politician, two-term deputy and mayor of Cuernavaca, Morelos (1985–1988).
- Prunella Scales, 93, English actress (Fawlty Towers, A Question of Attribution, Howards End).
- Hans Jörg Stetter, 95, German mathematician.
- Jerry Taff, 85, American anchorman (WISN-TV).
- Ruth Thorne-Thomsen, 82, American photographer, respiratory failure.
- Billy Roy Wilson, 85, American jurist, judge of the U.S. District Court for Eastern Arkansas (since 1993).

=== 28 ===
- Richard Bonnot, 67, French singer, musician, and actor (Les Charlots).
- Clyde Bradley, 91, American politician, member of the Iowa House of Representatives (1995–2003).
- David Brighty, 86, British diplomat, ambassador to Spain (1994–1998)
- Ivan Court, 78, Canadian politician, mayor of Saint John, New Brunswick (2008–2012).
- Bernard Grandmaître, 92, Canadian politician, Ontario MPP (1984–1999), Ontario minister of municipal affairs (1985–1987), and Ontario minister of revenue (1987–1989).
- Benz Hui, 76, Hong Kong actor (Running Out of Time, Bounty Lady, Line Walker), multiple organ failure.
- Ilona Kassai, 97, Hungarian actress and voice actress.
- Brian Kekovich, 79, Australian footballer (Carlton).
- Koko Komégné, 75, Cameroonian painter.
- Roger Luckin, 85, English cricketer (Essex).
- Adrian Maben, 83, British film director (Pink Floyd: Live at Pompeii).
- Mike Manley, 83, American Olympic steeplechaser (1972).
- May McGee, 81, Irish women's rights activist.
- Frans Melckenbeeck, 84, Belgian Olympic road bicycle racer (1960).
- Héctor Noguera, 88, Chilean actor (Jackal of Nahueltoro, The Compass Rose, Mr. Kaplan), cancer.
- John Smietanka, 84, American attorney, U.S. attorney for the Western District of Michigan (1981–1994).
- Alexander Tilley, 87, Canadian entrepreneur, founder of Tilley Endurables.

=== 29 ===
- Jonathon Atkinson, 57, English cricketer (Somerset, Cambridge University).
- Lise Bacon, 91, Canadian politician, deputy premier of Quebec (1985–1994), senator (1994–2009), and twice Quebec MNA.
- Konika Biswas, 80, Bangladeshi politician, MP (1973–1976).
- Arline Bronzaft, 89, American environmental psychologist.
- Charles Coste, 101, French pursuit cyclist, Olympic champion (1948).
- Günter Haritz, 77, German road and track cyclist, Olympic champion (1972), cancer.
- Bill Hickey, 89, American Olympic bobsledder (1964, 1968).
- Julius Jia Zhiguo, 90, Chinese Roman Catholic prelate, bishop of Zhengding (since 1980).
- Alvin Kass, 89, American rabbi.
- Alison Knowles, 92, American visual artist (Fluxus).
- Gavin McKiddie, 85, Scottish cricketer (national team).
- John S. Nabila, Ghanaian geographer and politician, minister of tourism (1980–1981) and president of the National House of Chiefs (2008–2016). (death announced on this date)
- Erik Paulsson, 83, Swedish construction and leisure industry executive, founder of PEAB and chairman of Skistar (since 1977).
- Maria Riva, 100, German-born American actress (The Scarlet Empress, The Burning Glass, Scrooged).
- Pierre Robert, 70, American disc jockey (WMMR).
- James Senese, 80, Italian jazz saxophonist (Napoli Centrale), singer-songwriter, and actor (No Thanks, Coffee Makes Me Nervous, Zora the Vampire), complications from pneumonia.
- Kostas Smoriginas, 72, Lithuanian actor (Nikolai Vavilov, Loss).
- Walter Sutton, 93, Canadian Olympic sprinter (1952).
- Gladys Stone Wright, 100, American band director.

=== 30 ===
- Yoqub Ahmedov, 87, Uzbek actor (The Mischievous Boy, Adventures of Ali-Baba and the Forty Thieves, The Battle of the Three Kings).
- Basil Alkazzi, 87, Kuwaiti-born British artist. (death announced on this date)
- Gerald Bezhanov, 85, Russian film director (Vitya Glushakov - A Friend of the Apaches, The Most Charming and Attractive, Where is the Nophelet?), producer and screenwriter.
- Steve Corbett, 74, American football player (New England Patriots), cancer.
- Ben Duncan, 45, British socialite and television personality (Big Brother), fall.
- Karin Glenmark, 73, Swedish singer (Gemini).
- Steve Hargan, 83, American baseball player (Cleveland Indians, Texas Rangers, Atlanta Braves).
- Marjorie Johnson, 106, American baker.
- Kiều Hưng, 88, Vietnamese singer.
- Jorunn Kjellsby, 81, Norwegian actress (Lasse & Geir, A Somewhat Gentle Man, Manhunt).
- Valentin Kuik, 82, Estonian film director and screenwriter (Keskea rõõmud, Kõrini!).
- Vincent Malerba, 100, French resistance member and Buchenwald concentration camp survivor.
- Erik Marchand, 70, French singer and musician.
- Juan Matta-Ballesteros, 80, Honduran drug trafficker and convicted murderer.
- Peter McConnell, 80, Australian cricket umpire.
- Yoervis Medina, 37, Venezuelan baseball player (Seattle Mariners, Chicago Cubs, Draci Brno), heart attack.
- Anatoly Menshchikov, 75, Russian actor.
- Burt Meyer, 99, American toy inventor (Rock 'Em Sock 'Em Robots, Lite-Brite, Mouse Trap).
- Pentti Nikula, 86, Finnish Olympic pole vaulter (1964).
- Enea Piccinelli, 98, Italian politician, deputy (1963–1983).
- Klaus Scharioth, 79, German diplomat, ambassador to the United States (2006–2011).
- Scott Sorry, 47, American rock musician and songwriter (The Wildhearts, Sorry and the Sinatras, Amen), brain cancer.
- Akinloye Tofowomo, 50, Nigerian singer-songwriter.
- Alan Vest, 86, English-born New Zealand football player (Perth Azzurri, New Zealand national team) and manager (Sarawak FA).
- Peter Watkins, 90, English filmmaker (The War Game, Punishment Park, Resan), Oscar winner (1967).
- Catherine Waynick, 76, American Anglican bishop.
- Rafał Wójcik, 53, Polish Olympic long-distance runner (2000).
- Luis Zubero, 77, Spanish Olympic road racing cyclist (1968).

=== 31 ===
- Colin Addison, 85, English football player (Nottingham Forest, Sheffield United) and manager (Hereford United).
- Björn Alkeby, 73, Swedish footballer (Djurgården).
- Rajesh Banik, 40, Indian cricketer (Tripura).
- C. Arlen Beam, 95, American jurist, judge of the U.S. District Court for the District of Nebraska (1981–1987) and the U.S. Court of Appeals for the Eighth Circuit (since 1987).
- Engin Çağlar, 85, Turkish actor (Yaşamak Ne Güzel Şey), traffic collision.
- Earl Cochran, 44, American football player (Houston Texans, Green Bay Packers).
- W. George Cross, 92, Canadian politician, Newfoundland and Labrador MHA (1975–1979, 1982–1985).
- Pierre Dufault, 90, Canadian journalist and sports commentator.
- Francesca Duranti, 90, Italian writer.
- Manuel Frederick, 78, Indian field hockey player, Olympic bronze medallist (1972).
- Stanley Fung, 80, Hong Kong-Taiwanese actor (Lucky Stars).
- George Gilbody, 70, British Olympic boxer (1980).
- Adam Greenberg, 88, Israeli-American cinematographer (The Terminator, Ghost, Rush Hour).
- Slobodanka Gruden, 85, Serbian politician, mayor of Belgrade (1992–1994).
- Tchéky Karyo, 72, Turkish-born French actor (The Missing, La Femme Nikita, La Balance), cancer.
- Daniel Krištof, 46, Czech psychologist and organisational manager, pancreatic cancer.
- Leo Leandros, 102, Greek singer and lyricist.
- Mel Leipzig, 90, American painter and educator.
- Johannes Linßen, 76, German football player (MSV Duisburg, SC Fortuna Köln) and manager (SC Fortuna Köln).
- Neil MacGonigill, 77, Canadian music promoter, manager and record label owner.
- Armand Mattelart, 89, Belgian sociologist.
- Ramdarash Mishra, 101, Indian poet and writer.
- Jim Mundy, 91, American singer-songwriter.
- Fatos Nano, 73, Albanian politician, prime minister (1991, 1997–1998, 2002–2005), chronic obstructive pulmonary disease.
- Elżbieta Penderecka, 77, Polish cultural activist.
- Ieuan Rees, 84, Welsh stone carver and calligrapher.
- Francisco Rojas Gutiérrez, 81, Mexican politician, two-term deputy and director of Petróleos Mexicanos (1987–1994).
- Eike Wilm Schulte, 86, German operatic baritone (Hessisches Staatstheater Wiesbaden).
- Ton Schulten, 87, Dutch painter.
- Jed Steele, 80, American winemaker, bladder cancer.
- Willie Young, 73, Scottish footballer (Aberdeen, Arsenal, Nottingham Forest).
