= Filomeno Biagio Tatò =

Italian politician (1939–2025)

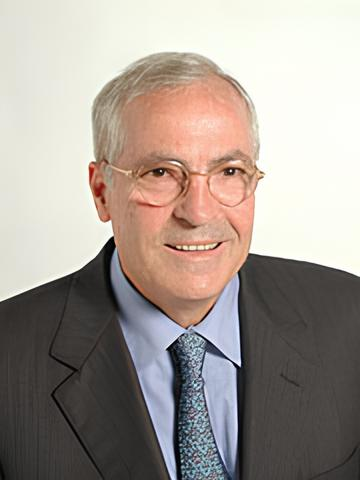
- Tatò in 2001

Member of the Senate of the Republic of Italy for Andria
- In office 17 May 2001 – 28 April 2006

Personal details
- Born: 3 February 1939 Barletta, Italy
- Died: 6 October 2025 (aged 86)
- Political party: AN
- Occupation: Doctor

Filomeno Biagio Tatò (3 February 1939 – 6 October 2025) was an Italian politician. A member of the National Alliance, he served in the Senate of the Republic from 2001 to 2006.

Tatò died on 6 October 2025, at the age of 86.
