= Alain Roger =

French philosopher and writer (1936–2025)

Alain
- Born: 6 November 1936
- Died: 7 October 2025 (aged 88)
- Education: École normale supérieure
- Occupations: Philosopher, writer

Alain Roger (French: [alɛ̃ ʁɔʒe]; 6 November 1936 – 7 October 2025) was a French philosopher and writer.

== Life and career ==
Roger studied under Gilles Deleuze at the École normale supérieure before becoming a professor at Blaise Pascal University. He was most well-known for declaring that "every landscape is a product of art".

Roger died on 7 October 2025, at the age of 88.

== Publications ==
=== Studies ===
- Nus et paysages. Essai sur la fonction de l'art (1978)
- Maîtres et protecteurs de la nature (1991)
- La théorie du paysage en France, 1974-1994 (1995)
- Court traité du paysage (1997)

=== Essays ===
- Le roman contemporain (1973)
- Proust. Les Plaisirs et les Noms (1981)
- Hérésies du Désir. Freud, Dracula, Dali (1986)
- L’Art d’aimer, ou la fascination de la féminité (1995)
- Art et anticipation (1995)
- Le vocabulaire de Schopenhauer (1999)
- La vie en vert (2004)
- Bréviaire de la bêtise (2008)
- Par delà le vrai et le faux (2016)

=== Novels ===
- Jérusalem ! Jérusalem ! (1969)
- Le Misogyne (1976)
- Hermaphrodite (1977)
- Le Voyeur ivre (1981)
- La Travestie (1987)
- Rémission (1990)
