= Gunawan Paggaru =

Indonesian film director (1962–2025)

Gunawan Paggaru (17 June 1962 – 27 October 2025) was an Indonesian film director. He was chairman of the Indonesian Film Board from 2022 until his death on 27 October 2025, at the age of 63.
