= Hugues Puel =

French economist and priest (1932–2025)

- Born: 27 April 1932; Bordeaux, France
- Died: 5 October 2025 (aged 93); Paris, France
- Education: University of Bordeaux
- Occupations: Economist; priest

Hugues Puel (French: [yg pjɛl]; 27 April 1932 – 5 October 2025) was a French economist and priest.

After his studies at the University of Bordeaux, Puel joined the priesthood in 1956 and joined the association Économie et humanisme, founded by fellow Dominican Louis-Joseph Lebret. He also had a daily column in the newspaper La Croix.

Puel died in Paris on 5 October 2025, at the age of 93.

== Works ==
- Le problème du chômage aux États-Unis (1968)
- Chômage et capitalismes contemporains (1971)
- Les économistes radicaux aux USA (1974)
- Les Paradoxes de l’économie – L'éthique au défi (1995)
- L'économie au défi de l'éthique (1997)
- Économie et humanisme dans le mouvement de la modernité (2004)
- Une éthique pour l'économie : Ethos, crises, choix (2010)
- Pour une anthropologie économique, Toulouse (2014)
