= Peter Kleibrink =

German handball player (1951–2025)

Peter Kleibrink (12 April 1951 – 26 October 2025) was a West German handball player who competed in the 1976 Summer Olympics. In 1976 he was part of the West German team which finished fourth in the Olympic tournament. He played all six matches and scored six goals.
