= Borys Fuksman =

Businessman and media investor (1946/1947–2025)

- Борис Фуксман
- Born: 1946 or 1947
- Died: 9 October 2025 (aged 78)
- Other names: Boris Fuchsman
- Occupation: Businessman
- Known for: Co-founding 1+1
- Relatives: Alexander Rodnyansky (cousin)

Borys Fuksman (1946 or 1947 – 9 October 2025), also transliterated as Boris Fuchsman, was a Ukrainian-born German businessman best known as a co-founder of the Ukrainian television channel 1+1. He also held honorary leadership roles within Ukrainian Jewish civic organizations.

== Early life and education ==
Fuksman was a cousin of filmmaker and producer Alexander Rodnyansky. He completed studies at the Kyiv Trade and Economic Institute in 1970. After graduation, he worked for four years as an assistant cameraman at the Kyiv Documentary Film Studio. In 1974, he emigrated with his family to Germany, where he later established himself as an entrepreneur.

== Career ==
Following his move to Germany, Fuksman founded an art gallery in Düsseldorf and developed business interests that later intersected with film production and media. In 1990, he returned to Ukraine with Rodnyansky to create the production company Innova Film and later founded 1+1 TV channel. Over the subsequent decade, he and Rodnyansky sold their holdings in the channel in stages to Central European Media Enterprises.

Fuksman and Rodnyansky also co-founded the Cinema City chain of multiplexes in Ukraine. They were also among the owners behind the Hilton Kyiv hotel project that opened in the early 2010s, and Fuksman later discussed further capital plans tied to potential gaming legalization. He remained active as an investor and producer while maintaining his principal residence in Germany.

Fuksman also held honorary leadership positions within the Jewish Confederation of Ukraine.

== Death ==
Fuksman died on 9 October 2025, at the age of 78.
