= Hernán Damiani =

Argentine politician (1959–2025)

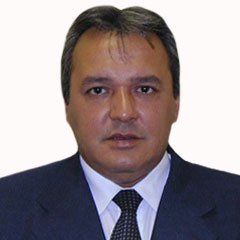
- Damiani in 2001

Member of the Argentine Chamber of Deputies
- In office 10 December 2001 – 10 December 2005

Personal details
- Born: Hernán Norberto Luis Damiani; 1959 Posadas, Argentina
- Died: 15 October 2025 (aged 65–66) Posadas, Argentina
- Party: UCR
- Education: National University of the Northeast
- Occupation: Lawyer

Hernán Norberto Luis Damiani (1960 – 15 October 2025) was an Argentine politician. A member of the Radical Civic Union, he served in the Chamber of Deputies from 2001 to 2005.

Damiani died from a heart attack in Posadas, on 15 October 2025, at the age of 66.
