= Natana Kasinathan =

Indian historian (1940–2025)

- Born: Kasinathan; 1 November 1940; Thoppalikuppam, South Arcot, Madras Province, British India
- Died: 6 October 2025 (aged 84)
- Occupations: Archaeologist, author
- Known for: Researching Tamil civilization

Natana Kasinathan (1 November 1940 – 6 October 2025) was an Indian historian, archaeologist, author and epigraphist who is known for his work on inscriptions of Tamil Nadu. He graduated from University of Madras in 1967. He served as the Director of the Tamil Nadu Archaeology Department, Government of Tamil Nadu. He is credited with reviving the inscriptions relating to early Tamil civilizations. Kasinathan died on 6 October 2025, at the age of 84.

== Discoveries ==
Rock Art at Mallachandram.

== Journals ==
- Date of Early Tamil Epigraphs
- Kumarikkandam and Harappan Civilization
- The Unknown Sanskrit Poets of Pallava, Pandya, Chola Periods
- The Role of Shepherds Through The Ages
- Kala : The journal of Indian Art History Congress 5 (1998–1999)
- Kalvettu, Journal of Tamil Nadu State Department of Archeology

== Books ==
- Ancient Industries of Tamil Nadu
- Thamizhar Panpattu Sitharalgal
- Vanniyar Varalaru II (History of Vanniyars Volume II)
- Thamizhar Kasu Iyal
- Hero Stones in Tamilnadu
- Tamils Heritage
- Thonmai Thamizhum Thonmai Thamizharurum
- Samana Thadayam
- Muthil Mugizhdha Mutharaiyar
