= László Örvendi =

Hungarian engineer and politician (1951–2025)

Member of the National Assembly
- In office 16 May 2006 – 5 May 2014

Personal details
- Born: 1951 Hajdúszoboszló, Hungary
- Died: 1 October 2025 (aged 74)
- Party: Fidesz (2005–2025)
- Other political affiliations: FKGP (2001–2005)
- Profession: Agrarian engineer, politician

László József Örvendi (1951 – 1 October 2025) was a Hungarian politician who was a member of the National Assembly (MP) from Fidesz Hajdú-Bihar County Regional List between 2006 and 2014.

== Life and career ==
Örvendi was born in 1951. He was a member of the presidium of the National Alliance of Hungarian Farmers (MAGOSZ). He joined Independent Smallholders, Agrarian Workers and Civic Party (FKGP) in 2001. He became a member of the General Assembly of Hajdú-Bihar County in 2002. Later he joined Fidesz. He was a member of the Committee on Agriculture from 30 May 2006 to 13 May 2010. After the 2010 parliamentary election, he was elected a member of the Committee on Consumer Protection on 14 May 2010. Örvendi died on 1 October 2025, at the age of 74.
