= Franck Leblanc =

French horse trainer and jockey (1971–2025)

- Born: 1971; Évron, France
- Died: 12 October 2025 (aged 54)
- Occupations: Horse trainer Jockey

Franck Leblanc (French: [fʁɑ̃k ləblɑ̃]; 1971 – 12 October 2025) was a French horse trainer and jockey.

Leblanc notably coached Up and Quick, the winner of the Prix d'Amérique in 2015. In June 2020, he obtained his 2000th victory in France.

Leblanc died on 12 October 2025, at the age of 54.
