= Ramatou Baba Moussa =

Beninese politician (died 2025)

Minister of Social Protection and Women's Affairs
- Appointed by: Mathieu Kérékou

Member of the National Assembly of Benin
- In office 1991–1995

Personal details
- Died: 18 October 2025

Ramatou Baba Moussa (died 18 October 2025) was a Beninese politician.

Moussa served in the first legislature of the National Assembly and was one of three women out of the 64 deputies. On 26 May 1998, she was named Minister of Social Protection and Women's Affairs by President Mathieu Kérékou. She was one of three women in his cabinet.

Moussa died on 18 October 2025.
