= Choi Chang-gyu =

South Korean politician (1937–2025)

- 최창규

Member of the National Assembly of South Korea
- In office 11 April 1981 – 29 May 1988

Personal details
- Born: 23 June 1937 Cheongyang County, Korea, Japan
- Died: 20 October 2025 (aged 88)
- Political party: DJP
- Education: Seoul National University (BA, MA)
- Occupation: Academic

Choi Chang-gyu (Korean: 최창규; 23 June 1937 – 20 October 2025) was a South Korean politician. A member of the Democratic Justice Party, he served in the National Assembly from 1981 to 1988.

Choi died on 20 October 2025, at the age of 88.
