= Kyriakos D. Kassis =

Greek poet and painter (1946–2025)

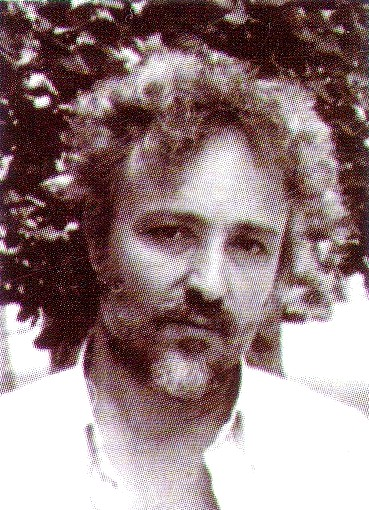
Kyriakos Kassis

Kyriakos D. Kassis (Greek: Κυριάκος Δ. Κάσσης; March 1946 – 13 October 2025) was a Greek poet and painter. He studied at the Legal Faculty of the University of Athens, in the department of Law, Political, and Economic studies, and in the Stavrakou Faculty, for the art of cinema and film making. He lectured abroad in Germany, France, India, Australia, Istanbul, Sofia, and Bucharest.

== Life and career ==
Kyriakos Kassis was born in the Palyro of Mani, and raised in the land of Laconia. In 1958, at the age of twelve, he went to Athens in order to continue his education. In 1964, he joined the Legal Faculty of the University of Athens (Legal, Political and Economic Study). Between 1971 and 1973 he attended the Stavrakou Faculty for film making (studying Script and Directing), as well as concerning the art of Greek animation. He also attended in 1978 seminars concerning the preservation of fresco and wall paintings. In 1970 he had a role in the editing of the historical dictionary of the Academy of Athens. Kassis donated a part of his linguistic research regarding the dialect of Mani to the linguistic arm of the Academy of Athens.

As of 2013, Kassis had made two discographic works: Maniatika, in 1980 for the Lyra company; and Doric Odes in 1999, in which Alkistis Protopsalti and Nikolas Mitsovoleas sang vocals. In these songs, the music and lyric frame Kassis' Mani municipal identity, some of the songs being entirely his own.

Kassis died on 13 October 2025, at the age of 79.

== Bibliography ==
Poetry – Theatre

1. (1968). "Liokaris". p80. Publications: Ihoe (reprints: 1974, 1980, 1986, 1990, 1996)
2. (1975). "Poems A". p80.
3. (1975). "Poetry 7". Publications: Kastanioti
4. (1985). "Am'agalmata". p64.
5. (1986). "The theatre in the Mountain" – Unknown Comedies. p160.
6. (1983). "Sappho'". p56.
7. (1983). "Hipparchus, the cynic philosopher". p56.
8. (1992). "Iva'smata". p48.
9. (1999). "Orfalwn". p142.
10. (1999). "Kyrikos". p50.
11. (2000). "The Big Greek Erotologion". p312.
12. (2004). "Forgotten or Unknown genuine heroes and heroines of the Greek revolution 1821–1827". Twenty four theatrical plays of argued history. p320.
13. (2005). "The Conquest of Rhodes from the Ottomans in 1522"
14. (2007). "Othellos apologizes". Comedy in 1.100 verses.
15. (2007). "Jesus".
16. (2010). "GREEK-BIBLE". p688. Publisher: A.P.E.L.L.A of Greeks.

History

1. (1982). "The thieves – Ntavelis".
2. (1998). "The genuine and inside history of Hellenism", volume 1. p372.
3. (2000). " The genuine and inside history of Hellenism", volume 2. p304.
4. (2000). "Antiauthoritarians and Thieves in the mountains of Greece", volume 1. p368.
5. (2000). "Atlantis: The truth for the lost Continent". p288.
6. (2000). "Prehistory of Mediterranean: Ancient Populations and Hellenism". p288.
7. (2000). "Sparta – Athens, Truths and Lies". p288
8. (2007). "Jesus was Greek"
9. (1981) "The Greek Folklore Fiction". Volume 1. p118.
10. (1983) "The Greek Folklore Fiction". Volume 2. p210.
11. (1983). "Sotiris Christidis, the great folklore painter". p32.
12. (1985). "The Written Karagkiozis". p48.
13. (1985). "The Alter-Literature in Greece". p186.
14. (1998). "Greek Alter-Literature and Comicbooks". p208.

For the Folklore Culture – History – Language etc. of Mani

1. (1977). "History of Mani". p180. (reprints 1978, 1980, 1983, 1990)
2. (1978/1979). "Genealogies or Clans In Mani". p68.
3. (1979). "Berlina of Maniaton"
4. (1979). "Funeral Songs of Mani". Volume 1. p512.
5. (1980). "Funeral Songs of Mani". Volume 2. p416.
6. (1981). "Funeral Songs of Mani of the 20th century – Interwar – Axis Occupation – Civil War and recent history" Volume 3. p368.
7. (1980). "Folklore of Inside Mani – Material life". Volume 1. p304.
8. (1981). “Folklore of Inside Mani – Intellectual Life". Volume 2. p224.
9. (1981). "Folklore speech in Mani, Proverbs – Figures of Speech – Καταφωνήσεις". Volume 3. p280.
10. (1982). "The linguistic idiom of Mani – Study". p80.
11. (1982). " The linguistic idiom of Mani – the Dictionary". p408.
12. (1982). "The forgotten and unknown old-maniatic dance (hellenic), ancestor of Syrtou". p32.
13. (1983). "Folklore Speech in Mani, Magarotragouda – Ksesteroglossimata – Conundrums, etc". Volume 2. p36.
14. (1983). "Satires of Mani". p372.
15. (1983). "125 Fairy Tales of Mani". p340.
16. (1983). "Folklore Sculpture in Mani". p140.
17. (1984). "Satiric Logos in the Mani". p192.
18. (1985). "Depictions and Paintings'". p64.
19. (1985). "The songs and elegies of Southern Peloponnese (Mani – Taygetos – Parnonas)". Volume 1. p436.
20. (1985). "Anecdotes of real persons". p414.
21. (1988). "Flowers of Stone". p254.
22. (1990). "Flowers of Stone-the pre-medieval, medieval and more recent families and churches in Mani". p550.
23. (1993). "64 Fairy Tales of Mani". p168.
24. (1993). "Weaponry and fighting condition of people of Mani during the Ottoman domination". p10
25. (1993). "Supernatural Phenomena: Pretexts, Ghosts etc ". (Authentic Narrations). p48
26. (1997). "The cultural presence of Lakonia in the human culture"
27. (1998). "Exploits and lousier"
28. (1998). "Two hundred Logografoi from Mani". p192.
29. (2000). "Legends of Tainarou". p352.
30. (2006). "The Ancient-Greek ancestry of Koulourianoi". p192.
31. (2007). "The Family Tagarouljas – Krialakos of Mani". p80.
32. (2008). "Fairy Tales of Mani", Volume 3. p580.
33. (2008). "My Own Fairy tales". p112.
