= Josias Gasser =

Swiss politician (1952–2025)

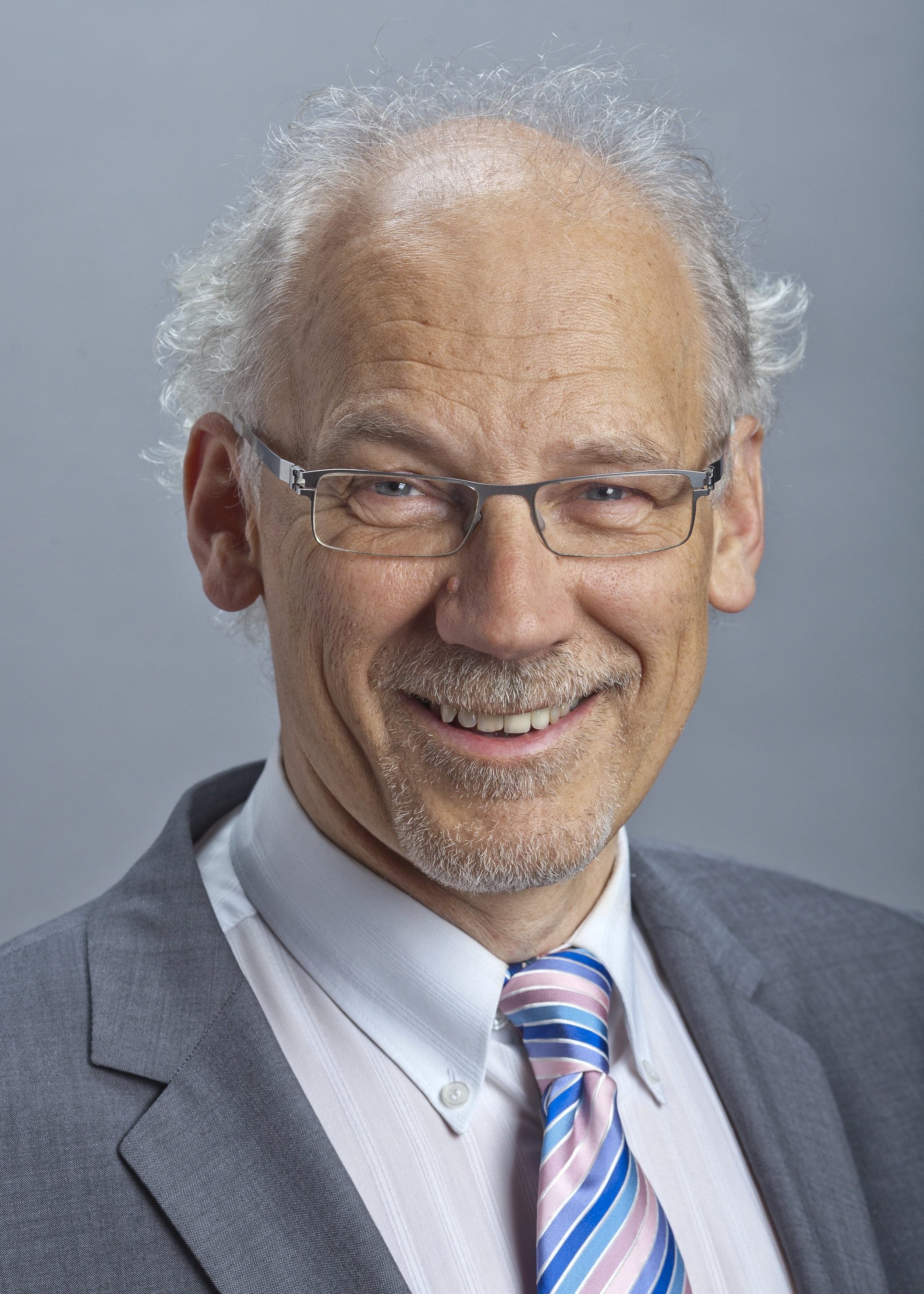
- Gasser in 2011

Member of the Swiss National Council
- In office 5 December 2011 – 29 November 2015

Personal details
- Born: 17 November 1952 Zurich, Switzerland
- Died: 9 October 2025 (aged 72)
- Party: GLP
- Occupation: Entrepreneur

Josias Gasser (17 November 1952 – 9 October 2025) was a Swiss politician. A member of the Green Liberal Party, he served in the National Council from 2011 to 2015.

Gasser died on 9 October 2025, at the age of 72.
