= Vera Jarach =

Italian-Argentine human rights activist (1928–2025)

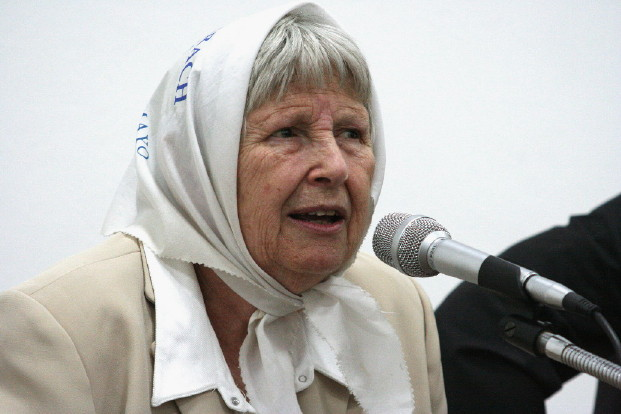
Vera Vigevani de Jarach

Vera Vigevani de Jarach (5 March 1928 – 3 October 2025) was an Italian-Argentine human rights activist. She was a member of the Mothers of Plaza de Mayo, an organization she joined after her daughter was kidnapped on 25 June 1976. Until her last days, she remained active in raising awareness about the Holocaust and denouncing the crimes against humanity committed by the military dictatorship in Argentina.

She was born in Milan into a Jewish Italian family, and in 1939 she fled to Argentina with her relatives to escape the growing persecution under the Italian racial laws.

In Buenos Aires, while helping other Jewish Italian refugees, she met Giorgio Jarach, whom she later married. They had a daughter named Franca, who was kidnapped and detained at the ESMA.

De Jarach died in Buenos Aires on 3 October 2025, at the age of 97.
