= Japanese (Panamanian singer) =

- Born: March 9, 1973; Colón, Panama
- Died: October 23, 2025 (aged 52) Colón, Panama
- Genres: Pop, hip hop
- Occupations: Singer, rapper, songwriter, producer
- Years active: 1990–20??

Leavitt Eduardo Zambrano Haynes (March 9, 1973 – October 23, 2025), better known as Japanese, was a Panamanian reggae en español and dancehall singer. He was a founding member of the group Scare Dem Crew.

== Biography ==
He began his musical career in 1987, but didn't officially record until 1999, when he recorded the track "Invisible" on the album Pesadilla Vol. 2. In 2000, he joined the Scare Dem Crew, collaborating with the other members. While initially he often appeared on Danger Man's songs and vice versa, he has since achieved his own hits, though collaborations remain an important part of his repertoire. He collaborated with Flex on the track "Eras una niña," released on the various artists compilation Chalice (2000), which Flex later included on his CD Te Quiero: Romantic Style In Da World (2007).

In 2005, Japanese became involved in the rivalry between Mr. Fox and the Just Do It Clan against Danger Man. This rivalry helped Japanese achieve a significant turning point in his artistic career with one of his most important songs. His lyrical style, unlike Danger Man's, is much more complex. His lyrics often deal with life in the ghetto, social and personal problems, and a more irreverent logic in his rhymes—a style rarely explored in Panama. Musically, he sang in hip-hop and dancehall rhythms.

== Everyday life ==
His final years were marked by severe health complications. In 2020, he suffered a stroke that forced him to retire from his artistic career. In mid-2024, he had a leg amputated as a result of diabetes.

He died on October 23, 2025, at the Manuel Amador Guerrero Hospital in his hometown of Colón, after several weeks hospitalized due to complications from diabetes.

== Discography ==
- 2004: El CD
- 2005: Don Víctor Corleone
- 2005: Entre Dos Mundos
- 2015: Crime Family
