= Klara Hallik =

Estonian politician (1933–2025)

Klara Hallik (24 April 1933 – 11 October 2025) was an Estonian politician and political scientist. She was born in Leningrad Oblast on 24 April 1933. In 1992, she was Minister of National Relations (Estonian: rahvussuhete minister). In 2001, she took part in the public appeal "Two Estates" by Estonian social scientists concerned about the development of Estonian society. Hallik died on 11 October 2025, at the age of 92.
