= Pesi Fonua =

Tongan journalist (1947–2025)

- Born: 24 August 1947
- Died: 12 October 2025 (aged 78); Nukuʻalofa, Tonga
- Occupation: Journalist

Pesi Siale Fonua (24 August 1947 – 12 October 2025) was a Tongan journalist and publisher of Matangi Tonga.

Fonua launched Vava'u Press Limited with his wife, Mary, in 1979. He became editor-in-chief of Matangi Tonga, one of the primary independent newspapers in Tonga. He also led the newspaper to be one of the primary news outlets for the Tongan diaspora.

Fonua died at Vaiola Hospital in Nukuʻalofa on 12 October 2025, at the age of 78.
