= Joy Matter =

Swiss politician (1935–2025)

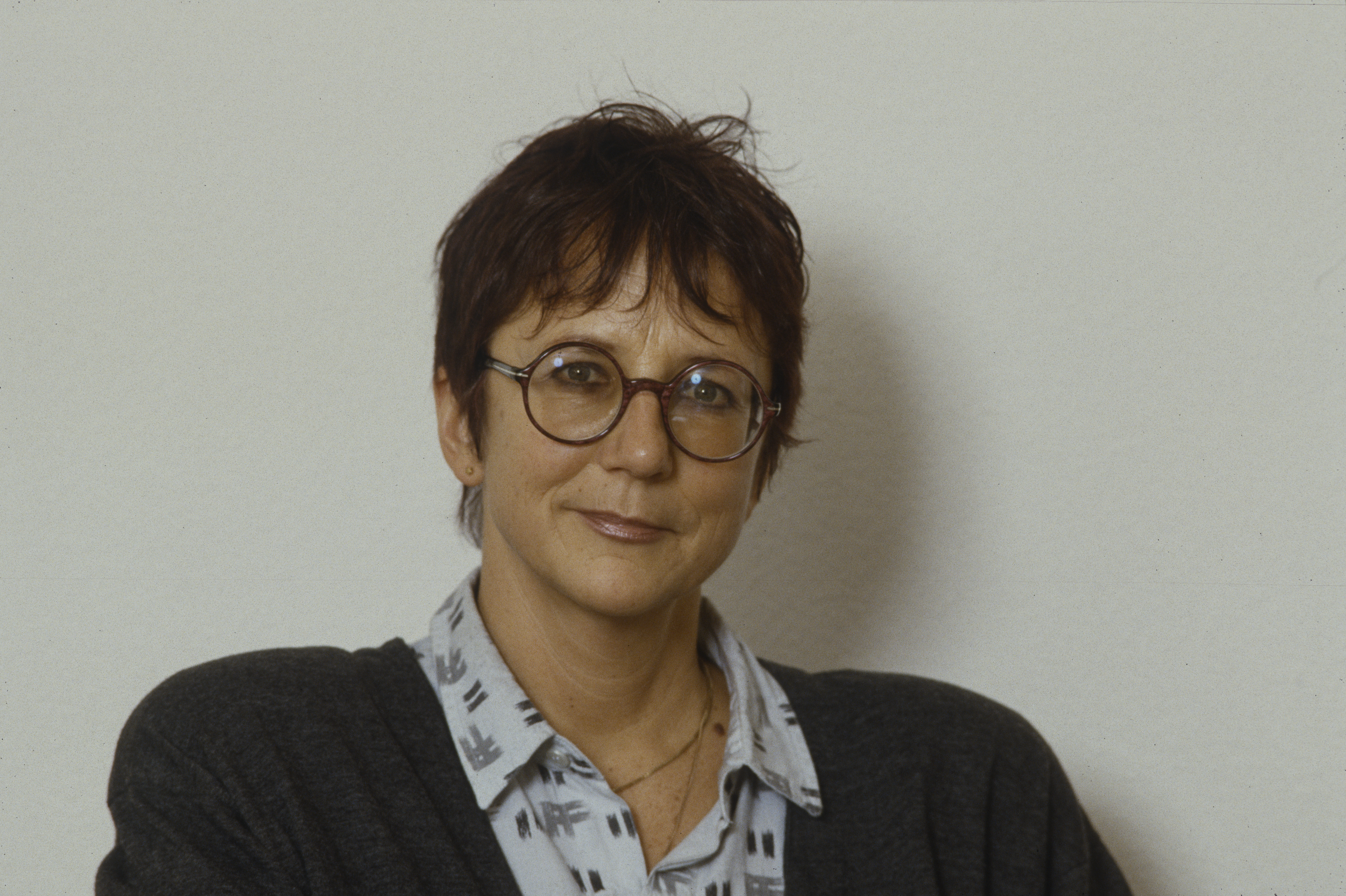
- Matter c. 1990

Member of the Grand Council of Bern
- In office 1978–1988

Personal details
- Born: 7 October 1935
- Died: 8 October 2025 (aged 90)
- Political party: Green
- Occupation: Schoolteacher

Joy Matter (7 October 1935 – 8 October 2025) was a Swiss politician. A member of the Green Party, she served in the Grand Council of Bern from 1978 to 1988.

Matter died on 8 October 2025, at the age of 90.
