= Nikolai Yegorov (politician, born 1941) =

Russian politician (1941–2025)

- Николай Егоров

Member of the Federation Council of Russia
- In office January 1994 – January 1996

Personal details
- Born: Nikolai Sergeevich Yegorov; 10 August 1941 Karabanovo, Ivanovo Oblast, Russian SFSR, USSR
- Died: 6 October 2025 (aged 84)
- Education: Ivanovo State Agricultural Academy

Nikolai Sergeevich Yegorov (Russian: Николай Сергеевич Егоров; 10 August 1941 – 6 October 2025) was a Russian politician. He served in the Federation Council from 1994 to 1996.

Yegorov died on 6 October 2025, at the age of 84.
