= Robert Mailman and Walter Gillespie =

Canadian exonerated men

Robert Mailman (March 14, 1948 – October 9, 2025) and Walter Gillespie (August 31, 1943 – April 19, 2024) were two Canadian men from Saint John, New Brunswick who were wrongfully convicted and sentenced for the 1983 murder of George Gilman Leeman. On January 4, 2024, they were acquitted of second degree murder after having their case overturned.

== Background ==
Robert Mailman and Walter Gillespie were "drinking buddies" from Saint John. In 1977, Mailman, who also went by "Bobby", was acquitted from being charged with attempted murder against a Saint John Police Force officer.

== Murder of George Gilman Leeman ==
George Gilman Leeman was a mechanic who later worked as a plumber in Saint John. On November 30, 1983, his charred remains were found in the woods at Rockwood Park; he had been struck in the head, with his body being dumped in the park and engulfed in flames.

== Arrests, convictions and sentencing ==
On January 18, 1984, John Loeman Jr., a 16-year-old boy, claimed to authorities that he had witnessed the murder take place. According to Loeman, he claimed that he had witnessed a woman named Janet Shatford use an axe to strike Leeman and saw Mailman use a shotgun to strike him in the head. Loeman also claimed that Gillespie was also present, holding a gasoline-contained container. The following day, Gillespie and Shatford were arrested and charged with second-degree murder. Shatford confessed and pled guilty to manslaughter as part of a plea bargain that saw her testify against Mailman and Gillespie. Loeman knew the three accused and had previously worked for Shatford as a babysitter; Gillespie was a previous boyfriend of Shatford's.

The first trial against Mailman and Gillespie, which took place during March 1984, resulted in a hung jury. During the following May, a new trial resulted in both of them receiving a life imprisonment sentence for second-degree murder. Shatford was sent to a women's prison, where she served three years before being released. The only evidence used against Mailman and Gillespie were the testimonies from Loeman and Shatford.

== Exoneration ==
During imprisonment, Mailman and Gillespie used their funds toward a polygraph conducted by expert Stuart Ryder. Both Mailman and Gillespie beat the polygraph examination, which took place on September 23, 1992.

Mailman and Gillespie were eventually released on parole after spending 18 and 21 years in prison, respectively. In 2018, Innocence Canada filed a request for the Department of Justice to review the case. Those who previously gave witness testimonies later retracted their claims and admitted to giving false testimonies. Additionally, the Saint John Police Force had paid Loeman during the trial. On January 4, 2024, both men were acquitted of their charges. In February 2024, the provincial government and both men reached an undisclosed settlement for the wrongful convictions.

Both Mailman and Gillespie's freedom as innocent men were short-lived; Gillespie died in his apartment at the age of 80 on April 19, 2024, just over three months after being exonerated. Mailman died on October 9, 2025, after succumbing to terminal liver cancer.
