= Bonette Élombe =

Congolese teacher and social media influencer (1988–2025)

- Born: 1988
- Died: 20 October 2025 (aged 36–37); Kinshasa, Democratic Republic of the Congo
- Occupation: Teacher

Bonette Élombe (1988 – 20 October 2025) was a Congolese teacher and social media influencer.

== Life and career ==
Born in 1988, Élombe taught primary school in Kalamu. She became viral on TikTok for her teaching videos, amassing over one million followers with her "méthode Élombe", which involved rhythm, play, and dance into reading, writing, and math. In addition to the fact that her practices were adopted by several other teachers in the DR Congo and Africa, she advocated for the rehabilitation of the Protestant school in Yolo Sud, where she worked. She was considered a pioneer in the use of social media for education purposes in the DR Congo.

Élombe died on 20 October 2025, which prompted condolences from Prime Minister Judith Suminwa.
