= Michel Zaoui =

French human rights lawyer (1945–2025)

- Born: 30 May 1945
- Died: 13 October 2025 (aged 80); Paris, France
- Occupation: Lawyer

Michel Zaoui (French: [miʃɛl zawi]; 30 May 1945 – 13 October 2025) was a French human rights lawyer.

Zaoui was one of the few people to have participated in the trials of Klaus Barbie, Paul Touvier, and Maurice Papon, having been admitted to the Paris Bar Association in 1969.

Zaoui died in Paris on 13 October 2025, at the age of 80.

== Works ==
- "Après le procès Papon. Questions sur un verdict" (1998)
- La signature du crime contre l'humanité (2002)
- Mémoires de justice. Barbie, Touvier, Papon (2009)
- Hommage à Rita Thalmann (2014)
