= Charles S. Tobias =

Entrepreneur and sailor

Charles S. Tobias (April 23, 1934 – October 14, 2025) was a Canadian-American entrepreneur, United States Marine Corps aviator, filmmaker, and the founder of Pusser's Rum. In 1979, he obtained the original rum blending recipe from the British Admiralty to produce and sell the spirit commercially, establishing a brand that became closely associated with maritime culture and the British Virgin Islands. For his contributions to the economy and tourism of the British Virgin Islands, he was appointed a Member of the Order of the British Empire (MBE) in 2011.

== Early life and education ==
Tobias was born on April 23, 1934, in Canada. As a youth, he was a competitive runner and set a Canadian schoolboy record by running a mile in 4 minutes and 6 seconds. This athletic achievement earned him a scholarship to the University of Southern California (USC) in the United States. At USC, Tobias graduated with dual bachelor's degrees in aeronautical and mechanical engineering.

== Military service and early career ==
Following his graduation from USC, Tobias enlisted in the United States Marine Corps. He was selected for fighter pilot training in Pensacola, Florida, and subsequently served two tours during the Vietnam War. He flew missions off aircraft carriers and conducted special operations ashore flying T-28 aircraft. During his second tour, his aircraft was shot down over the Mekong Delta, and he was successfully rescued by Navy SEALs.

After concluding his military service, Tobias relocated to Santa Monica, California, where he entered the technology sector. He founded Veradyne, Inc., a company focused on developing silicon transistors and radar-jamming technology intended to counter surface-to-air missiles. He eventually merged the enterprise with Fairchild Semiconductor.

== Sailing and The Way of the Wind ==
In 1971, seeking a change from his corporate lifestyle, Tobias sold his business interests and purchased the Mar, a 57-foot wooden ketch built for icy waters, from aviator and author Ernest K. Gann. Departing from Los Angeles, he embarked on a five-year global circumnavigation. His crew included three other sailors and two unconventional animal companions: a chimpanzee named Tommy and a cheetah named Fifi.

The voyage took the Mar south along the Pacific coast, through the Panama Canal, and across the Atlantic Ocean into the Mediterranean Sea. Tobias explored ancient ruins in the Greek islands of Delos and Mykonos, eventually fulfilling a childhood dream by reaching Kapi Cove and Cleopatra Island in Asia Minor.

Tobias documented this journey and subsequently wrote, directed, narrated, and produced a documentary film titled The Way of the Wind. The 104-minute film, released in December 1976, was acquired and funded in part by Paramount Studios. It showcased the crew's offshore adventures, including scuba diving shipwrecks, interacting with dolphins, and navigating perilous ocean elements.

== Pusser's Rum ==
Around 1977, while sailing near Gibraltar, Tobias experienced an equipment failure and sought a replacement part from a visiting Royal Navy ship. During this encounter, a naval captain gifted him a flagon of the traditional rum issued to British sailors. The Royal Navy had officially discontinued its daily rum ration (known as the "tot") in 1970, an event referred to in naval history as Black Tot Day.

Inspired by the history of the spirit, Tobias lobbied the British Admiralty for the rights to the original blending recipe and permission to use the White Ensign on his commercial packaging. In 1979, he formally established Pusser's Rum Ltd., basing its operations in the British Virgin Islands. The term "Pusser" is Royal Navy slang for a purser, the officer historically responsible for distributing the rum ration aboard ships. As part of his ongoing agreement with the Admiralty, Tobias committed a royalty from the company's global sales to The Sailors' Fund, a charity supporting active-duty naval personnel.

Beyond the bottling operation in Tortola, Tobias expanded the brand into a wider hospitality and retail business. He opened several nautical-themed Pusser's restaurants and stores in the Caribbean, the United States, and Europe. Under his direction, the company also successfully trademarked the "Painkiller" cocktail, a famous tropical drink originally created in the Virgin Islands.

Tobias eventually sold the rum brand but retained ownership of his other Pusser's-affiliated business interests until 2021.

== Personal life and death ==
In 2011, Tobias was appointed a Member of the Order of the British Empire (MBE) by Queen Elizabeth II, an honor recognizing his long-term contributions to the economy and culture of the British Virgin Islands.

He and his wife of 37 years, Joanna, relocated to Vero Beach, Florida, in 2021. Tobias died at his home in Vero Beach on October 14, 2025, at the age of 91.
