= Roger Luckin =

English cricketer (1939–2025)

Personal information
- Full name: Roger Alfred Geoffrey Luckin
- Born: 25 November 1939; Pleshey, Essex, England
- Died: 28 October 2025 (aged 85)
- Batting: Left-handed
- Role: Batsman

Domestic team information
- Years: Team
- 1962–1963: Essex

Career statistics
Competition	First-class
Matches	29
Runs scored	735
Batting average	17.09
100s/50s	0/2
Top score	82
Catches/stumpings	8/–
- Source: Cricinfo, 15 November 2025

Roger Alfred Geoffrey Luckin (25 November 1939 – 28 October 2025) was an English cricketer. He played first-class cricket for Essex as a batsman in 1962 and 1963.

At Felsted School, Luckin excelled at cricket, scoring more runs (872 at 72.66) than any other Public Schools batsman in 1956. He was selected in the schools team The Rest for the annual match against Southern Schools at Lord's in both 1956 and 1957. In 2021 he was retrospectively chosen as the Wisden School Cricketer of the Year for the 1956 season. In 1957 he also played for Public Schools at Lord's against Combined Services. He went on to Cambridge University (but did not play for the university cricket team) and Writtle Agricultural College.

Luckin played for Essex Second XI as an amateur from 1956 to 1961. In 1961 he scored 417 runs at 59.57. He was promoted to the senior side in 1962 and played 26 matches as an amateur in the final year of amateur status in first-class cricket, scoring 651 runs at 17.59. He hit his highest score of 82 against Middlesex, when his 206-run partnership for the sixth wicket with Barry Knight equalled the Essex record. In assessing Essex's season, Wisden noted that Luckin "batted well at times, though indifferent fielding lessened his value".

He played three first-class matches in 1963, and a few matches for the Essex Second XI in 1963 and 1964. He played for Cambridgeshire in the Minor Counties Cricket Championship from 1969 to 1972 with only moderate success.

Luckin later served as a director of the accounting firm Moores Rowland. He died in October 2025, aged 85.
