= Gilles Sacksick =

French painter and lithographer (1942–2025)

- Born: 31 August 1942; Paris, German-occupied France
- Died: 13 October 2025 (aged 83)
- Occupations: Painter; Lithographer

Gilles Sacksick (French: [ʒil saksik]; 31 August 1942 – 13 October 2025) was a French painter, engraver and lithographer.

== Life and career ==
Born in Paris on 31 August 1942, Sacksick took a particular interest in lithography from a young age, starting work in an intaglio store. In 1967, he exhibited for the first time at the Galerie Dominique Halévy in Paris. He dedicated much of his early career to painting, staying at the Casa de Velázquez in Madrid from 1979 to 1981. His artistic themes explored landscapes, still life, and animals. He was influenced by the masters of the Spanish Golden Age, particularly Francisco de Zurbarán.

Sacksick was described by art historian Aude de Kerros as one of the primary influences of the modern classic movement. In 2005, he founded the "Litho-Lissac" bookstore alongside Bruno Mielvaque, which focused on lithography and artistic books. The Bibliothèque nationale de France conserved some of his stamps in their archives.

Gilles Sacksick died on 13 October 2025, at the age of 83.
