= Karimpat Mathangi Ramakrishnan =

Indian paediatric plastic surgeon (1934–2025)

- Born: 1934; British India
- Died: 27 October 2025 (aged 91); Chennai, Tamil Nadu, India
- Occupation: Paediatric plastic surgeon
- Awards: Padma Shri; Sushruta Gold Medal; Hari Om Ashram Award; NABI Lifetime Achievement Award

Karimpat Mathangi Ramakrishnan (1934 – 27 October 2025) was an Indian paediatric plastic surgeon and a head of the department of Burns, Plastic and Reconstructive Surgery at the Kilpauk Medical College, Chennai. After retirement from the medical college, she joined Kanchi Kamakoti Childs Trust Hospital, Chennai and was the head of the Paediatric Intensive Burn Care Unit and Plastic Surgery of the institution.

Mathangi Ramakrishnan is credited with several medical papers published in peer-reviewed medical journals. She was a recipient of Sushruta Gold Medal from the Sushruta Society of India, Hari Om Ashram Award from the Association of Surgeons of India and the Lifetime achievement award of the National Academy of Burns India. She was honoured by the Government of India, in 2002, with the fourth highest Indian civilian award of Padma Shri.

Mathangi Ramakrishnan died on 27 October 2025, at the age of 91.

== See also ==
- Plastic Surgery
