= Konika Biswas =

Bangladeshi politician (died 2025)

Member of Bangladesh Parliament
- In office 7 March 1973 – 6 November 1976

Personal details
- Born: Orakandi, Gopalganj district, British India
- Died: 29 October 2025 (aged 80) Kolkata, India
- Party: Awami League

Konika Biswas (Bengali: কনিকা বিশ্বাস; died 2025) was an Awami League politician who was indirectly elected to a seat reserved for women in the Bangladesh Parliament in 1973.

== Biography ==
Biswas was born in Orakandi, Gopalganj district, British India.

She was elected to a parliamentary seat reserved for women as an Awami League candidate in 1973. She left Bangladesh after the assassination of Sheikh Mujibur Rahman. Her husband, Biren Raj Biswas, died in 1985. She died in Kolkata on 29 October 2025, aged 80.
