= Mohammed Abu Ramadan =

Palestinian politician (1953–2025)

Mohamed Abu Ramadan
- محمد أبو رمضان

Minister of State for Planning and Administrative Development
- In office 16 May 2012 – 2 June 2014
- Preceded by: Ali Jarbawi
- Succeeded by: Shoukry Bishara

Personal details
- Born: 24 July 1953 Gaza City, All-Palestine Protectorate
- Died: 5 October 2025 (aged 72)
- Party: Independent
- Education: Syracuse University (BBA)
- Occupation: Engineer

Mohammed Abu Ramadan (Arabic: محمد أبو رمضان; 24 July 1953 – 5 October 2025) was a Palestinian politician. An independent, he served as Minister of State for Planning and Administrative Development from 2012 to 2014.

Abu Ramadan died on 5 October 2025, at the age of 72.
