= Kiều Hưng =

Vietnamese singer (1937–2025)

NSƯT Kiều Tất Hưng (14 March 1937 – 30 October 2025), also known as Kiều Hưng, was a Vietnamese singer of Vietnamese revolutionary songs. He was born in Hanoi. From 1968 to 1972, Hưng studied at the Kiev Conservatory, then at the Moscow Conservatory in 1991. Hung died on 30 October 2025, at the age of 88.
