= Kim Gwang-won =

South Korean politician (1940–2025)

- 김광원

Member of the National Assembly of South Korea
- In office 30 May 1996 – 29 May 2008

Personal details
- Born: 15 December 1940 Uljin County, Korea, Japan
- Died: 8 October 2025 (aged 84)
- Political party: NKP; GNP
- Education: Seoul National University

Kim Gwang-won (Korean: 김광원; 15 December 1940 – 8 October 2025) was a South Korean politician. A member of the New Korea Party and the Grand National Party, he served in the National Assembly from 1996 to 2008.

Kim died on 8 October 2025, at the age of 84.
