= Patrick Dimon =

Greek-born-Brazilian singer (1946–2025)

Konstantynos Kazakos (6 June 1946 – 13 October 2025), known by the stage name Patrick Dimon, was a Greek-born-Brazilian singer.

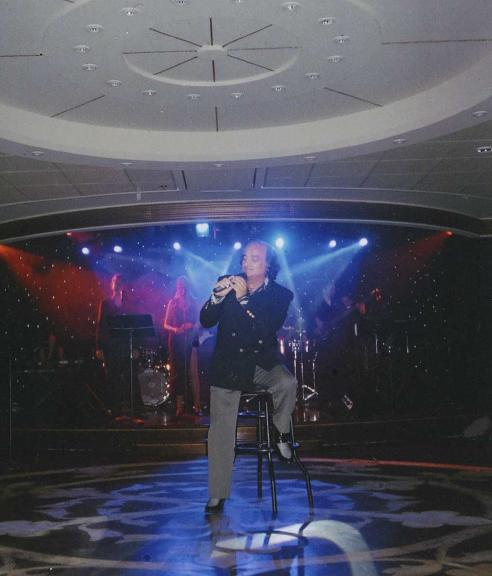
Patrick Dimon

== Life and work ==
Dimon was born on 6 June 1946 in Samos, Greece. His father was a consular representative and traveled frequently. He eventually relocated to Brazil, He recorded his first single in 1969, titled Las Amorosas.

His most popular song throughout his career was Pigeon Without a Dove, an adaptation of an aria from the classic O Guarani, by Carlos Gomes. In 1979, the song was used as the theme for the soap opera Pai Herói, on TV Globo.

He died on 13 October 2025, aged 79.
