= Wincenty Olszewski =

Polish politician (1934–2025)

Member of the Senate of Poland
- In office 19 September 1993 – 20 October 1997

Personal details
- Born: 26 March 1934 Olszewo, Poland
- Died: 6 October 2025 (aged 91)
- Political party: SLD
- Education: Pedagogical University of Kraków
- Occupation: Schoolteacher

Wincenty Olszewski (26 March 1934 – 6 October 2025) was a Polish politician. A member of the Democratic Left Alliance, he served in the Senate from 1993 to 1997.

Olszewski died on 6 October 2025, at the age of 91.
