= Antoni Lallican =

French photojournalist (1988–2025)

- Born: January, 1988; Paris, France
- Died: October 3, 2025 (aged 37); Donbas, Ukraine
- Occupation: Photojournalist
- Website: www.antonilallican.com

Antoni Lallican (January 1988 – October 3, 2025) was a French photojournalist. He was killed by a drone while covering the Russo-Ukrainian war.

== Early life and career ==
Lallican was born in January 1988 in Paris, where he lived as an adult. He was the son of Daniel and Françoise Lallican and grew up in the village of Villers-sur-Coudun, in the department of Oise, north of Paris. He attended Pierre d’Ailly high school in Compiègne. He originally qualified as a pharmacist, and his first job was in this sector. However he did not enjoy this career path, and took to travelling the world. When he was 30, he started photographing the internal tensions in Kashmir and decided that his future would be as a photo-journalist.

== Photo-journalist ==
Lallican developed an interest in conflict areas; his work took him to Nagorno-Karabakh, Armenia, Israel, Lebanon and Syria. He was on the books of the Hans Lucas agency, which he joined in 2018, but his final trip to Ukraine was not under their sponsorship. In 2021 Lallican took up training at EMI (l'École des métiers de l’information) in Paris. His work appeared in many French newspapers, including Le Monde, Le Figaro, La Croix and Libération. His photography work in Ukraine started in March 2022, and had won him the 2024 Victor Hugo Prize for committed photography, part of the Besançon Photography Festival.

== Death ==
Lallican was killed on the morning of 3 October 2025 in Donbas, Ukraine, when the vehicle he and a Ukrainian colleague, Grigoriy Ivanchenko, were in was hit by a drone. The drone was controlled via First Person View (FPV) and was targeted from the Russian side of the conflict. Ivanchenko, was seriously injured in the same attack and his leg had to be amputated. According to the Ukrainian authorities, the car was hit on the outskirts of Komyshuvakha, near Zaporizhzhia, when taking journalists on a visit to a unit of the 4th Ukrainian Armoured Brigade. The location was about 15 kilometres from the front line. Lallican was at least the 17th journalist to be killed in the Russo-Ukrainian war, and according to a joint statement by the European and International Federations of Journalists, the first to be killed by a drone. He was the fourth French death from within the journalism profession. The French President, Emmanuel Macron, condemned the attack and paid tribute to the journalists who risked their lives to report on the war.

On 5 October 2025 the French National Anti-Terrorism Prosecutor's Office (Parquet national antiterroriste (PNAT) said it had referred Lallican's killing for investigation as a potential war crime.

== Personal life ==
As a teenager he was a competitive rower for his club, Sport nautique Compiégnois. He was part of the coxed four that won the French 2004 title in Vichy. According to Agence France-Presse, who interviewed his parents, Lallican had entered into a civil partnership with his partner about a month before his death.
