= Gustavo Aliaga =

Bolivian politician (1955–2025)

Gustavo Aliaga Palma
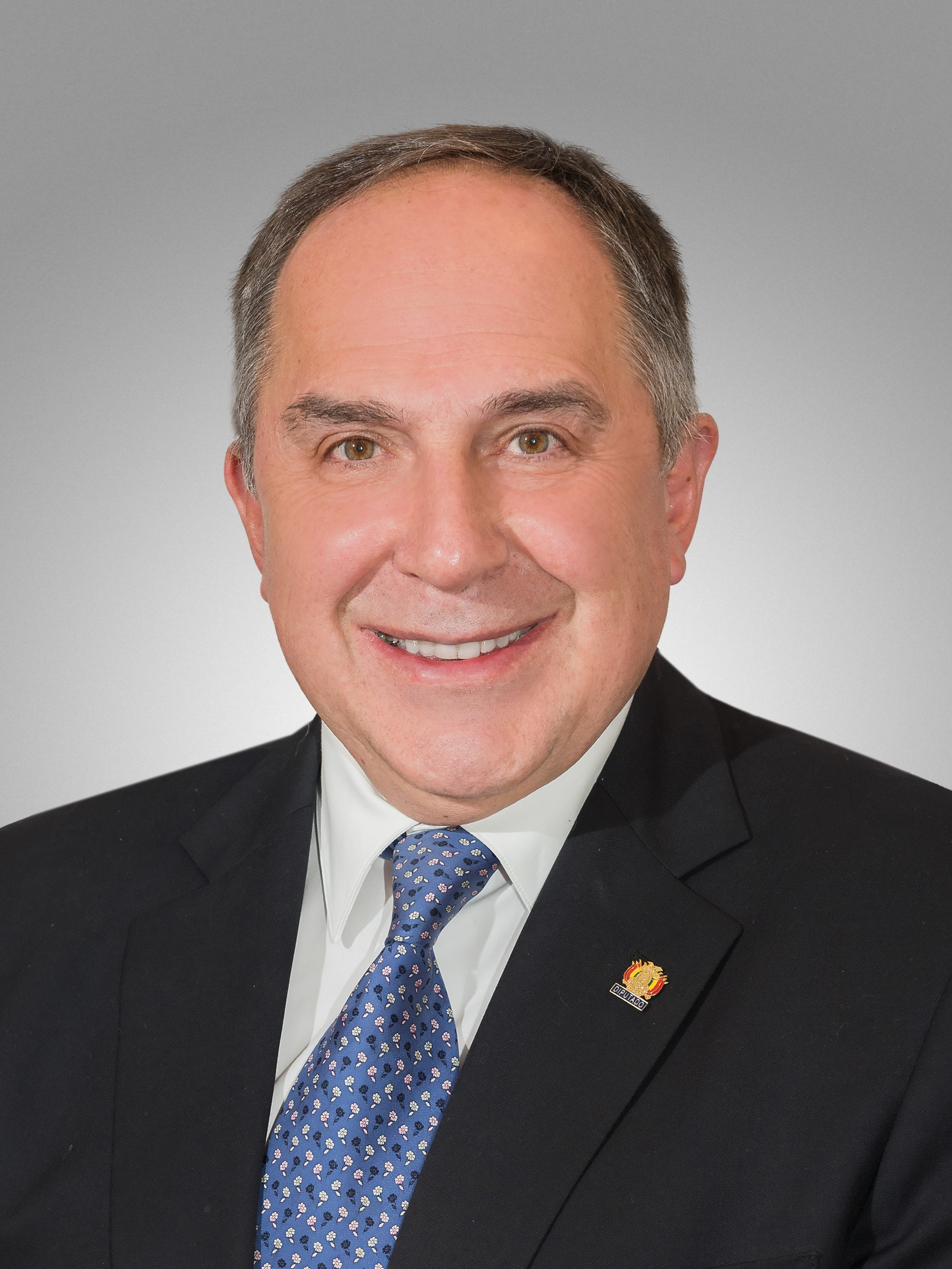
- Aliaga in 2020

Member of the Chamber of Deputies of Bolivia
- In office 18 October 2020 – 17 August 2025

Personal details
- Born: Gustavo Adolfo Aliaga Palma; 22 August 1955 La Paz, Bolivia
- Died: 16 October 2025 (aged 70) La Paz, Bolivia
- Political party: CC
- Education: University of Belgrano; Catholic University of El Salvador
- Occupation: Diplomat

Gustavo Adolfo Aliaga Palma (22 August 1955 – 16 October 2025) was a Bolivian politician. A member of the Civic Community, he served in the Chamber of Deputies from 2020 to 2025.

Aliaga died from complications of surgery in La Paz, on 16 October 2025, at the age of 70.
