= K. Narahari =

Indian politician (1932–2025)

Member of Karnataka Legislative Council
- In office 1 July 1984 – 30 June 2002
- Succeeded by: Puttanna
- Constituency: Bangalore Teachers

Personal details
- Born: 25 May 1932 Mysore, Mysore State, India
- Died: 8 October 2025 (aged 93) Bengaluru, Karnataka, India
- Political party: Bharatiya Janata Party
- Education: B.Sc, B.E
- Profession: Professor, politician

K. Narahari (25 May 1932 – 8 October 2025) was an Indian politician from the Bharatiya Janata Party, Karnataka who was the Member of Karnataka Legislative Council representing Bangalore Teachers constituency from 1984 till 2002 when he lost to Puttanna of JDS. Narahari died on 8 October 2025, at the age of 93.
