= Lee Sang-min (politician, born 1958) =

South Korean politician (1958–2025)

- 이상민
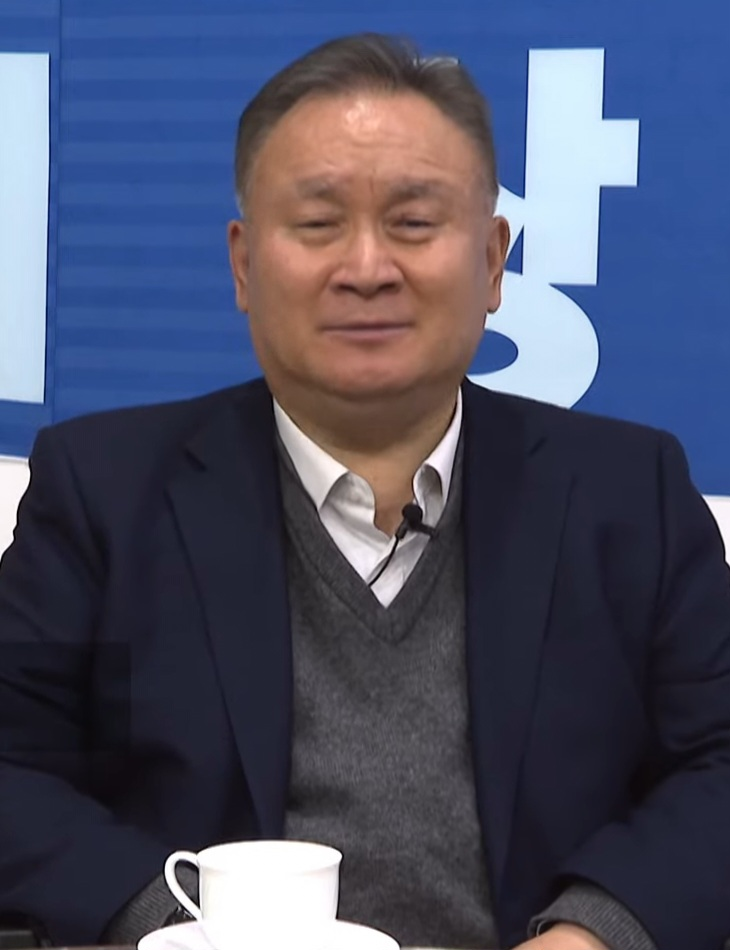
- Lee in 2022

Member of the National Assembly of South Korea
- In office 30 May 2004 – 29 May 2024

Personal details
- Born: 22 January 1958 Daejeon, South Korea
- Died: 15 October 2025 (aged 67) Yuseong District, South Korea
- Party: Uri; UDP; Democratic
- Education: Chungnam National University (LLB); Seoul National University (LLM)
- Occupation: Lawyer

Lee Sang-min (Korean: 이상민; 22 January 1958 – 15 October 2025) was a South Korean politician. A member of the Uri Party, the United Democratic Party, and the Democratic Party, he served in the National Assembly from 2004 to 2024.

Lee died from a cardiac arrest in Yuseong District, on 15 October 2025, at the age of 67.
