= Alfa-Betty Olsen =

American writer and casting director

Alfa-Betty Olsen (1936 – October 5, 2025) was an American writer and casting director. She was a longtime working partner with comedian Mel Brooks.

== Books ==
- with Marshall Efron, Bible Stories You Can't Forget No Matter How Hard You Try (1976)
- with Marshall Efron, They Said They Would Eat Anything And They Did (1979)
- Sin City Fables (1981)
- with Marshall Efron, Really Scared Stiff-Three Creepy Tales (1992)
- with Marshall Efron, Gabby The Shrew (1994)
