= Park Seung-guk =

South Korean politician (1940–2025)

Park Seung-gun
- 박승국

Member of the National Assembly of South Korea
- In office 21 July 1998 – 29 May 2004

Personal details
- Born: 1 April 1940 Uljin County, Korea, Japan
- Died: 2 October 2025 (aged 85) Seongbuk District, Seoul, South Korea
- Political party: GNP
- Education: Kyungpook National University (BA); Yeungnam University (MA)

Park Seung-guk (Korean: 박승국; 1 April 1940 – 2 October 2025) was a South Korean politician. A member of the Grand National Party, he served in the National Assembly from 1998 to 2004.

Park died in Seongbuk District on 2 October 2025, at the age of 85.
