= Ali Mahjoubi =

Tunisian academic and historian (1939–2025)

- علي المحجوبي
- Born: 1939; Jebiniana, French protectorate of Tunisia
- Died: 20 October 2025 (aged 85–86)
- Occupations: Historian; academic

Ali Mahjoubi (Arabic: علي المحجوبي; 1939 – 20 October 2025) was a Tunisian historian and academic who specialised in the Late modern period.

== Life and career ==
Born in Jebiniana in 1939, Mahjoubi spent the majority of his career teaching at Tunis University and was dean of the Faculty of Human and Social Sciences from 1993 to 1996. A member of the Higher Authority for Realisation of the Objectives of the Revolution, Political Reform and Democratic Transition, he was a visiting professor at several Arab and European universities. His primary area of study focused around contemporary Tunisian history and decolonization of the Maghreb.

Ali Mahjoubi died on 20 October 2025.

== Publications ==
- L'établissement du protectorat français en Tunisie (1977)
- Les origines du mouvement national en Tunisie (1904–1934) (1982)
- Quand le soleil s'est levé à l'Ouest : Tunisie 1881, impérialisme et résistance (1983)
