= Gwon Hae-ok =

South Korean politician (1935–2025)

- 권해옥

Member of the National Assembly of South Korea
- In office 30 May 1988 – 29 May 1996

Personal details
- Born: 15 August 1935 Hapcheon County, Korea, Japan
- Died: 10 October 2025 (aged 90)
- Party: DJP; DLP
- Education: Konkuk University Law School; Seoul National University
- Occupation: Reporter

Gwon Hae-ok (Korean: 권해옥; 15 August 1935 – 10 October 2025) was a South Korean politician. A member of the Democratic Justice Party and the Democratic Liberal Party, he served in the National Assembly from 1988 to 1996.

Gwon died on 10 October 2025, at the age of 90.
