= Paul Kato Atita =

Beninese lawyer (died 2025)

- Died: 10 October 2025; Porto-Novo, Benin
- Education: University of Abomey-Calavi
- Occupation: Lawyer

Paul Kato Atita (died 10 October 2025) was Beninese lawyer who specialised in constitutional law.

== Life and career ==
Atita studied at the University of Abomey-Calavi and became registered with the Court of Appeal of Cotonou in 1994. He also participated in seminars on the rights of prisoners, highlighting the need for continued education in the judicial system. In 2016, he defended Trinity Trading Limited Sarl in a drug trafficking case, arguing that the company was framed during the discovery of 54 kilograms of cocaine in the port of Cotonou. He also defended Olivier Boko and Oswald Homeky amidst their charges of "conspiracy against state security". In a 2012 television broadcast, he spoke in favor of President Thomas Boni Yayi, emphasizing the need to respect state institutions. In 2019, he criticized the closure of the Benin–Nigeria border, claiming that the real reasons for the closure were more complex than what was released by Porto-Novo.

Atita died on 10 October 2025.
