= Idzi Drzycimski =

Polish academic and biologist (1933–2025)

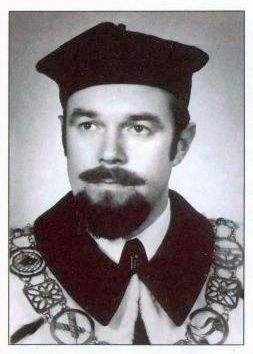
- Born: 5 December 1933; Klonowo, Poland
- Died: 25 October 2025 (aged 91); Ińsko, Poland
- Occupations: University professor and rector

Academic background
- Education: Odesa I. I. Mechnykov National University

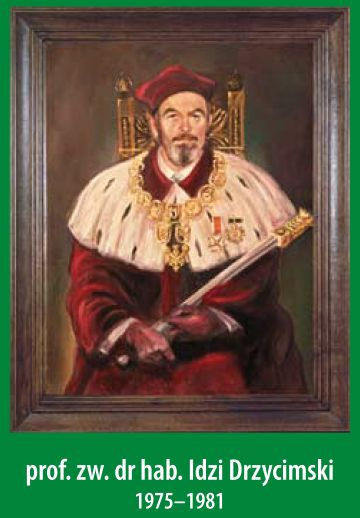
A painting in the University Senate hall

Idzi Drzycimski (5 December 1933 – 25 October 2025) was a Polish biologist and academic who was a professor of geographical sciences in the discipline of oceanology, with a specialisation in marine ecology and biology. He was also rector of the Agricultural University in Szczecin from 1975 to 1981.

== Life and career ==
After finishing Primary School in Klonowo in 1947 and passing Matura at the General Secondary School in Tuchola in 1952, Drzycimski moved to Odesa to study Biology with a speciality in Hydrobiology at the Odesa I. I. Mechnykov National University. After finishing his studies in 1957, Drzycimski worked at the Sea Fishers Institute in Gdynia in the Department of Oceanography headed by Professor Kazimierz Demel, and then at the Department of Oceanography and Marine Biology at the Agricultural and Technical University in Olsztyn at the Faculty of Fishers. Since 1958 he was a member of PZPR.

In 1963, Drzycimski obtained a doctoral degree in natural sciences, and in 1969 Drzycimski received his Habilitation. In 1968, he moved to Szczecin alongside a part of the Faculty to establish the Faculty of Sea Fishers. Drzycimski then received his academic title of associate professor in 1975. Drzycimski would then be the Rector of the Agricultural University in Szczecin in two terms, 1975–78 and 1978–81.

He described 11 new species and 3 new genera of marine crustaceans, which became permanent entries in the International Code of Zoological Nomenclature. He supervised 8 doctoral students and was the supervisor of the honorary doctorate of Kenneth Sherman from the US (1989). In 2001 he was awarded the Medal of Professor Kazimierz Demela. Drzycimski was author to over 100 publications, most famously Harpacticoida (Copepoda) of the Polish coastal waters of the Baltic Sea in 1974.

Drzycimski died on 25 October 2025, at the age of 91. He was buried at the Municipal Cemetery in Ińsko, on 29 October.

== Described animal species ==
=== New genera of marine crustaceans ===
- Miersia carinthiaca whose name comes from the Latin name of Lake Wörthersee in Carinthia (Kärnten).
- Miersia orientalis whose name means "eastern".
- Miersia tridentata whose name refers to its three-pronged shape (tridente).
