= Philippe Collin (film director) =

French film director and actor (1931–2025)

- Born: 19 November 1931; Paris, France
- Died: 17 October 2025 (aged 93)
- Education: Institut des hautes études cinématographiques
- Occupations: Film director, actor

Philippe Collin (French pronunciation: [filip kɔlɛ̃]; 19 November 1931 – 17 October 2025) was a French film director and actor.

After his studies at the Institut des hautes études cinématographiques, he worked as an assistant to directors Jean Renoir and Marc Allégret. In 2009, he received the audiovisual prize from the Société civile des auteurs multimédia.

Collin died on 17 October 2025, at the age of 93.

== Filmography ==
=== Director ===
- Ciné Follies (1977)
- Le Fils puni (1980)
- Les Derniers Jours d'Emmanuel Kant (1993)
- Aux abois (2005)

=== Actor ===
- The Lady Banker (1980)
- Le Borgne (1980)
- Jeux d'artifices (1987)
- Sélect Hôtel (1997)
