= Ernst Homberger (politician) =

Swiss politician (1937–2025)

Member of the Government Council of Zürich
- In office 1991–1999

Personal details
- Born: 23 July 1937 Gossau, Switzerland
- Died: 3 October 2025 (aged 88)
- Political party: FDP
- Education: ETH Zurich
- Occupation: Agronomist

Ernst Homberger (23 July 1937 – 3 October 2025) was a Swiss politician. A member of the Free Democratic Party, he served in the Government Council of Zürich from 1991 to 1999.

Homberger died on 3 October 2025 at the age of 88.
