= Shin Sang-sik =

South Korean politician (1937–2025)

- 신상식

Member of the National Assembly of South Korea
- In office 11 April 1981 – 29 May 1996

Personal details
- Born: 8 January 1937 Miryang, Korea, Japan
- Died: 16 October 2025 (aged 88)
- Political party: DJP; DLP
- Education: Yonsei University
- Occupation: Accountant

Shin Sang-sik (Korean: 신상식; 8 January 1937 – 16 October 2025) was a South Korean politician. A member of the Democratic Justice Party and the Democratic Liberal Party, he served in the National Assembly from 1981 to 1996.

Shin died on 16 October 2025, at the age of 88.
