= Zhou Guozhi =

Chinese material scientist and physical chemist (1937–2025)

- 周国治
- Born: 25 March 1937; Nanjing, Jiangsu, China
- Died: 20 October 2025 (aged 88); Boston, Massachusetts, U.S.
- Education: University of Science and Technology Beijing
- Scientific career
- Fields: Metallurgical materials
- Workplaces: University of Science and Technology Beijing

Chinese name
- Simplified Chinese: 周国治
- Traditional Chinese: 周國治
Transcriptions
Standard Mandarin
- Hanyu Pinyin: Zhōu Guózhì
- Wade–Giles: Chou Kuo-chih

Zhou Guozhi (Chinese: 周国治; 25 March 1937 – 20 October 2025) was a Chinese material scientist and physical chemist. He was an academician with the Chinese Academy of Sciences (CAS), and a professor of material science and engineering in Shanghai University.

Zhou was a member of the 10th National Committee of the Chinese People's Political Consultative Conference.

== Background ==
Zhou was born in Nanjing, Jiangsu, on 25 March 1937, while his ancestral home is in Chaoyang, Guangdong. His father Zhou Xiuqi graduated from Germany and taught at Shanghai Jiaotong University. He graduated from the Department of Metallurgy at Beijing Steel and Iron Institute (now University of Science and Technology Beijing) in 1960 and stayed to teach after graduation. He began his international academic career as a visiting scholar at Massachusetts Institute of Technology in 1979. He returned to China in 1982 and continued to teach at the University of Science and Technology Beijing. In July 2001, he worked part-time as a professor and doctoral supervisor at the School of Materials Science and Engineering, Shanghai University. He died in Boston, United States on 20 October 2025, at the age of 88.

== Contributions ==
Zhou developed a next-generation geometric model known as "Chou Model" for solutions that resolved long-standing limitations in traditional models. This breakthrough enabled fully computerized thermodynamic calculations for multicomponent systems and was widely adopted in textbooks and industrial applications. He proposed a novel mathematical approach to calculate partial molar properties in ternary and multicomponent systems, simplifying the extraction of thermodynamic data from phase diagrams. He established "Oxygen Ion Migration Theory" on oxygen ion transport in electrolytes, leading to innovations like "pollution-free deoxidation" and more efficient extraction processes. He created a unified kinetic model (RPP model) for reactions involving micro- and nano-particles, applied in hydrogen storage and semiconductor materials.

== Honours and awards ==
- 1995 Member of the Chinese Academy of Sciences (CAS)
- 1997 State Natural Science Award (Third Class)
- 2017 Wei Shoukun Metallurgy Gold Award
- 2017 Honorary Member of the Iron and Steel Institute of Japan
