= Caroline Litzenberger =

American historian (1942–2025)

- Born: Caroline J. Wiles; November 2, 1942; Tacoma, Washington, U.S.
- Died: October 27, 2025 (aged 82); Clackamas, Oregon, U.S.
- Education: University of Washington (B.S.); Portland State University (MA), Trinity College, Cambridge (Ph.D.)
- Occupations: Historian, author, educator, computer programmer, Episcopal priest
- Partner: Janet Plog
- Children: 2

Caroline Litzenberger (née Caroline J. Wiles; November 2, 1942 – October 27, 2025) was an American historian, author, Episcopal priest, and educator. She specialized in the history of the early-modern England.

== Early life and education ==
Caroline Litzenberger was born on November 2, 1942, in Tacoma, Washington. Her parents were Luther Theodore Wiles and Barbara Patricia More Wiles. She attended Gig Harbor High School from where she graduated in 1960.

Litzenberger completed a B.S. degree at the University of Washington in mathematics with concentration in probability and statistics, and a minor in history in 1964. She received a M.A. degree in 1989 from Portland State University; and a Ph.D. in 1993 at Trinity College, Cambridge in England.

== Career and late life ==
In her early career, Litzenberger worked as a computer programmer for Boeing in Seattle starting in 1964. She later worked as a systems analyst for the Port of Portland in the 1980s.

Litzenberger was a professor at West Virginia University in Morgantown from 1994 until 1999. In 2002, she became an associate professor of history at the Portland State University in Portland.

In January 2000, she became a Fellow of the Royal Historical Society.

She was a lifelong member of the Episcopal Church.

Litzenberger died of multiple myeloma and complications of rheumatoid arthritis on 27 October 2025, in Clackamas, Oregon.

== Selected publications ==
- The English Reformation and the Laity: Gloucestershire, 1540–1580. Cambridge University Press. 1997. doi:10.1017/CBO9780511582011. ISBN 978-0-521-47545-7. OCLC 36343258.
- Litzenberger, Caroline (1998) [1997]. "The Coming of Protestantism to Elizabethan Tewkesbury". In Collinson, Patrick; Craig, John (eds.). The Reformation in English Towns, 1500–1640. London: Macmillan Education UK. pp. 79–93. doi:10.1007/978-1-349-26832-0_5. ISBN 978-1-350-48782-6. OCLC 1474907474.
- "Local responses to changes in religious policy based on evidence from Gloucestershire wills (1540–1580)". Continuity and Change. 8 (3): 417–439. December 1993. doi:10.1017/S0268416000002174. ISSN 0268-4160.
- "Richard Cheyney, Bishop of Gloucester: An Infidel in Religion?". The Sixteenth Century Journal. 25 (3): 567–584. September 1, 1994. doi:10.2307/2542634. ISSN 0361-0160. JSTOR 2542634.
