= Aimo and Nadia Moroni =

Italian Michelin-star chefs

- Children: Stefania Moroni
- Culinary career
- Cooking style: Italian Slow Food
- Rating: Michelin Stars

Aimo and Nadia Moroni were an Italian husband-and-wife culinary duo from the Lombardy region.

== Background ==
Aimo Moroni was born in Pescia, Pistoia in January 1934, and Nadia in Chiesina Uzzanese in 1940. While still young, Aimo moved to Milan with his mother, Nunzia, who was a cook. Nadia moved to Milan at age eleven. In 1955, Aimo opened a restaurant near the Centrale. The two met at this restaurant the following year, and became the culinary duo they are known as today.

Aimo Moroni died on 6 October 2025, at the age of 91.

== Career ==
The couple opened Trattoria Aimo e Nadia in 1962 in the Primaticcio neighborhood of Milan on via Montecuccoli. They later moved the restaurant to a suburban area.

Aimo and Nadia are known for their modern take on traditional Italian cuisine, incorporating fresh, seasonal ingredients and the concept of "slow food" into their dishes, and are now credited with being the pioneers of Italian slow food.

In addition to their restaurant, Aimo and Nadia were cookbook authors, publishing several well-regarded books on Italian cuisine. The duo was active in promoting Italian cuisine and culture internationally, participating in culinary events and promoting the use of Italian products and techniques, until their retirement in the early 2000s. After the retirement of Aimo and Nadia, their restaurant Trattoria Aimo e Nadia continued to operate under the leadership of new chefs and the name "Il Luogo di Aimo e Nadia". "Il Luogo di Aimo e Nadia" received two Michelin stars and is known for its innovative Italian cuisine. In December 2023 "Il Luogo" lost one of its Michelin stars.

== Recognition ==
According to Identita Golose, they are internationally recognized. One of their more prominent dishes is spaghetto al cipollotto, or spaghetti with spring onion, which according to Corriere della Sera is often ordered instead of dessert. Identita Golose included the dish in their list of 40 masterpieces of the Italian kitchen.
