= Deaths in November 2025 =

The following is a list of notable deaths in November 2025.

Entries for each day are listed alphabetically by surname. A typical entry lists information in the following sequence:

- Name, age, country of citizenship at birth, subsequent country of citizenship (if applicable), reason for notability, cause of death (if known), and reference.

== November 2025 ==
=== 1 ===
- John Adair, 91, British leadership theorist.
- Hedayat Amin Arsala, 83, Afghan economist and politician, vice president (2001–2002), minister of foreign affairs (1993–1994) and finance (2001–2002).
- Armand Avril, 98, French painter and sculptor.
- Alojz Bajc, 93, Slovenian Olympic road racing cyclist (1960).
- Charles D. Baker, 97, American businessman and politician, U.S. deputy secretary of health and human services (1983–1984).
- Eddy Boissézon, 73, Mauritian politician, vice-president (2019–2024).
- Beverly Burns, 76, American airline pilot.
- Michael Chamberlin, 88, American biochemist and molecular biologist.
- Martha Layne Collins, 88, American politician, governor (1983–1987) and lieutenant governor of Kentucky (1979–1983).
- Ray Drummond, 78, American jazz bassist and teacher.
- Colin Duriez, 78, English writer.
- Ray W. Faricy, 90, American politician.
- John Farragher, 68, Australian rugby league player (Penrith Panthers), cardiac arrest.
- Archie Fisher, 86, Scottish folk singer and songwriter.
- Clyde Hart, 91, American track and field coach (Baylor Bears), cancer.
- Robert A. Junell, 78, American politician and jurist, member of the Texas House of Representatives (1989–2003), judge of the U.S. District Court for the Western District of Texas (since 2003).
- Elspeth King, 76, Scottish art curator.
- Edward Lone Fight, 86, American First Nations leader, chairman of the Three Affiliated Tribes (1986–1990).
- Carlos Manzo, 40, Mexican politician, mayor of Uruapan (since 2024) and deputy (2021–2024), shot.
- Tim Marrs, 80, English toxicologist.
- Hal Mauthe, 95, Canadian football player (Winnipeg Blue Bombers).
- Mike Mehta, 78, Indian advocate, actor and theatre director.
- Kenneth Minihan, 81, American Air Force general, director of the National Security Agency (1996–1999).
- Lorena Mirambell, 90, Mexican archaeologist.
- Aftab Shaban Mirani, 84–85, Pakistani politician, chief minister of Sindh (1990), minister of defence (1993–1996), and MP (2014–2023).
- Stephen Morris, 79, American politician, member (1993–2013) and president (2005–2012) of the Kansas Senate, president of the National Conference of State Legislatures (2011–2012).
- Jean de Dieu Moukagni Iwangou, 65, Gabonese politician and magistrate.
- Laila Øygarden, 78, Norwegian politician, county mayor of Aust-Agder (2007–2011).
- Faruk Fatih Özer, 31, Turkish cryptocurrency trader and convicted fraudster, founder of Thodex, suicide by hanging.
- Jungle Phillips, 69, Australian artist.
- Mykhailo Reznik, 75, Ukrainian diplomat, ambassador to China (2001–2003) and the United States (2003–2005).
- Duane Roberts, 88, American businessman, inventor of the frozen burrito.
- Anna Sandor, 76, Hungarian-born Canadian-American television writer (Hangin' In), complications from melanoma.
- Thierry Sardo, 58, French football manager (New Caledonia national team).
- Omid Sarlak, 27, Iranian activist.
- Ralph Senensky, 102, American television director (Star Trek, The Waltons, The F.B.I.).
- Immo Stabreit, 92, German diplomat, ambassador to South Africa (1987–1992), ambassador to the United States (1992–1995).
- Tom Stolhandske, 94, American football player (San Francisco 49ers, Edmonton Eskimos).
- Marina Yee, 67, Belgian fashion designer (Antwerp Six), cancer.
- Young Bleed, 51, American rapper, complications from ruptured brain aneurysm.

=== 2 ===
- José Ángel Aguirrebengoa, 72–73, Spanish politician, member of the Parliament of Navarre (2007–2011).
- Aki Banayi, 81, Iranian singer.
- Sara Banerji, 93, British author and artist.
- Leszek Bednarczuk, 89, Polish linguist.
- Lô Borges, 73, Brazilian singer-songwriter and guitarist (Clube da Esquina), multiple organ failure complicated by medication poisoning.
- Joseph Byrd, 87, American musician (The United States of America), songwriter ("Hard Coming Love"), and film composer (Health).
- Ronald Ian Cheffins, 95, Canadian lawyer and political scientist.
- Stanley M. Chesley, 89, American lawyer, complications from dementia.
- Maurice Denuzière, 99, French journalist and writer.
- James Diehl, 88, American evangelical Christian minister.
- Herbert A. Donovan Jr., 94, American Episcopal cleric.
- Giovanni Galeone, 84, Italian football player (Udinese) and manager (Pescara, Napoli).
- Albert Ganado, 101, Maltese lawyer, historian, and cartographer.
- Donna Jean Godchaux, 78, American Hall of Fame singer (Grateful Dead, Donna Jean Godchaux Band), cancer.
- Richard Gott, 87, British journalist (The Guardian).
- Mark Hallett, 82, American neurologist.
- Mainul Haque, 62, Indian politician, West Bengal MLA (2016–2021), cardiac arrest.
- Betty Harford, 98, American actress (Dynasty, The Paper Chase, Inside Daisy Clover).
- Yoshinori Hirose, 89, Japanese baseball player (Nankai Hawks) and manager.
- Donald Huffman, 89–90, American academic.
- Allene Johnson, 92, American chemist.
- William Duffy Keller, 91, American jurist, judge of the U.S. District Court for Central California (since 1984).
- Harald Klose, 80, German footballer (Schalke 04, Valenciennes, AC Cambrai).
- Ivan Laptev, 91, Russian journalist and politician, member of the Supreme Soviet of the Soviet Union (1984–1989), chairman of the Soviet of the Union (1990–1991).
- Élie Lefranc, 93, French racing cyclist.
- Françoise Lengellé, 80–81, French harpsichordist and music professor (Conservatoire national supérieur de musique et de danse de Lyon).
- Allan Ludwig, 92, American historian and photographer.
- Bona Malwal, 97, South Sudanese journalist (The Vigilant) and politician, minister of information (1973–1978).
- Walter Maslow, 97, American actor (Atlas, Man with a Camera, The Cosmic Man).
- Pakubuwono XIII, 77, Indonesian traditional ruler, susuhunan (since 2004), hyperglycemia and kidney failure.
- Igor Palmin, 92, Russian photographer and journalist.
- Rafael de Paula, 85, Spanish bullfighter, cardiovascular complications.
- Pavel Prošek, 85, Czech physical geographer and climatologist, founder of Mendel Polar Station.
- Renaud Revel, 71, French journalist (Le Matin de Paris, L'Express).
- Robert H. Romer, 94, American physicist.
- John Wesley Ryles, 74, American country music singer ("Kay") and songwriter.
- George Sacco, 89, American politician, member of the Massachusetts House of Representatives (1963–1974).
- Jim Self, 82, American tubist and composer.
- Bob Trumpy, 80, American football player (Cincinnati Bengals) and broadcaster (NBC, Westwood One).
- Guido Venturoni, 91, Italian naval officer, chief of staff of the Navy (1992–1993) and the defence staff (1994–1999), and chair of the NATO Military Committee (1999–2002).
- Setti Warren, 55, American politician, mayor of Newton, Massachusetts (2010–2018).
- Alejo Zavala Castro, 83, Mexican Roman Catholic prelate, bishop of Tlapa (1992–2005) and of Chilpancingo-Chilapa (2005–2015).

=== 3 ===
- Kambiz Atabay, 86, Iranian football administrator, president of FFI (1972–1979) and the AFC (1976–1978).
- Rudolf Belin, 82, Croatian football player (Dinamo Zagreb, Beerschot V.A.V.) and manager (Yugoslavia national team).
- Judy Bell, 89, American Hall of Fame golfer and golf administrator, president of the USGA (1996–1997).
- Charles Bidwill Jr., 97, American businessman, owner of the Chicago / St. Louis Cardinals (1962–1972).
- Valery Borshchyov, 81, Russian politician and human rights activist, member of the Mossoviet (1990–1993), MP (1993–1999).
- Clara Charf, 100, Brazilian political activist (Brazilian Communist Party, Workers' Party).
- Dick Cheney, 84, American politician, vice president (2001–2009), secretary of defense (1989–1993), and member of the U.S. House of Representatives (1979–1989), pneumonia and heart disease.
- Jacqueline Cohen, 91, French dubbing actress.
- Victor Conte, 75, American musician (Tower of Power), businessman and convicted money launderer (BALCO scandal), founder and president (1983–2003) of BALCO, pancreatic cancer.
- André De Nul, 79, Belgian footballer (Lierse, Anderlecht, national team).
- Robert Docter, 97, American educator.
- Daya Dongre, 85, Indian actress (Umbartha, Navri Mile Navryala, Shubh Mangal Savdhan).
- David Gow, 80, British journalist (The Guardian), heart attack.
- Barbara R. Hatton, 84, American academic administrator, president of South Carolina State University (1993–1995) and Knoxville College (1997–2005).
- Eugene Hughes, 67, Irish Gaelic footballer (Monaghan), cancer.
- Tony Hunt, 80-81, British medievalist.
- Stanislaus Kennedy, 86, Irish Roman Catholic nun and social activist, founder of Focus Ireland.
- Kim Yong-nam, 97, North Korean politician, president of the Presidium of the SPA (1998–2019) and minister of foreign affairs (1983–1998), multiple organ failure complicated by colorectal cancer.
- Diane Ladd, 89, American actress (Alice Doesn't Live Here Anymore, Wild at Heart, Rambling Rose), BAFTA winner (1976), respiratory failure complicated by idiopathic pulmonary fibrosis.
- Liu Dagang, 78, Chinese actor (Kung Fu Cult Master, Journey to the West, Romance of the Three Kingdoms).
- John Marshall, 85, British politician, MEP (1979–1989) and MP (1987–1997).
- Rubén Martínez Huelmo, 76, Uruguayan politician, senator (2015–2020) and president of the Mercosur Parliament (2013–2015).
- Ken Mayfield, 77, American basketball player (New York Knicks).
- Giancarlo Pasquini, 88, Italian politician, senator (1996–2006).
- Joost Prinsen, 83, Dutch actor and television presenter (De Stratemakeropzeeshow, Het Klokhuis), cancer and complications from a stroke.
- Leonard Radowski, 73, Polish footballer (Lechia Gdańsk, Olimpia Elbląg).
- Dipak Sarma, 57, Indian flutist.
- Jay M. Savage, 97, American herpetologist.
- Richard Sharp, 87, English rugby union player (Barbarians, national team, British & Irish Lions), complications from Parkinson's disease.
- Kamal Uddin Siddiqui, 80, Bangladeshi economist and social scientist.
- Dragan Simeunović, 71, Serbian footballer (Red Star Belgrade, Yugoslavia national team).
- Peter Skalicky, 84, Austrian academic, rector of TU Wien (1991–2011).
- Gerard Somer, 81, Dutch football player (Go Ahead Eagles, Vitesse) and manager (Heracles Almelo).
- Henry Todd, 80, Scottish mountaineer and convicted drug dealer.
- Daniel Willington, 83, Argentine footballer (Talleres de Córdoba, Vélez Sarsfield, national team).
- Constantin Zamfir, 74, Romanian footballer (Petrolul Ploiești, FCSB, national team).
- Tayeb Zitouni, 69, Algerian politician.
- Mladen Žižović, 44, Bosnian footballer (Zrinjski Mostar, national team) and manager (Radnički 1923).

=== 4 ===
- Claude Bébéar, 90, French insurance executive, CEO of AXA (1985–2000).
- Sir Geoffrey Bindman, 92, English lawyer.
- Stuart Boam, 77, English football player (Mansfield Town, Middlesbrough, Newcastle United) and manager.
- Keith Browner, 63, American football player (Tampa Bay Buccaneers, San Francisco 49ers, San Diego Chargers).
- Cheng Tong Fatt, 96, Singaporean public servant, media executive and diplomat.
- George C. Christie, 91, American legal scholar.
- Francine Christophe, 92, French writer and Holocaust survivor.
- Tom Courchene, 85, Canadian economist.
- Dominik Duka, 82, Czech Roman Catholic cardinal, bishop of Hradec Králové (1998–2010) and archbishop of Prague (2010–2022).
- Ada Feinberg-Sireni, 95, Italian-born Israeli politician, MK (1969–1974).
- Joseph Fewsmith, 76, American political scientist.
- Giorgio Forattini, 94, Italian political cartoonist (La Repubblica, La Stampa, Il Giornale).
- Elizabeth Franz, 84, American actress (Death of a Salesman, Sabrina, Christmas with the Kranks), Tony winner (1999), cancer.
- Bernard Hall, 83, English footballer (Bristol Rovers).
- Gopichand Hinduja, 85, Indian conglomerate industry executive, chairman of Hinduja Group (since 1971).
- Knut Kjeldstadli, 77, Norwegian historian.
- Lam Sheung Mo, 75, Hong Kong actor (Days of Tomorrow).
- Gerald Maier, 97, Canadian engineer and businessman.
- Edith Mayer, 96, American politician.
- H. Y. Meti, 79, Indian politician, Karnataka MLA (1989–1999, 2004–2007, 2013–2018).
- Yuri Nikolaev, 76, Russian television presenter and actor, cancer.
- Giuseppe Nocco, 86, Italian politician, senator (2001–2006).
- Penny Pence, 96, American Olympic swimmer (1948).
- Jacqueline Pradère, 99, French-born Andorran businesswoman (Grans Magatzems Pyrénées).
- Dietmar Salamon, 72, German mathematician.
- Krys Sobieski, 75, Polish footballer (Legia Warsaw, Dallas Sidekicks, national team).
- Anunay Sood, 32, Indian photographer and influencer.
- Marino Specia, 82, Italian Olympic rower (1968).
- Runo Sundberg, 96, Swedish actor (Hem till byn).
- Robert Taylor, 74, New Zealand guitarist (Dragon) and songwriter ("This Time", "Magic").
- Oinam Thoiba, 71, Indian Shumang Leela actor and director.
- Tika, 14, Canadian greyhound.

=== 5 ===
- Andrea de Adamich, 84, Italian racing driver (Surtees, Brabham).
- Dave Anderson, 93, Australian rower, Olympic bronze medalist (1952).
- Amaia Arrazola, 41, Spanish illustrator and muralist.
- Jean-Jacques Chardeau, 69, French singer-songwriter.
- Djamchid Chemirani, 83, Iranian musician.
- Pauline Collins, 85, British actress (Shirley Valentine, Upstairs, Downstairs, City of Joy), complications from Parkinson's disease.
- James Stevens Curl, 88, British architectural historian and author.
- Les Duff, 90, Canadian ice hockey player (Rochester Americans, Hershey Bears, Pittsburgh Hornets). (death announced on this date)
- Werner Fischer, 85, German academic, president of the Karlsruhe University of Applied Sciences (1990–2005).
- Emerich Jenei, 88, Romanian football player (FCSB, national team) and manager (FCSB).
- Jeong Jong-taek, 90, South Korean politician, MP (1981–1992).
- Saber Kazemi, 26, Iranian volleyball player (Jakarta Bhayangkara Presisi, Al Rayyan, national team).
- Lothar Klein, 69, German politician, member of the Volkskammer (1990).
- Jiří Kornatovský, 73, Czech painter, draughtsman and printmaker.
- Věra Křesadlová, 81, Czech artist, actress and singer.
- Gilson Lavis, 74, English drummer (Squeeze, Jools Holland and his Rhythm & Blues Orchestra).
- Madiassa Maguiraga, 82, Malian academic and politician.
- Annibale Marini, 84, Italian judge, member (1997–2006) and president (2005–2006) of the constitutional court.
- Abdullahi Mohammed, 86, Nigerian major general, chief of staff to the president (1999–2008), national security adviser (1998–1999), and governor of Benue-Plateau State (1975–1976).
- Tarcisio Navarrete, 71, Mexican politician, deputy (2000–2003).
- Gavin Petrie, 83, British television writer (Second Thoughts, Next of Kin, Faith in the Future) and producer.
- Barbara Ptak, 95, Polish costume designer (Pharaoh, Pearl in the Crown, The Promised Land).
- Jay Stein, 87, American theme park executive, founder of Universal Studios Florida.
- Leon Stickle, 77, Canadian ice hockey official (NHL).
- Ronald Venetiaan, 89, Surinamese politician, president (1991–1996, 2000–2010).
- Mary Ann Wilson, 87, American fitness instructor and television host (Sit and Be Fit).

=== 6 ===
- Richie Adubato, 87, American basketball coach (Detroit Pistons, Dallas Mavericks, New York Liberty).
- Abul Hassan Mahmood Ali, 82, Bangladeshi politician, MP (2009–2024), minister of foreign affairs (2013–2019) and finance (2024), kidney disease.
- Abduxoliq Aydarqulov, 82–83, Uzbek politician, hokim of Navoiy Region (1992–1995).
- Mohamed Ben Moussa, 71, Tunisian footballer (Club Africain, national team).
- Pijush Kanti Bhattacharjee, 85, Bangladeshi academic and politician, MP (1973–1975).
- Anna Laura Braghetti, 72, Italian political militant (Red Brigades).
- Mel Bridgman, 70, Canadian ice hockey player (Philadelphia Flyers, New Jersey Devils) and executive (Ottawa Senators), heart failure.
- David J. Brightbill, 83, American politician, member of the Pennsylvania Senate (1981–2006).
- Larry Caton, 77, American Olympic handball player (1972).
- Ulrich Claesges, 88, German philosopher and academic.
- Thomas Cobb, 78, American author.
- John Kristian Comer, 80, Canadian politician, Saskatchewan MLA (1971–1975).
- Naresh Dadhich, 81, Indian theoretical physicist, director of the IUCAA (2003–2009).
- Galdino Flores, 83, Mexican Olympic sprinter (1968) and long jumper.
- Paulo Frateschi, 75, Brazilian politician, state deputy (1983–1987), stabbed.
- Anatoly Frolov, 95, Russian politician, member of the Supreme Soviet of the Russian SFSR (1980–1985).
- Walter Giger, 82, Swiss chemist.
- Manfred Goldberg, 95, German-born British educator and Holocaust survivor.
- Eduardo Gullas, 95, Filipino politician, four-time representative, governor of Cebu (1976–1986), and twice mayor of Talisay, Cebu.
- Willi Gundlach, 96, German choral conductor and academic (Technical University of Dortmund).
- Mia Hamant, 21, American soccer player, kidney cancer.
- Frederick Hauck, 84, American astronaut (STS-7, STS-51-A, STS-26).
- Adam Hogg, 91, Scottish footballer (Airdrieonians, Swindon Town, Dumbarton).
- Viola Holt, 76, Dutch television presenter.
- Gillian Hopwood, 98, British architect.
- Paul Ignatius, 104, American government official and publishing executive (The Washington Post), secretary of the Navy (1967–1969) and under secretary of the Army (1964).
- Chuck Kesey, 87, American probiotic yogurt pioneer.
- Marshawn Kneeland, 24, American football player (Western Michigan Broncos, Dallas Cowboys), suicide by gunshot.
- Woodrow Lowe, 71, American football player (Alabama Crimson Tide, San Diego Chargers).
- Viktor Marynyuk, 86, Ukrainian painter.
- Pirro Mosi, 98, Albanian photographer.
- Sasha Okun, 76, Soviet-born Israeli artist, author and educator.
- Sulakshana Pandit, 71, Indian actress (Sankalp, Sankoch, Waqt Ki Deewar) and playback singer, cardiac arrest.
- Manuel Pérez, 85, Cuban film director and screenwriter (The Man from Maisinicu).
- Anka Ptaszkowska, 89, Polish art critic and art historian.
- Don Robinson, 91, British football team owner (Scarborough, Hull City) and professional wrestler.
- Roh Su-hui, 81, South Korean political activist.
- Giulio Sanguineti, 93, Italian Roman Catholic prelate, bishop of Savona-Noli (1980–1989), La Spezia-Sarzana-Brugnato (1989–1998) and Brescia (1998–2007).
- Louis Schweitzer, 83, French automotive and pharmaceutical industry executive, CEO of Groupe Renault (1992–2005) and chairman of AstraZeneca (2004–2012).
- Binlah Sonkalagiri, 60, Thai writer.
- Wendy Wagner, 52, American Olympic cross-country skier (2002, 2006), ovarian cancer.
- James Watson, 97, American molecular biologist (nucleic acid double helix), Nobel Prize laureate (1962), complications from an infection.
- Peter Wright, 79, British engineer (Lotus 79).
- Victor Yakunin, 94, Russian diplomat, ambassador to Pakistan (1985–1993).
- Wiesław Żelazko, 92, Polish mathematician and academic (Institute of Mathematics of the Polish Academy of Sciences).

=== 7 ===
- Anna Kepner, 18, American high school senior and varisity cheerleader, strangulation.
- Sion Assidon, 77, Moroccan human rights activist.
- Gisela Bock, 83, German historian.
- Thomas Childers, 78, American historian.
- Cacho de la Cruz, 88, Argentine-born Uruguayan comedian, complications from chronic obstructive pulmonary disease and COVID-19.
- Jean-Paul Diamond, 85, Canadian politician, Quebec MNA (2008–2014).
- Ismet Đuherić, 76, Bosnian paramilitary leader.
- Harvey Ferrero, 91, American architect.
- Jeanna Fine, 61, American pornographic actress, heart failure.
- Norma Helena Gadea, 69, Nicaraguan singer.
- Im Yeong-deuk, 93, South Korean politician, MP (1979–1980, 1985–1988).
- Bill Ivey, 81, American folklorist and author, chairman of the National Endowment for the Arts (1998–2001).
- Joravarsinh Jadav, 85, Indian folklorist.
- Wayne Kidwell, 87, American jurist and politician.
- Andrew Kleinfeld, 80, American jurist, judge of the U.S. District Court for the District of Alaska (1986–1991) and the U.S. Court of Appeals for the Ninth Circuit (since 1991).
- Gerhard Krempel, 94, German politician, member of the Landtag of Rhineland-Palatinate (1967–1983).
- Gerry Lively, 78, British film director and cinematographer (Hellraiser III: Hell on Earth, Return of the Living Dead 3).
- Brian Mackney, 77, Canadian professional wrestler (WWF).
- Roger McClay, 80, New Zealand politician, MP (1981–1996) and minister for youth affairs (1990–1996).
- Ernest Nycollin, 88, French politician, member (1973–2008) and president (1998–2008) of the General Council of Haute-Savoie, mayor of Taninges (1977–1986).
- Horst Panic, 87, Polish footballer (Górnik Wałbrzych).
- Roger Picard, 92, Canadian ice hockey player (St. Louis Blues).
- Zbigniew Rylski, 102, Polish lieutenant colonel and World War II veteran.
- Ans Schut, 80, Dutch speed skater, Olympic champion (1968).
- Daya Prakash Sinha, 90, Indian director and writer.
- Lee Tamahori, 75, New Zealand film director (Once Were Warriors, Die Another Day, Along Came a Spider), complications from Parkinson's disease.
- Paolo Virno, 73, Italian philosopher.
- Jerrol Williams, 58, American football player (Pittsburgh Steelers, San Diego Chargers, Baltimore Ravens), pancreatic cancer.
- Jeanette Winter, 86, American author and illustrator, heart and kidney failure.

=== 8 ===
- Mohammad Aftab Alam, 63, Nepali politician and convicted murderer, MP (1997–2002, 2018–2019).
- Antasari Azhar, 72, Indonesian politician and convicted murderer, chairman of the Corruption Eradication Commission (2007–2009).
- Robert D. Beckel, 88, American lieutenant general.
- Ntombazana Botha, 82, South African politician, MP (1997–2009).
- Lino Cerati, 87, Italian Olympic shooter (1976).
- Tony Cole, 78, Australian economist.
- Mary Cybulski, 70, American script supervisor (Life of Pi, Eternal Sunshine of the Spotless Mind) and still photographer (The Wolf of Wall Street), glioblastoma.
- Jean-Claude Guillebaud, 81, French writer, lecturer and journalist.
- Lal Muhammad Khan, Pakistani politician, MNA (2008–2013) and Khyber Pakhtunkhwa MPA (1988–1990).
- Walery Kosyl, 81, Polish Olympic ice hockey player (1972, 1976).
- Richard Lamparski, 93, American author.
- Amable Liñán, 90, Spanish aeronautical engineer.
- Barry McGann, 77, Irish rugby union player (Cork Constitution, Lansdowne, national team).
- A. J. Meek, 84, American photographer.
- Manuel Miranda, 66, American attorney and diplomat.
- Tatsuya Nakadai, 92, Japanese actor (The Human Condition, Yojimbo, Ran), pneumonia.
- Pavel Nikonov, 95, Russian painter and graphic artist.
- Vaidyeswaran Rajaraman, 92, Indian computer scientist, academic and writer.
- M. R. Reghuchandrabal, 75, Indian politician, Kerala MLA (1980–1982, 1991–1996).
- Graham Richardson, 76, Australian politician, senator (1983–1994) and minister for health (1993–1994), pneumonia.
- Josep Antoni Rom Rodríguez, 61, Spanish historian and academic, rector of Ramon Llull University (since 2022), heart attack.
- Viorel Sălan, 66, Romanian politician, senator (2016–2024).
- Vladimir Simonov, 68, Russian actor, cardiac arrest.
- Charles Stewart, 79, Scottish Church of Scotland minister, chaplain of the fleet (1998–2000).
- Rosemary Thorp, 85, British development economist.
- Geert Versnick, 68, Belgian politician, MP (1994–2010).
- Peppe Vessicchio, 69, Italian conductor and composer, pneumonia.
- Ebrahim Victory, 91, Iranian mechanical engineer.
- Gary Williams, 72, New Zealand cricketer (Otago).
- Larry Willingham, 76, American football player (St. Louis Cardinals).
- Quentin Willson, 68, English television presenter (Britain's Worst Driver, Top Gear, Fifth Gear) and motoring journalist, lung cancer.
- Cheung-Koon Yim, 88, Chinese-born Uruguayan architect.

=== 9 ===
- Lázaro Beltrán, 61, Cuban Olympic volleyball player (1992).
- Vladimir Boldyrev, 98, Russian chemist.
- Erik Bulatov, 92, Russian visual artist.
- Lorenzo Cárdenas Aregullín, 88, Mexican Roman Catholic prelate, auxiliary bishop of Tehuacán (1978–1980) and bishop of Papantla (1980–2012).
- Michael Cassidy, 88, Canadian politician, MP.
- Iftikhar Cheema, 86, Pakistani jurist and politician, MNA (2008–2018).
- Alban D'Amours, 85, Canadian businessman, president of the Desjardins Group (2000–2008).
- Stefka Evstatieva, 78, Bulgarian operatic soprano (National Opera and Ballet of Bulgaria).
- Ermanno Fasoli, 82, Italian Olympic boxer (1964).
- Walter Kern, 71, German politician, member of the Landtag of North Rhine-Westphalia (2005–2010, 2012–2017).
- Ward Landrigan, 84, American jeweler.
- Mick Lane, 99, Irish rugby union player (University College Cork, national team, British & Irish Lions).
- Lapiso Gedelebo, 87, Ethiopian historian, scholar and writer.
- John Laws, 90, Australian radio and television presenter (2UE, 2SM, Beauty and the Beast).
- Lee Ki-jun, 87, South Korean academic and politician, president of Seoul National University (1998–2002), minister of education and human resources development (2005).
- Jacques Livage, 87, French chemist.
- Klaus Madritsch, 82, Austrian politician, member of the Landtag of Tyrol (1989–2008).
- Larry McKibben, 78, American politician, member of the Iowa Senate (1997–2008).
- Zaghloul El-Naggar, 91, Egyptian geologist and Islamic scholar.
- Dave Parker, 85, Canadian politician.
- Godofredo Pepey, 38, Brazilian mixed martial artist.
- Mohammed Rafie, 79, Afghan politician and military officer, vice president (1988–1992), minister of public works (1978) and twice of defence.
- Ernst-Wilhelm Rahe, 66, German politician, member of the Landtag of North Rhine-Westphalia (2012–2017, 2019–2022).
- Göran Ringbom, 81, Swedish musician.
- Pelayo Roces, 65, Spanish politician, member of the General Junta of the Principality of Asturias (1995–2011, 2012–2015), cancer.
- John Sinclair-Hill, 91, Australian polo player.
- Susan Skerman, 97, New Zealand artist.
- Bill Slack, 92, Canadian Hall of Fame baseball coach (Winston-Salem Red Sox).
- Jana Štroblová, 89, Czech writer, poet and translator.
- Philip Sulumeti, 88, Kenyan Roman Catholic prelate, auxiliary bishop (1972–1976) and bishop (1976–1978) of Kisumu and bishop of Kakamega (1978–2014).
- Paul Tagliabue, 84, American lawyer and Hall of Fame football administrator, commissioner of the NFL (1989–2006), heart failure complicated by Parkinson's disease.
- Jeff Tobolski, 61, American politician, member of the Cook County Board of Commissioners (2010–2020) and convicted extortionist.
- Lenny Wilkens, 88, American Hall of Fame basketball player (St. Louis Hawks, Seattle SuperSonics) and coach (Cleveland Cavaliers), NBA champion (1979).

=== 10 ===
- Rudolf Adler, 84, Czech filmmaker.
- Susan Anderson, 80, American politician, member of the Wyoming House of Representatives (1991–1992) and Senate (1993).
- Herzl Bodinger, 82, Israeli military officer, commander of the Air Force (1992–1996).
- Micha Brumlik, 78, German educational theorist and publicist.
- John R. Carpenter, 87, American geochemist.
- Alwyn Crawshaw, 91, English artist.
- Richard Darbyshire, 65, English singer (Living in a Box) and songwriter ("Room in Your Heart").
- Kai T. Erikson, 94, Austrian-born American sociologist.
- Eduard Esterleyn, 90, Russian politician, senator (1994–1996).
- Antonio García-Bellido, 89, Spanish developmental biologist.
- Akira Ishimaru, 97, American electrical engineer.
- Abhinay Kinger, 44, Indian actor (Thulluvadho Ilamai, Pon Megalai, Solla Solla Inikkum), liver disease.
- Barry Knight, 87, English cricketer (Essex, Leicestershire, national team).
- Ham Lin̄i, 73, Ni-Vanuatu politician, prime minister (2004–2008).
- Bahram Moshiri, 78, Iranian historian.
- Yosam Odur Ebii, 99, Ugandan traditional ruler, paramount chief of the Lango people (2003–2024), malaria.
- Karel Oujezdský, 79, Czech radio editor, publicist and fine arts promoter.
- Jonathan Pienaar, 63, South African actor (Skin, Black Venus, Fried Barry).
- Barbara Raetsch, 89, German painter.
- Dejan Ristanović, 62, Serbian writer and computer publicist.
- Kaspar Rostrup, 85, Danish film director (Jeppe på bjerget, Waltzing Regitze).
- Thomas Daniel Schlee, 68, Austrian composer, arts administrator and organist.
- Danny Seagren, 81, American puppeteer and actor (The Electric Company, Sesame Street, Spidey Super Stories).
- Irfan Siddiqui, Pakistani journalist, writer and politician, senator (since 2021), respiratory failure.
- Hubert Skrzypczak, 82, Polish boxer, Olympic bronze medallist (1968).
- Vladimir Sloutsker, 69, Russian businessman and politician, senator (2002–2010), cancer. (death announced on this date)
- Ande Sri, 64, Indian poet and lyricist, heart attack.
- Georgy Tolstoy, 98, Russian legal scholar.
- Dorothy Vogel, 90, American art collector.
- Arfa Sayeda Zehra, 82, Pakistani educationist and human rights activist.

=== 11 ===
- Bai Suocheng, 75, Burmese politician and convicted drug trafficker, head of the Kokang Self-Administered Zone and Shan State MP (2011–2016).
- Hennadiy Balashov, 64, Ukrainian economist and politician, deputy (1998–2002).
- Jean Benoist, 95, Canadian-French doctor and anthropologist.
- George Bloom, 68, American television director (New Monkees) and visual effects artist (Pope John Paul II).
- Ingamay Bylund, 78, Swedish equestrian, Olympic bronze medalist (1984), complications from COVID-19.
- Leon Byner, 77, Australian broadcaster (5AA), leukaemia.
- Amber Czech, 20, American welder, blunt force trauma.
- Guido Di Leone, 61, Italian guitarist, heart attack.
- Anna Díaz Morello, Spanish politician, member of the Conselh Generau d'Aran (2011–2019).
- Jim Duckworth, 86, American baseball player (Washington Senators, Kansas City Athletics).
- Homayoun Ershadi, 78, Iranian actor (Taste of Cherry, Agora, The Kite Runner), cancer.
- Cleto Escobedo III, 59, American musician (Cleto and the Cletones) and bandleader (Jimmy Kimmel Live!), cardiogenic shock.
- Geoff Fox, 75, American meteorologist (WTIC, WTNH), pancreatic cancer.
- Édouard Garo, 90, Swiss musician and composer.
- Donald Graves, 76, Canadian historian.
- Susanna Gross, 58, English journalist and bridge player.
- Robert Halliday, 93, Scottish Anglican clergyman, bishop of Brechin (1990–1997).
- Imkong L. Imchen, 75, Indian politician, Nagaland MLA (since 2003), heart attack.
- Francis Jordane, 79, French basketball coach (France national team, Tunisia national team, Morocco national team).
- Joakim Karlsson, 54, Swedish musician.
- Sally Kirkland, 84, American actress (Anna, Days of Our Lives, Coming Apart).
- Gary Lakes, 75, American operatic heldentenor.
- João Chagas Leite, 80, Brazilian gaúcho singer, colon cancer.
- Marina Lewycka, 79, Ukrainian-British writer (A Short History of Tractors in Ukrainian, Two Caravans, We Are All Made of Glue).
- Kevin Mackey, 79, American basketball coach (Cleveland State Vikings, Atlantic City Seagulls, Mansfield Hawks).
- Dwanna L. McKay, 62, American sociologist and scholar, complications from Goodpasture syndrome.
- John H. Miller, 100, American Marine Corps lieutenant general.
- Carmen Moreno, 99, Polish singer.
- Helen Newlove, Baroness Newlove, 63, British community reform activist, member of the House of Lords (since 2010).
- Jack B. Newton, 83, Canadian astronomer.
- Geraldine O'Grady, 93, Irish violinist (RTÉ Symphony Orchestra).
- Bert W. O'Malley, 88, American endocrinologist.
- Franco Orsi, 59, Italian politician, senator (2008–2013), heart attack.
- Hugh O'Neill, 3rd Baron Rathcavan, 86, British hereditary peer and businessman, member of the House of Lords (1994–1999).
- Micheal Ray Richardson, 70, American basketball player (New York Knicks, Golden State Warriors, New Jersey Nets).
- Yury Sisikin, 88, Russian fencer, Olympic champion (1960, 1964).
- Imre Sooäär, 56, Estonian politician, MP (2003–2023).
- Tiong Hiew King, 91, Malaysian timber industry executive, founder of Rimbunan Hijau.
- Helen Waddell, 95, American baseball player (Springfield Sallies, Rockford Peaches, Battle Creek Belles).
- João Casimiro Wilk, 74, Polish-born Brazilian Roman Catholic prelate, bishop of Formosa (1998–2004) and of Anápolis (since 2004).

=== 12 ===
- Muazzez Abacı, 78, Turkish singer, multiple organ failure.
- Jim Avila, 70, American television journalist (ABC News, 20/20), complications from a fall.
- Freddie Baer, 73, American artist, cancer.
- Bereket Mengisteab, 86–87, Eritrean musician.
- Ronnie Dapo, 73, American actor (Room for One More).
- Kenneth G. Davey, 93, Canadian biologist.
- Gertrude Degenhardt, 85, German lithographer and illustrator.
- Dylan, 9, Argentine Rough Collie dog, presidential pet (Alberto Fernández).
- Jean Esmonin, 88, French politician, deputy (1983–1986), mayor of Chenôve (1999–2015).
- Roy Hardemon, 63, American politician, member of the Florida House of Representatives (2016–2018).
- Hồ Văn Lợi, 55, Vietnamese footballer (Cảng Sài Gòn).
- Sriyanath Karalliyadde, Sri Lankan lawyer, judge of the Court of Appeal (since 2020).
- Steve Kurtz, 67, American artist.
- Lee Yoon-soo, 87, South Korean politician, MP (1992–2004).
- Juraj Lexmann, 84, Slovak musicologist and composer.
- Juan Carlos Lezcano, 87, Paraguayan footballer (Elche, Eldense, Villena).
- Fern Michaels, 92, American author.
- Horia Moculescu, 88, Romanian pianist and composer.
- Asbjørn Rødseth, 74, Norwegian economist.
- Vera Rüdiger, 89, German politician, member of the Landtag of Hesse (1978–1987).
- Sital Kumar Sardar, 83, Indian politician, West Bengal MLA (1996–2016).
- Abba Seraphim, 77, British independent Oriental Orthodox prelate, head of the British Orthodox Church (since 1979).
- Hiroshi Sugawara, 70, Japanese film director (That's Cunning! Shijō Saidai no Sakusen?) and producer (Ruby Cairo), pancreatic cancer.

=== 13 ===
- Michael Abel, 75, American politician.
- Gerhard Allroggen, 89, German musicologist.
- Larry Brooks, 75, American Hall of Fame sports journalist (New York Post), cancer.
- Guy Cogeval, 70, French art historian.
- Géza Fejér, 80, Hungarian Olympic discus thrower (1972).
- Fosforito, 93, Spanish flamenco singer.
- Jim Jarrett, 88, American college athletics administrator (Old Dominion Monarchs and Lady Monarchs).
- Kamini Kaushal, 98, Indian actress (Neecha Nagar, Biraj Bahu, Kabir Singh).
- Claude Lecouteux, 82, French philologist and medievalist.
- Edgar Lin, 87, Taiwanese biologist, diplomat, and politician, MP (1992–1996), representative to the United Kingdom (2004–2007), and minister of environment (2000–2001).
- Gyanashree Mahathero, 99, Bangladeshi Buddhist monk.
- Sir Donald McIntyre, 91, New Zealand opera singer, Grammy winner (1983), AFNZ Icon (since 2004).
- Fabian Monds, 85, Northern Irish broadcasting executive, governor of BBC Northern Ireland.
- Juan Ponce Enrile, 101, Filipino politician, president of the Senate (2008–2013), secretary of justice (1968–1970) and twice of national defense, pneumonia.
- Joel Primack, 80, American physicist.
- Harischandra Wijayatunga, 94, Sri Lankan lexicographer and politician.
- A. Albert Yuzpe, 88-89, Canadian gynecologist.
- Efim Zubcu, 82, Moldovan politician, deputy (2001–2005).

=== 14 ===
- André Aubry, 94, French politician, senator (1968–1977), mayor of Antony (1977–1983).
- Michèle Audin, 71, French mathematician and writer.
- Xabier Azkargorta, 72, Spanish football manager (Real Valladolid, Bolivia national team, Chile national team).
- John Beam, 66, American football coach (Laney College), shot.
- Hark Bohm, 86, German actor (The Marriage of Maria Braun, Lost in Siberia, Justice), screenwriter and film director.
- Donald Brockett, 89, American attorney.
- Stephen Corey Bryant, 44, American convicted spree killer, execution by firing squad.
- Jeff Burkhart, 63, American politician, member of the Tennessee House of Representatives (since 2022).
- Joe Goodwin Burnett, 77, American Episcopalian prelate, bishop of Nebraska (2003–2011).
- Roger Burrows, 80, South African politician, member of parliament (1984–1994) and of the KwaZulu-Natal Legislature (1994–2009).
- Diego Causero, 85, Italian Roman Catholic prelate, apostolic nuncio to Chad (1992–1999), Syria (1999–2004), and the Czech Republic (2004–2011).
- John W. Colloton, 94, American hospital administrator, chief executive of University of Iowa Hospitals & Clinics (1971–1993).
- Rachel Cooke, 56, British journalist (The Observer) and writer, ovarian cancer.
- Tibor Cselkó, 94, Hungarian Olympic basketball player (1952).
- Saša Đorđević, 44, Serbian footballer (Bane, Rad, Shakhter Karagandy).
- Kenny Easley, 66, American Hall of Fame football player (Seattle Seahawks).
- John Eklund Jr., 74, American politician, member of the Wyoming House of Representatives (since 2011), cancer.
- Sharna Fernandez, 66, South African politician, Western Cape MPP (2014–2024).
- Nick Griffiths, 73, Australian politician, president of the Western Australian Legislative Council (2005–2009).
- Barry Henderson, 89, British politician, MP (1974, 1979–1987).
- Forough Jahanbakhsh, Iranian academic.
- Alice Kitchen, 83, American social worker and activist.
- Ian Marchant, 67, British writer, broadcaster and performer, prostate cancer.
- Dan McGrath, 61, American television writer (The Simpsons, King of the Hill, Saturday Night Live), stroke.
- Rebecca Mike, 73, Canadian politician.
- Philippe Morat, 88, French botanist and academic (National Museum of Natural History, France).
- Lasse Norres, 73, Finnish music and entertainment industry producer.
- Leslie Parrish, 90, American actress (The Manchurian Candidate, Li'l Abner, Portrait of a Mobster) and activist.
- Encarnita Polo, 86, Spanish singer, strangulation.
- Mohamed Sabry, 51, Egyptian football player (Zamalek, national team) and manager (Nabarouh), traffic collision.
- Matthias Schuke, 70, German organ builder.
- V. Sekhar, 73, Indian film director (Pondatti Sonna Kettukanum, Viralukketha Veekkam, Varavu Ettana Selavu Pathana).
- Guido Silberbach, 58, German footballer (SG Wattenscheid 09).
- Todd Snider, 59, American singer-songwriter ("Trouble").
- Saalumarada Thimmakka, Indian environmentalist and longevity claimant.
- Tom Timmermann, 85, American baseball player (Detroit Tigers, Cleveland Indians).
- Alice Wong, 51, American disability rights activist, complications from an infection.
- Stoyan Yordanov, 81, Bulgarian footballer (CSKA Sofia, Sliven, national team), Olympic silver medalist (1968).
- Vicente Zarazúa, 81, Mexican Olympic tennis player (1968).

=== 15 ===
- Spence M. Armstrong, 91, American general.
- Kari Buen, 87, Norwegian sculptor.
- Denis Buican, 90, Romanian-French scientist and writer.
- Greg Carlson, 77, American college football coach (Wabash Little Giants, Whittier Poets, St. Scholastica Saints).
- Francesco Cimino, 92, Italian politician, senator (1983–1992).
- Cesare Cursi, 83, Italian politician, deputy (1987–1994), senator (2001–2013).
- Víctor Delgado Mallarino, 96, Colombian police officer, director general of the National Police (1983–1986).
- Rolande Faucher, 83–84, Canadian author and community activist.
- Alejandro Frangioli, 66, Argentine racing driver, acute decompensated heart failure.
- Kjell Kaspersen, 86, Norwegian footballer (Skeid, national team).
- Mark Kaylor, 64, British Olympic boxer (1980).
- Derek Leask, 76–77, New Zealand diplomat, high commissioner to the United Kingdom (2008–2013).
- Kevin Mackin, 87, American Roman Catholic priest and academic administrator, president of Siena University (1996–2007).
- Jayne McHugh, 65, American volleyball player (national team, 1988 Summer Olympics).
- Hilly Michaels, 77, American musician (Sparks).
- Andriy Polunin, 54, Ukrainian footballer (Dnipro, St. Pauli, national team).
- Michael Reith, 77, Irish cricketer (Waringstown, national team).
- Jean-Max Rivière, 88, French singer-songwriter.
- Lorin S. Robert, 69, Micronesian politician, minister of foreign affairs (2007–2019, since 2023).
- David Rock, 96, English architect.
- Rosa Rosal, 97, Filipino actress (Child of Sorrow, Badjao: The Sea Gypsies, Blessings of the Land) and humanitarian.
- Hirokazu Shiba, 75, Japanese politician, MP (2004–2022) and Deputy Chief Cabinet Secretary (2012).
- Sören Sommelius, 84, Swedish writer and journalist (Helsingborgs Dagblad).
- Franklin Sonn, 86, South African diplomat, ambassador to the U.S. (1995–1999).
- Rod Thomas, 78, Welsh footballer (Swindon Town, Cardiff City, national team).

=== 16 ===
- Nawabzada Mazhar Ali, 80, Pakistani politician, MNA (2013–2018).
- Charlotte Bingham, 83, British author.
- F. Vernon Boozer, 89, American politician, member of the Maryland House of Delegates (1971–1979) and Maryland Senate (1981–1999).
- Bill Brady, 93, Canadian journalist.
- Bob Caudle, 95, American professional wrestling announcer (National Wrestling Alliance).
- Edward L. Cochran, 96, American chemist.
- Giordano Colausig, 84, Italian footballer (Perugia, LR Vicenza, Genoa).
- Herb Cox, 75, Canadian politician, Saskatchewan MLA (2011–2020).
- Sid Davidoff, 86, American political consultant.
- Robert L. Devaney, 77, American mathematician.
- Richard Dunleavy, 92, American naval officer.
- Xavier Emmanuelli, 87, French doctor and politician, co-founder of Médecins Sans Frontières.
- Mark Fisher, 81, British politician, minister for the arts (1997–1998) and MP (1983–2010).
- Hans Friderichs, 94, German politician, minister of economy (1972–1977).
- Paige Greco, 28, Australian para-cyclist, Paralympic champion (2020).
- Ronald Grossarth-Maticek, 85, German sociologist.
- Bandula Harischandra, 62, Sri Lankan politician, governor of Southern Province (since 2024).
- Gérard Hausser, 84, French footballer (Strasbourg, Metz, national team).
- Frank E. Kane, 93, Canadian politician.
- Yvonne Keuls, 93, Dutch writer.
- Maxon Margiela, 21, American rapper, suicide.
- François Petitdemange, 80, French karateka.
- Sara Jordan Powell, 87, American gospel singer.
- Dragoslav D. Šiljak, 92, Serbian electrical engineer.
- Dimitrios Stamatis, 75, Greek politician, MP (1985–1993, 2015–2019), minister of state (2012–2015), cancer.
- Philippe Taquet, 85, French paleontologist.
- Ian Therkleson, 87, New Zealand cricketer (Wellington).

=== 17 ===
- Michel Belotte, 92–93, French historian.
- Chen Yao-chang, 76, Taiwanese hematologist.
- Alain Cornu, 88, French footballer (Nice, Toulon, national team).
- Avishai Dekel, 74, Israeli cosmologist.
- Walter Dowdle, 94, American microbiologist.
- Paul Ekman, 91, American psychologist.
- Julio Fernández, 78, Spanish film producer, founder of Filmax.
- Violet L. Fisher, 86, American bishop.
- Newman A. Flanagan, 95, American politician and attorney.
- Bruce Gelb, 98, American businessman and diplomat, U.S. ambassador to Belgium.
- Robert Gray, 80, Australian poet, complications from Parkinson's disease.
- Murray Heimberg, 100, American medical scientist.
- Rebecca Heineman, 62, American video game designer and programmer (The Bard's Tale III: Thief of Fate, Dragon Wars), co-founder of Interplay Entertainment, adenocarcinoma.
- Ilie Ilașcu, 73, Moldovan-born Romanian politician, Moldovan MP (1994–2001) and Romanian senator (2000–2008).
- Antoni Jackowski, 90, Polish human geographer.
- Oldřich Jelínek, 95, Czech painter, graphic artist and caricaturist.
- Michael Hans Kater, 88, German-born Canadian historian.
- Alice Kessler, 89, German singer (Kessler Twins) and actress (Love and the Frenchwoman, Dead Woman from Beverly Hills), assisted suicide.
- Ellen Kessler, 89, German singer (Kessler Twins) and actress (Love and the Frenchwoman, Dead Woman from Beverly Hills), assisted suicide.
- Grigoriy Korchmar, 77, Russian pianist and composer.
- Bernard Larmande, 84, French actor (Fanny, Fallait pas !..., I as in Icarus).
- Andria Lawrence, 89, British actress (On the Buses, Coronation Street, Man About the House) and writer.
- Sven Lindman, 83, Swedish football player (Djurgården, national team) and manager (Karlstad BK).
- Ma Zhencheng, 91, Chinese translator.
- Jards Macalé, 82, Brazilian singer-songwriter, cardiac arrest.
- Ken Nielsen, 83, Canadian football player (Winnipeg Blue Bombers).
- Elzie Odom, 96, American politician, mayor of Arlington, Texas (1997–2003).
- Iris Peterson, 104, American flight attendant.
- Jean-Marie Petitclerc, 72, French Catholic priest, suicide by drowning.
- David Pryce-Jones, 89, British commentator, author (The Closed Circle: An Interpretation of the Arabs) and historian.
- Tōru Rokkawa, 68, Japanese football journalist, lung cancer.
- Humane Sagar, 34, Indian playback singer (Baby, Kabula Barabula, Tu Mo Hero), liver failure.
- M. Motiur Rahman Talukdar, 78, Bangladeshi politician, MP (2001–2008).
- Jean-Louis Trudel, 58, Canadian science fiction author.
- A. Vellayan, 72, Indian conglomerate industry executive, chairman of Murugappa Group (2009–2018).
- Marcos Vizcaya Retana, 78, Spanish politician, deputy (1977–1986).
- Willis Whichard, 85, American politician and jurist, justice of the North Carolina Supreme Court (1986–1998) and member of the North Carolina Senate (1975–1980) and House of Representatives (1971–1975).
- DeWitt S. Williams, 86, American temperance lobbyist and author.

=== 18 ===
- Anneli Aejmelaeus, 77, Finnish biblical scholar.
- William A. Bardeen, 84, American physicist.
- Guido Bastianini, 80, Italian papyrologist and palaeographer.
- Maureen U. Beecher, 90, Canadian historian and editor, assisted suicide.
- Randy Burke, 70, American football player (Baltimore Colts).
- Gianfredo Camesi, 85, Swiss painter.
- André Chandernagor, 104, French jurist and politician, deputy (1958–1981), mayor of Mortroux (1953–1983) and president of the Cour des Comptes (1983–1993).
- Álvaro Domecq Romero, 85, Spanish bullfighter and cattle breeder, founder of the Royal Andalusian School of Equestrian Art.
- Camille Dufour, 100, French trade unionist and politician, mayor of Le Creusot (1977–1995).
- Levent Erdoğan, 66, Turkish Olympic wrestler.
- Okechukwu Ezea, 62, Nigerian politician, senator (since 2023).
- Alekos Flambouraris, 87, Greek politician, minister of state (2015–2019) and MP (2015–2023).
- Otacílio Gonçalves, 85, Brazilian football manager (Internacional, Paraná, Kuwait national team).
- Madvi Hidma, 44, Indian Naxalite-Maoist militant, shot.
- Sid Jensen, 78, Canadian Olympic gymnast (1968).
- Randy Jones, 75, American baseball player (San Diego Padres, New York Mets).
- Zaher el-Khatib, 85, Lebanese politician, MP (1971–2005).
- Spencer Lofranco, 33, Canadian actor (Gotti, Unbroken, Jamesy Boy).
- Mohamed Maaroufi, 76, Moroccan footballer (Difaa El Jadida, Nîmes Olympique, national team).
- Punji Mara, 81, Indian politician, Arunachal Pradesh MLA (1995–1999, 2009–2019), complications from a stroke.
- Oleksandr Motsia, 75, Ukrainian archaeologist and medievalist, member of NASU Institute of Archaeology.
- Alevtina Olyunina, 83, Russian cross-country skier, Olympic champion and silver medalist (1972).
- Yevgeni Petrov, 87, Russian sports shooter, Olympic champion (1968).
- J. J. Michel Robert, 87, Canadian judge and politician, president of the Liberal Party (1986–1990), chief justice of Quebec (2002–2011).
- Ian Ross, 57, Canadian playwright.
- Siegfried Susser, 72, German footballer (1. FC Nürnberg, SC Freiburg, Stuttgarter Kickers).
- Per Tresselt, 88, Norwegian diplomat.
- Joe Walsh, 79, Australian rugby league player (Balmain Tigers), cancer.

=== 19 ===
- Walt Aldridge, 70, American singer-songwriter (The Shooters).
- Jim Allen, 87, Australian archaeologist.
- Timothy App, 78, American painter and educator.
- Juana Arce, 90, Spanish politician, senator (1977–1979), deputy (1979–1982).
- Jorge Bátiz, 91, Argentine road and track cyclist.
- Prakash Bhandari, 89, Indian cricketer (national team).
- Francisco Centelles, 64, Cuban Olympic high jumper (1980).
- Carl Ciarfalio, 72, American actor and stuntman (The Fantastic Four, Casino, In the Line of Fire).
- Charles Cicchetti, 82, American economist, cancer.
- William Coleridge, 5th Baron Coleridge, 88, British hereditary peer, member of the House of Lords (1994–1999), complications of a fall.
- Ronald Davis, 88, American painter.
- Boubacari Dicko, 70, Burkinabe politician, emir of Djibo (since 1987) and member of National Assembly (1992–?).
- Vitalii Drobinskyi, 89, Ukrainian politician, MP (1990–1994).
- Fred Durhal Jr., 73, American politician, member of the Michigan House of Representatives (2002, 2009–2014).
- Jean-Claude Éloy, 87, French composer.
- André Geraissati, 74, Brazilian guitarist and composer.
- Dumitru Gherman, 70, Romanian politician, deputy (2017–2020), cancer.
- Alun Gibbard, 65, Welsh writer.
- Dieter Herzog, 79, German footballer (Fortuna Düsseldorf, Bayer 04 Leverkusen, West Germany national team), world champion (1974).
- Jean-François Humbert, 73, French politician, president of the Regional Council of Franche-Comté (1998–2004), senator (1998–2014).
- Roza Jalilova, 96, Azerbaijani dancer.
- Heorhii Khodorovskyi, 87, Ukrainian politician, deputy (1990–1994).
- Lê Dũng Tráng, 78, Vietnamese-born French mathematician.
- Gerti Möller, 95, German singer.
- Magne Myrmo, 82, Norwegian cross-country skier, Olympic silver medallist (1972).
- José Navarro Grau, 90, Peruvian politician, minister of education (1965–1966) and mayor of Chincha Alta (1993–2002, 2007–2010).
- Josep Rius-Camps, 92, Spanish Roman Catholic priest and biblical scholar.
- Inge Schell, 86, German Olympic hurdler.
- Bart Shirley, 85, American baseball player (Los Angeles Dodgers, New York Mets).
- Masaharu Udō, 81, Japanese politician, member of the House of Councillors (1992–1995).

=== 20 ===
- Al Andrews, 80, American football player (Buffalo Bills).
- Segun Awolowo, 62, Nigerian lawyer, executive director of the Export Promotion Council (2013–2021).
- Claudio Azzolini, 85, Italian politician, president of UFE (1996–1998).
- David Azzopardi, 72, Maltese footballer (Sliema Wanderers, national team).
- Pelayo Correa, 98, Colombian pathologist.
- Milan Čuda, 86, Czech volleyball player, Olympic silver medallist (1964).
- Akilong Diabone, 70, Senegalese Olympic judoka (1980, 1988).
- Stephen Downing, 87, American screenwriter (MacGyver, Walking Tall, F/X: The Series) and journalist.
- Neil French, 81, British advertising executive, stroke.
- Robert Goldberg, 81, American plant molecular biologist.
- Willi Halder, 67, German politician, member of the Landtag of Baden-Württemberg (2011–2021).
- Frank Hanrahan, 87, Australian footballer (St Kilda).
- Helme Heine, 84, German writer.
- Mohammed Matiul Islam, 95, Bangladeshi diplomat and civil servant.
- Branko Ivanda, 83, Croatian film director (Gravitation, Court Martial, A Crime in a School).
- Branislav Ivković, 73, Serbian politician, minister of science (1998–2000) and MP (1996–2000, 2001–2004).
- Miloud Khetib, 80, Algerian-born French actor.
- Ruth Kiew, 79, British botanist.
- Raymond M. Kisor, 94, American politician.
- Zdeněk Konečný, 89, Czech Olympic basketball player (1960).
- Anti Liiv, 79, Estonian psychiatrist and politician, MP (1995–2003).
- Mani, 63, English rock bassist (The Stone Roses, Primal Scream).
- John Maxton, Baron Maxton, 89, British politician, MP (1979–2001) and member of the House of Lords (2004–2025).
- Mark Mellman, 70, American pollster and political consultant (Democratic Majority for Israel).
- Paul Mwazha, 107, Zimbabwean clergyman.
- Colin Nelson, 87, English footballer (Sunderland, Mansfield Town).
- Petru Pascari, 96, Moldovan politician, prime minister (1970–1976, 1990).
- Tommy Recco, 91, French convicted serial killer.
- Carlos Sánchez Romero, 55, Mexican politician, deputy (2012–2015), heart attack.
- Sudhakar Singh, 67, Indian politician, Uttar Pradesh MLA (since 2023).
- Chester Talton, 84, American bishop.
- Leonora van den Heever, 99, South African justice, judge of the High Court (1969–1990) and Supreme Court of Appeal (1991–1996).
- Yuriy Yeliseyev, 76, Ukrainian football player (Zorya Luhansk, Soviet Union national team) and manager (Zorya Luhansk), Olympic bronze medalist (1972).

=== 21 ===
- Jón Ásgeirsson, 97, Icelandic composer.
- Wilfried Auerbach, 65, Austrian Olympic rower (1980, 1984).
- Breda Babošek, 74, Slovenian Olympic high jumper (1972).
- Lowell E. Baier, 85, American environmental historian.
- Leon Bates, 76, American classical pianist.
- Costa Botes, 66, New Zealand film director (Forgotten Silver), cancer.
- Paul Costelloe, 80, Irish fashion designer.
- Hazel Walford Davies, 85, Welsh academic and author.
- Wayne Devlin, 81, Australian Olympic boxer (1972, 1976).
- Gregor Duncan, 75, Scottish Episcopalian bishop, bishop of Glasgow and Galloway (2010–2018).
- Brian David Ellis, 96, Australian philosopher.
- Miriam Feirberg, 74, Israeli politician, mayor of Netanya (since 1998).
- Fernando Bale, 12, Australian racing greyhound.
- Llyn Foulkes, 91, American visual artist.
- Margit Frenk, 100, German-born Mexican philologist.
- Teodor Gotszalk, 59, Polish scientist and academic (Wrocław University of Science and Technology).
- Siegfried Grossmann, 95, German theoretical physicist.
- Jean Guidoni, 74, French singer and songwriter.
- Jonas Hallberg, 80, Swedish journalist.
- David Hanly, 81, Irish writer and radio broadcaster (Morning Ireland).
- Kenneth F. Harper, 94, American politician, secretary of state of Kentucky (1971–1972) and member of the Kentucky House of Representatives (1964–1968, 1982–1995).
- Pierre Hérisson, 80, French politician.
- Shane Hill, 59, Australian politician, Western Australia MLA (2001–2008).
- Denys Hobson, 74, South African cricketer (Eastern Province, Western Province).
- Roly Howard, 90, English football manager (Marine).
- Jellybean Johnson, 69, American musician (The Time), songwriter ("Criticize"), and record producer ("Black Cat").
- Malcolm Lesiter, 88, English curate, archdeacon of Bedford (1993–2003).
- Peter Lindenfeld, 100, Austrian-born American physicist.
- Gerald Matticks, 85, Canadian gangster.
- Fernando Naranjo, 77, Ecuadorian politician, prefect of Tungurahua Province (2000–2019).
- Seoirse Ó Dochartaigh, 79, Irish musician.
- Leila Pärtelpoeg, 98, Estonian architect.
- Philip Perkis, 90, American photographer.
- Michele Pollesel, 76, Canadian Anglican bishop, pancreatic cancer.
- James F. Rill, 92, American attorney.
- Rodney Rogers, 54, American basketball player (Denver Nuggets, Los Angeles Clippers, Phoenix Suns), complications from spinal cord injury.
- June Swann, 95–96, British footwear historian.
- Doru Toma, 68, Romanian footballer (Argeș Pitești, Chimia Râmnicu Vâlcea, Dacia Pitești).
- Ian Turnbull, 90, Canadian politician, Manitoba MLA (1969–1977).
- Max Urick, 85, American football coach (Wabash Little Giants) and athletic director (Iowa State Cyclones, Kansas State Wildcats).
- Ornella Vanoni, 91, Italian singer ("Senza fine", "L'appuntamento") and actress (Duel of the Titans), heart attack.
- Lamarr Wilson, 48, American internet personality, suicide by asphyxiation.
- Sir Po-shing Woo, 96, Hong Kong solicitor and politician, MUC (1967–1971).
- Eli Zeira, 97, Israeli military intelligence officer.

=== 22 ===
- William Addo, 72, Ghanaian actor.
- Robert Birenbaum, 99, French resistance fighter.
- Jonathan Farwell, 93, American actor (The Young and the Restless, The Doctors, The Edge of Night), complications from hip fracture.
- Toshio Gotō, 87, Japanese film director (Beauty), lymphoma.
- Skye Gyngell, 62, Australian chef and food editor (Vogue), cancer.
- Ko Lay Inwa Gonyi, 89, Burmese poet.
- Annegret Kroniger, 73, German sprinter, Olympic silver medalist (1976).
- André Libik, 93, Hungarian film producer (Titanic - Nachspiel einer Katastrophe, Der Mann, der sich in Luft auflöste).
- Roland Littlewood, 78, British anthropologist and psychiatrist.
- Allan Moffat, 86, Canadian-born Australian racing driver, complications from Alzheimer's disease.
- Joseph K. Munyao, 85, Kenyan politician, MP (1975–1979, 1983–1988, 2003–2007).
- Dadou Pasquet, 72, Haitian singer-songwriter and guitarist (Magnum Band, Tabou Combo).
- Jamie T. Phelps, 84, American theologian.
- Claude Pringalle, 94, Belgian-born French politician, three-time deputy, mayor of Séranvillers-Forenville (1977–2008).
- Nuria Quevedo, 87, Spanish painter and graphic artist.
- Richard H. Shultz, 78, American scholar.
- Tamilanban, 92, Indian poet.
- Rosalie Tennison, 67, Canadian author and journalist.
- Paul Tremmel, 96, German poet.
- Gennady Voronin, 83, Russian economist and politician, president of Gosstandart (1997–2001).
- Huba Wass de Czege, 84, Hungarian-born American military officer.

=== 23 ===
- Suhail Bahwan, 86, Omani conglomerate industry executive.
- Noureddine Ben Ayed, 73, Tunisian actor (Man of Ashes).
- H. Rap Brown, 82, American civil rights activist and convicted murderer, chairman of the Student Nonviolent Coordinating Committee (1967–1968).
- Antonio Buonomo, 92, Italian percussionist.
- Byeon Yung-jeon, 85, South Korean politician, MP (1996–2004, 2008–2012).
- Domenico Caruso, 92, Italian poet and writer.
- Margaretta D'Arcy, 91, Irish actress, writer and activist.
- Ihor Duda, 85, Ukrainian art historian.
- Sir Terence English, 93, South African-born English cardiac surgeon, complications from a stroke.
- Michail Grobman, 86, Russian-born Israeli poet and painter.
- Jenő Hámori, 92, Hungarian fencer, Olympic champion (1956).
- Khizer Hayat, 86, Pakistani cricketer (Punjab, Pakistan Railways) and umpire.
- David Heathcote, 94, British artist, collector and academic.
- Jim Jacumin, 89, American politician, member of the North Carolina Senate (2005–2011).
- Ana Victoria Jiménez, 84, Mexican photographer and feminist activist.
- Alistar Jordan, 76, New Zealand cricketer (Central Districts, Cambridgeshire).
- Ljiljana Jorgovanović, 66, Serbian songwriter.
- Kumari Kamala, 91, Indian dancer and actress (Ekambavanan, Mohana Sundaram, Bhookailas).
- Fergus Kerr, 94, Scottish Catholic priest.
- Udo Kier, 81, German actor (Flesh for Frankenstein, My Own Private Idaho, Blade).
- Alex Kirby, 86, British journalist, cancer.
- Mikuláš Krnáč, 78, Slovak Olympic footballer (1968).
- Nancy Lane Perham, 89, Canadian cell biologist and artist.
- Yoro Lamine Ly, 37, Senegalese footballer (Shirak, national team).
- Vanes Martirosyan, 39, Armenian-born American Olympic boxer (2004), skin cancer.
- Dave Morehead, 82, American baseball player (Boston Red Sox, Kansas City Royals).
- René Passet, 99, French economist.
- Kevin Ryan, 73, American politician, member of the Connecticut House of Representatives (since 1993).
- Valentina Sharykina, 85, Russian actress (Yeltsin: Three Days in August, July Rain, Down House).
- Nikita Simonyan, 99, Russian football player (Spartak Moscow, Soviet Union national team) and manager (Soviet Union national team), Olympic champion (1956).
- Haytham Ali Tabatabai, 56–57, Lebanese militant, commander of Hezbollah, airstrike.
- Phil Upchurch, 84, American jazz and blues guitarist.
- Wang Huo, 101, Chinese novelist and journalist.
- Liliya Yudina, 96, Russian actress (May Nights, Behind the Footlights).

=== 24 ===
- László Ábrahám, 82, Hungarian lawyer.
- Abu Ali, 79, Nigerian brigadier general and politician, governor of Bauchi State (1990–1992).
- George Altman, 92, American baseball player (Chicago Cubs, Tokyo / Lotte Orions).
- Ione Borges, 73, Brazilian television presenter (TV Gazeta).
- Jimmy Cliff, 81, Jamaican Hall of Fame reggae singer-songwriter ("Many Rivers to Cross", "You Can Get It If You Really Want") and actor (The Harder They Come), pneumonia.
- James Como, 78, American literary scholar, heart failure.
- Dharmendra, 89, Indian actor (Ayee Milan Ki Bela, Mera Gaon Mera Desh, Life in a... Metro) and politician, MP (2004–2009), heart disease.
- Viola Fletcher, 111, American civil rights activist, survivor of the Tulsa race massacre.
- Jill Freud, 98, British actress (Torchy the Battery Boy, Love Actually), inspiration for Lucy Pevensie.
- Bettye Frink, 92, American politician, Alabama secretary of state (1959–1963) and state auditor (1963–1967, 1975–1983).
- Mikhail Gorshkov, 74, Russian sociologist.
- Donald Havioyak, 75, Canadian politician, Nunavut MLA (1999–2004). (death announced on this date)
- Jodie Haydon, 80, American politician, member of the Kentucky House of Representatives (1997–2005).
- Dave Hewitt, 64, Scottish writer (The Angry Corrie).
- Derek Holmes, 86, Canadian ice hockey player (Wembley Lions), administrator and scout (Hockey Canada).
- Loraine Hutchins, 77, American bisexual rights and feminist activist (Bi Any Other Name).
- Lars Johanson, 89, Swedish Turkologist.
- Stephen Kanitz, 79, Brazilian economist and political columnist (Revista Veja).
- Pamela Kola, 82, Kenyan children's author and educator.
- Jorga Kotrbová, 78, Czech actress (Princess Goldilocks, Honza málem králem, Utrpení mladého Boháčka).
- Sergei Krestenenko, 69, Russian football player (Dynamo Moscow, Lokomotiv Moscow) and manager (Fakel Voronezh).
- David M. Malone, 71, Canadian author.
- Thomas McMahon, 89, English Roman Catholic prelate, bishop of Brentwood (1980–2014).
- Juan José Mussi, 84, Argentine politician, member of the Buenos Aires Province Chamber of Deputies (2013–2017).
- Heribert Offermanns, 88, German chemist.
- Park Sang-gyu, 89, South Korean politician, MP (1996–2004).
- Ronny Pasla, 78, Indonesian footballer (PSMS Medan, Persija Jakarta, national team).
- Sonja Prétôt, 94, Swiss Olympic sprinter.
- Rags to Riches, 21, American racehorse, Belmont Stakes winner (2007).
- David Rusk, 85, American politician, mayor of Albuquerque (1977–1981).
- Jack Shepherd, 85, English actor (Wycliffe, Bill Brand, Wonderland).
- Randy Tyree, 85, American politician, mayor of Knoxville (1976–1983).

=== 25 ===
- Bernardo Álvarez Afonso, 76, Spanish Roman Catholic prelate, bishop of San Cristóbal de La Laguna (2005–2024), complications from amyotrophic lateral sclerosis.
- David Barioni, 67, Brazilian businessman.
- Bernard Besret, 90, French theologian.
- Diwakar Bhatt, 79, Indian politician, Uttarakhand MLA (2007–2012).
- Biyouna, 73, Algerian singer and actress (Bacon on the Side, Holiday, Belleville Cop).
- Lorenzo Buffon, 95, Italian footballer (Milan, Inter Milan, national team), cardiac arrest.
- Ric Carrott, 76, American actor (Space Academy, Dirty Sally, Barnaby Jones).
- Alicia R. Chacón, 87, American politician.
- James F. Conway, 93, American politician, mayor of St. Louis (1977–1981), prostate cancer.
- Charles W. Dyke, 90, American lieutenant general.
- Gentildonna, 16, Japanese racehorse.
- Terence Higgins, Baron Higgins, 97, British Olympic athlete (1952) and politician, MP (1964–1997) and member of the House of Lords (1997–2019).
- R. Anthony Inman, 74, American academic.
- Reginald Jackson, 71, American African Methodist Episcopal Church bishop.
- Colleen Jones, 65, Canadian curler and television personality (CBC News Network), cancer.
- Stancho Kolev, 88, Bulgarian freestyle wrestler, Olympic silver medallist (1960, 1964).
- Lee Soon-jae, 91, South Korean actor (Good Morning President, Grandpas Over Flowers, Idol School) and politician, MP (1992–1996).
- Trygve Moe, 97, Norwegian journalist.
- Guy Morançon, 97, French composer and organist.
- Johnny Newman, 91, English football player (Plymouth, Exeter) and manager (Grimsby). (death announced on this date)
- Tim Prentice, 95, American sculptor.
- José Afonso da Silva, 100, Brazilian jurist.
- Valerian Sobolev, 87, Russian weapons designer.
- Gondoo U Thein Naing, 89, Burmese writer and educator.
- Theresa Anne Tull, 89, American politician and diplomat, ambassador to Guyana (1987–1990) and Brunei (1993–1996).
- Graeme Turner, 77–78, Australian academic.
- Mike Watkins, 73, Welsh rugby union player (Cardiff, Newport, national team).

=== 26 ===
- Valentina Basiul, 43, Moldovan-born Romanian journalist (Radio Free Europe/Radio Liberty), cancer.
- Dahiru Usman Bauchi, 98, Nigerian Islamic preacher and scholar.
- Donal Carey, 88, Irish politician, senator (1981–1982), TD (1982–2002) and minister of state (1995–1997).
- Judy Cheeks, 71, American singer ("Reach").
- Gary Elkins, 70, American politician, member of the Texas House of Representatives (1995–2019).
- John Fox, 78, American-born Canadian sociologist.
- Sam E. Haddon, 88, American jurist, judge of the U.S. District Court for Montana (since 2001).
- Eugene Hasenfus, 84, American CIA operative (Iran–Contra affair), cancer.
- Grant Hildebrand, 91, American architect and architectural historian.
- Pam Hogg, 74, Scottish fashion designer.
- William Jenkins, 88, South African-born American veterinary scientist and academic administrator, president of the LSU System (1999–2007, 2012–2013).
- Shpat Kasapi, 40, Albanian singer-songwriter, heart attack.
- Marsha Kinder, 85, American film scholar.
- Andrew Lauder, 78, British record company executive.
- Jo Luck, 83, American businesswoman, CEO of Heifer International.
- Ferdinand Maemba Liwoke, 88, Congolese Roman Catholic prelate, auxiliary bishop (1983–1987) and bishop of Lolo (1987–2015).
- Ralph Menzies, 67, American convicted murderer.
- Tommy Murray, 82, Scottish footballer (Carlisle United, Heart of Midlothian, Airdrieonians).
- Les O'Neill, 81, English football player (Darlington, Carlisle United) and manager (Workington).
- Hubert Raudaschl, 83, Austrian sailor, Olympic silver medallist (1968, 1980).
- Gail Scott, 82, Canadian journalist and television personality (Canada AM), lung cancer.
- Vsevolod Shilovsky, 87, Russian actor (Destiny, Jaguar, Once Upon a Time There Lived a Simple Woman).
- Vladimir Susin, 69, Russian football player (SKA-Khabarovsk) and manager (Lokomotiv Moscow, SKA-Khabarovsk).
- Richard Turnbull, 65, English theologian.
- Faith Winter, 45, American politician, member of the Colorado Senate (since 2019) and House of Representatives (2015–2019), traffic collision.
- Wong Choon Hin, 75, Malaysian Olympic field hockey player (1972, 1976).

=== 27 ===
- Stjepan Blažević, 83, Bosnian footballer (Sarajevo, Borac Banja Luka).
- Barry Dempster, 73, Canadian poet and novelist.
- Ann-Margaret Ferrante, 53, American politician, member of the Massachusetts House of Representatives (since 2009), pancreatic cancer.
- Francisco Gil Hellín, 85, Spanish Roman Catholic prelate, secretary of Pontifical Council for the Family (1996–2002) and archbishop of Burgos (2002–2015).
- Ian Hampton, 83, New Zealand cricketer (Central Districts).
- Richard Kindersley, 86, British typeface designer, stone letter carver and sculptor.
- Rafail Krichevskii, 89, Russian mathematician.
- Peep Lassmann, 77, Estonian pianist.
- László Lehoczki, 67, Hungarian civil defense rescuer.
- Phyllis Lee Levin, 104, American fashion journalist and author (Edith and Woodrow).
- Agnieszka Maciąg, 56, Polish actress and model.
- Vasco Martins, 68–69, Cape Verdean musician and composer.
- Yutaka Nakajima, 73, Japanese actress, colorectal cancer.
- Bodil Nyboe Andersen, 85, Danish economist, governor of the Danmarks Nationalbank (1995–2005).
- Raul Santoserpa, 86, Cuban painter and engraver.
- Robert A. M. Stern, 86, American architect (15 Central Park West, 220 Central Park South), dean of the Yale School of Architecture (1998–2016), lung disease.
- Pierre Suard, 91, French telecommunications industry executive, chairman of Alcatel (1986–1995).
- Lorenz Weinrich, 96, German historian and academic.
- Peter Whittle, 64, British politician, member of the London Assembly (2016–2021), cancer.
- Holly Wright, 84, American photographer.
- Prince Chulcherm Yukol, 78, Thai royal and military officer.
- Fuzzy Zoeller, 74, American golfer, Masters (1979) and U.S. Open (1984) champion.

=== 28 ===
- Ueli Aebi, 79, Swiss structural biologist.
- Gyula Balog, 65–66, Hungarian human rights activist.
- Henri Beaufour, 60, French businessman.
- Ingrid van Bergen, 94, German actress (Roses for the Prosecutor, Town Without Pity, The Counterfeit Traitor).
- Arne Birkenstock, 57, German film director (12 Tangos, Chandani: The Daughter of the Elephant Whisperer, Beltracchi: The Art of Forgery) and screenwriter.
- Ernie Bond, 96, English footballer (Carlisle United, Manchester United).
- Lise Bourdin, 99, French actress (The Last Five Minutes, Desperate Farewell, The River of Three Junks).
- Bill Butler, 88, American football player (Green Bay Packers).
- Natascha Heintz, 95, Norwegian paleontologist.
- Sriprakash Jaiswal, 81, Indian politician, MP (1999–2014), minister of coal (2011–2014) and state minister of home affairs (2004–2009).
- Alain Jamet, 91, French politician, co-founder of the National Rally.
- Lee Moon-soo, 76, South Korean actor (My Son, Good Morning President, Late Blossom).
- Yutaka Ōta, 69, Japanese politician, mayor of Azumino (since 2021), cardiac arrest.
- Anthony Parel, 99, Canadian historian, author and academic.
- Natalya Petrusyova, 70, Russian speed skater, Olympic champion (1980), world champion (1980, 1981).
- Kurt Presslmayr, 82, Austrian Olympic slalom canoeist (1972).
- Ken Price, 71, English footballer (Southend United, Gillingham, Reading).
- Imran Sherwani, 63, British field hockey player, Olympic champion (1988), complications from Alzheimer's disease.
- Sir John Stanley, 83, British politician, MP (1974–2015).
- Sybill Storz, 88, German medical technology executive (Karl Storz GmbH).
- Charles W. Sydnor Jr., 82, American historian.
- Dan Tolkowsky, 104, Israeli military officer and businessman, commander of the Air Force (1953–1958).
- Mario de la Torre Hernández, 85, Mexican politician, member of the Congress of Chihuahua (1977–1980) and the Chamber of Deputies (1994–1997), mayor of Chihuahua (1986–1989).
- Daniel Woodrell, 72, American novelist (Give Us a Kiss, Winter's Bone), pancreatic cancer.
- Moshe Yegar, 95, Argentine-born Israeli diplomat and historian.

=== 29 ===
- Madeleine Alingué, 60, Chadian politician, secretary of state for economic forecasting and international partnerships (2022–2024).
- Amos Bairoch, 68, Swiss bioinformatician.
- DéLana R. A. Dameron, 40, American writer and poet.
- Nigel de Gruchy, 82, British trade union official, general secretary of NASUWT (1990–2002).
- Stan Evans, 95, Australian politician, South Australia MP (1968–1993).
- Leslie Fish, 81, American folk musician ("Banned from Argo"), author and political activist.
- Klavdiya Gadyuchkina, 114, Russian supercentenarian, oldest person in Russia (since 2022).
- Kanathil Jameela, 59, Indian politician, Kerala MLA (since 2021), cancer.
- Erwin Jutzet, 74, Swiss politician, member of the Council of State of the Canton of Fribourg (2007–2016), National Council (1995–2007), and the Grand Council of Fribourg (1982–1995).
- Simon Kulli, 52, Albanian Roman Catholic prelate, bishop of Sapë (since 2017).
- Toni Lamond, 93, Australian actress (Number 96, Razzle Dazzle: A Journey into Dance, In Melbourne Tonight).
- Donald Langlands, 90, Scottish racing cyclist.
- Ludwig Minelli, 92, Swiss lawyer, founder of Dignitas, assisted suicide.
- Tomomichi Nishimura, 79, Japanese voice actor (Street Fighter, Yu Yu Hakusho, Slam Dunk).
- José Luis Olivas, 73, Spanish politician, president of the Valencian Government (2002–2003).
- José Ortega Torres, 82, Spanish poet, injuries sustained in a fire.
- Frank Pé, 69, Belgian comic book artist.
- Alonzo Saclag, 83, Filipino musician and dancer.
- Eddie Sayers, 83–84, Northern Irish loyalist.
- Seo Dong-kown, 93, South Korean lawyer, prosecutor general (1985–1987).
- Dwight Morrell Smith, 94, American academic, chancellor of the University of Denver (1984–1989).
- Sir Tom Stoppard, 88, Czech-born British playwright (Rosencrantz and Guildenstern Are Dead) and screenwriter (Shakespeare in Love, Empire of the Sun), five-time Tony winner.
- Klaus von Trotha, 87, German politician, member of the Landtag of Baden-Württemberg (1976–2001).
- Sir Andreas Whittam Smith, 88, British financial journalist, co-founder of The Independent.

=== 30 ===
- Sir John Blofeld, 93, English barrister and high court judge (1990–2001)
- Billy Bonds, 79, English footballer (West Ham United, Charlton Athletic).
- Michael Boyers, 77, English cricketer (Essex).
- Robert H. Edwards, 90, American academic administrator, president of Carleton College (1977–1986) and Bowdoin College (1990–2001).
- Bob Foster, 78, American politician, mayor of Long Beach, California (2006–2014).
- Tim Harkness, 87, Canadian baseball player (Los Angeles Dodgers, New York Mets).
- Brian Hayes, 87, Australian-born British broadcaster (BBC Radio 2).
- Robert Hung-Ngai Ho, 93, Hong Kong-born Canadian philanthropist.
- Ram Loevy, 85, Israeli film director (Bread, Close, Closed, Closure, The Dead of Jaffa) and screenwriter.
- Hege Newth, 59, Norwegian writer, cancer.
- Billy Nichols, 85, American musician and songwriter ("Do It ('Til You're Satisfied)").
- Said Assagaff, 72, Indonesian politician, governor of Maluku (2014–2019).
- Harmon Seawel, 82, American politician, member of the Arkansas House of Representatives (1999–2005).
- Dag Spantell, 75, Norwegian singer, cancer.
- M. S. Umesh, 80, Indian actor (Pillalu Techina Challani Rajyam, Katha Sangama, Shruthi Seridaaga) and comedian, liver cancer.
- Warren Williams, 85, Australian rock musician.
