= Gennady Voronin (economist) =

Russian economist and politician (1941–2025)

- Геннадий Воронин
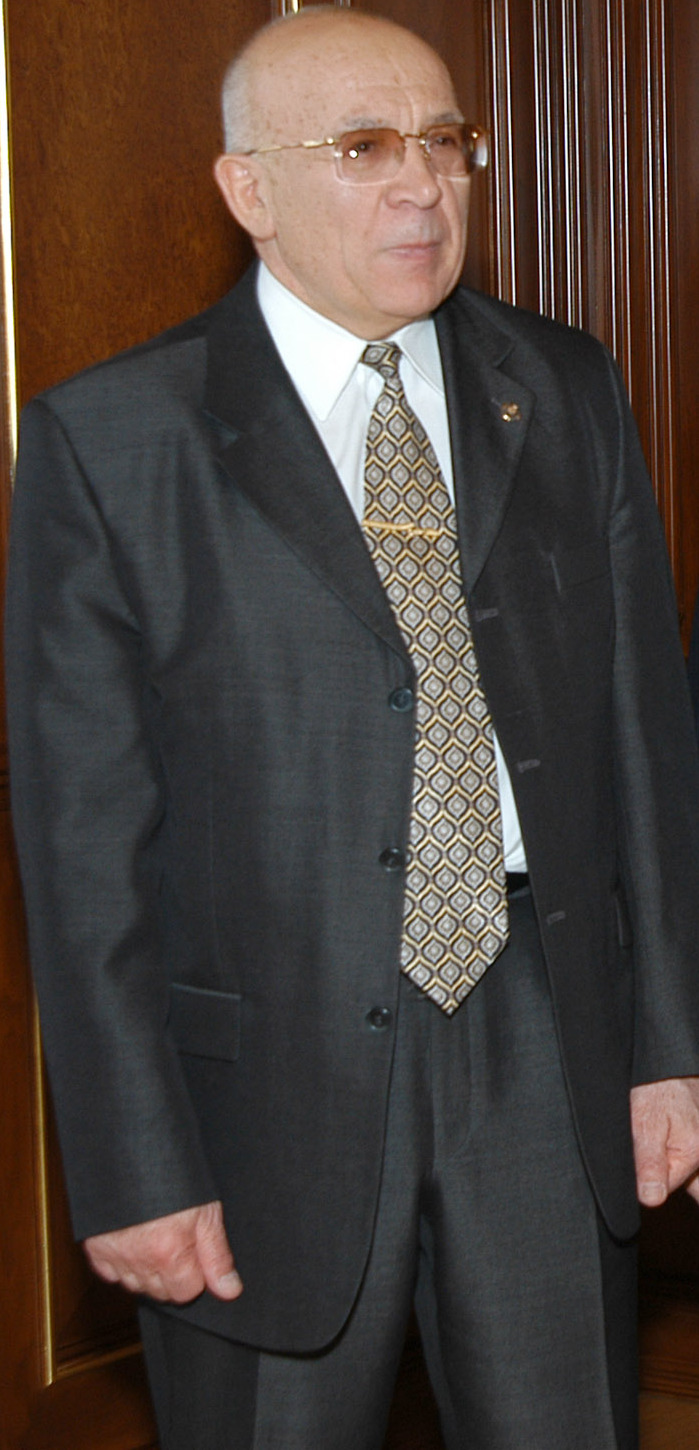
- Voronin in 2003

President of Gosstandart
- In office 3 July 1997 – November 2001
- Preceded by: Sergey Bezverkhy
- Succeeded by: Boris Aleshin

Personal details
- Born: Gennady Petrovich Voronin; 26 November 1941 Kustanayevka, Russian SFSR, USSR
- Died: 22 November 2025 (aged 83) Moscow, Russia
- Education: Ryazan Radiotechnical Institute (DS)
- Occupation: Economist

Gennady Petrovich Voronin (Russian: Геннадий Петрович Воро́нин; 26 November 1941 – 22 November 2025) was a Russian economist and politician. He served as president of Gosstandart from 1997 to 2001.

Voronin died in Moscow on 22 November 2025, at the age of 83.
