= Joakim Karlsson (musician) =

Swedish musician (1971–2025)

Nils Adolf Joakim “Jocke” Karlsson (26 October 1971 – 11 November 2025) was a Swedish musician, singer, and songwriter. He became best known as the vocalist and front figure of Pluton Svea. He was also known as the frontman of the psychobilly band Pitbullfarm.

== Biography ==
Karlsson was born in Eskilstuna, Sweden.

Over the years, Karlsson participated in several different bands and collaborated with various artists.

Between 1987 and 1990, Karlsson played drums in the white power band Pro Patria, which disbanded in 1990. Parts of the group later formed the white power band Pluton Svea, which was active from 1993 to 2000. During his time in Pluton Svea, Karlsson transitioned to being a singer and guitarist and wrote several of the band's best-known songs, including Stöveltramp, Nordmän, Nu Drar S.A. Ut, and Thailändska Småpojkar. The lyrics are filled with Nazi ideology and violence-glorifying white power messages, for example in Stöveltramp, where Karlsson sings about an impending race war in which the Aryan race is to exterminate so-called racial outsiders.

In 1998, Karlsson released a solo album titled Here We Go Again. The album includes, among other tracks, the song Förrädare, which deals with killing “undesirable elements”.

Karlsson also participated in other white power bands such as Heysel and Ledung.

In 2002, Karlsson formed the psychobilly band Pitbullfarm.

Between 2007 and 2014, Karlsson played guitar in Völund Smed. For a short period in 2011, the band appeared on the “Sörmland Top 5” chart, but was later removed after P4 Sörmland determined that the band represented values incompatible with Swedish Radio's regulations. In connection with this, Karlsson stated that he did not distance himself from his past, including his involvement in the National Socialist Front and the band Pluton Svea.

In 2016, he formed Code 291.

Karlsson died on 11 November 2025, at the age of 54.
