= Forough Jahanbakhsh =

Iranian scholar of Islam (1957–2025)

- Born: 1957; Iran , Isfahan
- Died: 14 November 2025 (aged 67–68)

Academic background
- Education: McGill University (PhD)
- Thesis: Islam, Democracy and Religious Modernism in Iran (1953--1997): From Bazargan to Soroush (1997)
- Doctoral advisor: Hermann Landolt

Academic work
- Era: Contemporary Politics
- Discipline: Islamic studies
- Institutions: Queen's University at Kingston
- Website: www.queensu.ca/religion/people/faculty/emeritus-and-retired-faculty/forough-jahanbakhsh

Forough Jahanbakhsh (Persian: فروغ جهانبخش; 1957–2025) was an Iranian professor of Islamic studies at Queen's University at Kingston. She died on 14 November 2025 after a long illness.

== Life and works ==
=== Monographs ===
- Jahanbakhsh, Forough (2001). Islam, Democracy and Religious Modernism in Iran (1953-2000). doi:10.1163/9789047400714. ISBN 978-90-474-0071-4.

=== Translations ===
- Soroush, Abdulkarim (2009). The Expansion of Prophetic Experience. doi:10.1163/ej.9789004171053.i-355. ISBN 978-90-04-17105-3.
