= Lee Yoon-soo =

South Korean politician (1938–2025)

- 이윤수

Member of the National Assembly of South Korea
- In office 30 May 1992 – 29 May 2004

Personal details
- Born: 16 September 1938 Gwangju, Keiki Province, Korea, Empire of Japan
- Died: 12 November 2025 (aged 87)
- Party: DP; NCNP; MDP

Lee Yoon-soo (Korean: 이윤수; 16 September 1938 – 12 November 2025) was a South Korean politician. A member of the Democratic Party, the National Congress for New Politics, and the Millennium Democratic Party, he served in the National Assembly from 1992 to 2004.

Lee died on 12 November 2025, at the age of 87.
