= Harald Klose =

German footballer (1945–2025)

Personal information
- Date of birth: 12 March 1945
- Place of birth: Pommer, Gau Main Franconia, Germany
- Date of death: 2 November 2025 (aged 80)
- Height: 1.82 m (6 ft 0 in)
- Position: Striker

Senior career*
Years	Team	Apps	(Gls)
1963–1968	Schalke 04	58	(7)
1968–1969	Bayer Leverkusen		
1969–1970	Berchem Sport		
1970–1973	Valenciennes		
1973–1975	AC Cambrai		
- * Club domestic league appearances and goals

Harald Klose (12 March 1945 – 2 November 2025) was a German professional footballer who played as a forward. He died on 2 November 2025, at the age of 80.
