= Oleksandr Motsia =

Ukrainian archaeologist and medievalist (1950–2025)

- Олександр Моця
- Born: Oleksandr Petrovych Motsia; 30 May 1950; Litky, Kyiv Oblast, Ukrainian SSR, USSR
- Died: 18 November 2025 (aged 75); Kyiv, Ukraine
- Education: Kiev State University
- Occupations: Archaeologist, medievalist

Oleksandr Petrovych Motsia (Ukrainian: Володимир Васильович Моргун; 30 May 1950 – 18 November 2025) was a Ukrainian archaeologist and medievalist. A member of the National Academy of Sciences of Ukraine, he was a recipient of the State Prize of Ukraine in Science and Technology (2003).

Motsia died in Kyiv on 18 November 2025, at the age of 75.
