= Franco Orsi =

Italian politician (1966–2025)

Member of the Senate of the Republic for Liguria
- In office 29 April 2008 – 14 March 2013

Personal details
- Born: 11 March 1966 Savona, Italy
- Died: 11 November 2025 (aged 59) Sassello, Italy
- Political party: DC (until 1994); FI (1994–2009); PdL (2009–2013)

Franco Orsi (11 March 1966 – 11 November 2025) was an Italian politician. A member of Forza Italia and The People of Freedom, he served in the Senate of the Republic from 2008 to 2013.

Orsi died of a heart attack in Sassello, on 11 November 2025, at the age of 59.
