= Heorhii Khodorovskyi =

Ukrainian politician (1938–2025)

- Георгій Ходоровський
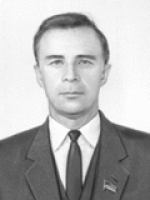
- Khodorovskyi in 1990

People's Deputy of Ukraine
- In office 15 May 1990 – 10 May 1994

Personal details
- Born: Heorhii Ivanovych Khodorovskyi; 28 August 1938 Tăuteni, Romania
- Died: 19 November 2025 (aged 87) Chernivtsi, Ukraine
- Political party: CPSU (until 1991)
- Education: Bukovinian State Medical University
- Occupation: Academic

Heorhii Ivanovych Khodorovskyi (Ukrainian: Георгій Іванович Ходоровський; 28 August 1938 – 19 November 2025) was a Ukrainian politician. He served in the Verkhovna Rada from 1990 to 1994.

Khodorovskyi died in Chernivtsi on 19 November 2025, at the age of 87.
