= Juan José Mussi =

Argentine politician (1941–2025)

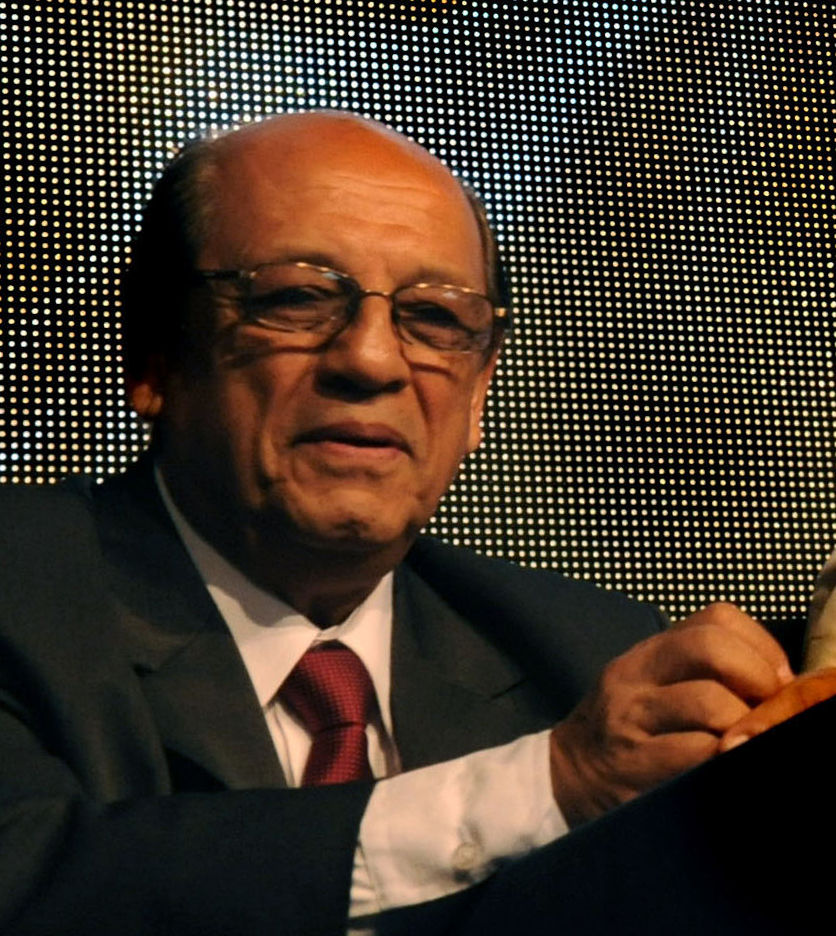
- Mussi in 2011

Member of the Buenos Aires Province Chamber of Deputies
- In office 10 December 2013 – 9 December 2017

Personal details
- Born: 9 January 1941 Berazategui, Argentina
- Died: 24 November 2025 (aged 84) Buenos Aires, Argentina
- Political party: PJ
- Education: National University of La Plata
- Occupation: Doctor

Juan José Mussi (9 January 1941 – 24 November 2025) was an Argentine politician. A member of the Justicialist Party, he served in the Buenos Aires Province Chamber of Deputies from 2013 to 2017.

Mussi died in Buenos Aires on 24 November 2025, at the age of 84.
