= Fernando Naranjo =

Ecuadorian politician (1948/1949–2025)

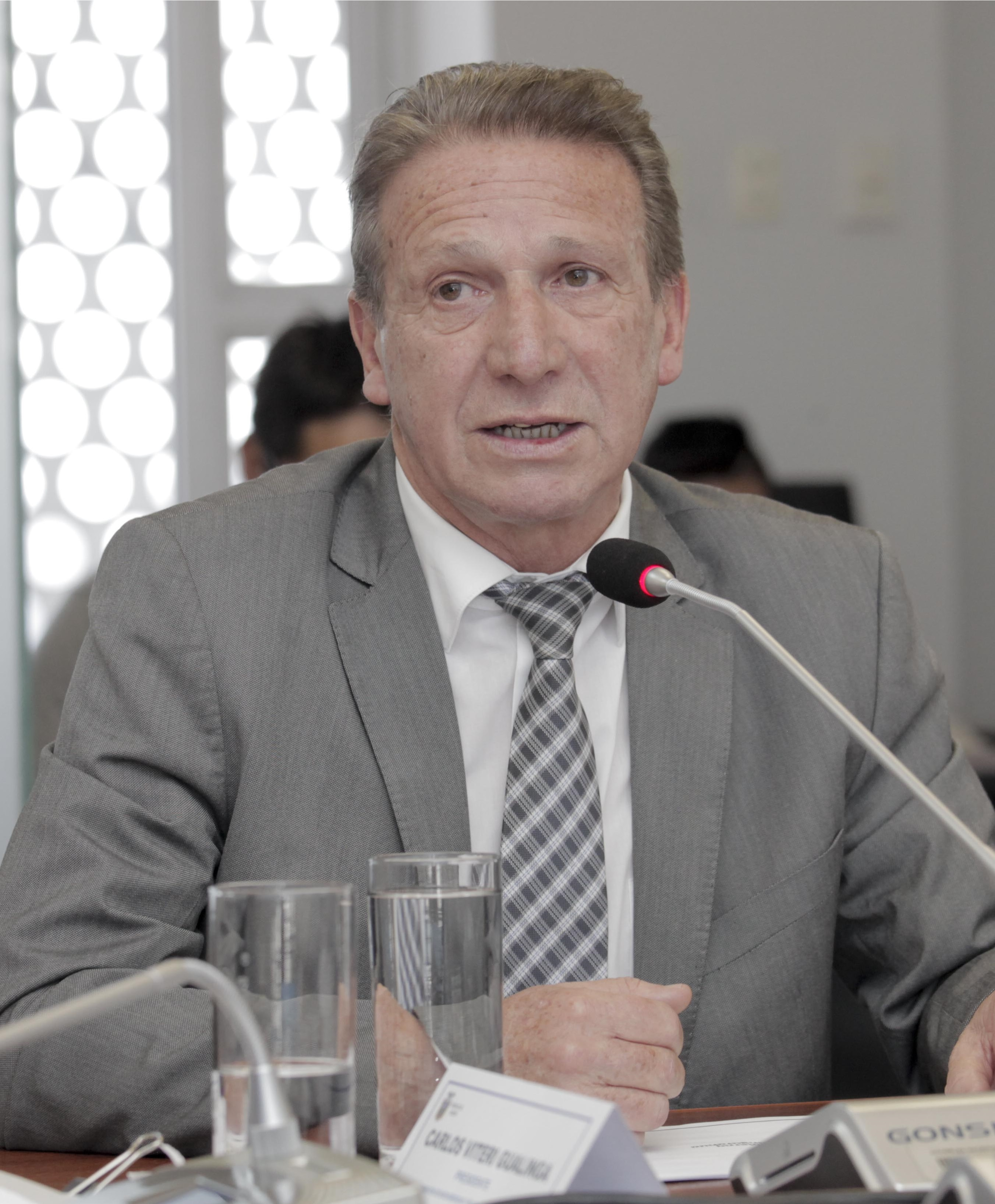
- Naranjo in 2016

Prefect of Tungurahua Province
- In office 10 August 2000 – 14 May 2019
- Preceded by: María Hortensia Albán
- Succeeded by: Manuel Caizabanda

Personal details
- Born: Luis Fernando Naranjo Lalama; 1948 or 1949 Ambato, Ecuador
- Died: 21 November 2025 (aged 77) Ambato, Ecuador
- Political party: PAIS
- Education: National Polytechnic School
- Occupation: Mechanical engineer

Luis Fernando Naranjo Lalama (1948 or 1949 – 21 November 2025) was an Ecuadorian politician. A member of the PAIS Alliance, he served as prefect of Tungurahua Province from 2000 to 2019.

Naranjo died in Ambato on 21 November 2025, at the age of 77.
