= Ian Therkleson =

New Zealand cricketer (1938–2025)

Personal information
- Full name: Ian James Therkleson
- Born: 11 October 1938; Wellington, New Zealand
- Died: 16 November 2025 (aged 87); Brisbane, Queensland, Australia
- Batting: Right-handed
- Role: Wicketkeeper-batsman

Domestic team information
- Years: Team
- 1966/67–1973/74: Wellington

Career statistics
Competition	First-class	List A
Matches	39	8
Runs scored	1,004	63
Batting average	21.82	12.60
100s/50s	0/2	0/0
Top score	71	22
Catches/stumpings	93/7	5/1
- Source: Cricinfo, 25 November 2025

Ian James Therkleson (11 October 1938 – 16 November 2025) was a New Zealand cricketer. He played in 39 first-class and eight List A matches for Wellington between 1966 and 1974.

During the 1966–67 season, Therkleson was considered to be one of New Zealand's best wicket-keepers and, helped by his batting ability, close to national selection. He was asked by the national selectors to be ready to tour Australia in 1967–68 in case any of the selected players withdrew.

Therkleson was a member of Wellington's Plunket Shield-winning teams in 1972–73 and 1973–74, his last season. He also played Hawke Cup cricket for Hutt Valley from 1959 to 1974, and was a member of the side that won the title in 1967–68. On 16 November 2025, Therkleson died aged 87.
