= Mikhail Gorshkov =

Russian sociologist (1950–2025)

- Михаил Горшков
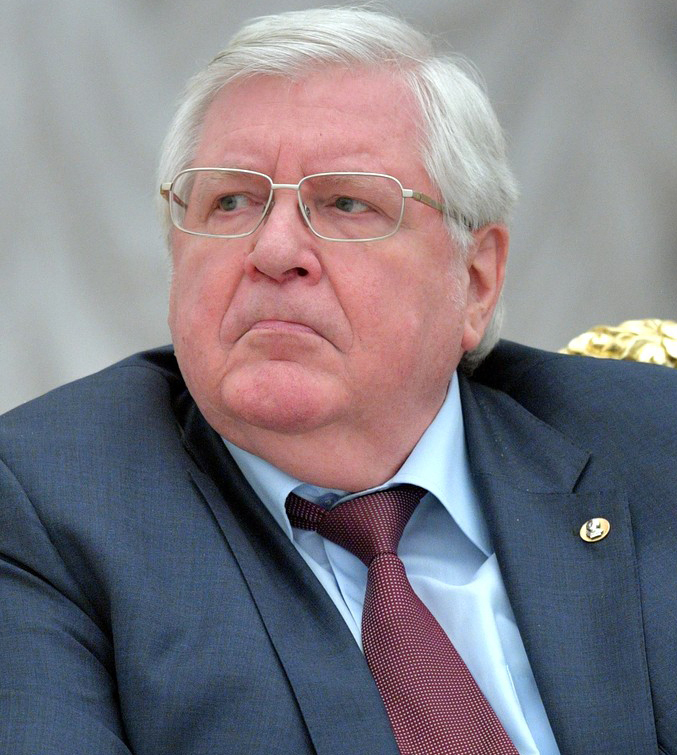
- Gorshkov in 2017
- Born: Mikhail Konstantinovich Gorshkov; 29 December 1950; Moscow, Russian SFSR, USSR
- Died: 24 November 2025 (aged 74)
- Education: Moscow Medical Stomatology Institute
- Occupation: Sociologist

Mikhail Konstantinovich Gorshkov (Russian: Михаи́л Константи́нович Горшко́в; 29 December 1950 – 24 November 2025) was a Russian sociologist. A member of the Russian Academy of Sciences, he was a recipient of the State Prize of the Russian Federation (2003).

Gorshkov died on 24 November 2025, at the age of 74.
