= Michel Belotte =

French historian (1932–2025)

- Born: 1932; Les Riceys, France
- Died: 17 November 2025 (aged 92–93)
- Occupation: Historian

Michel Belotte (French: [miʃɛl bəlɔt]; 1932 – 17 November 2025) was a French historian and schoolteacher.

Belotte taught at secondary schools in Dijon, Chaumont, and Sedan. Most of his study centered around the 18th Century. He died on 17 November 2025.

== Publications ==
- Histoire de la seigneurie de Jully-le-Châtel (aujourd’hui Jully-sur-Sarce - Aube), aux XIIIe et XIVe siècles (1955)
- La Navigation romaine à la fin de la République d'après les œuvres de Cicéron (1955)
- "Les Possessions des évêques de Langres dans la région de Mussy-sur-Seine et de Châtillon-sur-Seine du milieu du XIIe au milieu du XIVe siècle" (1965)
- Petite histoire des Trois Riceys (Aube) des origines à 1789 (1967)
- Petite histoire de la commune des Riceys : (Aube) de la veille de la Révolution de 1789 au lendemain de la Grande guerre (1968)
- La Bourgogne au Moyen Âge (1972)
- La Région de Bar-sur-Seine à la fin du Moyen Âge : du début du XIIIe siècle au milieu du XVIe siècle, étude économique et sociale (1973)
- Bar-sur-Seine durant les guerres des XIVe et XVe siècles
- La Côte-d'Or sous la Seconde République et le Second Empire, 1848-1870 (1982)
- "Le Fief Saint-Vincent. Étude des possessions des évêques de Chalon-sur-Saône aux confins du Barséquanais et du Tonnerrois (XIIIe -XVIIe siècles)"
- "Les possessions de l’abbaye du Val-des-Choux à Aignay-le-Duc" (1993)
- "Les seigneurs engagistes d’Aignay-le-Duc 1477-1789" (1994)
- "Petite histoire de Quémigny-sur-Seine" (1995)
- "l’Histoire de Bellenod et Origny des origines à 1789" (1996)
- l’Histoire de Châtillon-sur-Seine des origines à nos jours (1997)
- "l’Histoire de Saint-Germain-le-Rocheux des origines à 1789" (1997)
- "Les seigneurs de Rochefort sur Bevron des origines à la Révolution" (1998)
- "Histoire de la seigneurie de Mauvilly et ses dépendances" (1999)
- "La seigneurie d'Echalot des origines à 1789" (2000)
- "Histoire de Duesmes des origines à 1789" (2001)
- l’Histoire de Bar-sur-Seine des origines à 1789 (2003)
- "Histoire de la ferme de Grand Bois (Aignay-le-Duc) ancienne grange" (2004)
- Les trois Riceys à la fin de l'Ancien Régime (1789) : Ricey-Haut, Ricey-Haute-Rive, Ricey-Bas (2006)
- "Brève histoire d’Aignay-le-Duc" (2006)
- "La création des fermes d’Etalante (XVIe au XVIIe siècles)" (2008)
