= Noureddine Ben Ayed =

Tunisian actor (1951/1952–2025)

- نور الدين بن عياد
- Born: 1951 or 1952
- Died: 23 November 2025 (aged 73)
- Occupation: Actor
- Years active: 1986–2022

Noureddine Ben Ayed (Arabic: نور الدين بن عياد; 1951 or 1952 – 23 November 2025) was a Tunisian actor. He was best known for playing the role of Azzouz in the television series Ghada. Prominent Tunisian actor and comedian Noureddine Ben Ayed passed away today, Sunday, November 23, 2025, at the age of 73. His death comes after a long and influential career that cemented his name as a pillar of popular comedy in Tunisia and the Arab world.

Ben Ayed died on 23 November 2025, at the age of 73.

== Filmography ==
=== Film ===
- Man of Ashes

=== Television ===
- Khatini (1986)
- Bila Inwen (1987)
- Shan tounsi (1989)
- El Assifa (1993)
- Ghada (1994)
- El Hassad (1995)
- Nheb Nestahsen (1997)
- Jari Ya Hammouda (2004)
- Mal Wa Amal (2005)
- Chay Ynattak (2005)
- Mabinetna (2007)
- Maître Malek (2011)
- Familia Si Taïeb (2019)
- Ken Ya Makenech (2022)
