= Bernard Besret =

French theologian (1935–2025)

Jean-Claude Besret (16 March 1935 – 25 November 2025) known under the name of Dom Bernard then under that of Bernard Besret, was a French theologian and former Catholic priest. He broke with Catholicism in the 1970s.

Besret died on 25 November 2025, at the age of 90.

== Publications ==
- « La liturgie monastique : ses fondements théologiques », in Le Message des moines à notre temps. Mélanges offerts à dom Alexis abbé de Boquen, Paris, Librairie Arthème Fayard, 1958, p. [221]-247
- Incarnation ou eschatologie ?, Le Cerf, 1964
- Libération de l'homme, Desclée de Brouwer, 1969
- Clefs pour une nouvelle église, Seghers, 1971
- De commencement en commencement : itinéraires d'une déviance, entretiens, Le Seuil, 1976
- Confiteor, Albin Michel, 1991
- Lettre ouverte au Pape qui veut nous asséner la vérité absolue dans toute sa splendeur, Albin Michel, 1993
- Manifeste pour une renaissance, Albin Michel, 1997
- « Pourquoi je suis devenu franc-maçon », dans L'Actualité religieuse, "Les francs-maçons : Dieu et le spirituel », hors-série, nº 11, février 1998
- Esquisse d'un évangile éternel, Le Seuil, 2003
- Du bon usage de la vie, Albin Michel, 2006
- À hauteur des nuages : chroniques de ma montagne taoïste, Albin Michel, 2011
- Postface de la thèse « Boquen entre utopie et révolution 1965-1976 », de Béatrice Lebel, Rennes, PUR, coll. Histoire, 2015
- Et la mort comme le jour illumine : 9 propositions sur la mort et son au-delà, 2017 (disponible chez l'auteur)
