= Pamela Kola =

Kenyan writer (1943–2025)

- Born: 1943; Kenya
- Died: 24 November 2025 (aged 81–82)
- Education: University of Leeds
- Occupation: Writer
- Writing career
- Genres: Children's literature, folklore
- Notable works: East African How Stories; East African Why Stories; East African When Stories

Pamela Kola (1943 – 24 November 2025) was a Kenyan writer who is best known for her children's books about East African myths, legends, and fables.

== Life and career ==
Born in Ng'iya Township, Kola attended the University of Leeds, receiving a degree in Education. She ran a nursery in Nairobi. She collaborated with the East African Publishing House in the 1960s to produce a line of children's books.

== Death ==
Kola died on 24 November 2025, at the age of 82.

== Works ==
- East African How Stories (1966)
- East African Why Stories (1966)
- East African When Stories (1968)
- The Cunning Tortoise
- The Wise Little Girl
