= Sören Sommelius =

Swedish writer and journalist (1941–2025)

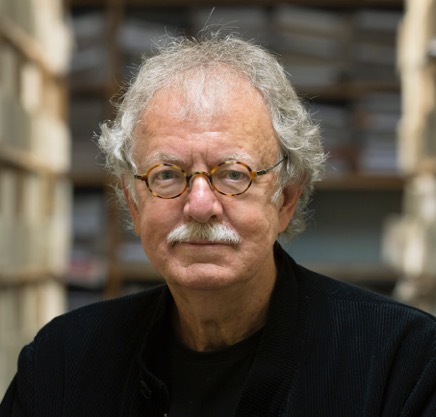
Sommelius in 2014

Sören Sommelius (23 October 1941 – 15 November 2025) was a Swedish writer and journalist, who worked as editor of the culture section of the daily Helsingborgs Dagblad. He was the author of books on India (such as Indiens kämpande Kerala), and former Yugoslavia, among them Sista Resan till Jugoslavien (1992), Kosova utan stjärna (1993), Mediernas krig i forna Jugoslavien (1993), Mot kriget and Liten guide till stort krig (with Jan Öberg).

Sommelius was a member of the TFF Conflict-Mitigation Team and has studied, in particular, the role of media in ex-Yugoslavia and the war reporting by Western media. Numerous visits to all parts of former Yugoslavia, independently and as member of the TFF Conflict-Mitigation team, which he joined in 1992.

Sommelius died on 15 November 2025, at the age of 84.
