= Pirro Mosi =

Albanian photographer (1927–2025)

- Born: Pirro Hil Mosi; 1 August 1927; Shkodër, Albania
- Died: 6 November 2025 (aged 98)
- Occupation: Photographer

Pirro Hil Mosi (1 August 1927 – 6 November 2025) was an Albanian photographer.

== Life and career ==
Mosi was born in Shkodër, Albania on 1 August 1927. He left the city at the age of seven when his father was assigned to another job in the Post Office of Tirana, later in Elbasan and finally in Sarandë, where he developed all his activities.

He continued his studies in photography and eventually became a professional photographer in the city of Sarandë. With over 40 years of activity, his archive is considered a special asset for Albanian photography.

Mosi lived in the United States, and died on 6 November 2025, at the age of 98.
