= Édouard Garo =

Swiss musician and composer (1935–2025)

- Born: 6 July 1935; Nyon, Switzerland
- Died: 11 November 2025 (aged 90)
- Education: University of Lausanne; Lausanne Conservatory; Conservatoire de Musique de Genève; Zurich University of the Arts
- Occupations: Musician, composer

Édouard Garo (6 July 1935 – 11 November 2025) was a Swiss musician and composer.

Garo was best known for establishing the Studio Kodály in Geneva in 2004 and teaching at the Opéra de Lyon school. He composed numerous works and gave presentations in Norway, Germany, Austria, Switzerland, and France, and donated his works to the Cantonal and University Library of Lausanne in 2006.

Garo died on 11 November 2025, at the age of 90.
