= Élie Lefranc =

French racing cyclist (1932–2025)

Personal information
- Born: 4 June 1932 Guerville, France
- Died: 2 November 2025 (aged 93) Guerville, France

Cycling career
- Sport: Cycling

Amateur team
- ?–?: VC Eudois et Breslois

Élie Lefranc (French: [eli ləfʁɑ̃k]; 4 June 1932 – 2 November 2025) was a French racing cyclist.

A Norman amateur cyclist, Lefranc won the Maillot des As in 1958, 1962, 1965, and 1967. His other victories included the Grand Prix Michel-Lair, the Poly Nordiste, the Circuit de la Vallée de l'Aa, and the Grand Prix de Luneray. Upon his retirement, he had won nearly 500 races.

Lefranc died in Guerville on 2 November 2025, at the age of 93.
