= Abduxoliq Aydarqulov =

Uzbek politician (1942–2025)

Hokim of Navoiy Region
- In office 28 January 1992 – 5 January 1995
- Preceded by: position established
- Succeeded by: Hayot Gʻafforov

Personal details
- Born: Abduxoliq Abdurahmanovich Aydarqulov; 1942 Gʻazalkent, Uzbek SSR, USSR (now Uzbekistan)
- Died: 6 November 2025 (aged 82–83)
- Political party: CPSU (until 1991)
- Education: Tashkent Institute of Irrigation and Agricultural Mechanization Engineers
- Occupation: Engineer

Abduxoliq Abdurahmanovich Aydarqulov (1942 – 6 November 2025) was an Uzbek politician. He served as hokim of Navoiy Region from 1992 to 1995.

Aydarqulov died on 6 November 2025.
