= Klaus Madritsch =

Austrian politician (1943–2025)

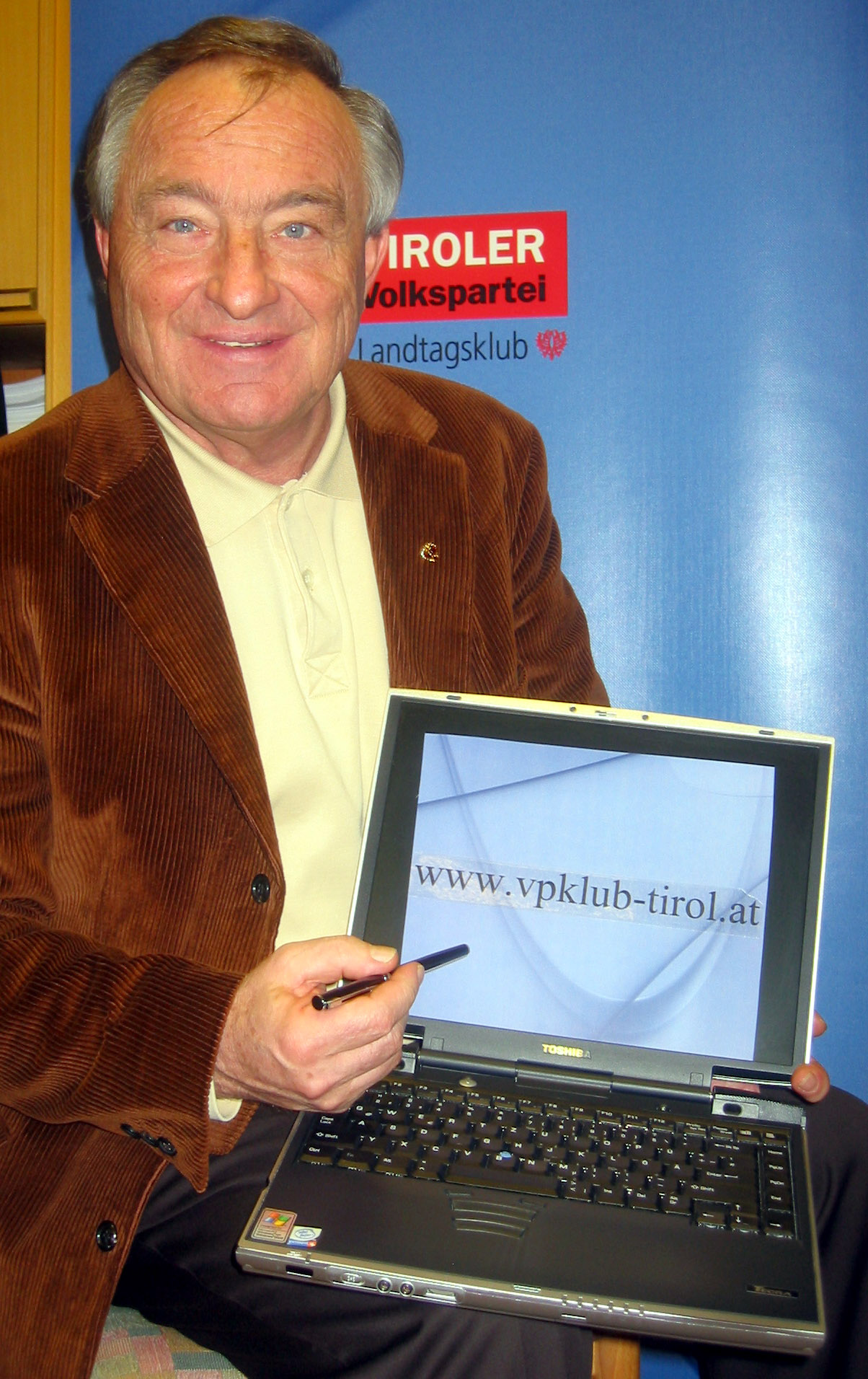
- Madritsch in 2007

Member of the Landtag of Tyrol
- In office 4 April 1989 – 1 July 2008

Personal details
- Born: 6 September 1943 Neumarkt, Italy
- Died: 9 November 2025 (aged 82)
- Party: ÖVP
- Education: University of Innsbruck
- Occupation: Schoolteacher

Klaus Madritsch (6 September 1943 – 9 November 2025) was an Austrian politician. A member of the Austrian People's Party, he served in the Landtag of Tyrol from 1989 to 2008.

Madritsch died on 9 November 2025, at the age of 82.
