= Masaharu Udō =

Japanese politician (1944–2025)

- 有働 正治

Member of the House of Councillors
- In office 26 July 1992 – 25 July 1998
- Constituency: National PR

Personal details
- Born: 28 October 1944 Kikuka, Kumamoto, Japan
- Died: 19 November 2025 (aged 81)
- Party: Communist
- Education: Kumamoto University
- Occupation: Schoolteacher

Masaharu Udō (Japanese: 有働正治 Udō Masaharu; 28 October 1944 – 19 November 2025) was a Japanese politician. A member of the Japanese Communist Party, he served in the House of Councillors from 1992 to 1998.

Udō died on 19 November 2025, at the age of 81.
