= Kustanayevka =

Kustanayevka Кустанаевка
- Selo
- Location within Amur Oblast Location within Russia
- Coordinates: 50°48′N 128°15′E
- Country: Russia
- Region: Amur Oblast
- District: Belogorsky District
- Time zone: UTC+9:00

Kustanayevka (Russian: Кустанаевка) is a rural locality (a selo) and the administrative center of Kustanayevsky Selsoviet of Belogorsky District, Amur Oblast, Russia. The population was 398 as of 2018. There are 7 streets.

== Geography ==
Kustanayevka is located 32 km southwest of Belogorsk (the district's administrative centre) by road. Tomichi is the nearest rural locality.
