= Juana Arce =

Spanish politician (1935–2025)

Member of the Senate of Spain for Albacete
- In office 15 June 1977 – 26 March 1979

Member of the Congress of Deputies for Albacete
- In office 13 March 1979 – 31 August 1982

Personal details
- Born: Juana Arce Molina; 23 April 1935 Albacete, Spain
- Died: 19 November 2025 (aged 90)
- Party: UCD; PP
- Education: University of Castilla–La Mancha; Complutense University of Madrid
- Occupation: Teacher

Juana Arce Molina (23 April 1935 – 19 November 2025) was a Spanish politician. A member of the Union of the Democratic Centre and the People's Party, she served in the Senate from 1977 to 1979 and in the Congress of Deputies from 1979 to 1982.

Arce died on 19 November 2025, at the age of 90.
