= Rubén Martínez Huelmo =

Uruguayan politician (1949–2025)

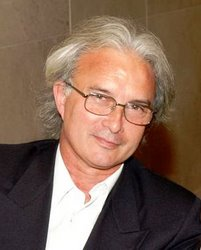
Martínez Huelmo in 2011

Rubén Martínez Huelmo (27 September 1949 – 3 November 2025) was a Uruguayan politician. He was senator from 2015 to 2020 and president of the Mercosur Parliament from 2013 to 2015.

Martínez Huelmo died on 3 November 2025, at the age of 76.
