= José Ángel Aguirrebengoa =

Spanish politician (1952–2025)

Member of the Parliament of Navarre
- In office 13 June 2007 – 14 May 2011

Personal details
- Born: José Ángel Aguirrebengoa Imaz; 1952 Alsasua, Spain
- Died: 2 November 2025 (aged 72–73) Pamplona, Spain
- Party: EAJ-PNV
- Occupation: Technical engineer

José Ángel Aguirrebengoa Imaz (1952 – 2 November 2025) was a Spanish politician. A member of the Basque Nationalist Party, he served in the Parliament of Navarre from 2007 to 2011.

Aguirrebengoa died in Pamplona on 2 November 2025.
