= Gerard Somer =

Dutch footballer (1943–2025)

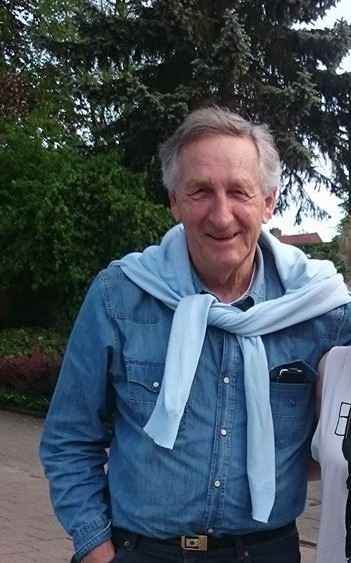

Personal information
- Full name: Gerhardus Johannes Somer
- Date of birth: 24 November 1943
- Place of birth: Deventer, German-occupied Netherlands
- Date of death: 3 November 2025 (aged 81)
- Place of death: Deventer, Netherlands
- Position: Defender

Senior career*
| Years | Team | Apps | (Gls) |
| 1963–1972 | Go Ahead Eagles | 266 | (20) |
| 1972–1975 | SBV Vitesse | | |
| 1975–1976 | Heracles Almelo | | |

Managerial career
- 1985–1986: Heracles Almelo
- * Club domestic league appearances and goals

Gerard Somer (24 November 1943 – 3 November 2025) was a Dutch football player and manager who played as a defender. He died in Deventer on 3 November 2025, at the age of 81.
