= Michael Boyers =

English cricketer (1948–2025)

Personal information
- Born: 16 April 1948; Plaistow, Kent, England
- Died: 30 November 2025 (aged 77)
- Batting: Right-handed
- Bowling: Right-arm medium-fast

Michael Boyers (16 April 1948 – 30 November 2025) was an English cricketer. He was a right-handed batsman and right-arm medium-fast bowler who played for Essex. He was born in Plaistow.

== Biography ==
Boyers, who played for Essex Second XI between 1967 and 1969, made a single first-class appearance for the side, in July 1969, against Middlesex. From the lower-middle order, he scored a duck in the first innings in which he batted, and two runs in the second.

The following month, he made a single List A appearance, against a touring Barbados team, against whom he scored 8 runs. He took a single wicket in the match, that of Arthur Bethell.

Mike Boyers was Coach of the University of Essex Cricket Club (UECC) and at the time he was one of the leading coaches in the world. The Australia Cricket Board offered him the job in 2009 prior to the Ashes but he declined the job to remain with Essex University 1st XI. He left the coaching position at the university in 2010 as a result of his deteriorating health.

Boyers was the headteacher of Warwick Boys school in East London from 1985 to 1996. He died on 30 November 2025, at the age of 77.
