= Im Yeong-deuk =

South Korean politician (1932–2025)

- 임영득

Member of the National Assembly of South Korea
- In office 13 May 1985 – 29 May 1988
- In office 17 March 1979 – 17 May 1980

Personal details
- Born: 10 April 1932 Haenam County, Korea, Japan
- Died: 7 November 2025 (aged 93)
- Political party: DJP
- Education: Seoul National University (BA)
- Occupation: Lawyer

Im Yeong-deuk (Korean: 임영득; 10 April 1932 – 7 November 2025) was a South Korean politician. A member of the Democratic Justice Party, he served in the National Assembly from 1979 to 1980 and again from 1985 to 1988.

Im died on 7 November 2025, at the age of 93.
