= Vera Rüdiger =

German politician (1936–2025)

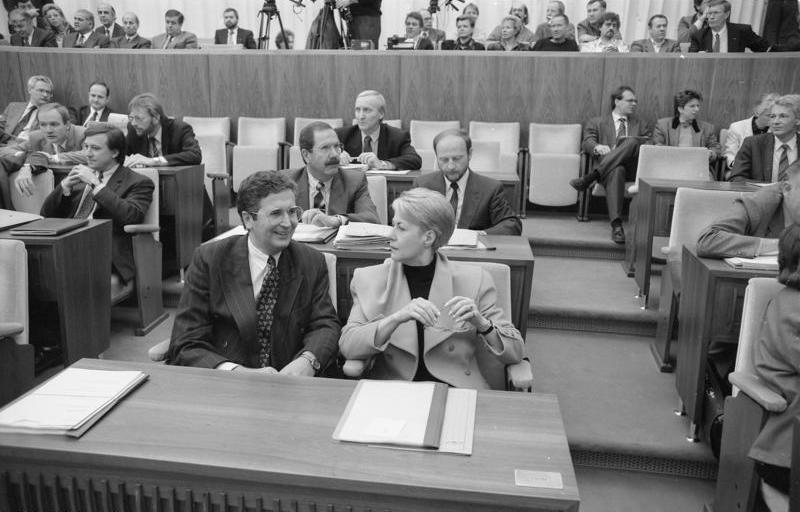
- Rüdiger (right) with Klaus Wedemeier in 1989

Member of the Landtag of Hesse
- In office 1 December 1978 – 14 October 1987

Personal details
- Born: 5 April 1936 Vollmarshausen, Gau Electoral Hesse, Germany
- Died: 12 November 2025 (aged 89)
- Party: SPD
- Education: Marburg University
- Occupation: Political scientist

Vera Rüdiger (5 April 1936 – 12 November 2025) was a German politician. A member of the Social Democratic Party, she served in the Landtag of Hesse from 1978 to 1987.

Rüdiger died on 12 November 2025, at the age of 89.
