= Alejandro Frangioli =

Argentine racing driver (1959–2025)

- Born: 19 January 1959 Resistencia, Chaco, Argentina
- Died: 15 November 2025 (aged 66) La Plata, Buenos Aires Province, Argentina

Championship titles
- 2004 2005–2006, 2018: Desafío Fiesta; Turismo Internacional

Alejandro René Frangioli (19 January 1959 – 15 November 2025) was an Argentine racing driver. He developed his sporting career at the national level, initially competing in promotional categories, before moving on to compete in Turismo Internacional, where he became one of its leading figures.

== Career ==
Initially, Frangioli debuted in the Copa Corsa one-make series, before moving on to compete in the Monomarca Gol series, a regular support series for the TC2000 Championship. He also competed in the promotional series Monomarca Kia and Desafío Fiesta, achieving his first national title in the latter, winning the opening tournament and the unified championship of 2004. At the end of 2004, Frangioli debuted in the Super Clase of Turismo Internacional, where he became one of its most successful drivers in history, winning three championships (2005, 2006 and 2018).

Alongside his sporting career, Frangioli also developed his managerial career, serving as director of the Autódromo Santiago Yaco Guarnieri between 2012 and 2016.

== Death ==
Frangioli continued to compete in Turismo Internacional until his death on 15 November 2025, when he collapsed during the final lap of a Clase 2 race at the Autódromo Roberto Mouras in La Plata as a result of a medical emergency. He was 66.
