= Renaud Revel =

French journalist (1953–2025)

- Born: 15 December 1953; Phnom Penh, French Indochina
- Died: 2 November 2025 (aged 71); Neuilly-sur-Seine, France
- Occupation: Journalist

Renaud Revel (French: [ʁəno ʁəvɛl]; 15 December 1953 – 2 November 2025) was a French journalist.

== Life and career ==
Born in Phnom Penh on 15 December 1953, Revel earned a degree in law before joining the daily newspaper L'Aurore in 1978 and Le Matin de Paris in 1981. He went on to serve as editor-in-chief of the weekly magazine Stratégies and the daily newspaper L'Express. He also had a personal blog on the online site of L'Express, which was regularly published in the newspaper's daily editions. In addition to print media, he appeared on the C8 show Touche pas à mon poste !.

Revel died in Neuilly-sur-Seine on 2 November 2025, at the age of 71.

== Books ==
- Télévision le grand gâchis (1998)
- People : le Grand Déballage (2006)
- L'Égérie : l'énigme Claude Chirac (2007)
- Johnny, les 100 jours où tout a basculé (2010)
- Dans la tourmente. Entretiens avec Renaud Revel (2011)
- Madame DSK, un destin brisé (2011)
- Les Amazones de la République (2013)
- Les cardinaux de la République (2016)
- Les Visiteurs du soir. Ce qu'ils disent à l'oreille du président (2021)
