= Jungle Phillips =

Australian artist (1956–2025)

Peter "Jungle" Phillips
- Born: 27 June 1956; Hobart, Tasmania, Australia
- Died: 1 November 2025 (aged 69); Adelaide, South Australia, Australia
- Known for: Painting
- Movement: Outsider art

Peter "Jungle" Phillips (27 June 1956 – 1 November 2025) was an Australian artist who became a prolific creator of outsider art after a brain injury in 1999.

== Early life and education ==
Peter "Jungle" Phillips was born in Hobart, Tasmania on 27 June 1956. He was born two months premature, and was raised by his father and grandparents from the age of five after his parents' divorce. His father was physically and verbally abusive, which led to a difficult childhood for Phillips and his five siblings.

Phillips created toys and bicycles out of everyday found objects, largely out of necessity, as his family were poor. He studied art at high school, although did not continue with it.

Phillips later followed his brothers to Melbourne, where they joined a motorcycle gang. Where he found a "brotherhood" and was given the nickname "Jungle", which was bikie slang for a scatterbrain.

Phillips again found art in his 20s, after witnessing the suicide of his brother in 1978. He entered a psychiatric facility, where he was advised to draw. However, he succumbed to drug and alcohol abuse in the 1980s.

== Career ==
In 1991, Phillips moved to Adelaide, South Australia, to escape the bikie lifestyle, substance abuse issues, and violence. In 1992, he began to paint, with the help of friend and artist Tony Waite. In 1999, he obtained a brain injury when he was the victim of a hit and run, after which he started painting prolifically, often working on hundreds of paintings at once.

Phillips was influenced by the work of Pablo Picasso, Salvador Dalí, Arthur Boyd, Sydney Nolan, and Ian Fairweather. With his art being largely colourful and hopeful, and described as expressionist and an example of outsider art.

He received critical acclaim, in 2005 becoming the first Australian to exhibit at the Musée de la Création Franche in France. In Australia, he would regularly exhibit at the South Australian Living Artists festival and was a finalist in the 2017 National Self Portrait Competition.

== Personal life and death ==
Phillips was diagnosed with schizophrenia, which led to his painting becoming more hopeful, due to a wish to avoid negative topics. In his later years he was diagnosed with terminal liver cancer, which reduced his painting output to only 3–5 paintings at a time.

Phillips died in his Adelaide home on 1 November 2025.
