= Robert H. Romer =

American physicist

- Born: Robert Horton Romer; April 15, 1931; Chicago, Illinois, U.S.
- Died: November 2, 2025 (aged 94); Amherst, Massachusetts, U.S.
- Education: Amherst College; Princeton University
- Occupation: Physicist
- Spouse(s): Diana Hayes (m. 1953; died. 1992) Betty Steele (m. 1994)

Robert Horton Romer (April 15, 1931 – November 2, 2025) was an American physicist.

== Life and career ==
Romer was born in Chicago, Illinois, the son of Alfred Sherwood Romer and Ruth Hibbard. He was raised in Cambridge, Massachusetts, and attended Amherst College, earning his BA degree in 1952. He also attended Princeton University, earning his PhD degree in physics in 1955.

Romer served as a professor in the department of physics at Amherst College from 1955 to 2001. During his years as a professor, from 1988 to 2001, he served as editor of the American Journal of Physics, and in 1991, he was named a fellow of the American Physical Society, "for his innovative energy-based physics textbook and other writings on the energy problem, and for his editorial work for the entire physics community".

== Personal life and death ==
Romer was married twice. In 1953, he married Diana Hayes. Their marriage lasted until her death in 1992. After the death of his first wife, he then married Betty Steele in 1994. His second marriage lasted until his death in 2025.

Romer died at his home in Amherst, Massachusetts on November 2, 2025, at the age of 94.
