= Tony Hunt (academic) =

Tony Hunt (1944 - November 2025) was a medievalist who specialized in Anglo-Norman and Medieval French studies. He was noted for his prolific and wide-ranging publications, especially editions of medieval texts.

== Books ==
- Plant Names of Medieval England, D. S. Brewer, 1989
- The Medieval Surgery, Boydell and Brewer, 1992
- Teaching and Learning Latin in 13th-century England, Brewer, 1993
