= Anka Ptaszkowska =

Polish art critic and art historian (1935–2025)

- Born: Hanna Ptaszkowska; 17 December 1935; Warsaw, Poland
- Died: 6 November 2025 (aged 89)
- Education: University of Warsaw; Catholic University of Lublin
- Occupations: Art critic and historian

Hanna "Anka" Ptaszkowska (17 December 1935 – 6 November 2025) was a Polish art critic and art historian.

Ptaszkowska co-founded the Foksal Gallery in Warsaw in 1965 before moving to Paris in 1970 with her husband, Eustachy Kossakowski. There, she and her husband, along with Daniel Buren, released the photography collection 6 mètres avant Paris. In 2022, she held an exhibition titled Anka au cas au par cas at the CAPC musée d'art contemporain de Bordeaux.

Ptaszkowska died on 6 November 2025, at the age of 89.
