= Gerti Möller =

German singer (1930–2025)

Gerti Möller (30 October 1930 – 19 November 2025) was a German singer.

== Life and career ==
Gerti Möller collaborated on numerous radio productions, as well as singles and LPs with the Gerd Michaelis Choir and the Horst Krüger Band. With the band Münchehofe, Möller can be heard on the LPs Circulus by Holger Biege, Sag ihr auch by Gerd Christian, and Frank International by Frank Schöbel. Her major solo successes include the songs "Sand im Schuh" (Sand in My Shoe), "Als die Sonne kam" (When the Sun Came), "Herzen haben keine Fenster" (Hearts Have No Windows), "Fahre weiter" (Keep Driving), "Solo im Zigarettenrauch" (Solo in Cigarette Smoke), and "Einsamkeit" (Loneliness). She contributed to the soundtrack of the television series Das unsichtbare Visier (The Invisible Visor). She sang the title song for the DFF miniseries Drei reizende Schwestern (Three Charming Sisters), composed by Gerhard Siebholz. She also contributed to the CD Swingin' Ballads by Uschi Brüning, released in 2005.

On 13 June 2009, her song "Mein Taxi wartet schon" (My Taxi Is Already Waiting) premiered at the Berlin State Opera (Opera Palace) on Unter den Linden. In the same year, she produced the song "Komm kleine Sarah" (Come Little Sarah), and in 2010 she recorded Gerhard Schöne's song "Schmuddeltine." Shortly after her 80th birthday, she presented a new recording of "Hüte den Tag" (Hold the Day) on the MDR program "Hier ab vier" (Here from Four), which was intended for her anniversary album planned for 2011. In collaboration with Heinz-Jürgen Gottschalk, the music project GENERATION plus was created at the beginning of 2011, and on 1 April 2011, she released the song "Sie brauchen Deine Hilfe (in Haiti)" (They Need Your Help (in Haiti)). The production "Ich wünsche Dir Zeit" (I Wish You Time) was released to mark her 65th stage anniversary in 2011.

Möller died on 19 November 2025, at the age of 95.
