= Jean-Jacques Chardeau =

French singer-songwriter (1957–2025)

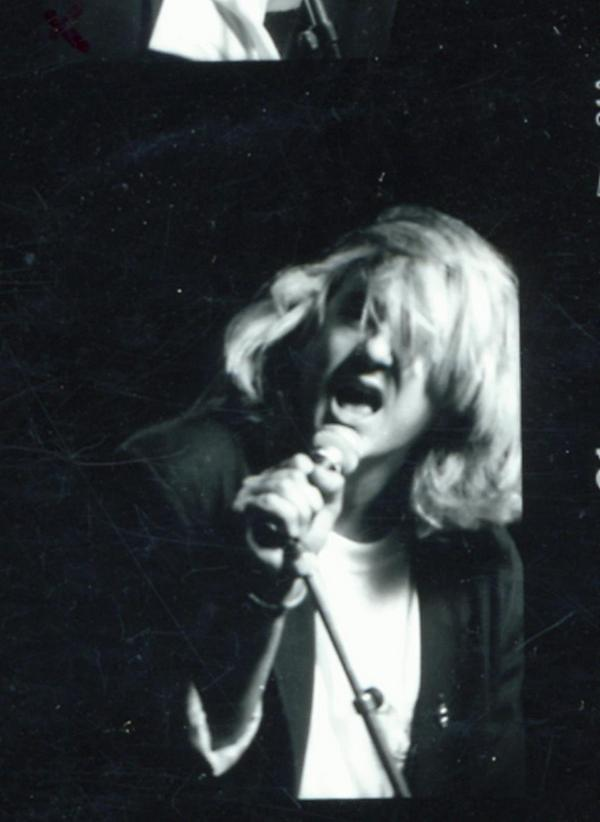
- Chardeau in 1993
- Born: 1957
- Died: 5 November 2025 (aged 68)
- Occupations: Singer-songwriter, Composer
- Style: Progressive Rock, Jazz Rock, French Chanson
- Website: wwww.chardeau.com

Jean-Jacques Chardeau (French: [ʒɑ̃ʒak ʃaʁdo]; 1957 – 5 November 2025) was a French singer-songwriter.

His first album, Chardo's Airlines : Escales, received significant airtime on M6. He reached the pinnacle of his fame in the 1990s with tours across France and Quebec and albums such as Data Pulsions and Hors Portée. His 2010 album Résilience was recorded in the United States alongside Brian Auger, Robert Lamm, Jerry Goodman, and Chris Pinnick.

Chardeau died on 5 November 2025, at the age of 68.

== Discography ==
- Escales (1989)
- Hors Portée (2005)
- Résilience (2010)
- For Sync. (2012)
- Fauves & Pastels (2014)
- Sanguines (2017)
- In Terra Cognita? (2019)
- Ombres & Lumieres : In Terra Cognita 2 (2023)
