= Ernest Nycollin =

French politician (1937–2025)

President of the General Council of Haute-Savoie
- In office 1998–2008
- Preceded by: Bernard Pellarin
- Succeeded by: Christian Monteil

Member of the Regional Council of Rhône-Alpes
- In office 1992–1998

Member of the General Council of Haute-Savoie for the Canton of Taninges
- In office 1973–2008
- Preceded by: Roger Brand
- Succeeded by: Guy Chavanne

Mayor of Taninges
- In office 1977–1986
- Preceded by: Roger Brand
- Succeeded by: Yves Laurat

Personal details
- Born: 2 September 1937 Groisy, France
- Died: 7 November 2025 (aged 88)
- Party: UDF; PR; MR
- Occupation: Banker

Ernest Nycollin (French: [ɛʁnɛst nikɔlɛ̃]; 2 September 1937 – 7 November 2025) was a French politician of the Union for French Democracy (UDF), the Radical Party (PR), and the Radical Movement (MR).

== Life and career ==
Nycollin was mayor of Taninges from 1977 to 1986 and served the Canton of Taninges in the General Council of Haute-Savoie from 1973 to 2008, serving as president of that chamber from 1998 to 2008. He was as a member of the Regional Council of Rhône-Alpes from 1992 to 1998. In 2004, he unsuccessfully ran for a seat in the Senate.

Nycollin died on 7 November 2025, at the age of 88.

== Distinctions ==
- Knight of the Legion of Honour (2003)
