= Eduard Esterleyn =

Russian politician (1935–2025)

- Эдуард Эстерлейн
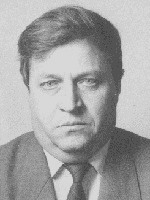

Member of the Federation Council of Russia for the Sakha Republic
- In office January 1994 – January 1996

Personal details
- Born: Eduard Yakovlevich Esterleyn; 28 July 1935 Norka, Volga German ASSR, Russian SFSR, USSR
- Died: 10 November 2025 (aged 90)
- Education: Karaganda Polytechnic Institute; Almaty Institute of National Economy; Academy of National Economy under the USSR Council of Ministers
- Occupation: Engineer

Eduard Yakovlevich Esterleyn (Russian: Эдуард Яковлевич Эстерлейн; 28 July 1935 – 10 November 2025) was a Russian politician. He served in the Federation Council from 1994 to 1996.

Esterleyn died on 10 November 2025, at the age of 90.
