= Barbara Raetsch =

German painter (1936–2025)

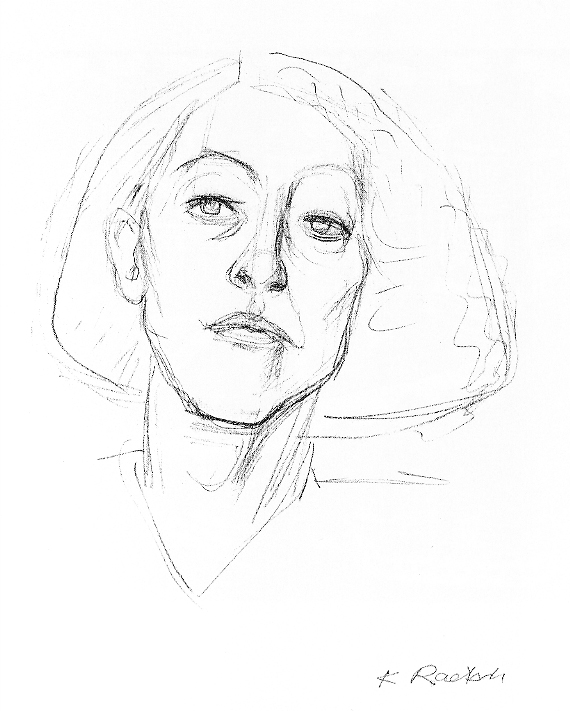
- Portrait of Raetsch (1995)
- Born: 21 October 1936; Pirna, Gau Saxony, German Reich
- Died: 10 November 2025 (aged 89)
- Occupation: Painter

Barbara Raetsch (21 October 1936 – 10 November 2025) was a German painter.

After finishing secondary school, she worked as a horticultural assistant before settling in Potsdam with her husband, Karl. She was a member of the Verband Bildender Künstler der DDR from 1977 to 1990 and used her converted cemetery and chapel in Potsdam as a studio and apartment until 2013. In 2021, she received the Honorary Prize of the Minister-President of the State of Brandenburg, Dietmar Woidke. Throughout her life, she was known as one of Potsdam's most influential artists.

Raetsch died on 10 November 2025, at the age of 89.
