= Hal Mauthe =

American football halfback

Profile
- Position: Halfback

Personal information
- Born: c. 1929
- Died: November 1, 2025 (aged 95)
- Listed height: 5 ft 7 in (1.70 m)
- Listed weight: 160 lb (73 kg)

Career history
- 1951–1952: Winnipeg Blue Bombers

Harold Mauthe (c. 1929 – November 1, 2025) was a Canadian football player who played for the Winnipeg Blue Bombers. He previously played for the Winnipeg Light Infantry. Mauthe died at the age of 95 in 2025.
