= Alice Kitchen =

Activist and social worker

- Born: August 23, 1942
- Died: November 14, 2025 (age 83)

Alice Kitchen was an activist and social worker from Kansas City, Missouri. She was the co-founder of Amethyst Place.

== Life ==
Kitchen grew up in the Brookside neighborhood of Kansas City, Missouri. She attended Immaculate Heart College and earned a master's in social work from UCLA. Kitchen spent nine years as a postulant and novice with the Sisters of Social Service.

Kitchen returned to Kansas City and worked and served as director of social services at Children's Mercy Hospital for twenty years. She worked with many organizations across the Kansas City metro area and sat on several boards and committees serving marginalized communities. In May 1st of 2001, Kitchen, alongside other community members, established the Amethyst Place, a recovery home for women to live with their children in Kansas City, Missouri.

On March 21st of 2012, Kitchen received the Champion of Change Award from the White House in recognition of her work, honored by President Barack Obama for her leadership in educating the community about the Affordable Care Act, serving as a volunteer co-chair for the ACA Public Education Committee. The same year, she retired from Children's Mercy Hospital.
