= Gerhard Krempel =

German politician (1931–2025)

Member of the Landtag of Rhineland-Palatinate
- In office 18 May 1967 – 17 May 1983

Personal details
- Born: 4 February 1931 Westerburg, Hesse-Nassau, Prussia, Germany
- Died: 7 November 2025 (aged 94)
- Political party: CDU
- Education: University of Mainz
- Occupation: Lawyer

Gerhard Krempel (4 February 1931 – 7 November 2025) was a German politician. A member of the Christian Democratic Union, he served in the Landtag of Rhineland-Palatinate from 1967 to 1983.

Krempel died on 7 November 2025, at the age of 94.
