= Levent Erdoğan =

Turkish weightlifter

Personal information
- Nationality: Turkish
- Born: 26 November 1958
- Died: 18 November 2025 (aged 66)

Sport
- Sport: Weightlifting

Levent Erdoğan (26 November 1958 – 18 November 2025) was a Turkish weightlifter. He competed at the 1984 Summer Olympics and the 1988 Summer Olympics.
