= Jonas Hallberg =

Swedish journalist and presenter (1944–2025)

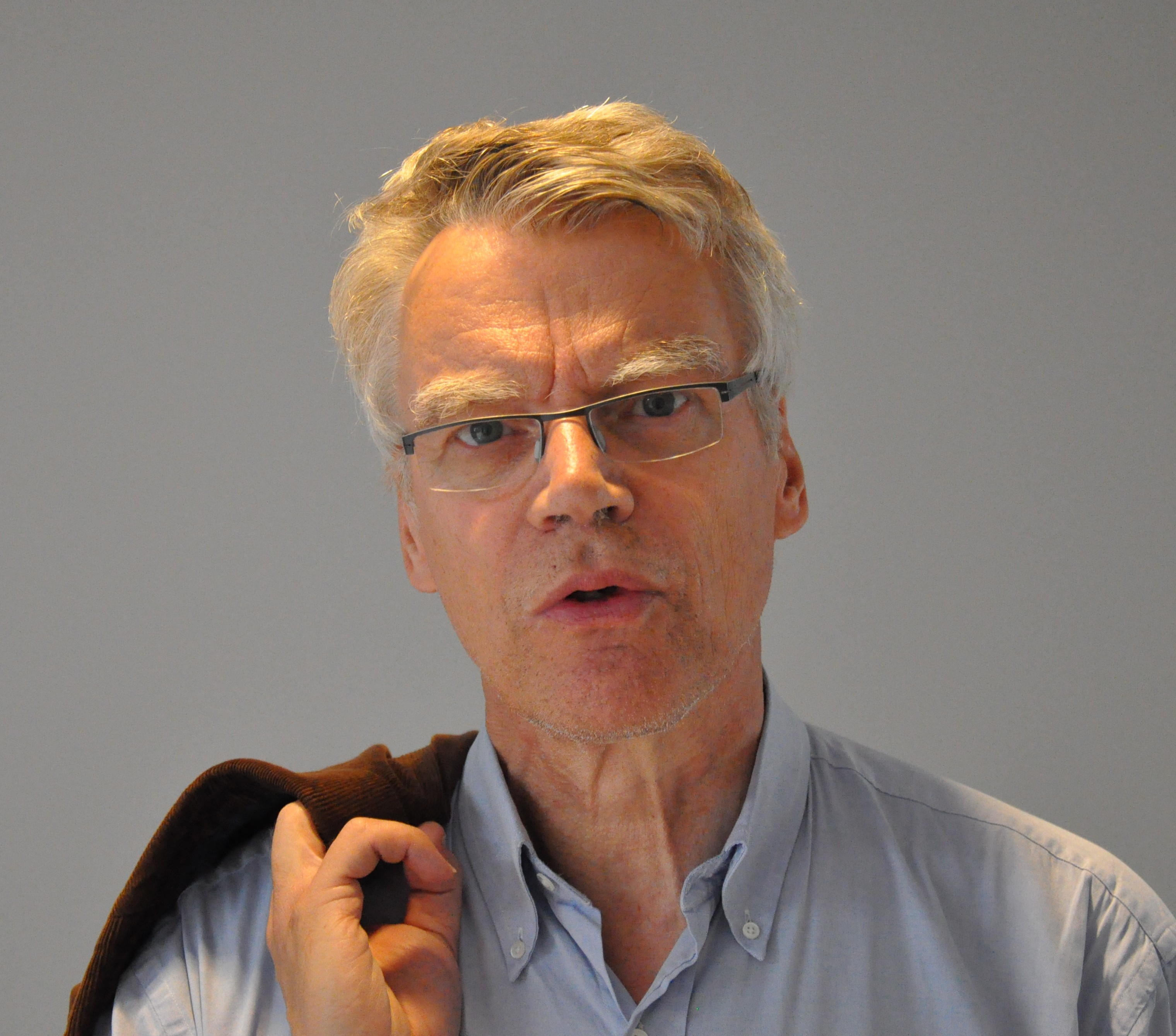
- Hallberg in 2011
- Born: 7 December 1944; Stockholm, Sweden
- Died: 21 November 2025 (aged 80)
- Occupation: Television presenter

Jonas Sven Hallberg (7 December 1944 – 21 November 2025) was a Swedish journalist, radio and television personality, and presenter. He participated in Spanarna in Sveriges Radio and presented Måndagsbörsen and Dominans on SVT. He also worked as a stand-up comedian. In his youth, he was friends with Jan Guillou, and Hallberg described their friendship as Guillou being his first best friend.

In early 2010, Hallberg's first book Vad är sanning och 100 andra jätteviktiga frågor was released through the publishers Lagenskiöld.

Hallberg died on 21 November 2025, at the age of 80.
