= Park Sang-gyu =

South Korean politician (1936–2025)

- 박상규

Member of the National Assembly of South Korea
- In office 30 May 1996 – 29 May 2004

Personal details
- Born: 4 November 1936 Chungju, Korea, Empire of Japan
- Died: 24 November 2025 (aged 89)
- Political party: NCNP; MDP
- Education: Dongguk University (BA)
- Occupation: Schoolteacher

Park Sang-gyu (Korean: 박상규; 4 November 1936 – 24 November 2025) was a South Korean politician. A member of the National Congress for New Politics and the Millennium Democratic Party, he served in the National Assembly from 1996 to 2004.

Park died on 24 November 2025, at the age of 89.
