= Anna Díaz Morello =

Spanish Aranese politician (died 2025)

Anna Díaz Morello (died 11 November 2025) was a Spanish Aranese politician and tourism professional. She served as an elected member of the Conselh Generau d'Aran, the legislative body of the Aran Valley, an autonomous entity in Catalonia, from 2011 to 2019. Díaz was a major proponent of the tourism industry in the Aran Valley and served as Minister of Tourism in the Conselh Generau d'Aran. In April 2015, Tourism Minister Díaz Morello, on behalf of the Torisme Val d'Aran, accepted an award from the National Geographic Society recognizing the Aran Valley as one of the world's top three top leadership destinations at the ITB Berlin.

Anna Díaz Morello died on 11 November 2025.
