= Madiassa Maguiraga =

Malian academic and politician (1943–2025)

Personal details
- Born: 10 February 1943 Nioro du Sahel, French Sudan, French West Africa
- Died: 5 November 2025 (aged 82)
- Political party: PPP
- Occupation: Academic

Madiassa Maguiraga (10 February 1943 – 5 November 2025) was a Malian academic and politician of the Popular Party for Progress (PPP).

After studying electric engineering in the United States, he taught at Kwame Nkrumah University of Science and Technology, Tuskegee University, and the University of Kinshasa. He was also notably the first African to work for NASA.

In the 2007 presidential election, he ran under the PPP banner, advocating for higher salaries, job creation, and better management of natural resources. He won only 0.30% of the vote, the last out of eight candidates, in a race that was won by incumbent President Amadou Toumani Touré.

Maguiraga died on 5 November 2025, at the age of 82.
