= Brian Mackney =

Canadian professional wrestler (1948–2025)

Personal information
- Born: 12 September 1948 Hamilton, Ontario, Canada
- Died: 3 November 2025 (aged 77)

Professional wrestling career
- Ring name(s): Brian Mackney; Silent Mackney; Masked X Asian Killer
- Billed height: 5 ft 10.5 in (179 cm)
- Billed weight: 251 lb (114 kg)
- Trained by: Johnny Evans; Fred Atkins
- Debut: 1972
- Retired: 1998

Brian Mackney (12 September 1948 – 3 November 2025) was a Canadian professional wrestler who spent his career in Toronto, the World Wrestling Federation and Japan during the 1970s and 1980s.

== Professional wrestling career ==
Mackney worked mainly in Toronto and other Canadian promotions.

He worked for New Japan Pro-Wrestling from 1978 to 1979 and All Japan Pro Wrestling in 1981.

From 1984 to 1986, he worked for the World Wrestling Federation when events were only in Toronto and Southern Ontario.

== Personal life and death ==
Mackney was the first deaf wrestler to even be employed by the WWE. He was awarded a lifetime achievement award by Great White North Wrestling in 2019.

Mackney died on November 3, 2025, at the age of 77.
