= László Ábrahám =

Hungarian lawyer (1943–2025)

- Born: 22 June 1943; Szeged, Hungary
- Died: 24 November 2025 (aged 82)
- Occupation: Lawyer

László Ábrahám (22 June 1943 – 24 November 2025) was a Hungarian lawyer. He was a recipient of the Hungarian Golden Cross of Merit (2020).

Ábrahám died on 24 November 2025, at the age of 82.
