= 2025 deaths in the United States (October–December) =

- Decades: 2000s; 2010s; 2020s; 2030s
- See also: History of the United States (2016–present); Timeline of United States history (2010–present); List of years in the United States

The following notable deaths in the United States occurred in July–September 2025. Names are reported under the date of death, in alphabetical order as set out in WP:NAMESORT. A typical entry reports information in the following sequence: Name, age, country of citizenship at birth and subsequent nationality (if applicable), what subject was noted for, year of birth (if known), and reference.

== October ==
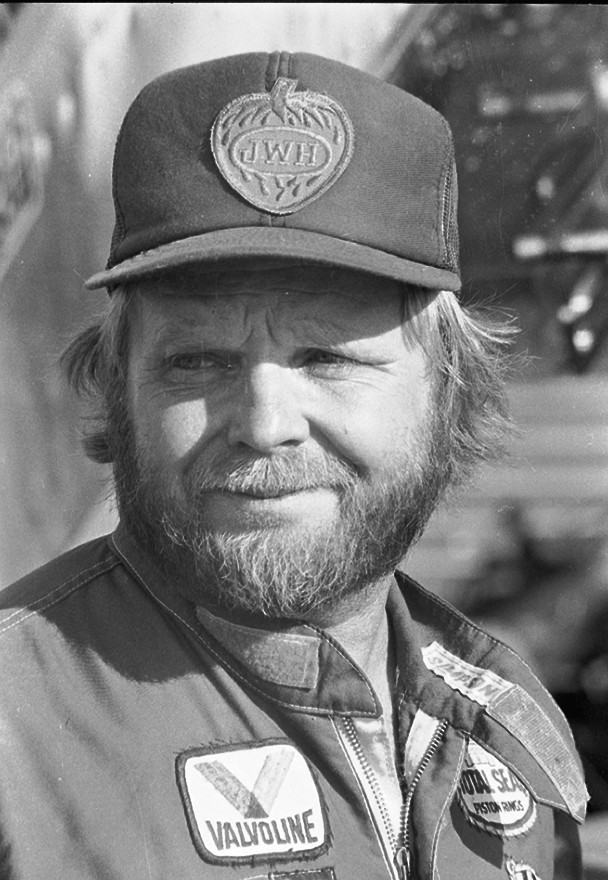
Bobby Allen

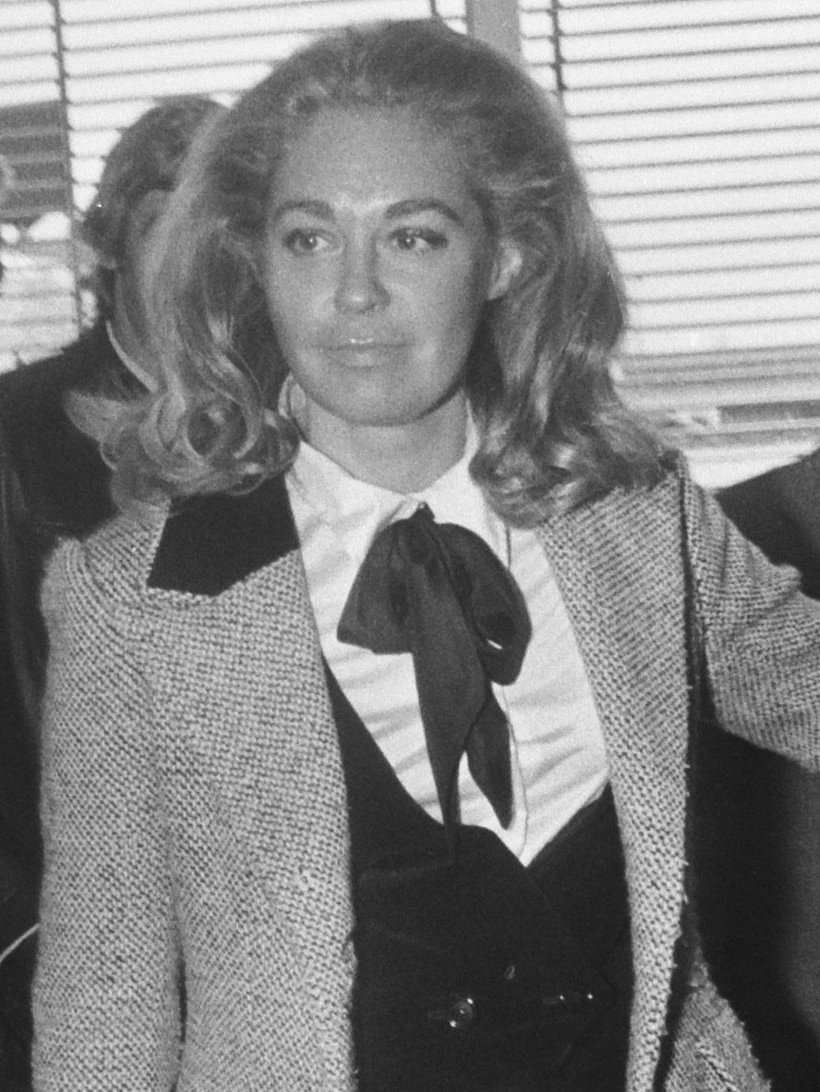
Joan Bennett Kennedy

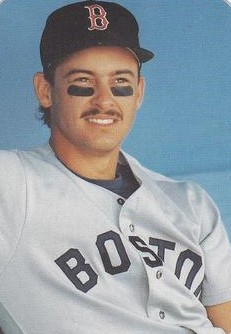
Mike Greenwell

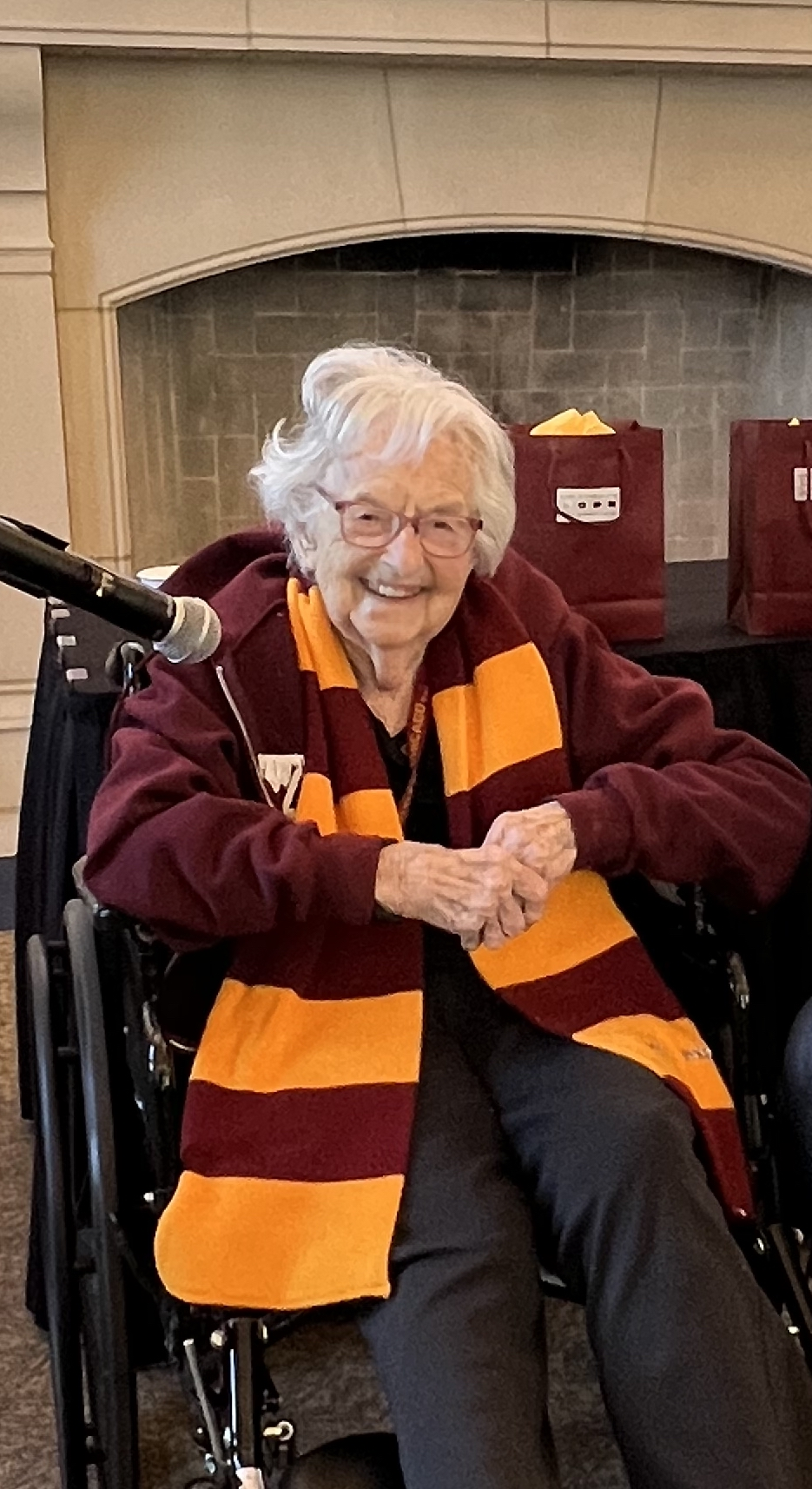
Sister Jean

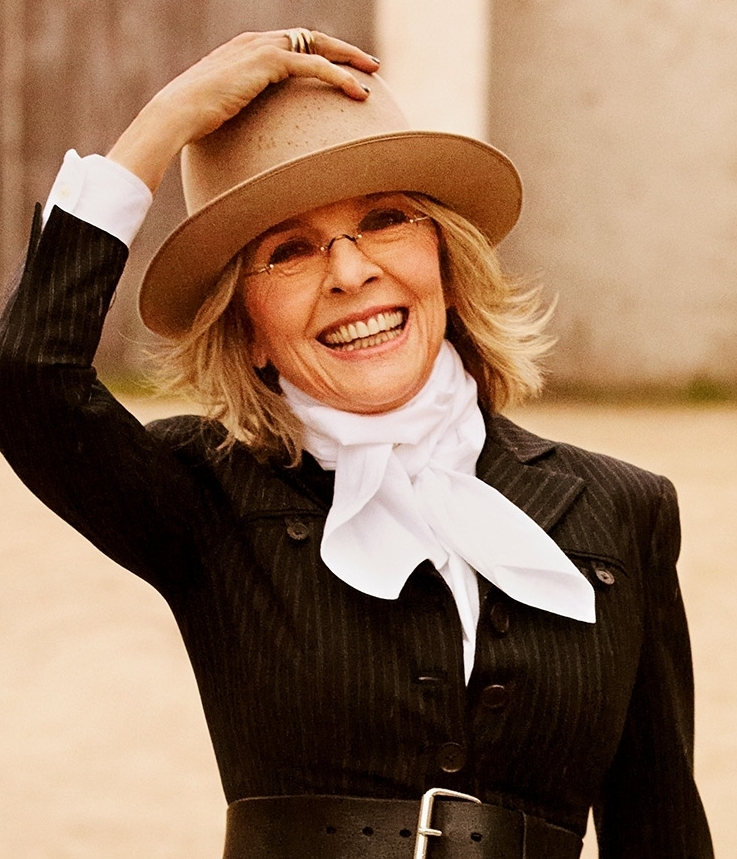
Diane Keaton

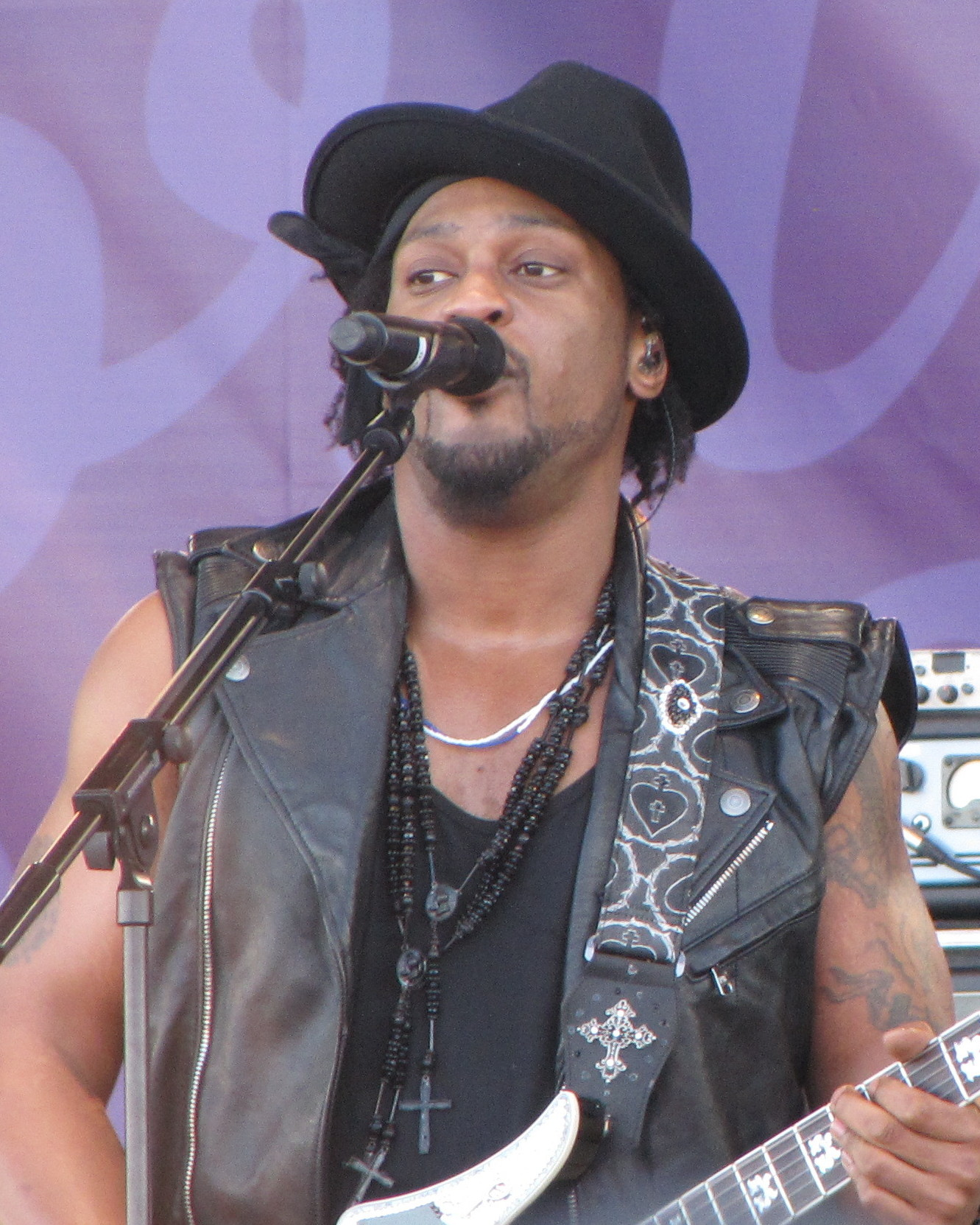
D'Angelo

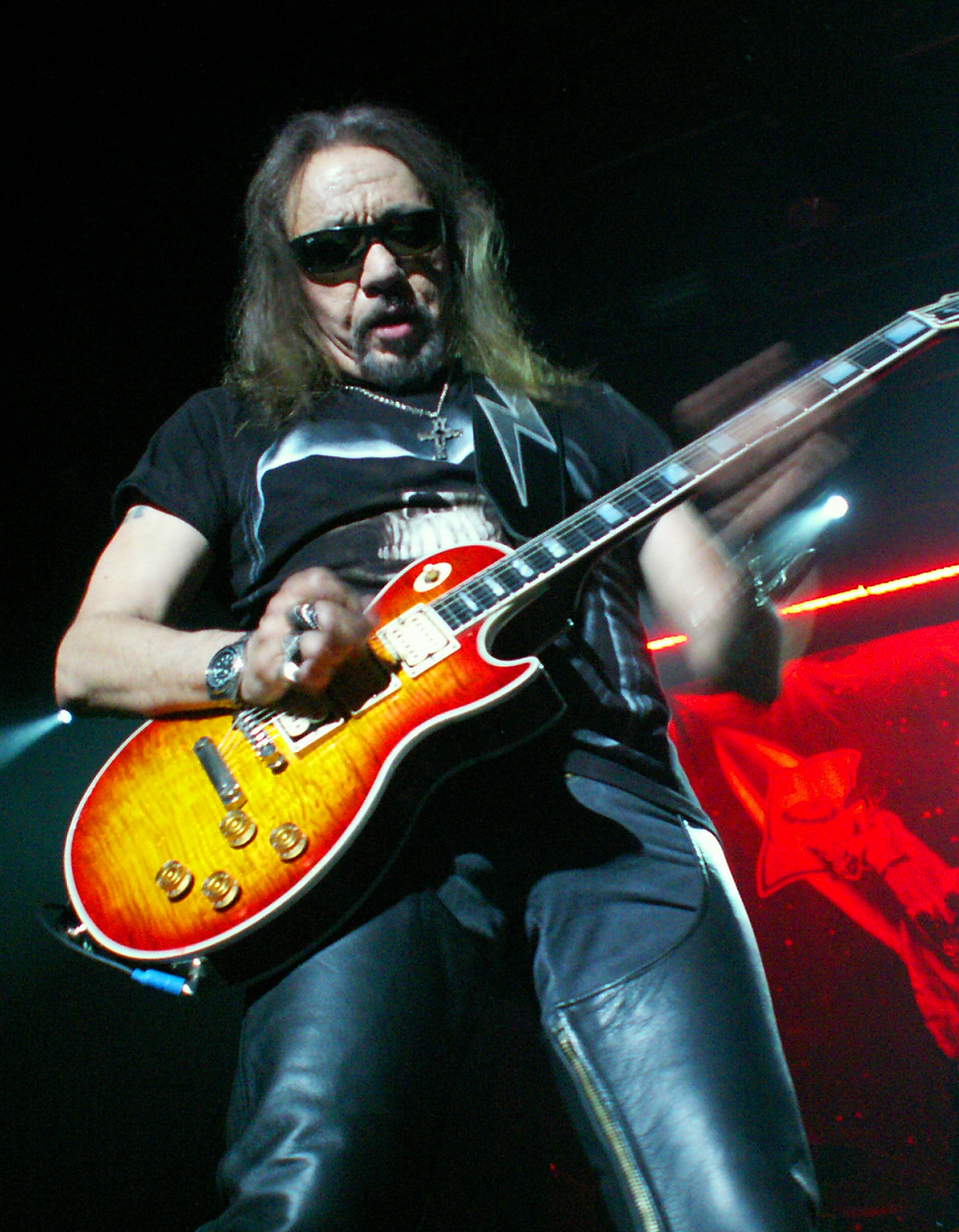
Ace Frehley

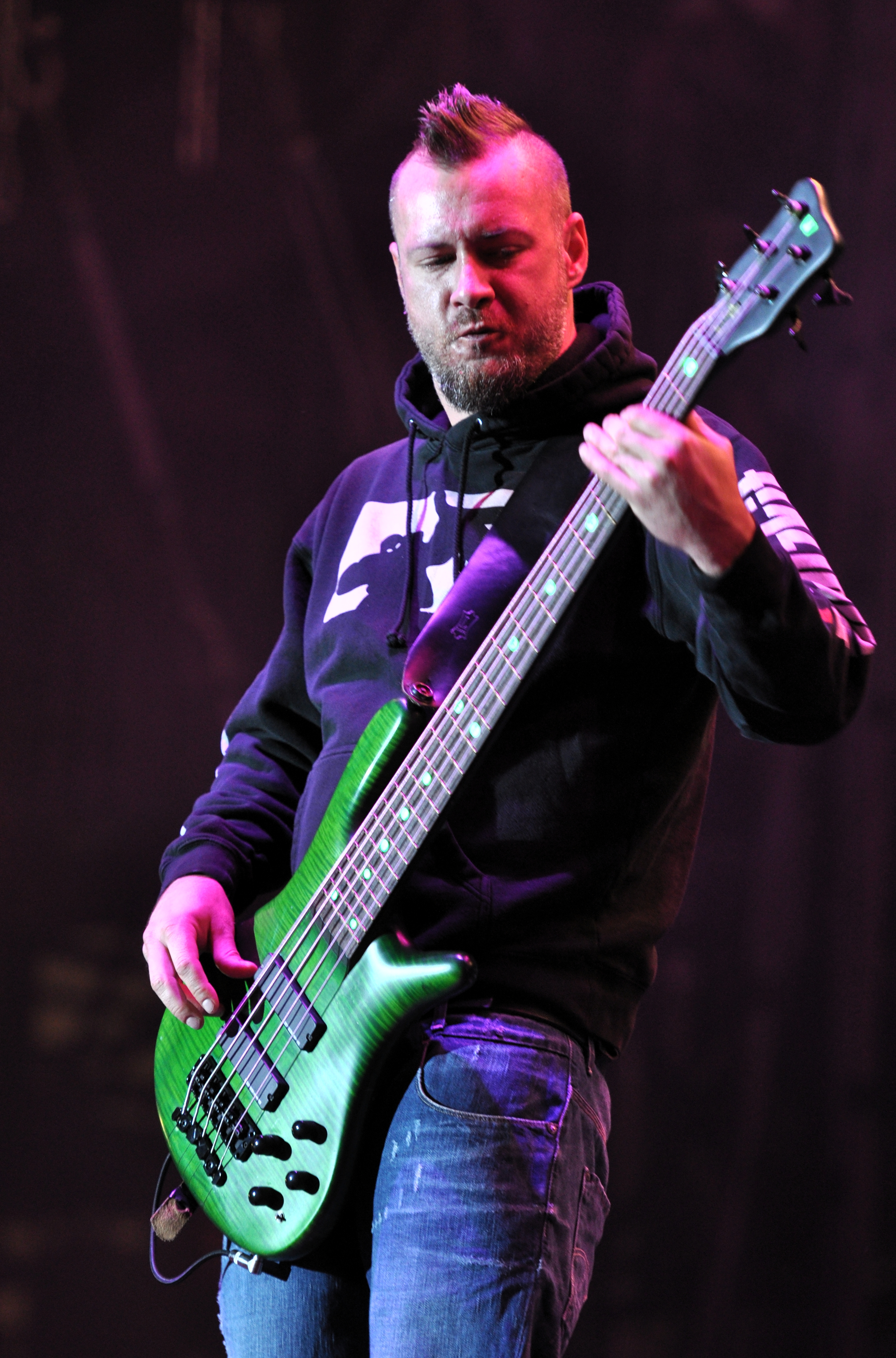
Sam Rivers

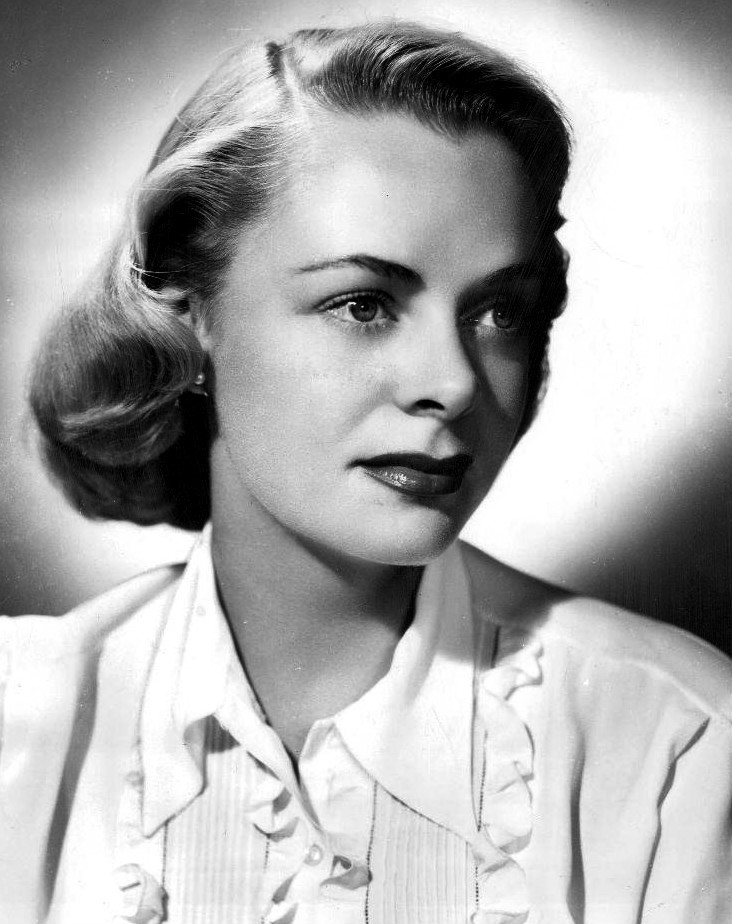
June Lockhart

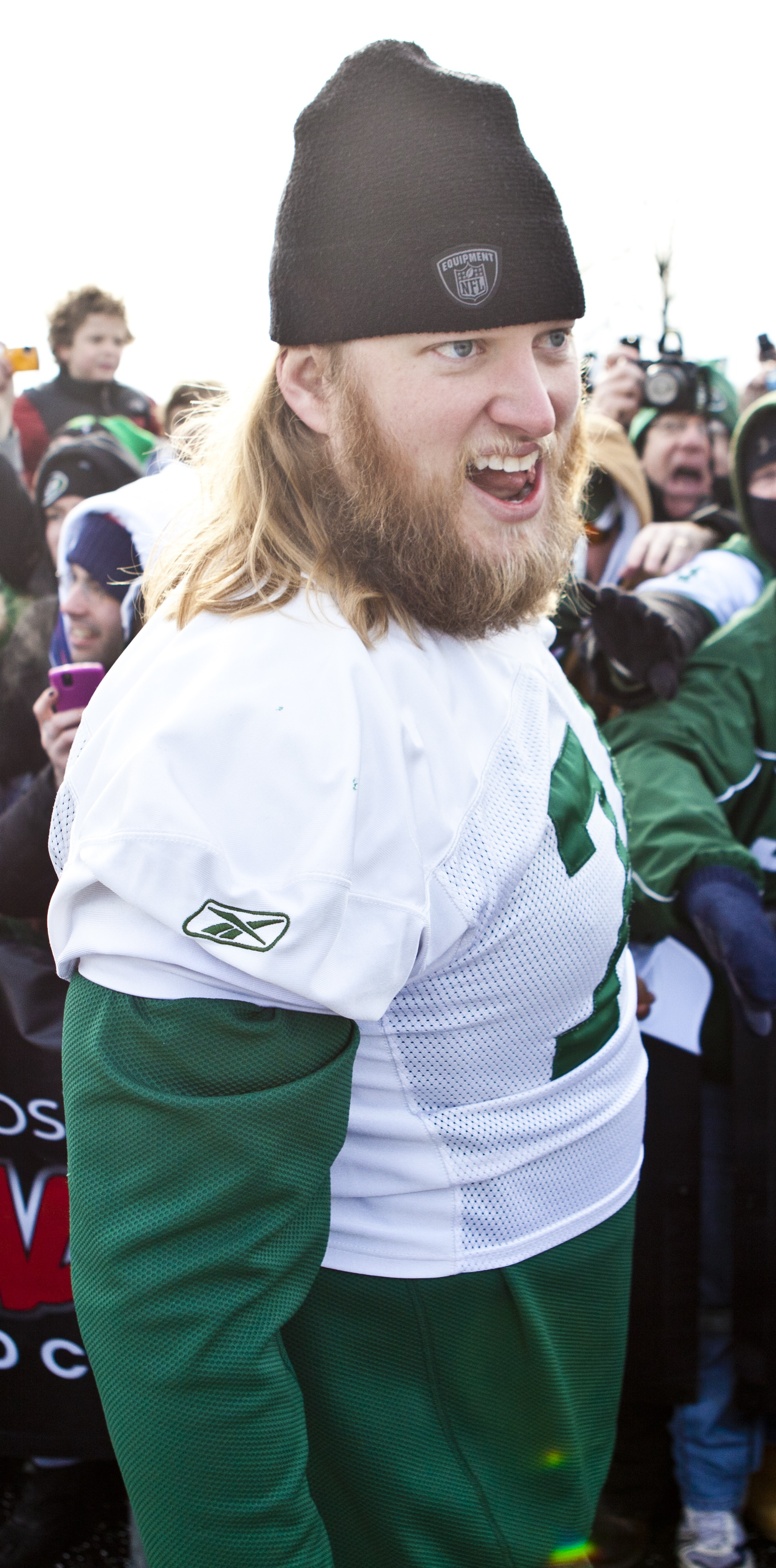
Nick Mangold

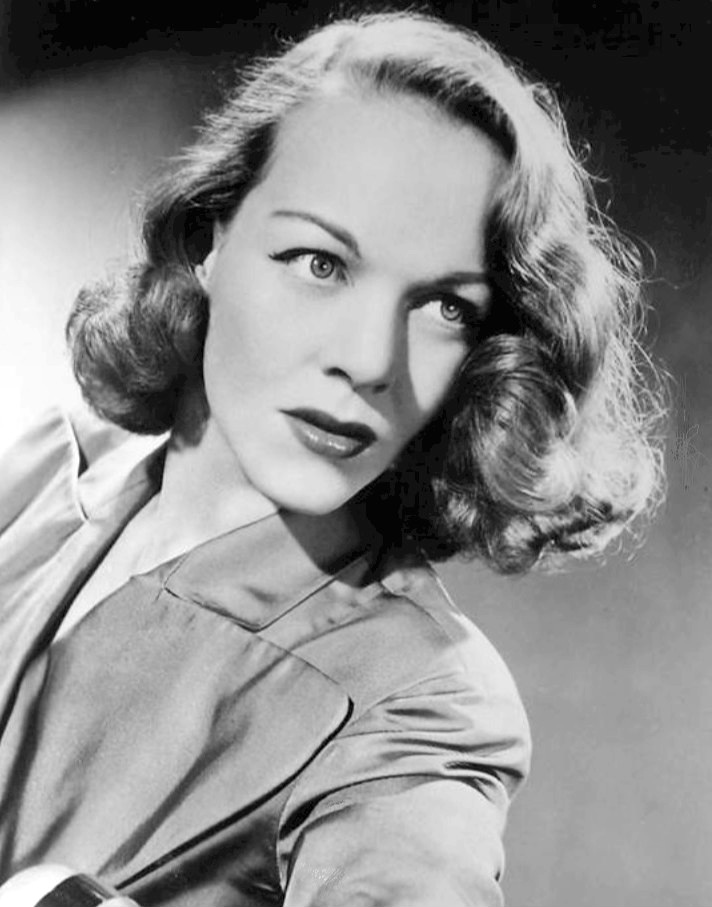
Maria Riva

- October 1
  - Lin Arison, 88, writer and art patron, co-founder of YoungArts (b. 1937)
  - Edward J. Kennedy, 74, politician, mayor of Lowell (2016–2018) and member of the Massachusetts Senate (since 2019) (b. 1951)
  - Jerry Leggio, 90, actor (Blaze, The Badge, American Violet) (b. 1935)
  - Balin Miller, 23, mountaineer (b. 2002)
  - Don Monson, 92, college basketball coach (Idaho Vandals, Oregon Ducks) (b. 1933)
  - Christopher Sharpless, 80, Olympic bobsledder (1988) (b. 1945)
  - William Timmons, 94, political lobbyist (b. 1930)
- October 2
  - Mindy Carson, 98, traditional pop singer (b. 1927)
  - Richard Pew, 92, psychologist and Olympic fencer (1956) (b. 1933)
  - Ed Williams, 98, actor (Police Squad!, The Naked Gun, Father of the Bride) (b. 1926)
  - Justin Woodward, 43, chef (b. 1982)
- October 3
  - Milton Esterow, 97, art journalist (The New York Times, ARTnews) (b. 1928)
  - Kimberly Hébert Gregory, 52, actress (Vice Principals, Kevin (Probably) Saves the World, Craig of the Creek) (b. 1972)
  - Arthur Jones, 39, football player (Baltimore Ravens, Indianapolis Colts, Washington Redskins), Super Bowl champion (2013) (b. 1986)
  - Richard A. Weinberg, 82, developmental psychologist (b. 1943)
- October 4
  - Ralph DesLauriers, 90, businessman, cofounder of Bolton Valley Resort (b. 1935)
  - Milan Mandarić, 87, Serbian-born computer industry and football executive, founder of Sanmina Corporation, chairman of Portsmouth (1999–2006) and Leicester City (2006–2009) (b. 1938)
  - BeBe Shopp, 95, beauty pageant titleholder, Miss America (1948) (b. 1930)
- October 5
  - Bobby Allen, 81, racecar driver (b. 1943)
  - Ron Dean, 87, actor (The Breakfast Club, Risky Business, The Fugitive) (b. 1938)
  - Marjorie Hughes, 99, pop singer (b. 1925)
  - Ken Jacobs, 92, filmmaker (Tom, Tom, the Piper's Son, Star Spangled to Death, Blonde Cobra) (b. 1933)
  - Ken Parker, 73, luthier (Parker Fly), founder of Parker Guitars (b. 1952)
  - Daryl Sanders, 84, football player (Detroit Lions) (b. 1941)
  - Jerry Tokofsky, 91, film producer (Where's Poppa?, Dreamscape, Glengarry Glen Ross) (b. 1934)
  - Ann B. Walker, 101, journalist, editor and radio personality (b. 1923)
- October 6
  - G. Michael Brown, 82, attorney and casino regulator (b. 1942)
  - Claire Celsi, 59, politician, member of the Iowa Senate (since 2019) (b. 1966)
  - Bruce Cutler, 77, criminal defense lawyer (John Gotti) (b. 1948)
  - Richard G. Luthy, 80, environmental engineer (b. 1945)
  - Eugene Rotberg, 95, investment banker (World Bank Group) (b. 1930)
- October 7
  - Glenn Allison, 95, ten-pin bowler (b. 1930)
  - Paul Deem, 68, Olympic cyclist (1976) (b. 1957)
  - Ian Freebairn-Smith, 93, film and television composer (b. 1932)
  - Carolyn Cheeks Kilpatrick, 80, politician, member of the U.S. House of Representatives (1997–2011) (b. 1945)
  - Don Koivisto, 76, politician, member of the Michigan House of Representatives (1981–1986) and Senate (1990–2002) (b. 1949)
  - Gilles Larrain, 86, photographer (b. 1938)
  - Chris Ponnet, 68, Roman Catholic priest (b. 1957)
  - Rick Shaw, 78, football player (Calgary Stampeders, Winnipeg Blue Bombers) (b. 1946)
  - Katie True, 84, politician, member of the Pennsylvania House of Representatives (1993–2000, 2003–2010) (b. 1941)
  - Baron Wormser, 77, poet (b. 1948)
  - Saul Zabar, 97, businessman (b. 1928)
- October 8
  - Terry "Buzzy" Johnson, 86, Hall of Fame singer (The Flamingos), songwriter ("Baby, Baby Don't Cry", "Here I Go Again") and music producer (b. 1938)
  - Joan Bennett Kennedy, 89, socialite (b. 1936)
  - Nolan R. Williams, 43, neurophysicist (b. 1982)
  - Oscar Wyatt, 101, oil industry executive, founder of Coastal Corporation (b. 1924)
- October 9
  - Ernestine Bazemore, 66, politician, member of the North Carolina Senate (2021–2022) (b. 1959)
  - Tad R. Callister, 79, Mormon leader (b. 1945)
  - Mike Greenwell, 62, Hall of Fame baseball player (Boston Red Sox) (b. 1963)
  - Martha Scanlan Klima, 86, politician, member of the Maryland House of Delegates (1983–2003) (b. 1938)
  - Hoa Nguyen, 41, politician, member of the Oregon House of Representatives (since 2023) (b. 1983)
  - Billy Koen, 87, nuclear engineer (b. 1938)
  - Jean Dolores Schmidt, 106, religious sister (Sisters of Charity of the Blessed Virgin Mary) and chaplain (Loyola Ramblers) (b. 1919)
  - Arlo Smith, 98, lawyer, district attorney of San Francisco (1980–1996) (b. 1927)
  - Julie Suk, 101, poet (b. 1924)
  - Frank Wimberley, 99, artist (b. 1926)
- October 10
  - Ted Hartley, 100, actor (Ice Station Zebra, Barefoot in the Park, High Plains Drifter) and producer (b. 1924)
  - Heather Hill, 85, television director (The Young and the Restless) (b. 1940)
  - Thommy Price, 68, rock drummer (Scandal, Love Crushed Velvet, Joan Jett and the Blackhearts) (b. 1956) (death announced on this date)
  - Charlie Schmaus, 81, college basketball coach (VMI Keydets) (b. 1944)
  - Alex Wallau, 80, boxing announcer (b. 1945)
- October 11
  - David J. Armor, 86, social scientist, academic and author (b. 1938)
  - Tony Fitzpatrick, 66, mixed media collage artist, poet and actor (Philadelphia, Primal Fear, U.S. Marshals) (b. 1958)
  - Grubby, 3, opossum (b. 2022)
  - Earl C. Haag, 96, scholar and linguist (b. 1929)
  - Tom Hansen, 78, politician, member of the Nebraska Legislature (2007–2015) (b. 1946)
  - Artie Kaplan, 89, musician and composer (b. 1935)
  - Diane Keaton, 79, actress (Annie Hall, The Godfather, Something's Gotta Give), Oscar winner (1978) (b. 1946) (death announced on this date)
- October 12
  - Mandi Ballinger, 50, politician, member of the Georgia House of Representatives (since 2013) (b. 1975)
  - Jackie Burch, 74, casting director (Die Hard, The Breakfast Club, Predator) (b. 1951)
  - Robert P. Lattimer, 80, chemist (Lubrizol) (b. 1945)
  - Doug Lebda, 55, businessman, founder and CEO of LendingTree (b. 1970)
  - Gurney Norman, 88, writer, documentarian and academic (b. 1937)
  - Thomas Rew, 103, air force major general (b. 1922)
  - Janet Smith, 59, long-distance runner, cross country senior world champion (1987) (b. 1965)
- October 13
  - Sandy Alomar Sr., 81, Puerto Rican baseball player (Atlanta Braves, California Angels, New York Yankees) (b. 1943)
  - Stephen R. Anderson, 82, linguist, esophageal cancer (b. 1943)
  - Richard P. Cueroni, 95, Coast Guard admiral (b. 1930)
  - Marty Domres, 78, football player (San Diego Chargers, Baltimore Colts, New York Jets) (b. 1947)
  - Myron Lapka, 69, football player (New York Giants, Los Angeles Rams, Green Bay Packers) (b. 1956)
  - Miss Major Griffin-Gracy, 78, activist (b. 1946)
  - John McCrumbly, 72, football player (Buffalo Bills) (b. 1953)
  - Drew Struzan, 78, film poster artist (Star Wars, Indiana Jones, Back to the Future) (b. 1947)
  - Sara Terry, 70, photographer and filmmaker (b. 1955)
- October 14
  - Dick Addrisi, 84, singer (Addrisi Brothers) and songwriter ("Never My Love") (b. 1938)
  - Roberta Alexander, 76, operatic soprano (b. 1949)
  - Lawrence J. Block, 74, jurist, judge of the United States Court of Federal Claims (2002–2016) (b. 1951)
  - Larry Burright, 88, baseball player (Los Angeles Dodgers, New York Mets) (b. 1937)
  - Nancy Chodorow, 81, sociologist and academic (b. 1944)
  - D'Angelo, 51, neo-soul singer-songwriter ("Untitled (How Does It Feel)") (b. 1974)
  - Craig Eaton, 71, baseball player (Kansas City Royals) (b. 1954)
  - Moshe Hauer, 60, rabbi, executive vice president of the Orthodox Union, heart attack (b. 1965)
  - Penelope Milford, 77, actress (Coming Home, Endless Love, Heathers) (b. 1948)
  - Samuel Lee Smithers, 72, convicted murderer (b. 1953)
  - Yuriy Tarnawsky, 91, Ukrainian-born poet (b. 1934)
- October 15
  - Charles Ray Crawford, 59, convicted murderer (b. 1966)
  - Samantha Eggar, 86, English-born actress (The Collector, Doctor Dolittle, The Brood) (b. 1939)
  - Edward Joseph Gilbert, 88, Roman Catholic prelate, bishop of Roseau (1994–2001) and archbishop of Port of Spain (2001–2011) (b. 1936)
  - John Morris, 84, baseball player (Baltimore Orioles, Milwaukee Brewers, San Francisco Giants) (b. 1941)
  - Eric D. Newsom, 82, diplomat, assistant secretary of state for political-military affairs (1998–2000) (b. 1943)
  - Sakineh (Simin) M. Redjali, 91, Iranian-born psychologist and author (b. 1934)
- October 16
  - Bob Franke, 78, singer-songwriter (b. 1947)
  - Ace Frehley, 74, guitarist (Kiss) (b. 1951)
  - Thomas N. George, 87, politician, member of the Massachusetts House of Representatives (1997–2005) (b. 1938)
  - Barbara Gips, 89, copywriter (b. 1936)
  - Morton Kaish, 98, artist (b. 1927)
  - Bette E. Landman, 88, anthropologist and academic administrator, president of Arcadia University (1985–2004) (b. 1937)
  - Duke Roufus, 55, kickboxer, founder of Roufusport (b. 1970)
  - Susan Stamberg, 87, radio host (All Things Considered, Weekend Edition) (b. 1938)
  - Larry Williams, 62, football player (Cleveland Browns) and athletic director (San Francisco Dons) (b. 1963)
- October 17
  - Richard Djerf, 55, convicted mass murderer (b. 1969)
  - Joseph C. Goulden, 91, writer and journalist (b. 1934)
  - Murray Mednick, 86, playwright (b. 1939)
  - Thomas Metzger, 91–92, sinologist and academic (b. 1933)
  - Charles J. Otto, 61, politician, member of the Maryland House of Delegates (since 2011) (b. 1964)
  - Bill Pleis, 88, baseball player (Minnesota Twins) (b. 1937)
  - Duke Roufus, 55, kickboxer and founder of Roufusport (b. 1970)
  - Hal Sirowitz, 76, poet (b. 1949)
  - Phyllis Trible, 92, feminist biblical scholar (b. 1932)
- October 18
  - Paul Boutin, 63, journalist (b. 1961)
  - Janusz Bugajski, 71, political scientist (b. 1954)
  - Gertrude Ehrlich, 102, Austrian-born mathematician (b. 1923)
  - Clinton Harden, 78, politician, member of the New Mexico Senate (2003–2012) (b. 1947)
  - Eileen Harris, 92, American-British architectural historian and author (b. 1932)
  - Doug Martin, 36, football player (Tampa Bay Buccaneers) (b. 1989)
  - Don Perdue, 75, politician, member of the West Virginia House of Delegates (1999–2016) (b. 1949)
  - Sam Rivers, 48, bassist (Limp Bizkit) (b. 1977)
  - Alison Rose, 81, model and writer (The New Yorker) (b. 1944) (death announced on this date)
  - Bernie Smith, 84, baseball player (Milwaukee Brewers) (b. 1941)
  - Henry Sorrell, 82, football player (Denver Broncos, Hamilton Tiger-Cats, BC Lions) (b. 1943)
  - Stephen Starring, 64, football player (New England Patriots) (b. 1961)
  - Margaret Tedesco, 73, curator, visual artist and dancer (b. 1952)
- October 19
  - Dewey Bohling, 87, football player (New York Jets, Buffalo Bills) (b. 1938)
  - Anthony Jackson, 73, bassist (b. 1952)
  - Rob Mallicoat, 60, baseball player (Houston Astros) (b. 1964)
  - Mickey McGuire, 84, baseball player (Baltimore Orioles) (b. 1941)
  - Warren McVea, 79, football player (Cincinnati Bengals, Kansas City Chiefs), Super Bowl champion (1970) (b. 1946)
  - Mo, 58, professional wrestler (WWE) (b. 1967)
  - Bob Mulholland, 78, political strategist (b. 1946)
  - Daniel Naroditsky, 29, chess grandmaster (b. 1995)
  - Gibbons Ruark, 83, poet (b. 1941)
  - Jerry Stalcup, 86, football player (Los Angeles Rams, Denver Broncos) (b. 1938)
  - Ioannis Yannas, 90, Greek-born biomedical engineer (b. 1935)
- October 20
  - Richard Barringer, 87, politician and writer (b. 1937)
  - Robert Bartlett, 86, surgeon (b. 1939)
  - Morris Chapman, 84, Baptist pastor and writer (b. 1940)
  - Robert R. Chase, 77, author (b. 1948)
  - Willis Crenshaw, 84, football player (St. Louis Cardinals, Denver Broncos) (b. 1941)
  - Michael DeLano, 84, actor (Ocean's Eleven, Magnum, P.I., Commando) and singer (b. 1940)
  - Ed Kerns, 80, abstract artist and educator (b. 1945)
  - Bob Reinhart, 87, basketball coach (Georgia State Panthers) (b. 1938)
  - Arthur Waskow, 92, rabbi, author and political activist (b. 1933)
- October 21
  - Michael McKee, 85, tenants rights activist (b. 1939)
- October 22
  - William Carris, 81, politician, member of the Vermont Senate (2007–2012) (b. 1944)
  - Lou Clarizio, 94, baseball player (Chicago American Giants) (b. 1931)
  - Jackie Ferrara, 95, sculptor and draftswoman (b. 1929)
  - David J. Fischer, 92, politician, mayor of St. Petersburg (1991–2001) (b. 1933)
  - Willis Patterson, 94, bass-baritone (b. 1930)
- October 23
  - Carol Hurd Green, 90, scholar and author (b. 1935)
  - Alison Isenberg, 63, historian (b. 1962)
  - June Lockhart, 100, actress (Lost in Space, Lassie, Petticoat Junction) (b. 1925)
  - Steven Moss, 62, author (b. 1962)
  - Kellogg Stelle, 77, American-born British theoretical physicist (b. 1948)
  - Tim Tackett, 84, martial artist (b. 1941)
  - Ellen Bryant Voigt, 82, poet (b. 1943)
- October 24
  - Dave Coskunian, 77, Turkish-born soccer player (Los Angeles Toros, San Jose Earthquakes, United States national team) (b. 1948)
  - Carol Davis, 93, sports team owner, co-owner of the Las Vegas Raiders and Las Vegas Aces (b. 1932)
  - Marcie Free, 71, singer (King Kobra, Unruly Child) (b. 1954) (death announced on this date)
  - John Handegard, 87, Hall of Fame tenpin bowler (b. 1938)
  - Andy Hinson, 95, football player (Bethune–Cookman Wildcats) and coach (Cheyney Wolves) (b. 1930)
  - Kathy Karpan, 83, politician, Secretary of State of Wyoming (1987–1995) (b. 1942)
  - J. William Middendorf, 101, diplomat, secretary of the Navy (1974–1977), ambassador to the Netherlands (1969–1973) and the European Union (1985–1987) (b. 1924)
  - Peace, 51, rapper (Freestyle Fellowship) (b. 1974)
  - Benita Valente, 91, soprano (b. 1934)
- October 25
  - Sharon Camp, 81, entrepreneuse (b. 1943)
  - Christopher Willis Gortner, 60–61, author (b. 1964)
  - John Kowalko, 80, politician, member of the Delaware House of Representatives (2006–2022) (b. 1945)
  - Ann Lee, 96, cannabis activist (b. 1929)
  - Nick Mangold, 41, football player (New York Jets) (b. 1984)
  - John N. Miksic, 78, archaeologist (b. 1946)
  - Hamilton O. Smith, 94, microbiologist, Nobel Prize laureate (1978) (b. 1931)
  - John Sweeny, 76, judge, justice of the New York Supreme Court (1999–2019) (b. 1949)
- October 26
  - Karim Bitar, 60, businessman (b. 1965)
  - Clyde Bradley, 91, politician, member of the Iowa House of Representatives (1995–2003) (b. 1934)
  - J. Alfred Broaddus, 86, banker, president of the Federal Reserve Bank of Richmond (1993–2004) (b. 1939)
  - Jack DeJohnette, 83, jazz drummer (Miles Davis Quintet), pianist and composer, Grammy winner (2009, 2022) (b. 1942)
  - Lorinda de Roulet, 95, philanthropist (b. 1930)
  - Richard H. Stallings, 85, politician, member of the U.S. House of Representatives (1985–1993) (b. 1940)
  - Andrew J. Stofan, 90, engineer (NASA) (b. 1935)
- October 27
  - George Atkinson, 78, football player (Oakland Raiders, Denver Broncos), Super Bowl champion (1977) (b. 1947)
  - Alice Gast, 67, chemical engineer and researcher, pancreatic cancer (b. 1958)
  - Richard P. Guy, 93, jurist, justice of the Washington Supreme Court (1989–2001) (b. 1932)
  - J. D. King, 74, artist and musician (The Coachmen) (b. 1951)
  - Henry Lyons, 83, Protestant pastor, president of the National Baptist Convention (1994–1999) (b. 1942)
  - Al Nagler, 90, optical designer and amateur astronomer (b. 1935)
  - Jerry Taff, 85, anchorman (WISN-TV) (b. 1940)
  - Billy Roy Wilson, 85, jurist, judge of the U.S. District Court for Eastern Arkansas (since 1993) (b. 1939)
- October 28
  - Mike Manley, 83, Olympic steeplechaser (1972) (b. 1942)
  - John Smietanka, 84, attorney, U.S. attorney for the Western District of Michigan (1981–1994) (b. 1941)
- October 29
  - Arline Bronzaft, 89, environmental psychologist (b. 1936)
  - Alvin Kass, 89, rabbi (b. 1935)
  - Alison Knowles, 92, visual artist (Fluxus) (b. 1933)
  - Maria Riva, 100, German-born actress (The Scarlet Empress, The Garden of Allah, Scrooged) (b. 1924)
  - Pierre Robert, 70, disc jockey (WMMR) (b. 1955)
  - Gladys Stone Wright, 100, band director (b. 1925)
- October 30
  - Steve Corbett, 74, football player (New England Patriots) (b. 1951)
  - Steve Hargan, 83, baseball player (Cleveland Indians, Texas Rangers, Atlanta Braves) (b. 1942)
  - Marjorie Johnson, 106, baker (b. 1919)
  - Burt Meyer, 99, toy inventor (Rock 'Em Sock 'Em Robots, Lite-Brite, Mouse Trap) (b. 1926)
  - Scott Sorry, 47, rock musician and songwriter (The Wildhearts, Sorry and the Sinatras, Amen) (b. 1978)
  - Catherine Waynick, 76, Anglican bishop (b. 1948)
- October 31
  - C. Arlen Beam, 95, jurist, judge of the U.S. District Court for the District of Nebraska (1981–1987) and the U.S. Court of Appeals for the Eighth Circuit (since 1987) (b. 1930)
  - Earl Cochran, 44, football player (Houston Texans, Green Bay Packers) (b. 1981)
  - Adam Greenberg, 88, Israeli-born cinematographer (The Terminator, Ghost, Rush Hour) (b. 1937)
  - Mel Leipzig, 90, painter and educator (b. 1935)
  - Jim Mundy, 91, singer-songwriter (b. 1934)
  - Jed Steele, 80, winemaker, bladder cancer (b. 1945)

== November ==
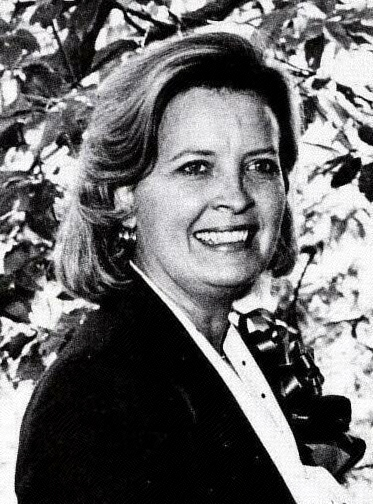
Martha Layne Collins

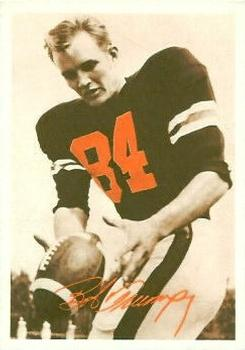
Bob Trumpy

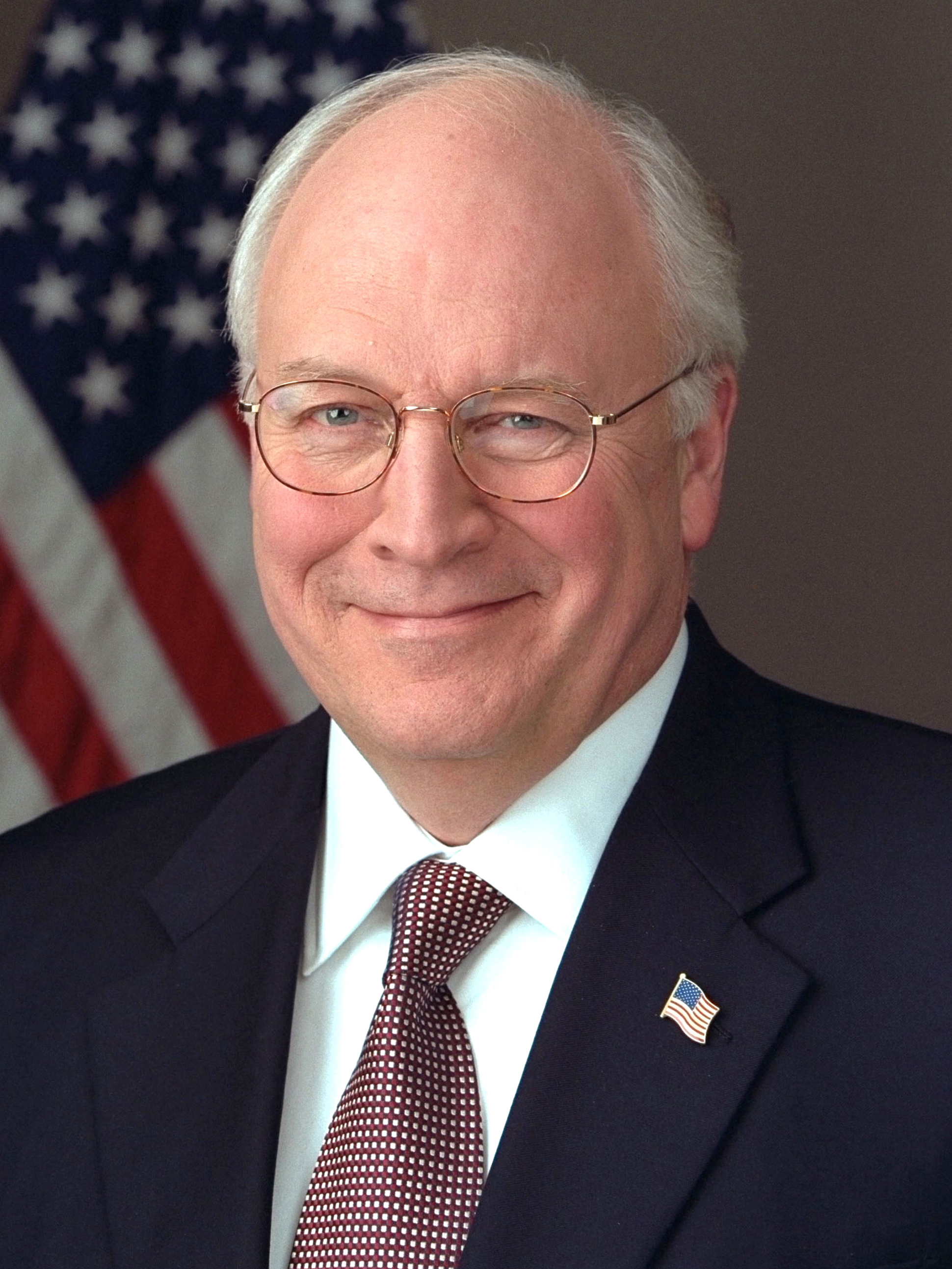
Dick Cheney

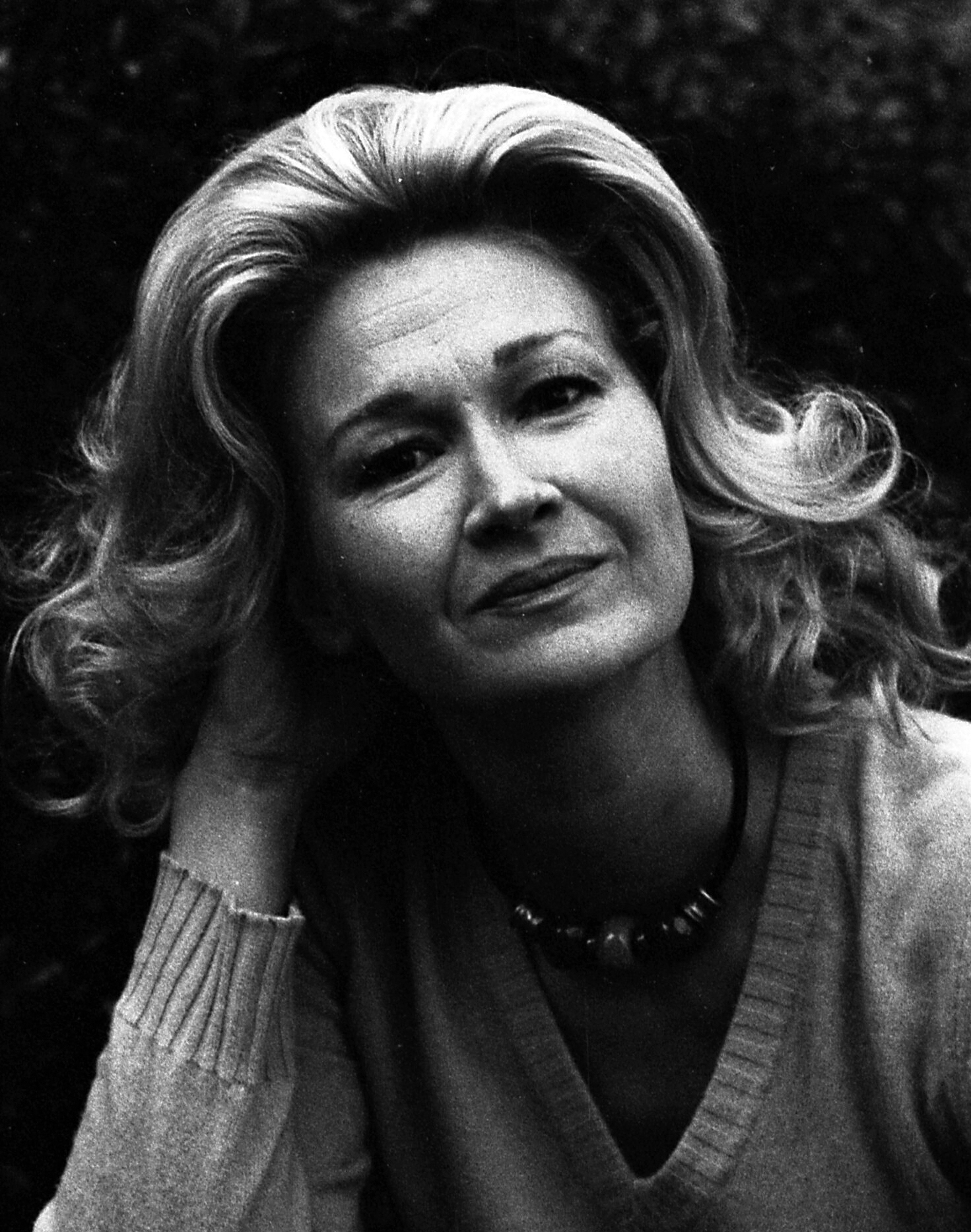
Diane Ladd

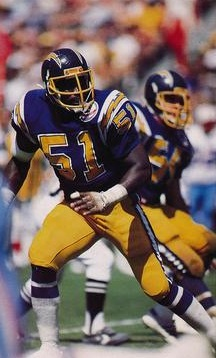
Woodrow Lowe

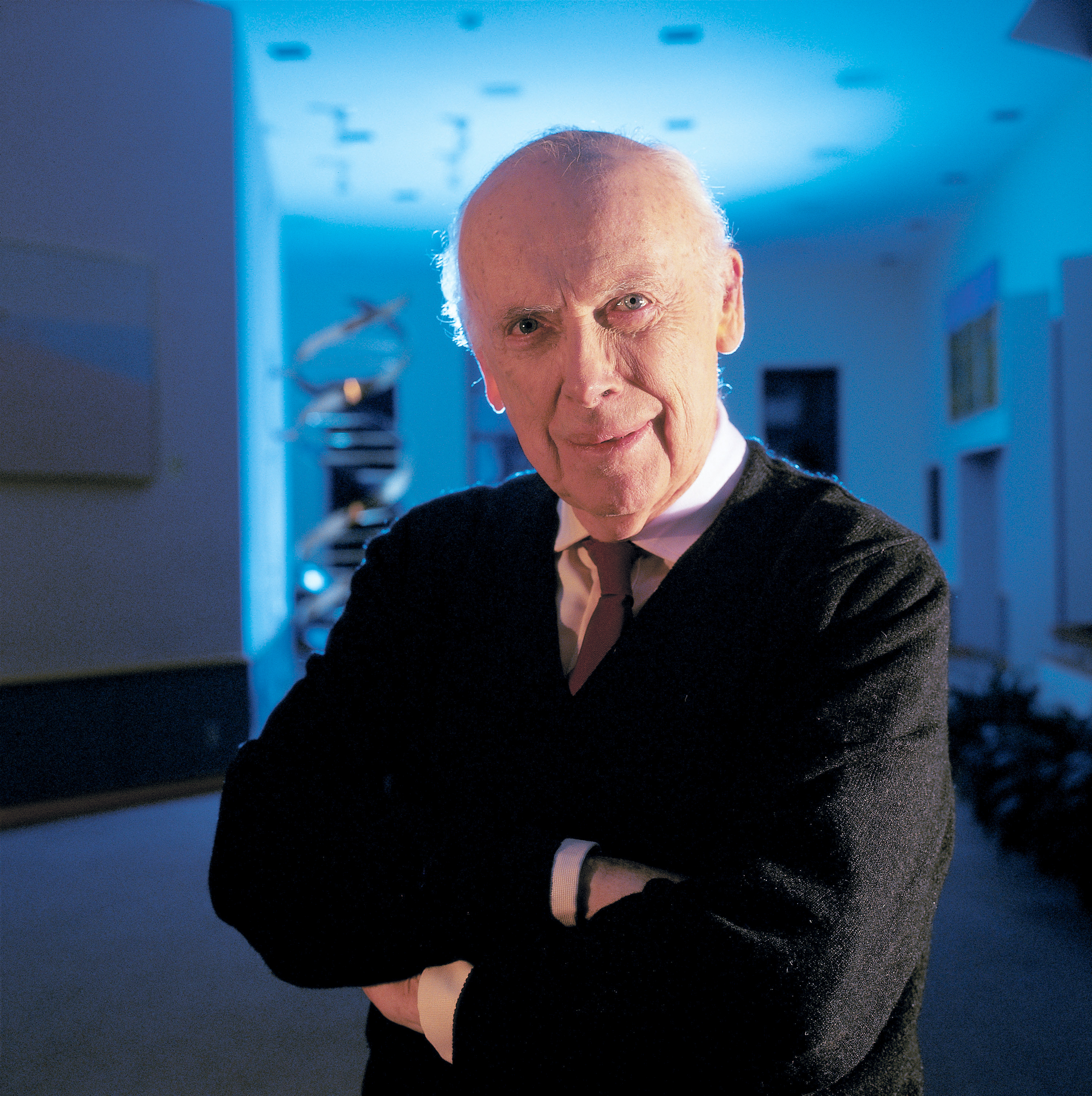
James Watson

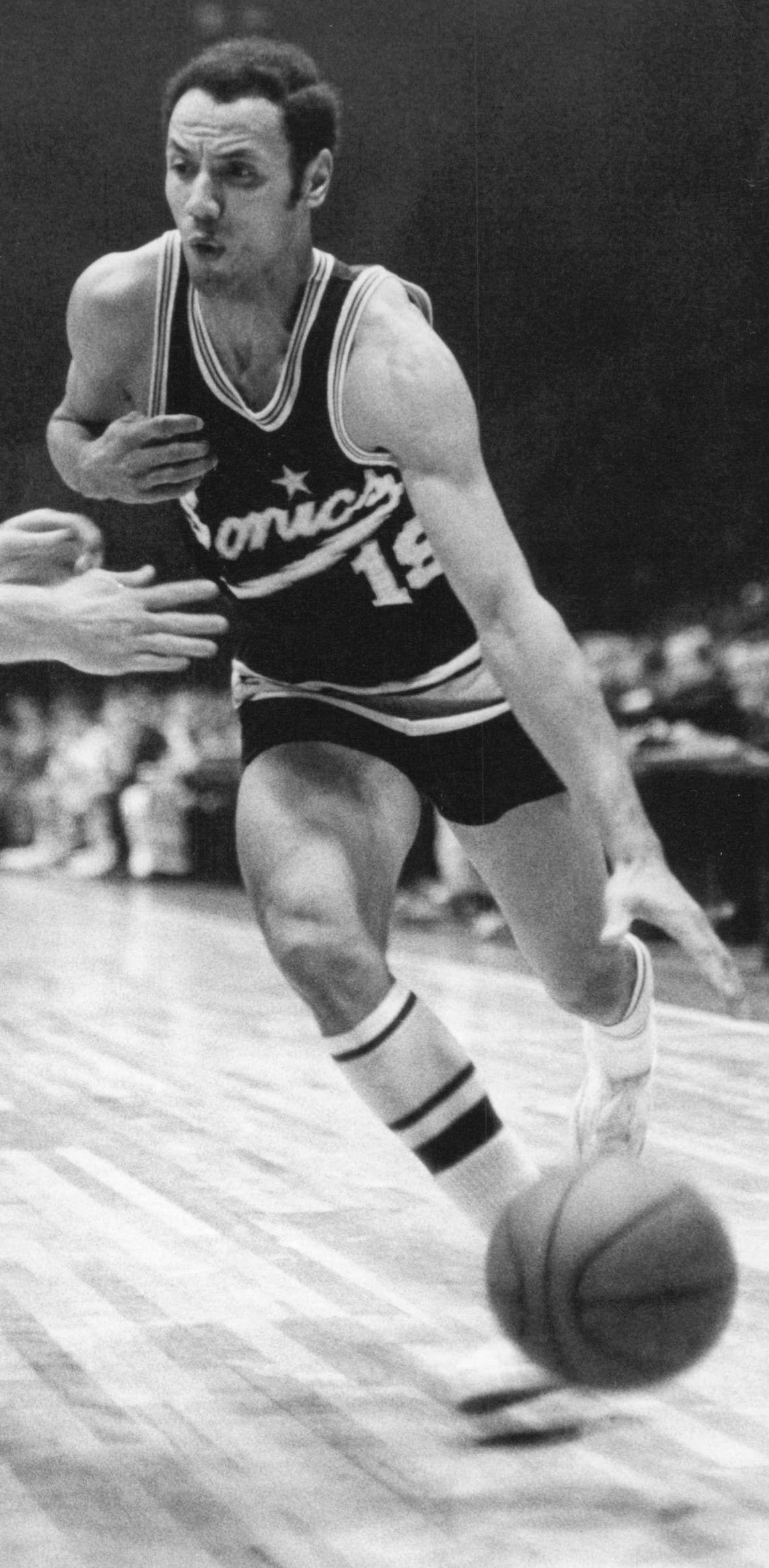
Lenny Wilkens

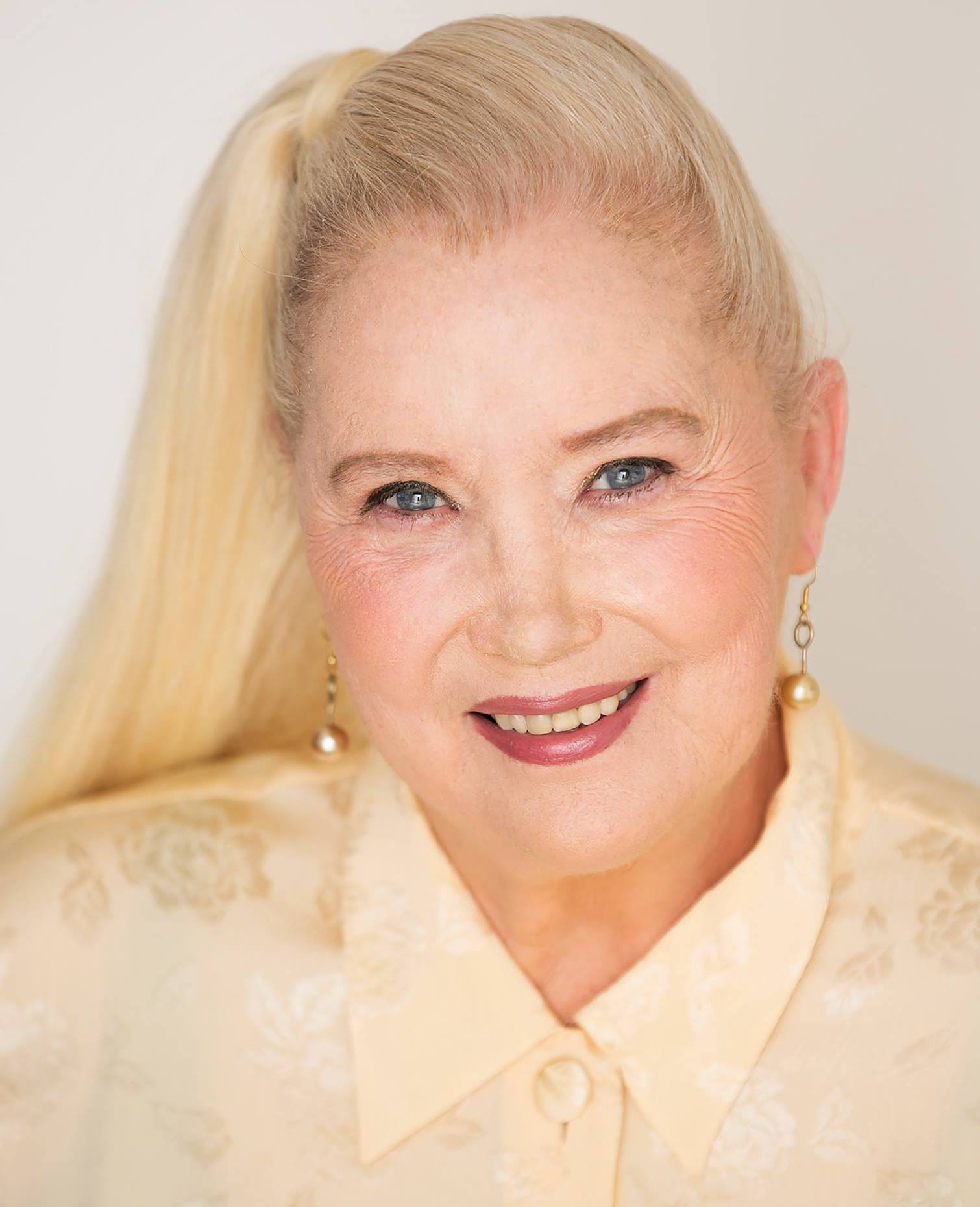
Sally Kirkland

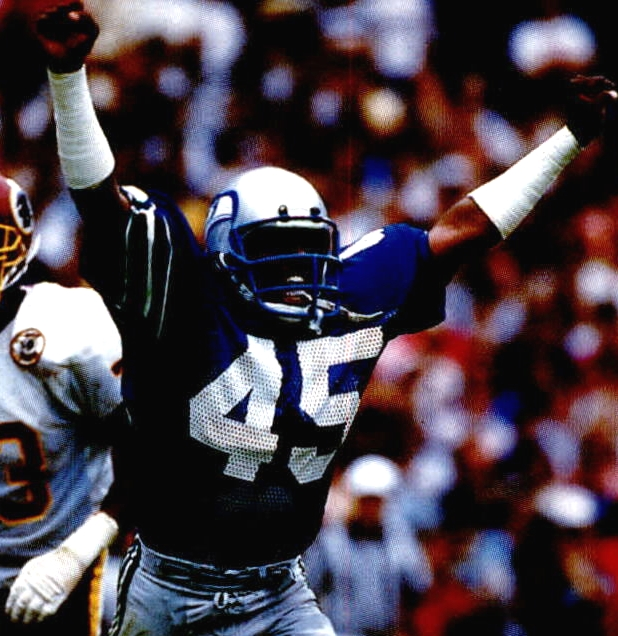
Kenny Easley

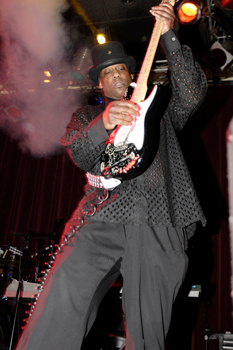
Jellybean Johnson

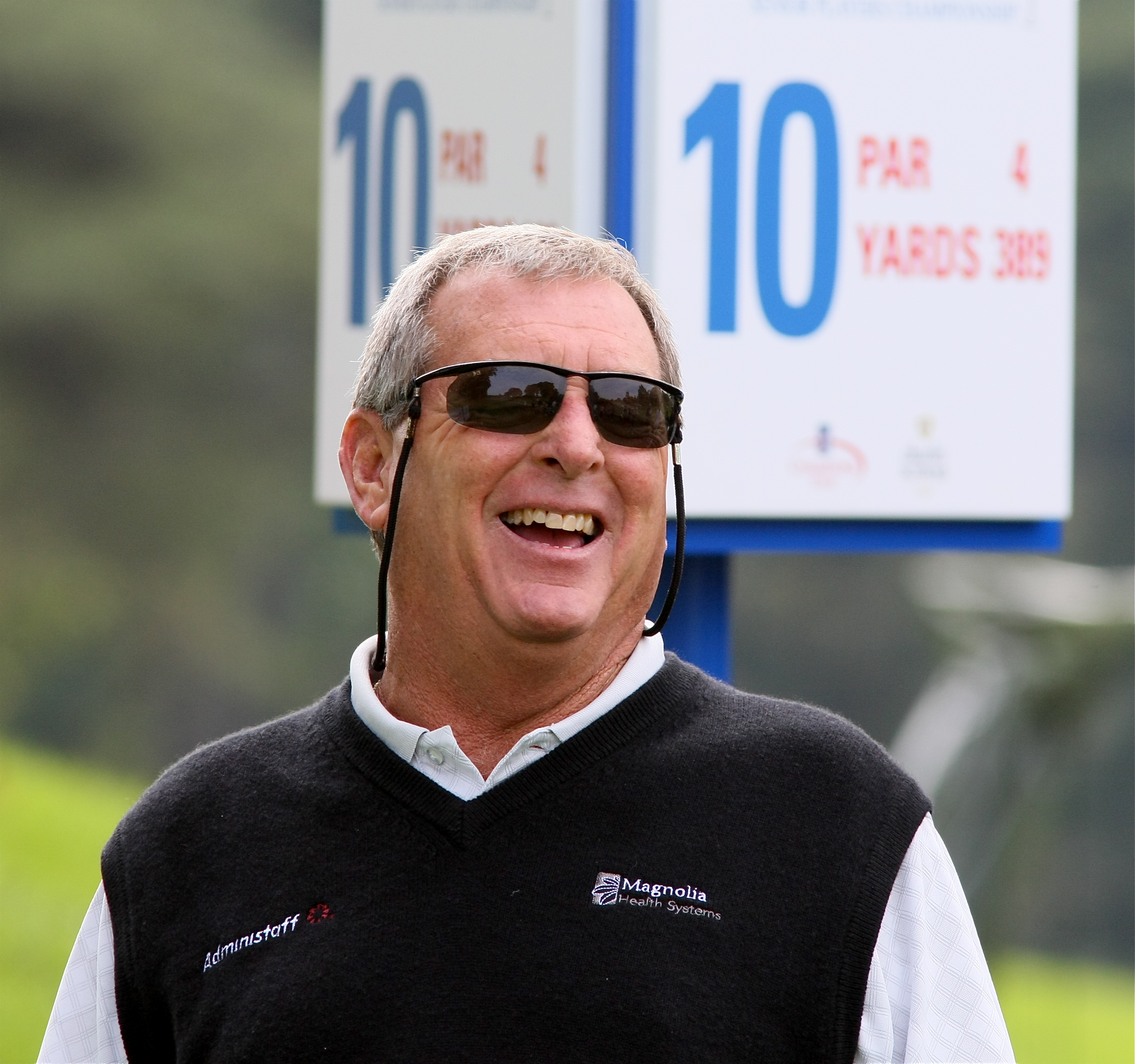
Fuzzy Zoeller

- November 1
  - Charles D. Baker, 97, businessman and politician, U.S. deputy secretary of health and human services (1983–1984) (b. 1928)
  - Beverly Burns, 76, airline pilot (b. 1949)
  - Michael Chamberlin, 88, biochemist and molecular biologist (b. 1937)
  - Martha Layne Collins, 88, politician, Governor of Kentucky (1983–1987), Lieutenant Governor of Kentucky (1979–1983) (b. 1936)
  - Ray Drummond, 78, jazz bassist, composer and bandleader (b. 1946)
  - Clyde Hart, 91, track and field coach (Baylor Bears) (b. 1934)
  - Robert A. Junell, 78, politician and jurist, member of the Texas House of Representatives (1989–2003), judge of the U.S. District Court for the Western District of Texas (since 2003) (b. 1947)
  - Edward Lone Fight, 86, First Nations leader, chairman of the Three Affiliated Tribes (1986–1990) (b. 1939)
  - Kenneth Minihan, 81, Air Force general, director of the National Security Agency (1996–1999) (b. 1943)
  - Stephen Morris, 79, politician, member (1993–2013) and president (2005–2012) of the Kansas Senate, president of the National Conference of State Legislatures (2011–2012) (b. 1946)
  - Duane Roberts, 88, businessman, inventor of the frozen burrito (b. 1936)
  - Anna Sandor, 76, Hungarian-born Canadian-American television writer (Hangin' In) (b. 1949)
  - Ralph Senensky, 102, television director (Star Trek: The Original Series, The Waltons, The Partridge Family) (b. 1923)
  - Tom Stolhandske, 94, football player (San Francisco 49ers, Edmonton Eskimos) (b. 1931)
  - Young Bleed, 51, rapper (b. 1974)
- November 2
  - George Emil Banks, 83, mass murderer (1982 Wilkes-Barre shootings) (b. 1942)
  - Joseph Byrd, 87, musician (The United States of America), songwriter ("Hard Coming Love"), and film composer (Health) (b. 1937)
  - Stanley M. Chesley, 89, lawyer (b. 1936)
  - James Diehl, 88, evangelical Christian minister (b. 1937)
  - Herbert A. Donovan Jr., 94, Episcopal cleric (b. 1931)
  - Donna Jean Godchaux, 78, singer (Grateful Dead) (b. 1947)
  - Mark Hallett, 82, neurologist (b. 1943)
  - Betty Harford, 98, actress (Gunsmoke, The Paper Chase, Dynasty) (b. 1927)
  - Donald Huffman, 90, academic (b. 1935)
  - William Duffy Keller, 91, jurist, judge of the U.S. District Court for Central California (since 1984) (b. 1934)
  - Walter Maslow, 97, actor (Atlas, Man with a Camera, The Cosmic Man) (b. 1928)
  - John Wesley Ryles, 74, country music singer ("Kay") and songwriter (b. 1950)
  - George Sacco, 89, politician, member of the Massachusetts House of Representatives (1963–1974) (b. 1936)
  - Jim Self, 82, tubist and film composer (Close Encounters of the Third Kind, Home Alone, Jurassic Park) (b. 1943)
  - Bob Trumpy, 80, football player (Cincinnati Bengals) and broadcaster (NBC Sports) (b. 1945)
  - Setti Warren, 55, politician, mayor of Newton, Massachusetts (2010–2018) (b. 1970)
- November 3
  - Judy Bell, 89, Hall of Fame golfer and golf administrator, president of the USGA (1996–1997) (b. 1936)
  - Charles Bidwill Jr., 97, businessman, owner of the Chicago / St. Louis Cardinals (1962–1972) (b. 1928)
  - Dick Cheney, 84, politician, 46th Vice President of the United States (2001–2009), 17th U.S. Secretary of Defense (1989–1993), U.S. Representative from Wyoming (1979–1989), 7th White House Chief of Staff (b. 1941)
  - Victor Conte, 75, musician and businessman, founder of Bay Area Laboratory Co-operative (b. 1950)
  - Robert Docter, 97, educator (b. 1928)
  - Barbara R. Hatton, 84, academic administrator, president of South Carolina State University (1993–1995) and Knoxville College (1997–2005) (b. 1941)
  - Diane Ladd, 89, actress (Alice Doesn't Live Here Anymore, Wild at Heart, Rambling Rose) (b. 1935)
- November 4
  - Keith Browner, 63, football player (Tampa Bay Buccaneers, Los Angeles Raiders, San Francisco 49ers) (b. 1962)
  - George C. Christie, 91, legal scholar (b. 1934)
  - Elizabeth Franz, 84, actress (Death of a Salesman, Sabrina, Christmas with the Kranks), Tony winner (1999) (b. 1941)
  - Penny Pence, 96, Olympic swimmer (1948) (b. 1929)
- November 5
  - Jay Stein, 87, theme park executive, founder of Universal Studios Florida (b. 1938)
  - Mary Ann Wilson, 87, fitness instructor and television host (Sit and Be Fit) (b. 1938)
- November 6
  - Richie Adubato, 87, basketball coach (Dallas Mavericks, Orlando Magic, New York Liberty) (b. 1937)
  - David J. Brightbill, 83, politician, member of the Pennsylvania State Senate (1981–2006) (b. 1942)
  - Mia Hamant, 21, soccer player (b. 19)
  - Frederick Hauck, 84, astronaut (STS-7) (b. 1941)
  - Chuck Kesey, 88, probiotic yogurt pioneer (b. 1937)
  - Paul Ignatius, 104, government official, Secretary of the Navy (1967–1969) (b. 1920)
  - Marshawn Kneeland, 24, football player (Dallas Cowboys) (b. 2001)
  - Woodrow Lowe, 71, Hall of Fame football player (San Diego Chargers) (b. 1954)
  - Wendy Wagner, 52, Olympic cross-country skier (2002, 2006) (b. 1973)
  - James Watson, 97, molecular biologist, Nobel Prize laureate (1962) (b. 1928)
- November 7
  - Thomas Childers, 78, historian (b. 1946)
  - Harvey Ferrero, 91, architect (b. 1934)
  - Jeanna Fine, 61, pornographic actress, (b. 1964)
  - Bill Ivey, 81, folklorist and author, chairman of the National Endowment for the Arts (1998–2001) (b. 1944)
  - Andrew Kleinfeld, 80, jurist, judge of the U.S. District Court for the District of Alaska (1986–1991) and the U.S. Court of Appeals for the Ninth Circuit (since 1991) (b. 1945)
  - Jerrol Williams, 58, football player (Pittsburgh Steelers, San Diego Chargers, Baltimore Ravens) (b. 1967)
  - Jeanette Winter, 86, author and illustrator (b. 1939)
- November 8
  - Mary Cybulski, 70, script supervisor (Life of Pi, Eternal Sunshine of the Spotless Mind) and still photographer (The Wolf of Wall Street) (b. 1955)
  - A. J. Meek, 84, photographer (b. 1941)
  - Manuel Miranda, 66, attorney and diplomat (b. 1959)
  - Larry Willingham, 76, football player (St. Louis Cardinals) (b. 1948)
- November 9
  - Ward Landrigan, 84, jeweler (b. 1941)
  - Larry McKibben, 78, politician, member of the Iowa Senate (1997–2008) (b. 1947)
  - Paul Tagliabue, 84, sports administrator, Commissioner of the NFL (1989–2006) (b. 1940)
  - Jeff Tobolski, 61, politician, mayor of McCook, Illinois (2007–2020) and member of the Cook County Board of Commissioners (2010–2020) (b. 1964)
  - Lenny Wilkens, 88, Hall of Fame basketball player (St. Louis Hawks, Seattle SuperSonics) and coach (Atlanta Hawks, Detroit Pistons) (b. 1937)
- November 10
  - Susan C. Anderson, 80, politician, member of the Wyoming House of Representatives (1991–1992) and Senate (1993) (b. 1945)
  - John R. Carpenter, 87, geochemist (b. 1938)
  - Akira Ishimaru, 97, electrical engineer (b. 1928)
  - Danny Seagren, 81, puppeteer and actor (The Electric Company, Sesame Street, Spidey Super Stories) (b. 1944)
  - Dorothy Vogel, 90, art collector (b. 1935)
- November 11
  - George Bloom, 68, television director (New Monkees) and visual effects artist (Pope John Paul II) (b. 1956)
  - Amber Czech, 20, welder (b. 2005)
  - Jim Duckworth, 86, baseball player (Washington Senators, Kansas City Athletics) (b. 1939)
  - Cleto Escobedo III, 59, musician (Cleto and the Cletones) and bandleader (Jimmy Kimmel Live!) (b. 1966)
  - Geoff Fox, 75, meteorologist (WTIC, WTNH) (b. 1950)
  - Sally Kirkland, 84, actress (Anna, Days of Our Lives, Coming Apart) (b. 1941)
  - Gary Lakes, 75, operatic heldentenor (b. 1950)
  - Kevin Mackey, 79, basketball coach (Cleveland State Vikings, Atlantic City Seagulls, Mansfield Hawks) (b. 1946)
  - John H. Miller, 100, Marine Corps lieutenant general (b. 1925)
  - Bert W. O'Malley, 88, endocrinologist (b. 1936)
  - Micheal Ray Richardson, 70, basketball player (New York Knicks, Golden State Warriors, New Jersey Nets) (b. 1955)
  - Helen Waddell, 95, baseball player (Springfield Sallies, Rockford Peaches, Battle Creek Belles) (b. 1930)
- November 12
  - Jim Avila, 70, television journalist (ABC News, 20/20) (b. 1955)
  - Freddie Baer, 73, artist (b. 1952)
  - Roy Hardemon, 63, politician, member of the Florida House of Representatives (2016–2018) (b. 1962)
  - Steve Kurtz, 67, artist (b. 1958)
  - Fern Michaels, 92, author (b. 1933)
- November 13
  - Larry Brooks, 75, Hall of Fame sports journalist (New York Post) (b. 1950)
  - Jim Jarrett, 88, college athletics administrator (Old Dominion Monarchs and Lady Monarchs) (b. 1937)
  - Joel Primack, 80, physicist (b. 1945)
- November 14
  - John Beam, 66, football coach (Laney College) (b. 1959)
  - Donald Brockett, 89, attorney (b. 1936)
  - Stephen Corey Bryant, 44, convicted spree killer (b. 1981)
  - Jeff Burkhart, 63, politician, member of the Tennessee House of Representatives (since 2022) (b. 1962)
  - Joe Goodwin Burnett, 77, Episcopalian prelate, bishop of Nebraska (2003–2011) (b. 1948)
  - John W. Colloton, 94, hospital administrator, chief executive of University of Iowa Hospitals & Clinics (1971–1993) (b. 1931)
  - Kenny Easley, 66, Hall of Fame football player (Seattle Seahawks) (b. 1959)
  - John Eklund Jr., 74, politician, member of the Wyoming House of Representatives (since 2011) (b. 1951)
  - Dan McGrath, 61, television writer (The Simpsons, King of the Hill, Saturday Night Live) (b. 1964)
  - Todd Snider, 59, singer-songwriter ("Trouble") (b. 1966)
  - Tom Timmermann, 85, baseball player (Detroit Tigers, Cleveland Indians) (b. 1940)
  - Alice Wong, 51, disability rights activist (b. 1974)
- November 15
  - Greg Carlson, 77, college football coach (Wabash Little Giants, Whittier Poets, St. Scholastica Saints) (b. 1948)
  - Kevin Mackin, 87, Roman Catholic priest and academic administrator, president of Siena University (1996–2007) (b. 1938)
  - Jayne McHugh, 65, volleyball player (national team, 1988 Summer Olympics) (b. 1960)
  - Hilly Michaels, 77, musician (Sparks) (b. 1948) (death announced on this date)
- November 16
  - F. Vernon Boozer, 89, politician, member of the Maryland House of Delegates (1971–1979) and Maryland Senate (1981–1999) (b. 1936)
  - Bob Caudle, 95, professional wrestling announcer (National Wrestling Alliance) (b. 1930)
  - Edward L. Cochran, 96, chemist (b. 1929)
  - Sid Davidoff, 86, political consultant (b. 1939)
  - Robert L. Devaney, 77, mathematician (b. 1948)
  - Richard Dunleavy, 92, Navy Rear Admiral (b. 1933)
  - Maxon Margiela, 21, rapper (b. 2004)
  - Sara Jordan Powell, 87, gospel singer (b. 1938)
- November 17
  - Walter Dowdle, 94, microbiologist (b. 1930)
  - Paul Ekman, 91, psychologist (b. 1934)
  - Violet L. Fisher, 86, bishop (b. 1939)
  - Newman A. Flanagan, 95, politician and attorney (b. 1930)
  - Bruce Gelb, 98, businessman and diplomat, U.S. ambassador to Belgium (b. 1927)
  - Murray Heimberg, 100, medical scientist (b. 1925)
  - Rebecca Heineman, 62, video game designer and programmer (The Bard's Tale III: Thief of Fate, Dragon Wars), co-founder of Interplay Entertainment (b. 1963)
  - Elzie Odom, 96, politician, mayor of Arlington, Texas (1997–2003) (b. 1929)
  - Iris Peterson, 104, flight attendant (b. 1921)
  - Willis Whichard, 85, politician and jurist, justice of the North Carolina Supreme Court (1986–1998) and member of the North Carolina Senate (1975–1980) and House of Representatives (1971–1975) (b. 1940)
  - DeWitt S. Williams, 86, temperance lobbyist and author (b. 1939)
- November 18
  - William A. Bardeen, 84, physicist (b. 1941)
  - Randy Burke, 70, football player (Baltimore Colts) (b. 1955)
  - Randy Jones, 75, baseball player (San Diego Padres, New York Mets) (b. 1950)
- November 19
  - Walt Aldridge, 70, singer-songwriter (The Shooters) (b. 1955)
  - Timothy App, 78, painter and educator (b. 1947)
  - Carl Ciarfalio, 72, actor and stuntman (The Fantastic Four, Casino, In the Line of Fire) (b. 1953)
  - Ronald Davis, 88, painter (b. 1937)
  - Fred Durhal Jr., 73, politician, member of the Michigan House of Representatives (2002, 2009–2014) (b. 1951)
  - Bart Shirley, 85, baseball player (Los Angeles Dodgers, New York Mets) (b. 1940)
- November 20
  - Al Andrews, 80, football player (Buffalo Bills) (b. 1945)
  - Stephen Downing, 87, screenwriter (MacGyver, Walking Tall, F/X: The Series) and journalist (b. 1938)
  - Mark Mellman, 70, pollster and political consultant (Democratic Majority for Israel) (b. 1955)
  - Chester Talton, 84, bishop (b. 1941)
- November 21
  - Lowell E. Baier, 85, environmental historian (b. 1940)
  - Leon Bates, 76, classical pianist (b. 1949)
  - Llyn Foulkes, 91, visual artist (b. 1934)
  - Kenneth F. Harper, 94, politician, secretary of state of Kentucky (1971–1972) and member of the Kentucky House of Representatives (1964–1968, 1982–1995) (b. 1931)
  - Jellybean Johnson, 69, musician (The Time), songwriter ("Criticize"), and record producer ("Black Cat") (b. 1956)
  - Peter Lindenfeld, 100, Austrian-born physicist (b. 1925)
  - Philip Perkis, 90, photographer (b. 1935)
  - Rodney Rogers, 54, basketball player (Denver Nuggets, Los Angeles Clippers, Phoenix Suns) (b. 1971)
  - Max Urick, 86, football coach (Wabash Little Giants) and athletic director (Iowa State Cyclones, Kansas State Wildcats) (b. 1939)
  - Lamarr Wilson, 48, internet personality (b. 1977)
- November 22
  - Jonathan Farwell, 93, actor (The Young and the Restless, The Doctors, The Edge of Night) (b. 1932)
  - Jamie T. Phelps, 84, theologian (b. 1941)
  - Richard H. Shultz, 78, scholar (b. 1947)
  - Huba Wass de Czege, 84, Hungarian-born Army Brigadier General (b. 1941)
- November 23
  - H. Rap Brown, 82, civil rights activist and convicted murderer, chairman of the Student Nonviolent Coordinating Committee (1967–1968) (b. 1943)
  - Jim Jacumin, 89, politician, member of the North Carolina Senate (2005–2011) (b. 1936)
  - Vanes Martirosyan, 39, Armenian-born Olympic boxer (2004) (b. 1986)
  - Dave Morehead, 82, baseball player (Boston Red Sox, Kansas City Royals) (b. 1943)
  - Kevin Ryan, 73, politician, member of the Connecticut House of Representatives (since 1993) (b. 1952)
  - Phil Upchurch, 84, jazz and blues guitarist (b. 1941)
- November 24
  - George Altman, 92, baseball player (Chicago Cubs, Tokyo / Lotte Orions) (b. 1933)
  - James Como, 78, literary scholar (b. 1946)
  - Viola Fletcher, 111, housekeeper and survivor of the Tulsa race massacre (b. 1914)
  - Bettye Frink, 92, politician, Alabama secretary of state (1959–1963) and state auditor (1963–1967, 1975–1983) (b. 1933)
  - Jodie Haydon, 80, politician, member of the Kentucky House of Representatives (1997–2005) (b. 1945)
  - Loraine Hutchins, 77, bisexual rights and feminist activist (Bi Any Other Name) (b. 1948)
  - David Rusk, 85, politician, mayor of Albuquerque (1977–1981) (b. 1940)
  - Randy Tyree, 85, politician, mayor of Knoxville (1976–1983) (b. 1940)
- November 25
  - Alicia R. Chacón, 87, politician (b. 1938)
  - James F. Conway, 93, politician, mayor of St. Louis (1977–1981), prostate cancer (b. 1932)
  - Charles W. Dyke, 90, Army Lieutenant General (b. 1935)
  - Reginald Jackson, 71, African Methodist Episcopal Church bishop (b. 1954)
  - Tim Prentice, 95, sculptor (b. 1930)
  - Theresa Anne Tull, 89, politician and diplomat, ambassador to Guyana (1987–1990) and Brunei (1993–1996) (b. 1936)
- November 26
  - Judy Cheeks, 71, singer ("Reach") (b. 1954)
  - Sam E. Haddon, 88, jurist, judge of the U.S. District Court for Montana (since 2001) (b. 1937)
  - Eugene Hasenfus, 84, CIA operative (Iran–Contra affair) (b. 1941)
  - William Jenkins, 88, South African-born veterinary scientist and academic administrator, president of the LSU System (1999–2007, 2012–2013) (b. 1937)
  - Marsha Kinder, 85, film scholar (b. 1940)
  - Jo Luck, 83, businesswoman, CEO of Heifer International (b. 1941)
  - Ralph Menzies, 67, convicted murderer (b. 1958)
  - Faith Winter, 45, politician, member of the Colorado Senate (since 2019) and House of Representatives (2015–2019) (b. 1980)
- November 27
  - Ann-Margaret Ferrante, 53, politician, member of the Massachusetts House of Representatives (since 2009) (b. 1972)
  - Robert A. M. Stern, 86, architect (15 Central Park West, 220 Central Park South), dean of the Yale School of Architecture (1998–2016) (b. 1939)
  - Holly Wright, 84, photographer (b. 1941)
  - Fuzzy Zoeller, 74, golfer, Masters (1979) and U.S. Open (1984) champion (b. 1951)
- November 28
  - Bill Butler, 88, football player (Green Bay Packers) (b. 1937)
  - Charles W. Sydnor Jr., 82, historian (b. 1943)
  - Daniel Woodrell, 72, novelist (Give Us a Kiss, Winter's Bone) (b. 1953)
- November 29
  - DéLana R. A. Dameron, 40, writer and poet (b. 1985)
  - Leslie Fish, 81, folk musician ("Banned from Argo"), author and political activist (b. 1944)
  - Dwight Morrell Smith, 94, academic, chancellor of the University of Denver (1984–1989) (b. 1931)
- November 30
  - Robert H. Edwards, 90, academic administrator, president of Carleton College (1977–1986) and Bowdoin College (1990–2001) (b. 1935)
  - Bob Foster, 78, politician, mayor of Long Beach, California (2006–2014) (b. 1947)
  - Billy Nichols, 85, musician and songwriter ("Do It ('Til You're Satisfied)") (b. 1940)
  - Harmon Seawel, 82, politician, member of the Arkansas House of Representatives (1999–2005) (b. 1943)

== December ==
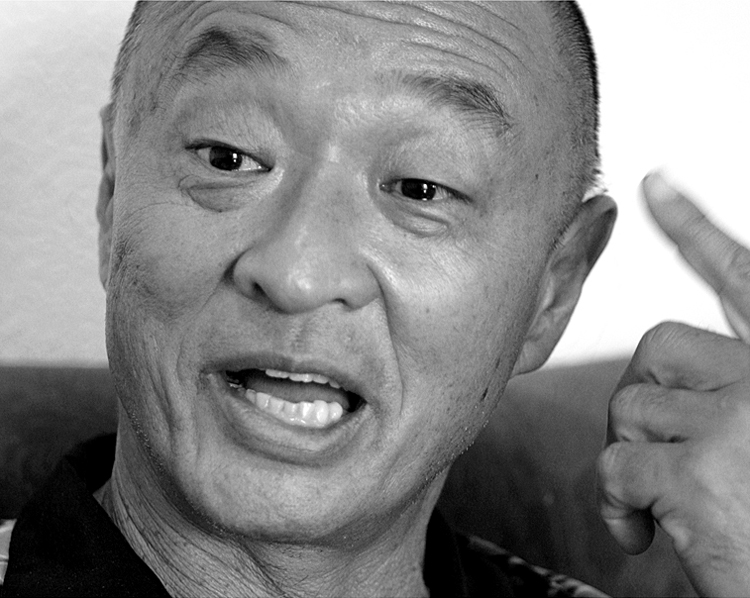
Cary-Hiroyuki Tagawa

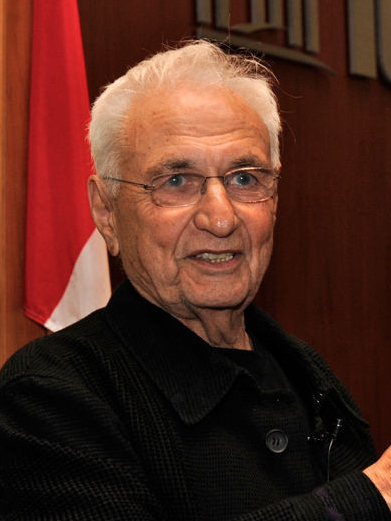
Frank Gehry

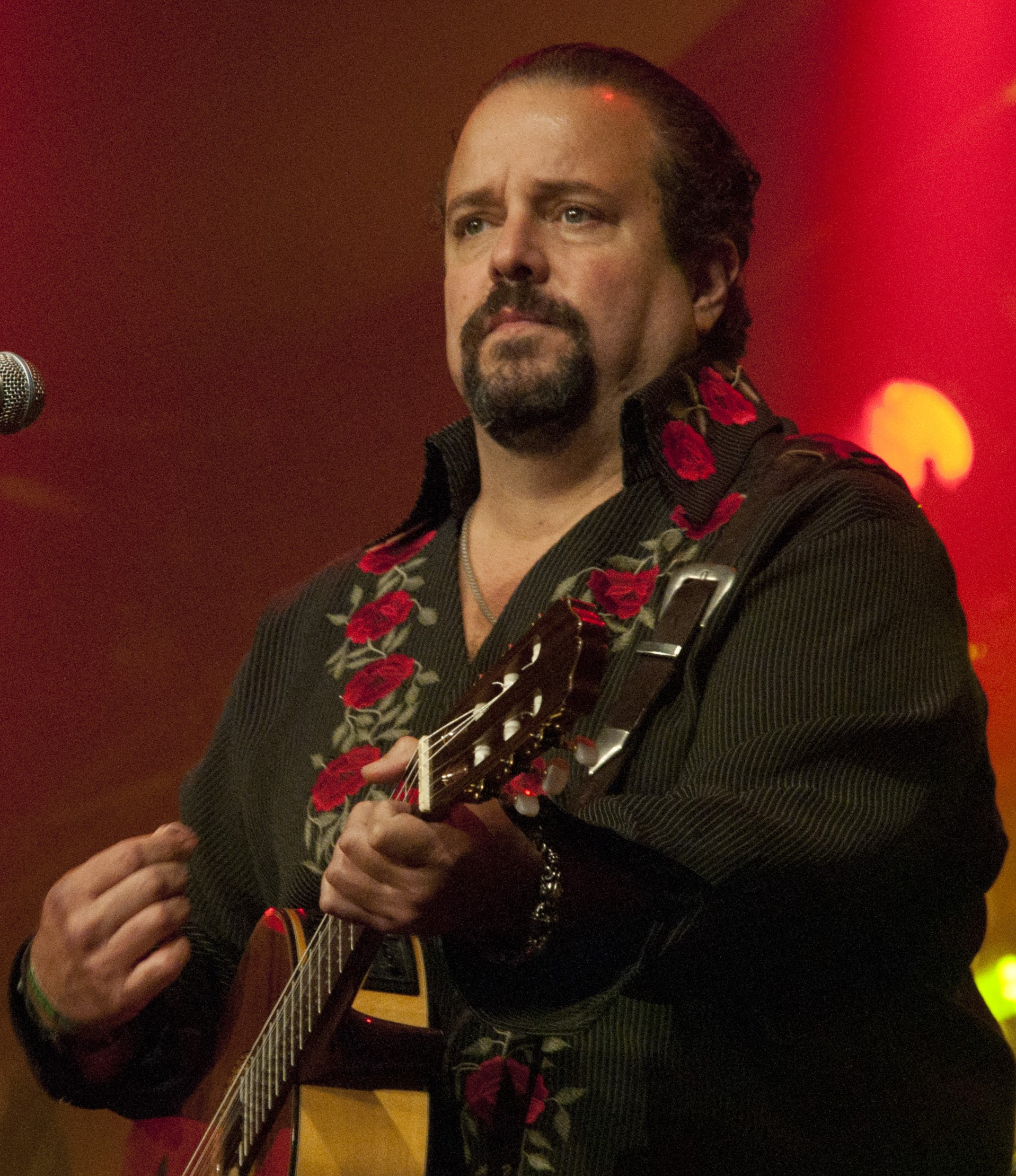
Raul Malo

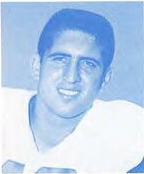
George Mira

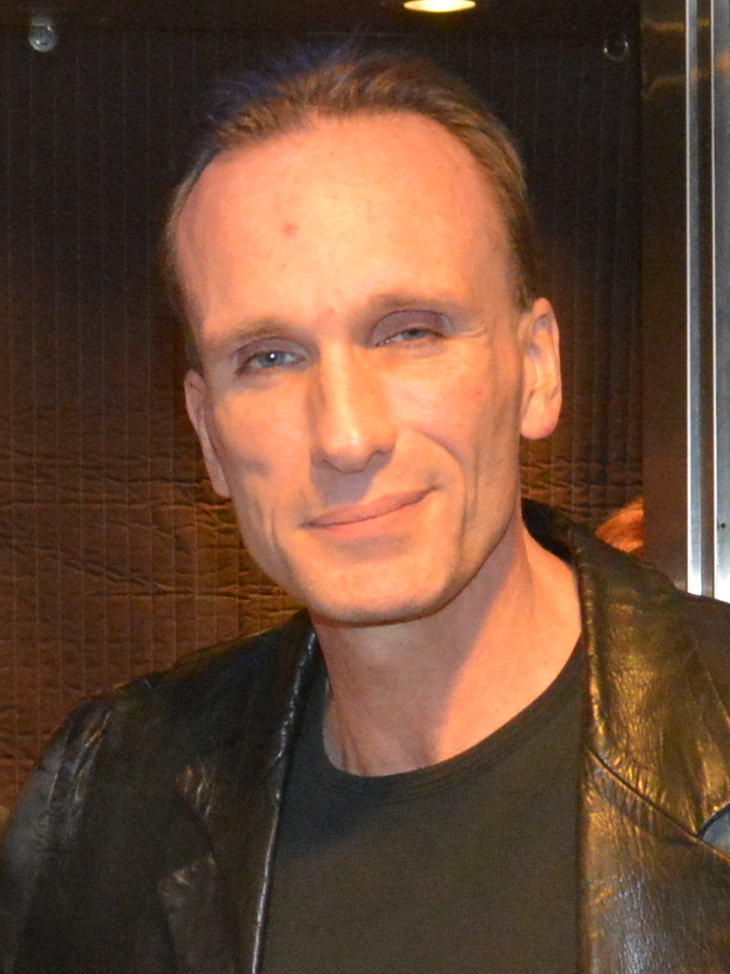
Peter Greene

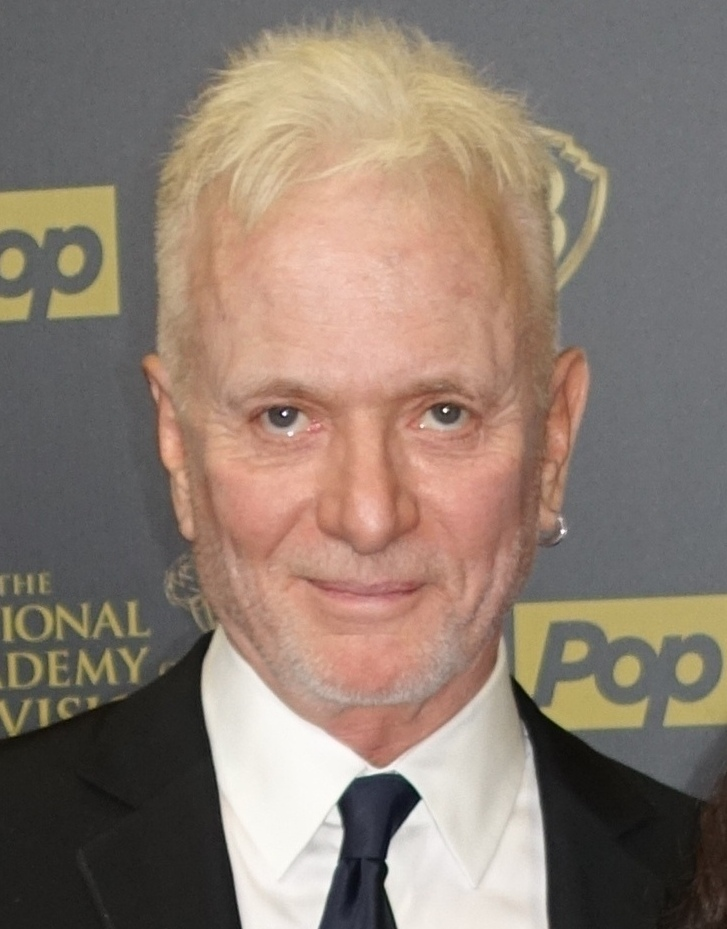
Anthony Geary

- December 1
  - Ann Bedsole, 95, politician, member of the Alabama Senate (1982–1994) (b. 1930)
  - Elden Campbell, 57, basketball player (Los Angeles Lakers, Detroit Pistons, Charlotte Hornets) (b. 1968)
  - Ebo Elder, 46, boxer (b. 1978)
  - Bruce Niemi, 76, politician, member of the Oklahoma House of Representatives (1991–1993) (b. 1949)
  - Poorstacy, 26, musician (b. 1999)
  - Coleen Seng, 89, politician, mayor of Lincoln, Nebraska (2003–2007) (b. 1936)
  - Luci Shaw, 96, British-born poet and essayist (b. 1928)
  - Grace Smith, 79, actress (Clerks) (b. 1945)
- December 2
  - Criscilla Anderson, 45, television personality (Country Ever After) (b. 1980) (death announced on this date)
  - Michael Annett, 39, racing driver (NASCAR, ARCA Menards Series) (b. 1986)
  - Darwin Deason, 85, information technology services founder (Affiliated Computer Services) (b. 1940)
  - David Matalon, 82, film producer (What's Eating Gilbert Grape, Color of Night) and co-founder of TriStar Pictures (b. 1943)
  - James H. Payne, 84, jurist, judge (since 2001) of the U.S. District Courts of Eastern, Northern, and Western Oklahoma and chief judge (2002–2017) of the U.S. District Court of Eastern Oklahoma (b. 1941)
  - Margaret Jane Wray, 62, soprano (b. 1962)
- December 3
  - Levi Aron, 49, convicted killer (b. 1976)
  - Devin Battley, 75, motorcycle racer and businessman (b. 1950)
  - D. L. Coburn, 87, playwright (The Gin Game) (b. 1938)
  - Kevin Coe, 78, serial rapist (b. 1947)
  - Steve Cropper, 84, guitarist (Booker T. & the M.G.'s), songwriter ("In the Midnight Hour"), and record producer ("(Sittin' On) The Dock of the Bay") (b. 1941)
  - R. Bruce Dold, 70, journalist (Chicago Tribune) (b. 1955)
  - Whitney Paul, 72, football player (Kansas City Chiefs, New Orleans Saints) (b. 1953)
  - Abdulaziz Sachedina, 83, Tanzanian-born Islamic scholar (b. 1942)
  - Charles Norman Shay, 101, army medic (16th Infantry Regiment) and writer (b. 1924)
- December 4
  - Robert B. Fiske, 94, trial attorney, U.S. attorney for the Southern District of New York (1976–1980) (b. 1930)
  - Steve Hertz, 80, baseball player (Houston Colt .45s) (b. 1945)
  - Claire Ortiz Hill, 74, scholar and translator (b. 1951)
  - Roy Kramer, 96, college football coach (Central Michigan Chippewas) and athletics administrator (Vanderbilt Commodores, Southeastern Conference) (b. 1929)
  - Cary-Hiroyuki Tagawa, 75, Japanese-born actor (Licence to Kill, Mortal Kombat, The Man in the High Castle) (b. 1950)
- December 5
  - Josh Becker, 67, film and television director (Xena: Warrior Princess) and screenwriter (b. 1958)
  - Kenneth W. Ford, 99, theoretical physicist and writer (b. 1926)
  - Frank Gehry, 96, Canadian-American architect (Guggenheim Museum Bilbao, Gehry Residence, Louis Vuitton Foundation) (b. 1929)
  - Camryn Magness, 26, singer(b. 1999)
  - Mark Jay Mirsky, 86, writer and academic, co-founder of Fiction (b. 1939)
  - Alex R. Munson, 84, jurist, judge (since 1988) and chief judge (1988–2010) of the District Court for the Northern Mariana Islands (b. 1941)
- December 6
  - Tom Hicks, 79, sports owner (Liverpool F.C., Texas Rangers) and private equity investor, co-founder of HM Capital Partners (b. 1946)
  - Nick Joanides, 55, racing driver (ARCA Menards Series) (b. 1970) (death announced on this date)
  - Jerry Kasenetz, 82, music producer ("Yummy Yummy Yummy", "Little Bit O' Soul", "Simon Says") (b. 1943)
  - Jonah Kinigstein, 102, artist (b. 1923)
  - Rory MacLeod, 70, bassist (Roomful of Blues) (b. 1955)
- December 7
  - Christine Choy, 73, filmmaker (Who Killed Vincent Chin?) (b. 1949)
  - Thomas E. Dewberry, 74, politician and judge, member of the Maryland House of Delegates (1989–2002) (b. 1951)
  - Sandra Segal Ikuta, 71, jurist, judge of the U.S. Court of Appeals for the Ninth Circuit (since 2006) (b. 1954)
  - Peg Kehret, 89, author (Earthquake Terror, I'm Not Who You Think I Am, Small Steps: The Year I Got Polio) (b. 1936)
  - Stephen Pearton, 68, Australian-born materials scientist(b. 1957)
  - Bernie Toorish, 94, Canadian-born singer (The Four Lads) (b. 1931)
- December 8
  - Gordon Goodwin, 70, musician (Big Phat Band), composer and conductor, four-time Grammy Award winner (b. 1954)
  - Kate Ho, 53, British-born economist (b. 1972)
  - Raul Malo, 60, musician (The Mavericks) and songwriter ("All You Ever Do Is Bring Me Down", "Dance the Night Away"), Grammy winner (1996) (b. 1965)
  - George C. Pratt, 97, jurist, judge of the U.S. District Court for Eastern New York (1976–1982) and U.S. Court of Appeals for the Second Circuit (1982–1995) (b. 1928)
  - Bill Ratliff, 89, politician, lieutenant governor of Texas (2000–2003) and member of the Texas Senate (1989–2004) (b. 1936)
  - Jubilant Sykes, 71, baritone (b. 1954)
  - Cora Weiss, 91, human rights activist (b. 1934)
  - John Noble Wilford, 92, journalist (The New York Times) and author (b. 1933)
- December 9
  - Bob Allen, 79, basketball player (San Francisco Warriors) (b. 1946)
  - Frank Bruneel, 90, politician, member of the Idaho House of Representatives (1994–2002) (b. 1935)
  - Arthur L. Carter, 93, banker, publisher, and visual artist (b. 1931)
  - D. G. Martin, 85, lawyer and politician (b. 1940)
  - George Mira, 83, football player (San Francisco 49ers, Philadelphia Eagles, Montreal Alouettes) (b. 1942)
  - Rod Paige, 92, academic, football coach (Jackson State Tigers, Texas Southern Tigers) and government official, U.S. secretary of education (2001–2005) (b. 1933)
  - Jeff Thorne, 53, college football coach (North Central Cardinals, Western Michigan Broncos) (b. 1972)
  - Jeff Wexler, 78, sound engineer (The Last Samurai, Independence Day, Almost Famous) (b. 1947)
- December 10
  - Lewis Entz, 94, politician, member of the Colorado House of Representatives (1983–1999) and Senate (2001–2007) (b. 1931)
  - Jeff Garcia, 50, comedian and actor (Jimmy Neutron: Boy Genius, Barnyard, Mr. Box Office) (b. 1975)
  - Robbie Kondor, 70, film composer (Happiness, The Suburbans, Forever Fabulous), arranger and session musician (b. 1955)
  - John Varley, 78, author (Titan, Millennium, Steel Beach) (b. 1947)
  - Jim Ward, 66, voice actor (Ratchet & Clank, The Fairly OddParents) and radio personality (The Stephanie Miller Show) (b. 1959)
- December 11
  - Janet Fish, 87, realist artist (b. 1938)
  - David Gold, 75, talk radio host (KLIF, KSFO) (b. 1950) (death announced on this date)
  - Gerald McCormick, 63, politician, member of the Tennessee House of Representatives (2004–2018) (b. 1962)
  - Harold Wayne Nichols, 64, serial rapist and convicted murderer (b. 1960)
  - Sam Sommers, 86, racing driver (b. 1939)
- December 12
  - Amato Berardi, 67, Italian-born politician, deputy (2008–2013) (b. 1958)
  - Bob Burns III, 90, actor (The Ghost Busters, Rat Pfink a Boo Boo, The Naked Monster), archivist and historian (b. 1935)
  - David Carlin, 87, politician, member of the Rhode Island Senate (1981–1993) (b. 1938)
  - James H. Flatley III, 91, naval rear admiral (b. 1934)
  - Peter Greene, 60, actor (Pulp Fiction, The Mask, Clean, Shaven) (b. 1965)
  - Manny Guerra, 86, Tejano musician (Sunny and the Sunglows) and record producer (b. 1939)
  - Marilyn Mazur, 70, American-born Danish percussionist (b. 1955)
  - Leonard Morse, 96, physician and public health official (b. 1929)
  - Greg Thayer, 76, baseball player (Minnesota Twins) (b. 1949)
  - Paul Wiggin, 91, Hall of Fame football player (Cleveland Browns, Stanford Cardinal), coach (Stanford Cardinal) and executive, NFL champion (1964) (b. 1934)
- December 13
  - Richard Bell, 88, football coach (South Carolina Gamecocks) (b. 1937)
  - Ryan McDonough, 46, cardiologist and member of the Alaska State Medical Board (b. 1979)
  - Abraham Quintanilla, 86, musician and talent manager (Selena) (b. 1939)
  - Robert J. Samuelson, 79, journalist (The Washington Post, Newsweek) (b. 1945)
  - Dave Ward, 86, American broadcast journalist (KTRK-TV) (b. 1939)
- December 14
  - Carl Carlton, 73, singer ("Everlasting Love", "She's a Bad Mama Jama (She's Built, She's Stacked)") and songwriter (b. 1952)
  - Garrett Ford Sr., 80, football player (Denver Broncos) (b. 1945)
  - Anthony Geary, 78, actor (General Hospital, UHF, Teacher's Pet) (b. 1947)
  - Bob Hannah, 93, college baseball coach (Delaware Fightin' Blue Hens) (b. 1931)
  - Timothy Light, 87, sinologist (b. 1938)
  - Michele Singer Reiner, 70, photographer and film producer (Shock and Awe, Albert Brooks: Defending My Life, God & Country) (b. 1955)
  - Rob Reiner, 78, actor (All in the Family) and film director (This Is Spinal Tap, When Harry Met Sally...), Emmy winner (1974, 1978) (b. 1947)
  - Solomon Grundy, 64, professional wrestler (WCCW, CMLL, AAA) (b. 1961)
  - Mike White, 89, football coach (California Golden Bears, Illinois Fighting Illini, Oakland Raiders) (b. 1936)
- December 15
  - Jack Abendschan, 82, football player (Saskatchewan Roughriders) (b. 1942)
  - William J. Bauer, 99, jurist, judge of the U.S. District Court for Northern Illinois (1971–1975) and judge (since 1974) and chief judge (1986–1993) of the U.S. Court of Appeals for the Seventh Circuit (b. 1926)
  - Mike Campbell, 61, baseball player (Seattle Mariners, San Diego Padres, Chicago Cubs) (b. 1964)
  - Frank C. Cooksey, 92, politician and activist, mayor of Austin, Texas (1985–1988) (b. 1933)
  - Joe Ely, 78, musician (The Flatlanders) (b. 1947)
  - Rudy Kuechenberg, 82, football player (Chicago Bears, Cleveland Browns, Green Bay Packers) (b. 1943)
  - Lane Rogers, 31, actor (b. 1994)
  - Therrell C. Smith, 108, ballet dancer (b. 1917)
  - Steve Taneyhill, 52, football player (South Carolina Gamecocks) (b. 1973)
- December 16
  - Yitzchak Abadi, 92, Venezuelan-born Orthodox rabbi (b. 1933)
  - Richard Browning, 73, politician, member of the West Virginia House of Delegates (2000–2008) and Senate (2008–2012) (b. 1952) (death announced on this date)
  - Gil Gerard, 82, actor (Buck Rogers in the 25th Century, Airport '77, The Doctors) (b. 1943)
  - Albert Hall, 67, baseball player (Atlanta Braves, Pittsburgh Pirates) (b. 1958)
  - Chuck Neinas, 93, athletics administrator, commissioner of the Big Eight Conference (1971–1980) (b. 1932)
  - Norman Podhoretz, 95, magazine editor and writer, editor-in-chief of Commentary (1960–1995) (b. 1930)
- December 17
  - Kevin Arkadie, 68, television writer and producer (New York Undercover, Chicago Hope, The Shield) (b. 1957)
  - Peter Arnett, 91, New Zealand-born journalist (Associated Press), Pulitzer Prize winner (1966) (b. 1934)
  - Juli Erickson, 86, voice actress (Fullmetal Alchemist, Basilisk, Fairy Tail) (b. 1939)
  - Victor Grossman, 97, publicist and author (b. 1928)
  - Barry Mitchell, 60, basketball player (Youngstown Pride, Quad City Thunder) (b. 1965)
  - Eddie Sotto, 67, experiential designer, mixed-media producer and conceptualist (Walt Disney Imagineering) (b. 1958)
- December 18
  - Rochelle Abramson, violinist
  - Greg Biffle, 55, stock car racing driver (NASCAR Cup Series, NASCAR O'Reilly Auto Parts Series, NASCAR Craftsman Truck Series) (b. 1969)
  - Alan Harper, 68, politician, member of the Alabama House of Representatives (2006–2018) (b. 1957)
  - Jim Hunt, 88, politician, governor (1977–1985, 1993–2001) and lieutenant governor of North Carolina (1973–1977) (b. 1937)
  - Bethanne McCarthy Patrick, 55, politician, member of the New Jersey General Assembly (2022–2024) (b. 1970)
  - Terry O'Malley Seidler, 92, businesswoman, owner of the Los Angeles Dodgers (1979–1997) (b. 1933)
  - Wilma M. Sherrill, 86, politician, member of the North Carolina House of Representatives (1995–2007) (b. 1939)
  - Helen Siff, 88, actress (You Don't Mess with the Zohan, Hail, Caesar!, The Karate Kid) (b. 1937)
  - Frank A. Walls, 58, convicted serial killer (b. 1967)
- December 19
  - Lou Cannon, 92, journalist (The Washington Post) and presidential biographer (Ronald Reagan) (b. 1933)
  - Andy Kosco, 84, baseball player (Minnesota Twins, Los Angeles Dodgers, Cincinnati Reds) (b. 1941)
  - Robert Lindsey, 90, author (The Falcon and the Snowman, An American Life) (b. 1935)
  - Robert Mnuchin, 92, art dealer and banker (b. 1933)
  - James Ransone, 46, actor (The Wire, It Chapter Two, The Black Phone) (b. 1979)
- December 20
  - George Cowden, 94, politician, member of the Texas House of Representatives (1963–1967) and chairman of the Public Utility Commission of Texas (1978–1982) (b. 1930)
  - Rich McGeorge, 77, Hall of Fame football player (Green Bay Packers) and coach (Birmingham Stallions, Miami Dolphins) (b. 1948)
  - Ira "Ike" Schab, 105, Navy sailor, survivor of the attack on Pearl Harbor (b. 1920)
- December 21
  - Sigmund Abeles, 91, artist (b. 1934)
  - Robert A. Flaten, 91, diplomat, ambassador to Rwanda (1990–1993) (b. 1934)
  - Clifton McNeil, 86, football player (Cleveland Browns, Washington Redskins, New York Giants), NFL champion (1964) (b. 1939)
  - Patricia Montandon, 96, author and socialite (b. 1928)
  - Betty Reid Soskin, 104, park ranger (b. 1921)
  - Wayne F. Whittow, 92, politician, member of the Wisconsin State Assembly (1961–1967) and Senate (1967–1976) (b. 1933)
  - Vince Zampella, 55, video game developer (Call of Duty, Titanfall, Star Wars Jedi: Fallen Order) (b. 1970)
- December 22
  - Adam the Woo, 51, YouTuber (b. 1974)
  - Norton Barnhill, 72, basketball player (Washington State Cougars, Seattle SuperSonics, Atenas de Córdoba) (b. 1953)
  - Pat Finn, 60, actor (The Middle, Murphy Brown, Dude, Where's My Car?) (b. 1965)
  - Michael F. Flaherty Sr., 89, politician, member of the Massachusetts House of Representatives (1967–1991) (b. 1936)
  - Tom Maentz, 91, football player (Michigan Wolverines) and manufacturing company owner (b. 1934)
  - Tommy E. Mitchum, 76, politician, member of the Arkansas House of Representatives (1973–1992) (b. 1949)
  - Howard Tucker, 103, neurologist, world's oldest practicing doctor (b. 1922)
- December 23
  - Hisham N. Ashkouri, 77, architect (b. 1948)
  - Dick Schulze, 96, politician, member of the U.S. House of Representatives (1975–1993) (b. 1929)
  - Orville Smidt, 82, politician, member of the South Dakota Senate (2005–2009) and House of Representatives (1997–2005) (b. 1943)
- December 24
  - Carolyn R. Dimmick, 96, jurist, justice of the Washington Supreme Court (1981–1985), judge (since 1985) and chief judge (1994–1997) of the U.S. District Court for the Western District of Washington (b. 1929)
  - Larry J. Edgell, 79, politician, member of the West Virginia Senate (1998–2014) (b. 1946)
  - Neil Frank, 94, meteorologist (KHOU), director of the National Hurricane Center (1973–1987) (b. 1931)
  - Howie Klein, 77, record label executive (Sire Records, Reprise Records) and activist (b. 1948)
- December 25
  - Mickey Lee, 35, television personality (Big Brother 27) (b. 1990)
  - Stu Phillips, 92, Canadian-born country singer (b. 1933)
  - Amos Poe, 76, film director, producer, and screenwriter (The Foreigner, Subway Riders, La commedia di Amos Poe) (b. 1949)
  - Carl J. Stewart Jr., 89, politician, member (1967–1980) and speaker (1977–1980) of the North Carolina House of Representatives (b. 1936)
- December 26
  - Melanie Watson Bernhardt, 57, actress (Diff'rent Strokes) (b. 1968)
  - Don Bryant, 83, rhythm and blues singer and songwriter ("I Can't Stand the Rain") (b. 1942)
  - Desiré Dubounet, 74, alternative medicine inventor and filmmaker (b. 1951)
  - Robert Gaudreau, 81, Olympic ice hockey player (1968) (b. 1944)
  - Kristina Gjerde, 68, ocean conservationist (b. 1957)
  - Allen I. Olson, 87, politician, governor of North Dakota (1981–1985) (b. 1938)
- December 27
  - Dave Downey, 84, basketball player (Illinois Fighting Illini) (b. 1941)
  - Lou Gerstner, 83, technology executive, CEO of IBM (1993–2002) (b. 1942)
  - Gary Graffman, 97, classical pianist (b. 1928)
  - Lee Guerette, 76, politician, member of the New Hampshire House of Representatives (2014–2016) (b. 1949).
  - Jeffrey R. Holland, 85, LDS Church leader, member (since 1994) and president (since 2023) of the Quorum of the Twelve Apostles (b. 1940)
  - Laurence Thomas, 76, philosopher (b. 1949)
  - Richard D. Young, 83, politician, member of the Indiana Senate (1988–2014) (b. 1942)
- December 28
  - Stewart Cheifet, 87, television host (Computer Chronicles) (b. 1938)
  - Joel Habener, 88, physician (b. 1937)
  - Ed Wallace, 72, radio personality (b. 1953)
- December 29
  - Rhoda Billings, 88, lawyer and justice, chief justice of the North Carolina Supreme Court (1986) (b. 1937)
  - Carmen de Lavallade, 94, dancer and choreographer (b. 1931)
  - Michael Lahti, 80, politician, member of the Michigan House of Representatives (2007–2011) (b. 1945)
  - Michael Lippman, 79, music manager (David Bowie, George Michael, Matchbox Twenty) (b. 1946)
  - John Mulrooney, 67, comedian (b. 1958)
- December 30
  - Julius Berman, 90, rabbi and attorney (b. 1935)
  - Ben Nighthorse Campbell, 92, politician, member of the U.S. Senate (1993–2005) and House of Representatives (1987–1993) (b. 1933)
  - Tim Kask, 76, editor and writer (b. 1949)
  - Mate Meštrović, 95, Croatian-born journalist, lobbyist and politician (b. 1930)
  - Tatiana Schlossberg, 35, journalist (The New York Times) (b. 1990)
  - Richard Smallwood, 77, gospel singer ("Total Praise") (b. 1948)
  - Jerry Welsh, 89, college basketball coach (SUNY Potsdam, Iona) (b. 1936)
  - Isiah Whitlock Jr., 71, actor (The Wire, Da 5 Bloods, Your Honor) (b. 1954)
- December 31
  - Harvey Pratt, 84, forensic and Native American artist (b. 1941) (death announced on this date)
