= 2025 deaths in the United States =

- Decades: 2000s; 2010s; 2020s; 2030s
- See also: History of the United States (2016–present); Timeline of United States history (2010–present); List of years in the United States

- 2025 deaths in the United States (January–March)
- 2025 deaths in the United States (April–June)
- 2025 deaths in the United States (July–September)
- 2025 deaths in the United States (October–December)
