= Richard P. Cueroni =

United States Coast Guard admiral (1930–2025)

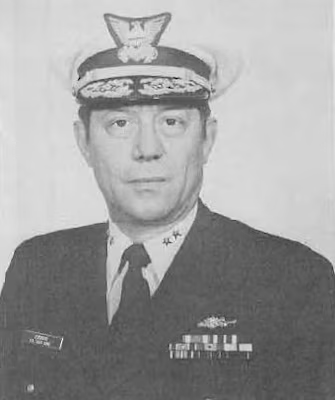
- Born: February 1, 1930; Framingham, Massachusetts, U.S.
- Died: October 13, 2025 (aged 95) Jacksonville Beach, Florida, U.S.
- Allegiance: United States
- Branch: United States Coast Guard
- Service years: 1953–1989
- Rank: Rear admiral
- Commands: Chief, Office of Personnel; Commandant of the United States Coast Guard Academy

Richard Paul Cueroni (February 1, 1930 – October 13, 2025) was a rear admiral in the United States Coast Guard. He served as Superintendent of the United States Coast Guard Academy from June 1986 to June 1989. Cueroni died on October 13, 2025, at the age of 95.
