= Amato Berardi =

Italian-American politician (1958–2025)

Amato Berardi (14 October 1958 – 12 December 2025) was an Italian-American politician and businessman.

== Life and career ==
Berardi was born on 14 October 1958 in Longano, Italy, and emigrated to the United States, to Philadelphia, at the age of 12. He was president of the National Italian American Political Action Committee.

In 1983, he founded Berardi & Associates Inc, operating in the social security and insurance sector, and was co-founder of the Italian-American Chamber of Commerce in Philadelphia.

He was elected to the Chamber of Deputies in 2008 in the North America constituency with the People of Freedom.

On 6 December 2019, in Campobasso, he was awarded the honor of Ambassador of Molise in the World.

Berardi died from a heart attack in Rome, on 12 December 2025, at the age of 67. At the time of his death, he suffered from kidney disease and was awaiting a transplant.
