= Karim Bitar =

American businessman (1965–2025)

Karim Bitar (February 11, 1965 – October 26, 2025) was an American businessman. He was the chief executive officer of Convatec from 2019 to 2025.

Born in New York City to middle eastern parents, he graduated from the University of Wisconsin and earned an MBA at the University of Michigan's Ross School of Business in 1992. He began his career as a McKinsey consultant and later worked for Lilly, before becoming the CEO of Genus plc, a company which specialized in animal genetics. He was a non-executive director of Spectris from 2017 to 2022. Bitar died from pancreatic cancer on October 26, 2025, at the age of 60.
