= Alison Rose (writer) =

American model and actress (1944–2025)

Alison Charles Rose (June 21, 1944 – September 2025) was an American model, actress and writer. In June 1985, she began work as a receptionist at The New Yorker and later became a writer for the magazine's Talk of the Town section. In 2004, she published the memoir Better than Sane: Tales from a Dangling Girl, which told of her life at The New Yorker, including numerous relationships with key writers, such as Harold Brodkey.

Later in her career, she became a contributor to Town & Country. Rose died at her home in Manhattan, in late September 2025, at the age of 81.
