= Thomas Rew =

United States Air Force general (1922–2025)

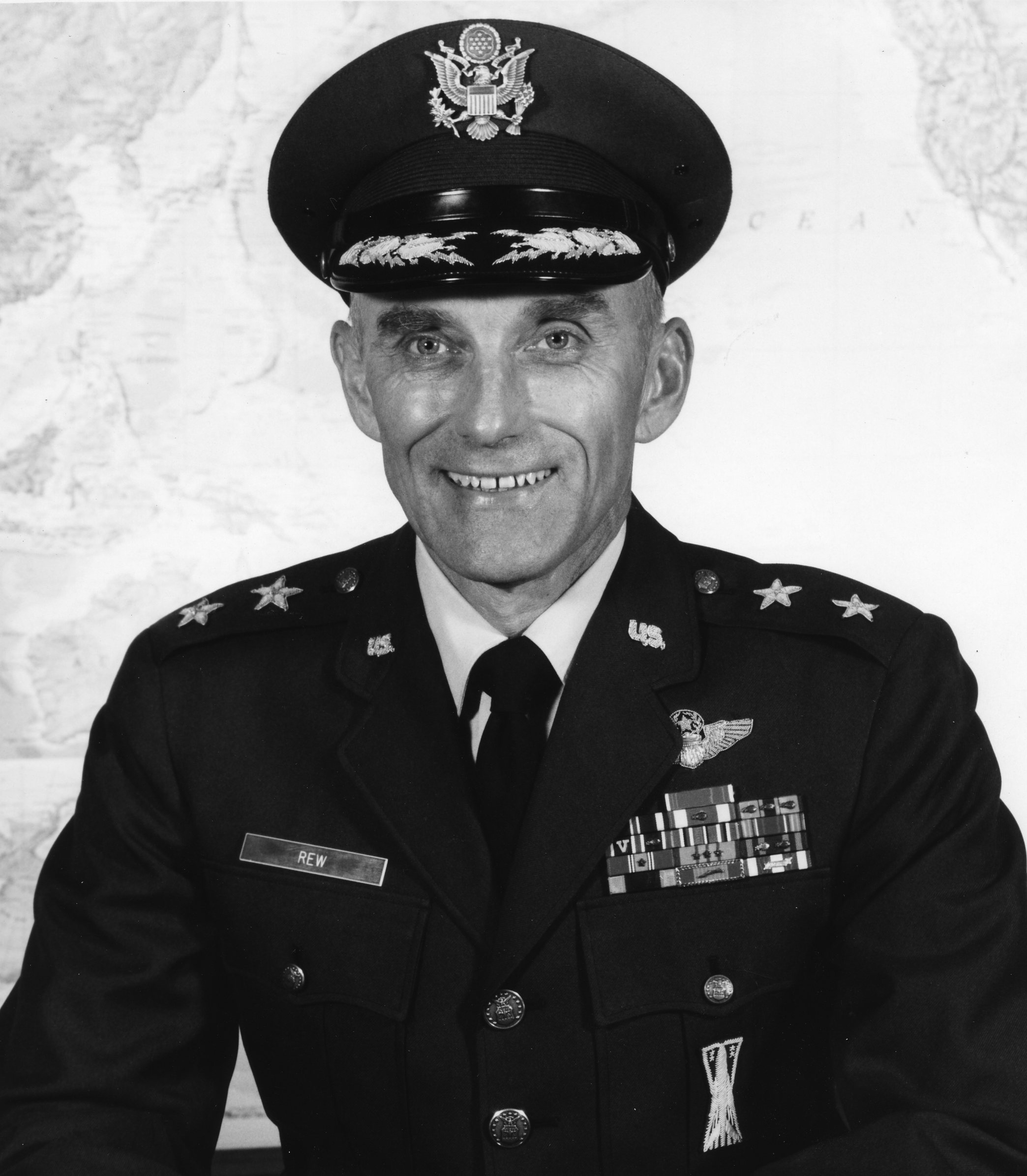
- Born: March 18, 1922; New York City, U.S.
- Died: October 12, 2025 (aged 103)
- Allegiance: United States
- Branch: United States Air Force
- Service years: 1940–1976
- Rank: Major general
- Commands: 3rd Air Division
- Conflicts: World War II

Thomas Frederick Rew (March 18, 1922 – October 12, 2025) was a major general in the United States Air Force who served as commander of the 3rd Air Division. He retired in 1976. He was born in Brooklyn, New York City on March 18, 1922, and died on October 12, 2025, at the age of 103.
