= Ann Lee (activist) =

American activist (1929–2025)

Ann Lee (September 9, 1929 – October 25, 2025) was an American activist from Houston, Texas who founded Republicans Against Marijuana Prohibition (RAMP), a conservative American group in favor of legalization of cannabis. She stated "prohibition is not conservative" and compared it to the unconstitutional Jim Crow laws of the American South. Lee was anti-abortion, voted for Donald Trump, and never smoked cannabis. Lee's group has been active at both in the state of Texas and at the federal level advocating legalization.

Lee died on October 25, 2025, at the age of 96.
