= Jay Stein =

American businessman (1937–2025)

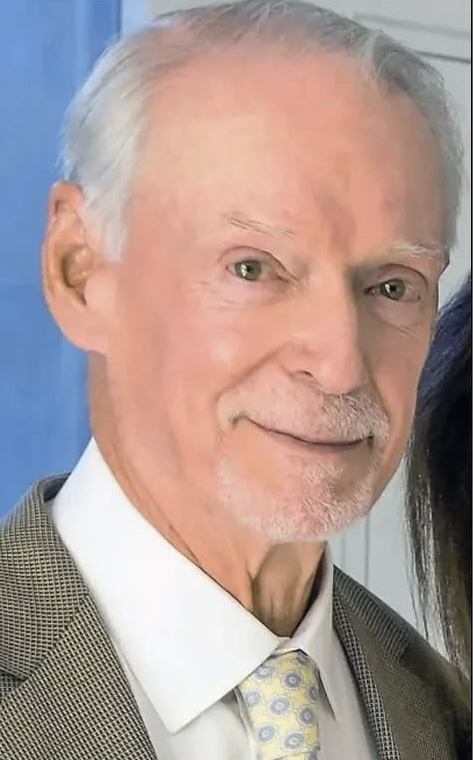
- Born: June 17, 1937
- Died: November 5, 2025 (aged 88)
- Occupation: Businessman

Jay Steven Stein (June 17, 1937 – November 5, 2025) was an American businessman who was the chairman and CEO of the MCA (Music Corporation of America) Recreation Services Group. He was responsible for expanding the Universal Studios Hollywood Tour, opening the Universal Amphitheatre, acquired the Yosemite Park and Curry Company and operated the concessions within Yosemite National Park, and founding the amusement park and resort complex Universal Studios Florida. Stein started in the mailroom at MCA in October 1959, and within six months moved into the Revue Studios Production Office. Stein was Assistant Studio Manager before being tapped to run the Tour in 1967 due to his relationships with the creative folks at the studio. When he took over, the Studio Tour consisted of two trams and a Quonset hut on Lankershim Blvd. Stein retired on January 6, 1993. He was inducted into the IAAPA Hall of Fame in 1999.

Stein died on November 5, 2025, at the age of 87.
