= Therrell C. Smith =

American ballet dancer (1917–2025)

Therrell C. Smith (November 5, 1917 – December 15, 2025) was an American ballet dancer and dance educator, best known for opening the Therrell C. Smith School of Dance in 1948. The school served the Black dance community at a time when other dance schools were closed to Black students due to segregation. The school has operated in Washington, D.C. for over 70 years.

Smith was honored with the Washington School of Ballet's Mary Day Award and recognized by the government of the District of Columbia.

== Early life and education ==
Smith was born and raised in Washington, D.C., and attended the Garnet-Patterson Junior High School and Dunbar High School. Her father, T.C. Smith, was a physician.

She began taking dance classes from Mabel Jones Freeman at 8 years old.

After studying sociology at Fisk University, she pursued ballet for five years at the Ballet Arts school at Carnegie Hall in New York City and studied under Russian ballerina Mathilde Kschessinska in Paris.

== Career ==
Upon her return to Washington, D.C., Smith was turned away from all major dance companies due to racial segregation. Soon after, she established the Therrell C. Smith School of Dance in Northeast D.C. with the goal of providing Black children with access to ballet education.

Her students included Virginia Johnson, who later became prima ballerina and artistic director at Theatre of Harlem.

== Death ==
Smith died on December 15, 2025, at the age of 108.
