= William Jenkins (veterinarian) =

South African-born veterinary scientist (1937–2025)

- Born: William Louis Jenkins; January 29, 1937; Johannesburg, Union of South Africa
- Died: November 26, 2025 (aged 88); Colleyville, Texas, U.S.
- Education: University of Pretoria; University of Missouri
- Children: 4

William Louis Jenkins (January 29, 1937 – November 26, 2025) was a South African-born veterinary scientist who served as the fourth President of the Louisiana State University System in the USA until his retirement in 2007. He delivered more than 200 lectures and addresses in the USA and internationally, wrote more than 60 scientific articles and is the co-author of a textbook on veterinary pharmacology.

== Life and career ==
Jenkins was born on a farm in South Africa. While Jenkins never intended to have a career in higher education, he did have an interest in veterinary medicine. Jenkins left South Africa for the United States, where he received a Ph.D. in veterinary medicine from the University of Missouri in Columbia in 1970.

Jenkins practiced veterinary medicine for four years before joining the Faculty at the University of Pretoria, where he became professor and head of the Department of Veterinary Physiology, Pharmacology and Toxicology.

A Veterinary Science graduate from the University of Pretoria, South Africa in 1958, Jenkins was awarded a Ph.D. from the University of Missouri in 1970. He delivered more than 200 lectures and addresses in the USA and internationally, wrote more than 60 scientific articles and is the co-author of a textbook on veterinary pharmacology.

After immigrating to the United States in 1978, Jenkins became a faculty member in the Department of Veterinary Physiology and Pharmacology at Texas A&M University. Jenkins was appointed Dean of the Louisiana State University’s (LSU) School of Veterinary Medicine in 1988 and was named Provost in 1993. Jenkins became Chancellor in 1996. He served as Chancellor at LSU for three years before his appointment as President of the LSU System, a nearly $3 billion enterprise that includes five academic campuses, a law centre, and 10 public hospitals.

Jenkins retired as the fourth President of the LSU System in 2007, and was later President Emeritus. Jenkins returned to LSU in 2012 to become interim President of the LSU System. Jenkins retired as interim President of the LSU System in 2013.

Jenkins died on November 26, 2025, at the age of 88.

== Awards and honours ==
As a teacher and administrator, Jenkins received numerous awards and accolades, including an honorary doctorate from the University of Pretoria (2000), the Volunteer of the Year Award by the Southern Economic Development Conference (2004), and the Sunshine Foundation Award in 2008 for his contribution to education in Louisiana.
