= George Bloom =

American television director and visual effects artist (1956–2025)

- Born: George Jay Bloom III; December 22, 1956; Evanston, Illinois, U.S.
- Died: November 11, 2025 (aged 68); Torrance, California, U.S.
- Education: Pepperdine University; Brooks Institute
- Occupations: Television director; Visual effects artist
- Spouse: Jennifer Bloom

George Jay Bloom III (December 22, 1956 – November 11, 2025) was an American television director and visual effects artist. He was nominated for a Primetime Emmy Award in the category Outstanding Emerging Media Program for his work on the television program Stranger Things. His nomination was shared with Craig Weiss and Jim Berndt.

Bloom died at the Providence Little Company of Mary Medical Center in Torrance, California, on November 11, 2025, at the age of 68.
