= Dwight Morrell Smith =

American academic (1931–2025)

Dwight Morrell Smith (October 10, 1931 – November 29, 2025) was an American academic who was a chemistry professor at the University of Denver (DU) from 1972 to 1989, and later an academic administrator of the university. In 1984, he was named the 15th chancellor of the university.

== Background ==
Smith was born in Hudson, New York, on October 10, 1931. He graduated from Central College in Pella, Iowa in 1953 with a degree in chemistry; He earned his Ph.D. from Pennsylvania State University in 1957. He was honored with a Sc.D. and Litt.D. from Central College in 1986 and the University of Denver in 1990. He married Alice Bond in 1955. Smith worked as a postdoctoral fellow and instructor at the California Institute of Technology from 1957 to 1959, senior chemist for Texaco Research Center in Beacon, New York, from 1959 to 1961, assistant professor of chemistry at Wesleyan University in Middletown, Connecticut, from 1961 to 1966, associate professor of Hope College in Holland, Michigan, from 1966 to 1969, and professor at the same college from 1969 to 1972. Smith also worked as a National Science Foundation Faculty Fellow at the Scripps Institution of Oceanography from 1971 to 1972 before joining the University of Denver as a chemistry professor and chair in 1972.

Smith died on November 29, 2025, at the age of 94.

== Career ==
From 1983 to 1984, Smith was the vice chancellor for academic affairs and in 1984 he became the 15th chancellor of the University. DU was in the midst of a budget crisis at the time and Smith reorganized the structure and changed the direction of the University’s programs, departments, and schools during his term of office. He replaced the College of Arts and Sciences with an undergraduate college and four faculties and started the core curriculum in tandem with a movement to create a coherent general education curriculum in universities nationwide. He played a major role in gaining funding for the Seeley G. Mudd Building (built in 1982), one of three principal buildings that houses the Departments of Chemistry and Biological Sciences. The University also acquired and established the first College of Systems Science.

== Scholarship ==
As a scholar his works included editing Revisions on Petroleum Chemistry, 1975–78, and editorial advisory board member, Recent Research Developments in Applied Spectroscopy beginning in 1998. He was a member of the American Association for the Advancement of Science, the American Association of Aerosol Research, the American Chemical Society and the Society for Applied Spectroscopy. Smith was also a member of the advisory board for the Solar Energy Research Institute (1989–1991), a member of the visiting committee of the Zettlemoyer Center for Surface Studies at Lehigh University (1990–1996), a member of the Science Advisory Board at Denver Research Institute at DU (1996–2006), and a senior adviser for the Rocky Mountain Center for Homeland Defense (2001–2007).

Smith left the University of Denver in 1990 to become the president of Hawaii Loa College, a position he held until 1992 when he returned to the University of Denver.
