= Charles W. Sydnor Jr. =

American historian (1943–2025)

Charles W. Sydnor Jr. (26 August 1943 – 28 November 2025) was an American historian of the Holocaust and World War II. He served as the Virginia Holocaust Museum’s Executive Director. His doctoral thesis, "Soldiers of Destruction: A History of the SS Death's Head Division, 1933-1945" was published in 1977 by Princeton University Press and in a second revised edition in 1990. Sydnor Jr. died on 28 November 2025, at the age of 82.
