= Steven Moss (American author) =

American author (1962–2025)

Steven Lewis Moss
- Born: December 24, 1962
- Died: October 23, 2025 (aged 62); Waco, Texas, U.S.
- Occupations: Educator; author; historian

Steven Moss (December 24, 1962 – October 23, 2025) was an American author and educator known for co-writing We Could Not Fail, a book covering the lives of the first ten black Americans who worked for NASA.

== Early life and education ==
Moss was educated at Texas Tech University, where he wrote his master's thesis on race issues concerning NASA.

== Career ==
Moss was an associate professor of English at Texas State Technical College.

Moss collaborated with Richard Paul, a radio producer who was working to document the lives of early black NASA employees, to write a book covering the lives of the first ten black engineers and scientists who had worked at NASA.
