= DeWitt S. Williams =

American temperance lobbyist (1939–2025)

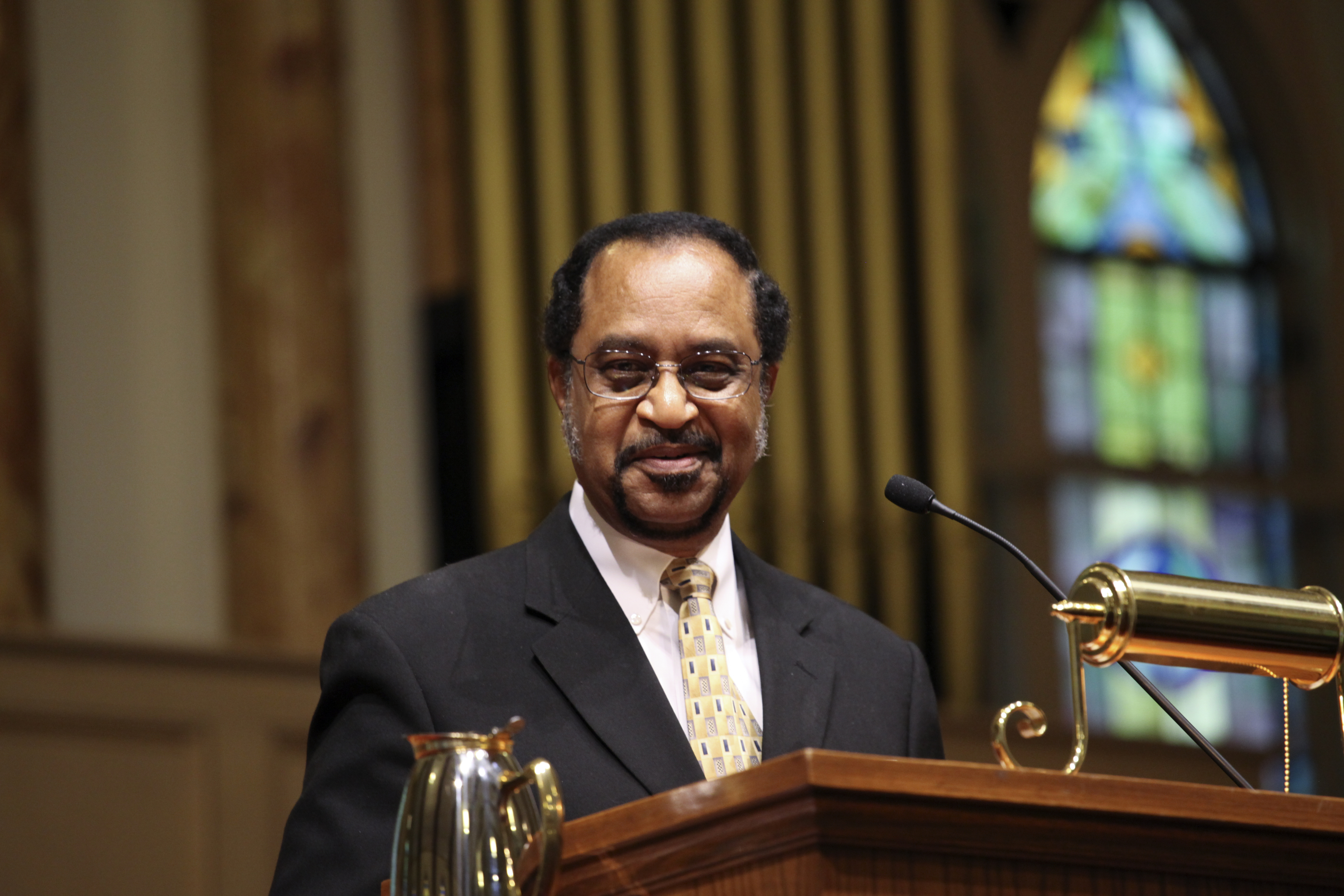
DeWitt Williams in 2011

DeWitt S. Williams (August 21, 1939 – November 17, 2025) was an American temperance lobbyist, author and Seventh-day Adventist administrator.

== Background ==
DeWitt S. Williams was born on August 21, 1939, in Philadelphia, Pennsylvania. He graduated from Oakwood University with a Bachelor's in theology in 1962, and that year married Margaret Norman. The couple have two daughters, Deitrice and Darnella.

Williams earned a master's degree in systematic theology from Andrews University. He was awarded a fellowship in African linguistics from Indiana University and received a doctorate in 1975 in education and linguistics. Later he obtained a Master's of public health from Loma Linda University.

Williams died on November 17, 2025, at the age of 86.

== Career ==
Williams began his career as a Seventh-day Adventist minister in Oklahoma City. From there, he completed a five-year term as a missionary in Kinshasa, Congo, as the president of the West Congo Field of Seventh-day Adventists, the first black to hold the position. Williams was the associate director of the Communication Department of the General Conference of Seventh-day Adventists from 1974 to 1979. From 1979-1982, he was president of the Central Africa Union of Seventh-day Adventists in Burundi.

In 1983, Williams was appointed the associate director of the General Conference Health and Temperance Department, holding that position until 1990. During this period Williams traveled to all 50 states and more than 110 countries promoting vegetarianism and holding stop-smoking seminars. From 1990 to 2010, Williams was the director of the Health and Temperance Department of the North American Division of Seventh-day Adventists.

During this period, Williams was critical in establishing clean air and health initiatives in his native Philadelphia, serving as a health adviser to Mayor John Street and Health Czar Gwen Foster. On June 22, 2009, Williams was invited to the White House to witness President Barack Obama sign the FDA omnibus regulation of tobacco, for which Williams had been lobbying.

== Scholarship ==
Williams authored or co-authored a dozen books, including the sole biography of Eva B. Dykes, the first black woman to complete the requirements for a PhD, and a biography on the current and former presidents of the General Conference of Seventh-day Adventists.

== Bibliography ==
Williams, DeWitt. She Fulfilled the Impossible Dream: The Story of Eva B. Dykes. Review and Herald Publishing Association, 1985.

Baker, Delbert and Williams, DeWitt, eds. Profiles of Service. Review and Herald Publishing Association, 1991.

Rizzo, Kay D. and Dewitt S. Williams, eds. For His Honor. Pacific Press Publishing Association, 1992.

Kuzma, Jan W., Kay Kuzma, and DeWitt S. Williams, eds. Energized. Review and Herald Publishing Association, 1997.

Kuzma, Jan W., Kay Kuzma, and DeWitt S. Williams. 60 Ways to Energize Your Life. Review and Herald Publishing Association, 1998.

Williams, DeWitt S., Kay Kuzma, and Leo R. Van Dolson. Ministries of Health and Healing: A Handbook for Health Leaders, Educators and Professionals in the North American Division. AdventSource, 2002.

Williams, DeWitt. Highly Committed: The Captivating Story of the Wilson Family and Their Impact on the Adventist Church. Teach Services, 2012.

Williams, DeWitt. Precious Memories of Missionaries of Color: A Compilation of Stories and Experiences of Ambassadors for God! Vol. 2. Teach Services, 2015.

Williams, DeWitt S. Spirit-Filled Leadership: Portraits of the Presidents, Secretaries and Treasurers of the General Conference of Seventh-day Adventists. Xulon Press, 2016.
