= 2025 in Brazil =

Events in the year 2025 in Brazil.

== Incumbents ==
=== Federal government ===
- President
  - Luiz Inácio Lula da Silva
- Vice President
  - Geraldo Alckmin
- President of the Chamber of Deputies
  - Arthur Lira (until 1 February)
  - Hugo Motta (from 1 February)
- President of the Federal Senate
  - Rodrigo Pacheco (until 1 February)
  - Davi Alcolumbre (from 1 February)
- President of the Supreme Federal Court
  - Luís Roberto Barroso

== Events ==
=== January ===
- January 6 – At the 82nd Golden Globe Awards, Fernanda Torres becomes the first Brazilian actress to win the award for Best Actress in a Motion Picture - Drama.
- January 10 – Two members of the Landless Workers Movement are killed in an attack in Tremembé, São Paulo State.
- January 12 – Ten people are reported killed in landslides caused by heavy rains across Minas Gerais, including nine in Ipatinga.
- January 13 – A law restricting the usage of smartphones in schools nationwide comes into effect.
- January 17 – Six suspected bank robbers are killed in a police raid on a ranch in Ponta Grossa, Parana State.

=== February ===
- February 7 – A Beechcraft King Air aircraft crashes into a bus in the Barra Funda district of São Paulo, killing two people.
- February 12 – A fire guts a factory in Rio de Janeiro producing costumes for the Rio Carnival, injuring 21 people.
- February 15 – A light aircraft crashes in Quadra, São Paulo, killing two people.
- February 19 – Brazilian investigation into Elon Musk: Supreme Federal Court justice Alexandre de Moraes imposes a fine of 8.1 million Brazilian reais ($1.4 million) on X for refusing to provide registration data for a profile attributed to an ally of former president Jair Bolsonaro accused of spreading disinformation.
- February 20 – A bus carrying students of the University of Franca collides with a truck near Nuporanga, São Paulo, killing 12 people and injuring 21 others.
- February 21 – Supreme Federal Court justice Alexandre de Moraes orders the suspension of Rumble for refusing to remove the account of an ally of former president Jair Bolsonaro accused of spreading disinformation and failing to name a legal representative in Brazil.

=== March ===
- March 2 – I'm Still Here, directed by Walter Salles, becomes the first Brazilian film to win at the Academy Awards after being recognized as Best International Feature Film.
- March 6 – School closures are implemented in parts of Rio Grande do Sul due to a heatwave.
- March 10 – Four people are killed in a fire at a homeless shelter in Sao Jose dos Campos.
- March 11 – The National Civil Aviation Agency of Brazil suspends the operating license of Voepass over the crash of Voepass Flight 2283 in 2024.
- March 15 – Aleson Cristiano de Oliveira Fonseca and Fabio Pirineus da Silva are sentenced to up to 23 years' imprisonment over the murder of Moïse Mugenyi Kabagambe in 2022.
- March 22–30 – 2025 Copa América de Futsal Femenina
- March 24 – The federal government issues an apology over the discovery in 1990 of a mass grave in the Cemitério de Perus in which people killed during the Brazilian military dictatorship were secretly buried.
- March 26 – The Supreme Federal Court orders former president Jair Bolsonaro and seven of his associates to stand trial over the 2022 Brazilian coup plot.
- March 31 – The Brazilian government admits that the Brazilian Intelligence Agency had conducted espionage on Paraguayan officials during the presidency of Jair Bolsonaro.

=== April ===
- April 4 – A bus carrying students and faculty of the Federal University of Santa Maria crashes in Imigrante, Rio Grande do Sul, killing seven people.
- April 8 –
  - A bus overturns in Araguari, Minas Gerais, killing 11 people.
  - Juscelino Filho resigns as communications minister after charges of corruption are filed against him over the misuse of public funds in a road paving project when he was a federal deputy for Maranhão.
- April 25 – Former president Fernando Collor de Mello is arrested in Alagoas after his conviction for corruption as part of Operation Car Wash is upheld by Supreme Federal Court justice Alexandre de Moraes.
- April 28 – Supreme Federal Court justice Flávio Dino orders the federal government to seize property from private individuals found to be responsible for illegal deforestation and wildfires, and orders an end to the legalization of ownership of illegally-acquired land.

=== May ===
- May 2 – Carlos Lupi resigns as social security minister after a police investigation reveals long-term embezzlement of pension funds by the Instituto Nacional do Seguro Social.
- May 4 – Police announce the arrest of two people on suspicion of plotting a bomb attack on a concert by Lady Gaga at Copacabana Beach in Rio de Janeiro the previous day.
- May 15 – A court in Rio de Janeiro dismisses Ednaldo Rodrigues as president of the Brazilian Football Confederation, citing "possible forgery" in his employment contract.
- May 16 –
  - The first case of avian influenza in a commercial farm in Brazil is discovered in Rio Grande do Sul.
  - Marcos Roberto de Almeida, a leader of the Primeiro Comando da Capital, is arrested in Bolivia.
- May 28 – Azul Brazilian Airlines files for Chapter 11 bankruptcy in the United States.

=== June ===
- June 3 – President Lula signs a law increasing the quota for government jobs reserved for Afro-Brazilians from 20% to 30% and adding Indigenous people and descendants of enslaved people as beneficiaries.
- 10 June – Brazil qualifies for the 2026 FIFA World Cup after defeating Paraguay 1-0 at the 2026 FIFA World Cup qualification in São Paulo.
- 18 June – Two people are killed following heavy rains in Rio Grande do Sul.
- 21 June – 2025 Santa Catarina hot air balloon crash: A hot-air balloon crashes after caught fire in Praia Grande, Santa Catarina, killing eight of the 21 people on board.
- 25 June – Congress nullifies a decree by President Lula to raise a financial transactions tax, the first time the legislature has struck down a presidential decree since 1992.
- 26 June – The federal government formally admits responsibility for the death of journalist and dissident Vladimir Herzog in custody during the military dictatorship in 1975.

=== July ===
- July 3 – A cyberattack is made on the software company C&M, which affects the instant payment system Pix and results in the theft of more than 540 million reais ($100 million).
- 6–7 July – 17th BRICS summit in Rio de Janeiro.
- 8 July – A child is killed and two others are injured in a mass stabbing attack at a school in Estação, Rio Grande do Sul.
- 13 July – The Cavernas do Peruaçu National Park is designated as a World Heritage Site by UNESCO.
- 18 July – Political ineligibility of Jair Bolsonaro: The Supreme Federal Court places former president Bolsonaro on nightly house arrest and orders him to wear an electronic ankle bracelet. They also forbid him from approaching embassies, foreign ambassadors, and diplomats.
- 24 July – Brazil officially confirms it will join South Africa's genocide case against Israel at the International Court of Justice.
- 30 July –
  - The United States imposes a 50% tariff on Brazilian exports and sanctions Supreme Federal Court justice Alexandre de Moraes on charges of suppressing freedom of expression and authorizing "arbitrary pre-trial detentions".
  - Two Embraer A29 Super Tucanos of the Brazilian Air Force collide mid-air over Porto Ferreira, São Paulo. One of the planes crashes, with its pilot safely ejecting, while the other lands without incident.

=== August ===
- 8 August –
  - President Lula partially vetoes a bill that would have reduced federal authority in issuing project licenses and fast-tracked projects in the Amazon Basin. The vetoes are mostly overturned by Congress on 27 November.
  - Four people are arrested in police raids in Vila Kennedy, Rio de Janeiro against an illegal ride-hailing app operated by Comando Vermelho.
  - A bus and a truck collide near Lucas do Rio Verde, Mato Grosso, killing 11 people and injuring 45 others.
- 12 August – Nine people are killed in an explosion at an explosives factory in Curitiba.
- 15 August – Influencer Hytalo Santos is arrested in Carapicuíba, São Paulo, on charges of human trafficking and child sexual exploitation in content produced for social media.
- 18 August– The Supreme Federal Court rules that foreign court decisions are only enforceable in Brazil "upon approval or in compliance with international judicial cooperation mechanisms" amid sanctions imposed by the United States.

=== September ===
- 4 September – Eight members of the Terceiro Comando Puro are killed in a shootout with police in Rio de Janeiro.
- 11 September – The Supreme Federal Court convicts former president Jair Bolsonaro of instigating the 2022 Brazilian coup plot and sentences him to 27 years' imprisonment.
- 15 September – The former São Paulo Civil Police chief Ruy Ferraz Fontes, the first to investigate the activities of the Primeiro Comando da Capital, is murdered in Praia Grande.
- 16 September –
  - Brazil, as a member of Mercosur, signs a free trade agreement with Iceland, Liechtenstein, Norway and Switzerland.
  - Forty-five people are arrested, while 700 animals are rescued nationwide in the largest police operation against wildlife trafficking in the country.
  - A court in the United States dismisses a lawsuit filed by the Marúbo people residing in the Vale do Javari against The New York Times and TMZ accusing the media outlets of smearing them over their first usage of the Internet, saying that their reporting was covered by free speech.
- 19 September – Brazil officially joins South Africa's genocide case against Israel at the International Court of Justice.
- 20 September – The last fluent speaker and partial namesake of the Aurê–Aurá language dies at the age of 77, marking the definitive extinction of the language.
- 22 September – The United States imposes sanctions on Judge Alexandre de Moraes' wife, Viviane Barci de Moraes, over the prosecution of Jair Bolsonaro.
- 23 September – 2025 Aquidauana Cessna 175 crash: A light aircraft crashes in Aquidauana, Mato Grosso do Sul, killing, four people including Chinese architect Kongjian Yu.
- 24 September – The Federal Senate votes down a bill that would have expanded criminal immunity for lawmakers following massive protests nationwide.
- 25 September – Two teenagers are killed in a shooting outside a school in Sobral, Ceará.

=== October ===
- 3 October – At least one person is reported to have died while 11 others fall ill nationwide after consuming cocktails made from bootleg alcohol.
- 9 October – Luís Roberto Barroso voluntarily retires from the Supreme Federal Court, eight years before the mandatory retirement age of 75.
- 14 October - Brazilian blackout that affected all 26 states of Brazil
- 17 October – A bus overturns on a highway in Saloá, Pernambuco, killing 17 people.
- 20 October – The federal government allows Petrobras to conduct exploratory drilling for petroleum in the Equatorial Margin deposit off the coast of Amapá near the Amazon Delta.
- 23 October – The remaining seven defendants in the CR Flamengo training ground fire in 2019 are acquitted by a court in Rio de Janeiro State.
- 28 October – Operation Containment: At least 132 people are killed in police raids on favelas controlled by the Comando Vermelho in Rio de Janeiro.

=== November ===
- 7 November – Tornadoes hit Rio Bonito do Iguaçu and Guarapuava in Paraná, killing six people and injuring more than 750 others.
- 10–21 November – 2025 United Nations Climate Change Conference in Belém.
- 10 November – A court declares telecommunications company Oi bankrupt, the largest bankruptcy in Brazil's history.
- 16 November – Lucas Pinheiro Braathen becomes the first Brazilian to win an FIS Alpine Ski World Cup event after winning the men's slalom event at the Levi Black course in Finland.
- 18 November –
  - The Supreme Federal Court convicts nine senior military and police officers over a plot to assassinate President Lula, Vice President Geraldo Alckmin and Supreme Court Justice Alexandre de Moraes and sentences them to up to 24 years' imprisonment.
  - The Central Bank of Brazil closes down the Banco Master bank following the discovery of a fraudulent scheme involving 12-billion reais ($2 billion).
- 20 November –
  - President Lula appoints Solicitor General Jorge Messias to the Supreme Federal Court, replacing Luís Roberto Barroso.
  - Thirteen people are injured in a fire at a pavilion being used for the 2025 United Nations Climate Change Conference in Belém.
- 22 November – Jair Bolsonaro is arrested after being deemed a flight risk by the Supreme Federal Court for tampering with his ankle monitor while under house arrest.
- 26 November – President Lula signs a law exempting individuals earning up to 5,000 reais ($940) a month from income taxes, establishing tax discounts for incomes up to 7,350 reais ($1400), and imposing a minimum effective tax rate for high-income individuals.

=== December ===
- 7 December –
  - Brazil wins the inaugural edition of the FIFA Futsal Women's World Cup held in the Philippines after defeating Portugal 1–0 in the final.
  - Eight engravings by Henri Matisse and five works of Candido Portinari are stolen following a heist at the Mário de Andrade Library in São Paulo.
- 8 December – President Lula signs a law allowing judges to impose severe restrictions against domestic abusers including withdrawal of gun ownership, eviction from the victim’s home and banning contact with the victim, and the imposition of ankle monitors for abusers.
- 10 December – A major blackout caused by fallen trees from an extratropical cyclone hits São Paulo.
- 12 December – The United States lifts the sanctions it had imposed against Alexandre de Moraes and his wife in July.
- 17 December – The Supreme Federal Court rules that Indigenous land rights constitute unamendable constitutional guarantees, thereby blocking congressional efforts to restrict the recognition of Indigenous territories and reinforcing existing protections despite pending legislative opposition.
- 18 December – Eduardo Bolsonaro and Alexandre Ramagem are removed as members of the Chamber of Deputies by speaker Hugo Motta, citing Bolsonaro's chronic absences and a previous order by the Supreme Federal Court to remove Ramagem.
- 26 December – Silvinei Vasques, a former commander of the Federal Highway Police wanted for evading his conviction on charges of involvement in the 8 January Brasília attacks in 2023, is arrested in Paraguay and extradited to Brazil.
- 27 December
  - A Cessna 170A owned by an advertising company crashes off Copacabana Beach in Rio de Janeiro, killing the pilot.
  - Eleven people are killed in an accident involving two cars on the BR-101 near Mucuri, Bahia.

== Art and entertainment ==
- List of 2025 box office number-one films in Brazil
- List of Brazilian submissions for the Academy Award for Best International Feature Film

== Holidays ==
- 1 January – New Year's Day
- 3–4 March – Carnival
- 18 April – Good Friday
- 21 April – Tiradentes's Day
- 1 May – Labour Day
- 19 June – Feast of Corpus Christi
- 7 September – Independence Day
- 12 October – Our Lady of Aparecida
- 2 November – All Souls' Day
- 15 November – Republic Day
- 20 November – Black Consciousness Day
- 25 December – Christmas Day

== Deaths ==
=== January ===
- 14 January – Benedito de Lira, 82, federal deputy (1995–1999, 2003–2019) and mayor of Barra de São Miguel, Alagoas (since 2021).

=== February ===
- 14 February – Carlos Diegues, 84, film director (Ganga Zumba, Bye Bye Brasil, Deus é Brasileiro).

=== April ===
- 20 April – Cristina Buarque, 74, singer and composer.
- 30 April – Inah Canabarro Lucas, 116, nun and supercentenarian, world's oldest verified living person

=== May ===
- 23 May – Sebastião Salgado, 81, photographer and environmentalist.

=== June ===
- 4 June – Niède Guidon, 92, archaeologist

=== July ===
- 20 July – Mario Pirata, 67, writer

=== August ===
- 2 August – Ariovaldo Umbelino de Oliveira, 78, geographer.
- 7 August – Rosa Gauditano, 70, journalist and photographer.
- 17 August – Marcelo Bianconi, 69, Brazilian journalist.
- 22 August –
  - Vidal Balielo, 80, journalist (RPC).
  - Miguel Proença, 86, classical pianist.
- 26 August – Mestre Damasceno, 71, Carimbó singer and cultural director.

=== September ===
- 13 September – Hermeto Pascoal, 89, jazz musician.
- 28 September – Airton Garcia, 75, politician and entrepreneur.

=== October ===
- 25 October – José Moreira de Melo, 84, Roman Catholic prelate, bishop of Itapeva (1996–2016).

=== November ===
- 2 November – Lô Borges, 73, singer-songwriter and guitarist (Clube da Esquina).
- 3 November – Clara Charf, 100, political activist (Brazilian Communist Party, Workers' Party).
- 6 November – Paulo Frateschi, 75, politician, state deputy and chairman of the Workers' Party.
- 11 November –
  - João Chagas Leite, 80, gaúcho singer.
  - João Casimiro Wilk, 74, Roman Catholic prelate, bishop of Formosa (1998–2004) and of Anápolis (since 2004).
- 24 November – Ione Borges, 73, television presenter (TV Gazeta).
- 25 November – José Afonso da Silva, 100, jurist.

=== December ===
- 1 December – Osvaldo Giuntini, 89, Roman Catholic prelate, auxiliary bishop (1982–1987), coadjutor bishop (1987–1992) and bishop of Marília (1992–2013).
- 12 December – Sergio Miceli, 80, sociologist.
- 13 December – Haroldo Costa, 95, actor (A Moreninha, Kananga do Japão, Você Decide).
- 20 December – Lindomar Castilho, 85, singer and convicted murderer.
- 22 December – Iêda Maria Vargas, 80, actress and beauty queen, Miss Universe 1963.

== See also ==
- Mercosur
- Organization of American States
- Organization of Ibero-American States
- Community of Portuguese Language Countries
