= Inês Brasil =

Musical artist (born 1969)

Inês Brasil !!
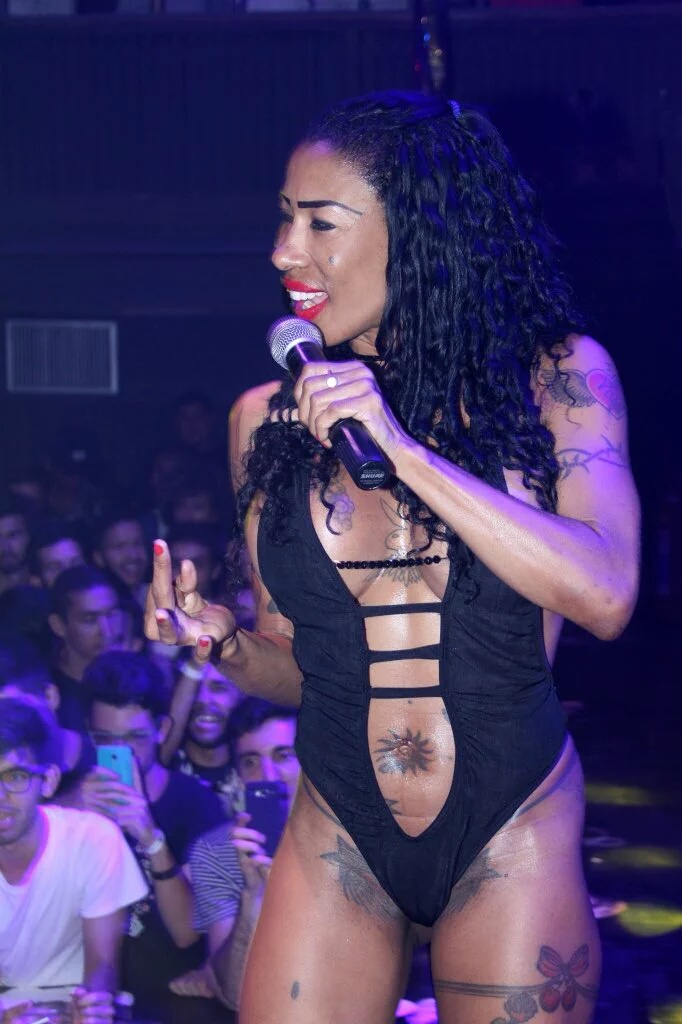
- Brasil in 2016
- Born: Inês Tânia Lima da Silva; October 25, 1969 (age 57); Rio de Janeiro, Brazil
- Citizenship: Brazil; Germany
- Occupations: Singer; songwriter; dancer
- Years active: 1991–present
- Spouse: Christian Karp (divorced)
- Children: 2
- Musical career
- Genres: Samba; Funk carioca; MPB
- Instruments: Vocals
- Label: Independent
- Website: inesbrasil.tv

Inês Tânia Lima da Silva (born October 25, 1969), known professionally as Inês Brasil (Brazilian Portuguese pronunciation: [iˈnejz bɾaˈziw]), is a Brazilian singer, dancer and internet celebrity. She became famous in Brazil in late 2012 after publishing an audition video for the 2013 edition of Big Brother Brasil on YouTube, which became popular. Since then, most of the videos she publishes on social media have become popular.

In 2015, she released her first studio album, Make Love, which contains original songs, as well as covers of classic MPB songs. Currently, she travels all across Brazil for concerts in clubs, performing around 20 concerts a month.

== Biography ==
Inês Tânia Lima da Silva was born in Rio de Janeiro. She has eight siblings and two daughters, Monique Lima Karp and Júlia Lima Karp. Monique is also her manager. In the 1990s, she reportedly began engaging in prostitution at the age of 21, at her mother's direction because of her behavior. (Note: Although she began working as a prostitute at the age of 21, Inês stated that, when she was 15, she had sexual relations with older men in exchange for money.) During this time she met her ex-husband Christian Karp, who took her to live in Germany. Their marriage lasted ten years. She lived in Germany for eighteen years, before returning to Brazil. Inês speaks German and became a naturalized German citizen.

== Career ==
=== Early years ===
Inês began her career in entertainment at the age of 18 at night club "Oba-Oba", as one of the "Mulatas". Her father was a singer and composer at the Quilombo dos Palmares samba school. Along with her mother and eight brothers, she had a particularly religious childhood. She sang for the first time in church, and at age 22, she became a samba teacher at a school in Rio de Janeiro. It was there that she met her ex-husband Christian Karp, who would then take her to Europe. He also helped her with her singing career that began at age 27. Karp, a director and photographer for a German television network, produced Inês’ videos and introduced her to bossa-nova.

=== 2012–2015: Fame and Make Love ===
A friend of Inês suggested that she make an audition video for the TV Globo reality show Big Brother Brasil. Inês agreed and sent videos for five years, from the show's 2009 season to its 2013 season. Her December 2012 audition video went viral, launching her into fame.

From then on, she made several parody videos, including a remix of the song "Scream & Shout" by singer Will.i.am and Britney Spears, with Inês’ own verses added to the track. The remix was not made official but has garnered many views on YouTube, which encouraged other people to make new parodies. Soon after, numerous other parody remixes of tracks by artists including Lady Gaga, Miley Cyrus, Nicki Minaj, DJ Snake and Rihanna, appeared online. Inês used these remixes in her shows. Since then, Inês has appeared in Brazilian television programs such as TV Fama, Superpop, and Agora É Tarde. She was also the target of a prank on the show Domingo Legal, at the request of Monique Karp, one of her two daughters.

On March 17, 2015, Inês launched her first studio album, Make Love, on iTunes and Google Play, as well as on music streaming platforms Spotify, Apple Music, and Tidal. The music video for Make Love, the first track on the album, surpassed 5 million views on YouTube. On December 1, 2015, when the Grammy Awards official Facebook page made a post asking the public who should be nominated, Inês’ fans flooded the comments section with the sentence in English: “Inês Brasil best be nominated”. The mobilization of her fans online led to the organization blocking internet traffic from Brazil to the website used to vote for potential nominees.

=== 2017–present ===
In 2017, Inês participated in a promotional video for the release of the Netflix original series Orange Is the New Black, in which she speaks to protagonist Piper Chapman. She was also present in a similar video for the series.

== Personal life ==
The youngest daughter of nine in a humble, evangelical family, Inês was born and raised in Subúrbio Carioca, a suburb of Rio de Janeiro in the Vila Kennedy neighborhood. At the age of 18 she decided to leave home and live alone in a rented studio apartment in Copacabana in search of financial and personal independence. During this period, she worked as a dancer in the Rubem Braga show house as a Mulata. After a few years, she returned to Rio and became a samba teacher. While teaching she also began to work in prostitution as a way to supplement her income. The pay as a teacher was low, and she needed money to support her parents who were struggling financially while also raising Inês’ two daughters, Monique and Júlia, who she had by two past relationships.

Eventually, Inês ended up living in Germany, where she would reside for eighteen years, ten of which was spent with her ex-husband who took her out of prostitution while she was still living in Rio. In interviews, Inês has revealed that she made up to four thousand reais a week (around 800 USD) and started using cocaine. But everything changed when she met her ex-husband who helped free her from her addiction and the life of a showgirl.

After ten years of marriage, they divorced, but Inês remained in Germany and went back to prostitution to support herself and her two daughters, who came to live with her in Germany after the divorce, where Inês tried to give them a better life. After eight years as a luxury showgirl in Munich, she decided to return to Brazil to be closer to her parents, and little by little, she managed to abandon prostitution to post videos on YouTube where she sang and danced, attracting a large fanbase and reaching stardom. She was able to reveal her artistic side and also focus on comedy.

Her two daughters are Monique Lima, who is also Inês’ manager, and Julia Lima, a model.

== Controversies ==
=== Sabrina Boing Boing ===
In 2013, Inês got involved in a dispute with Brazilian DJ, singer, and dancer Sabrina Boing Boing. They consequently argued over reporting of their dispute. On her YouTube channel, Inês publicly criticized the model's attitude. Confusion arose when – according to Inês in an interview with TV Fama – Inês was taking topless pictures with her fans when Sabrina suggested she push her breasts together and Inês refused.

=== Alleged Assault ===
On the day of February 20, 2015, a video of Inês being allegedly physically assaulted by her then manager and advisor Thiago Araújo went public. The fight would have taken place in the early hours of Wednesday the 18th at the Espaço Acústica concert hall in Rio de Janeiro, where Inês had performed and Thiago, also a DJ, had played. When questioned by EGO, an online Brazilian tabloid, Thiago confirmed the dispute and said that Inês was going too far by streaking on stage and that, as her manager, he was called by the management of the concert hall and some friends to contain her. He said that there was no aggression on his part and that he was simply trying to get Inês off the stage so she wouldn't take her clothes off, as she often does. Despite having minimized the rumors of assault, Thiago confirmed that in the heat of the moment, Inês Brasil was at a police station to receive a physical exam and file assault charges against him.

Inês made a statement claiming she had gotten worked up in the video as a result of having had a few too many drinks and that the situation appeared more dramatic than it really was. She also said that she was not assaulted, that Thiago simply pulled her by the arm and that there was a discussion between them. Inês ended her video statement by saying that Thiago had apologized for the way he tried to get her off stage, that everything had already been worked out between them, and thanked her fans for their concern on the internet.

=== Intimate Video ===
In May 2015, Inês Brasil was involved in a scandal in which a video of her having sex with a guy named Diego was leaked. The singer said she had no involvement in leaking the video. Diego had asked to record them having sex but said he would not release it. However, the video was released. Diego said that he had lost his cell phone and that he would not have released the video by his own doing.

== Discography ==
Studio albums2015: Make Love

Singles

- 2002: "Copa do Mundo"
- 2002: "Oba Oba Oba"
- 2015: "Make Love"
- 2016: "Undererê"
- 2017: "Adão e Eva, Eva e Adão"

Music videos

Year	Work
2002	"Oba Oba Oba"
2002	"Copa do Mundo"
2015	"Make Love"
2016	"Undererê"

== Filmography ==
Television
Ano	Show	Role	Note
2013	Superpop	Herself	Guest star
2013	Agora é Tarde	Herself	Guest star
2013	Domingo Legal	Herself	Telegrama Legal contestant
2015	The Noite	Herself	Guest star
2016	Promotional video for the 4th season of Orange Is The New Black	Herself	Guest star
2017	The Noite	Herself	Guest star
