= List of 2023 box office number-one films in Brazil =

This is a list of films which placed number one at the weekend box office in Brazil for the year 2023.

== Number-one films ==
No.	Date	Film	Gross (USD)	Ref
1	January 8, 2023	Avatar: The Way of Water	$5,032,853	
2	January 15, 2023	Avatar: The Way of Water	$3,009,086	
3	January 22, 2023	Avatar: The Way of Water	$1,797,508	
4	January 29, 2023	Puss in Boots: The Last Wish	$1,214,161	
5	February 5, 2023	Puss in Boots: The Last Wish	$962,562	
6	February 12, 2023	Puss in Boots: The Last Wish	$1,259,165	
7	February 19, 2023	Ant-Man and the Wasp: Quantumania	$3,855,076	
8	February 26, 2023	Ant-Man and the Wasp: Quantumania	$1,713,382	
9	March 5, 2023	Creed III	$1,100,000	
10	March 12, 2023	Scream VI	$2,183,656	
11	March 19, 2023	Shazam! Fury of the Gods	$1,500,000	
12	March 26, 2023	John Wick: Chapter 4	$3,006,773	
13	April 2, 2023	John Wick: Chapter 4	$1,821,637	
14	April 9, 2023	The Super Mario Bros. Movie	$6,152,113	
15	April 16, 2023	The Super Mario Bros. Movie	$4,342,280	
16	April 23, 2023	The Super Mario Bros. Movie	$4,208,261	
17	April 30, 2023	The Super Mario Bros. Movie	$2,324,484	
18	May 7, 2023	Guardians of the Galaxy Vol. 3	$6,745,615	
19	May 14, 2023	Guardians of the Galaxy Vol. 3	$3,794,738	
20	May 21, 2023	Fast & Furious X	$8,944,331	
21	May 28, 2023	Fast & Furious X	$4,404,951.17	
22	June 4, 2023	Spider-Man: Across the Spider-Verse	$3,343,758.38	
23	June 11, 2023	Spider-Man: Across the Spider-Verse	$3,349,765.14	
24	June 18, 2023	The Flash	$3,400,000	
25	June 25, 2023	Elemental	$1,594,440	
26	July 2, 2023	Elemental	$1,777,962	
27	July 9, 2023	Elemental	$1,912,153	
28	July 16, 2023	Mission: Impossible – Dead Reckoning Part One	$3,500,000	
29	July 23, 2023	Barbie	$17,600,000	
30	July 30, 2023	Barbie	$7,800,000	
31	August 6, 2023	Barbie	$3,203,600.85	
32	August 13, 2023	Barbie	$1,281,440.34	
33	August 20, 2023	Blue Beetle	$2,200,000	
34	August 27, 2023	Blue Beetle	$1,400,000	
35	September 3, 2023	Blue Beetle	$853,432.28	
36	September 10, 2023	The Nun II	$4,400,000	
37	September 17, 2023	The Nun II	$1,800,000	
38	September 24, 2023	Sound of Freedom	$1,155,298.56	
39	October 1, 2023	Sound of Freedom	$1,350,649.35	
40	October 8, 2023	Sound of Freedom	$1,512,059.37	
41	October 15, 2023	PAW Patrol: The Mighty Movie	$1,613,813.93	
42	October 22, 2023	Trolls Band Together	$883,017	
43	October 29, 2023	Five Nights at Freddy's	$4,103,084	
44	November 5, 2023	Five Nights at Freddy's	$2,604,478	
45	November 12, 2023	The Marvels	$1,856,343	
46	November 19, 2023	The Hunger Games: The Ballad of Songbirds & Snakes	$3,173,493	
47	November 26, 2023	Napoleon	$1,200,000	
48	December 3, 2023	Napoleon	$879,406.31	
49	December 10, 2023	Wonka	$2,062,318.05	
50	December 17, 2023	Wonka	$4,800,000	
51	December 24, 2023	Aquaman and the Lost Kingdom	$2,322,610.61	
52	December 31, 2023	Aquaman and the Lost Kingdom	$6,800,000	

== Highest-grossing films ==
Highest-grossing films of 2023
Rank	Title	Distributor	Gross R$	Gross US$
1.	Barbie	Warner Bros.	$207,183,780	$38,438,549.17
2.	Fast X	Universal	$133,934,493	$26,817,040.95
3.	The Super Mario Bros. Movie	Universal	$133,245,439	$26,679,075.08
4.	Guardians of the Galaxy Vol. 3	Disney	$90,208,287	$18,061,959.04
5.	Puss in Boots: The Last Wish	Universal	$88,239,322	$17,667,722.92
6.	The Little Mermaid	Disney	$84,362,774	$16,891,540.89
7.	Aquaman and the Lost Kingdom	Warner Bros.	$80,401,723	$16,098,439.25
8.	Elemental	Disney	$77,049,677	$15,427,275.66
9.	Oppenheimer	Universal	$66,571,860	$13,329,354.19
10.	Spider-Man: Across the Spider-Verse	Sony	$57,635,308	$11,540,032.6

== See also ==
- List of Brazilian films — Brazilian films by year
- 2023 in Brazil

Preceded by 2022	Box office number-one films of Brazil; 2023	Succeeded by 2024
