= João Chagas Leite =

Brazilian singer (1945–2025)

João Chagas Leite (August 22, 1945 – November 11, 2025) was a Brazilian gaúcho singer.

== Life and career ==
Leite was born in Uruguaiana, Rio Grande do Sul on August 22, 1945. He began his career in the late 1960s and gained prominence when he participated in California da Canção Nativa, in Uruguaiana. He blended, milonga, vaneira and other frontier rhythms. Throughout a career lasting five decades, he became a renowned interpreter of native music, winning numerous awards in native music festivals.

He performed at the Latin America Memorial, in São Paulo, as well as internationally in Uruguay and Argentina.

Due to a physical disability in his left hand, Leite had to play the guitar in an inverted way until he learned to adapt.

Leite died on November 11, 2025, at the age of 80, after suffering from colorectal cancer.
