= List of 2021 box office number-one films in Brazil =

This is a list of films which placed number-one at the weekend box office in Brazil during 2021.

== Number-one films ==
†	This implies the highest-grossing movie of the year.

#	Weekend end date	Film	Box office
1	January 3, 2021	Wonder Woman 1984	US$400,501
2	January 10, 2021	Wonder Woman 1984	US$610,645
3	January 17, 2021	Wonder Woman 1984	US$375,528
4	January 24, 2021	Wonder Woman 1984	US$250,434
5	January 31, 2021	Wonder Woman 1984	US$141,025
6	February 7, 2021	Wonder Woman 1984	US$174,048
7	February 14, 2021	Tom & Jerry	US$204,460
8	February 21, 2021	Tom & Jerry	US$746,000
9	February 28, 2021	Tom & Jerry	US$199,275
10	March 7, 2021	Raya and the Last Dragon	US$45,068
11	March 14, 2021	Raya and the Last Dragon	US$23,171
12	March 21, 2021	Raya and the Last Dragon	US$7,322
13	March 28, 2021	Raya and the Last Dragon	US$1,128
14	April 4, 2021	Raya and the Last Dragon	US$5,074
15	April 11, 2021	Raya and the Last Dragon	US$7,109
16	April 18, 2021	Raya and the Last Dragon	US$5,786
17	April 25, 2021	Raya and the Last Dragon	US$10,625
18	May 2, 2021	Godzilla vs. Kong	US$479,629
19	May 9, 2021	Godzilla vs. Kong	US$363,984
20	May 16, 2021	Godzilla vs. Kong	US$325,000
21	May 23, 2021	Mortal Kombat	US$264,150
22	May 30, 2021	Cruella	US$324,589
23	June 6, 2021	Cruella	US$384,915
24	June 13, 2021	The Conjuring: The Devil Made Me Do It	US$1,300,000
25	June 20, 2021	Spiral	US$276,672
26	June 27, 2021	F9	US$2,651,000
27	July 4, 2021	The Croods: A New Age	US$500,000
28	July 11, 2021	Black Widow	US$2,406,060
29	July 18, 2021	Black Widow	US$1,383,639
30	July 25, 2021	A Quiet Place Part II	US$845,000
31	August 1, 2021	F9	US$505,305
32	August 8, 2021	The Suicide Squad	US$1,805,249
32	August 15, 2021	The Suicide Squad	US$1,952,857
33	August 22, 2021	Free Guy	US$1,031,712
34	August 29, 2021	Free Guy	US$847,697
35	September 5, 2021	Shang-Chi and the Legend of the Ten Rings	US$2,087,843
36	September 12, 2021	Shang-Chi and the Legend of the Ten Rings	US$3,388,993
37	September 19, 2021	Shang-Chi and the Legend of the Ten Rings	US$854,094
38	September 26, 2021	Shang-Chi and the Legend of the Ten Rings	US$769,457
39	October 3, 2021	No Time to Die	US$1,302,000
40	October 10, 2021	Venom: Let There Be Carnage	US$2,821,472
41	October 17, 2021	Venom: Let There Be Carnage	US$2,397,322
42	October 24, 2021	Venom: Let There Be Carnage	US$1,136,937
43	October 31, 2021	Venom: Let There Be Carnage	US$757,958
44	November 7, 2021	Eternals	US$4,168,216
45	November 14, 2021	Eternals	US$2,402,175
46	November 21, 2021	Eternals	US$1,101,210
47	November 28, 2021	Encanto	US$732,636
48	December 5, 2021	Encanto	US$694,344
49	December 12, 2021	Encanto	US$554,833
50	December 19, 2021	Spider-Man: No Way Home †	US$17,900,000
51	December 26, 2021	Spider-Man: No Way Home †	US$5,000,000

== Highest-grossing films ==
Highest-grossing films of 2021
Rank	Title	Distributor	Gross R$	Gross US$
1	Spider-Man: No Way Home	Sony	$322 636 357	$59,858,322.26
2	Eternals	Disney	$69 701 009	$12,931,541.56
3	F9	Universal	$ 67 678 536	$12,556,314.66
4	Venom: Let There Be Carnage	Sony	$65 526 486	$12,157,047.5
5	Shang-Chi and the Legend of the Ten Rings	Disney	$38 418 869	$7,487,715
6	Black Widow	Disney	$ 33 101 237	$6,620,265
7	The Conjuring: The Devil Made Me Do It	Warner Bros.	$ 28 444 406	$5,277,255.29
8	The Suicide Squad	Warner Bros.	$23 021 236	$4,271,101.3
9	No Time to Die	Universal	$22 489 692	$4,172,484.6
10	Encanto	Disney	$20 090 649	$3,727,393.14
11	The Matrix Resurrections	Warner Bros.	$19 521 752	$3,621,846.38
12	Dune	Warner Bros.	$15 866 453	$2,943,683.3
13	Space Jam: A New Legacy	Warner Bros.	$14 179 424	$2,630,690.91
14	The Croods: A New Age	Universal	$12 760 296	$2,367,401.86
15	Godzilla vs. Kong	Warner Bros.	$12 324 024	$2,286,460.85
16	PAW Patrol: The Movie	Paramount	$ 11 892 533	$2,206,406.86
17	The Addams Family 2	Universal	$ 10 943 869	$2,030,402.41
18	The Boss Baby 2	Universal	$10 734 608	$1,991,578.48
19	A Quiet Place Part II	Paramount	$10 507 047	$1,949,359.37
20	Cruella	Disney	$10 349 665	$1,920,160.48

== See also ==
- List of 2025 box office number-one films in Brazil
