= Marcelo Bianconi =

Brazilian sports journalist (1956–2025)

Marcelo Gomes Bianconi
- Born: 1956; Mococa, São Paulo, Brazil
- Died: August 17, 2025 (aged 69); Mococa, São Paulo, Brazil
- Citizenship: Brazilian
- Occupations: Sports journalist, reporter, sports commentator
- Years active: 1986–2012
- Employer(s): Band, Rede Globo, SporTV, ESPN Brasil, TV Cultura, RedeTV!
- Known for: Sports journalism, reporting, commentary
- Notable work: Show do Esporte coverage of Formula 1 and Campeonato Brasileiro Série A
- Relatives: Miguel Bianconi (nephew)
- Awards: Bola de Ouro

Marcelo Gomes Bianconi (1956 – August 17, 2025) was a Brazilian journalist, reporter and sports commentator.

== Life and career ==
Bianconi began his sports journalism career at the age of 19, still studying journalism. He was a sports reporter at Band, participating in the house's sports programs, such as Show do Esporte, where he worked for 10 years. He had a brief stint at TV Globo and SporTV, and worked for seven years at ESPN Brasil and TV Cultura.

He covered Formula One, the Brazilian Championship and other sports.

== Death ==
Bianconi died from cancer on August 17, 2025, at the age of 69.
