= List of 2024 box office number-one films in Brazil =

This is a list of films which placed number-one at the weekend box office in Brazil during 2024.

#	Weekend end date	Film	Weekend gross	Ref.
1	January 7, 2024	Aquaman and the Lost Kingdom	$1,948,051.95	
2	January 14, 2024	Aquaman and the Lost Kingdom	$1,209,647.5	
3	January 21, 2024	Aquaman and the Lost Kingdom	$836,734.69	
4	January 28, 2024	Nosso Lar 2: Os Mensageiros	$2,204,081.63	
5	February 4, 2024	Anyone but You	$1,040,816.33	
6	February 11, 2024	Anyone but You	$844,155.84	
7	February 18, 2024	Madame Web	$1,107,606.68	
8	February 25, 2024	Madame Web	$844,155.84	
9	March 3, 2024	Dune: Part Two	$2,100,000	
10	March 10, 2024	Os Farofeiros 2	$1,667,903.53	
11	March 17, 2024	Os Farofeiros 2	$1,192,949.91	
12	March 24, 2024	Kung Fu Panda 4	$2,374,689	
13	March 31, 2024	Godzilla x Kong: The New Empire	$2,600,000	
14	April 7, 2024	Godzilla x Kong: The New Empire	$1,649,350.65	
15	April 14, 2024	Godzilla x Kong: The New Empire	$879,406.31	
16	April 21, 2024	Civil War	$1,205,936.92	
17	April 28, 2024	Civil War	$939,662	
18	May 5, 2024	The Garfield Movie	$2,128,014.84	
19	May 12, 2024	Kingdom of the Planet of the Apes	$2,554,157	
20	May 19, 2024	Kingdom of the Planet of the Apes	$2,102,545	
21	May 26, 2024	Furiosa: A Mad Max Saga	$1,500,000	
22	June 2, 2024	Kingdom of the Planet of the Apes	$1,268,624	
23	June 9, 2024	Bad Boys: Ride or Die	$1717996.29	
24	June 16, 2024	Bad Boys: Ride or Die	$1474953.62	
25	June 23, 2024	Inside Out 2	$17,604,728	
26	June 30, 2024	Inside Out 2	$13,412,149	
27	July 7, 2024	Inside Out 2	$9,237,667	
28	July 14, 2024	Inside Out 2	$5,467,877	
29	July 21, 2024	Inside Out 2	$3,648,475	
30	July 28, 2024	Deadpool & Wolverine	$9,860,817	
31	August 4, 2024	Deadpool & Wolverine	$4,708,724	
32	August 11, 2024	It Ends with Us	$3,400,000	
33	August 18, 2024	It Ends with Us	$2,100,000	
34	August 25, 2024	It Ends with Us	$1,101,113.17	
35	September 1, 2024	It Ends with Us	$682,745.83	
36	September 8, 2024	Beetlejuice Beetlejuice	$1,200,000	
37	September 15, 2024	Beetlejuice Beetlejuice	$857,142.86	
38	September 22, 2024	Jung Kook: I am Still	$608,534.32	
39	September 29, 2024	The Forge	$508,903	
40	October 6, 2024	Joker: Folie à Deux	$4,300,000	
41	October 13, 2024	Joker: Folie à Deux	$1,400,000	
42	October 20, 2024	The Forge	$1,114,105	
43	October 27, 2024	Venom: The Last Dance	$2,825,602.97	
44	November 3, 2024	Venom: The Last Dance	$1,897,959.18	
45	November 10, 2024	I'm Still Here	$1,300,000	
46	November 17, 2024	Gladiator II	$3,000,000	
47	November 24, 2024	I'm Still Here	$1,500,000	
48	December 1, 2024	Moana 2	$7,698,971	
49	December 8, 2024	Moana 2	$5,118,324	
50	December 15, 2024	Moana 2	$2,941,598	
51	December 22, 2024	Mufasa: The Lion King	$3,959,730	
52	December 29, 2024	O Auto da Compadecida 2	$4,378,478.66	

== Highest-grossing films ==
Highest-grossing films of 2024
Rank	Title	Distributor	Gross R$	Gross US$
1	Inside Out 2	Disney	$442,101,148	$82,022,476.44
2	Moana 2	Disney	$177,353,562	$32,904,185.9
3	Deadpool & Wolverine	Disney	$155,895,852	$28,923,163.64
4	Despicable Me 4	Universal	$151,384,146	$28,086,112.43
5	Mufasa: The Lion King	Disney	$125,414,354	$23,267,969.2
6	I'm Still Here	Sony	$117,630,000	$21,823,747.68
7	O Auto da Compadecida 2	Globo Filmes	$84,417,597	$15,661,891.84
8	Sonic the Hedgehog 3	Paramount	$84,013,931	$15,587,000.19
9	It Ends with Us	Sony	$58,614,018	$10,874,585.9
10	Kingdom of the Planet of the Apes	Disney	$53,314,856	$9,891,438.96

== See also ==
- List of Brazilian films — Brazilian films by year
- 2024 in Brazil

Preceded by 2023	Box office number-one films 2024	Succeeded by 2025
