= List of 2026 box office number-one films in Brazil =

This is a list of films which placed number-one at the weekend box office in Brazil during 2026.

#	Weekend end date	Film	Box office	Openings in the top ten	Ref.
1	January 4, 2026	Avatar: Fire and Ash	$2,449,299		
2	January 11, 2026	Avatar: Fire and Ash	$2,239,852	Tom and Jerry: Forbidden Compass (#5), Agentes Muito Especiais (#7), Rental Family (#10)	
3	January 18, 2026	The Housemaid	$1,979,591	David (#5), Hamnet (#7), 28 Years Later: The Bone Temple (#8),O Diário de Pilar na Amazônia (#10)	
4	January 25, 2026	The Housemaid	$1,658,627	Marty Supreme (#5), The Lord of the Rings: The Return of the King - Extended Edition (#6), Return to Silent Hill (#9), Mercy (#10)	
5	February 1, 2026	The Housemaid	$1,091,402	Send Help (#7), Primate (#8), Cold Storage (#9)	
6	February 8, 2026	The Housemaid	$1,283,684	Stray Kids: The dominATE Experience (#4), Greenland 2: Migration (#5), Whistle (#8)	
7	February 15, 2026	Wuthering Heights	$995,996	Goat (#4), Crime 101 (#7)	
8	February 22, 2026	Wuthering Heights	$840,445	Keeper (#8)	
9	March 1, 2026	Scream 7	$1,946,196	How to Make a Killing (#7), Twenty One Pilots: More Than We Ever Imagined (#10)	
10	March 8, 2026	Hoppers	$1,956,089	The Bride! (#3), Kill Bill: The Whole Bloody Affair (#7), ENHYPEN [WALK THE LINE SUMMER EDITION] (#10)	
11	March 15, 2026	Hoppers	$1,125,594	Shelter (#3), Bodycam (#5), Iron Lung (#8)	
12	March 22, 2026	Project Hail Mary	$1,243,042	Twilight (#2), Reminders of Him (#4), Ready or Not 2: Here I Come (#6), La grazia (#10)	
13	March 29, 2026	Project Hail Mary	$1,365,993.21	Velhos Bandidos (#3), Nuremberg (#5), They Will Kill You (#8), Protector (#9)	
14	April 5, 2026	The Super Mario Galaxy Movie	$5,337,000	The Drama (#7), The Last Supper (#8)	
15	April 12, 2026	The Super Mario Galaxy Movie	$3,302,000	BTS World Tour 'Arirang' In Goyang: Live Viewing (#4), The Strangers – Chapter 3 (#6), The Wizard of the Kremlin (#10)	
16	April 19, 2026	The Super Mario Galaxy Movie	$1,820,132.31	Lee Cronin's The Mummy (#2), BTS World Tour 'Arirang' In Japan: Live Viewing (#5), The Twilight Saga: New Moon (#6), Rio de Sangue (#8), O Advogado de Deus (#9)	
17	April 26, 2026	Michael	$5,998,882	Um Pai em Apuros (#6), Imovision European Cinema Festival (#8), Good Luck, Have Fun, Don't Die (#9)	
18	May 3, 2026	The Devil Wears Prada 2	$12,164,000	Zico, o Samurai de Quintino (#5), 2DIE4 - 24 Horas No Limite (#8), Exit 8 (#9)	
19	May 10, 2026	The Devil Wears Prada 2	$5,670,000	Mortal Kombat II (#3), Billie Eilish – Hit Me Hard and Soft: The Tour (Live in 3D) (#4), The Sheep Detectives (#6), Iron Maiden: Burning Ambition (#7), Dolly (#10)	
20	May 17, 2026	The Devil Wears Prada 2	$3,560,000	Obsession (#4), In the Grey (#6), Authentic Games - No Império Desconectado (#7), O Gênio do Crime (#8), Top Gun 40th Anniversary (#9), Top Gun: Maverick (#10)	
21	May 24, 2026	Michael	$2,108,223	The Mandalorian & Grogu (#3), Passenger (#5), Sexo e Destino (#8), Hokum (#9), 2026 TXT MOA CON IN JAPAN: LIVE VIEWING (#10)	
22	May 31, 2026	Backrooms	$1,833,633	2026 UEFA Champions League final (#6), Animal Farm (#7), Fuze (#8), Bitter Christmas (#10)	
23	June 7, 2026	Scary Movie	$5,100,000	Masters of the Universe (#2)	
24	June 14, 2026	Disclosure Day	$2,700,000	BTS World Tour 'Arirang' In Busan: Live Viewing (#5), You, Me & Tuscany (#10)	
25	June 21, 2026	Toy Story 5	$6,539,000	Quinze Dias (#8)	
26	June 28, 2026	Toy Story 5	$4,448,000	Supergirl (#2), Shell (#8), Amrum (#10)	
27	July 5, 2026	Toy Story 5	$2,592,526.37	Minions & Monsters (#2)	
28	July 12, 2026	Toy Story 5	$3,679,000	Moana (#2), Evil Dead Burn (#4), The Invite (#5)	
29	July 19, 2026	The Odyssey	$4,754,000		
30	July 26, 2026	The Odyssey	$4,273,198.64	Deep Water (#6), Marsupilami (#9)	
31	August 2, 2026	Spider-Man: Brand New Day	$23,800,000	Colours of Time (#8)	
32	August 9, 2026	Spider-Man: Brand New Day	$13,035,937.78	Paw Patrol: The Dino Movie (#7), Saccharine (#8), Ateez: Light the Way in Cinemas (#9)	
33	August 16, 2026	Spider-Man: Brand New Day	$7,394,957.98	The End of Oak Street (#4), Katseye: Wild Hearts (#6), The Death of Robin Hood (#7), 2026 Cortis Put Your Phone Down Tour in LA (#9), The Twilight Saga: Breaking Dawn - Part 1 (#10)	
34	August 23, 2026	Spider-Man: Brand New Day	$3,969,247.27	Insidious: Out of the Further (#2), One Night Only (#6), La La Land re-release (#9), Grave of the Fireflies (#10)	
35	August 30, 2026	Spider-Man: Brand New Day	$2,345,789.38	Harry Potter and the Philosopher's Stone - 25th Anniversary (#2), Coyote vs. Acme (#4), The Dog Stars (#7), Akira (#9)	
36	September 6, 2026	Minha Melhor Amiga	$2,034,686.21	Ice Cream Man (#7), Pressure (#9)	
37	September 13, 2026	Minha Melhor Amiga	$2,630,073.31	Practical Magic 2 (#3), Mutiny (#4), The Magic Faraway Tree (#6)	
38	September 20, 2026	Minha Melhor Amiga	$2,951,904.17	Resident Evil (#2), Antártida (#8), Cats in the Museum 2: Treasures of Egypt (#10)	
39	September 27, 2026	Avengers Endgame: Encore	$3,525,000	Heart of the Beast (#4), Forgotten Island (#6), Marido de Aluguel (#8)	
40	October 4, 2026	Verity	$3,500,000	Digger (#6), Galinha Pintadinha: O Filme (#7), Fall 2: Deadpoint (#9)	
41	October 11, 2026	Verity	$1,967,908	Other Mommy (#3), Cars 20th Anniversary (#4), Se Eu Fosse Você 3 (#5), Tad and the Magic Lamp (#6), Hope (#9), Um Tio Quase Perfeito 3 (#10)	
42	October 18, 2026	Verity	$1,200,000	Street Fighter (#2), Whalefall (#5), The Hunger Games: Catching Fire (#10)	
43	October 25, 2026	Clayface	$879,000	BTS World Tour 'Arirang' In Buenos Aires: Live Viewing (#4), Daniel and The Fiery Furnace (#6), The Social Reckoning (#9)	
44	November 1, 2026	BTS World Tour 'Arirang' In São Paulo: Live Viewing	$1,752,190.24	Wildwood (#2), As Dez Vantagens de Morrer Depois de Você (#5), Runner (#8), 100 Dias (#9)	
45	November 8, 2026	Os Farofeiros 3	$1,092,436.97	Stray Kids: RUN IT Live Viewing (#2), Godzilla Minus Zero (#3), The Cat in the Hat (#4), Gugu's World (#7)	
46	November 15, 2026	Os Farofeiros 3	$704,451.99	Ebenezer (#2), The Fast and the Furious: 25th Anniversary (#3), A Virada: Ignição da Alma (#8), How to Rob a Bank (#9)	

== See also ==
- 2026 in Brazil

Preceded by 2025 Box office number-one films	Box office number-one films 2026	Succeeded by 2027 Box office number-one films
