= Celso Frateschi =

Brazilian actor

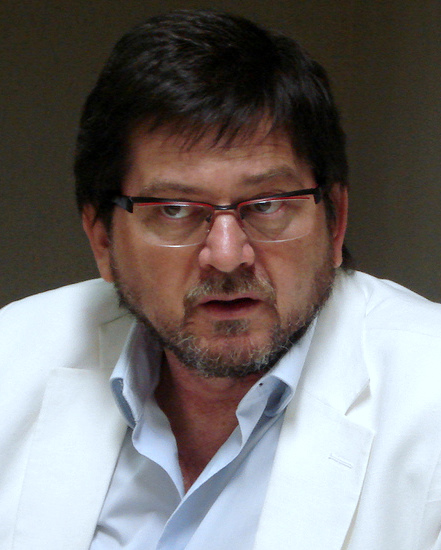
- Born: February 9, 1952 (age 74); São Paulo, Brazil
- Occupation: Actor
- Years active: 1985–present
- Relatives: Paulo Frateschi (brother); André Frateschi (son)

Celso Frateschi (born February 9, 1952) is a Brazilian actor, director, author and politician.

== Biography ==
Celso was born in São Paulo, Brazil, a brother of politician Paulo Frateschi (1950–2025). He is affiliated with the Workers' Party and married the architect and set designer Sylvia Moreira, father of the also actor André Frateschi and Ludmila Frateschi.

He was Municipal Secretary of Culture of São Paulo, in the management of Marta Suplicy, and Secretary of Culture in São Bernardo do Campo.

He owns Teatro Ágora, in São Paulo. He played Richard III and The Dream of a Ridiculous Man with great success. Actor, director and author, he was one of the founders of the groups Teatro Núcleo Independente, Teatro Pequeno, and Ágora - Center for Theatrical Development, of São Paulo. He made his debut at the São Paulo Arena Theater in 1980, in Augusto Boal's Teatro Jornal 1ª Edição. He worked with some of the most notable directors of Brazilian theater, such as Enrique Diaz, José Possi Neto and Domingos de Oliveira.

He wrote A epidemia, with Paulo Maurício, and Os Imigrantes, with which he debuted as director and received, in 1978, the 'Mambembe Award' for best actor. He received the 'Shell Award' for best actor in 1988 for Eras by Heiner Müller.

He is a licensed professor at the School of Dramatic Arts at USP. He was Municipal Secretary of Culture in Santo André and São Paulo, in the management of Marta Suplicy, in 2003 and 2004. He was Funarte's president until October 2008, when he resigned. In a letter entitled "The transatlantic phantom", published at the night of August 6, Frateschi says he will not resist the "articulated movement of some officials and some sectors of the Ministry of Culture to destabilize my management in the Funarte presidency."

In August 2008, Celso Frateschi inaugurated his blog on the website of Bravo! Magazine. He also produced Uncle Vanya by Anton Chekhov.

== Filmography ==
=== Television ===
- 1985 Uma Esperança no Ar - Rui
- 1994 Memorial de Maria Moura - Liberato
- 1994 Você Decide - Pressão Total
- 1998 Pecado Capital - Pacheco
- 1998 Torre de Babel - Delegado
- 2000 A Muralha - Afonso Góis
- 2001 Presença de Anita - Igor
- 2002 O Beijo do Vampiro - Ezequiel
- 2004 Começar de Novo - Mikhail
- 2004 Um Só Coração - Ernesto da Silva
- 2005 Belíssima - Juiz
- 2005 Carga Pesada - Casão
- 2005 Essas Mulheres - Pedro Camargo
- 2006 A Diarista - Nestor
- 2006 Sinhá Moça - Inácio
- 2007 Paixões Proibidas - Álvaro de Sousa
- 2008 Casos e Acasos - 3 Episodes
- 2008 Queridos Amigos - Dr. Hélio Gomes Vianna
- 2009 Uns Braços - Borges Solicitor
- 2009 Força-Tarefa - Valfrido
- 2010 Escrito nas Estrelas - Jardel
- 2011 O Astro - Nelson Cerqueira
- 2013 José do Egito - Jacó
- 2014 Sessão de Terapia - Guilherme Damasceno
- 2016 Êta Mundo Bom! - Barão de Goytacazes
- 2016 3% - Cause Leader

=== Cinema ===
- 1997 O Trabalho dos Homens - Police
- 1997 Os Matadores
- 1998 Contos de Lygia
- 2001 Bufo & Spallanzani - Dr. Ribeiroles
- 2001 Mater Dei
- 2001 Sonhos Tropicais - Sales Guerra
- 2003 Cristina Quer Casar
- 2006 Veias e Vinhos - Uma História Brasileira - Capitão
- 2018 Paraíso Perdido - Delegado
