= Cemitério de Perus =

Cemetery in São Paulo, Brazil

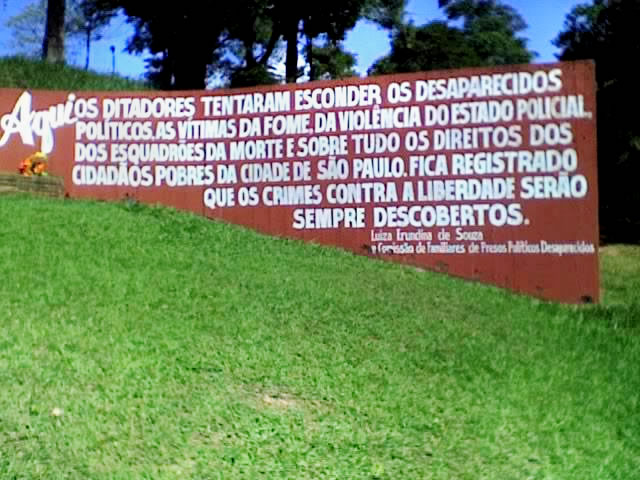
- Mural in honor of the victims of military dictatorship buried in the cemetery. It reads: "Here the dictators tried to hide the political disappeared, the victims of hunger, of police state violence, of death squads and above all, the rights of São Paulo city's poor people. Let be known that crimes against freedom shall be always revealed"
- Interactive map of Cemitério de Perus

Details
- Established: 1971
- Location: São Paulo
- Country: Brazil
- Coordinates: 23°23′34″S 46°44′35″W
- Type: Public

The Cemitério de Perus (officially Cemitério Dom Bosco), currently renamed Colina dos Mártires (Hill of Martyrs), is a cemetery located in the northern part of the city of São Paulo, Brazil, on the edge of the homonymous subprefecture, near the border with the city of Caieiras. Created in 1971 by then-mayor Paulo Maluf, it is about 254,000 square meters in length.

The cemetery is known for burying poor people, for its location and price; it was built to bury the bodies of homeless and unidentified people, currently burying 12 people a day on average. It has 46,000 graves and has over 150,000 burials in all its length. It also has space for wakes with six rooms and parking, and has an ecumenical chapel.

During the period of the military dictatorship (1964-1985), the cemetery was used for the burial of people killed by the regime's security forces. Remains of 1,049 disappeared people were thrown into the cemetery's clandestine mass grave. They remained there until 1990, when the grave was opened and investigated by order of Mayor Luiza Erundina.

In 1993 a memorial in honor of the victims was opened in the cemetery. In 2025, the Brazilian government issued an apology over the clandestine burials of victims of the military dictatorship.

== History ==
=== Foundation ===
The Dom Bosco Municipal Cemetery (or Perus Cemetery), located in the Perus District, was opened in 1971 by the São Paulo City Hall under the administration of Paulo Maluf. Soon after its opening, it underwent a transformation that made it an exclusive cemetery for the bodies of the homeless.

=== 1970–1980: Clandestine Burials by the Military Dictatorship ===
During the 1964–1985 military dictatorship, the cemetery was used for the clandestine burial of members of armed organizations fighting against the dictatorship and killed on the premises of repressive agencies, such as the DOI-CODI. Many of the people killed by the death squads of the newly organized Military Police were also buried clandestinely in the Perus Cemetery.

In 1969, São Paulo Mayor Paulo Maluf and Harry Shibata, director of the City's Forensic Medicine Institute, considered the possibility of building a crematorium in the cemetery. Municipal Funeral Service officials traveled to other countries to analyze proposals, and a British company was even contacted to build two crematoriums for the cemetery. However, the company rejected the deal because, aware of the violent repression perpetrated by the state, they considered suspicious the fact that the crematorium design did not include a chapel or any place to publicly mourn the bodies to be cremated.

The crematorium project, initially planned for the Perus Cemetery, was transferred to the Vila Nova Cachoeirinha Cemetery and later to Vila Alpina, where it was built in 1975. Between 1975 and 1976, several bones were thrown into a common, clandestine grave in the cemetery.

=== Discovery of remains ===
In 1990, after years of rumors about the existence of a clandestine grave, the site was excavated by order of Mayor Luiza Erundina. 1,049 unidentified bones were found there.

These bones are real and current evidence of the violence that has prevailed in the country over the last three decades, in addition to police violence against the poor in São Paulo. More recent research using radar shows the possibility of a second clandestine grave, where more bodies may be buried, or it may be an unexcavated portion of the first grave. The certainty of impunity and the frequent disrespectful treatment of the bodies of poor people in the city were two factors that allowed dead militants to disappear in the nation's own cemeteries.

=== Identification work ===
In April 2022, identification work on 1,049 remains was completed, allowing DNA collection to begin. Some of the dead were executed by the group known as O Esquadrão da Morte (the Death Squad). At least 40 missing political figures were reportedly buried at the site, with five of the remains already identified as:

- Dênis Casemiro
- Dimas Antonio Casemiro
- Frederico Antonio Mayr
- Flávio Carvalho Molina
- Aluísio Palhano Pedreira Ferreira

Initially, the remains were temporarily transferred to the headquarters of the Federal Public Prosecutor's Office in the Bela Vista neighborhood of São Paulo until they could be taken for analysis at Unifesp. It was estimated that among the bodies buried in this grave, twenty were political prisoners and enemies of the Brazilian military regime that ruled between 1964 and 1985, while the rest were victims of violence from that period. All were buried as indigents.

For the analysis, age, sex, and height were first identified. Of the 435 boxes of bones sent to Unifesp, 375 were opened in 2015. Of these, 80% of the analyzed contents corresponded to males, 15% to females, and the remainder to children and adolescents. Signs of trauma that could be interpreted as torture or violence were also identified. Most of the bones found were intact, but being in the same box made identification difficult.

Minister Pepe Vargas, of the Human Rights Secretariat, stated that the search for the truth about what happened during the dictatorship was a fundamental task of a democratic state, important both for understanding the form of repression and preventing its recurrence, as well as for the significance of symbolic reparation for the victims of the dictatorship. The municipal secretary of Services, Simão Pedro, said that with this search they were "turning a new page" and built two monuments in the Perus and Vila Formosa cemeteries to comfort the families of the deceased and so that they can honor them. Among these monuments, one of them is the graffiti that was made in partnership with Perusferia de Graffitti.
