= Uruguaiana =

Municipality of Rio Grande do Sul, Brazil

- Municipality
- Municipality of Uruguaiana
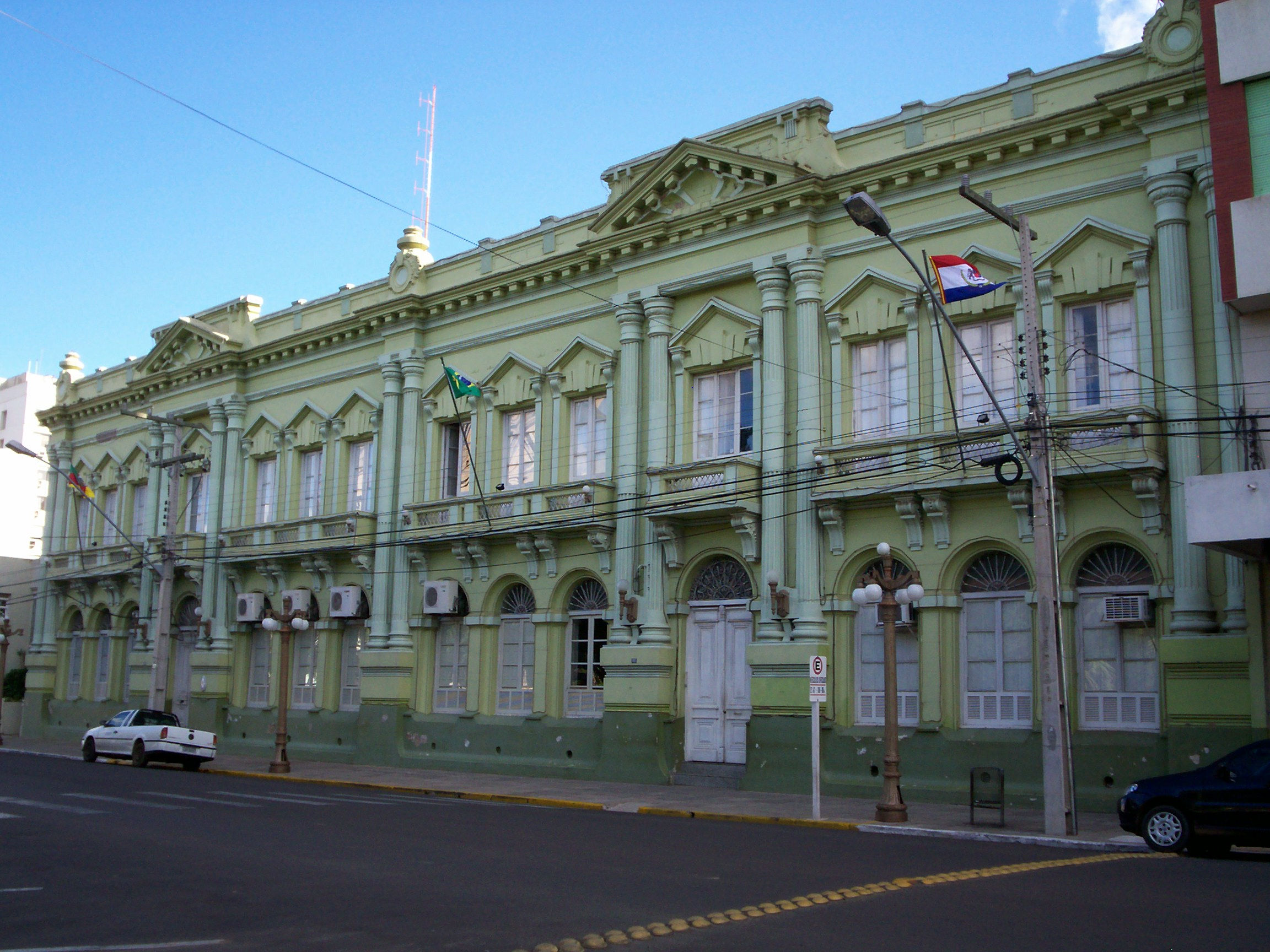

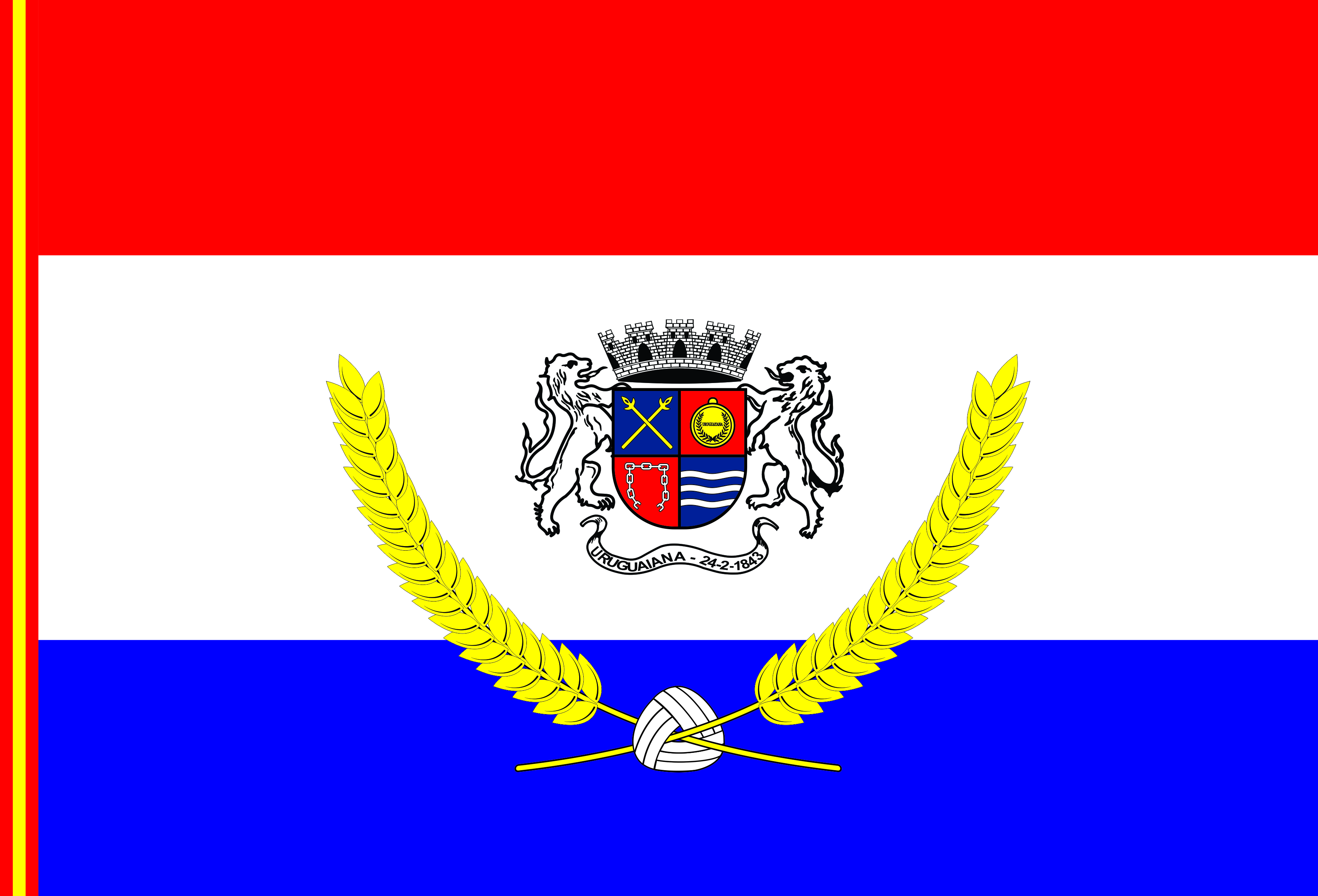
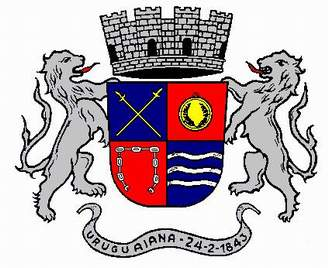
- Flag Coat of arms

- Location in Rio Grande do Sul, Brazil

- Location in Brazil
- Coordinates: 29°45′18″S 57°5′16″W
- Country: Brazil
- Region: South
- State: Rio Grande do Sul
- Founded: 1843

Government
  - Mayor: Ronnie Colpo Mello (PP)

Area
  - Total: 5,702.098 km^{2} (2,201.592 sq mi)
- Elevation: 66 m (217 ft)

Population (2022 Census)
  - Total: 117,210
  - Estimate (2025): 120,819
  - Density: 20.556/km^{2} (53.239/sq mi)
- Time zone: BRT
- HDI (2010): 0.744 – high
- Website: www.uruguaiana.rs.gov.br

Uruguaiana is a city and municipality in the Brazilian state of Rio Grande do Sul. It is located on the eastern shore of the Uruguay River bordering Argentina. Opposite to Uruguaiana, and joined to it by a road/railway bridge, lies the Argentine city of Paso de los Libres, Corrientes. North of Uruguaiana lies the Brazilian municipality of Itaqui, connected by a bridge constructed by the British in 1888 over the Ibicuí River. The municipality also borders the municipalities of Alegrete, Barra do Quaraí and Quaraí, and, also, Uruguay, making it one of the few international triple-border municipalities of Brazil.

The city marks the southernmost point reached by the Paraguayans in the Paraguayan War; after being taken without resistance, it was recaptured after a six-week siege that effectively ended the phase of Paraguayan offensive operations.

Nowadays, Uruguaiana represents the most populated city in western Rio Grande do Sul.

Uruguaiana is also home to the California da Canção Nativa.

== Geography ==
=== Communications and distances ===
The major highways connecting Uruguaiana with other cities in Rio Grande do Sul are BR 472, to Barra do Quaraí in the south and São Borja in the north, BR 290, to Alegrete and Porto Alegre in the east.

The city is served by Ruben Berta International Airport, the largest airport in the interior of the state. It had a traffic of over 3,000 passengers in 2008 with 1,409 planes using the facilities.

Some of the distances between Uruguaiana and other cities in the state are:

- Porto Alegre: 649 km.
- Santa Maria: 365 km.
- Pelotas: 649 km.
- Rio Grande: 701 km.
- Bagé: 454 km.
- Chuí: 904 km.
- Passo Fundo: 562 km.

=== Climate ===
Uruguaiana has a humid subtropical climate (Köppen: Cfa) with hot summers and mild winters.

Climate data for Uruguaiana (1991–2020)
Month	Jan	Feb	Mar	Apr	May	Jun	Jul	Aug	Sep	Oct	Nov	Dec	Year
Mean daily maximum °C (°F)	32.1 (89.8)	30.8 (87.4)	29.2 (84.6)	25.7 (78.3)	21.7 (71.1)	19.2 (66.6)	19.0 (66.2)	21.7 (71.1)	22.9 (73.2)	25.5 (77.9)	28.4 (83.1)	30.9 (87.6)	25.6 (78.1)
Daily mean °C (°F)	25.8 (78.4)	24.7 (76.5)	23.0 (73.4)	19.6 (67.3)	15.9 (60.6)	13.5 (56.3)	12.9 (55.2)	14.9 (58.8)	16.7 (62.1)	19.7 (67.5)	22.3 (72.1)	24.6 (76.3)	19.5 (67.1)
Mean daily minimum °C (°F)	19.8 (67.6)	19.3 (66.7)	17.7 (63.9)	14.7 (58.5)	11.4 (52.5)	9.2 (48.6)	8.4 (47.1)	9.7 (49.5)	11.5 (52.7)	14.5 (58.1)	16.6 (61.9)	18.7 (65.7)	14.3 (57.7)
Average precipitation mm (inches)	129.6 (5.10)	152.9 (6.02)	158.5 (6.24)	161.7 (6.37)	118.3 (4.66)	85.7 (3.37)	65.2 (2.57)	62.6 (2.46)	86.6 (3.41)	180.8 (7.12)	122.1 (4.81)	157.6 (6.20)	1,481.6 (58.33)
Average precipitation days (≥ 1.0 mm 0)	13	13	11	9	8	9	9	8	11	12	10	11	124
Average relative humidity (%)	66.4	70.5	72.3	75.7	78.9	80.0	78.0	73.7	72.1	72.4	66.9	66.6	72.8
Average dew point °C (°F)	20.0 (68.0)	19.9 (67.8)	18.8 (65.8)	16.2 (61.2)	13.1 (55.6)	11.0 (51.8)	9.9 (49.8)	11.1 (52.0)	12.5 (54.5)	15.4 (59.7)	16.7 (62.1)	18.7 (65.7)	15.3 (59.5)
Mean monthly sunshine hours	258.9	203.3	213.8	174.2	156.8	125.1	156.2	170.8	175.8	198.8	245.2	249.9	2,328.8
Source 1: NOAA
Source 2: Instituto Nacional de Meteorologia (precipitation days 1981–2010)

== Economy ==
The economy is mainly based on services, followed by industry and agriculture in that order. The sectors employing the most workers were industry, 1,187 workers; commerce, 7,662 workers; public administration, 2,248 workers; transport, communications and storage, 3,303 workers; education, 573 workers; and health, 774 workers.

In 2006 there were 829 agricultural establishments, employing around 3,400 workers. There were 207,000 head of cattle. The main crops were soybeans (633 hectares), wheat (320 hectares), and rice (58,000 hectares).

=== Secondary sector ===
The city is pioneer of oil refining in Brazil; the construction of the Refinaria Riograndense de Petróleo in 1932—conceived and established by local merchants—propelled Uruguaiana to international prominence, given the economic, military, and social importance the refinery held at the time.

This refinery became the birthplace of the current giant Ipiranga Group, which now has a presence in nearly every Brazilian city, particularly in the South and Southeast regions.

Natural gas supplied via pipeline from Argentina enables Uruguaiana to generate 639 MW through the AES Uruguaiana plant. This facility, which began operations in 2000, was the first natural gas-fired thermoelectric power plant in Brazil.

== Health ==
Health care for the population is mainly provided by public facilities. In 2005 there were 49 health establishments, of which 25 were public facilities. The Municipal Secretariat of Health and the Environment had 16 health centers, including the Health Center of Uruguaina and the Municipal Emergency Care operated by 235 workers.

Uruguaiana had two hospitals, both linked to the national health service. They had 268 beds (2005), with 176 public and 92 private.

== Education ==
The municipal school network was made up of 27 schools, 10 urban and 17 rural, with 567 teachers who administered to 6,222 students in the urban area and 485 in the rural area. In the rural schools there were 30 teachers. The total number of schools both public and private was 110 in 2005. There were 52 primary schools, 4 middle schools, and 44 pre-primary schools in 2007.

Uruguaiana had a university campus with schools of Animal Science, Veterinarian Science, Agronomy, Philosophy, Letters, Accounting, Business Administration, Computer Science, and Law. Enrollment in 2005 was 1,850 students.

== Music ==
Uruguaiana is the home of the yearly Califórnia da Canção Nativa regional gaucho music festival.

== Notable construction works ==
International bridge

On May 21, 1947, the International Getúlio Vargas/Agustín P. Just Road/Railway Bridge on the Uruguay River was inaugurated by presidents Eurico Gaspar Dutra of Brazil and Juan Domingo Perón of Argentina, linking Uruguaiana to the Argentine city of Paso de los Libres. At the time of its construction, the bridge was the greatest work of engineering of South America.

Since 1994 there is a high-voltage direct current (HVDC) back-to-back station for power exchange with Argentina at Uruguaiana. This facility, which was built by Toshiba, can transfer a maximum power of 50 megawatts. The applied DC voltage is 15 kV.

The city is the seat of the Roman Catholic Diocese of Uruguaiana.

== Consular representation ==
Argentina has a Consulate in Uruguaiana.

== See also ==
- List of municipalities in Rio Grande do Sul
