= Sergio Miceli =

Brazilian sociologist (1945–2025)

Sergio Miceli Pessôa de Barros (May 16, 1945 – December 12, 2025) was a Brazilian sociologist, writer and academic.

== Life and career ==
Miceli was born in Rio de Janeiro on May 16, 1945. He graduated in Social Sciences from the Pontifical Catholic University of Rio de Janeiro (PUC-Rio) in 1967.

He moved to the city of São Paulo, to pursue his master's degree at the University of São Paulo (USP), which he obtained in 1971, with A Noite da Madrinha - Ensaio sobre a Indústria Cultural no Brasil, under the guidance of Leôncio Martins Rodrigues. The dissertation was the first to talk about the cultural industry within the sociology of USP and was a milestone for the discipline. Following the tradition of Florestan Fernandes, the agendas of the projects were until then focused on industrial processes, trade unions and conflicts between agrarian and modern Brazil, according to the materialist dialectic of Karl Marx.

Also in 1971, he became a professor at the São Paulo School of Business Administration of the Getúlio Vargas Foundation (EAESP-FGV), where he remained until 1986.

In 1978, he obtained a dual degree in the doctorate, from USP, supervised by Leôncio Martins Rodrigues, and from the École des hautes études en sciences sociales, under the guidance of Pierre Bourdieu, with the thesis Intellectuals and Ruling Class in Brazil, 1920-1945. The doctoral thesis was innovative, because for the first time a sociologist saw Brazilian intellectuals according to their objective aspects of material life, social conditions and trajectories of these authors, linked to the works produced.

Miceli presented the premises of philosopher, anthropologist and sociologist Pierre Bourdieu to USP at a time when Karl Marx's theories were on the rise at the university. He was responsible for strengthening the sociology of culture in São Paulo and in sectors that were previously underprivileged, such as the sociology of art.

He defended his habilitation thesis, The Brazilian Ecclesiastical Elite, 1890-1930, at the State University of Campinas (Unicamp), in 1986. He became a professor at USP in 1989, the same year in which the History of Social Sciences in Brazil (vol.1, 1989; vol.2, 1995) was published, a collective work that he coordinated at the Institute of Economic, Social and Political Studies of São Paulo (IDESP) and which brought together researchers such as Lilia Schwarcz, Mariza Corrêa, Heloisa Pontes, Maria Arminda do Nascimento Arruda, Fernando Limongi and Maria Hermínia Tavares de Almeida, among others.

Miceli was a visiting professor at the National School of Anthropology and History of Mexico, the University of Florida (1987–1988), the University of Chicago (1991–1992), Stanford University (2001–2002) and the École des Hautes Études en Sciences Sociales (2004–2005).

He was also a Commander of the Republic and a member of the Brazilian Academy of Sciences (ABC). Since 2022, he held the position of director-president of the University of São Paulo Press.

Miceli died on December 12, 2025, at the age of 80.
