= Mestre Damasceno =

Brazilian composter (1954–2025)

Damasceno Gregório dos Santos (July 22, 1954 – August 26, 2025), better known as Mestre Damasceno, was a Brazilian Carimbó singer and cultural director.

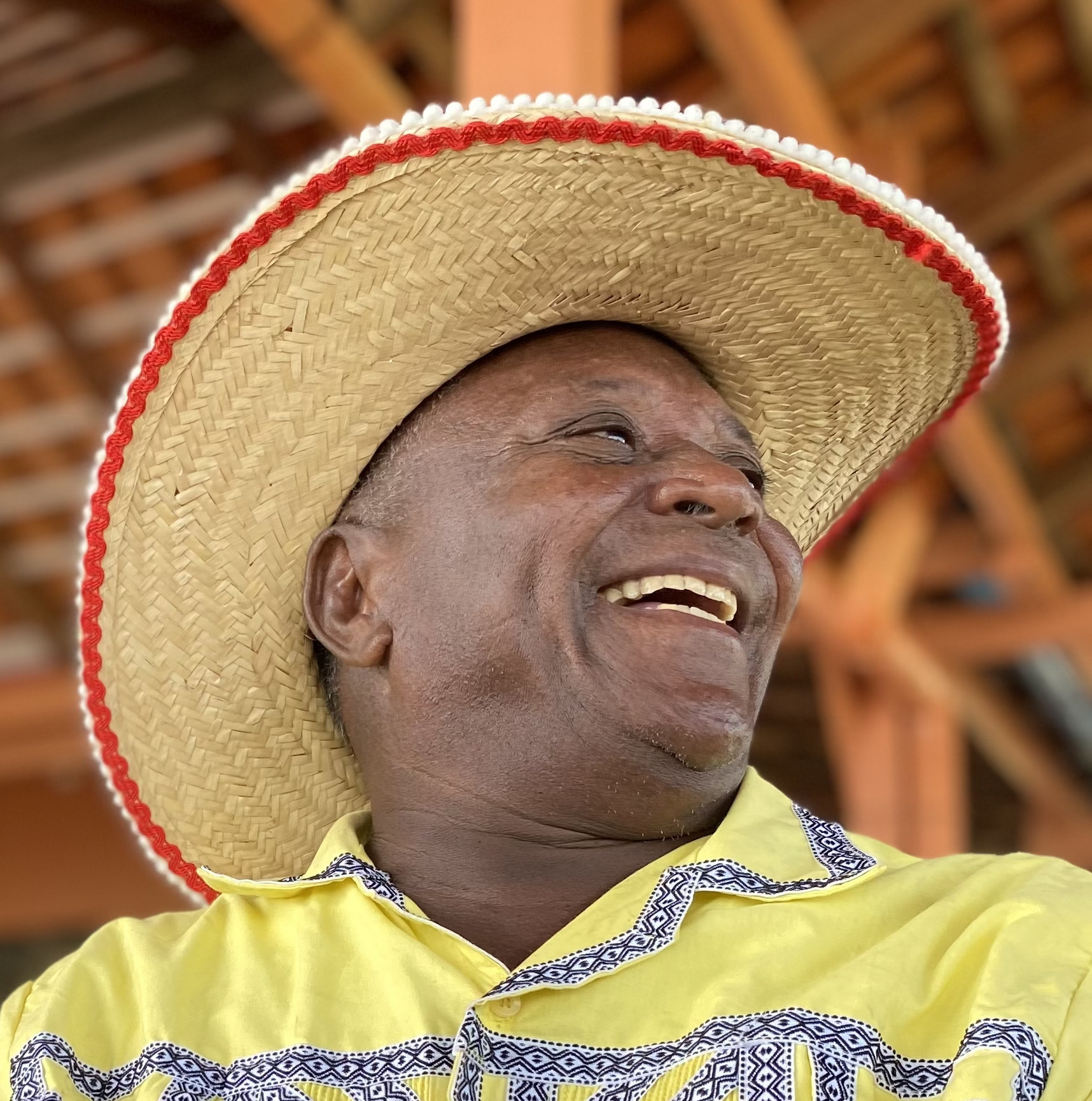
Mestre Damasceno

== Life and career ==
Damasceno was a Carimbó master and creator of the Búfalo-Bumbá de Salvaterra, a June revelry derived from the auto do boi and whose central figure is the Marajoara buffalo.

By 2012, Damasceno had more than 400 compositions. In 2023, he had his work declared as intangible cultural heritage of the State of Pará.

In 2025, Damasceno was awarded as Commander of the Order of Cultural Merit (OMC), receiving the honor in Rio de Janeiro, in a Solemn ceremony attended by the President of the Republic and the Minister of Culture.

== Death ==
Damasceno died August 26, 2025, aged 71.
