= Califórnia da Canção Nativa =

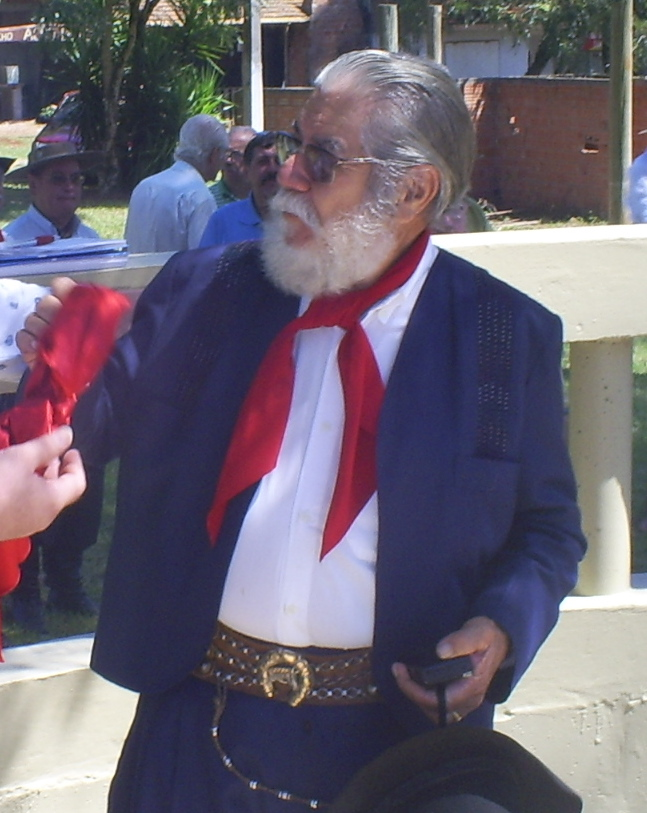
1979 winner of the Calhandra de Ouro with the song Esquilador (sheep shearer), Telmo de Lima Freitas, pictured wearing full traditional Brazilian Gaucho regalia

Califórnia da Canção Nativa (translated literally from Portuguese: California of the Native Song) is a yearly regional music festival in the state of Rio Grande do Sul, the southernmost state of Brazil.

The event first took place in 1971 and continues to be very successful to this day. The main focus of this festival is the celebration of the nativist Gaucho culture, values, world outlook, and history by way of music and song. The highest prize is the Calhandra de Ouro (Golden Lark). Competition finals are always hosted by the city of Uruguaiana.

Given its three decades-long successful history, the festival has become very popular and has received many accolades, including the prestigious official recognition, classifying it as one of the great statewide cultural institutions.

== Winning compositions ==
Nº	Year	Song title	Songwriters	Played by
I	1971	Reflexão	Colmar Duarte e Júlio da Silva Filho	Cecília Machado e Os Marupiaras
II	1972	Pedro Guará	Cláudio Boeira Garcia e José Cláudio Machado	Os Tapes
III	1973	Canto de Morte de Gaudêncio Sete Luas	Luiz de Martino Coronel|Luiz Coronel e Marco Aurélio Vasconcellos	Rosa Maria
IV	1974	Canção dos Arrozais	José Hilário Retamozzo	Riograndino Oppa e Os Jaros
V	1975	Roda Canto	Aparício Silva Rillo e Mario Barbará	Luiz Eugênio
VI	1976	Um Canto para o Dia	Ernani Amaro Oliveira	Oristela Alves e César Passarinho
VII	1977	Negro da Gaita	Gilberto Carvalho e Airton Pimentel	César Passarinho
VIII	1978	Pássaro Perdido	Gilberto Carvalho e Marco Aurélio Vasconcellos	Marco Aurélio Vasconcellos e Os Posteiros
IX	1979	Esquilador	Telmo de Lima Freitas	Edson Otto e Os Cantores dos Sete Povos
X	1980	Veterano	Antonio Augusto Ferreira|Antônio Augusto Ferreira e Everton dos Anjos Ferreira	Leopoldo Rassier e Os Serranos
XI	1981	Desgarrados	Sérgio Napp e Mario Barbará	Mario Barbará
XII	1982	Tertúlia	Jader Moreci Teixeira|Leonardo	Jader Moreci Teixeira|Leonardo e Os Serranos
XIII	1983	Guri	João Batista Machado e Júlio Machado da Silva Neto	César Passarinho
XIV	1984	O Grito dos Livres	José Fernando Gonzales	Dante Ramon Ledesma
XV	1985	Astro Aragano	Jerônimo Jardim	Jerônimo Jardim
XVI	1986	Tropeiro do Futuro	Armando Vasquez e Adão Quintana Vieira	João Quintana Vieira e Grupo Parceria
XVII	1987	Pampa Pietá	Dilan Camargo e Newton Bastos	Délcio Tavares
XVIII	1988	Toada de Mango	Mauro Ferreira e Elton Saldanha	Elton Saldanha
XIX	1989	Mandala das Esporas	Vaine Darde e Elton Saldanha	Elton Saldanha e Grupo
XX	1990	Songs from the last 20 years (special edition)
XXI	1991	Florêncio Guerra e seu Cavalo	Mauro Ferreira e Luiz Carlos Borges	João de Almeida Neto
XXII	1992	O Minuano e o Poeta	Louro Simões e Clóvis de Souza	César Passarinho
XXIII	1993	Domador dos Sesmarias	Elmo de Freitas (Carijó)	Elmo de Freitas (Carijó)
XXIV	1994	Milonga-me	Vinícius Brum	Vinícius Brum
XXV	1995	Querência	Silvio Aymone Genro e Getúlio Rodrigues	Nara Tavares
XXVI	1996	Canto e Reflexão para a Província	Sérgio Rojas	Sérgio Rojas
XXVII	1997	O Forasteiro	Vinicius Brum, Mauro Ferreiro e Luiz Carlos Borges	Luiz Marenco e Marco Aurélio Vasconcellos
XXVIII	1998	O Nada	Rodrigo Bauer e Chico Saratt	Chico Saratt
XXIX	1999	Poema Não Escrito	Tadeu Marfins e Lenin Nuñez	Maria Helena Anversa
XXX	2001	Rastros de Ausência	Adão Quevedo e Mauro Marques	Vinícius Brum
XXXI	2002	Feito o Carreto	Mauro Moraes	Pirisca Grecco
XXXII	2003	Laçador de Barro	Antônio Augusto Ferreira, Mauro Ferreira e Luiz Carlos Borges	João de Almeida Neto
XXXIII	2004	Muchas Gracias	Gujo Teixeira e Pirisca Grecco	Pirisca Grecco
XXXIV	2005	Com os pés fincados no chão	Zeca Alves, Pirisca Grecco e Ricardo Martins	Pirisca Grecco
XXXV	2007	Céu na terra, pelo rio	Tadeu Martins e Lenin Nuñez	Maurício Barcellos
XXXVI	2009	A sanga do Pedro Lira	Demétrio Xavier e Marco Aurélio Vasconcellos	Marco Aurélio Vasconcellos
XXXVII	2013	Petiço Mapa-Múndi	Rafael Ovídio da Costa Gomes, Fernando Saldanha Filho, Pedro Ribas e César Santos	César Santos
XXXVIII	2014	O homem dentro do Espelho	Martin Cesar e Pedro Guerra Pimentel	Cassiano Mendes e Pedro Guerra Pimentel
XXXIX	2015	ULBRA's Orchestra remembers all successes from previous Califórnias (special edition)
XXXX	2016	Celebration of the 45 years of the competition (special edition)
XXXX	2017	Um Homem, um Cavalo e um Cachorro	Silvio Genro	Luiz Fernando Baldez e Ricardo Tubino
	2018	Não houve por falta de recursos
XXXXI	2019	Leilão de Aperos	Flávio Saldanha e Nilton Ferreira	Flávio Saldanha e Nilton Ferreira
XXXXI	2020	Milonga de Amor Perfeito	Jaime Vaz Brasil e Zé Alexandre	Jaime Vaz Brasil e Grupo Mas Bah!

This list, up to and including the year of 1999, has been widely cited as to have appeared in an official festival publication called Livro de Poemas Oficial da XXX Califórnia da Canção Nativa.

== Presidents ==
- Henrique Dias de Freitas Lima - 1971 a 1973
- Colmar Pereira Duarte - 1974 a 1976
- Mauro Dante Aymone Lopes - 1977 a 1979
- Carlos Alberto da Rosa - 1980 a 1981
- Ricardo Pereira Duarte - 1982 a 1984
- Nelson José Pereira da Silva - 1985 a 1986
- Lourival Araújo Gonçalves - 1987 a 1989
- Mauro Dante Aymone Lopes - 1990
- Carlos Alberto da Rosa - 1991
- Luiz Machado Stabile - 1992
- José Mário Rodrigues de Freitas - 1993 a 1995
- José Antonio Marques Fagundes - 1996
- José Mário Rodrigues de Freitas - 1997 a 1998
- Lourival Araújo Gonçalves - 1999 a 2000
- Maurício Castanho Vidal - 2013
- Luiz Machado Stabile - 2014

== See also ==
- Culture in Rio Grande do Sul
- Erico Verissimo
- Ragamuffin War
- Jesuit Reductions
- Muckers
- Nheçu
- Sepé Tiaraju
- Guarani das Missões
