= Mario Pirata =

Brazilian writer (1957–2025)

Mario Pirata (August 19, 1957 – July 20, 2025) was a Brazilian poet and teacher.

== Life and career ==
Pirata was born in Porto Alegre on August 19, 1957. He studied Philosophy at PUCRS and UFRGS. Throughout his career, he published a number of books, and was awarded the Açorianos Literature Award in 2002.

In the 1970s he also worked with theater, participating in the avant-garde group Ói Nóis Aqui Traveiz, which performed on the streets. He wrote four plays for the puppet theater groups Caixa do Elefante de Porto Alegre and Entre Linhas de Novo Hamburgo.

Pirata died on July 20, 2025, at the age of 67.
