= Quadra, São Paulo =

Quadra
- Municipality
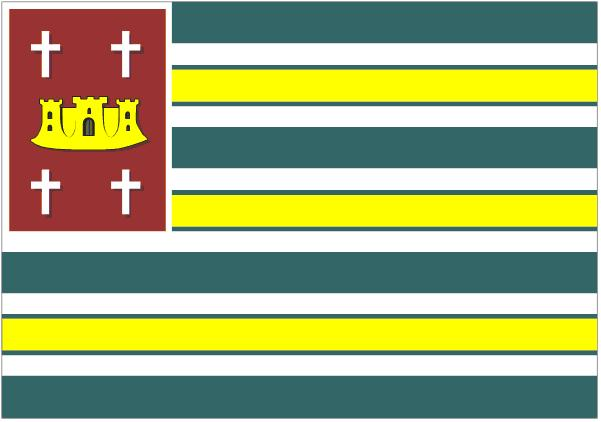
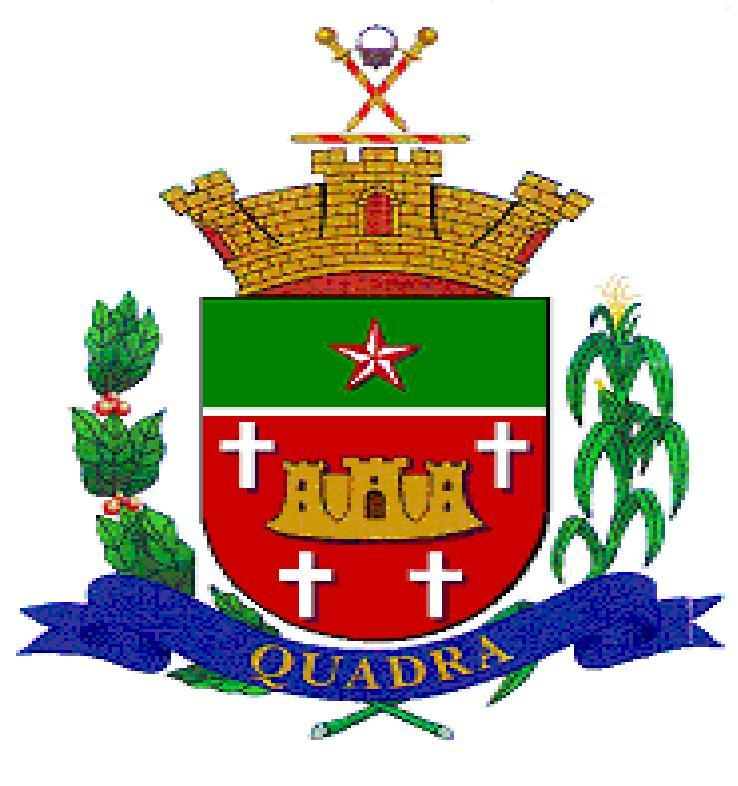
- Flag Coat of arms

- Location in São Paulo state

- Location in Brazil
- Coordinates: 23°17′56″S 48°3′18″W
- Country: Brazil
- Region: Southeast
- State: São Paulo

Government
  - Mayor: Carlos Vieira de Andrade

Area
  - Total: 205.7 km^{2} (79.4 sq mi)
- Elevation: 638 m (2,093 ft)

Population (2020)
  - Total: 3,854
  - Density: 18.74/km^{2} (48.53/sq mi)
- Time zone: UTC−3 (BRT)
- Website: www.quadra.sp.gov.br

Quadra is a municipality (município) in the state of São Paulo in Brazil. The population is 3,854 (2020 est.) in an area of 205.7 km^{2}. The elevation is 638 m.

== Media ==
In telecommunications, the city was served by Telecomunicações de São Paulo. In July 1998, this company was acquired by Telefónica, which adopted the Vivo brand in 2012. The company is currently an operator of cell phones, fixed lines, internet (fiber optics/4G) and television (satellite and cable).

== See also ==
- List of municipalities in São Paulo
