= List of 2022 box office number-one films in Brazil =

This is a list of films which placed number one at the weekend box office in Brazil for the year 2022.

== Number-one films ==
Date	Film	Box office (R$)	Notes
January 2	Spider-Man: No Way Home	R$18,000,000	
January 9	Spider-Man: No Way Home	R$20,000,000	
January 16	Spider-Man: No Way Home	R$10,000,000	
January 23	Spider-Man: No Way Home	R$5,900,000	
January 30	Spider-Man: No Way Home	R$4,590,000	
February 6	Moonfall	R$3,100,000	
February 13	Death on the Nile	R$2,280,000	
February 20	Uncharted	R$7,251,928	
February 27	Uncharted	R$4,750,000	
March 6	The Batman	R$32,201,321	
March 13	The Batman	R$20,370,000	
March 20	The Batman	R$11,800,000	
March 27	The Batman	R$7,170,000	
April 3	Morbius	R$8,940,000	
April 10	Sonic the Hedgehog 2	R$15,800,000	
April 17	Fantastic Beasts: The Secrets of Dumbledore	R$22,220,000	
April 24	Fantastic Beasts: The Secrets of Dumbledore	R$11,830,000	
May 1	Fantastic Beasts: The Secrets of Dumbledore	R$5,520,000	
May 8	Doctor Strange in the Multiverse of Madness	R$62,546,387	
May 15	Doctor Strange in the Multiverse of Madness	R$31,400,000	
May 22	Doctor Strange in the Multiverse of Madness	R$13,170,600	
May 29	Top Gun: Maverick	R$15,750,000	
June 5	Jurassic World: Dominion	R$20,500,000	
June 12	Jurassic World: Dominion	R$15,700,000	
June 19	Lightyear	R$12,020,000	
June 26	Top Gun: Maverick	R$6,205,014	
July 3	Minions: The Rise of Gru	R$16,640,000	
July 10	Thor: Love and Thunder	R$42,350,610	
July 17	Thor: Love and Thunder	R$17,748,300	
July 24	Minions: The Rise of Gru	R$11,055,560	
July 31	Minions: The Rise of Gru	R$8,063,647	
August 7	Minions: The Rise of Gru	R$2,410,000	
August 14	Minions: The Rise of Gru	R$8,602,353	
August 21	Dragon Ball Super: Super Hero	R$2,650,000	
August 28	Nope	R$3,030,000	
September 4	Nope	R$2,496,810	
September 11	Ticket to Paradise	R$2,855,803	
September 18	Orphan: First Kill	R$9,430,000	
September 25	The Woman King	R$3,058,125	
October 2	The Woman King	R$3,498,000	
October 9	Smile	R$3,530,756	
October 16	Halloween Ends	R$3,023,156	
October 23	Black Adam	R$22,900,000	
October 30	Black Adam	R$11,300,000	
November 6	Black Adam	R$10,000,000	
November 13	Black Panther: Wakanda Forever	R$29,400,000	
November 20	Black Panther: Wakanda Forever	R$18,857,380	
November 27	Black Panther: Wakanda Forever	R$7,257,499	
December 4	Black Panther: Wakanda Forever	R$6,890,904	
December 11	Black Panther: Wakanda Forever	R$5,681,869	
December 18	Avatar: The Way of Water	R$40,100,000	
December 25	Avatar: The Way of Water	R$15,400,000	

== Highest-grossing films ==
Highest-grossing films of 2022
Rank	Title	Distributor	Gross R$	Gross US$
1.	Avatar: The Way of Water	Disney	$219 960 000	$42,595,135.14
2.	Doctor Strange in the Multiverse of Madness	Disney	$169 274 000	$32,779,818.63
3.	Thor: Love and Thunder	Disney	$123 366 565	$24,701,077.01
4.	Minions: The Rise of Gru	Universal	$121 720 000	$23,571,012.23
5.	The Batman	Warner Bros.	$114 951 000	$17,087,497.02
6.	Black Panther: Wakanda Forever	Disney	$113 430 000	$21,965,658.2
7.	Top Gun: Maverick	Paramount	$110 317 380	$21,362,901.02
8.	Black Adam	Warner Bros.	$79 900 000	$15,472,591.82
9.	Jurassic World Dominion	Universal	$76 850 893	$11,161,046.25
10.	Sonic the Hedgehog 2	Paramount	$ 57 253 000	$11,087,012.51
