= José Afonso da Silva =

Brazilian jurist (1925–2025)

José Afonso da Silva (April 30, 1925 – November 25, 2025) was a Brazilian jurist, professor, and Constitutional law scholar and jurisconsult.

== Life and career ==
José Afonso da Silva was born in Pompéu on April 30, 1925. He graduated from the University of São Paulo in 1957.

He served as a prosecutor for the State of São Paulo, in addition to having been Secretary of Public Security of the State of São Paulo from 1995 to 1999. He participated as a legal advisor to the Constituent Assembly that drafted the Brazilian Federal Constitution of 1988. He taught at the Federal University of Minas Gerais and the University of São Paulo.

On October 25, 2010, he was awarded the Grand Cross of the Order of Ipiranga by the Government of the State of São Paulo. On May 28, 2016, he was awarded the title of Doctor Honoris Causa by the Brazilian Academy of Constitutional Law.

Silva died on November 25, 2025, at the age of 100.
