= Vidal Balielo =

Brazilian journalist (1944 or 1945 – 2025)

Vidal Balielo (1944 or 1945 – August 22, 2025) was a Brazilian journalist.

== Life and career ==
Maringa was a longtime television presenter, first appearing as TV Cultura de Maringá news program: Rede Globo. He was later the general director of Production at TV Cultura.

Balielo died on August 22, 2025, at the age of 80.
