= Band Brasília =

Television station in Brasília, Brazil

TV Bandeirantes Brasília (ZYP 320)
- Brasília, Federal District; Brazil
- Channels: Digital: 26 (UHF); Virtual: 4
- Branding: Band Brasília

Programming
- Affiliations: Rede Bandeirantes

Ownership
- Owner: Grupo Bandeirantes de Comunicação; (Rádio e Televisão Bandeirantes S.A.)

History
- First air date: January 4, 1987
- Former call signs: ZYA 510 (1987-2018)
- Former channel numbers: Analog: 4 (VHF, 1987-2018)

Technical information
- Licensing authority: ANATEL
- ERP: 2 kW
- Transmitter coordinates: 15°41′57.3″S 47°49′46.6″W

Links
- Public license information: Profile
- Website: bandtv.band.uol.com.br/tv/brasilia

Band Brasília (channel 4) is a Rede Bandeirantes-owned-and-operated station licensed to the city of Brasília, Brazil's federal capital. Its studios are located on Centro Empresarial João Carlos Saad, located in the Setor Bancário Sul of the city's South Wing, in the Plano Piloto administrative region, and its transmitter is located at Torre de TV Digital de Brasília, in the Lago Norte region.

== History ==
Rede Bandeirantes was formerly carried by TV Nacional, public station owned by Radiobrás, from 1977 to 1982, even producing the Brasília edition of Jornal Bandeirantes, which was fronted by Luiz Santoro and Carlos Castelo Branco in the station's studios. However, Grupo Bandeirantes de Comunicação needed its own station in the capital, which was primordial to the network's nationwide expansion project at the time, as well as being useful for coverage of the national political scene.

In 1984, one year after TV Nacional began to air Rede Manchete's programming, Rede Bandeirantes obtained and owned-and-operated station license, which initially was going to be on channel 12. However, president João Figueiredo cancelled the grant due to the expressive amount of attention that the network was giving to Diretas Já, which ended up delaying its implementation process and handed over the frequency to SBT. The change in owner affected its plans, as it had imported French equipment, which worked better on Band III channels (7 to 13). On his penultimate day of mandate, on March 13, 1985, Figueiredo called João Jorge Saad to Brasília for a meeting, showing repent, by signing a new license to the owner of the network. Grupo Bandeirantes de Comunicação almost lost it again after José Sarney's new minister of communications, Antônio Carlos Magalhães, decided to re-examine all 140 broadcasting licenses granted by the former president between October 1, 1984, e March 15, 1985. However, after an announcement issued on October 30, it was announced that the licenses of TV Bandeirantes Brasília and TVS Brasília (also affected by the decision) would be kept. After a long period of wait and several problems, the station was founded on January 4, 1987, consolidating Rede Bandeirantes' nationwide network process, becoming the third owned-and-operated station of the four commercial networks of the time (Globo, SBT, Manchete and Band) to be set up locally.

On April 6, 2015, due to the crisis that hit Band, some local programs left the schedule and nine staff were fired. With that, only Band Cidade and Band Entrevista remained as original programs.

On June 25, 2018, Os Donos da Bola DF with Bruno Mendes and Danny Pança premiered. In 2020, Band Brasília fired seven journalists with the aim of cutting costs. On August 30, 2021, Brasil Urgente DF returned to the line-up with Tonny Alves presenting, which continued until March 31, 2023, being replaced by Rimack Souto.

On September 26, 2022, Band Brasília started to air its programming in high definition. On July 24, 2023, it premiered Boa Tarde DF, with Thalyta Almeida.

== Technical information ==
Virtual channel	Digital channel	Screen	Content
4.1	26 UHF	1080i	Band Brasília/Band's main schedule

Band Brasília shut down its analog signal on VHF channel 4 on November 17, 2016, according to the official ANATEL timeline. The analog signal was switched off during Polícia 24h.

== Programming ==
In addition to relaying Band's national programming, Band Brasília currently produces the following programs:

- Boa Tarde DF: news, with Thalyta Almeida;
- Os Donos da Bola: Sports news, with Bruno Mendes and Danny Pança;
- Band Cidade: news, with Renata Dourado;
- Band Entrevista: Talk show, with Renata Dourado;
- Vem Brasília: variety, with Henia Aquino.

Former local programs:

- Agitando
- Antenados
- Art Mix
- Barra Pesada
- Beleza em Pauta
- Brasil Caipira
- Brasília Urgente DF
- Bumerangue
- Conversa de Chef
- Cozinhando com Dona Íris
- DF Acontece
- Direto de Brasília
- Direito Cidadão
- Educa, Brasil
- Fórmula Horse
- Fórmula Dog
- Jogo Aberto DF
- Jornal Local
- Kaquinho & Cumpadi Bráulio
- Maneiro
- Na Trilha da Verdade
- Papeando
- Programa Gilberto Amaral
- Rede Cidade
- Temperando a Vida
- TV Mídia
- Viver em Brasília
- Wilma Magalhães Apresenta
