= List of 2025 box office number-one films in Brazil =

This is a list of films which placed number-one at the weekend box office in Brazil during 2025.

#	Weekend end date	Film	Box office	Openings in the top ten	Ref.
1	January 5, 2025	O Auto da Compadecida 2	$2,374,014	Nosferatu #4	
2	January 12, 2025	Mufasa: The Lion King	$1,513,052	Chuck Billy and the Marvelous Guava Tree #6, Babygirl #9, Right People, Wrong Place #10	
3	January 19, 2025	Mufasa: The Lion King	$1,197,417	Wolf Man #7, MMA - Meu Melhor Amigo #10	
4	January 26, 2025	I'm Still Here	$937,213	Conclave #5, Paddington in Peru #8, Anora #9	
5	February 2, 2025	I'm Still Here	$733,000	Den of Thieves: Pantera #6, Bagman #8, The Wizard of the Emerald City #10	
6	February 9, 2025	Mufasa: The Lion King	$993,684	Companion #3, Armor #10	
7	February 16, 2025	Captain America: Brave New World	$3,467,578	Bridget Jones: Mad About the Boy #5	
8	February 23, 2025	Captain America: Brave New World	$1,730,827	Fé para o Impossível #3, Flow #4, The Brutalist #5	
9	March 2, 2025	Captain America: Brave New World	$953,396	Dog Man #3, A Complete Unknown #5, Absolution #10	
10	March 9, 2025	Captain America: Brave New World	$724,764	Mickey 17 #2, The Monkey #3, Uma Advogada Brilhante #6	
11	March 16, 2025	Vitória	$828,773	The Sloth Lane #7, Black Bag #9	
12	March 23, 2025	Snow White	$2,400,710	Jão - SuperTurnê: A Primeira e a Última Noite #4, The Alto Knights #6	
13	March 30, 2025	Snow White	$1,484,160	A Working Man #2, Novocaine #4, Câncer com Ascendente em Virgem #10	
14	April 6, 2025	A Minecraft Movie	$5,800,000	Presence #3, Strange Darling #8, One of Them Days #10	
15	April 13, 2025	A Minecraft Movie	$4,035,250	The Chosen: Last Supper #2, The Amateur #4,Drop #5,The King of Kings #7,Kaiju No. 8: Mission Recon #10	
16	April 20, 2025	A Minecraft Movie	$2,541,743	Sinners #3, In the Lost Lands #7, Warfare #9	
17	April 27, 2025	A Minecraft Movie	$1,158,591.1	The Accountant 2 #3, Star Wars: Episode III – Revenge of the Sith: 20th Anniversary #4, Until Dawn #5, Pink Floyd: Live at Pompeii #8, The Day the Earth Blew Up (#9)	
18	May 4, 2025	Thunderbolts*	$3,935,574	Homem com H #3, Love Hurts #9	
19	May 11, 2025	Thunderbolts*	$1,525,828	Karate Kid: Legends #2, The Woman in the Yard #7, The Unbreakable Boy #10	
20	May 18, 2025	Final Destination Bloodlines	$2,800,000	Hurry Up Tomorrow #7, Manas #10	
21	May 25, 2025	Lilo & Stitch	$10,995,817	Mission: Impossible - The Final Reckoning #2, Ritas #7	
22	June 1, 2025	Lilo & Stitch	$7,323,087	J-Hope Tour ‘Hope on the Stage Tour’ in Japan #4, 2025 UEFA Champions League Final #5, Locked #7, The Phoenician Scheme #10	
23	June 8, 2025	Lilo & Stitch	$4,418,261	How to Train Your Dragon #2, Ballerina #3, Colorful Stage! The Movie: A Miku Who Can't Sing #7	
24	June 15, 2025	How to Train Your Dragon	$4,296,805	The Notebook #6, Me Before You #7, June & John #9, A Star Is Born #10	
25	June 22, 2025	How to Train Your Dragon	$3,784,989	Elio #3, 28 Years Later #4, Dan Da Dan: Evil Eye #8	
26	June 29, 2025	F1	$1,786,333	M3GAN 2.0 #4, ATEEZ World Tour - Towards The Light : Will To Power #7, Miley Cyrus: Something Beautiful #10	
27	July 6, 2025	Jurassic World Rebirth	$3,554,953	Forever Young #10	
28	July 13, 2025	Superman	$5,900,000	Shadow Force #9, 2025 FIFA Club World Cup final #10	
29	July 20, 2025	Superman	$3,049,504	Smurfs #3, I Know What You Did Last Summer #5, Cazuza: Boas Novas #10	
30	July 27, 2025	The Fantastic Four: First Steps	$5,058,115	Last Breath #9, The Ritual #10	
31	August 3, 2025	The Fantastic Four: First Steps	$2,578,232	Materialists #3	
32	August 10, 2025	The Fantastic Four: First Steps	$1,697,769	Weapons #2, Freakier Friday #3, RunSeokjin Ep. Tour in Amsterdam #6, Dracula #8	
33	August 17, 2025	The Fantastic Four: First Steps	$900,386	The Bad Guys 2 #3, The Naked Gun #5, Together #6	
34	August 24, 2025	The Fantastic Four: First Steps	$541,529	Bring Her Back #4, Nobody 2 #8, Uma Mulher sem Filtro #10	
35	August 31, 2025	The Fantastic Four: First Steps	$799,092	The Roses #7, Caught Stealing #8, Rosario #9	
36	September 7, 2025	The Conjuring: Last Rites	$10,200,000	O Rei da Feira #4, The Life of Chuck #6	
37	September 14, 2025	Demon Slayer: Kimetsu no Yaiba – The Movie: Infinity Castle	$4,847,122	Toy Story: 30th Anniversary #3, A Sogra Perfeita 2 #4,Downton Abbey: The Grand Finale #7	
38	September 21, 2025	The Conjuring: Last Rites	$1,284,210	A Big Bold Beautiful Journey #3, The Long Walk #4, Dangerous Animals #5	
39	September 28, 2025	The Conjuring: Last Rites	$689,286	One Battle After Another #2, Night of the Zoopocalypse #4, 2017 BTS Live Trilogy Episode III: The Wings Tour the Final - Remastered #6, Pets on a Train #8, Ne Zha 2 #10	
40	October 5, 2025	The Conjuring: Last Rites	$468,125	The Smashing Machine #4, Avatar: The Way of Water #5, The Strangers: Chapter 2 #6, BTS World Tour Love Yourself in Seoul #7, BTS 2021 MUSTER: SOWOOZOO #8, Malês (filme) #9	
41	October 12, 2025	Tron: Ares	$1,038,735	Gabby's Dollhouse: The Movie #2, Perrengue Chique, #3	
42	October 19, 2025	Black Phone 2	$1,161,204	Roofman #5, Eu e Meu Avô Nihonjin #10	
43	October 26, 2025	Black Phone 2	$740,038	Regretting You #2, Chainsaw Man – The Movie: Reze Arc #3, Mauricio de Sousa: O Filme #7, Stitch Head #8, The Secret Agent #9, The Ugly Stepsister #10	
44	November 2, 2025	Black Phone 2	$548,115	Corpse Bride: 20th Anniversary #3, A Paw Patrol Christmas #5, Shelby Oaks #6, Good Boy #8	
45	November 9, 2025	The Secret Agent	$1,232,467	Predator: Badlands #2, Good Fortune #7, Grand Prix of Europe #8, Twice: One in a Mill1on #10	
46	November 16, 2025	Now You See Me: Now You Don't	$1,816,326	Harry Potter and the Goblet of Fire: 20th Anniversary #2, Eddington #10	
47	November 23, 2025	Wicked: For Good	$2,052,078	The Running Man #4, Jujutsu Kaisen: Execution #5, Homo Argentum #10	
48	November 30, 2025	Zootopia 2	$3,510,652	Bugonia #5, Die My Love #8, Mãe Fora da Caixa #10	
49	December 7, 2025	Five Nights at Freddy's 2	$2,990,163	D.P.A. 4: O Fantástico Reino de Ondion #6, Eternity #7, It Was Just an Accident #9, Tin Soldier #10	
50	December 14, 2025	Zootopia 2	$2,334,301	Silent Night, Deadly Night #7, Pride and Prejudice: 20th Anniversary #8, Perfeitos Desconhecidos #9, Light of the World #10	
51	December 21, 2025	Avatar: Fire and Ash	$5,628,140	The Housemaid #4	
52	December 28, 2025	Avatar: Fire and Ash	$3,485,707	Anaconda #3, The SpongeBob Movie: Search for SquarePants #4, Sentimental Value #8, RunSeokjin Ep. Tour The Movie #9	

== Highest-grossing films ==
Highest-grossing films of 2025 (In-year releases)
Rank	Title	Distributor	Domestic gross
1	Lilo & Stitch	Walt Disney Studios Motion Pictures	$38,273,252
2	Zootopia 2	Walt Disney Studios Motion Pictures	$28,178,653
3	Avatar: Fire and Ash	Walt Disney Studios Motion Pictures	$26,415,149
4	How to Train Your Dragon	Universal Studios	$22,147,840
5	A Minecraft Movie	Warner Bros.	$19,200,000
6	The Housemaid	Paris Filmes	$17,992,578
7	The Conjuring: Last Rites	Warner Bros.	$17,800,000
8	Superman	Warner Bros.	$16,800,000
9	The Fantastic Four: First Steps	Walt Disney Studios Motion Pictures	$15,555,347
10	Jurassic World: Rebirth	Universal Pictures International	$11,989,504

== See also ==
- List of 2024 box office number-one films in Brazil
- 2025 in Brazil

Preceded by 2024 Box office number-one films	Box office number-one films 2025	Succeeded by 2026 Box office number-one films
