= Airton Garcia =

Brazilian politician (1949–2025)

Airton Garcia Ferreira (October 17, 1949 – September 28, 2025) was a Brazilian politician.

== Life and career ==
Garcia was born in São Carlos on October 17, 1949. He was a member of the Progressistas, with which he was elected state deputy in 2014, and mayor of São Carlos for the first time in 2016 for the 2017–2020 term and reelected in 2020 for the 2021–2024 term.

Garcia died on September 28, 2025, at the age of 75.

Political offices
| Preceded by Paulo Altomani | Mayor of São Carlos; 2017–2024 | Succeeded by Netto Donato |
