= Ariovaldo Umbelino de Oliveira =

Brazilian writer and geographer (1947–2025)

Ariovaldo Umbelino de Oliveira (1947 – August 2, 2025) was a Brazilian writer, academic and geographer.

== Life and career ==
Ariovaldo Umbelino de Oliveira achieved a PhD in Geography and was a professor at the Faculty of Philosophy, Languages and Literature, and Human Sciences, Department of Human Geography, at the University of São Paulo. He specialized in the area of Agrarian Geography.

Throughout his life, he published a number of books related to the geography of Brazil and abroad.

In 1997, he was awarded the Jabuti Prize for Literature by the Brazilian Book Chamber.

De Oliveira died in São Paulo on August 2, 2025, at the age of 78.
