= Paulo Frateschi =

Brazilian politician (1950–2025)

Paulo Frateschi (1950 – November 6, 2025) was a Brazilian politician.

== Life and career ==
Frateschi was born in 1950, and was the brother of actor and theater director Celso Frateschi. In 1969, he was arrested by the military due to being a member of the National Liberation Action (ALN), fighting against the military dictatorship in Brazil.

He served as a state deputy and was chairman of the Workers' Party.

On November 6, 2025, Frateschi died after being stabbed by his son, Francisco, in São Paulo. He was 75.
