= Rosa Gauditano =

Brazilian photographer (1955–2025)

Rosa Jandira Gauditano (April 3, 1955 – August 7, 2025) was a Brazilian photographer known for her work documenting the situation of marginalized people in Brazil since the 1970s, such as LGBT and indigenous populations.

== Life and career ==
Before becoming a photographer, Rosa studied journalism at Faculdade Cásper Líbero (FCL) in 1975. Two years later, in 1977, she started working as a photographer for newspapers and magazines, including the alternative press newspaper Versus. Her work at this time focused on the record of the mobilization of workers in the ABC region of São Paulo, which began in 1977 and lasted for another four years. She became the photo editor during her time at Versus.

In 1978 she took a course in Photography at the Armando Alvares Penteado Foundation (FAAP), and another in 1980 at FCL, but did not complete the latter. Between 1980 and 1981, Gauditano worked as a guest professor of photojournalism at the Pontifical Catholic University of São Paulo (PUC-SP). In 1984 she worked for the newspaper Folha de S.Paulo, and between 1985 and 1986 for Veja magazine. In 1987 she founded her own photography agency, Fotograma Fotojornalismo e Documentação, together with Ed Viggiani and Emidio Luisi, through which she began to work autonomously.

In 1989, Rosa had her first contact with indigenous peoples in Pará, and then began to document the situation of indigenous peoples in Brazil, as well as their customs, including the Carajás, Kayapo, Tucano, Yanomamis, Xavantes, Guarani and Pancarus.

Rosa died from a heart attack on August 7, 2025, at the age of 70.
