= Vila Kennedy =

Neighborhood in Rio de Janeiro

Coordinates: 22°51′22″S 43°29′10″W

Vila Kennedy is a neighborhood and favela in the western zone of Rio de Janeiro. It is located on the fringes of Avenida Brasil. Its streets have the names of African and Asian countries, as well as musicians. Before being an official neighborhood it was a part of Bangu before being separated into its own neighborhood by law in July 2017.
