= Deaths in May 2025 =

The following is a list of notable deaths in May 2025.

Entries for each day are listed alphabetically by surname. A typical entry lists information in the following sequence:

- Name, age, country of citizenship at birth, subsequent country of citizenship (if applicable), reason for notability, cause of death (if known), and reference.

== May 2025 ==
=== 1 ===
- Sue Anderson, 70, American pianist and theatre conductor, cancer.
- Victor Aviat, 42, French oboist and conductor, brain tumor.
- Bob Brockie, 93, New Zealand biologist, cartoonist and columnist.
- Ruth Buzzi, 88, American comedian (Rowan & Martin's Laugh-In) and actress (Sesame Street, That Girl), complications from a stroke and Alzheimer's disease.
- Tania Marie Caringi, 38, American-Italian model.
- Nana Caymmi, 84, Brazilian singer, multiple organ failure.
- Mudabbir Hossain Chowdhury, 78, Bangladeshi police officer, inspector general (2001–2003).
- Ricky Davao, 63, Filipino actor (Ang Padrino, Kung Aagawin Mo ang Lahat sa Akin) and television director (!Oka Tokat), cancer.
- Irma Moen Eriksen, 90, Norwegian politician, deputy representative (1981–1985).
- Tivi Etok, 95–96, Canadian illustrator and printmaker.
- Ingolf Gabold, 83, Danish composer.
- Antoni Garrallà, 81, Andorran politician and hotelier, mayor of La Massana (1995–2003) and deputy general syndic of the General Council (1985–1989).
- Jackson Guice, 63, American comic book artist (Superman, Captain America), co-creator of Apocalypse, pneumonia.
- Jeffrey Hutchinson, 62, American convicted murderer, execution by lethal injection.
- Larry Johnson, 70, American basketball player (Buffalo Braves).
- Irina Kostrova, 102, Russian actress.
- Barnabás Lenkovics, 74, Hungarian jurist, president of the Constitutional Court (2015–2016).
- Ezio Leonardi, 95, Italian politician, senator (1987–1994) and mayor of Novara (1971–1978).
- Lidwine, 64, French comic book author and illustrator.
- Manolo el del Bombo, 76, Spanish football fan (Valencia, national team), respiratory failure.
- Evangeline Montgomery, 94, American sculptor and art curator.
- Peter Nixon, 97, Australian politician, MP (1961–1983), minister for the interior (1967–1971) and primary industry (1979–1983).
- Carole Ormaca, 88, American Olympic skater (1956).
- Fadıl Öztürk, 69–70, Turkish writer and poet. (death announced on this date)
- George William Penrose, Lord Penrose, 86, Scottish judge, member of the Court of Session.
- Andrejs Prohorenkovs, 48, Latvian footballer (Maccabi Tel Aviv, Liepājas Metalurgs, national team), cancer.
- Charley Scalies, 84, American actor (The Wire, The Sopranos, Liberty Heights).
- Jill Sobule, 66, American singer-songwriter ("I Kissed a Girl", "Supermodel"), house fire.
- Starcadian, 43–44, American synthwave musician, traffic collision.
- Marie Vaislic, 94, French Holocaust survivor and writer.
- Girija Vyas, 78, Indian politician, minister of housing (2013–2014) and MP (1991–2004), injuries sustained in a fire.
- Tashi Wangdi, 78, Tibetan diplomat and politician.
- David Woodfield, 81, English football player (Wolverhampton Wanderers, Watford) and manager (Sabah).
- Ali Yachkaschi, 86, Iranian environmentalist.

=== 2 ===
- Alfred Kwame Agbesi, 70, Ghanaian politician, MP (2005–2017).
- Michael Alaimo, 86, American actor (The China Syndrome, Billy, Space Jam).
- Alexandra Bellow, 89, Romanian-American mathematician.
- Dara Birnbaum, 78, American video artist (Technology/Transformation: Wonder Woman) and installation artist.
- Karel Bláha, 77, Czech singer.
- Lisa Brown-Miller, 58, American ice hockey player, Olympic champion (1998).
- Philippe Capdenat, 90, French composer and academic teacher.
- Jorge Iván Castaño Rubio, 89, Colombian Roman Catholic prelate, bishop of Quibdó (1983–2001) and auxiliary bishop of Medellín (2001–2010).
- Kathleen Corrigan, 80, American Olympic gymnast (1964).
- Jean-François Davy, 79, French film director (Bananes mécaniques, Surprise Sock) and producer.
- Jim Dent, 85, American golfer.
- Esteban Escudero, 79, Spanish Roman Catholic prelate and theologian, bishop of Palencia (2010–2015) and auxiliary bishop of Valencia (2000–2010, 2015–2021).
- Charlotte Fosgate, 17, American transgender teenager.
- Harry Fritz, 74, American-Canadian tennis player.
- Alfredo Felipe Fuentes, 75, Cuban journalist. (death announced on this date)
- Dave Gorman, 70, Canadian ice hockey player (Atlanta Flames).
- Ron Haun, 82, American college football coach (Dixie State).
- Fidel Herrera Beltrán, 76, Mexican politician, governor of Veracruz (2004–2010), senator (2000–2004), and four-time deputy.
- Tom Hidley, 93, American audio engineer.
- Doug Hinds, 91, American politician, member of the South Carolina Senate.
- Hữu Ngọc, 106, Vietnamese writer and journalist.
- Sir Bob Jones, 85, New Zealand property investor and politician.
- Adnan Kassar, 94, Lebanese banker and politician, minister of economy and trade (2004–2005).
- Parma Nand, 63, New Zealand surgeon
- George Ryan, 91, American politician, governor (1999–2003), secretary of state (1991–1999) and lieutenant governor of Illinois (1983–1991).
- Robert B. Shapiro, 86, American businessman (Monsanto, G.D. Searle, LLC).
- Jim Smith, 70, American animator (The Ren & Stimpy Show, Samurai Jack), co-founder of Spümcø, heart attack.
- José Torres, 65, American educator, CEO of Chicago Public Schools (2021).

=== 3 ===
- Humaira Ali, 65, Pakistani actress (Jab We Wed, Sammi).
- Pierre Audi, 67, French-Lebanese theatre director and artistic director.
- John Henry Bostwick, 86, Bahamian politician, president of the Senate of Bahamas (1992–2002).
- Greg Cannom, 73, American makeup artist (Bram Stoker's Dracula, Mrs. Doubtfire, The Curious Case of Benjamin Button), four-time Oscar winner.
- Peter Coade, 83, Canadian meteorologist and television weather reporter (Information Morning).
- Ruth A. Davis, 81, American diplomat, director general of the Foreign Service (2001–2003), pneumonia.
- Alv Egeland, 93, Norwegian physicist.
- Jake Findlay, 70, Scottish footballer (Aston Villa, Luton Town, Swindon Town).
- Lino Gutierrez, 74, American diplomat, ambassador to Nicaragua (1996–1999), ambassador to Argentina (2003–2006).
- Elsbeth Hamilton, 104, Czechoslovak-born British radio operator and Women's Auxiliary Air Force veteran.
- Stephen Harmelin, 85, American lawyer and speechwriter, White House director of speechwriting (1964–1965), complications from Parkinson's disease.
- Lori Healey, 65, American urban planner, pancreatic cancer.
- Pedro Hidalgo, 88–89, Chilean politician, minister of agriculture (1973).
- Harold Horton, 85, American football player and coach (Arkansas Razorbacks).
- Sarah Kramer, 56, Canadian vegan cookbook author, glioblastoma.
- Sholom Lipskar, 78, Uzbek-born American Orthodox rabbi and community leader.
- Sajid Mir, 86, Pakistani politician and Islamic scholar, senator (1994–1999, 2003–2025) and amir of Jamiat Ahle Hadith (since 1987), heart attack.
- Walid Mostafa, 53, Egyptian media executive, founder of Youm7.
- Sırrı Süreyya Önder, 62, Turkish actor, film director, and politician, member (2011–2018, since 2023) and deputy speaker (since 2023) of the GNAT, multiple organ failure.
- Steve Pepoon, 68, American television writer (ALF, Get a Life, The Wild Thornberrys).
- Ian Polmear, 97, Australian metallurgist.
- James F. Rooney, 89, American politician, member of the Wisconsin State Assembly (1973–1985).
- Rajiv Ruparelia, 35, Ugandan businessman and rally driver, traffic collision.
- Shōzō Satō, 91, Japanese-born American artist and theatre director, founder and director of Japan House.
- Merrill Singer, 74, American medical anthropologist.
- Sivananda, Indian yoga teacher and longevity claimant, cardiac arrest.
- Karsten Stolz, 60, German Olympic shot putter (1984).
- Lorraine Taylor, 63, New Zealand footballer (national team).
- Otis Thornton, 79, American baseball player (Houston Astros).
- Carolyn Tyler Guidry, 87, American bishop.
- Steve Uzelac, 72, English footballer (Doncaster Rovers, Stockport County, Preston North End).
- Paul Van Hoeydonck, 99, Belgian artist (Fallen Astronaut).
- Glenn Wasicuna, 74, American Dakota elder.
- Sylwester Wilczek, 88, Polish Olympic ice hockey player (1964).
- David Young, 88, American poet, complications from Parkinson's disease.

=== 4 ===
- Julia Alexander, 57–58, American art historian and curator, heart attack.
- Michael Allaby, 91, British author and actor (Doctor Who, Crane, Maigret).
- Judith Hope Blau, 87, American artist, congestive heart failure.
- David Cope, 83, American author, composer and scientist, congestive heart failure.
- John Davis, 101, British paediatrician.
- Bruce L. Douglas, 99, American politician, member of the Illinois House of Representatives (1971–1974).
- Donald Dwight, 94, American politician and newspaper executive, lieutenant governor of Massachusetts (1971–1975).
- André Foucher, 91, French racing cyclist.
- André Gounelle, 91, French Protestant theologian, pastor, and academic.
- Jean-Claude Hamel, 94, French Olympic modern pentathlete (1956).
- Hsu Li-nung, 106, Taiwanese military officer, minister of the Veterans Affairs Council (1987–1993).
- Sean Hughes, 83, British orthopaedic surgeon.
- Billie Irwin, 82, New Zealand netball player (national team).
- David Karako, 80, Israeli football player (Maccabi Tel Aviv, national team) and manager (Hapoel Yehud).
- Guylaine Lanctôt, 84, Canadian phlebologist and anti-vaccine activist.
- Chris Leach, 83, Canadian Olympic rower (1960, 1964).
- Marianne, Princess zu Sayn-Wittgenstein-Sayn, 105, German aristocrat and photographer.
- Yolanda Consuegra Martínez, 84, Salvadoran writer.
- Jochen Mass, 78, German racing driver (Formula One), complications from a stroke.
- Peter McParland, 91, Northern Irish football player (Aston Villa, national team) and manager (Glentoran).
- Roger Meï, 90, French politician, member of the National Assembly (1996–2002).
- Petros Molyviatis, 96, Greek politician, minister of foreign affairs (2004–2006, 2012, 2015), complications from respiratory failure.
- Uno Piir, 95, Estonian football player (Tallinna Kalev) and manager (Tallinna Sadam, national team).
- Barry Preedom, 84, American physicist.
- K. V. Rabiya, 59, Indian social worker and literacy activist.
- Abdur Razzaq, 75, Bangladeshi lawyer.
- Rafael Rullán, 73, Spanish basketball player (Real Madrid, Collado Villalba, national team).
- Øyvind Thorsen, 81, Norwegian writer.
- Dennis Tipping, 85, Australian Olympic sprinter (1960).
- Peter Toyfl, 83, Austrian Olympic speed skater (1964).
- Sonni Gwanle Tyoden, 74, Nigerian politician, deputy governor of Plateau State (2015–2023).
- Ghulam Mohammad Vastanvi, 75, Indian Islamic scholar, vice-chancellor of Darul Uloom Deoband (2011).
- Gerald Thomas Walsh, 83, American Roman Catholic prelate, auxiliary bishop of New York (2004–2017).
- Reinhard Wolschina, 72, German composer.
- Tom Youngs, 45, English footballer (Cambridge United, Northampton Town, Bury), complications from multiple sclerosis.

=== 5 ===
- May Abrahamse, 94, South African soprano (Eoan Group).
- James Baker, 71, Australian rock drummer (The Scientists, Beasts of Bourbon, The Dubrovniks), cancer.
- José Ángel de la Casa, 74, Spanish journalist and sports commentator, complications from Parkinson's disease and pneumonia.
- Sunney Chan, 88, American biophysical chemist.
- Luis Galván, 77, Argentine footballer (Talleres de Córdoba, national team), world champion (1978), complications from pneumonia.
- Revaz Gamkrelidze, 98, Georgian mathematician.
- Raniero Gnoli, 95, Italian orientalist, Indologist, and religious historian.
- Naeem Issa, 92, Egyptian actor, pneumonia.
- Pavel Kachkayev, 73, Russian politician, MP (since 2011), cardiac arrest.
- Race Mathews, 90, Australian politician, MP (1972–1975) and Victoria MLA (1979–1992), complications from Alzheimer's disease.
- Giuseppe Moioli, 97, Italian rower, Olympic champion (1948).
- Joan O'Brien, 89, American actress (It Happened at the World's Fair, Operation Petticoat, Get Yourself a College Girl).
- U Oo Hla Saw, 71, Burmese politician and poet.
- Squire Parsons, 77, American Southern gospel singer-songwriter, heart attack.
- Bendik Rugaas, 82, Norwegian librarian and politician.
- Tracy Sorensen, 61, Australian novelist and academic (The Lucky Galah).
- John Edd Thompson, 82, American meteorologist (WALA-TV).
- Doug Turner, 93, British-American sound engineer (The X-Files, The Hijacking of the Achille Lauro, Deliverance), Emmy winner (1996).
- Wifiskeleton, 21, American singer, drug overdose.
- Florian Willet, 47, German author and pro-euthanasia activist, assisted suicide.

=== 6 ===
- Rinaldo Bellomo, 68–69, Italian-born Australian intensivist.
- André Berland, 84, French historian and biographer.
- Carl Crabtree, 72, American politician, member of the Idaho Senate (2016–2022), brain cancer.
- Ovide Doiron, 84, Canadian racing driver.
- Terence Etherton, Baron Etherton, 73, British judge and politician, Master of the Rolls (2016–2021), chancellor of the High Court (2013–2016), and member of the House of Lords (since 2021).
- Stephen Fabian, 95, American painter.
- Gerda Fassel, 83, Austrian sculptor.
- Iain Finlay, 89, Australian author and journalist (Beyond 2000), euthanasia.
- James Foley, 71, American film director (Glengarry Glen Ross, Who's That Girl, Fifty Shades Darker), brain cancer.
- Hammond Furlonge, 90, Trinidadian cricketer (West Indies).
- Peter Goodchild, 85, British television editor (Q.E.D.).
- Kaqusha Jashari, 78, Kosovan politician, president of the Executive Council of SAP Kosovo (1987–1989).
- Lola Liivat, 96, Estonian abstract painter.
- Barry B. Longyear, 82, American author, (Sea of Glass, The Enemy Papers, Elephant Song).
- Luigi Lopez, 77, Italian singer and composer.
- Vakhtang Machavariani, 74, Georgian composer and conductor.
- Bill McCaw, 97, New Zealand rugby union player (Southland, national team).
- Barbara McIntire, 90, American amateur golfer.
- Pradeep Nepal, 71, Nepalese politician, minister of information (1994–1995), complications from Parkinson's disease.
- Joseph Nye, 88, American political scientist (The Paradox of American Power), chair of the NIC (1993–1994) and ASD (ISA) (1994–1995).
- Fakhri Odeh, 84, Kuwaiti actor.
- Sugavasi Palakondrayudu, 78, Indian politician, MP (1984–1989) and Andhra Pradesh MLA (1978–1985, 1999–2009).
- Alamuddin Dimyati Rois, 44, Indonesian politician, MP (2009–2024), traffic collision.
- Valeriy Shevchuk, 85, Ukrainian writer.
- Viktor Talanov, 74, Russian politician, MP (1993–1995).
- Maurice Vile, 97, British political scientist.
- William Watherston, 92, Scottish rugby union player (national team).

=== 7 ===
- Joe Don Baker, 89, American actor (GoldenEye, Walking Tall, Cape Fear), lung cancer.
- Frank Caprice, 63, Canadian ice hockey player (Vancouver Canucks).
- Raúl Celis López, 70, Peruvian journalist, shot.
- Ronald Corp, 74, British composer, conductor and Anglican priest.
- Joop van Daele, 77, Dutch football player (Feyenoord, Fortuna Sittard) and manager (Excelsior).
- Mykola Fedoruk, 71, Ukrainian politician, mayor of Chernivtsi (1994–2011), deputy (2012–2019).
- Ernesto Fernandes, 79, Timorese politician, MP (2017–2023).
- Lynn Fuchs, 75, American educational psychologist.
- Alexey Gogua, 93, Abkhaz writer.
- DJ Hazel, 44, Polish DJ and music producer.
- Nate Holden, 95, American politician, member of the California Senate (1974–1978) and Los Angeles City Council (1987–2003).
- Otto Homlung, 81, Norwegian theatre producer and director, director of the Trøndelag Teater (1984–1989, 2005–2009) and Det Norske Teatret (1990–1997).
- Frank Johnson, 82, American baseball player (San Francisco Giants).
- Lothar Kolditz, 95, German chemist and politician, member of the State Council of East Germany (1982–1990) and the Volkskammer (1986–1990).
- Heikki Laine, 88, Finnish Olympic rower (1960).
- Matthew Meadows, 87, American politician and educator, member of the Florida Senate (1992–1998) and Florida House of Representatives (2000–2008).
- Cleopa Msuya, 94, Tanzanian politician, prime minister (1980–1983, 1994–1995) and first vice president (1990–1995), heart failure.
- Christián Muñoz Ortega, 65, Chilean sport shooter and pilot, plane crash.
- Saleem Nazim, 70, Pakistani field hockey player, Olympic bronze medallist (1976).
- Rosanna Norton, 80, American costume designer (Tron, Carrie, Airplane!), bladder cancer.
- Anthony Nunn, 97, British field hockey player, Olympic bronze medallist (1952).
- Jacob Palis, 85, Brazilian mathematician.
- Enrico Paolini, 80, Italian racing cyclist.
- Aʻeau Peniamina, 82, Samoan politician, member (1985–1991, 2001–2021) and speaker (1988–1991) of the Legislative Assembly. (death announced on this date)
- Hannes Primus, 48, Austrian politician, member of the Carinthian Landtag (2013–2018).
- Chris Rabjohn, 80, English footballer (Doncaster Rovers, Rotherham United).
- Angelo Rinaldi, 84, French writer and literary critic, member of the Académie Française.
- André Rouillé, 77, French historian and theorist of photography.
- Jim Spenst, 99, Canadian World War II veteran.
- Paquita Tomàs, 81, Spanish cook and television host.
- Madhav Vaze, 85, Indian actor (Shyamchi Aai, 3 Idiots, Dear Zindagi).
- Bob White, 86, American football player (OSU, Houston Oilers).
- Xatar, 43, Iranian-born German rapper.

=== 8 ===
- Héctor Aizpuro, 84, Mexican Olympic basketball player (1960).
- Jiří Bartoška, 78, Czech actor (All My Loved Ones, Tiger Theory), president of the Karlovy Vary International Film Festival.
- Amay Bisaya, 67, Filipino actor (Manila Kingpin: The Asiong Salonga Story, Ang Panday 2, Pepeng Kuryente: Man with a Thousand Volts).
- Charlie Buttons, 80, American Jewish community representative.
- Marco Causi, 68, Italian politician, deputy (2008–2018).
- Frances Crampton, 79, Australian gymnastics coach.
- Amos Elegbe, 78, Beninese academic and politician, MNA (1991–1995).
- Carlos Ferrari, 93, Argentine-Puerto Rican playwright and theatrical director.
- Oliviero Garlini, 68, Italian footballer (Cesena, Inter Milan, Atalanta).
- Hervé de La Martinière, 78, French businessman and publisher, founder of La Martinière Groupe.
- Chet Lemon, 70, American baseball player (Chicago White Sox, Detroit Tigers), World Series champion (1984), complications from polycythemia vera.
- Alphonso Lingis, 91, American philosopher.
- Simon Mann, 72, British mercenary, heart attack.
- Christián Muñoz Ortega, 65, Chilean Olympic sport shooter, plane crash.
- Andrew Norfolk, 60, British investigative reporter (The Times), enquired into the Rotherham child sexual exploitation scandal.
- Johnny Parth, 95, Austrian record producer and musician.
- Mary Pérez de Marranzini, 98, Dominican philanthropist.
- Elizabeth Pochoda, 83, American journalist.
- Qiu Xigui, 89, Chinese paleographer.
- Josaia Raisuqe, 30, Fijian rugby union footballer (Stade Français, Nevers, Fiji 7s), traffic collision.
- B. Raji Reddy, 80, Indian politician, Andhra Pradesh MLA (2009–2014).
- Enea Riboldi, 70, Italian cartoonist and illustrator.
- Dan Seavey, 87, American musher.
- Eddie Sheldrake, 98, American basketball player (UCLA Bruins) and restaurateur.
- David Souter, 85, American jurist, associate justice of the U.S. Supreme Court (1990–2009).
- Kikuo Wada, 74, Japanese wrestler, Olympic silver medallist (1972).
- Yaqob Beyene, 89, Ethiopian linguist and academic.
- Yun Humyong, 79, South Korean poet.
- Miloš Zapletal, 95, Czech writer, pedagogue and translator.

=== 9 ===
- Nadja Abd el Farrag, 60, German reality television participant and singer, multiple organ failure.
- Azmun Jaafar, 66, Indonesian civil servant and politician, regent of Pelalawan (2001–2008).
- Giuseppe Basini, 78, Italian politician, senator (1996–2001), deputy (2018–2022).
- Bo Bjelfvenstam, 101, Swedish actor, film director and author.
- Wade Blanchard, 66, Canadian curler.
- Ashour Bourashed, Libyan politician and diplomat.
- Judie English, 77, British archaelogist.
- Sir Tom Farmer, 84, British car servicing executive, founder and CEO (1971–2002) of Kwik Fit.
- Stewart Francke, 66, American singer-songwriter, complications from a stroke.
- Lynn Freed, 79, South African-born American writer, lymphoma.
- Samuel French, 45, American actor (Killers of the Flower Moon, Fear the Walking Dead), cancer.
- Margot Friedländer, 103, German Holocaust survivor and public speaker.
- Douglas Gibson, 82, South African diplomat and politician, MNA (1994–2008).
- Fred Graham, 96, New Zealand rugby union player (New Zealand Māori) and artist (Kaitiaki), AFNZ Icon (since 2018).
- Lester Hyman, 93, American attorney and writer.
- Mark Jabalé, 91, Welsh Roman Catholic prelate, bishop coadjutor (2000–2001) and bishop (2001–2008) of Menevia.
- Sahib Khazal, 82, Iraqi football player (Al-Quwa Al-Jawiya, national team) and manager (Al-Quwa Al-Jawiya).
- Kim Yeong-hyeon, 70, South Korean poet and novelist.
- Betty Krawczyk, 96, American-Canadian author and environmental activist.
- Dragan Labović, 38, Serbian basketball player (FMP, BC Nokia, national team), heart attack.
- Régent Lacoursière, 90, Canadian swimmer.
- Bob Lemieux, 80, Canadian ice hockey player (Oakland Seals, Muskegon Zephyrs, Vancouver Canucks) and coach.
- Milorad Mirčić, 69, Serbian politician, minister of diaspora (1998–2000), mayor of Novi Sad (1993–1994), and MP (1993–2007, 2016–2020).
- Serge Mongeau, 88, Canadian writer and politician.
- Peter Morwood, 68, Irish novelist (The Dragon Lord).
- Gordon Nuttall, 71, Australian politician, Queensland MLA (1992–2006), kidney cancer.
- Lydia Nyati-Ramahobo, 67, Botswanan linguistic scholar.
- Ana Pellicer, 79, Mexican sculptor, artisan, and jewellery maker. (death announced on this date)
- Johnny Rodriguez, 73, American country singer ("You Always Come Back (To Hurting Me)", "Pass Me By (If You're Only Passing Through)").
- Francisco Rotunno, 49, Chilean footballer (Coquimbo Unido, Cobresal, Persekabpas Pasuruan).
- Joan de Sagarra, 86, Spanish writer and journalist.
- John Stachel, 97, American physicist.
- John H. Thompson, 73, American statistician, director of the U.S. Census Bureau (2013–2017).
- Gianni Vasino, 88, Italian journalist (90º minuto).

=== 10 ===
- Mustafa Zaman Abbasi, 88, Bangladeshi musicologist.
- Subbanna Ayyappan, 69, Indian aquaculture scientist (Blue Revolution), drowned.
- Matthew Best, 68, English conductor and singer, cancer.
- Nancy Blaik, 88, British charity fundraiser.
- Ghee Bowman, 73, British historian.
- Bob Cowper, 84, Australian cricketer (Victoria, Western Australia, national team).
- Douglas Craig, 95, British football executive, chairman of York City (1991–2002).
- Neville Dilkes, 94, English conductor and organist.
- Charlotte Dravet, 88, French paediatric psychiatrist and epileptologist.
- Gerry Francis, 91, English footballer (Tonbridge Angels, Leeds United, York City).
- John Gale, 95, British theatrical producer and artistic director.
- Nina Grebeshkova, 94, Russian actress (The Diamond Arm, Sportloto-82, Tears Were Falling).
- David Hay, 91, Australian politician, New South Wales MLA (1984–1991) and three-time mayor of Manly.
- Kafon, 42, Tunisian rapper, heart attack.
- Gerald Kaufman, 92, American politician, member of the Pennsylvania House of Representatives (1967–1968, 1969–1972).
- Kaleria Kislova, 99, Russian television director (Vremya).
- Koyo Kouoh, 57, Cameroonian-born Swiss museum curator (Zeitz MOCAA), cancer.
- William Luers, 95, American diplomat, president of the Metropolitan Museum of Art (1986–1999).
- Aldo Maniacco, 90, Canadian-Italian Olympic ice hockey player (1956).
- Arjun Menon, 48, Singaporean cricket player (national team) and coach (Chile, Malawi).
- Wolfgang Rausch, 78, German footballer (1. FC Köln, Kickers Offenbach, Bayern Munich).
- John Root, 87, American politician, member of the New Hampshire House of Representatives (1996–1998).
- Ramanand Prasad Singh, 83–84, Indian politician, Bihar MLA (2004–2010, 2015–2020).
- Johnnie Walls, 80, American lawyer and politician, member of the Mississippi State Senate (1993–2011).

=== 11 ===
- Hemaben Acharya, 91, Indian politician, Gujarat MLA (1965–1970).
- Chris Ballingall, 92, American baseball player (Muskegon Belles, Kalamazoo Lassies).
- John Barbato, 90, American mobster (Genovese crime family).
- Dominique Bellion, 76, French civil servant.
- Robert Benton, 92, American film director (Kramer vs. Kramer, Places in the Heart) and screenwriter (Bonnie and Clyde), Oscar winner (1980, 1985).
- Nils Bjørnflaten, 83, Norwegian politician.
- Colin Booth, 90, English footballer (Doncaster Rovers, Nottingham Forest, Wolverhampton Wanderers).
- Jim Burns, 81, Scottish footballer (Clyde, Cowdenbeath, Stirling Albion).
- Aidan Chambers, 90, English author (Postcards from No Man's Land).
- Giancarlo Cito, 79, Italian politician and businessman, mayor of Taranto (1993–1996) and deputy (1996–2001).
- Anne Dunham, 76, British equestrian, six-time Paralympic champion.
- John Edwards, 80, American Hall of Fame singer (The Spinners).
- Enzo Ferrari, 82, Italian football player (Arezzo, Palermo) and manager (Udinese).
- Viktor Gerashchenko, 87, Russian economist and politician, chairman of the Gosbank (1989–1991), twice governor of the CBR, and MP (2003–2007).
- Sharpe James, 89, American politician, member of the New Jersey Senate (1999–2008) and mayor of Newark (1986–2006).
- Jack Lancaster, 79–80, English composer and record producer. (death announced on this date)
- Michael McStay, 92, English actor (No Hiding Place, Doctor Who, Coronation Street) and writer, heart failure.
- Wilberforce Mfum, 88, Ghanaian footballer (1964 Olympics, New York Cosmos, national team).
- Larry Miller, 79, American basketball player (North Carolina Tar Heels, Los Angeles Stars, Carolina Cougars).
- Leila Negra, 95, German singer and actress (Münchhausen, The Star of Rio, Salto Mortale).
- Hans Noë, 96, American architect and sculptor.
- Omoniyi Caleb Olubolade, 70, Nigerian military administrator, governor of Bayelsa State (1997–1998).
- Paddy O'Toole, 87, Irish politician, senator (1973–1977, 1987) and TD (1977–1987).
- Fatima Saad, 69, Syrian actress.
- Sabu, 60, American professional wrestler (ECW, WWE, TNA).
- Shi Xuemin, 86, Chinese traditional medicine practitioner.
- Alena Veselá, 101, Czech organist and academic.

=== 12 ===
- Zakaria al-Agha, 83, Palestinian politician.
- Per Bartram, 81, Danish footballer (Odense BK, Greenock Morton, national team).
- Al Black, 77, American landscape artist (The Highwaymen).
- Adam Burton, 53, Australian baseball player (Melbourne Reds, 2000 Olympics).
- John Charmley, 69, British historian and academic.
- Jack Curtis, 88, American baseball player (Chicago Cubs).
- Louis Diaz, American DEA agent, complications from Parkinson's disease.
- Mark Esser, 69, American baseball player (Chicago White Sox).
- Vlastimil Hort, 81, Czech-German chess player, complications from diabetes.
- Orest Ivasiuta, 55, Ukrainian artistic metalworker.
- Abdel Ghani al-Kikli, Libyan militia leader, shot.
- Moussa Koffoé, 66–67, Guinean actor and screenwriter.
- Roger Lassale, 89, French politician, mayor of Pont-sur-Yonne (1974–2005), deputy (1981–1986).
- Ernst Mahle, 96, German-Brazilian composer and conductor.
- Alla Osipenko, 92, Russian ballerina (Kirov Ballet, Yacobson Ballet).
- Lorna Raver, 81, American actress (Drag Me to Hell, The Young and the Restless, The Caller).
- Geert Schipper, 76, Dutch road cyclist.
- Sir Roy Stone, 63, British civil servant, cardiac arrest.
- Yasunao Tone, 90, Japanese artist.

=== 13 ===
- Murray Anderson, 75, Canadian hockey player (Washington Capitals).
- Hassan Aslih, Palestinian photojournalist, airstrike.
- Chic Bates, 75, English football player (Shrewsbury Town, Swindon Town) and manager (Stoke City).
- Rasammah Bhupalan, 98, Malaysian independence and social activist.
- Kit Bond, 86, American politician, governor of Missouri (1973–1977, 1981–1985) and member of the U.S. Senate (1987–2011).
- John Bryson, 81, American businessman, lawyer and politician, secretary of commerce (2011–2012).
- Luis Armando Córdova Díaz, 56, Mexican politician, deputy (2012–2014, 2015), shot.
- Billy Earheart, 71, American country keyboardist (The Amazing Rhythm Aces, The Bama Band), Grammy winner (1977), cancer.
- Alan Eggleston, 83, Australian politician, senator (1996–2014).
- Gerry Fell, 74, English footballer (Brighton & Hove Albion, Torquay United, Southend United), cancer.
- Divaldo Franco, 98, Brazilian spiritist religious leader and medium, multiple organ failure.
- Bobby Franklin, 88, American football player (Ole Miss Rebels, Cleveland Browns).
- Richard Garwin, 97, American physicist.
- Jerome B. Gilbert, 94, American water utility manager.
- Derek Hallas, 91–92, English dual-code rugby player (Keighley, Parramatta Eels, Great Britain national team).
- Alice Hanratty, 85–86, Irish artist.
- Yaak Karsunke, 90, German author and actor (Gods of the Plague).
- Phyllis Gutiérrez Kenney, 88, American politician, member of the Washington House of Representatives (1997–2013).
- Danny Lendich, 81, New Zealand businessman (Wendy's) and midget car racing team owner.
- Lu Ruihua, 86, Chinese politician, governor of Guangdong (1996–2003).
- D. S. Malik, 66, Indian-American mathematician.
- Ramón de Pablo Marañón, 87, Spanish footballer (Barcelona, Sabadell, Catalonia).
- James Margolis, 88, American Olympic épée fencer (1960).
- Valeria Márquez, 23, Mexican influencer, shot.
- Robson Mrombe, 79, Zimbabwean Olympic athlete (1964).
- José Mujica, 89, Uruguayan revolutionary and politician, president (2010–2015), minister of livestock (2005–2008), and four-time MP, esophageal cancer.
- U. S. R. Murty, 84, Canadian mathematician.
- Eddie Marzuki Nalapraya, 93, Indonesian general and politician, vice governor of Jakarta (1984–1987).
- Gheorghe Paladi, 96, Moldovan obstetrician and gynecologist, member of the Academy of Sciences of Moldova.
- Charles Phythian-Adams, 87, English historian.
- Rich Rollins, 87, American baseball player (Minnesota Twins, Milwaukee Brewers, Cleveland Indians).
- John R. Ross, 87, American linguist.
- Szvetiszláv Sasics, 77, Hungarian modern pentathlete, Olympic bronze medallist (1976).
- Ronnie Sessions, 76, American country singer ("Wiggle Wiggle").
- Robert H. Shumway, 89, American statistician.
- Teijiro Tanikawa, 92, Japanese swimmer, Olympic silver medallist (1952), aortic dissection.
- Hewlett Thompson, 95, British Anglican bishop.
- Jon Ungphakorn, 77, Thai politician, senator (2000–2006).
- Tommy Vigorito, 65, American football player (Miami Dolphins).
- Gordon Wenham, 81, British religious scholar and writer.
- John C. Williams, 84, English baritone saxophonist.
- Notable Palestinians killed in the Gaza European Hospital strikes:
  - Muhammad Shabana, militant
  - Mohammed Sinwar, 49, militant, leader of Hamas in the Gaza Strip (since 2024)

=== 14 ===
- Nandalike Balachandra Rao, 72, Indian journalist and writer.
- Daniel Bilalian, 78, French journalist, news anchor, and television presenter.
- Enrique Cancer Lalanne, 90, Spanish judge and academic, justice of the Supreme Court (1986–2010) and president of the Central Electoral Commission (2000–2004).
- Dame June Clark, 83, British nurse.
- Richard E. Dickerson, 93, American biochemist.
- Đoàn Viết Hoạt, 82, Vietnamese journalist and political dissident.
- Frank Dunin, 89, Australian footballer (Richmond).
- Hervé Gauvain, 70, French tennis player.
- Alan Grieve, 97, British lawyer and charity founder (Jerwood Foundation).
- Cornal Hendricks, 37, South African rugby player (Bulls, Boland Cavaliers, national team), heart attack.
- Kip Holden, 72, American politician, mayor of Baton Rouge (2005–2016), member of the Louisiana House of Representatives (1988–2002) and Senate (2002–2004).
- Jeannette Laot, 100, French trade unionist (CFDT), women's rights activist (MLF) and presidential advisor (François Mitterrand).
- Chufo Lloréns, 94, Spanish writer.
- Fadéla M'rabet, 90, Algerian writer.
- Rod Nichols, 60, American baseball player (Cleveland Indians).
- Giorgio Panattoni, 88, Italian politician, deputy (1996–2006).
- Dharío Primero, 72, Dominican singer.
- Balachandra Rao, 80, Indian astronomer and mathematician.
- Alì Rashid, 72, Jordanian-born Italian politician, deputy (2006–2008).
- Lionel Smith, 96, New Zealand hurdler.
- Panos Valavanis, 71, Greek archaeologist, cancer.
- Zhu Senyuan, 94, Chinese rocket scientist.

=== 15 ===
- Joseph Akaagerger, 69, Nigerian politician, military administrator of Katsina State (1998–1999) and senator (2007–2011).
- Luigi Alva, 98, Peruvian tenor (La Scala, Metropolitan Opera).
- Bachtiar Basri, 71, Indonesian politician, vice governor of Lampung (2014–2019), vascular injury.
- Angeline Solange Bonono, 50, Cameroonian writer.
- René Bonora, 73, Cuban Olympic footballer (1976).
- Robert Brooke, 85, English cricket writer.
- Thomas Brunner, 64, Swiss politician, MP (2019–2023).
- Junior Byles, 77, Jamaican reggae singer.
- Judith Copithorne, 85, Canadian poet.
- Cristina Deleanu, 84, Romanian actress.
- Terry Draper, 73, Canadian musician (Klaatu) and songwriter ("Calling Occupants of Interplanetary Craft").
- Heidi Eisterlehner, 75, German tennis player.
- Taina Elg, 95, Finnish-American actress (Les Girls, Watusi, Imitation General).
- Bruno Franceschetti, 84, Italian Olympic gymnast (1964, 1968).
- Wilhelm Höynck, 91, German diplomat, secretary-general of the OSCE (1993–1996).
- Steve Inwood, 78, American actor (Fame, Staying Alive, Cruising).
- Kostas Lychnaras, 86, Greek film director (Christ Recrucified, Konstantinou kai Elenis, To kafe tis Charas).
- Teresa Costa Macedo, 82, Portuguese politician, MP (1981).
- Orien McNeill, 45, American artist.
- Ali Özgentürk, 79, Turkish film director, screenwriter and producer.
- Thierry Picard, 68, French rugby union player (AS Montferrand, national team) and coach (Stade Nantais), cardiac arrest.
- Marc Prensky, 79, American writer, pancreatic cancer.
- Federica Ranchi, 86, Italian actress (Wives and Obscurities, The Wide Blue Road, Violent Summer).
- Rob Reich, 47, American musician.
- Ronald Ribman, 92, American playwright and screenwriter (The Final War of Olly Winter, The Ceremony of Innocence).
- Glen Edward Rogers, 62, American convicted serial killer, execution by lethal injection.
- Tapas Kumar Saha, 65, Indian politician, West Bengal MLA (since 2021), cerebral haemorrhage.
- Montserrat Salvador, 97, Spanish actress (El Cor de la Ciutat, Cuéntame cómo pasó, Nissaga de poder).
- Scoresby Shepherd, 90, Australian lawyer and marine biologist.
- Natalya Shikolenko, 60, Belarusian javelin thrower, Olympic silver medallist (1992).
- Conrad Shinn, 102, American Navy pilot.
- Antónia de Sousa, 84, Portuguese journalist and feminist.
- Charles Strouse, 96, American composer (Bye Bye Birdie, Applause, Annie).
- Norma Meras Swenson, 92–93, American reproductive rights activist.
- Dušan Vujović, 73, Serbian politician, minister of finance (2014–2018).
- Hans-Georg Wagner, 86, German politician, member of the Landtag of Saarland (1975–1991), MP (1990–2005).
- Robert Walls, 74, Australian footballer (Carlton, Fitzroy), assisted suicide.
- Richard Weller, 61, Australian landscape architect and academic.

=== 16 ===
- Mariano Azuela Güitrón, 89, Mexican jurist, justice (1983–2009) and president (2003–2009) of the Supreme Court of Justice of the Nation.
- Marianne Bernadotte, 100, Swedish actress, philanthropist and royal family member.
- Howard Bier, 105, American politician, member (1959–1972) and speaker (1971–1972) of the North Dakota House of Representatives.
- Duncan Campbell, 80, British investigative journalist.
- William Compston, 94, Australian geophysicist.
- Dada KD, 56, Ghanaian highlife musician.
- Shaun Dennis, 55, Scottish footballer (Raith Rovers, Hibernian, Brechin City).
- Tuppy Diack, 94, New Zealand rugby union player (Otago, Southland, national team).
- Damir Dokić, 66–67, Serbian tennis coach.
- John M. Duhé Jr., 92, American jurist, judge of the U.S. District Court for the Western District of Louisiana (1984–1988) and Court of Appeals for the Fifth Circuit (since 1988).
- Glenn Floyd, 87, American politician.
- Brian Glanville, 93, English football writer and novelist.
- Maria Lúcia Godoy, 100, Brazilian soprano.
- Allen Goldman, 87, American physicist.
- Milton Johnson, 75, American serial killer.
- Emmanuel Kundé, 68, Cameroonian football player (Canon Yaoundé, national team) and manager (US Bitam), cardiac arrest.
- Peter Lax, 99, Hungarian-born American mathematician (Lax equivalence theorem, Lax–Friedrichs method), Abel Prize laureate (2005), cardiac amyloidosis.
- Domingos Maubere, 73, East Timorese Roman Catholic priest, lung infection.
- Larry Murray, 88, American songwriter ("Six White Horses").
- Manolis Papadopoulos, 57, Greek football player (Ionikos, national team) and manager (AE Giannena).
- Jadwiga Rappé, 73, Polish operatic contralto.
- Rubí Sanz Gamo, 72, Spanish art historian, director of the National Archaeological Museum (2004–2010).
- Elizabeth Sharland, 88, Australian actress.
- Gerard Soeteman, 88, Dutch screenwriter (The Assault, Turkish Delight, Soldier of Orange).
- Jan Terlouw, 93, Dutch physicist, novelist (Winter in Wartime) and politician, minister of economic affairs and deputy prime minister (1981–1982), Queen's commissioner of Gelderland (1991–1996).
- Andy Tyrie, 85, Northern Irish loyalist paramilitary leader, chairman of the Ulster Defence Association (1973–1988).
- Meta Velander, 100, Swedish actress (Honeymoon, Dear Alice, Marmalade Revolution).

=== 17 ===
- Osmany Cienfuegos, 94, Cuban politician.
- Jason Conti, 50, American baseball player (Arizona Diamondbacks, Tampa Bay Devil Rays, Milwaukee Brewers), brain injury.
- Paul Durcan, 80, Irish poet.
- Creswell Eastman, 85, Australian endocrinologist.
- Jackie Edwards, 85, English rugby league player (Warrington, Lancashire).
- Stuart Farrimond, 43, British science communicator and food scientist.
- Len Gardner, 94, Australian footballer (Richmond).
- Lungi Gcabashe, 64, South African politician, MNA (2014–2019, since 2024).
- LouAnn Gerken, 65, American psychologist and linguist, metastatic breast cancer.
- Saroj Ghose, 89, Indian museum founder, director of Birla Industrial & Technological Museum and director general of NCSM.
- Gawn Grainger, 87, Scottish actor (Doctor Who) and writer.
- Belela Herrera, 98, Uruguayan human rights activist, academic and politician, deputy minister of foreign relations (2005–2010).
- Gorgis Ismail, 82, Iraqi footballer (Al-Athori, national team).
- Priit Jaagant, 52, Estonian business executive, helicopter crash.
- Phillip Jacobson, 96, American architect.
- Ali Kazak, 78, Palestinian diplomat.
- Marie Lopez Kirkley-Bey, 83, American politician.
- Michael Ledeen, 83, American scholar and policy analyst.
- Melvyn Levitsky, 87, American diplomat, ambassador to Bulgaria (1984–1987) and Brazil (1994–1998).
- Franco Merli, 68, Italian actor (Arabian Nights, Salò, or the 120 Days of Sodom, Down and Dirty).
- Roger Nichols, 84, American songwriter ("We've Only Just Begun", "Times of Your Life") and composer.
- Elisabeth Orth, 89, Austrian actress (Kurzer Prozess, Pepperminta, Superegos).
- Porfirio Remigio, 85, Mexican Olympic cyclist (1964).
- Adam Selwood, 41, Australian footballer (West Coast Eagles), suicide.
- David R. Slavitt, 90, American writer and poet.
- Oleg Sõnajalg, 65, Estonian businessman, co-founder of TV1, helicopter crash.
- Luis Velásquez Alvaray, 71, Venezuelan lawyer and politician, deputy (2000–2004) and justice of the Supreme Tribunal of Justice (2005–2006), prostate cancer.
- Werenoi, 31, French rapper.
- Zhu Yuanyuan, 51, Chinese actress (Ocean Heaven, Lost in Hong Kong, Sister), cancer.

=== 18 ===
- Gordon Baldwin, 92, English studio potter.
- Rusty Blair, 74, American basketball player (Oregon Ducks) and coach.
- Mario Carbone, 101, Italian photographer.
- Jay Cramer, American actor (Desperate Housewives, NCIS: Los Angeles, Grey's Anatomy) and comedian.
- Leslie Epstein, 87, American writer and academic.
- Åse Frogner, 91, Norwegian textile artist.
- Fernando González Ollé, 96, Spanish linguist, writer and academic, member of the Royal Spanish Academy.
- Nicola Grauso, 76, Italian businessman.
- Harry Kelleher, 96, English cricketer (Surrey, Northamptonshire).
- Anne Merriman, 90, British doctor.
- S. R. Nayak, 80, Indian jurist, judge of the Andhra Pradesh High Court (1994–2003), acting chief justice of the Karnataka High Court (2004) and chief justice of the Chhattisgarh High Court (2005–2007).
- Sir Bill O'Brien, 96, British politician, MP (1983–2005).
- Jo Ann Prentice, 92, American golfer.
- Cindy Schreiber-Beck, 70, American politician, member of the North Dakota House of Representatives (since 2014).
- John Simpson, 100, Scottish-born New Zealand silversmith and fine arts academic.
- Jeanne Stunyo, 89, American diver, Olympic silver medalist (1956).
- Charles Thiffault, 87, Canadian ice hockey assistant coach (Montreal Canadiens, Quebec Nordiques, New York Rangers), assisted suicide.
- James Till, 93, Canadian biophysicist.

=== 19 ===
- Masao Akashi, 68, Japanese music arranger.
- Yusuf Ziya Bahadınlı, 97, Turkish politician, MP (1965–1969).
- Jay Batt, 64, American businessman and politician, member of the New Orleans City Council (2002–2006).
- Evelyn Chesky, 91, American politician, member of the Massachusetts House of Representatives (1993–2001).
- Aurora Clavel, 88, Mexican actress (Tarahumara, Once Upon a Scoundrel, Mariana de la Noche).
- David Demaine, 83, English footballer (Tranmere Rovers, Southport).
- Mike Doughty, 88, Kenyan rally co-driver.
- Alec Farrall, 89, English footballer (Everton, Gillingham, Watford).
- Colton Ford, 62, American gay pornographic actor (Naked Fame, The Lair) and singer, hiking accident.
- J. Arch Getty, 74, American historian and academic.
- Heorhiy Gina, 93, Ukrainian composer.
- Yury Grigorovich, 98, Russian ballet dancer and choreographer (Bolshoi Ballet).
- Reino Heino, 83, Finnish Olympic gymnast (1968).
- Kathleen Hughes, 96, American actress (It Came from Outer Space, The Glass Web, The Golden Blade).
- George Leitmann, 99, Austrian-American engineer and scientist.
- Robert Mbwinga Bila, Congolese politician.
- Alice Notley, 79, American poet.
- Timothy O'Hagan, 80, British philosopher.
- Jonathan Paredes, 36, Colombian racing cyclist, traffic collision.
- Joseph Ponniah, 72, Sri Lankan Roman Catholic prelate, auxuliary bishop of Trincomalee-Batticaloa (2008–2012) and bishop of Batticaloa (2012–2024).
- Ignacio Rodríguez, 68, Mexican football player (Atlante, national team) and manager (Necaxa), cancer.
- Nathan Silver, 89, American architect and architecture critic, complications from a fall.
- Martín Sombra, 87, Colombian guerrilla (Eastern Bloc of the FARC-EP).
- Manuel Torreiglesias, 84, Spanish television and radio presenter.
- Belén del Valle Díaz, 82, Spanish attorney.
- Yuri Vladimirov, 83, Russian ballet dancer and choreographer (Bolshoi Ballet).
- Hans Wiegel, 83, Dutch politician, deputy prime minister and minister of interior (1977–1981), Queen's commissioner of Friesland (1982–1994).

=== 20 ===
- Ahmadshah Abdullah, 78, Malaysian civil servant, Yang di-Pertua Negeri of Sabah (2003–2010).
- Lynn Amedee, 83, American football player (LSU) and coach (UT-Martin).
- Kay Arthur, 91, American Christian author, co-founder of Precept Ministries International.
- Jen Bartlett, 93, Australian tennis player and filmmaker (Flight of the Snow Geese).
- Nino Benvenuti, 87, Italian boxer, Olympic champion (1960), WBA/WBC light middleweight (1965–1966) and middleweight (1967, 1968–1970) champion.
- Francisco de Borbón y Escasany, 5th Duke of Seville, 81, Spanish aristocrat and banker, Grandee of Spain.
- Michael Cavanagh, 84, American jurist, member of the Michigan Supreme Court (1983–2014), chief justice (1991–1995).
- Marthe Cohn, 105, French spy, Holocaust survivor and author (Behind Enemy Lines).
- Leslie Dilley, 84, Welsh art director (Star Wars, Raiders of the Lost Ark, Alien) and production designer, Oscar winner (1978, 1982), complications from Alzheimer's disease.
- Barry Fantoni, 85, British author and cartoonist (Private Eye), heart attack.
- Arthur Hamilton, 98, American songwriter ("Cry Me a River", "I Can Sing a Rainbow").
- Joan Harrison, 89, South African swimmer, Olympic champion (1952).
- Willard D. James, 97, American mathematician.
- Gadi Kinda, 31, Ethiopian-born Israeli footballer (Ashdod, Sporting Kansas City, Israel national team).
- Scott Klingenbeck, 54, American baseball player (Baltimore Orioles).
- Harri Lumi, 92, Estonian politician, chairman of the Executive Committee of Tallinn (1984–1990).
- Jusuf Manggabarani, 72, Indonesian police officer, deputy chief of police (2010–2011).
- Jayant Narlikar, 87, Indian astrophysicist (Hoyle–Narlikar theory of gravity, Quasi-steady state cosmology).
- Patrick O'Flynn, 59, British journalist (Daily Express) and politician, MEP (2014–2019), liver cancer.
- Benjamin Ritchie, 45, American convicted murderer, execution by lethal injection.
- Michael Roemer, 97, American film director and screenwriter (Nothing but a Man, The Plot Against Harry, Dying).
- Roger Sainsbury, 88, English Anglican clergyman, bishop of Barking (1991–2002).
- M. R. Srinivasan, 95, Indian nuclear scientist, chairman of the Atomic Energy Commission (1987–1990).
- Saply TH, 71, Indonesian civil servant and politician, regent of Mesuji (2019–2022).
- Trần Đức Lương, 88, Vietnamese politician, president (1997–2006), deputy prime minister (1987–1997).
- Michael B. Tretow, 80, Swedish record producer and sound engineer (ABBA).
- Rainer Tscharke, 82, German Olympic volleyball player.
- Birgitta Wallace, 91, Swedish-Canadian archaeologist.
- George Wendt, 76, American actor (Cheers, Forever Young, Elf), cardiac arrest.
- Marina von Neumann Whitman, 90, American economist.
- Billy Williams, 95, English cinematographer (Women in Love, On Golden Pond, Gandhi), Oscar winner (1983).

=== 21 ===
- Damjana Bratuž, 97, Slovenian-born Canadian pianist and music educator.
- Swift Burch, 56, American football player (Montreal Alouettes, Toronto Argonauts, Ottawa Rough Riders), rectal cancer.
- Gerry Connolly, 75, American politician, member of the U.S. House of Representatives (since 2009), esophageal cancer.
- George Coulam, 87, American businessman, founder of the Texas Renaissance Festival, suicide.
- Randy Crowder, 72, American football player (Miami Dolphins, Tampa Bay Buccaneers).
- Franz Demetz, 95, Italian politician, member of the Landtag of South Tyrol (1968–1973, 1974–1978).
- Rajinder Singh Dhatt, 103, Indian-born British soldier and community leader.
- Nancy Doe, 76, Liberian first lady (1986–1990).
- Dorinha Duval, 96, Brazilian actress (O Bem-Amado, Selva de Pedra, Sítio do Picapau Amarelo).
- Eva, German performance artist (Eva & Adele).
- Mirosław Formela, 46, Polish middle-distance runner.
- Frank Gibson Jr., 79, New Zealand jazz drummer.
- Leszek Górski, 63, Polish Olympic swimmer (1980).
- Jørgen Gunnerud, 76, Norwegian crime fiction writer, complications from heart surgery.
- Robert A. Holton, 81, American chemist.
- Hou Beiren, 108, Chinese-American politician and painter.
- Jim Irsay, 65, American football executive, general manager (1984–1996) and owner (since 1997) of the Indianapolis Colts.
- Kirill Lebedev, 33, Russian ice hockey player (Metallurg Magnitogorsk, HC Sochi, Kunlun Red Star).
- Jean Lempereur, 86, French Olympic footballer (1968).
- Alasdair MacIntyre, 96, Scottish-American philosopher (After Virtue).
- Gloria Montenegro, 69, Peruvian politician, deputy (2016–2019), minister of women (2019–2020), and mayor of Trujillo (2014), complications from brain surgery.
- Jo Morse, 93, American bridge player.
- Mariano Ozores, 98, Spanish film director (The Daughters of Helena, Forty Degrees in the Shade, Operation Mata Hari).
- Jiří Pernes, 76, Czech historian and academic.
- Harold Pinkus, 90, Australian cricketer (Tasmania).
- Andriy Portnov, 51, Ukrainian politician and presidential aide, deputy (2006–2010), shot.
- Nambala Keshava Rao, 69–70, Indian Maoist rebel, shot.
- Nol de Ruiter, 85, Dutch football player and manager (FC Utrecht, Cambuur, national team).
- Albrecht Schöne, 99, German Germanist.
- René Simard, 89, Canadian physician.
- Bernard Tchibambelela, 78, Congolese politician, member (1992–2002) and vice-president (1992) of the National Assembly.

=== 22 ===
- Evanildo Bechara, 97, Brazilian grammarian and philologist.
- Ellen S. Berscheid, 88, American psychologist.
- Victoria Brownworth, 69, American writer and journalist.
- Douglas Chamberlain, 94, British cardiologist.
- Amanda Feilding, 82, British drug policy activist and aristocrat.
- Hugo Fernández Faingold, 78, Uruguayan politician, vice president (1998–2000).
- Leonard Greenspoon, 79, American biblical scholar.
- Gertrude Gries, 100, Austrian Olympic gymnast (1948, 1952).
- Buddy Hall, 79, American pool player.
- Kay Hartley, 95, English archaeologist.
- Douglas A. Hartwick, 74, American diplomat, ambassador to Laos (2001–2004).
- Rattan Singh Jaggi, 97, Indian scholar, author, and literary critic.
- Mark Jones, 59, Welsh dual-code rugby player (Hull, Warrington), heart attack.
- Hassan Kamshad, 99, Iranian translator.
- Guy Klucevsek, 78, American accordionist, neuroendocrine tumor.
- Yurii Kruk, 83, Ukrainian politician, deputy (1994–2014).
- Artan Lame, 58, Albanian politician.
- James Lowe, 82, American musician (The Electric Prunes) and record producer (A Woofer in Tweeter's Clothing).
- Helvi Mustonen, 77, Finnish painter and sculptor.
- Georgia O'Connor, 25, English boxer, cancer.
- Bruce Olive, 94, Australian rugby league player (Newtown, New South Wales).
- Alfredo Palacio, 86, Ecuadorian cardiologist and politician, president (2005–2007) and vice president (2003–2005).
- James Lloydovich Patterson, 91, Russian-born American child actor (Circus) and naval officer.
- Tommy Reamon, 73, American football player (Florida Blazers, Kansas City Chiefs) and actor.
- Ignasi Riera i Gassiot, 85, Spanish politician, member of the Parliament of Catalonia (1987–1999).
- Pippa Scott, 90, American actress (As Young as We Are, Auntie Mame, Petulia).
- Gertrude Shope, 99, South African politician and trade unionist, MNA (1994–1999).
- Oscar Franklin Smith, 75, American convicted murderer, execution by lethal injection.
- Morten Steenstrup, 72, Norwegian politician, MP (1981–1989), cancer.
- Dan Storper, 74, American record label executive (Putumayo World Music), cancer.
- Wang Tao, 93, Chinese petroleum industry executive and politician, general manager of the CNPC (1989–1996) and Sinopec (1988–1989).
- Michael J. Wendl, 90, American aerospace engineer.
- Daniel Williams, 39, American metalcore drummer (The Devil Wears Prada), plane crash.

=== 23 ===
- Gracia Baylor, 95, Australian politician, member of the Victorian Legislative Council (1979–1985).
- Oleksandr Berezhnyi, 67, Ukrainian footballer (Dynamo Kyiv, Tavriya Simferopol, Soviet Union national team). (death announced on this date)
- Pieter Biesboer, 80–81, Dutch art historian.
- Lillian Boutté, 75, American jazz singer.
- Pavel Chaloupka, 66, Czech footballer (Bohemians 1905, Fortuna Düsseldorf, Czechoslovakia national team).
- Anne Cheynet, 86, French author.
- Alana Cruise, 44, American pornographic actress.
- Luiz de Deus, 86, Brazilian politician, Bahia MLA (1995–2011), deputy (2013–2015).
- Mukul Dev, 54, Indian actor (Dastak, Yamla Pagla Deewana, Son of Sardaar).
- Jean-Robert Estimé, 83, Haitian politician, minister of foreign affairs (1982–1985).
- Larry Ferguson, 87, American politician, member of the Oklahoma House of Representatives (1985–2005).
- Barbara Ferris, 85, English actress (Catch Us If You Can, All in Good Faith) and fashion model.
- John Froggatt, 79, English football player (Boston United, Colchester United) and manager (Ilkeston Town).
- Mary K. Gaillard, 86, American physicist.
- Hans Geser, 78, Swiss sociologist.
- Tore Haugen, 93, Norwegian politician, MP (1977–1981, 1989–1993).
- Sacha Jenkins, 53, American journalist (Ego Trip), complications from multiple system atrophy.
- Alenka Kham Pičman, 93, Slovenian architect.
- Tor Kvarv, 72, Norwegian artist.
- Mohammed Lakhdar-Hamina, 91, Algerian film director (Chronicle of the Years of Fire, Sandstorm, The Last Image) and screenwriter.
- Jeff Margolis, 78, American television director (The Beatrice Arthur Special, Julie & Carol: Together Again, Richard Pryor: Live in Concert) and producer.
- Gerry Murphy, 81, Irish football manager (Huddersfield Town).
- Yuri Nikitin, 85, Russian author.
- Pat O'Connor, 74, American boxer, complications from Parkinson's disease.
- W. Anthony Park, 90, American politician and attorney, Idaho attorney general (1971–1975).
- Raja Raghuvanshi, 29, Indian transport businessman, murdered.
- Sir Derek Reffell, 96, British naval officer, governor of Gibraltar (1989–1993).
- Sebastião Salgado, 81, Brazilian photographer, complications from leukemia and malaria.
- Rüşdü Saracoğlu, 77, Turkish economist and politician, governor of the central bank (1987–1993), MP (1996–1999).
- Thomas J. Scheff, 96, American sociologist.
- John George Vlazny, 88, American Roman Catholic prelate, archbishop of Portland (1997–2013).
- Margaret Weitz, 95, American scholar.

=== 24 ===
- Radheshyam Bishnoi, 27–28, Indian wildlife conservationist.
- Cor Boonstra, 87, Dutch electronics executive, CEO of Philips (1996–2001).
- Susan Brownmiller, 90, American journalist and author (Against Our Will).
- Nestor Cariño, 86, Filipino Roman Catholic prelate, bishop of Borongan (1980–1986) and Legazpi (2005–2007).
- Christophe Clement, 59, French-born American Thoroughbred horse trainer, melanoma.
- Josefina Costa, 97, Brazilian politician, Piauí MLA (1971–1975).
- Peter David, 68, American comic book writer (The Incredible Hulk, Young Justice, Spider-Man 2099) and novelist.
- Tom Dunphy, 87, Canadian politician, Prince Edward Island MLA (1986–1996).
- Malini Fonseka, 78, Sri Lankan actress (Pilot Premnath, Bambaru Avith, Beddegama) and politician, MP (2010–2015).
- T. Gopinath Naidu, 51, Malaysian footballer (Kuala Lumpur, Perak, national team).
- Gu Yudong, 87, Chinese surgeon and politician, deputy (1997), heart attack.
- Elizabeth Harvey, 78, Australian politician, member of the Australian House of Representatives (1987–1990).
- Kiril Ivkov, 78, Bulgarian footballer (Levski Sofia, Minyor Pernik, national team), Olympic silver medallist (1968).
- Paul Jasmin, 90, American artist and actor (Psycho, Marie Antoinette, Adaptation).
- Gilbert LaFreniere, 90, American philosopher.
- Valery Lvov, 72, Russian boxer.
- Kenny Marco, 78, Canadian guitarist (Grant Smith & The Power, Motherlode, Blood, Sweat & Tears), cancer.
- Lyle D. Mensch, 82, American politician, member of the South Dakota House of Representatives (1973–1976).
- Piro Milkani, 85, Albanian film director (The Lady from the City, The Sorrow of Mrs. Schneider), People's Artist of Albania.
- Per Jonas Nordhagen, 95, Norwegian art historian.
- Marcel Ophuls, 97, French filmmaker (The Sorrow and the Pity, Hotel Terminus: The Life and Times of Klaus Barbie).
- John Peters, 75, British radio presenter (Radio Trent, Boom Radio).
- Gary Pierce, 74, English footballer (Wolverhampton Wanderers, Barnsley, Blackpool).
- Lili Rademakers, 95, Dutch film director (Minuet).
- Teresita Reyes, 75, Chilean actress (Sussi, The Toast, Santos), cancer.
- Eugenio Rizzolini, 87, Italian footballer (Inter Milan, Novara, Brescia).
- Christos Rokofyllos, 93, Greek politician, MP (1977–1981, 1985–2000).
- Jonathan L. Rosner, 83-84, American theoretical physicist.
- Andrew Shaw, 68, New Zealand television executive.
- Fred Strutt, 85, Australian rugby league player (St. George, Eastern Suburbs).
- Miroslav Vaic, 78, Czech screenwriter and playwright (Vítr v kapse, Byl jednou jeden polda, Svatba upírů), cancer.
- Alan Yentob, 78, British television executive, director (Cracked Actor) and presenter, controller of BBC2 (1987–1993) and BBC1 (1993–1996).

=== 25 ===
- Jorunn Aanderaa, 90, Norwegian poet.
- Alberto Luis Aguilar, 74, Bolivian politician, deputy (2002–2006).
- Bill Asprey, 88, English football player (Stoke City, Oldham Athletic) and manager (Syria national team).
- Walid Assaf, 64, Palestinian politician, minister of agriculture (2012–2014).
- Stan Atkinson, 92, American television news anchor (KOVR, KCRA).
- Günther Boekhoff, 87, German politician, member of the Landtag of Lower Saxony (1982–1994, 1996–2001).
- Guillermo Caballero Vargas, 81, Paraguayan politician and businessman.
- Don Combs, 86, American Thoroughbred racehorse trainer, complications from a stroke.
- Tadashi Endo, 77–78, Japanese butoh dancer.
- Joe Ford, 78, American jazz saxophonist.
- Frank Graham Jr., 100, American nature writer.
- Ralph Heck, 83, American football player (Philadelphia Eagles, Atlanta Falcons, New York Giants), complications from myasthenia gravis.
- Simon House, 76, English multi-instrumentalist (Hawkwind, David Bowie, Third Ear Band).
- Cathy Hudgins, 81, American politician, member of the Fairfax County Board of Supervisors (2000–2019).
- Ilselil Larsen, 90, Danish actress (Det gælder os alle, The Child, Love Wins Out).
- Motarilavoa Hilda Lin̄i, 70, Ni-Vanuatu politician and women's rights activist, MP (1987–1996), minister of justice (1996), chief of the Turaga nation.
- Ángel Mahler, 65, Argentine conductor and composer, cancer.
- Graham Mattson, 83, New Zealand rugby footballer (national team).
- Ron Moylan, 77, Australian rules footballer (Collingwood).
- Kenneth Nicholls, 90, Irish academic and historian.
- Silvia Radu, 89, Romanian sculptor, potter, and painter.
- Phil Robertson, 79, American businessman (Duck Commander) and television personality (Duck Dynasty).
- Frederic M. Scherer, 92, American economist.
- Foday Musa Suso, 75, Gambian musician and composer (Village Life, Jazz Africa, Message from Home).
- Monna Tandberg, 85, Norwegian actress (Victoria L, Drømmeslottet, Bryllupsfesten).
- Marie Tomášová, 96, Czech actress (Anna Proletářka, Jan Hus, September Nights).
- Harrison Ruffin Tyler, 96, American chemical engineer and preservationist, complications from dementia.
- Yair Vardi, 76, Israeli dancer and choreographer.
- Deborah Wheeler, 80, American politician, member of the New Hampshire House of Representatives (2006–2010, 2014–2016).
- Ward Winer, 88, American engineer.

=== 26 ===
- Jean-Raymond Abrial, 86, French computer scientist.
- Kamaluddin Azfar, 95, Pakistani politician, governor of Sindh (1995–1997).
- Ram Prakash Bambah, 99, Indian mathematician.
- Antonio Baseotto, 93, Argentine Roman Catholic prelate, bishop of Añatuya (1992–2002) and military ordinary (2002–2007).
- Sherry Bryce, 78, American country singer.
- Susan Brynteson, 95, American librarian.
- Fred Daigle, 94, Canadian Olympian boxer (1948).
- Rick Derringer, 77, American musician (The McCoys), songwriter ("Rock and Roll, Hoochie Koo") and record producer ("Weird Al" Yankovic).
- R. T. Deshmukh, Indian politician, Maharashtra MLA (2014–2019), traffic collision.
- Horacio Díaz Luco, 81, Chilean football player (Herediano, Águila, Limonense) and manager.
- Frances Doel, 83, British screenwriter (Big Bad Mama, Deathsport) and film producer (Starship Troopers).
- Adele Fasick, 95, American novelist and author.
- Ibou Faye, 55, Senegalese Olympic hurdler (1996).
- Ernst Hilger, 75, Austrian gallery owner.
- Yuriy Hnatkevych, 85, Ukrainian politician, deputy (1990–1994, 2006–2012).
- Co Hoedeman, 84, Dutch-born Canadian animator (The Sand Castle), Oscar winner (1978).
- Robert Jarvik, 79, American medical engineer, complications from Parkinson's disease.
- Waleed Al-Jasem, 65, Kuwaiti footballer (Kuwait, national team).
- Oliver Kilmurray, 78, Irish Gaelic footballer (Daingean, Offaly). (death announced on this date)
- Paul Marantz, 86–87, American architectural lighting designer.
- Barry McIlheney, 65, British journalist and editor (Empire).
- Grenville Millington, 73, Welsh footballer (Chester City, Wrexham).
- Charles Rangel, 94, American politician, member of the U.S. House of Representatives (1971–2017).
- İlhan Şeşen, 76, Turkish musician, lung cancer.
- Md Shamsul Huda Manik, Bangladeshi jurist, justice of the Supreme Court.
- Horace Speed, 73, American baseball player (Cleveland Indians, San Francisco Giants).
- Len St. Jean, 83, American football player (New England Patriots).
- Gerhard Steinke, 97, German sound engineer.
- John A. Young, 93, American business executive and electrical engineer, CEO of Hewlett-Packard (1978–1992).
- Muhammad az-Zanati, 88, Libyan politician, secretary-general of the General People's Congress (1992–2008).

=== 27 ===
- Freddie Aguilar, 72, Filipino musician and singer-songwriter ("Anak"), multiple organ failure.
- Janet Ajzenstat, 89, Canadian political scientist.
- Choi Jung-woo, 68, South Korean actor (Like a Virgin, City Hunter, Doctor Stranger).
- Presley Chweneyagae, 40, South African actor (Tsotsi, The River), complications from a breathing problem.
- Graeme Crawford, 77, Scottish footballer (York City, Scunthorpe United, Scarborough).
- Val Deakin, 89, New Zealand dancer and choreographer.
- Dawn Dekle, 58, American educator.
- Ronnie Dugger, 95, American journalist (The Texas Observer), complications from dementia.
- Paul Dutton, 81, Canadian poet and writer.
- Vasily Funtikov, 62, Russian actor (Tuning Fork, Presumption of Innocence, The Sisters Liberty).
- Ed Gale, 61, American stuntman (Child's Play) and actor (Howard the Duck, Spaceballs).
- Jim Gouk, 79, Canadian politician, MP (1993–2006), cancer.
- Devin Harjes, 41, American actor (Boardwalk Empire, Manifest, Gotham), complications from cancer.
- Irianti Erningpraja, 59, Indonesian singer.
- Brian Kellock, 63, Scottish jazz pianist.
- Felix Konotey-Ahulu, 94, Ghanaian physician and geneticist.
- Agata Kowalska-Szubert, 57, Polish scholar.
- Michael Krausz, 82, American philosopher, musician, and artist.
- Peter Kwong, 73, American actor (Big Trouble in Little China, The Golden Child, Cooties).
- Banoth Madanlal, 62, Indian politician, Telangana MLA (2014–2019), heart disease.
- Claudio Michelotto, 82, Italian racing cyclist.
- Idriss Ngari, 79, Gabonese politician, minister of national defense (1994–1999) and MP (1996–2018).
- Annette Bryn Parri, 62, Welsh pianist.
- Serhiy Potimkov, 70, Ukrainian politician, deputy (1998–2002, 2006–2007).
- Jill Raitt, 94, American academic.
- Tom Robbins, 76, American journalist.
- Peter Smith, 68, British computer scientist.
- Red Sternberg, 50, Filipino actor (T.G.I.S.), heart attack.
- Willie Stevenson, 85, Scottish footballer (Rangers, Liverpool, Stoke City).
- Jean Tiberi, 90, French politician, mayor of Paris (1995–2001) and MP (1968–1976, 1976–2012).
- Juan Ramón Verón, 81, Argentine footballer (Estudiantes de La Plata, Panathinaikos, national team).
- Charles K. Wiggins, 77, American jurist, justice of the Washington Supreme Court (2011–2020), complications from Parkinson's disease.
- Herbert P. Wilkins, 94, American jurist, chief justice of the Massachusetts Supreme Judicial Court (1996–1999).

=== 28 ===
- Marcos Azambuja, 90, Brazilian diplomat.
- Charles Chieng, 70, Micronesian politician, governor of Yap (since 2023).
- Ronald V. Clarke, 84, English criminologist.
- Sukhdev Singh Dhindsa, 89, Indian politician, MP (2004–2022).
- Heliodoro Dols, 91, Spanish architect (Shrine of Torreciudad).
- Al Foster, 82, American jazz drummer.
- Rubén Oscar Franco, 97, Argentine naval officer.
- Luisa Fuentes, 76, Peruvian Olympic volleyball player (1968, 1972).
- Hamit Geylani, 77, Turkish politician, MP (2007–2011).
- Giancarlo Gutierrez, 92, Italian Olympic equestrian (1956).
- Salman Hashimikov, 73, Russian wrestler, four-time world champion.
- L. C. Hayden, 76, American novelist.
- Gill James, 90, Australian politician, Tasmania MHA (1976–1986, 1992–2002).
- Bradley Jennings, 47, American football player (Florida State Seminoles).
- Marijke Linthorst, 73, Dutch politician, member of the Senate (1995–1999, 2003–2015).
- Sunjoy Monga, 63, Indian wildlife photographer, conservationist, and writer.
- Mohammed Said Hersi Morgan, 76, Somali military officer, minister of defence (1990–1991).
- Per Nørgård, 92, Danish composer (Gilgamesh, Symphony No. 3) and academic teacher (Royal Academy of Music, Aarhus/Aalborg).
- Sir Bob Reid, 91, British railway executive, chairman of the British Railways Board (1990–1995).
- Jacques Robert, 96, French jurist and academic administrator, president of the Paris-Panthéon-Assas University (1979–1984).
- Claude Roussel, 94, Canadian sculptor.
- Serhiy Shvets, 48, Ukrainian politician, deputy (since 2019).
- George E. Smith, 95, American physicist, co-inventor of the charge-coupled device, Nobel Prize laureate (2009).
- Soaring Free, 26, Canadian Thoroughbred racehorse.
- Julie Speidel, 83–84, American sculptor.
- Ngũgĩ wa Thiong'o, 87, Kenyan novelist (Weep Not, Child, The River Between, A Grain of Wheat).
- Verle Tiefenthaler, 87, American baseball player (Chicago White Sox).
- Francis Xavier Yu Soo-il, 80, South Korean Roman Catholic prelate, bishop of the Military Ordinariate of Korea (2010–2021).

=== 29 ===
- Elizette Bayan, 86, Portuguese operatic soprano.
- Patricia Berne, 58, American disability rights activist.
- John Boardman, 92, American physicist.
- Rolf Bühler, 82, Swiss Olympic javelin thrower (1968).
- Kenny Clark, 47, American football player (Minnesota Vikings).
- Alf Clausen, 84, American composer (The Simpsons, ALF, Moonlighting), Emmy winner (1997, 1998), progressive supranuclear palsy.
- Ludo Dierckxsens, 60, Belgian racing cyclist.
- Mike Eddy, 72, American stock car racer (ASA).
- Juan Manuel Eguiagaray, 79, Spanish politician and economist, minister of industry (1993–1996).
- Sten Erickson, 95, Swedish Olympic triple jumper (1960).
- Tshenuwani Farisani, 76, South African politician, MNA (2009–2010) and speaker of the Limpopo Provincial Legislature (2004–2009).
- Vicki Goldberg, 88, American photography critic, author, and photo historian.
- Roberto Gomes Guimarães, 89, Brazilian Roman Catholic prelate, bishop of Campos (1995–2011).
- Bernard Kerik, 69, American police officer and political consultant, New York City police commissioner (2000–2001) and acting minister of interior of Iraq (2003), heart disease.
- Aleksey Lidov, 66, Russian art historian.
- Francesco Mallardo, 74, Italian mobster (Mallardo clan).
- Susann McDonald, 90, American classical harpist.
- John Newell, 89, Canadian politician, Nova Scotia MLA (1983–1988).
- Prasanna Pattnaik, 76, Indian politician, Odisha MLA (1977–1980, 1985–1995).
- Deborah Pellow, 80, American anthropologist.
- Rajesh, 75, Indian actor (Kanni Paruvathile, Achamillai Achamillai, Virumaandi).
- Vreni Spoerry, 87, Swiss politician, member of the National Council (1986–1996) and Council of States (1996–2003).
- David Trist, 77, New Zealand cricketer (Canterbury) and cricket coach (Eastern Province, national team).
- Charles Wadsworth, 96, American classical pianist and organizer of chamber music series (Festival dei Due Mondi, Chamber Music Society of Lincoln Center, Spoleto Festival USA).

=== 30 ===
- Stjepan Andrašić, 83, Croatian journalist, chief editor of Večernji list (1983–1990).
- George Annas, 79, American scholar and ethicist.
- Étienne-Émile Baulieu, 98, French endocrinologist and biochemist.
- Sir Kenneth Bloomfield, 94, British civil servant.
- Michael J. Byrnes, 66, American Roman Catholic prelate, archbishop of Agaña (2019–2023), complications from Alzheimer's disease.
- Chang Yoon-chang, 64, South Korean Olympic volleyball player (1984, 1988), stomach cancer.
- Travis Decker, 32, American military veteran.
- Bedřich Dlouhý, 92, Czech painter and academic.
- Kim R. Gibson, 77, American jurist, judge of the U.S. District Court for the Western District of Pennsylvania (since 2003).
- Norman Hallam, 79, English clarinetist and composer. (death announced on this date)
- Prentis Hancock, 83, British actor (Space: 1999, Doctor Who, Spy Trap).
- Masaru Imada, 93, Japanese jazz pianist and composer.
- Abdul Ismail, 79, Indian cricketer (Bombay), cardiac arrest.
- Dauda Musa Komo, 65, Nigerian military administrator, administrator of Rivers State (1993–1996).
- James Hector MacDonald, 100, Canadian Roman Catholic prelate, auxiliary bishop of Hamilton (1978–1982), bishop of Charlottetown (1982–1991) and archbishop of St. John's (1991–2000).
- Valerie Mahaffey, 71, American actress (The Doctors, French Exit, Young Sheldon), Emmy winner (1992), cancer.
- Jakob Maurer, 95, Swiss architect and urban planner.
- Katarina Mazetti, 81, Swedish author and journalist.
- Peter Mazzaferro, 94, American college football coach (Waynesburg, Curry).
- Red Pedersen, 89–90, Danish-born Canadian politician and trading post manager, Northwest Territories MLA (1983–1991).
- Mario Primicerio, 84, Italian mathematician and politician, mayor of Florence (1995–1999).
- Anna Mae Robertson, 101, American army officer.
- Keith Rudd, 79, English cricketer (Minor Counties North, Norfolk).
- Henning Scheich, 83, German brain researcher and psychiatrist.
- Paul Bernd Spahn, 85, German economist.
- Loretta Swit, 87, American actress (M*A*S*H, Freebie and the Bean, Race with the Devil), Emmy winner (1980, 1982).
- John Thrasher, 81, American politician and academic administrator, member of the Florida Senate (2009–2014) and House of Representatives (1992–2000), president of FSU (2014–2021), cancer.
- Fernando Venâncio, 80, Portuguese writer.
- H. S. Venkateshamurthy, 80, Indian screenwriter (Chinnari Mutha, Kraurya) and lyricist (Kotreshi Kanasu).
- Renée Victor, 86, American actress (Weeds, Coco, The Elder Scrolls V: Skyrim), lymphoma.

=== 31 ===
- Adolfo Andrade, 75, Colombian footballer (Deportes Quindío, Deportivo Cali, national team).
- Anwarul Azim, 77, Bangladeshi politician, MP (2001–2006).
- John Brenkus, 53, American television producer (Sport Science), suicide.
- David John Chambers, 95, English bibliographer.
- Veronica Chan, 102, Hong Kong football executive.
- Seth Dittman, 52, American football player (Hamilton Tiger-Cats, Ottawa Renegades, Indianapolis Colts).
- William Dudley, 78, British theatre designer, dementia.
- Stanley Fischer, 81, Israeli-American economist, governor of the Bank of Israel (2005–2013) and Vice Chair of the Federal Reserve (2014–2017).
- Dan Gallin, 94, Polish-born American labour activist and trade unionist.
- Carmencita Hederman, 85, Irish politician, senator (1989–1993), lord mayor of Dublin (1987–1988).
- Betsy Jochum, 104, American baseball player (South Bend Blue Sox).
- Jerrauld Jones, 70, American politician and jurist, member of the Virginia House of Delegates (1988–2002).
- Marcie Jones, 79, Australian singer (Marcie and The Cookies), leukaemia.
- Joan Lippincott, 89, American concert organist.
- Andrew Matheson, 73, Canadian-British rock singer (Hollywood Brats), leukaemia.
- Mike McCallum, 68, Jamaican boxer (1976 Olympics), WBA light middleweight (1984–1987) and middleweight (1989–1991), WBC light heavyweight (1994–1995) champion.
- Hichem Miraoui, 45-46, Tunisian hairdresser, shot.
- Ernesto Pellegrini, 84, Italian catering industry and football executive, chairman of Inter Milan (1984–1995), lung infection.
- Petros Sithole, South African politician, MP (since 2009).
- William S. Sly, 92, American physician.
- Annie Stainer, 79, English mime.
- Lachie Stewart, 81, Scottish Olympic runner (1972).
- Valmik Thapar, 73, Indian naturalist (Land of the Tiger), cancer.
