= Ron Moylan =

Australian rules footballer

Personal information
- Full name: Ron Moylan
- Born: 26 September 1947
- Died: 25 May 2025 (aged 77)
- Original team: West Ivanhoe CYMS (CYMSFA)

Playing career^{1}
Years	Club	Games (Goals)
1968–69	Collingwood	12 (9)
- ^{1} Playing statistics correct to the end of 1969.

Ron Moylan (born 26 September 1947, died 25 May 2025) was an Australian rules footballer who played with Collingwood in the Victorian Football League (VFL).
