= Harold Pinkus =

Australian cricketer

Personal information
- Full name: Harold William Pinkus
- Born: 27 September 1934; Smithton, Tasmania, Australia
- Died: 21 May 2025 (aged 90); Adelaide, South Australia, Australia

Domestic team information
- Years: Team
- 1956/57: Tasmania
- Source: Cricinfo, 11 March 2016

Harold William Pinkus (27 September 1934 – 21 May 2025) was an Australian cricketer. He played two first-class matches for Tasmania in the 1956–57 season.

Pinkus was a middle-order batsman. He scored a century on his first-class debut in January 1957, finishing on 102 not out in the second innings. He was the second Tasmanian to do so, after Max Thomas in 1945–46.
