= Luiz de Deus =

Brazilian politician (1938–2025)

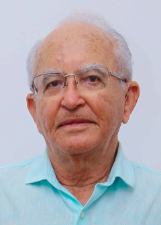
- De Deus in 2020

Member of the Chamber of Deputies of Brazil for Bahia
- In office 3 January 2013 – 31 January 2015

Member of the Legislative Assembly of Bahia
- In office 1 February 1995 – 31 January 2011

Personal details
- Born: Luiz Barbosa de Deus; 5 June 1938 Brejo Grande, Sergipe, Brazil
- Died: 23 May 2025 (aged 86) Paulo Afonso, Bahia, Brazil
- Party: PFL/Democrats (1985–2015); PSD (2015–2025)
- Education: Federal University of Bahia
- Occupation: Doctor

Luiz Barbosa de Deus (5 June 1938 – 23 May 2025) was a Brazilian politician. A member of the Democrats and the Social Democratic Party, he served in the Legislative Assembly of Bahia from 1995 to 2011 and in the Chamber of Deputies from 2013 to 2015.

De Deus died in Paulo Afonso on 23 May 2025, at the age of 86.
