= Günther Boekhoff =

German politician (1938–2025)

Member of the Landtag of Lower Saxony
- In office 1996–2001
- In office 1982–1994

Personal details
- Born: 31 January 1938; Leer, Gau Weser-Ems, Germany
- Died: 25 May 2025 (aged 87); Leer, Lower Saxony, Germany
- Political party: SPD
- Occupation: Banker

Günther Boekhoff (31 January 1938 – 25 May 2025) was a German politician. A member of the Social Democratic Party, he served in the Landtag of Lower Saxony from 1982 to 1994 and again from 1996 to 2001.

Boekhoff died on 25 May 2025, at the age of 87.
