= Judith Hope Blau =

American artist (1938–2025)

Judith Hope Blau (April 5, 1938 – May 4, 2025) was an American painter, jewelry maker, writer, and toy designer.

== Early life and education ==
Blau was born in the Bronx and raised in Morris Park, Bronx. Her parents were dentist Samuel Ravinett and Evalynne (Korodsky) Ravinett, an entrepreneur who operated laundromats.

Blau graduated from the University of Rochester with a fine-arts degree. She also studied at Cornell University, Hunter College, and Columbia University.

== Career ==
Blau was a painter, who then developed a necklace made from painted mini-bagels which became extraordinarily popular and was sold in stores, including Bloomingdale's.

Blau published a children's book The Baker of Mulliner Lane in 1976. A review in The New York Times Book Review commented that her "illustrations start pleasantly muted but turn loony."

She later branched out into toy design, developing several successful toys, including one that sold a million units for Hasbro in 1985.

== Personal life ==
She married Lawrence Blau, a nuclear physicist, in 1959, and they had two children. Her husband died in 2015.
