= Christián Muñoz Ortega =

Chilean sports shooter

Personal information
- Nationality: Chilean
- Born: 14 July 1959
- Died: May 7, 2025 (aged 65) Curacaví, Chile

Sport
- Sport: Shooting
- Events: 50 metre pistol, 10 metre air pistol

Christián Muñoz Ortega (July 14, 1959 – May 7, 2025) was a Chilean sport shooter. He competed at the 2000 Summer Olympics, placing 36th in the men's 50 metre pistol event and 40th in the men's 10 metre air pistol event.

Muñoz Ortega died on May 7, 2025, after the air ambulance plane he was piloting crashed in Curacaví, killing him and the other five occupants on board.
