= Yolanda Consuegra Martínez =

Salvadoran writer (1940–2025)

- Born: November 13, 1940; Zacatecoluca, El Salvador
- Died: May 4, 2025 (aged 84); Santa Ana, El Salvador
- Resting place: Parque Jardín las Flores; Santa Ana, El Salvador
- Education: Universidad de El Salvador; Loyola University of New Orleans; Case Western Reserve University; University of Denver
- Occupations: Social worker; Writer; Storyteller; Novelist; Short story writer
- Writing career
- Years active: 56 years
- Genres: Novel; Short story
- Notable works: Corazón ladino (1967); Sus fríos ojos azules (1965)

Yolanda Emma Consuegra Martínez, a Salvadoran writer, was born in Zacatecoluca, El Salvador, and died in Santa Ana, El Salvador, on May 4, 2025. She worked as a social worker and cultivated her writing skills from an early age. Despite being marginalized by critics, her work made a significant contribution to the field of Salvadoran literature.

== Early life and education ==
The biographical research on Yolanda Consuegra Martínez presents challenges, as there are few references available about her life. The only published biography was completed by the writer Roxana Beatri, and together with the only interview obtained by Julio Torres-Recinos, we can gain some insight into the life of Yolanda Consuegra Martínez. Her parents were Francisco Javier Consuegra and Dolores Martínez de Consuegra, who had four children; Yolanda Consuegra Martínez was the second child. There is no information available about Yolanda Consuegra Martínez’s childhood and youth; however, Serrano recounts that “Yolanda spent her childhood in Usulután until 1945 and then, from 1946 to 1956, in Ahuachapán, where she completed elementary and middle school”. She obtained her high school diploma in Science and Literature and graduated with a degree in Social Work from the Universidad de El Salvador. A few years later, she was awarded a scholarship that allowed her to complete her studies in the United States; at Loyola University of New Orleans, Louisiana; at Case Western Reserve University in Cleveland, Ohio; and at the University of Denver, Colorado.

== Career ==
After completing her academic studies, Yolanda Consuegra Martínez commented the following in the interview with Julio Torres-Recinos:

My professional experience includes, first, the Attorney General’s Office (formerly known as Pobres), now the Attorney General’s Office of the Republic, the Psychiatric Hospital, and Rosales Hospital. Later, I moved on to the School of Social Work as a practice supervisor.

Yolanda Consuegra Martínez did not intend to train as a social worker; apparently, she would have liked to study law or journalism. Despite the significance of her work, Yolanda Consuegra Martínez did not receive the recognition she deserved, either in El Salvador or internationally. In her own words, the writer commented:

First of all, as my profession took up most of my time, I moved in that circle, and I did not feel the need to socialize with other groups…As for the lack of national or international recognition, perhaps it is because my work does not interest the vast majority of people, or because of my style. Also, since I have not been associated with any literary organization, there have been no groups or foundations to support my work. If I had not met Mrs. López, the owner of the publishing house [Clásicos Roxsil], perhaps my work would not have been disseminated because the Ministry of Education, which first published Corazón ladino, did not distribute the book widely.

== Literature work ==
=== Novels ===
- Sus fríos ojos azules (1965)
- Corazón ladino (1967)
- Veinte cartas neuróticas desde Alabama (1972)
- A la zaga (1995)
- ¡Quédate con nosotros! (1998)
- El corazón es una casa muy grande (2000)
- Estaré en los altares (inédita entre 1993-94)
- Sin punto final (???)
- El huerto cerrado de los Masferrer (2018)
- Los ochos relojes de Laura (2021)

=== Short stories ===
- Seis cuentos (1964)
- Una mañana de domingo: doce relatos de contenido social (2005)
