= Hữu Ngọc =

Vietnamese writer (1918–2025)

- Born: Nguyễn Hữu Ngọc; 22 December 1918; Hanoi, Tonkin, French Indochina
- Died: 2 May 2025 (aged 106)
- Education: Lycée du Protectorat
- Occupation: Writer and journalist

Nguyễn Hữu Ngọc (22 December 1918 – 2 May 2025) was a Vietnamese writer and journalist.

== Life and career ==
Hữu entered the Lycée du Protectorat and went on to graduate with degrees in philosophy and law. During the First Indochina War, his skills in Chinese, English, French, and German were put to use by the North Vietnam government. During the 1950s, he worked in the General Department of Politics of the Vietnam People's Army and was editor-in-chief of Tia lửa, a French-language propaganda newspaper.

Hữu Ngọc died on 2 May 2025, at the age of 106.

== Works ==
- Le Vietnam en marche (1955)
- Anthologie de la littérature populaire du Vietnam (1982)
- Hồ sơ văn hoá Mỹ (1995)
- Dictionnaire de la culture traditionnelle du Vietnam (1997)
- Phác thảo chân dung văn hoá Pháp (2006)
- Dạo chơi vườn văn Nhật Bản (2006)
- Wandering Through Vietnamese Culture (2006)
- Pho a specialty of Hanoi (2008)
- Water puppets (2008)
- À la découverte de la culture vietnamienne (2008)
- Tục lệ cưới xin/ Wedding customs (2011)
- Võ dân tộc / Martial Arts (2011)
- Vietnamese Folk-Tales Satire and Humour (2012)
- Lãng Du Trong Văn Hóa Xứ Sở Hoa Anh Đào (2016)
