= Bruce Olive =

Australian rugby league player (1930–2025)

Personal information
- Born: 28 August 1930
- Died: 22 May 2025 (aged 94); Wollongong, New South Wales, Australia

Playing information
- Position: Prop
Club
Years	Team	Pld	T	G	FG	P
1964–67	Newtown	69	1	0	0	3
Representative
Years	Team	Pld	T	G	FG	P
1959–62	NSW Country Firsts	4	0	0	0	0
1958–62	New South Wales	8	2	0	0	6

Bruce Olive (28 August 1930 – 22 May 2025) was an Australian indigenous professional rugby league player who played as a prop forward for the Newtown Jets in the 1960s.

Wollongong prop played for New South Wales in nine matches between 1958-62 but could not break into the Australian Test side. Olive, who paved the way for Country’s upset wins over City in 1961-62, later played with Newtown in the mid-1960s.

Olive died on 22 May 2025, at the age of 94.
