= Moussa Koffoé =

Guinean actor and screenwriter (1958–2025)

- Born: Moussa Keita; 1958; Kindia, French Guinea, French West Africa
- Died: 12 May 2025 (aged 66–67); Kindia, Guinea
- Occupation(s): Actor; Screenwriter

Moussa Keita (1958 – 12 May 2025), better known by the stage name Moussa Koffoé, was a Guinean actor and screenwriter.

== Life and career ==
Born in Kindia in 1958, Koffoé grew up in a modest family while showing an interest in comedy from a young age. He initially worked as a tailor before putting his comic and imitation skills into action. His work inspired a generation of comedians in Guinea, including Mamadou Thug. In 2016, he received a prize for best West African actor at the Yerebougou festival in Bamako.

Moussa Koffoé died in Kindia on 12 May 2025.

== Plays ==
- Sala Musso
- Bakongo
- Di Bari Khônô
- Di koby

== Films ==
- Moussa le Voleur
- Moussa l’Insupportable
- Le Mariage d’intérêt et ses conséquences
- Elèves impolis
