= Ignasi Riera i Gassiot =

Spanish politician (1940–2025)

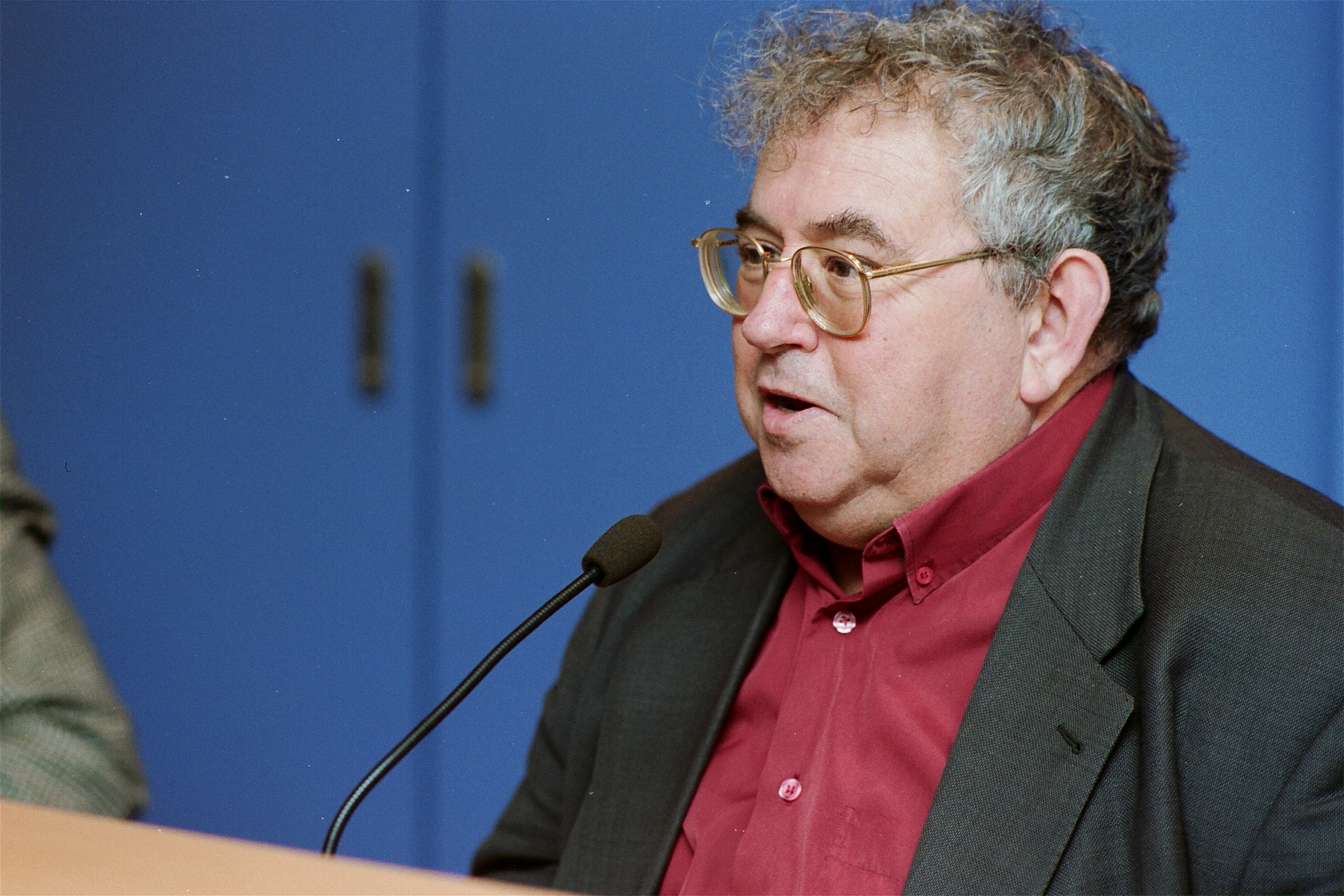
- Riera in 2001

Member of the Parliament of Catalonia for Barcelona
- In office 11 August 1987 – 24 August 1999

Personal details
- Born: 5 January 1940; Barcelona, Spain
- Died: 22 May 2025 (aged 85); Madrid, Spain
- Political party: PSUC (1973–1988); ICV (after 1988)
- Education: University of Barcelona
- Occupation: Journalist

Ignasi Riera i Gassiot (5 January 1940 – 22 May 2025) was a Spanish politician. A member of the Unified Socialist Party of Catalonia and the Initiative for Catalonia Greens, he served in the Parliament of Catalonia from 1987 to 1999.

Riera died in Madrid on 22 May 2025, at the age of 85.
