= Franz Demetz =

Italian politician (1930–2025)

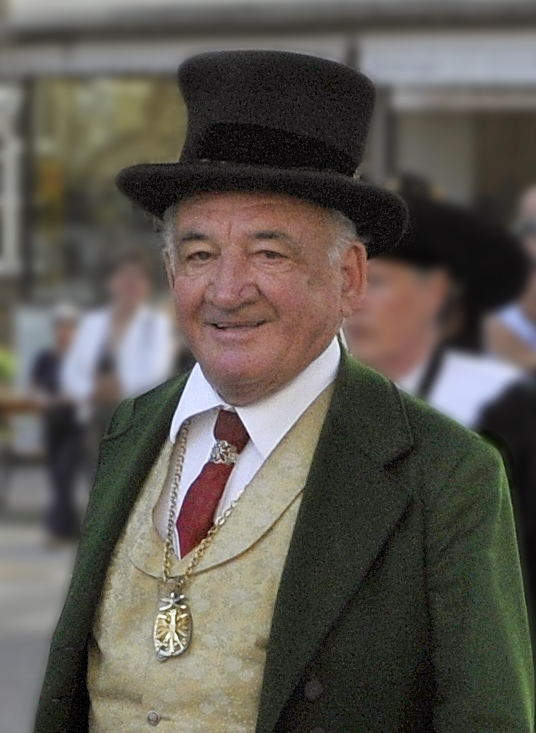
- Demetz in 2011

Member of the Landtag of South Tyrol
- In office 7 June 1974 – 12 December 1978
- In office 13 December 1968 – 12 December 1973

Personal details
- Born: Franz Alois Demetz; 24 January 1930 Santa Cristina Gherdëina, Italy
- Died: 21 May 2025 (aged 95) Santa Cristina Gherdëina, Italy
- Party: SVP

Franz Alois "Pallua" Demetz (24 January 1930 – 21 May 2025) was an Italian politician. A member of the South Tyrolean People's Party, he served in the Landtag of South Tyrol from 1968 to 1973 and again from 1974 to 1978.

Demetz died in Santa Cristina Gherdëina on 21 May 2025, at the age of 95.
