= Orest Ivasiuta =

Ukrainian master of artistic metalwork (1969–2025)

- Орест Васильович Івасюта
- Born: 4 September 1969; Ivano-Frankivsk
- Died: 12 May 2025 (aged 55); Lviv
- Education: Kosiv Tekhnikum of Folk Art Crafts, Lviv Academy of Arts
- Occupation: Master of artistic metalwork
- Awards: Merited Painter of Ukraine

Orest Ivasiuta (Ukrainian: Орест Васильович Івасюта; 4 September 1969 – 12 May 2025) was a Ukrainian master of artistic metalwork. He became a member of the Union of Masters of Forging Art of Ukraine in 2005 and was awarded the title of Merited Painter of Ukraine in 2007.

== Biography ==
Orest Ivasiuta was born on 4 September 1969, in Ivano-Frankivsk.

In 1989, he graduated from the artistic metalwork department of the Kosiv Tekhnikum of Folk Art Crafts. In 1996, he graduated from the Lviv Academy of Arts, where his specialized teachers were Oleh Bonkovskyi, Bohdan Romanets, and Viktor Sholomii. In 2003, he began working at his alma mater as a lecturer in the metal department and a junior researcher in the research sector; he later became an docent in the artistic metal department.

In 2007, he founded and headed the NGO "Tovarystvo Zaliznoho Leva" in Lviv.

He died on 12 May 2025, in Lviv.

== Creativity ==
He worked with artistic metal (forging, jewelry, objects). From 1994, he began to present his works at all-Ukrainian and international exhibitions. In Ivasiuta's early works, one can trace simple and abstract symbols from archaic and ancient Slavic motifs. Later works became more original and profound in content and form. In all his works, he combines various materials, techniques, and compositions.

Among his important works are: the memorial plaque to Iryna Vilde (1989, Ivano-Frankivsk Literary Museum), "Yurii-Zmiieborets" (St. George the Dragon-Slayer) (1997), "Skarbnychka i Zlodii", a ring (both — 1998), "Punkt Peretynu" (2000), "Kalika" (2002), "Liubov" (2007).

== Awards ==
- Merited Painter of Ukraine (20 March 2007).

== Bibliography ==
- "Івасюта Орест". Енциклопедія художнього металу.
- "Івасюта Орест Васильович". Львівська національна академія мистецтв.
