= Hannes Primus =

Austrian politician (1976–2025)

Member of the Carinthian Landtag
- In office 28 March 2013 – 4 March 2018

Personal details
- Born: 1 August 1976 Klagenfurt am Wörthersee, Carinthia, Austria
- Died: 7 May 2025 (aged 48)
- Political party: SPÖ
- Education: Carinthia University of Applied Sciences
- Occupation: Engineer

Hannes Primus (1 August 1976 – 7 May 2025) was an Austrian politician. A member of the Social Democratic Party, he served in the Carinthian Landtag from 2013 to 2018.

Primus died on 7 May 2025, at the age of 48.
