= Lyle D. Mensch =

American politician (1942–2025)

Member of the South Dakota House of Representatives
- In office 1973–1976

Personal details
- Born: June 7, 1942
- Died: May 24, 2025 (aged 82)
- Party: Democratic
- Children: 3

Lyle D. Mensch (June 7, 1942 – May 24, 2025) was an American politician. He served as a Democratic member of the South Dakota House of Representatives.

== Life and career ==
Mensch was a school board member.

Mensch served in the South Dakota House of Representatives from 1973 to 1976.
