= Wilhelm Höynck =

German diplomat (1933–2025)

Secretary-General of the Organization for Security and Co-operation in Europe
- In office 15 June 1993 – 15 June 1996
- Preceded by: position established
- Succeeded by: Giancarlo Aragona

Personal details
- Born: 11 December 1933; Solingen, Rhine Province, Prussia, Germany
- Died: 15 May 2025 (aged 91); Bonn, North Rhine-Westphalia, Germany
- Education: University of Cologne; University of Freiburg; University of Bonn
- Occupation: Diplomat

Wilhelm Höynck (11 December 1933 – 15 May 2025) was a German diplomat. He served as Secretary-General of the Organization for Security and Co-operation in Europe from 1993 to 1996.

Höynck died in Bonn on 15 May 2025, at the age of 91.
