= Giorgio Panattoni =

Italian politician (1937–2025)

Member of the Chamber of Deputies of Italy for Piedmont 1
- In office 25 April 1996 – 27 April 2006

Personal details
- Born: 6 April 1937; Milan, Italy
- Died: 14 May 2025 (aged 88); Ivrea, Italy
- Political party: PDS (until 1998); DS (1998–2007); SD (2007–2009)
- Education: Polytechnic University of Milan
- Occupation: Business consultant

Giorgio Panattoni (6 April 1937 – 14 May 2025) was an Italian politician. A member of the Democratic Party of the Left, the Democrats of the Left, and the Democratic Left, he served in the Chamber of Deputies from 1996 to 2006.

Panattoni died in Ivrea on 14 May 2025, at the age of 88.
