= Josefina Costa =

Brazilian politician (1928–2025)

Member of the Legislative Assembly of Piauí
- In office 1 February 1971 – 31 January 1975

Personal details
- Born: Josefina Dias Ferreira Costa; 22 April 1928; São Raimundo Nonato, Piauí, Brazil
- Died: 24 May 2025 (aged 97); São João do Piauí, Piauí, Brazil
- Political party: ARENA
- Occupation: Teacher

Josefina Dias Ferreira Costa (22 April 1928 – 24 May 2025) was a Brazilian politician. A member of the National Renewal Alliance, she served in the Legislative Assembly of Piauí from 1971 to 1975.

Costa died in São João do Piauí on 24 May 2025, at the age of 97.
