= Timothy O'Hagan =

British political philosopher (1945–2025)

- Born: 4 January 1945
- Died: 19 May 2025 (aged 80)

Education
- Education: Westminster School; Corpus Christi College, Oxford (BA, PhD)

Philosophical work
- Era: 21st-century philosophy
- Region: Western philosophy
- Institutions: University of East Anglia

Timothy David Brendan O'Hagan (4 January 1945 – 19 May 2025) was a British philosopher, who was a professor in the Department of Philosophy, University of East Anglia.

O'Hagan is best known for his work on Rousseau's thought (Rousseau, 1999) and philosophy of law (The End of Law?, 1984).

O'Hagan died on 19 May 2025, at the age of 80.

== Books ==
- Jean-Jacques Rousseau, Routledge 1999
- The End of Law?, Blackwell 1984
