= Belela Herrera =

Uruguayan politician (1927–2025)

Belela Herrera (2 April 1927 – 17 May 2025) was a Uruguayan politician who served as Deputy Minister of Foreign Relations. He died on 17 May 2025, at the age of 98.
