= Chufo Lloréns =

Spanish writer (1931–2025)

Josep Llorens (1931 – 14 May 2025), better known as Chufo Lloréns, was a Spanish writer specializing in historical novels. His novel I Will Give You the Earth became a bestseller in 2008.

== Life and career ==
Lloréns was born in 1931 in Barcelona, working in the entertainment industry before writing in 1986.

Lloréns died on 14 May 2025, at the age of 94.
