= Marie Vaislic =

French Holocaust survivor and writer (1930–2025)

- Born: Marie Rafalovitch; 11 June 1930; Toulouse, France
- Died: 1 May 2025 (aged 94); Toulouse, France
- Occupation: Writer
- Known for: Holocaust testimony

Marie Vaislic (née Rafalovitch; 11 June 1930 – 1 May 2025) was a French Holocaust survivor and writer. She was imprisoned at Ravensbrück and Bergen-Belsen and later gave her testimony in the 2000s.

== Biography ==
Born in Toulouse on 11 June 1930, Vaislic grew up in a family of Polish migrants who had settled in France after unsuccessfully attempting to live in Mandatory Palestine.

On 25 July 1944, Vaislic was arrested in Toulouse, just three weeks before the city's liberation. A neighbor had told the Gestapo about her, even though she herself was unaware of her Jewish lineage. On 30 July 1944, she was deported to Germany out of the Gare de Toulouse-Raynal. The train arrived at Ravensbrück on 9 August 1944. Because she was only 14 years old, she managed to avoid forced labor, though she witnessed the death of her mother at the camp. As the Allies approached, she was transferred to Bergen-Belsen, which made Ravensbrück look like a "paradise" in comparison to her. She was liberated by the British on 15 April 1945.

In 1951, she married Jean Vaislic, himself a Polish Jew who had survived Auschwitz and Buchenwald. In the 2000s, she began giving her testimony about surviving the Holocaust at schools and embassies. She was further motivated to testify after Serge Klarsfeld inaugurated a plaque commemorating her convoy that left the Gare de Toulouse-Raynal on 30 July 1944. In 2014, she published her first autobiography about her survival, titled Seule à quatorze ans à Ravensbrück et Bergen-Belsen ("Alone at Fourteen at Ravensbrück and Bergen-Belsen"). She also gave testimony for the Musée départemental de la Résistance et de la Déportation in Toulouse and for the Mémorial de la Shoah in Paris. In 2024, she wrote her second book, Il n'y aura bientôt plus personne ("There Will Soon No Longer Be Anybody").

Vaislic died in Toulouse on 1 May 2025, at the age of 94.

== Decorations ==
- Knight of the Legion of Honour (2016)
- Commander of the Ordre des Palmes académiques (2024)

== Publications ==
- Seule à quatorze ans à Ravensbrück et Bergen-Belsen (2014)
- Il n'y aura bientôt plus personne (2024)
