= Lola Liivat =

Estonian painter (1928–2025)

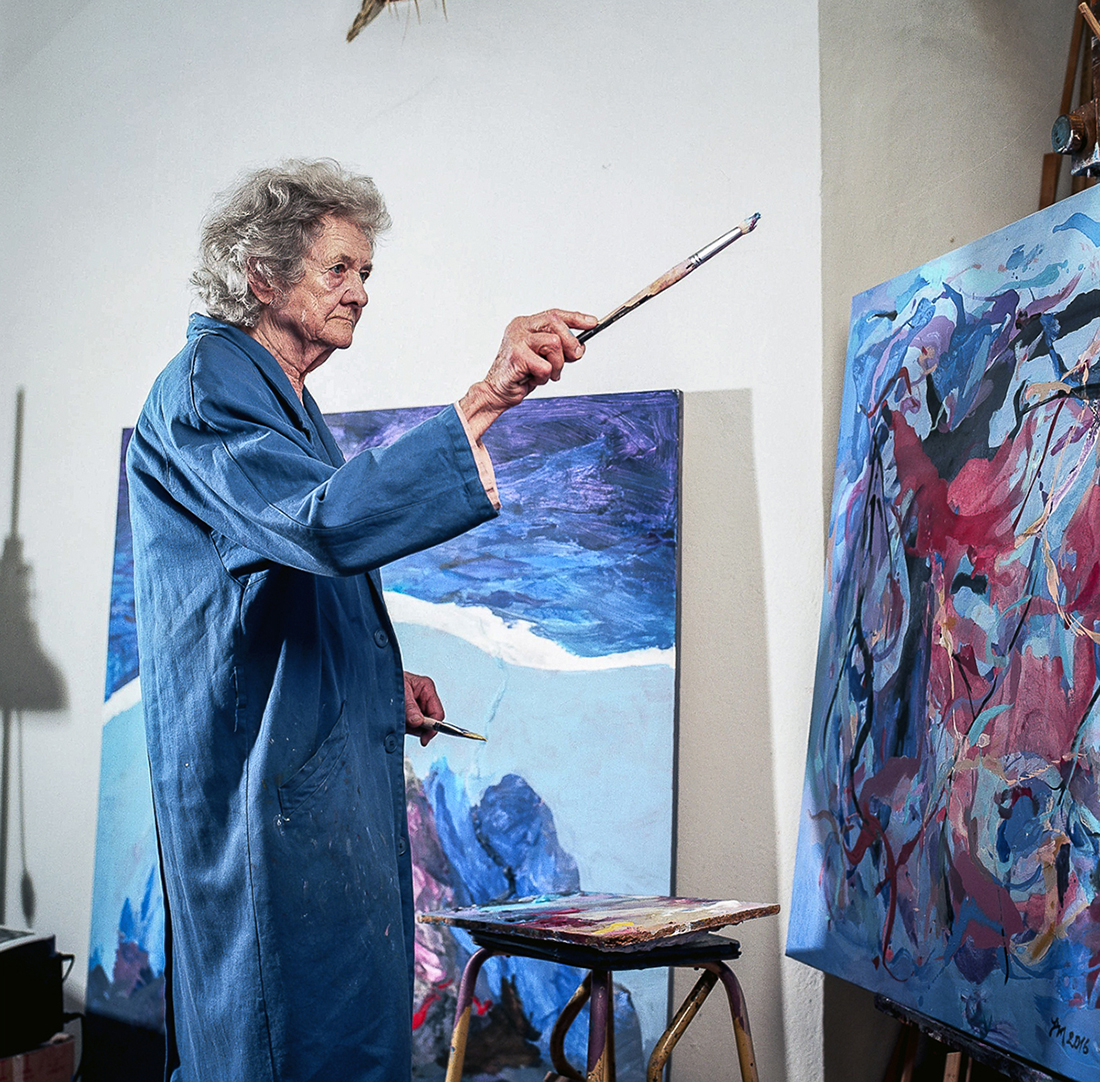
Lola Liivat in 2017

Lola Liivat (17 August 1928 – 6 May 2025) was an Estonian abstract expressionist painter.

In 1954, she graduated from Tartu Art School.

From 1954 on, she exhibited her paintings in Estonia and abroad.

In 2001, she was awarded the Order of the White Star, medal class.

Liivat died on 6 May 2025, at the age of 96.

== Gallery ==
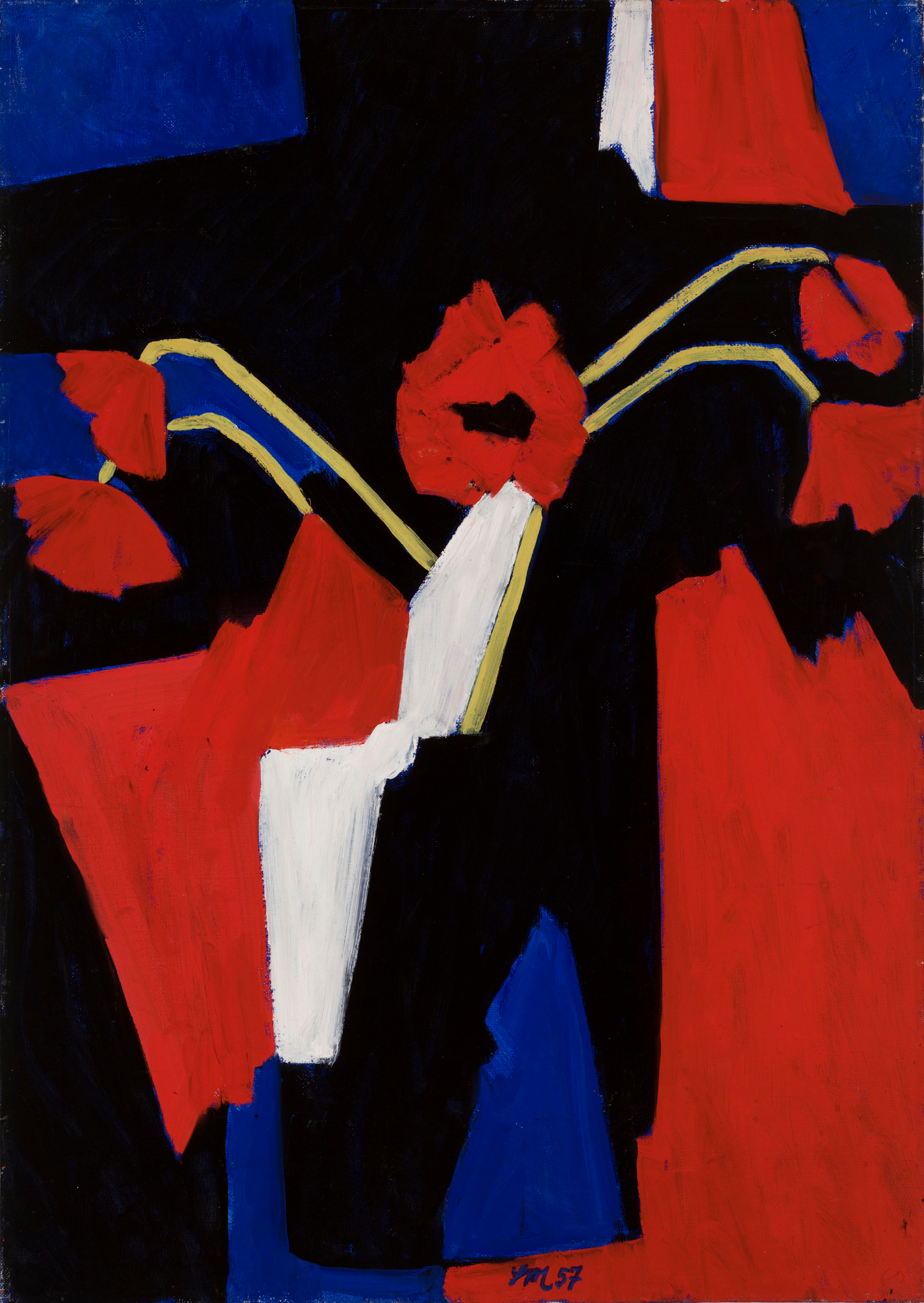
Moonid (1957)

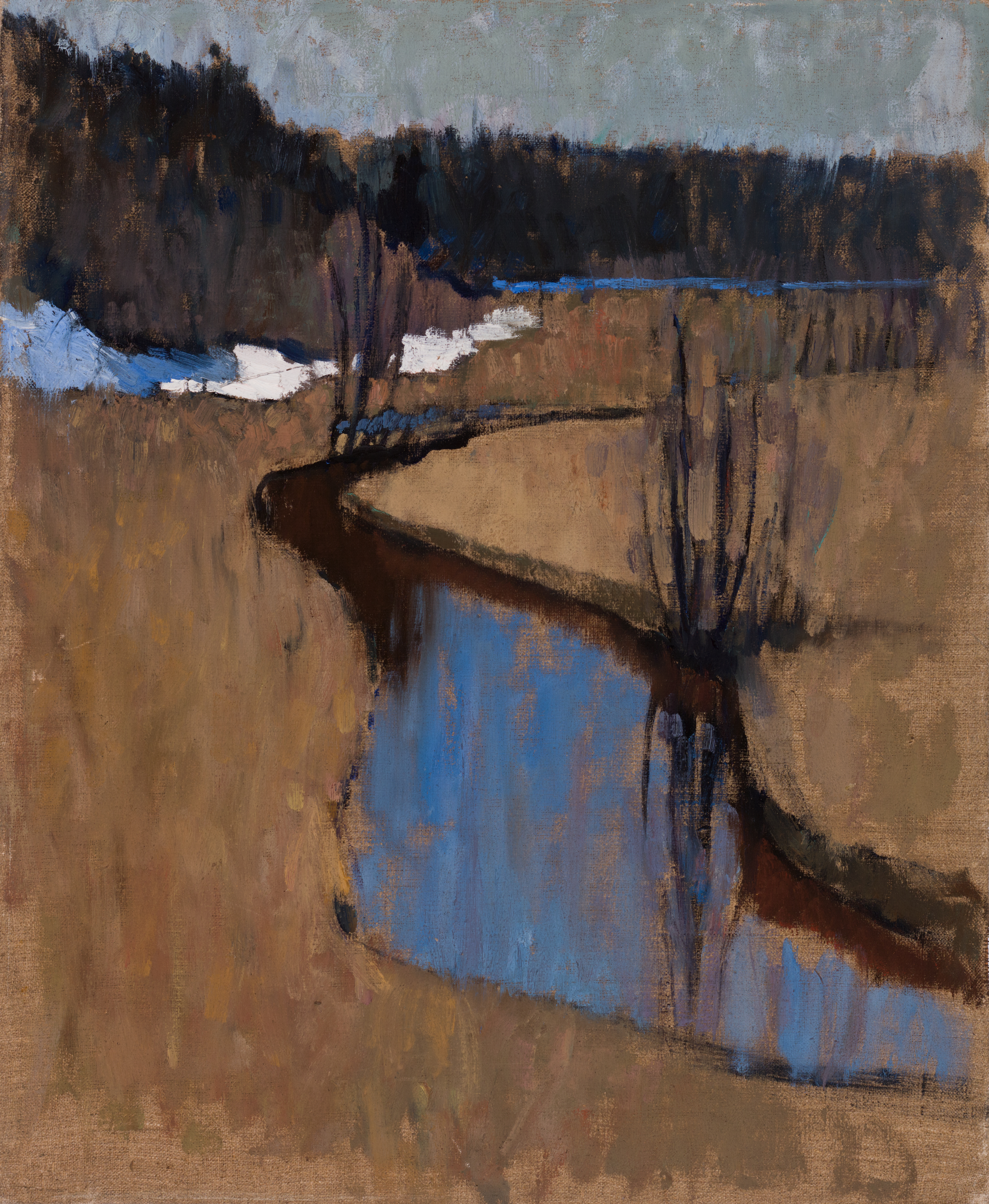
Kevad (1959)

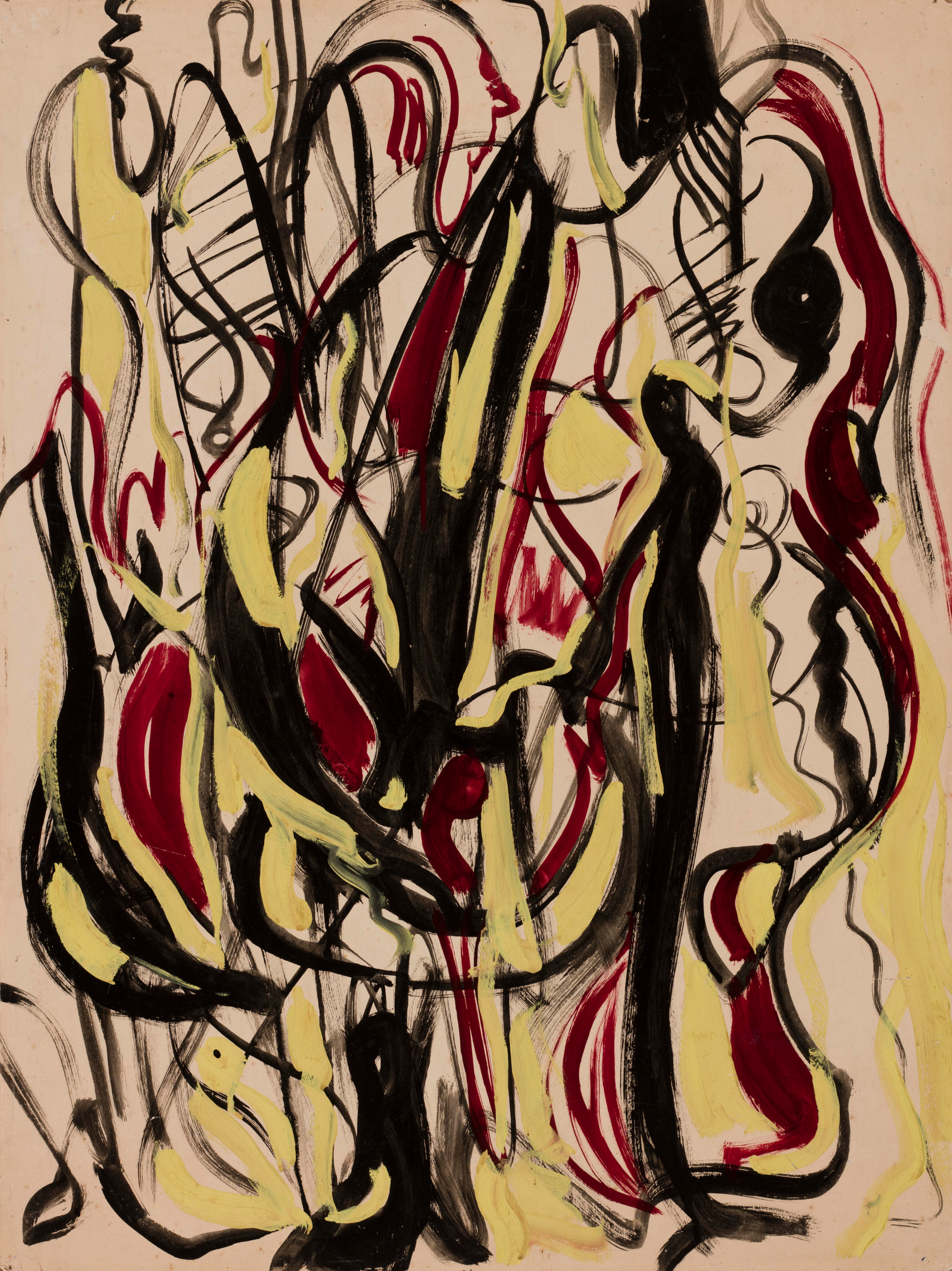
A la Kandinsky (1960)

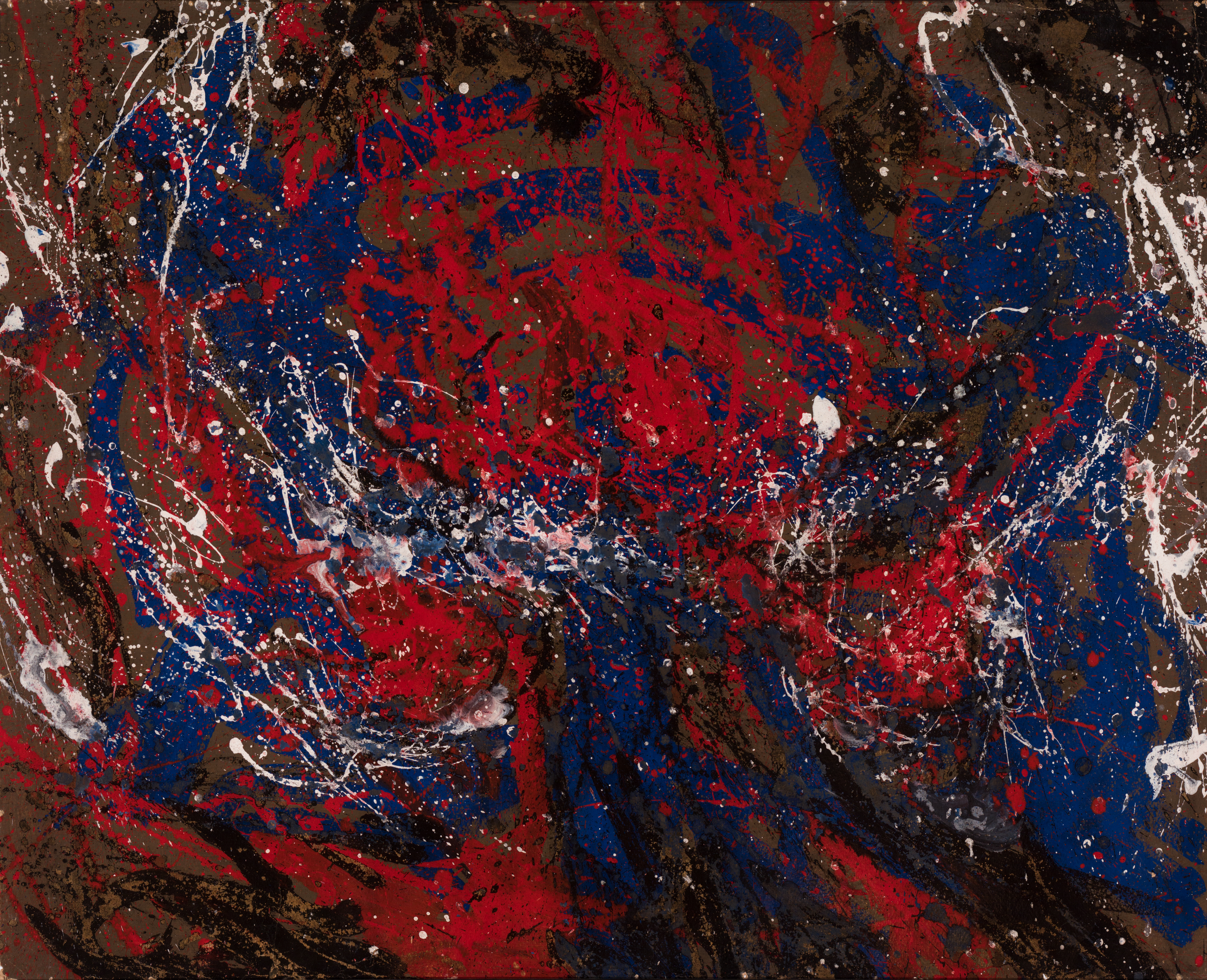
Protestilaul (1962)

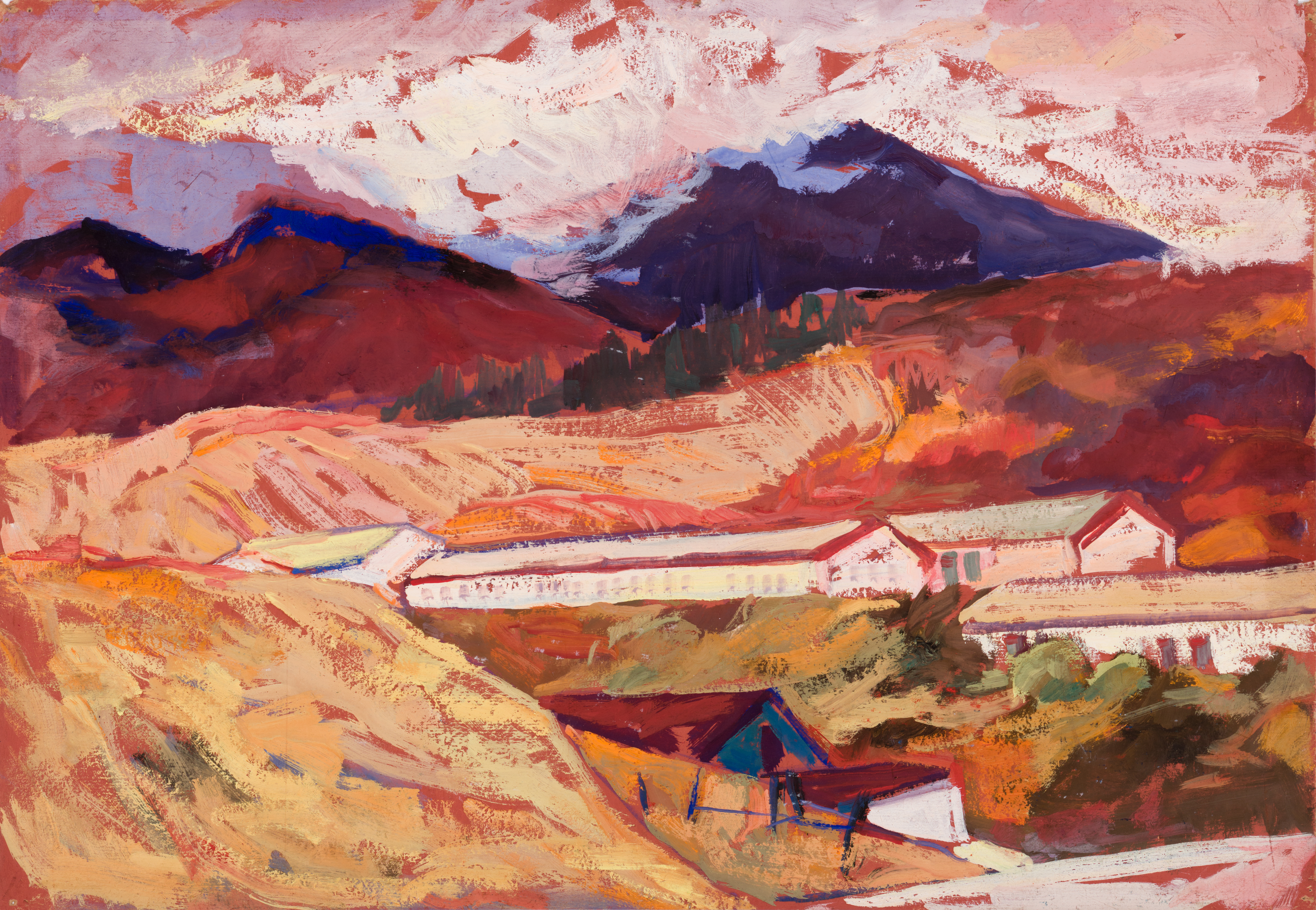
Vaade viinamarjakasvatamise sovhoosile (1963)

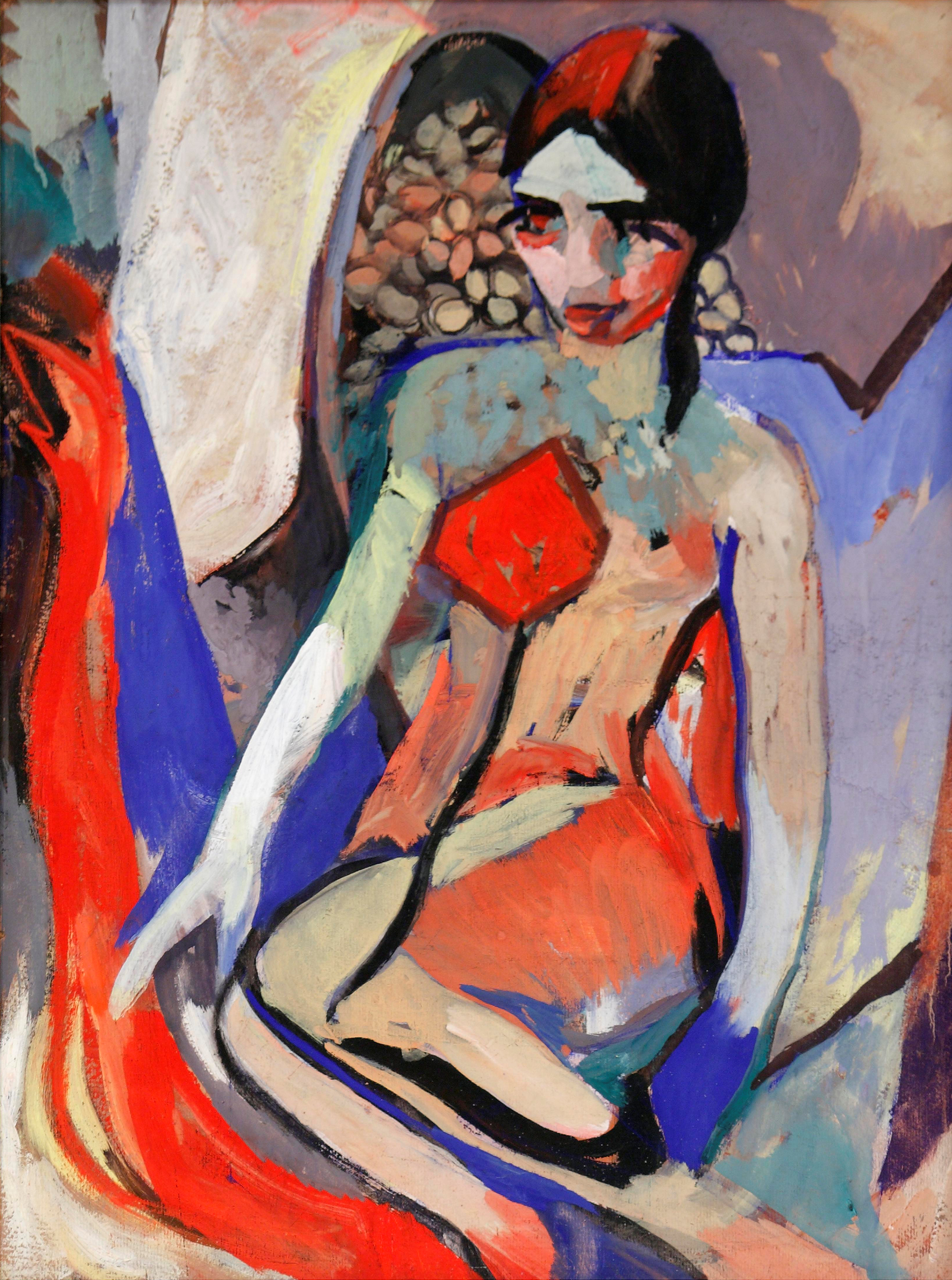
Krimmi pruut (1964)

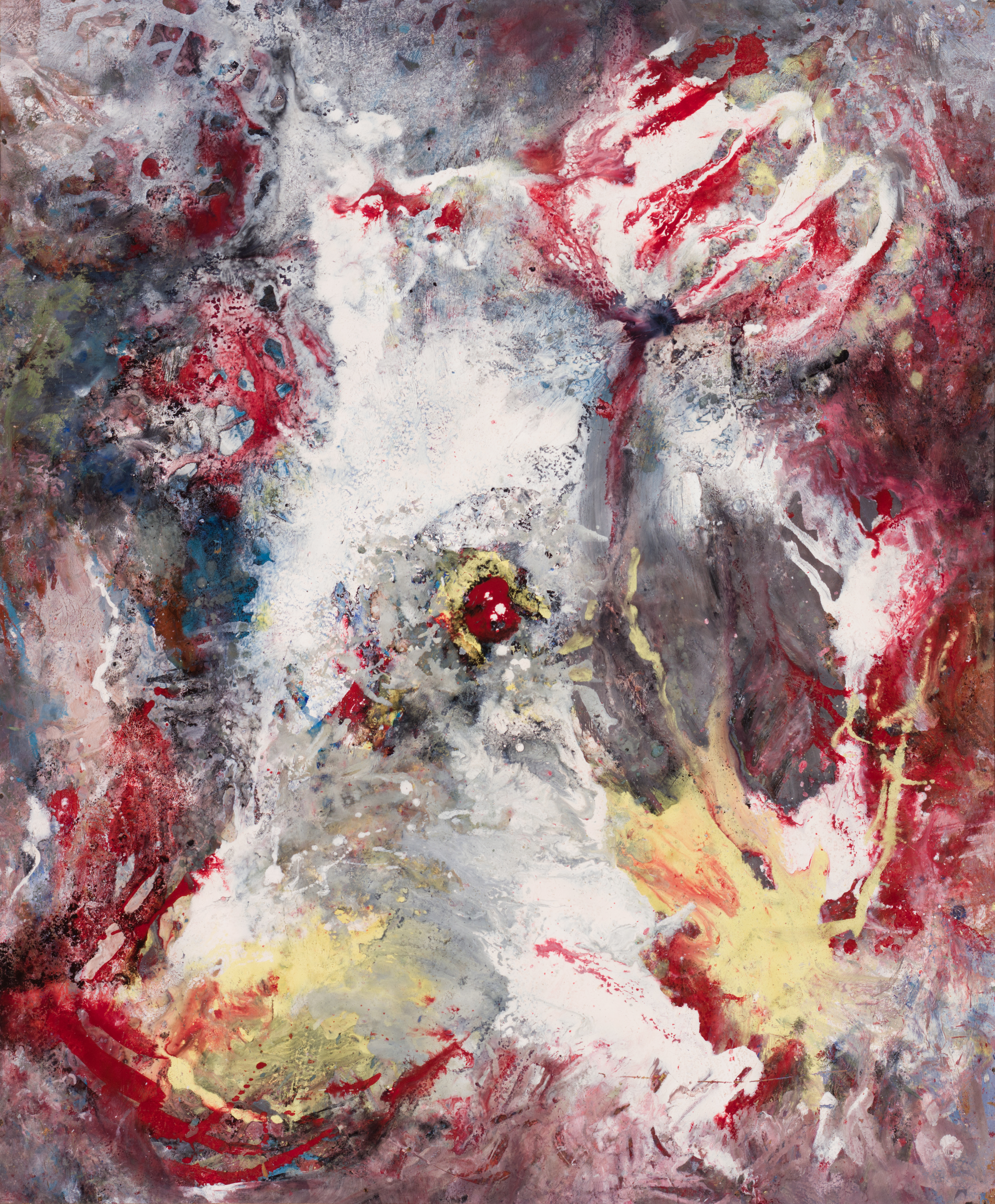
Kevad I (1967)

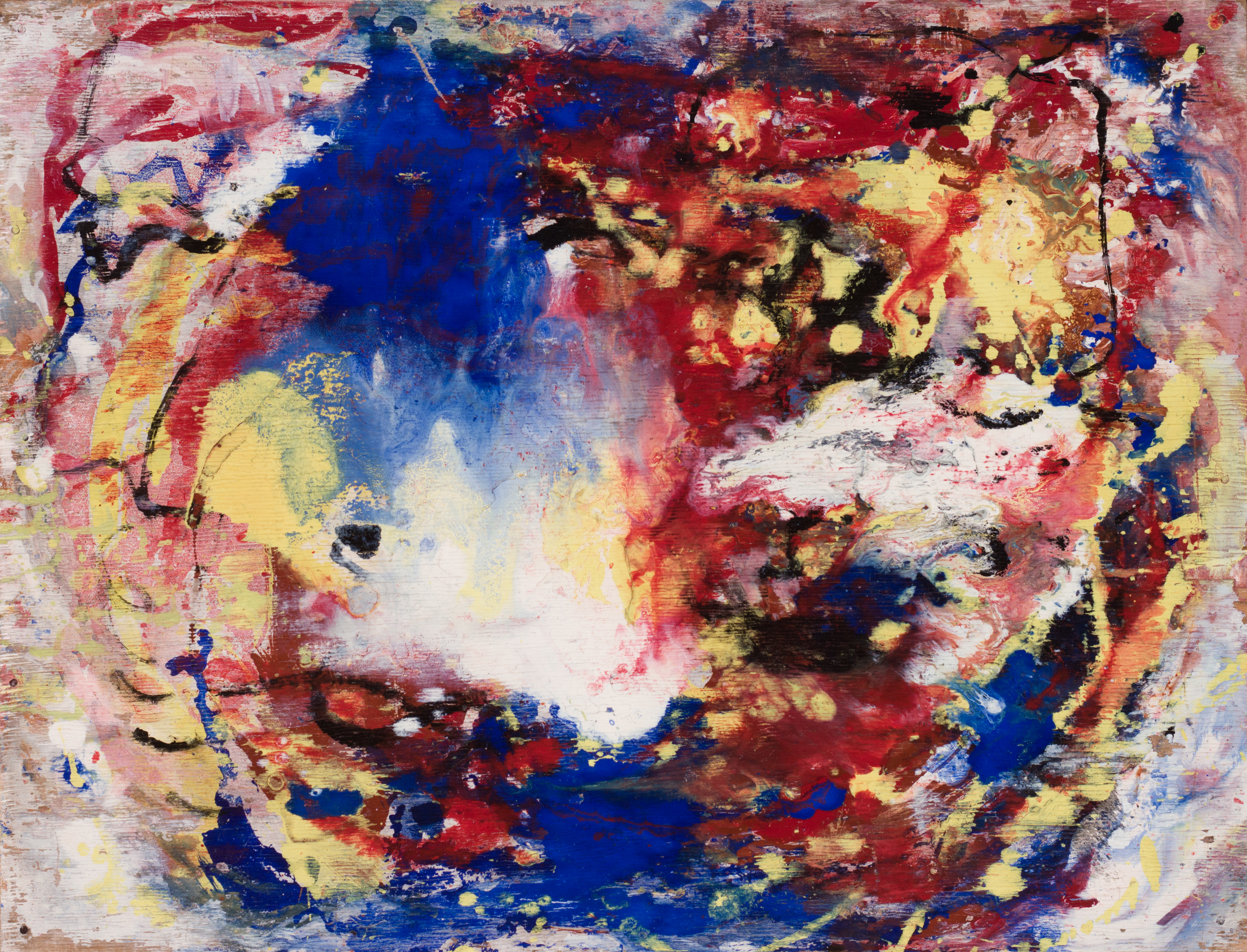
Kompositsioon (1967)

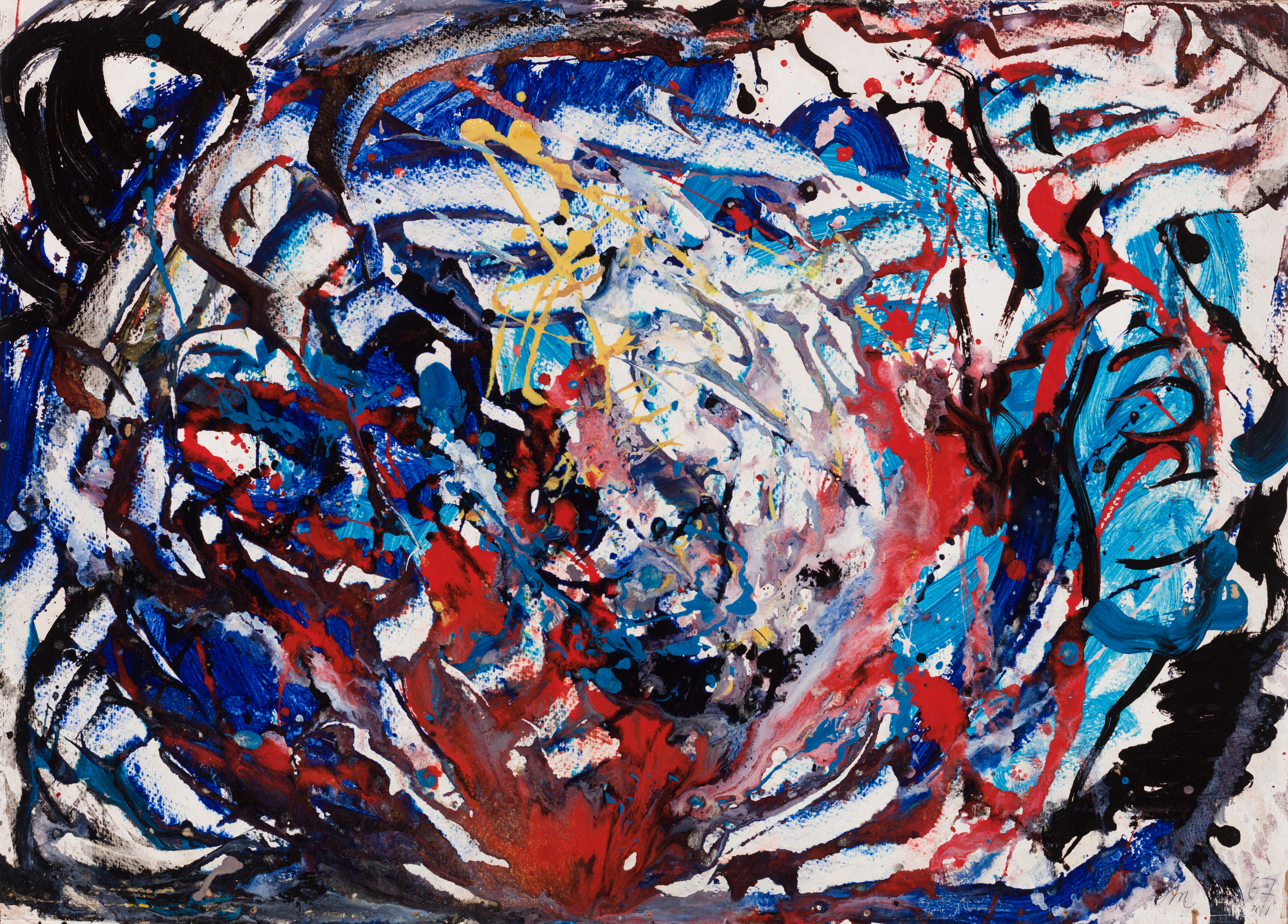
Abstraktsioon (1967)

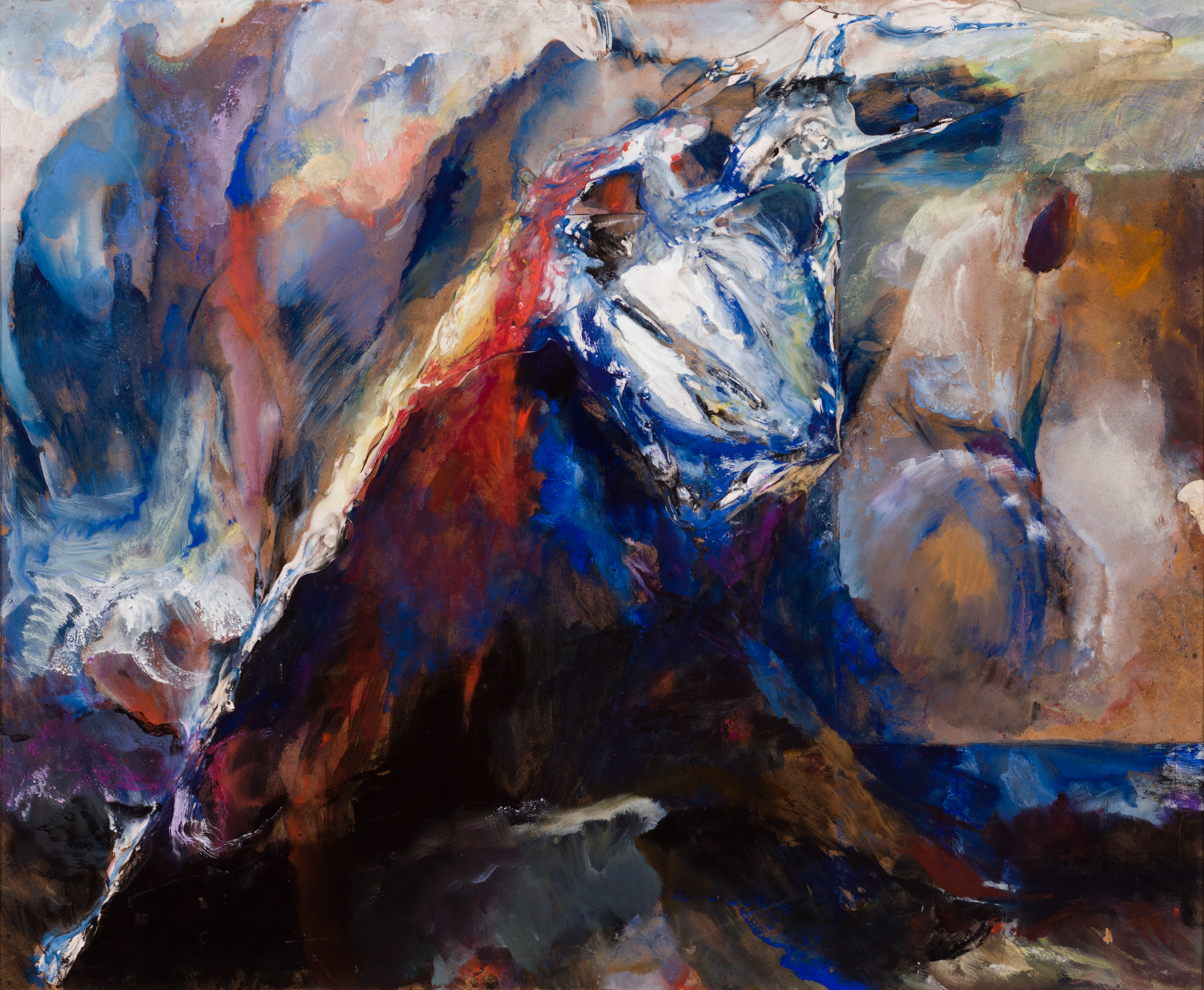
Kompositsioon I (1969)
