= Orien McNeill =

American artist (d. 2025)

Orien McNeill (December 7, 1979 – May 15, 2025) was an American artist. He was a member of the New York City DIY art community. He lived on the Schamonchi, a decommissioned ferry boat. He was the organizer of an annual gathering of homemade boats in Jamaica Bay, called The Battle for Mau Mau Island.
