= Johnnie Walls =

American lawyer and politician (1944/1945–2025)

Johnnie Walls (1944 or 1945 – May 10, 2025) was an American lawyer and politician. He was a member of the Mississippi State Senate from 1993 to 2011. Walls died on May 10, 2025, at the age of 80.
