= Hans Geser =

Swiss sociologist (1947–2025)

Hans Geser (26 March 1947 – 23 May 2025) was a Swiss sociologist.

Geser was a professor at the Heidelberg University from 1983 and was appointed to the University of Zurich in 1986, where he taught at the Sociological Institute until 2012. From 2002 to 2004 he was director of the Sociological Institute.

His research areas included political sociology, sociology of small states, community and party sociology, organizational and professional sociology, and new communication technologies, which is why he was also called the "Internet guru" among scientists.

Geser died on 23 May 2025, at the age of 78.

== Publications ==
Monographs

- Population size and state organization. Habilitation thesis, Peter Lang Verlag, Bern, 1981.
- Structural forms and functional performance of social systems. Westdeutscher Verlag, 1983.
- Local government and administration. Rüegger Verlag, Grüsch, 1987.
- Municipal politics between militia organization and professional administration. Haupt Verlag, Bern/Stuttgart. 1987.
- The Swiss local parties. Seismo Verlag, Zurich, 1994.
- Local Parties in Political and Organizational Perspective. Westview Publishing, Boulder Co. 1999.

Essays

- From Brockhaus to the Worldwide Wiki. In: Herbert Willems (ed.): Worldwide Worlds. Internet Figurations from a Sociological Perspective. VS Verlag für Sozialwissenschaften, Wiesbaden 2008, pp. 119–142.
