= Paquita Tomàs =

Spanish cook and television presenter (1943–2025)

- Born: Francisca Tomàs Suau; 1943; Palma de Mallorca, Spain
- Died: 7 May 2025 (aged 81); Valencia, Spain
- Citizenship: Spanish
- Occupation(s): Chef, television presenter

Francisca Tomàs Suau (1943 – 7 May 2025), better known as Paquita Tomàs, was a Spanish chef and television presenter. She gained recognition for hosting the television program *Sa bona cuina de Paquita Tomàs* on the regional channel IB3.

== Early life and career ==
Francisca Tomàs Suau was born in Palma de Mallorca in 1943. Her rise to fame began in 1998 when she participated in the television program "Un menú de 7 estrellas" on Antena 3, where she won an apartment in the Alicante municipality of Torrevieja. Following this success, she hosted the program "Planta Baixa", which was filmed in her own home and featured live telephone interactions with viewers.

In addition to her television career, Tomàs was an accomplished author of culinary books. Her notable work, *La cuina de sempre amb Paquita Tomàs*, was published in four languages: Catalan, Spanish, English, and German.

== Death ==
Paquita Tomàs died in Valencia on 7 May 2025, after a prolonged illness. She was 81.
