= Alì Rashid =

Jordanian-born Italian politician (1953–2025)

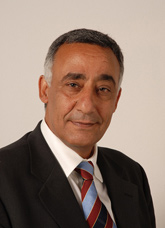
- Rashid in 2006

Member of the Chamber of Deputies of Italy for Umbria
- In office 28 April 2006 – 28 April 2008

Personal details
- Born: 5 April 1953 Amman, Jordan
- Died: 14 May 2025 (aged 72) Orvieto, Italy
- Party: PRC
- Occupation: Journalist

Alì Rashid (5 April 1953 – 14 May 2025) was an Italian politician. A member of the Communist Refoundation Party, he served in the Chamber of Deputies of Italy from 2006 to 2008.

Rashid died in Orvieto on 14 May 2025, at the age of 72.
