= Fred Strutt =

Australian rugby league footballer (1939–2025)

Personal information
- Full name: Frederick James Strutt
- Born: 14 December 1939
- Died: 25 May 2025 (aged 85)

Playing information
- Position: Lock
Club
Years	Team	Pld	T	G	FG	P
1960	St George Dragons	2	0	0	0	0
1963	Eastern Suburbs	15	0	0	0	0
	Total	17	0	0	0	0
Representative
Years	Team	Pld	T	G	FG	P
1961–1962	NSW Country	2	0	0	0	0

Fred Strutt (14 December 1939 – 24 May 2025) was an Australian professional rugby league footballer who played in the New South Wales Rugby League (NSWRL) competition.

Strutt, a lock, began his rugby league career with the St George Dragons in 1960. He played just two matches for the Dragons before moving to Wagga Wagga and playing for Turvey Park where he represented Country Firsts in 1961 and Seconds in 1962 before returning to Sydney to join the Eastern Suburbs club in 1963.

He returned to the country the following year and was selected as Country Firsts captain in 1964 but was ruled out due to injury and also represented Riverina against the touring French that year and Southern Division against New Zealand in 1967.

Strutt is recognized as Eastern Suburbs' 530th player. He played in 15 matches for the Roosters during the 1963 season.
