= Antónia de Sousa =

Portuguese journalist and feminist (1940–2025)

- Born: 22 July 1940; Vila Nova de Gaia, Portugal
- Died: 15 May 2025 (aged 84); Cascais, Portugal

Antónia de Sousa (22 July 1940 – 15 May 2025) was a Portuguese journalist and feminist. She was one of the first women to be part of a newsroom team.

== Career ==
Antónia de Sousa was born in Vila Nova de Gaia, on 22 July 1940, starting work as a journalist at Jornal Feminino, in Porto. She moved to the editorial staff of the Diário de Lisboa, working in the attic, next to the newspaper's archive because she was a woman. She also worked for the women's magazines Modas e Bordados and Flama, and helped found the newspaper A Luta, joining Diário de Notícias in 1979.

A strong defender of women's rights, she developed several reporting programs dedicated to them, for RTP, where she presented the situation and the role of women in Portuguese society.

== Death ==
De Sousa died on 15 May 2025, at the age of 84.
