= Wolfert =

Wolfert may refer to:

== People ==
- Wolfert Acker (1667–1753), Colonial period American featured in Washington Irving's short story collection Wolfert's Roost and Miscellanies (1884)
- Wolfert VI of Borselen (1433–1486), stadholder of Holland, Friesland, and Zeeland, Admiral of the Netherlands outside Flanders, and Lord of Veere
- Wolfert Gerritse van Couwenhoven (1579–1662), founder of the New Netherland colony
- Friedrich Hermann Wölfert (1850–1897), German publisher and aviation pioneer
- Ira Wolfert (1908–1997), American Pulitzer Prize-winning war correspondent and author
- Jeff Wolfert (born 1985), American football kicker
- Jonathan M. Wolfert (born 1952), president of JAM Creative Productions Inc. in Dallas, Texas
- Paula Wolfert (born 1938), American cookbook author
- Sascha Wolfert (born 1990), German footballer

== Places ==
- Wolfert, New Jersey, an unincorporated community in Gloucester County, New Jersey, United States
- Wolfert Tower, a town in Alb-Donau district, Baden-Württemberg, Germany

== See also ==
- Walford
- Welford (disambiguation)
- Wellford (disambiguation)
- Wohlfahrt
- Wolford
- Wolfurt
- Woolford (disambiguation)
