= Washington Irving Memorial =

Memorial in Irvington, New York, United States

- U.S. National Register of Historic Places
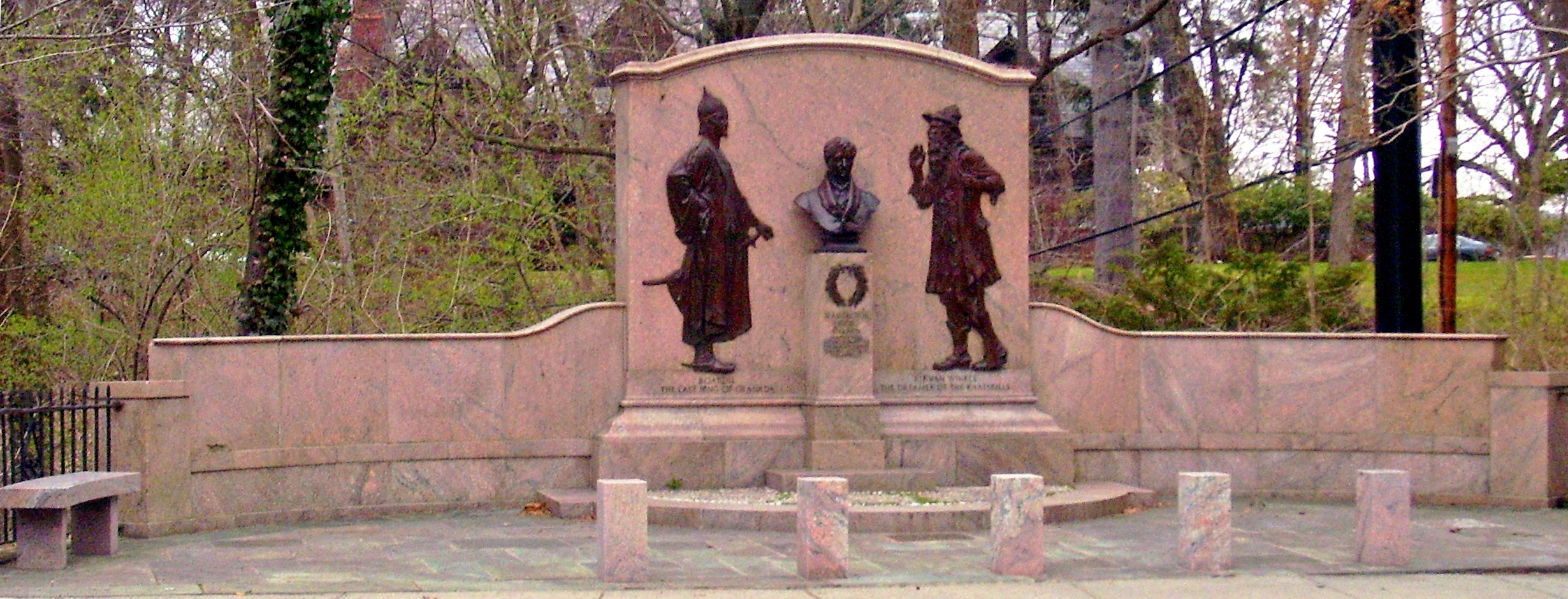
- (2008)
- Location: Irvington, New York
- Nearest city: White Plains
- Coordinates: 41°02′52″N 73°51′41″W
- Area: less than one acre
- Built: 1927
- Architect: Charles A. Platt; Sculpture: Daniel Chester French
- Architectural style: Classical Revival
- NRHP reference No.: 00001062
- Added to NRHP: September 8, 2000

The Washington Irving Memorial is located at Broadway (US 9) and West Sunnyside Lane in Irvington, New York. It features a bust of Irving and sculptures of two of his better-known characters by Daniel Chester French, set in a small stone plaza at the street corner designed by Charles A. Platt. It is near Irving's Sunnyside estate.

A local woman, Jennie Prince Black, pushed for the memorial's creation and construction in 1909, since Sunnyside was then still an Irving family residence closed to the public and his admirers had few places to pay their respects to him. Her dream took almost 20 years to realize. The memorial went through a difficult construction process, passing through several proposed locations and many financial difficulties before it could finally be dedicated in 1927, a year later than originally planned. The opening of Sunnyside since then has led the Irving admirers there instead, but after a major restoration in the late 20th century it remains true to its original design. In 2000, it was added to the National Register of Historic Places.

== Description ==
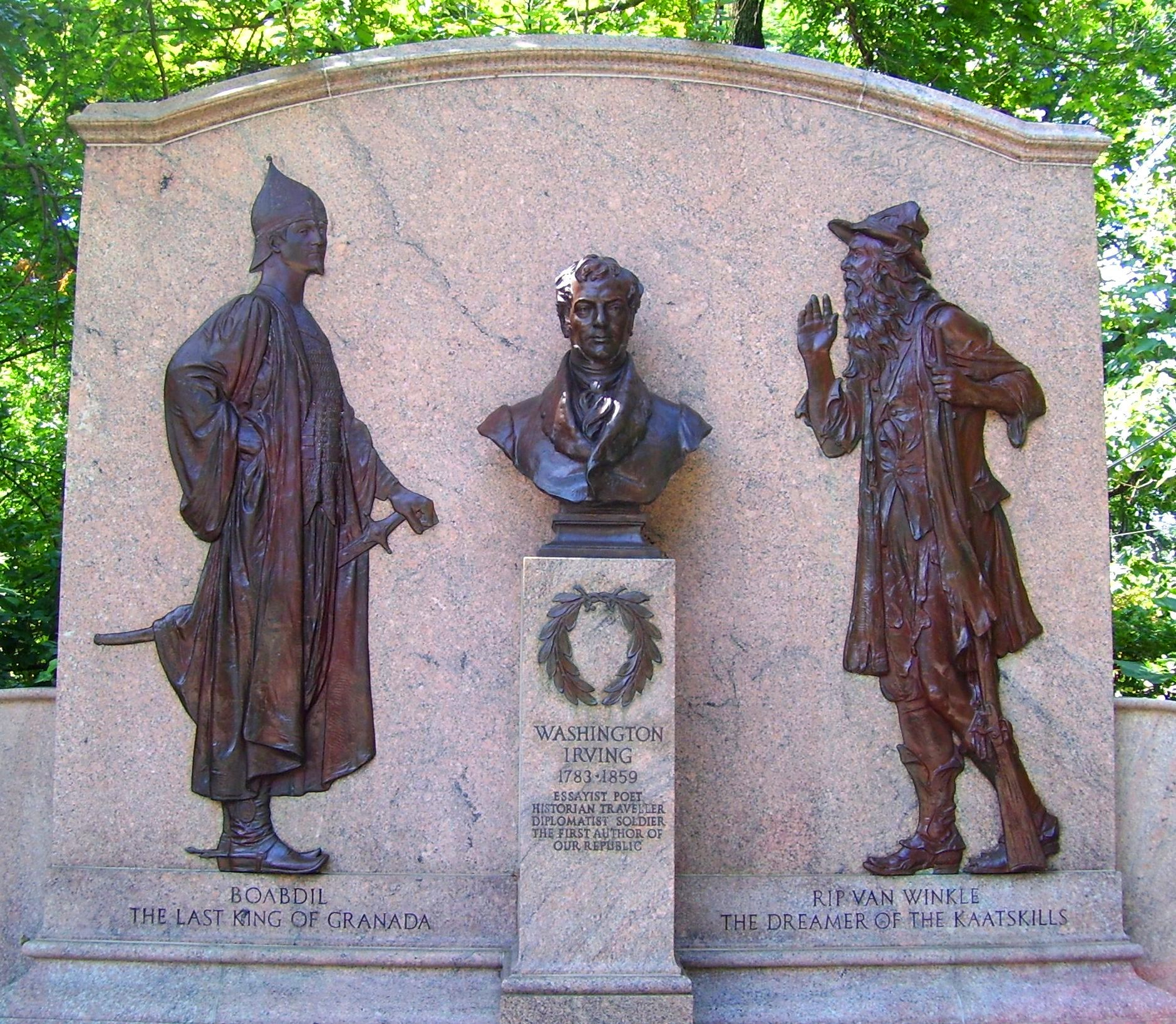
Close-up of the memorial

The memorial sits on a small triangle of land at the southwest corner of the junction, which marks the northern end of Irvington. Sunnyside Creek, a small tributary of the nearby Hudson River, flows through a culvert underneath and lends a sloping, wooded character to the land behind the memorial.

It consists of three parts: a tall central panel 10 feet (3.0 m) high and eight feet (2.4 m) wide, bronze sculptures of two of Irving's characters, Rip Van Winkle and King Boabdil, flanking a bust of the author on a six-foot (1.8 m) pedestal. Curved wing walls four feet (1.2 m) high and twelve feet (3.7 m) long come out on either side, further extended by ten feet (3.0 m) of wrought iron fencing. All the stone is pink Vermont granite with dark veins. An inscription carved in the center memorializes Irving's multiple careers, and identifies the two characters depicted at his sides.

In front of the panel are several square stone piers intended to support benches that were never built. Two were added later at the sides. The surface of the memorial area was once flagstone; today most of it has been replaced in concrete. Piers at the north end were built for a gate and path to the brook that was never built.

== History ==
The construction of the memorial was beset by financial problems, complicated site issues and delays. Its location was not ideal for such a project, and was not finally settled until a year before it was finished. Its original budget grew despite intensive fundraising efforts, and even so French was never fully paid for his work. Issues persisted even after it was formally dedicated.

=== Concept ===
During his lifetime, Irving – revered as America's first great writer – regularly received visitors and admirers at Sunnyside. His family closed the house after his death, and those who still wished to pay homage had to settle for his grave at Sleepy Hollow Cemetery near the Old Dutch Church of Sleepy Hollow and pew at Christ Episcopal Church, both located two miles (3.2 km) up the road in Tarrytown.

At Irvington's ceremonies marking the 50th anniversary of his death in 1909, resident Jennie Prince Black, a composer and the wife of printing magnate Harry Van Deventer Black, realized the village needed a permanent memorial to the man it had renamed itself after. Plans for a tower in Tarrytown in the late 19th century had never come to fruition. She credited "an inner voice" and continued to advocate for the memorial for years without success. In 1924, Cyrus West Field, another Irvington resident, put her in touch with sculptor Daniel Chester French. The involvement of America's top sculptor made Black's dream a reality. He was commissioned to design the memorial that summer, while the newly formed Washington Irving Memorial Association began looking for a site and raising money to buy the land.

=== Siting difficulties ===
French's design came together quickly; buying the land was the hard part. Black wanted the memorial to be on Broadway, in full view of traffic on the busy Albany Post Road. She had hoped at first to locate the memorial at what became its ultimate site, but was rebuffed both by the difficult topography of the site and the Irving family's unwillingness to sell the land out of fears a memorial would attract visitors. She turned next to the churches, and despite French's concern that it would be too close to the street was making some progress when she learned that an unnamed vestryman of one of the churches had been objecting to the idea of a memorial on the grounds of either church. A property facing Irvington's Main Street was considered next but the owners would not consent. Finally, the Irvings were moved by these difficulties to reconsider their original reservations. A neighbor of theirs, Henry Graves, donated the triangular parcel, and the memorial association began a subscription drive.

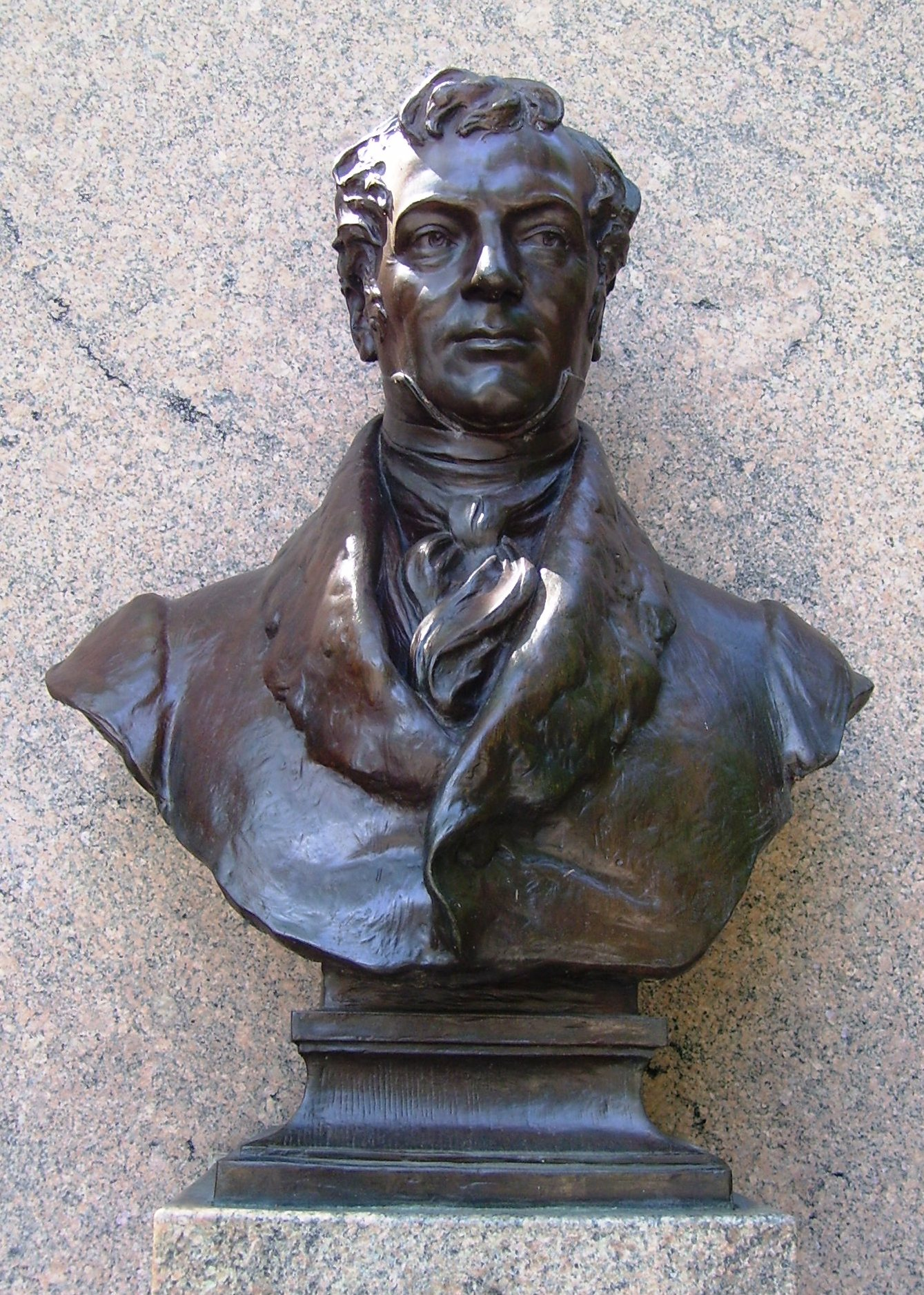
Irving as depicted by French

Meanwhile, French had decided to represent Irving in his prime, at the age of 35, before he had come to live in the area. He collected drawings of the author to ensure as accurate a representation as possible. Similarly, he asked Frank Jefferson, the son of Joseph Jefferson, who had become famous playing Van Winkle on stage, for photographs of his late father in the part.

His decision to use Boabdil as the other character, to show the range of Irving's work, met with some controversy when he sent the memorial association a plaster cast of his work, after he had sent site architect Charles A. Platt a plan. Another of Black's wealthy local acquaintances, the publisher George H. Putnam, himself a biographer of Irving, complained that French should have chosen another local character from Irving's work, like Peter Stuyvesant and that Boabdil was not even a major character in Irving's The Alhambra. Black brought this up with him, but the sculptor reminded her that he was the artist and it was his privilege to decide how to memorialize Irving in bronze. He consulted with his friend Bashford Dean, curator of arms and armor at the Metropolitan Museum of Art as to what the Moorish king would have worn. While Dean did not feel what French ultimately chose was historically accurate, he, too, agreed it was ultimately a matter of artistic license.

=== Financial problems ===
By the spring of 1925, the association had raised $8,000, but the total cost of the memorial was now projected to reach $30,000, half of which was French's fee. In July he told Black the bust of Irving was nearing completion and that he would have all the work ready in time to open and dedicate the memorial in 1926. Black continued raising money, securing at one point a $5,000 contribution from another wealthy area resident, John D. Rockefeller, on the condition that a matching $25,000 be raised. Soon afterwards it was reported that $16,000 had been raised, from yet other local citizens of means such as Adolph Ochs and Chauncey Depew. A scroll with the names of 400 who donated was placed in a locked box and buried at the monument site.

French presented a mockup of his final work to Black in January 1926. "You have outdone us all a thousandfold", she said to him. Costs for the memorial continued to rise as it became more elaborate, and French became involved in fundraising, putting his plaster model of the Irving bust on display in his New York studio to draw attention to the project and entering it in exhibitions. It was sent to the Gorham Company's bronze works in Providence to be cast in April.

Back in Irvington, Black and the memorial association, equally concerned about costs, which were now reaching $50,000, again contacted the churches in Tarrytown, where the site was flatter. French, who preferred the churches over Sunnyside Lane, and Platt both produced modified plans, but legal complications blocked the move in June. The sculptor told Black it would be impossible to get the memorial done by fall and suggested its completion be postponed to spring 1927, which would also allow more time for fundraising.

In August, the statues were finished and placed in storage. Black organized two fundraising events in the fall, one of them an elaborate pantomime pageant of Irving's works at Sunnyside starring many locals, but was devastated when they raised only $1,000, far short of what was necessary. French again decided to help out by creating, at his expense, an 18-inch (46 cm) version of his Rip Van Winkle statue that the association could duplicate and sell for $500. The funding shortfalls resulted in the memorial being scaled back as construction approached: the landscaping and front benches were canceled and the fencing made less elaborate.

=== Construction and dedication ===
In the late fall, Ernest Behrens was paid $5,000 for site work, clearing a telephone booth and telephone pole from the site and pouring concrete. In the spring, Piccirilli Brothers, a New York stonecarving firm, was paid $14,360 to install the memorial. On June 24, they reported that, despite faulty foundation work and other issues they said should have been addressed prior to construction, the memorial was ready except for the bronze lettering, which didn't fit in the grooves cut in the rock.

Three days later, on June 26, 1927, the memorial was finally opened and dedicated despite these unresolved issues. Irving's great-great-nephew pulled aside the flag that draped it, and a local schoolchildren's choir sang and trumpeters performed. French's work was well received. One local newspaper columnist called it "chaste, dignified and altogether lovely", noting how it drew the viewer from characters to author rather than the other way around.

=== Later history ===
Gorham denied any responsibility for the lettering problem, claiming it had only followed French's blueprints. New letters were cast and installed in October. French was still owed $5,000; by the time of the last entry related to the Irving memorial in his account book, two years later, he had been paid $14,500, $500 short of his original fee.

After the completion of the memorial, no further work was done. The Rockefeller family bought Sunnyside from the Irving family in 1945, restored it and opened it to the public as a historic house museum in 1947, eliminating the original need for the memorial.

In 1985, a cleaning project restored the original appearance of much of the stonework and bronze, and in the late 1990s the original flagstone flooring was replaced with concrete, since the memorial and its benches had come to be used as a waiting area for local bus service. New York's Department of Transportation installed a standard at the corner to support a traffic light, essentially recreating the obstruction to the view of the memorial by southbound traffic that the original designers had hoped was gone with the removal of the telephone pole.

== See also ==
- Public sculptures by Daniel Chester French
- National Register of Historic Places listings in southern Westchester County, New York
