= Wellford =

Wellford may refer to:

== Places ==
United States

- Wellford, South Carolina
- Wellford, West Virginia

== People ==
- Alexander Wellford (1911–1994), American tennis player
- Beverly R. Wellford (1797–1870), American physician
- Charles Wellford, American criminologist
- Charles Wellford Leavitt (1871–1928), American architect
- Harry W. Wellford (1924–2021), American judge and lawyer
- R. Carter Wellford (1853–1919), American politician

== See also ==
- Welford (disambiguation)
