= Historic Hudson Valley =

Educational and historic preservation organization

Historic Hudson Valley is a not-for-profit educational and historic preservation organization headquartered in Tarrytown, New York. The organization gives tours and hosts events at four historic properties in Westchester County, in the lower Hudson River Valley.

== Sites ==
Historic Hudson Valley operates four historic sites in Westchester County, all of which are open for public tours:

- Philipsburg Manor House, in Sleepy Hollow.
- Washington Irving's Sunnyside, in Tarrytown.
- Union Church of Pocantico Hills, in Pocantico Hills.
- Van Cortlandt Manor, in Croton-on-Hudson.

Historic Hudson Valley also operated Kykuit, the Rockefeller estate in Pocantico Hills, owned by the National Trust for Historic Preservation, until tours were put on hiatus in January 2026.

== History ==
=== Initial acquisitions ===
John D. Rockefeller Jr. founded Sleepy Hollow Restorations in 1951 as a non-profit educational institution chartered in the state of New York. Now known as Historic Hudson Valley, it continues to operate under the same charter.

Rockefeller, who had a life-long philanthropic interest in the restoration and preservation of places of historic importance, had previously provided funding for several such projects, most notably the establishment of Colonial Williamsburg in the late 1920s.

In 1945, Rockefeller purchased Sunnyside, the home of early 19th-century author Washington Irving, from Irving's collateral descendants. In 1950, Rockefeller arranged transfer of title of the Philipsburg Manor House (which had been operated by the Historic Society of the Tarrytowns) to Sleepy Hollow Restorations. In 1953, he acquired Van Cortlandt Manor, and brought a team of historians and architects from Colonial Williamsburg to restore it.

Rockefeller saw in all three sites, when combined, the potential to educate the public about the history and culture of the Hudson River Valley, and having underwritten their purchase and restoration, he established Sleepy Hollow Restorations to assure their long-term preservation and continued public access.

=== Expansion ===
In 1984, Sleepy Hollow Restorations acquired title to the Union Church of Pocantico Hills which contains stained glass windows by French artists Henri Matisse and Marc Chagall, given to the church by members of the Rockefeller family.

In 1986, Sleepy Hollow Restorations acquired Montgomery Place, an historic house in Dutchess County, part of a strategy to expand the organization's influence in the Hudson River Valley beyond Westchester County. The geographic expansion inspired the organization to change its name the following year to Historic Hudson Valley.

In January 2016, Historic Hudson Valley sold Montgomery Place to Bard College, returning to its original Westchester County mandate, while retaining its new name.

Kykuit, the Rockefeller estate in Pocantico Hills, had been left to the National Trust for Historic Preservation in the will of Governor Nelson A. Rockefeller, who died in 1979. The Rockefeller Brothers Fund leased the property from the National Trust, and in 1991, entered into a partnership with Historic Hudson Valley to operate a program of public tours, which began in 1994.

In 1992, Historic Hudson Valley's IRS status changed from that of a private foundation to a public, not-for-profit organization.

== Governing board ==
A volunteer board of trustees governs the organization, which funds its operation through visitor admission and membership fees, annual fundraising, and an annual draw from its largely unrestricted endowment. Waddell W. Stillman is the president.

== Educational mission ==
Historic Hudson Valley focuses its work on three key areas:

=== Guided tours ===
Tours at Philipsburg Manor, Sunnyside, and Van Cortlandt Manor use the third-person "living history" approach by interpreters in historic clothing supplemented by hands-on demonstrations of period work and leisure activities, while Kykuit and the Union Church use a more traditional lecture/discussion approach. Philipsburg Manor concentrates on telling the story of slavery in the colonial north. Sunnyside focuses on Washington Irving and the Romantic movement in 19th-century literature, landscape, and architecture. At Van Cortlandt Manor, themed-tours concentrate on interpreting the history and lifestyles of the New Nation period following the conclusion of the American Revolution.

=== School programs ===
Historic Hudson Valley offers a varied menu of school workshops developed with teachers and based on state curriculum requirements.

=== Special events ===
Special events focus on issues and ideas that are season-specific or that require a fuller programmatic rendering than is possible on the standard tour. For example:

- CORNucopia, held at the end of summer in Sleepy Hollow, NY, is an annual "festival at Philipsburg Manor celebrating the importance of corn and its heritage in America".
- Dickens's 'Christmas Carol', held annually at the Old Dutch Church of Sleepy Hollow at Christmastime, is a performance wherein a "master storyteller, Jonathan Kruk, complete with musical accompaniment, regales you with his adaptation of Charles Dickens’s “A Christmas Carol.”
- Pinkster is an annual re-creation of the 18th-century African-Colonial festival of Pentecost, through which visitors can explore African music, dance, foodways, and storytelling.
- Sheep-to-Shawl, held every April at Philipsburg Manor in Sleepy Hollow, NY, celebrates, "From fiber to fashion, [...] all things wooly sheep! Visitors are invited to explore each step in the process of turning wool into cloth using 18th-century techniques." Additionally, "Hands-on activities include dyeing wool and crafts for children, including a giant 20-foot diameter weaving project!", and "Outside on the grounds, Scottish border collies display their skills at sheep- and duck-herding. Visitors are invited to enjoy a fashion show, Project Colonial Runway, and kick up their heels to the sounds of a live bluegrass band."
- The Great Jack O’Lantern Blaze and Horseman's Hollow explore traditions linked to "The Legend of Sleepy Hollow" and contemporary ways of observing the traditions of Halloween. Additionally, Irving's Legend, held annually at the Old Dutch Church of Sleepy Hollow every autumn, is a performance wherein "Master storytellers Jonathan Kruk and Jim Keyes offer dramatic performances of Washington Irving’s classic tale, featuring the Headless Horseman, Ichabod Crane, Brom Bones, and Katrina Van Tassel. Flavored with live spooky music, the spellbinding storytelling captivates all audiences."

== See also ==
- National Trust for Historic Preservation
