= Woolford =

Woolford may refer to:

== Surnames ==
- Bianca Woolford (born 1991), Australian para-cyclist
- Cyril Woolford (1927–2018), English rugby league player
- Donnell Woolford (born 1966), American professional football player
- Gary Woolford (born 1954), former professional American footballer
- Jamie Woolford (born 1974), American producer, recording engineer and songwriter
- Joe Woolford, half of Joe & Jack
- John Woolford (disambiguation)
- Julian Woolford (contemporary), British theater director and writer
- Keo Woolford (1967–2016), American actor and director
- Martyn Woolford (born 1985), English footballer
- Paul Woolford (DJ), British dance music producer and DJ
- Paul Woolford (field hockey) (born 1977), New Zealand field hockey player
- Simon Woolford (born 1975), Australian rugby league player

== Placenames ==
- Woolford, Alberta, Canada
- Woolford, Maryland, United States

== See also ==
- Woolfords
- Woolford Farm
- Woolford's Water
