= Welford =

Welford may refer to:

== Places ==
Australia

- Welford National Park, a national park

England

- Welford, Berkshire, a village and parish
  - RAF Welford, a military airbase
  - Welford Park, a country house
- Welford, Northamptonshire, a village and parish
  - Welford Reservoir
- Welford-on-Avon, Warwickshire, a village and parish
- Welford Road Stadium, Leicester, home ground of the Leicester Tigers rugby union club

== Other uses ==
- Welford (surname)

== See also ==
- Wellford (disambiguation)
- Whelford, a village in Gloucestershire, England
