= Romer-Van Tassel House =

Historic house in New York, United States

- U.S. National Register of Historic Places
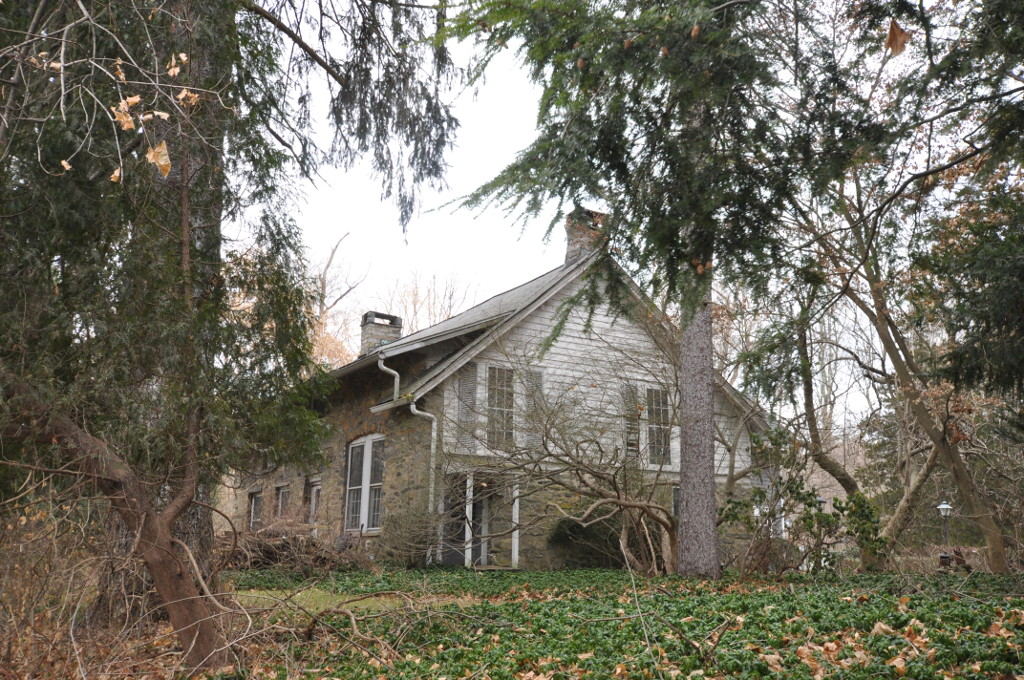

- Location within New York Location within the United States
- Location: 2121 Saw Mill River Rd., Greenburgh, New York
- Coordinates: 41°2′39″N 73°49′40″W
- Area: 4 acres (1.6 ha)
- Built: 1793
- Architectural style: Colonial
- NRHP reference No.: 94001373
- Added to NRHP: November 25, 1994

Romer-Van Tassel House is a historic home located at 2121 Saw Mill River Road in Elmsford, Town of Greenburgh, Westchester County, New York. It was built in 1793 on the site of an older Romer family house; that house and the Romer family were associated with the capture of John André in 1780.

In 1793, John Romer married Leah Van Tassel. The Van Tassels were descendants of early Dutch settlers and ardent Patriots whose house was burned by the Hessians during the Revolutionary War. John and his father-in-law built a large new house, which became the shared home of the Romer and Van Tassel families. From 1793 into the early 19th century, the house also served as a community meeting center for Greenburgh, before a dedicated town hall was built.

The house is a 1 1/2-story, rectangular stone dwelling, topped by a gable roof. The coursed stone foundation may be the remains of the previous dwelling and dates to about 1684. The house was renovated in the 1920s, and the 1 1/2-story wood-frame kitchen wing dates to that time.

It was added to the National Register of Historic Places in 1994.

== See also ==
- National Register of Historic Places listings in southern Westchester County, New York
