= Hulda of Bohemia =

Legendary 18th-century American woman

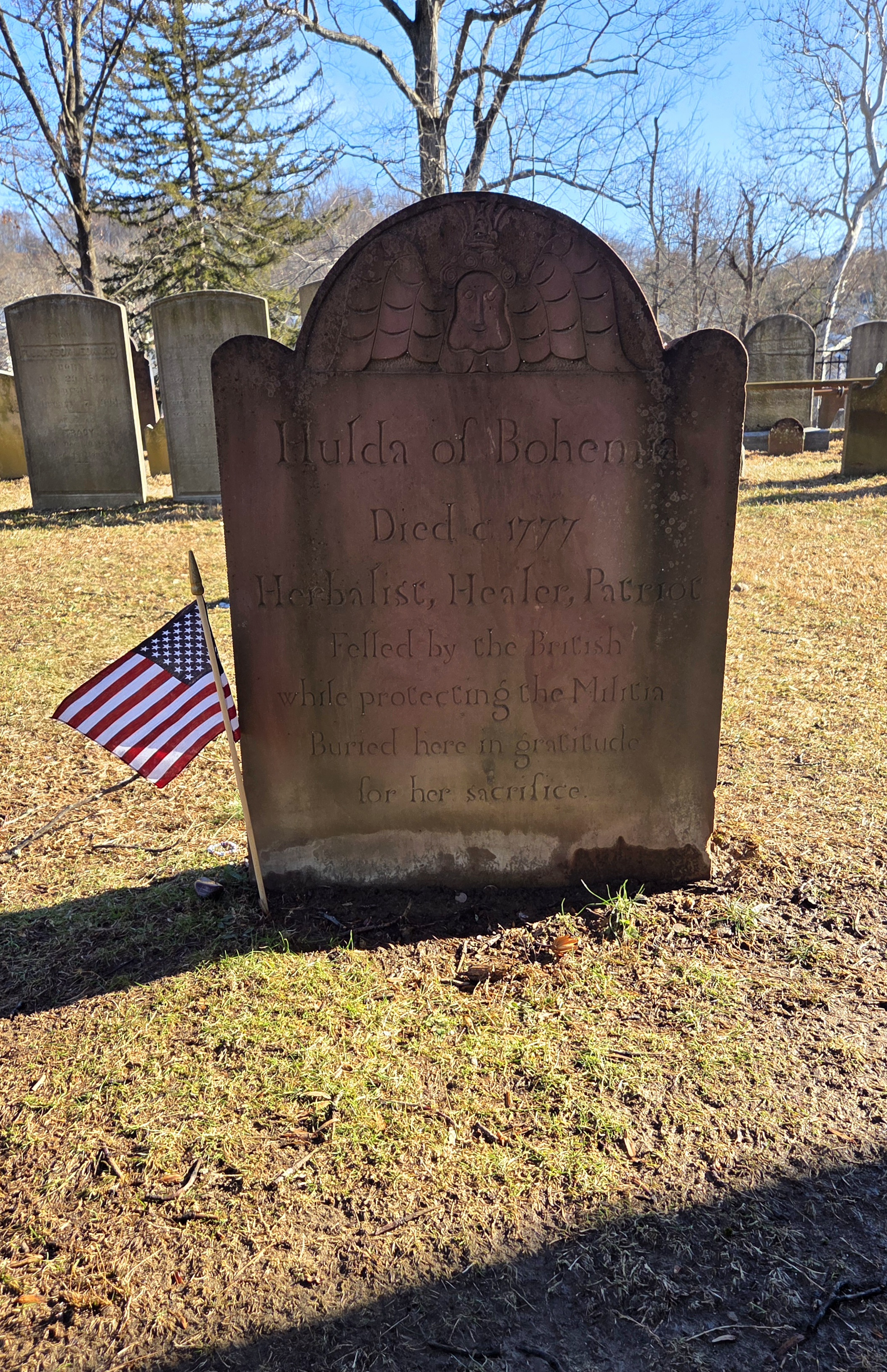
2019 tombstone of Hulda of Bohemia

Hulda of Bohemia is a legendary woman who is said to have lived in colonial Sleepy Hollow, New York.

== Legend ==
There is no primary source that proves Hulda actually existed.

Her story was first published in the book Chronicles of Tarrytown and Sleepy Hollow by Edgar Mayhew Bacon, in a chapter titled "Myths and Legends". She was an immigrant from Bohemia (now in the Czech Republic), who settled in Sleepy Hollow, New York. Her cottage is said to have been "full of the sweet odor of plants drying; specifics for colds and fevers and the unsophisticated pains and aches of simple folk". It is placed not far from Spook Rock, which is a real place in Rockefeller State Park Preserve.

Bacon attests that during times of scarcity, residents would find food left by unknown person on their doorsteps, with Hulda being the source. While known to locals, she was a pariah due to her foreign origin, lack of husband, and a belief that she was a witch who practiced dark magic.

During the American Revolutionary War, the British marched into the area to confront the troops of Israel Putnam at Peekskill, Hulda joined members of the area in a skirmish with the soldiers. Bacon wrote that "she was singled out for vengeance” and was killed by them. After her death, a Bible was found in her home along with gold to be given to widows of soldiers who died in the war. Members of the town reportedly gave her a Christian burial.

== Legacy ==
Hulda is believed by some to be the inspiration for the "High German Doctor" whose "drowsy, dreamy influence seems to hang over the land" in the The Legend of Sleepy Hollow by Washington Irving.

The boulder where she is believed to have been killed was marked by an iron cross which no longer exists. Sometime in the 20th century, Hulda was memorialized in the graveyard of the Old Dutch Church of Sleepy Hollow with a gravestone engraved "Hulda the Witch 0000 – 0000." In 2019, an 18th-century-style gravestone with a winged head replaced the old marker. It is marked: "Hulda of Bohemia died c. 1777. Herbalist, Healer, Patriot. Felled by British while protecting the Militia. Buried here in gratitude for her sacrifice."
