= Wolfarth =

Wolfarth is a surname. Notable people with the surname include:

- Christian Wolfarth (born 1960), Swiss jazz percussion player
- William M. Wolfarth (1906–1993), American politician

== See also ==
- Wohlfahrt
