= Sunnyside (Tarrytown, New York) =

Historic house built in 1835, home of Washington Irving, in New York, United States

- U.S. National Register of Historic Places
- U.S. National Historic Landmark
- New York State Register of Historic Places
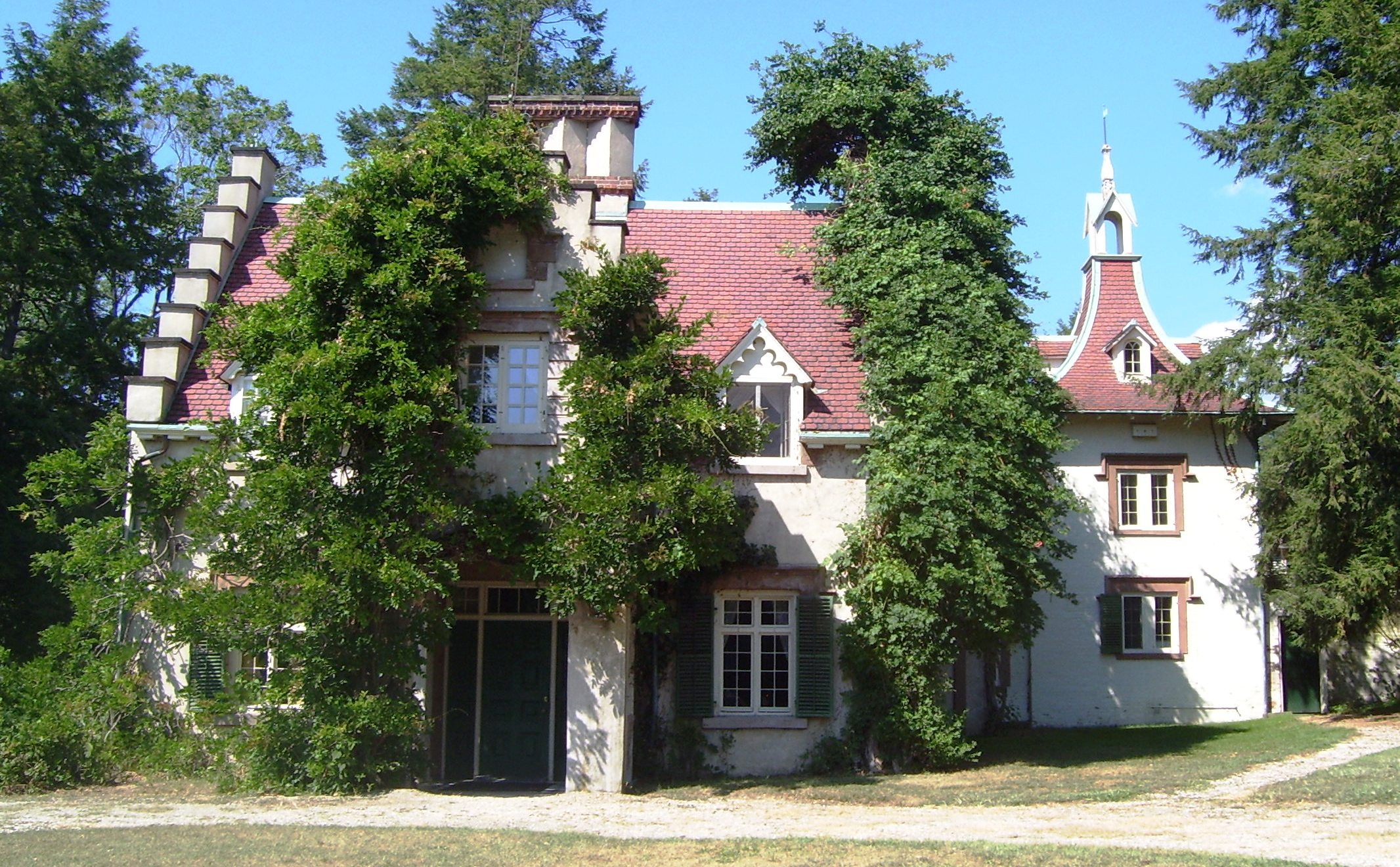
- View from the south (2012)

- Location within New York Location within the United States
- Location: West Sunnyside Lane; Tarrytown, New York
- Nearest city: White Plains
- Coordinates: 41°02′51.2″N 73°52′11.6″W
- Area: 10 acres (4.0 ha)
- Built: 1835
- Architect: George Harvey
- Architectural style: Dutch Colonial Revival, Scottish Gothic, Tudor Revival, Romantic
- NRHP reference No.: 66000583
- NYSRHP No.: 11950.000325

Significant dates
- Added to NRHP: October 15, 1966
- Designated NHL: December 29, 1962
- Designated NYSRHP: June 23, 1980

Sunnyside is a historic house built in 1835 on 10 acres (4 ha) along the Hudson River, in Tarrytown, New York. It was the home of the American author Washington Irving, best known for his short stories, such as "Rip Van Winkle" (1819) and "The Legend of Sleepy Hollow" (1820).

This cottage-like estate, designated a National Historic Landmark in 1962, reflects Dutch Colonial Revival, Scottish Gothic, and Tudor Revival influences, with its wisteria-covered entrance and jagged crow-stepped gable.

== History ==
An artist's depiction of the part of Wolfert Acker's former estate that was sold to Washington Irving, who called it "Wolfert's Roost" before turning it into Sunnyside

In some sense, Sunnyside began almost 200 years before Irving with Wolfert Acker (sometimes spelled Wolfert Eckert), a Dutch-American inhabitant of the region. His property, Wolfert's Roost, was part of the Manor of Philipsburg. Among other buildings, Wolfert's Roost contained a simple two-room stone tenant farmhouse, built about 1650.

The property came into the hands of the Van Tassel family, who were married into the Eckert family and owned it until 1802. That year, 150 acres (61 ha) were deeded to the family of Benson Ferris, one-time clerk of the Old Dutch Church of Sleepy Hollow, whose wife, Maria Acker, was a descendant of Wolfert Acker's. Irving would immortalize the Van Tassel family name in his short story "The Legend of Sleepy Hollow" (1820).

=== Irving ===
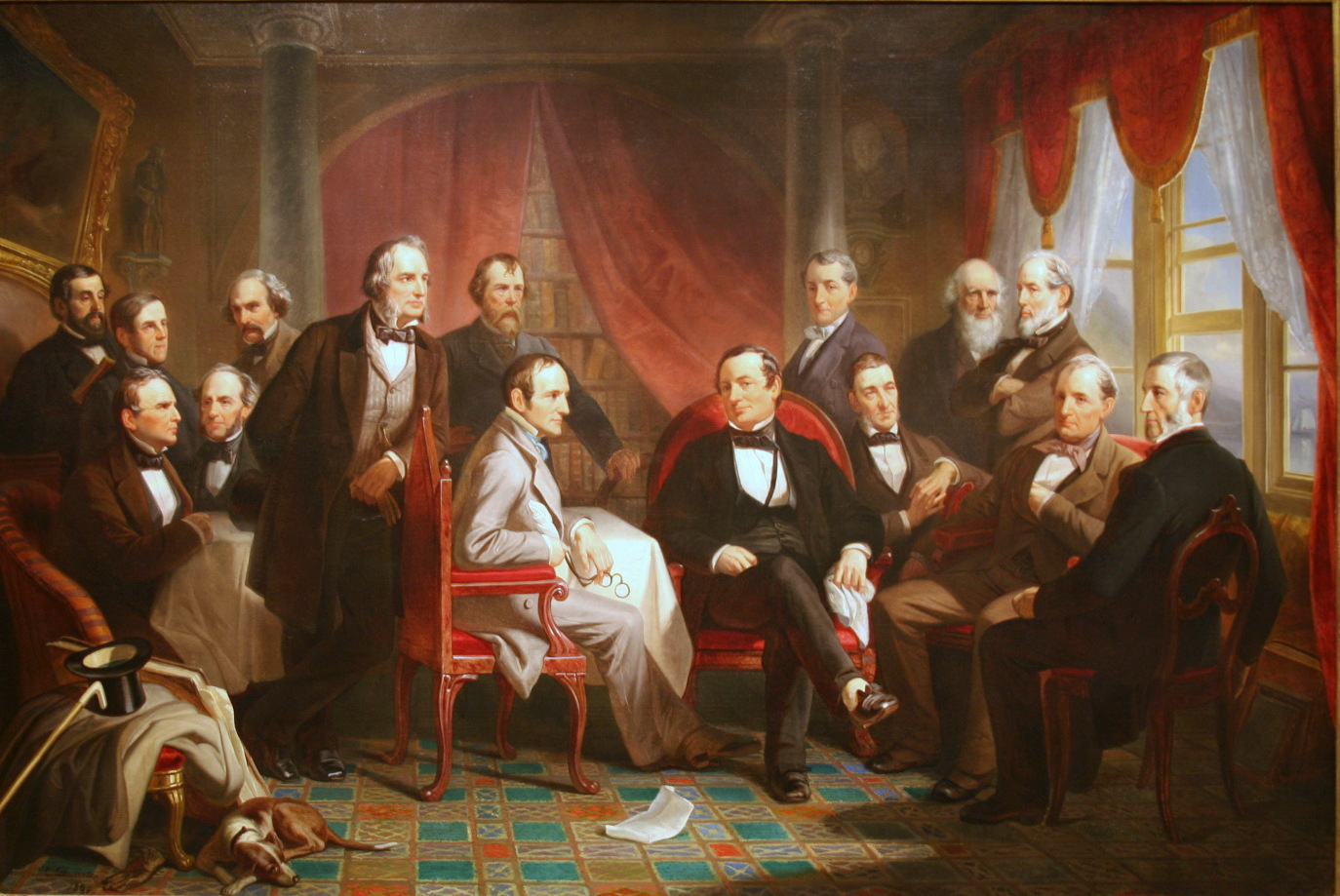
Washington Irving and his Literary Friends at Sunnyside, by Christian Schussele (1864)

In 1832, Washington Irving visited his nephew Oscar Irving who lived near the old stone farmhouse. Irving had recently undertaken a substantial trip through the prairies of the Arkansas and Mississippi Rivers, and the frontier lifestyle made him lament his lack of a home of his own. He was also frustrated because he had lived most of his adult life as a guest in other people's homes. As Irving wrote, he was eager for a home and was "willing to pay a little unreasonably for it". Irving finally purchased the property on June 7, 1835, for $1,800; he would later, through the years, add to the property to expand the estate.

Irving wrote a story, "Wolfert's Roost", about Acker and the site. In a letter to his brother Peter, he described it as "a beautiful spot, capable of being made a little paradise... I have had an architect up there, and shall build upon the old mansion this summer. My idea is to make a little nookery somewhat in the Dutch style, quaint, but unpretending. It will be of stone." Irving requested that his friend and neighbor, English-born painter George Harvey, become his aesthetic collaborator and foreman in the house's subsequent remodeling and enlargement, and the landscaping of the grounds in Romantic style, which included creating a pond Irving called "The Little Mediterranean", fed by Sunnyside Brook, and exited by a waterfall that led to the serpentine stream.

The result is a "cottage" that was widely known even at the time, appearing in Harper's Weekly and in guidebooks to the area. Oliver Wendell Holmes Sr. said that Sunnyside stood "next to Mount Vernon, the best known and most cherished of all the dwellings in our land." The public interest in the home, and in Irving, America's first literary star, drew numerous visitors throughout the year, hoping to catch a glimpse of Irving working. Irving's neighbor Nathaniel Parker Willis joked, "Could not Sunny-side 'pay' to be got ready for a boarding-house?"

In 1842, Irving accepted a nomination as Ambassador to the Court of Isabella II of Spain. He left Sunnyside in the care of his brother Ebenezer, who lived there with his four grown daughters, who supervised the running of the household. Irving wrote of his appointment, "The only drawback upon all this is the hard trial of tearing myself away from dear little Sunnyside." He returned to New York on September 19, 1846. Shortly after his return, in 1847, he added to the cottage the "Spanish Tower", influenced by Spanish monastic architecture and the Alhambra in Granada. It added four bedrooms to the house.

In his late years at Sunnyside, Irving completed what he considered his "crowning effort", a five-volume biography of his namesake, George Washington, which the author completed only weeks before his death. Irving died of a heart attack in his bedroom at Sunnyside on November 28, 1859, at age 76.

=== Name ===
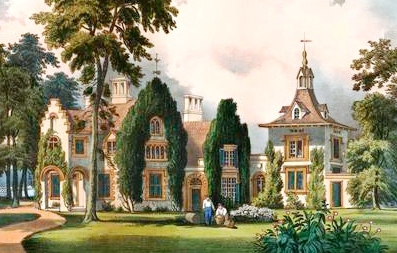
Sunnyside, Currier and Ives, c.1860

According to historical linguist Laura Wright in her book Sunnyside: A Sociolinguistic History of British House Names (2020), Irving came across the name "Sunnyside" on an 1816 visit to Sir Walter Scott's castle Abbotsford. Nearby there was a farm on a hill called "Sunnyside".

== Museum ==
The Irving family continued to inhabit the cottage until 1945, when Louis Irving sold it to John D. Rockefeller Jr., who purchased it as part of his efforts in historic preservation. It was restored – including tearing down a Victorian style northern addition – and was opened to the public in 1947.

Sunnyside is now operated as a museum by Historic Hudson Valley, which charges an admission fee. Tours are led by guides in period costume. The museum contains a large collection of Irving's original furnishings and accessories; in particular, all furniture and most accessories in his writer's study are original. The study, dining room, parlor, kitchen, as well as most bedrooms, are open to the public and contain many of the original furnishings owned by the Irving family, with some period-appropriate furnishings from other sources.

Sunnyside was declared a National Historic Landmark in 1962.

== Other sites ==
There is a partial replica of Sunnyside in the Washington Irving Memorial Park and Arboretum in Bixby, Oklahoma, with a statue of Irving seated on the side porch.

A replica of the house stands at Liberty Square at The Walt Disney World Resort's Magic Kingdom; the building serves as a quick service restaurant.

== Gallery ==
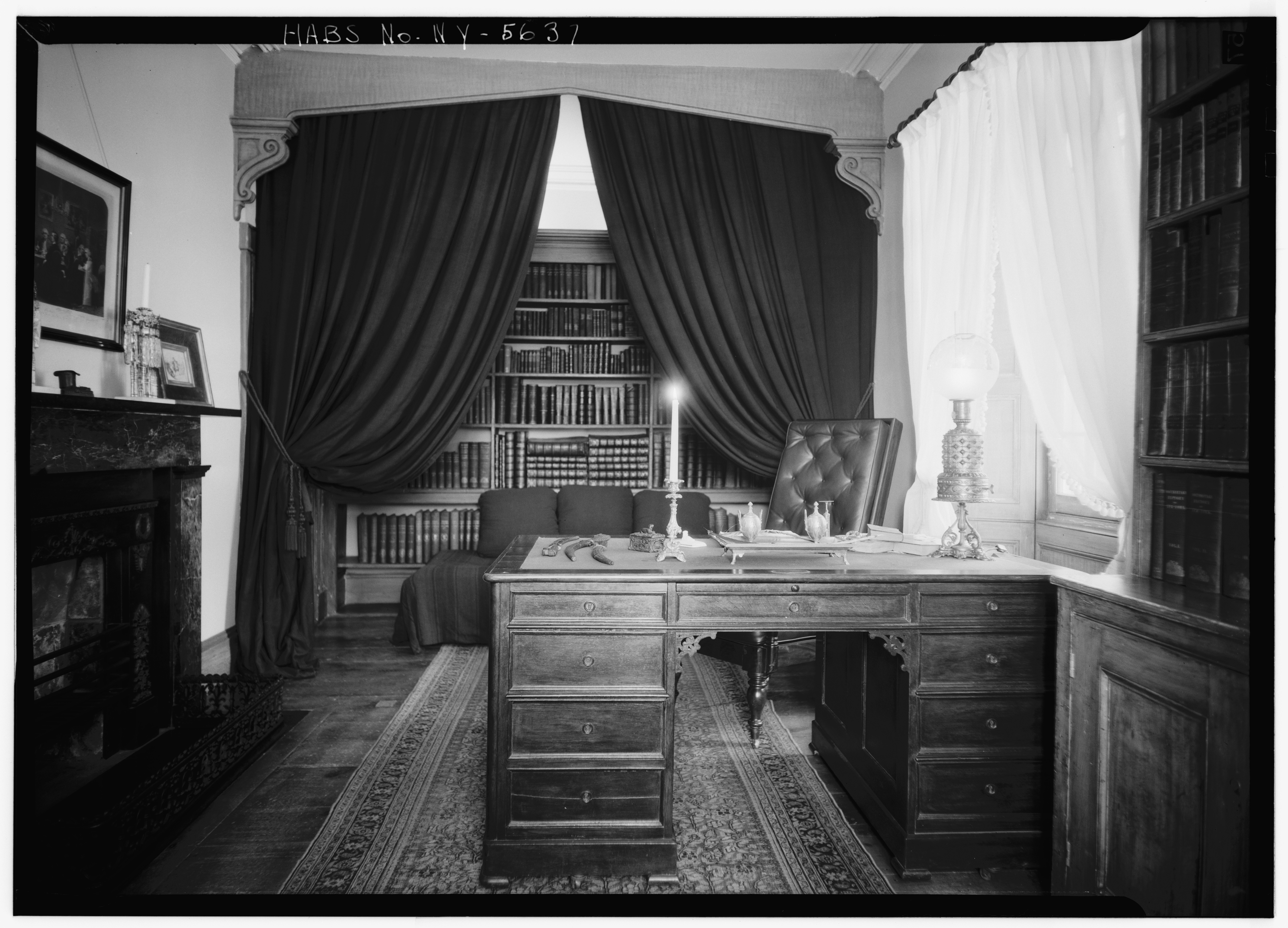
Irving's study

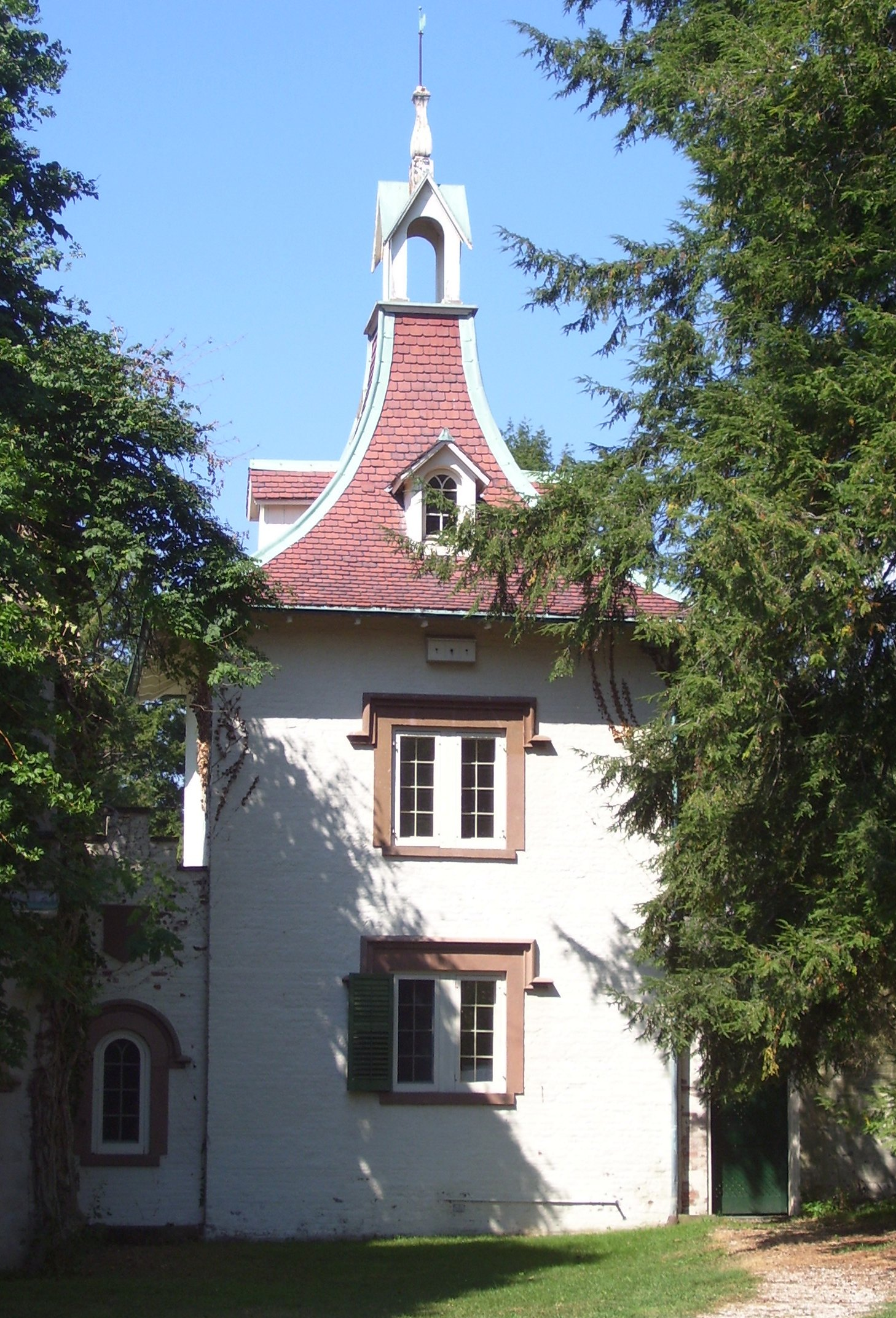
The "Spanish Tower", added in 1847, contains four bedrooms

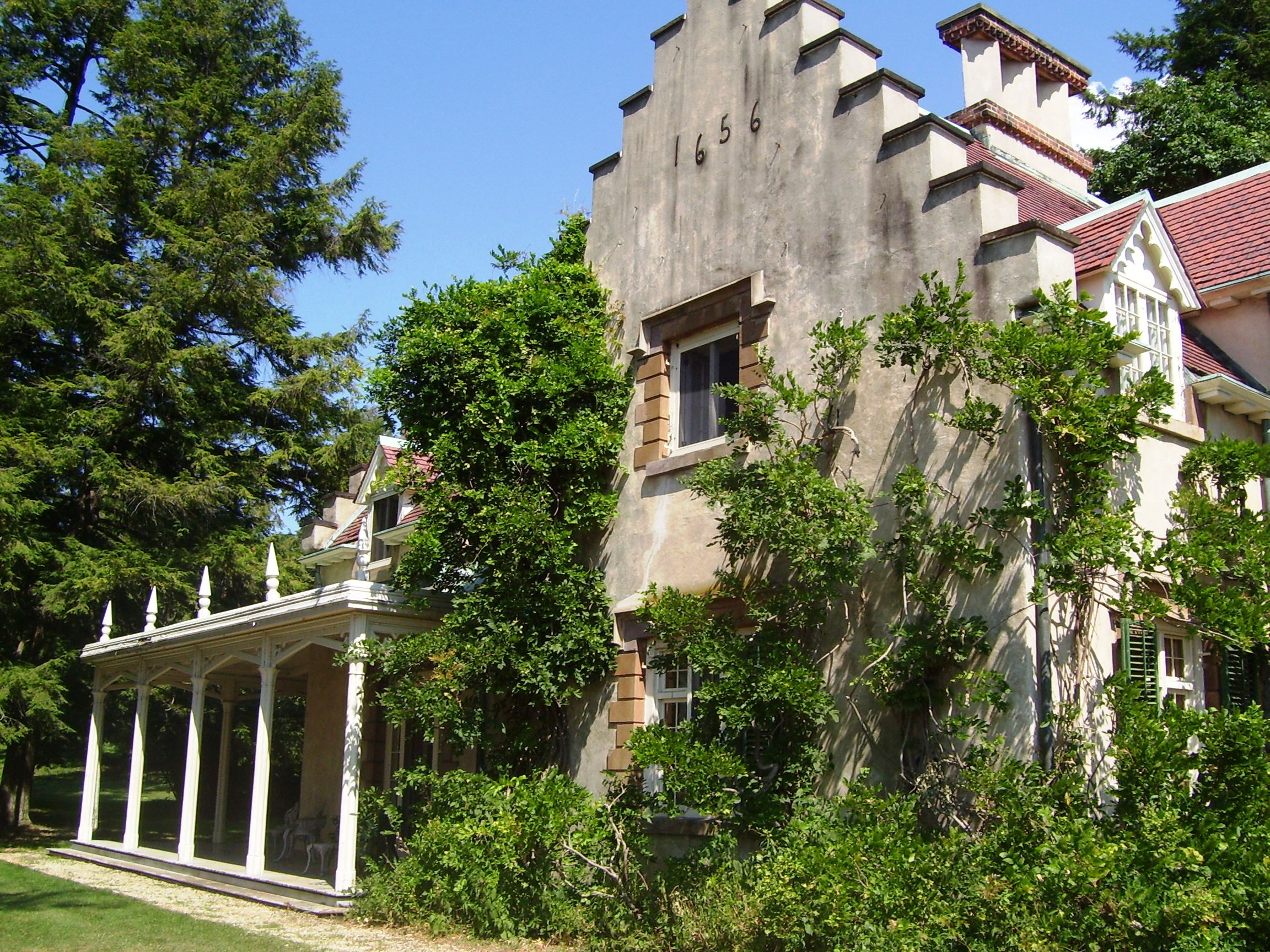
The stepped-gabled west facade of the house, which faces the Hudson River, with the porch – which Irving called his "piazza" – beyond it. It is uncertain why Irving put "1656" at the top of the wall, since the original cottage dates from the 1690s.

== See also ==
- List of National Historic Landmarks in New York
- National Register of Historic Places listings in northern Westchester County, New York
- Sleepy Hollow (disambiguation)
- Washington Irving Memorial
