= Welford (surname) =

Welford is a surname. Notable people with the surname include:

- James Welford (1869–1945), English cricketer and footballer
- Nancy Welford (1904–1991), American actress
- Richard Welford (1836–1919), British journalist, biographer, local historian, businessman and politician
- Rod Welford (1958–2025), Australian politician
- Tiffany Welford (born 1985), Australian tennis player
- Walter Welford (1868–1952), English-born American politician
- Walter Thompson Welford FRS (1916–1990), English physicist
