= Wohlfahrt =

Wohlfahrt or Wohlfart (German pronunciation: [ˈvoːlfaːɐ̯t]) is a surname, and may refer to:

- Franz Wohlfahrt (composer) (1833–1884), German violin teacher
- Franz Wohlfahrt (footballer) (born 1964), Austrian footballer
- Hans-Wilhelm Müller-Wohlfahrt (born 1942), a German sport medicine specialist
- Harald Wohlfahrt (born 1953), German chef
- Jos Wohlfart (1920–2000), Luxembourgish politician
- Käthe Wohlfahrt, a German retailer of Christmas decorations
- Michael Wohlfahrt (1687–1741), American religious leader

== See also ==
- Wolfarth
