= Old Dutch Church of Sleepy Hollow =

Historic church in New York, US

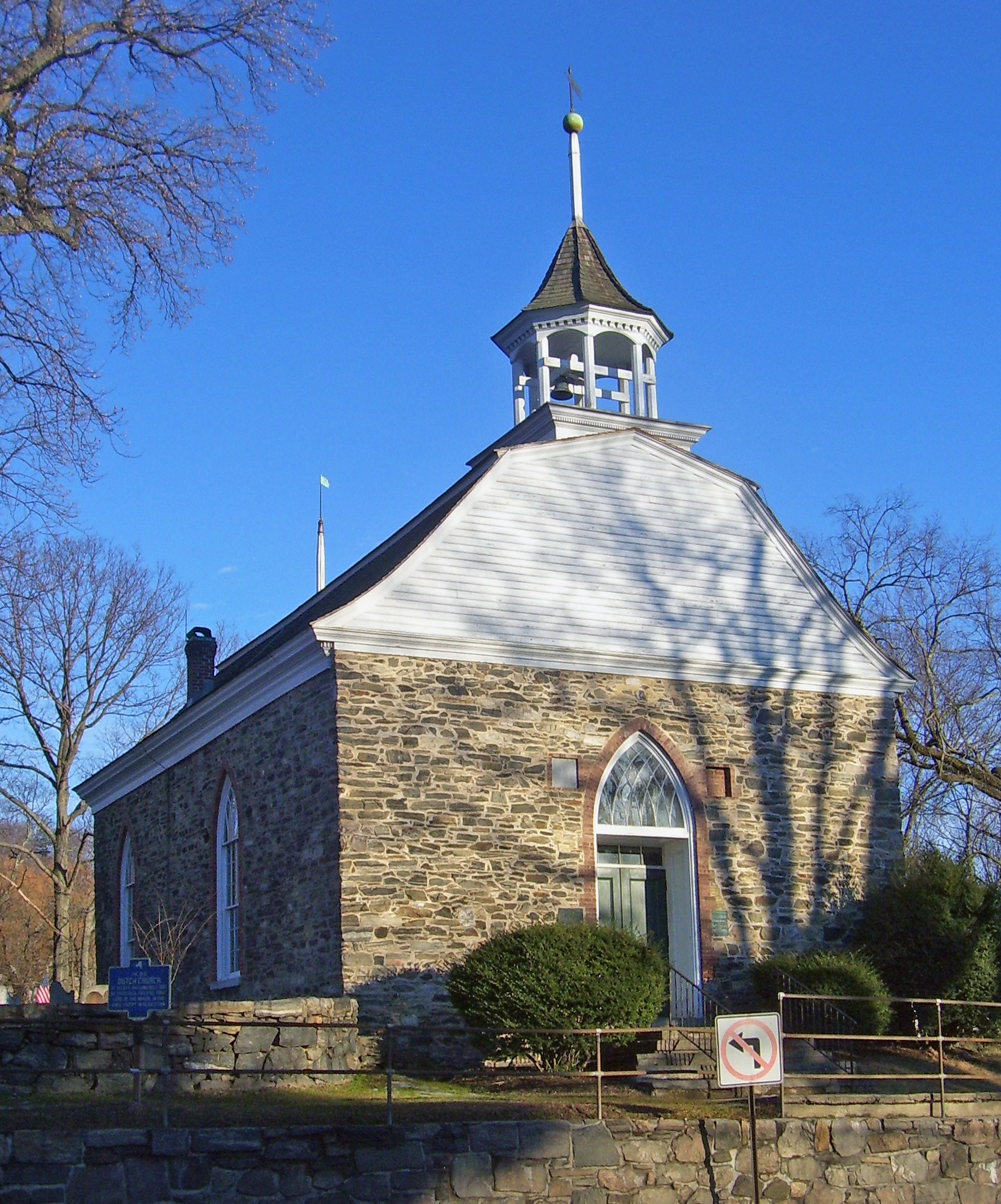
- West elevation and north profile, 2009

Religion
- Affiliation: Reformed Church in America
- Leadership: The Rev. Jeffrey Gargano
- Status: Only used for special occasions

Location
- Location: Sleepy Hollow, New York, US
- Interactive map of Old Dutch Church of Sleepy Hollow
- Coordinates: 41°05′25″N 73°51′42″W

Architecture
- Architect: Frederick Philipse
- Style: Dutch Colonial
- Groundbreaking: 1685
- Completed: ~1697–99

Specifications
- Direction of façade: West
- Materials: Stone, wood, brick

Website
- https://reformedchurchtarrytowns.org/
- Dutch Reformed Church
- U.S. National Register of Historic Places
- U.S. National Historic Landmark
- New York State Register of Historic Places
- NRHP reference No.: 66000581
- NYSRHP No.: 11960.000002

Significant dates
- Added to NRHP: October 15, 1966
- Designated NHL: November 5, 1961
- Designated NYSRHP: June 23, 1980

The Old Dutch Church of Sleepy Hollow (Dutch: Oude Nederlandse Kerk van Sleepy Hollow), listed on the National Register of Historic Places as Dutch Reformed Church (Sleepy Hollow), is a 17th-century stone church located on Albany Post Road (U.S. Route 9) in Sleepy Hollow, New York, United States. The church and its churchyard, the Old Dutch Burying Ground, feature prominently in Washington Irving's 1820 short story The Legend of Sleepy Hollow. The old churchyard is not to be confused, or commingled, with the contiguous but separate Sleepy Hollow Cemetery.

It is the oldest extant church and one of the oldest extant buildings in the state of New York. The church was renovated after a 1837 fire, but some of those renovations were reversed 60 years later to restore the building’s original appearance; further work was done in 1960 to stabilize the building and protect its historical character. It was listed on the Register in 1963, among the earliest properties so recognized. It had already been designated a National Historic Landmark in 1961. It is the property of the Reformed Church of the Tarrytowns, which holds summer services there, as well as on special occasions such as Christmas Eve, Easter, and Reformation Sunday.

== Building ==
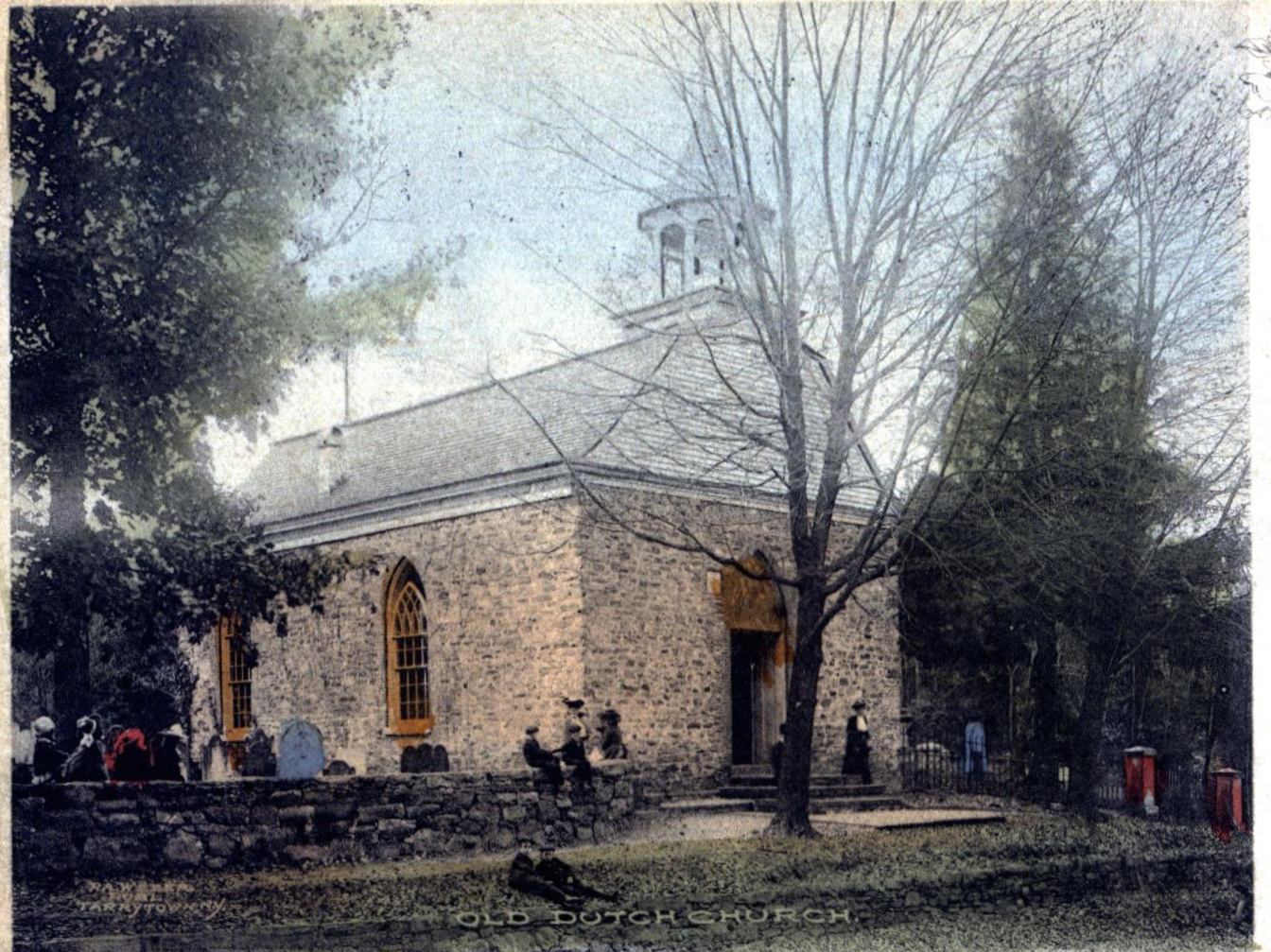
The Old Dutch Church in 1907

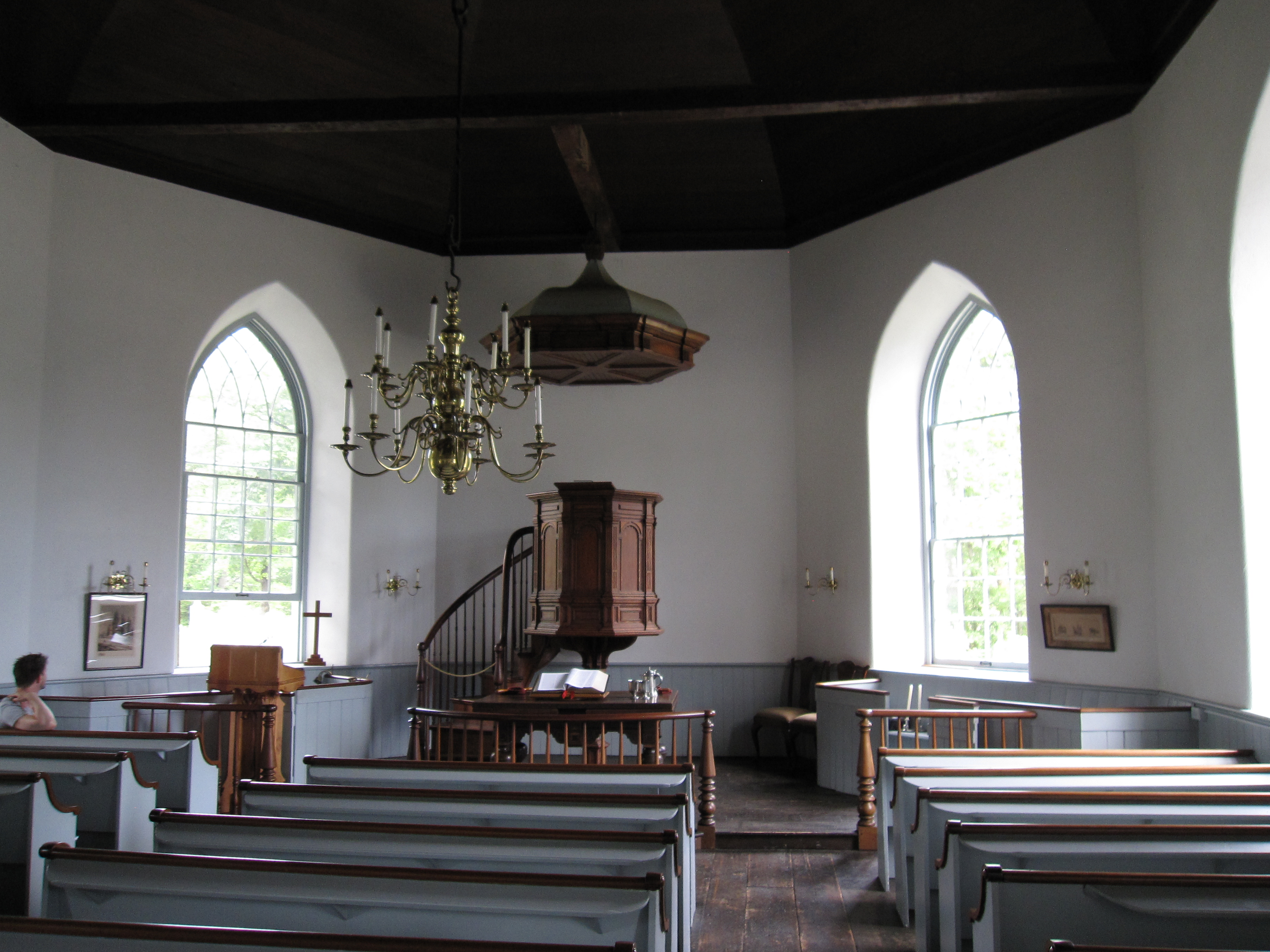
Interior of the Old Dutch Church

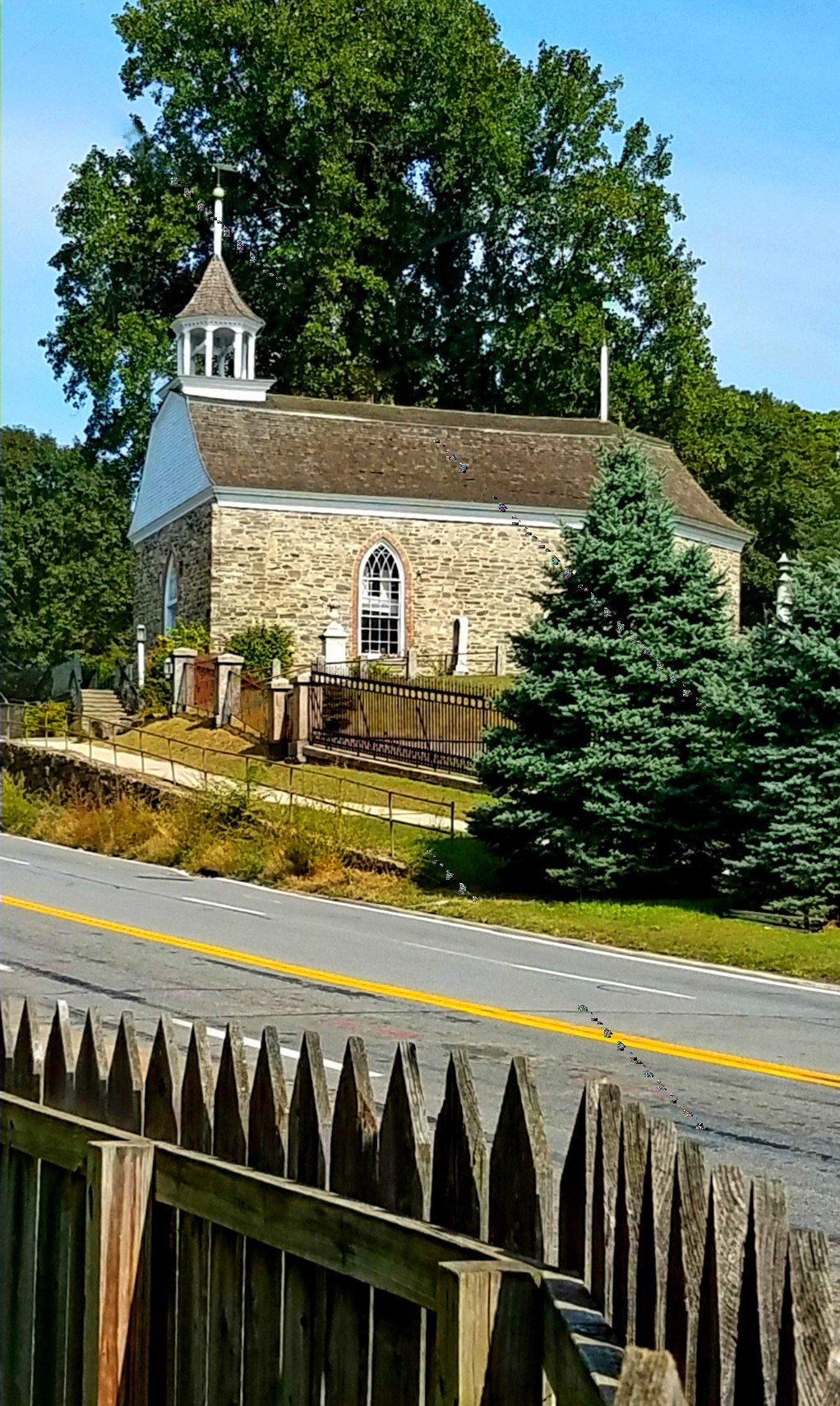
East elevation, 2020

The building was designed and funded by Frederick Philipse I, the first lord of Philipsburg Manor. It is located on the east side of Albany Post Road, opposite the Devries Road intersection, just north of downtown Sleepy Hollow. The neighborhoods to the west are residential. A wooded area to the southeast buffers the church from residential areas in that direction. Approximately 300 ft (100 m) to the south is the mill pond at Philipsburg Manor House, another National Historic Landmark. The churchyard and Sleepy Hollow Cemetery, itself listed on the Register, are to the north.

The church was constructed from fieldstone, local timber, and flat, yellow bricks shipped from the Netherlands. The structure is rectangular, with a three-sided projecting rear apse on the east end. It has two-foot–thick (60 cm) fieldstone walls. They give way to clapboard above the roofline, within the fields of the Flemish-style gambrel roof, with its lower segments flaring outward like a bell. On the west end of the roof is an octagonal wooden open belfry. Within it is the original bell, engraved with a verse from Romans 8:31, "Si Deus Pro Nobis, Quis Contras Nos?" ("If God be for us, who can be against us") and "VF", Philipse's initials. The latter monogram is also on the wrought iron weathervane atop the belfry.

To the west, a stone retaining wall raises the church above grade level. A few shrubs flank the stone steps that lead up to the main entrance, paneled wooden double doors recessed within a Gothic archway. Above it is a glass transom with curved, intersecting muntins. It is set within a brick surround. The north and south side elevations have double-hung sash windows, as do the two side facets of the apse. At the roofline is a molded wooden cornice.

The interior has its wooden pews, with two side aisles, arranged so that all could focus on the pulpit. The pulpit is located on a raised platform in the rear, directly opposite the main entrance. A balustrade with turned wooden posts, open at the aisles, sets the platform off from the rest of the wide-planked floor. Behind it is a table, with a lectern on the north and an enclosed pew along the south side. The ornate wooden pulpit is raised further above the table level; access is provided by a short spiral stair. A pipe organ is located at the rear.

== History ==
Frederick Philipse, first lord of Philipsburg Manor, owned the vast stretch of land spanning from Spuyten Duyvil in the Bronx to the Croton River. After swearing allegiance to and later being granted his manorship from the English Crown, he chose to establish a wharf and an agricultural facility for his extensive shipping and trading operations in the northern part of the manor (later named the Upper Mills), where the Pocantico River flowed into the Hudson River. A small Dutch community had already been established there when he arrived in 1683, with several dozen graves in the small cemetery.

Philipse's wife, Margaret Hardenbroeck de Vries Philipse, died in 1691, and he soon remarried. His second wife, Catharine Van Cortlandt Derval, urged him to build a more permanent stone church for the manor's tenants. Later in the decade, he obliged her. Under Philipse's command, enslaved laborers erected the stone church at the cemetery's southern end. Philipse was its architect, financier, and aid in its construction (a carpenter by trade, he is said to have built the pulpit with his own hands).

A marble tablet in front of the church gives its completion date as 1699. The tablet was placed in the 19th century, however. It is more likely that the church was built between 1685 (the date on its bell, cast to order in the Netherlands) and 1697, when the congregation was organized.

A plaque inside the entrance lists the names of early pastors of the church, starting with Reverend Guilliam Bertholf (1656–c. 1724), a well-known Dutch Reformed minister, who traveled from his home in New Jersey three or four times a year to perform official rites and sermons; services were led by lay leaders the rest of the year.

The early history of the church and its members was recorded by Dirck Storm in his book Het Notite Boeck der Christelyckes Kercke op de Manner of Philips Burgh. It continued to serve as the church of Philipsburg Manor through the American Revolution, when New York's revolutionary government confiscated the lands of the Philipse family, who were staunch Loyalists.

On July 2, 1781, George Washington and the Continental Army made a stop at the church (which Washington mentioned in his diary as "the Church by Tarry Town") before an attempted surprise attack on British outposts at Kingsbridge. The troops rested near the church "till dusk," before continuing their march overnight. (The attempt at surprise failed, as the American troops were spotted by the British.)

After Frederick Philipse III was officially stripped of his lordship title in 1779, the special pews for the lord of the manor were removed from the church, and the plain oak benches built for the Philipses' tenants were replaced with pine pews. Thereafter, the church continued without the manorial patronage. "The people were poor in those days and... some carried their shoes in their hands until they arrived at the Pocantico [River], when they would wash their feet, put on their shoes and enter the church."

Washington Irving, whose Sunnyside estate was a few miles to the south, made the church famous when he gave it prominent mention in his 1820 short story The Legend of Sleepy Hollow as both a setting and a site connected with the Headless Horseman. (The church was already old when Irving first saw it as a teenager.) Irving later gave yellow bricks from the church to outline the construction date on the wall above the door at Bolton Priory in Pelham Manor.

In 1837, a fire (caused by a lightning strike) damaged the church. During the repairs some significant changes were made to the building. The main entrance was moved from the south facade to its current location on the west, the windows and door entry were changed to the Gothic arches, then in style, and given brick surrounds. Inside, the north gallery was removed and the west one enlarged. The original ceiling beams and pulpit were replaced.

The church was renovated again in 1897 for its bicentennial. That work reversed the 1837 renovations, restoring the original ceiling and the original pulpit. The Tarrytown area population had significantly grown through the 19th century, and a branch church had been built in Tarrytown to minister to the expanded congregation. Eventually, that church, the Reformed Church of the Tarrytowns, became the main church, and the original building was used only for special occasions, a practice that continued until the most recent renovation in the 1990s. Currently, worship services in the Old Dutch Church (which has no electricity and can only be heated with a wood stove) are held from June through September. It is also a popular location for weddings.

== Old Dutch Burying Ground ==
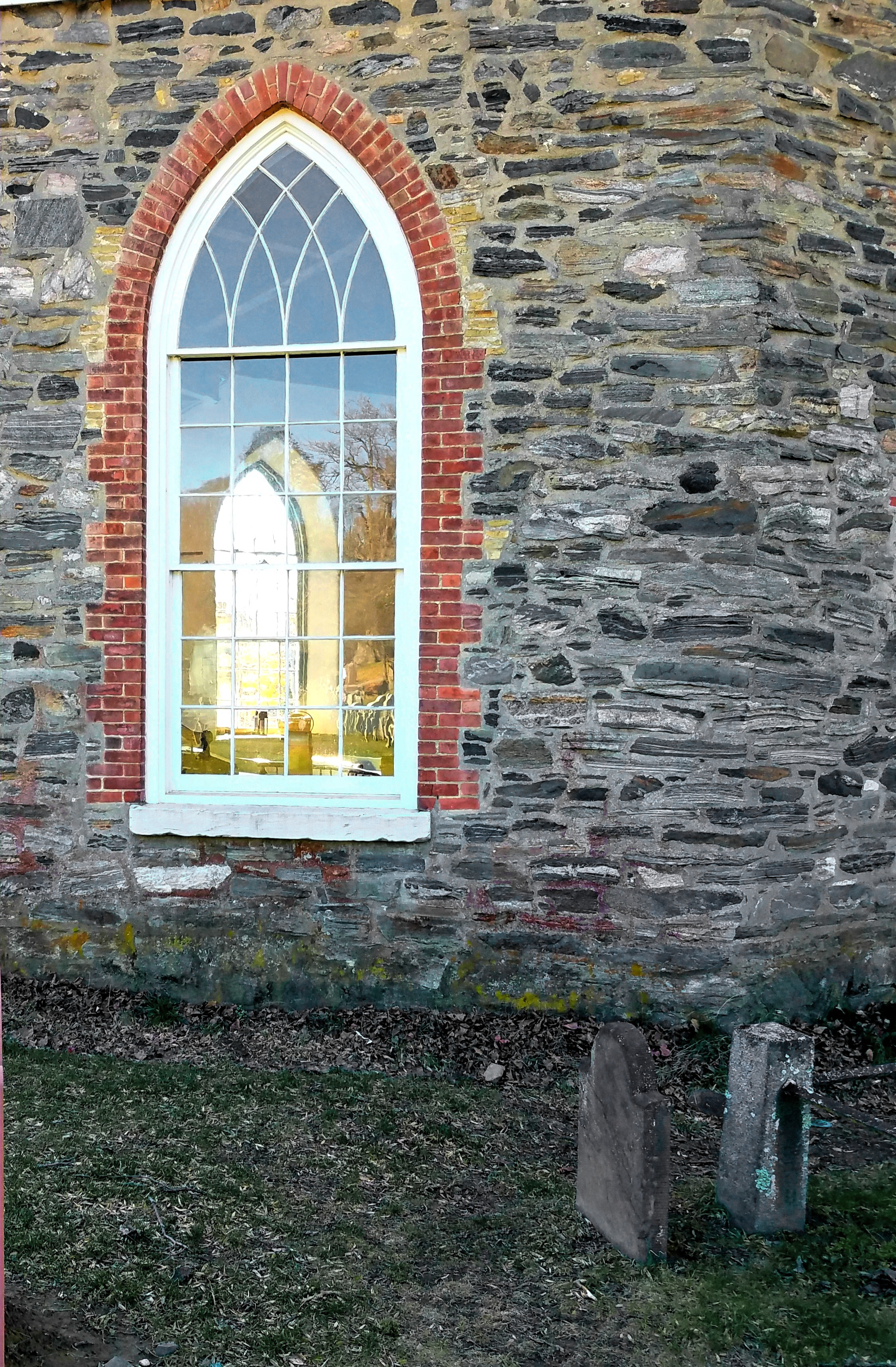
Some of the oldest gravestones are near the northern wall of the church.

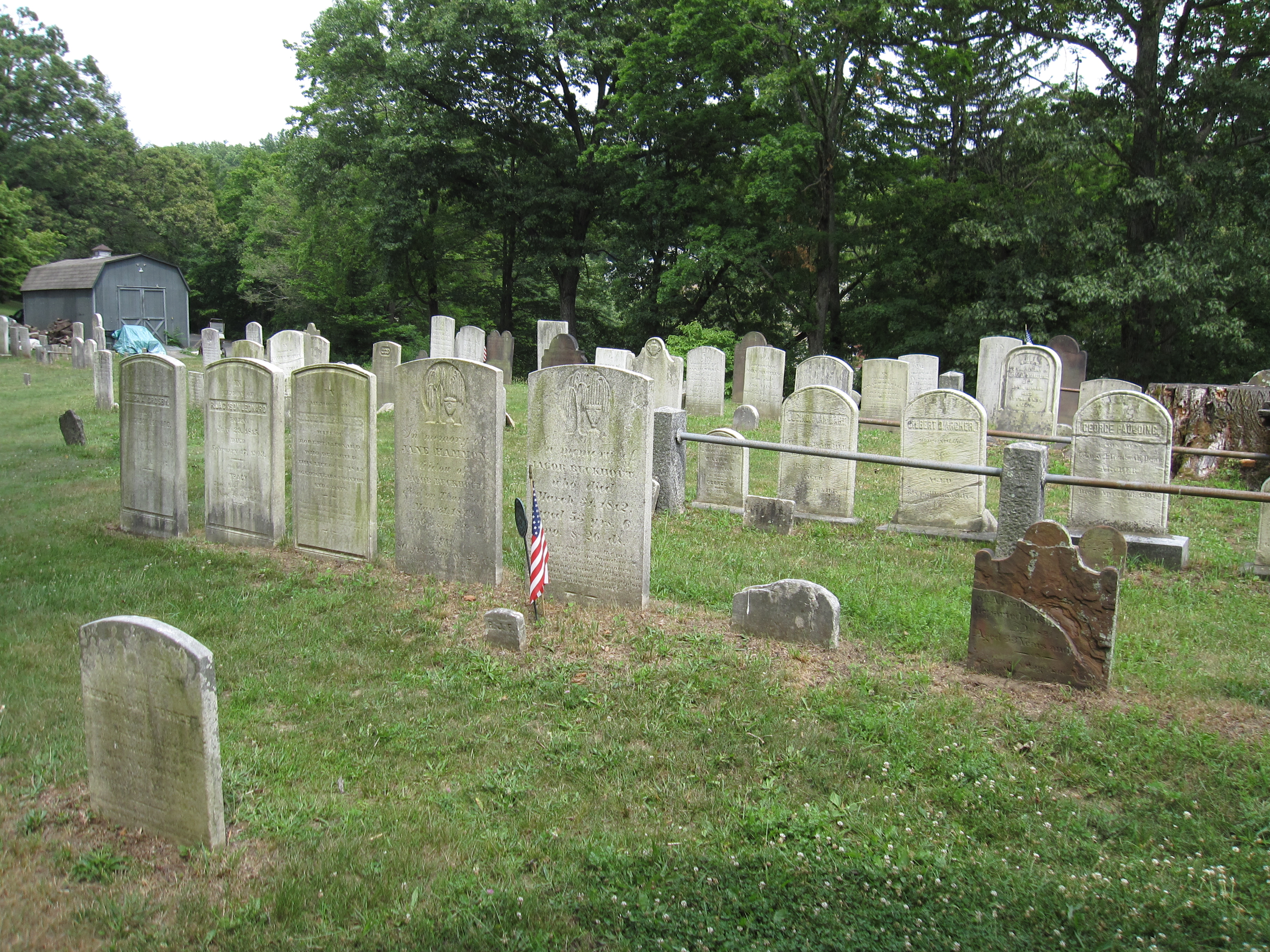
Southeastern part of the Burying Ground

The three-acre (1.2 ha) historical churchyard of the Old Dutch Church is contiguous with, but separate from, the 90-acre Sleepy Hollow Cemetery. It is one of America’s oldest burying grounds. Established by an early Dutch community, it predates the church. The earliest legible gravestone dates to 1755, but initial interments of settlers at this site may have occurred before 1650.

The earliest documented burials are those of the founding members of the church congregation, including the Acker (and variants like Ecker and Echert), De Revier, Van Tassel (Van Texel, Van Tessel), Martling (Martlings, Martelingh), de Younge (Yongs, Youngs), and Storm (Storms) families and their early descendants. Family plots of Swiss, German, French Huguenot, Scottish, and English Puritan and Quaker settler families include, among others, those of the Odell, Pugsley, Romer, and Requa families.

While Dirck Storm's 1715-1716 book, Het Notite Boeck, contains records of church members, deacons and elders, marriages, and baptisms, it does not contain any birth or death dates or burial records (Storm was specifically tasked with recording facts related to the members' spiritual life in the church, not their physical lives). However, over 1,700 names and burial places are documented in family Bibles, the 1926 biographical index, The Old Dutch Burying Ground of Sleepy Hollow, based on a survey of surviving pre-1800 gravestones, and William Graves Perry’s additional survey, The old Dutch burying ground of Sleepy Hollow in North Tarrytown, New York (1953).

None of the abovementioned records contain names or grave locations for either the enslaved individuals of Philipsburg Manor or house slaves of local slaveholding families, or any mention of native American burial places. Some historical sources, however, mention the preexistence of an old Wecquaesgeek burying ground on the hill where the Old Dutch Church was later built and of a separate "burial ground west of the church for the Philipsburg slaves." John Know Allen, in his book The old Dutch church of Sleepy Hollow, Tarrytown, N.Y., writes: "To the west of the church, where the road now runs, were at one time sheds for the horses, and west of these again, in ground now belonging to Philipse Manor, were the graves of the slaves." (The Rev. John Knox Allen served as the pastor of the First Reformed Church of Tarrytown for 50 years and was a noted historian of the Sleepy Hollow area.) No traces of these burial places have survived: because enslaved people were not permitted headstones, their graves were often marked with simple fieldstones or wooden markers that would have long since decayed.

The Old Dutch Burying Ground holds one of the highest concentrations of Revolutionary War veteran graves in the state of New York. Many of these local residents served in Westchester militia regiments and as crucial scouts, guides, and foragers for the Continental Army in the infamous Neutral Ground of Westchester County, a hotly contested buffer zone between the British and the American forces. Van Tassel, Martling, Odell, Romer, Requa, and other local family names appear repeatedly in numerous military action reports and eyewitness accounts of combat engagements. Their graves are marked with small American flags and bronze medallions, placed by the Daughters of the American Revolution and the Sons of the American Revolution. The Revolutionary Soldiers' Monument in the adjacent Sleepy Hollow Cemetery was built in 1894 specifically to honor those interred in the Burying Ground; invaluable historical information on the families whose names are inscribed on the monument, as well as related Revolutionary War events, was compiled in a commemorative book by local newspaper publisher Marcius D. Raymond.

While the total number of burials documented across historic records stands at over 1,700, a much higher number of interments have been made in these grounds. John Knox Allen notes: " ...it appears that there are data from which it can be shown that 3193 interments were made in these grounds during two hundred and thirty-four years, up to 1885. When we recall the fact that the area devoted to this purpose is rather circumscribed, it is plain that the ground has been used over and over again for burial purposes. Proof of that is sometimes furnished in digging for new graves. On the surface it seems as if the sod had never been disturbed, but the grave-digger will come across some peculiarly black mold, or a fragment of a human skeleton, which shows that the dust of some long forgotten man is being disturbed to make room for another whose dust shall in time mingle as indistinguishably with its kindred dust."

== Notable burials ==
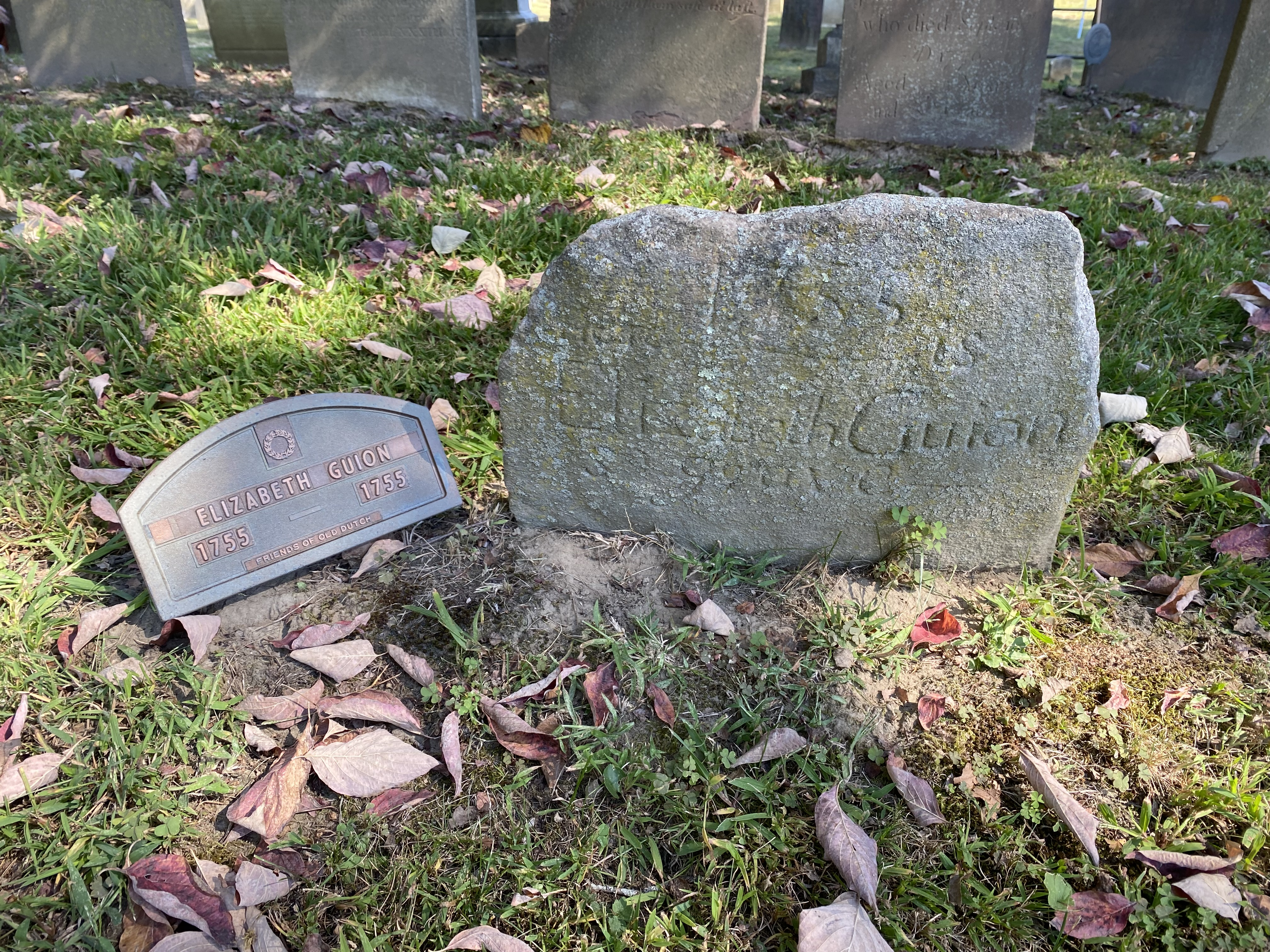
Oldest legible gravestone in the Burying Ground. (Elizabeth Guion was the daughter of a French Huguenot farmer and died in infancy.)

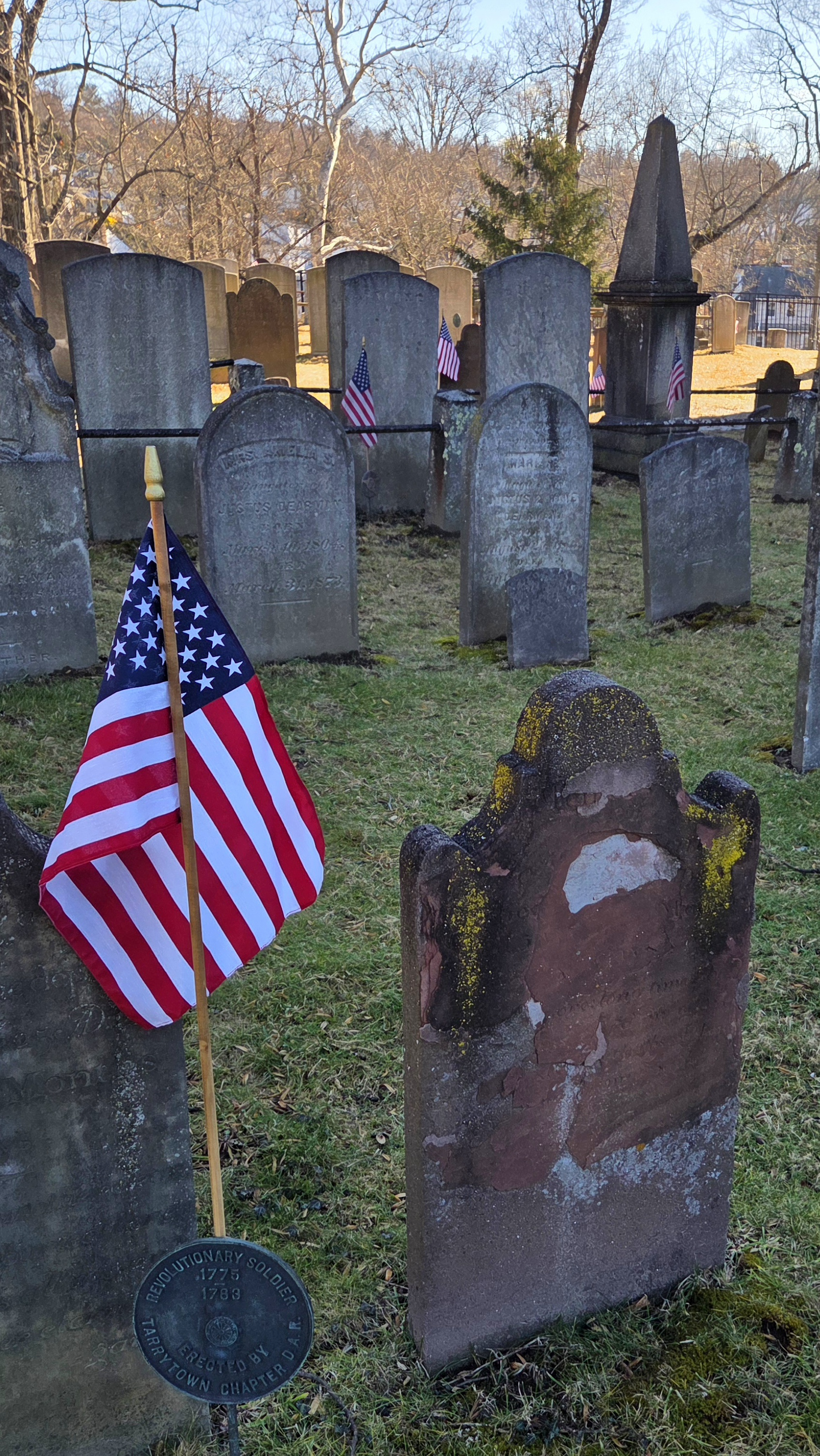
The many headstones of Revolutionary War veterans are marked with flags and bronze medallions

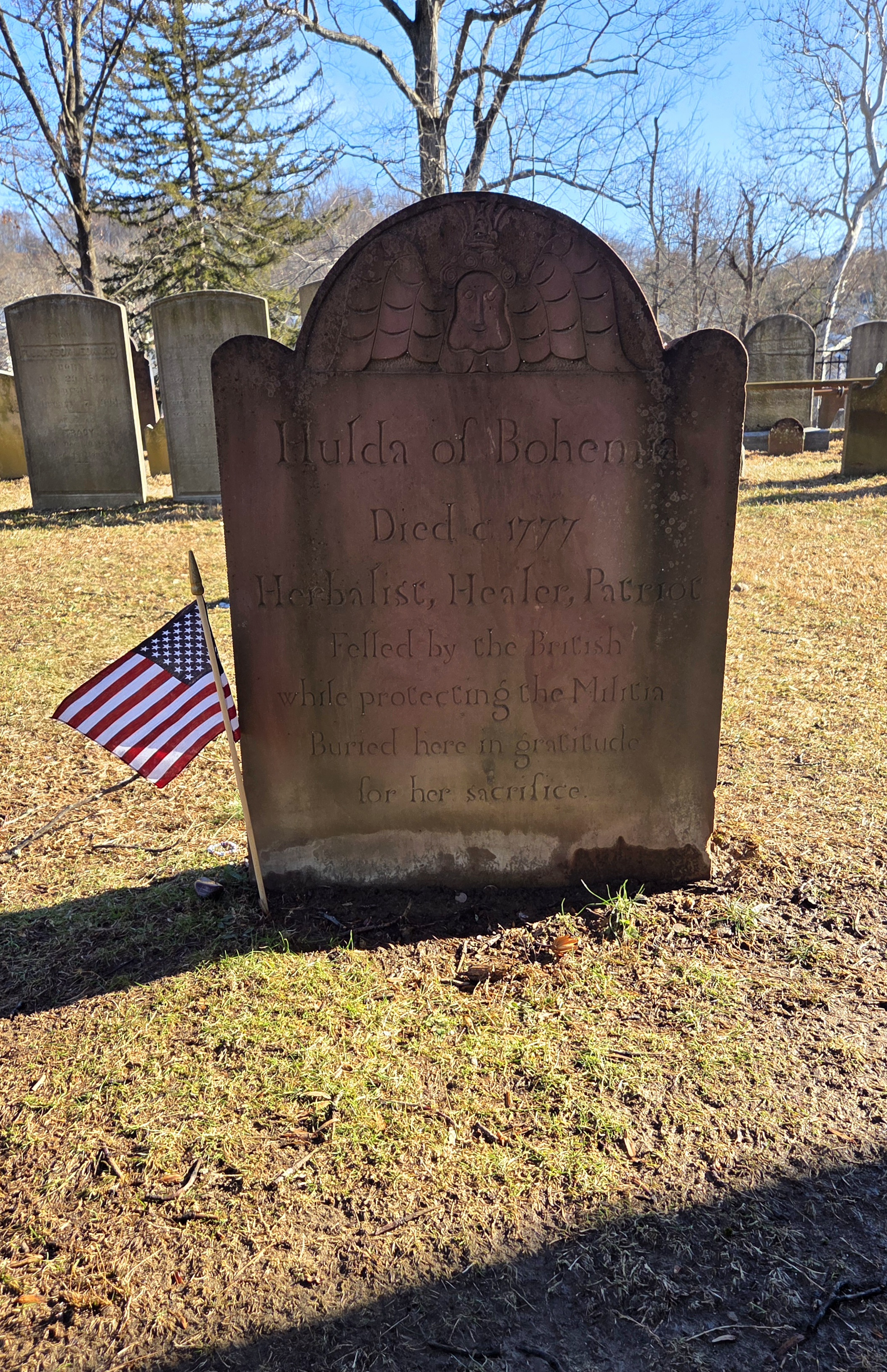
Memorial headstone of Hulda of Bohemia, carved in 2019 in the style of the 18th-century master carver John Zuricher

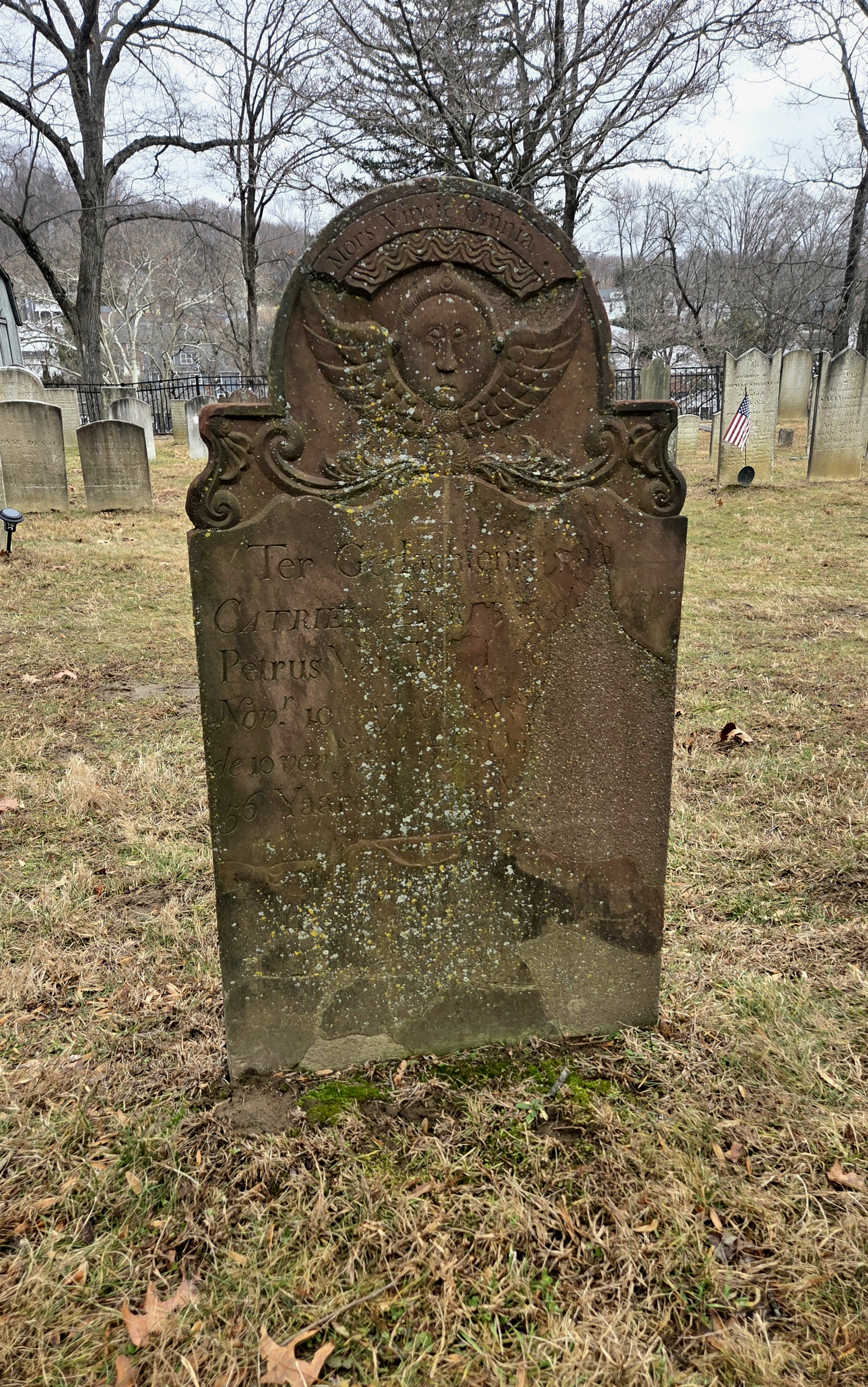
Headstone of Catriena Ecker Van Tassel whose name Washington Irving borrowed for his Katrina Van Tassel

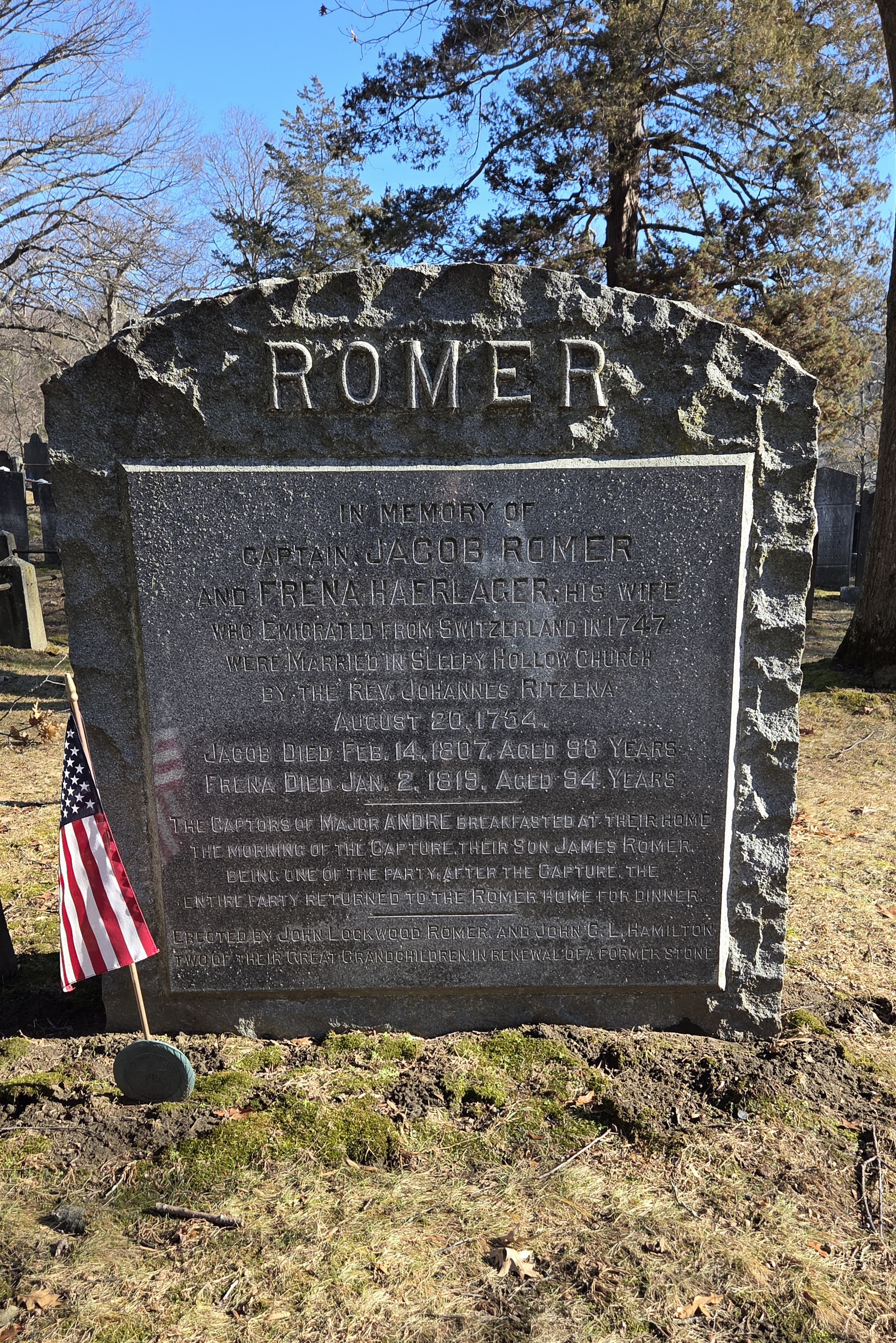
Romer family headstone (historical recreation)

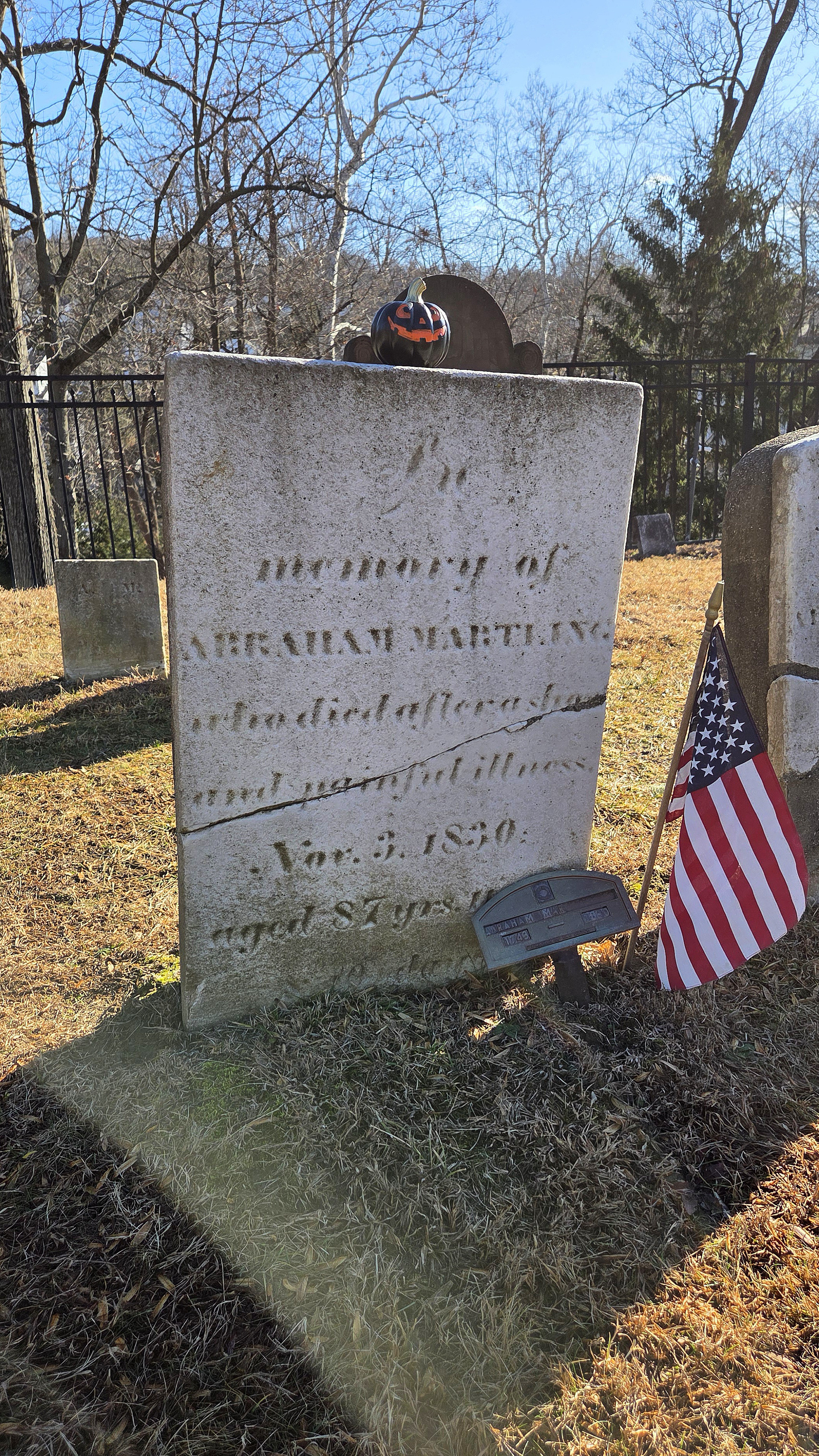
Headstone of Abraham Martling, one of the possible inspirations for Irving's Brom Bones

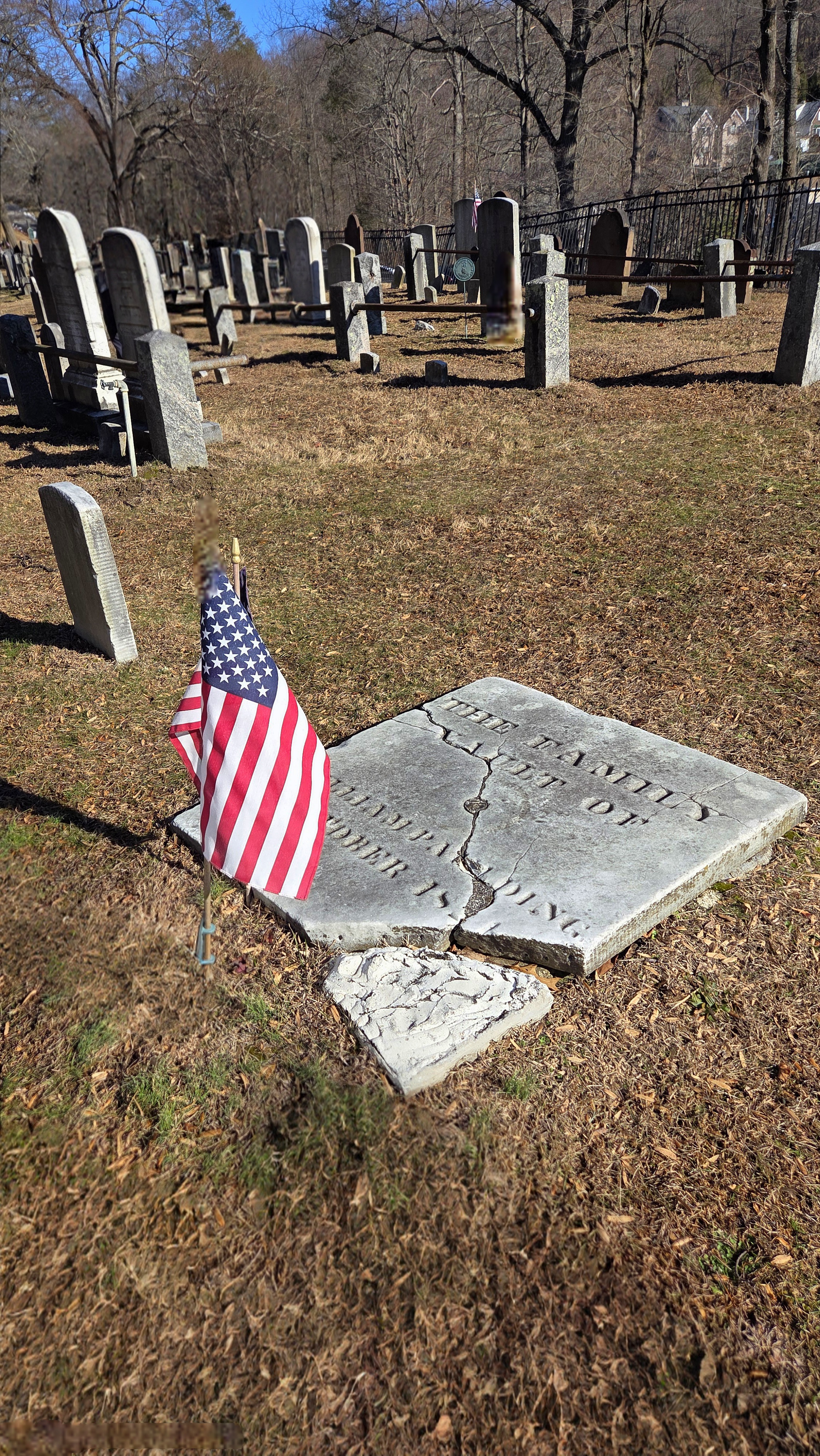
Paulding family burial vault, where two-term New York City mayor William Paulding is interred

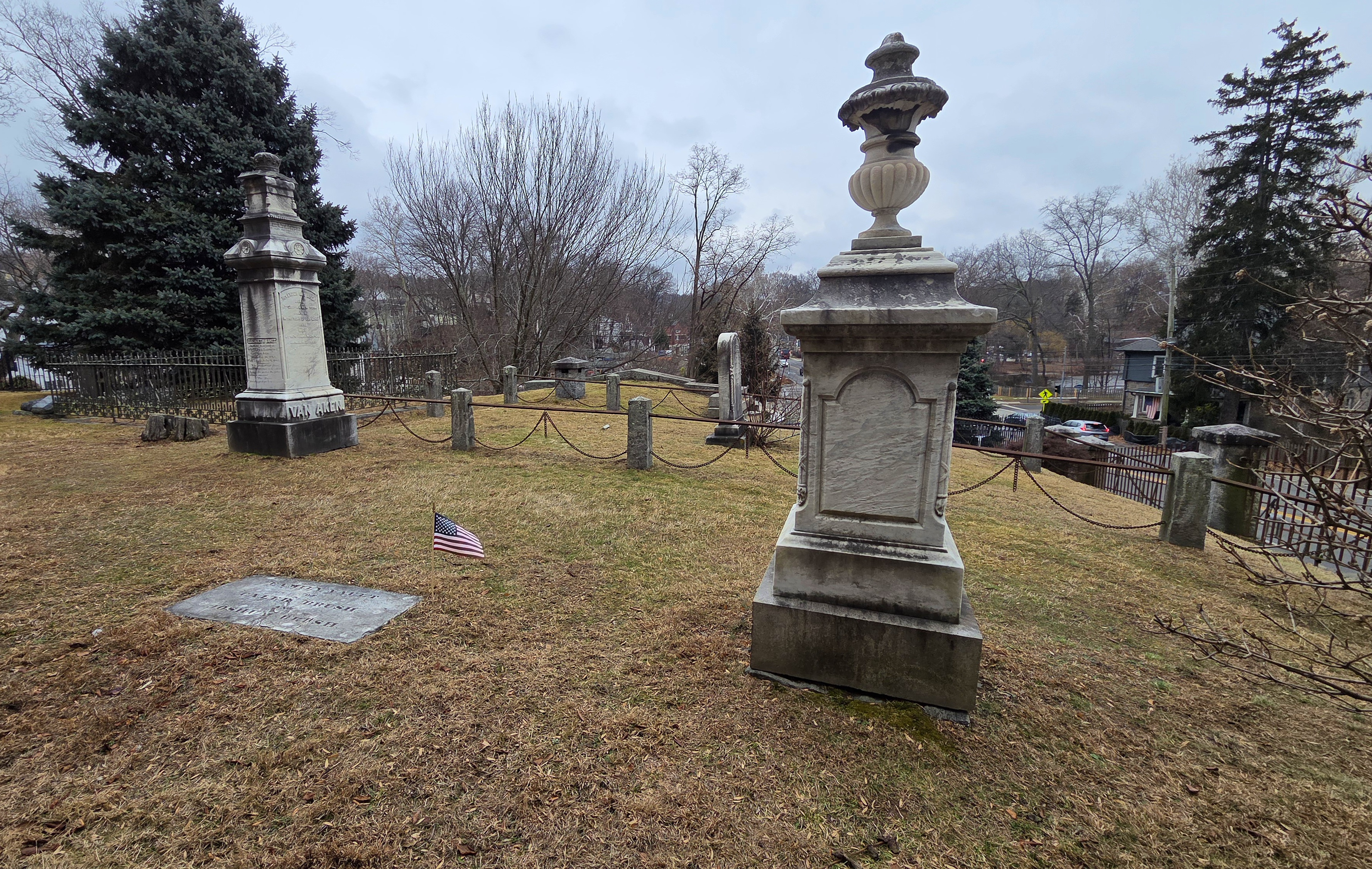
Brush family vault (bottom left, at ground level) where Eleanor Van Tassel Brush, inspiration for Irving's Katrina Van Tassel, is buried. The family cenotaph is on the right.

In the church:

- Frederick Philipse (1626-1702), first lord of Philipsburg Manor and builder of the church, his two wives, and several of his children are buried in a crypt under the floorboards of the church. The exact number of those buried is not known because the crypt has never been formally cataloged or scientifically examined. (It was, however, privately opened and examined by a group headed by the Rev. John Knox Allen around 1897. They found that the coffins had been placed one above the other on two sides of the vault, but the remains had "crumbled into dust" and "only one skull remained to show that human forms had been buried there.")
- Wolfert Acker (1667–1753), former deacon of the church, tax collector of Philipsburg Manor, and subject of Washington Irving's Wolfert's Roost; his wife, Maretje Sibouts; and his brother, Jan Acker, the church's first deacon, are also believed to be buried beneath the church floorboards. Several members of the Acker family served with distinction in the Revolutionary War and are interred in the Burying Ground.

In the Burying Ground:

- Dirck Storm (1630–1715) – author of Het Notite Boeck der Christelyckes Kercke op de Manner of Philips Burgh, a book about the early years of the Old Dutch Church. He also served as Town Clerk in the early years of many New Amsterdam communities, as well as tax collector for Frederick Philipse. His son, David Storm, deacon and elder of the church, is also buried in the Storm family plot. This family plot is the only one on the grounds that is enclosed by a fence and has the family name displayed on the cast-iron gate, which signifies the family's prominent role in the community and its members' landowning status as yeomen.
- Hulda of Bohemia (c.1700–c.1777) – the semi-legendary "witch" and Revolutionary War hero of Sleepy Hollow, killed by British soldiers while protecting the local Militia. An immigrant of German descent, she lived alone in a small hut near the secluded Spook Rock and had extensive knowledge of medicinal herbs, which she reportedly learned from local Native Americans. All this led to her being suspected of witchcraft. As a suspected witch, she was buried in an unmarked grave. After her long-forgotten story was published in a 2011 book, that place in the Burying Ground was marked with a small orange flag. A permanent headstone was finally erected in her honor in 2019, commemorating her as an herbalist, healer, and Patriot. The unveiling ceremony was presided over by the pastor of the Old Dutch Church. Hulda is believed to be the inspiration for the “High German witch doctor,” who bewitched the land in The Legend of Sleepy Hollow.
- Catriena Ecker Van Tassel (1736–1793) – Irving borrowed her name for his Katrina character in The Legend of Sleepy Hollow; she was an aunt of Eleanor Van Tassel Brush, his possible model for Katrina. Washington Irving was certainly familiar with the Catriena family’s popular local tavern; his sister boarded there.
- Jacob Romer (c. 1714–1807) and Frena Haerlager (c. 1725–1819) – the inscription on their headstone (erected by their great-grandchildren "in renewal of a former stone") reads, in part: THE CAPTORS OF MAJOR ANDRE BREAKFASTED AT THEIR HOME THE MORNING OF THE CAPTURE, THEIR SON JAMES ROMER, BEING ONE OF THE PARTY. AFTER THE CAPTURE, THE ENTIRE PARTY RETURNED TO THE ROMER HOME FOR DINNER. Jacob, a tailor, and his future wife fled to America from a small village in Switzerland because her parents disapproved of the match. As indentured servants, they worked for different masters but were later reunited. Married for more than 52 years, both would live into their 90s. The events related to the capture of John André, mentioned on the headstone, took place on September 23, 1780. The historic Romer-Van Tassel House in Elmsford stands on the site of their home.
- Sgt. John Dean (1755–1817) – Revolutionary War hero. A farmer, he enlisted in the Continental Army as soon as it was formed in July 1775. Later, as a Westchester County Militia officer, he played an important role in Major John André's capture on September 23, 1780. While many historical sources credit only three local militia members—John Paulding, Isaac Van Wart, and David Williams—with detaining the spy, it was Sgt. Dean, commanding officer of the eight-man patrol of which they were members that day, who assigned them to their position on the Albany Post Road with the task of intercepting suspicious travelers. When the trio stopped André and found suspicious papers on him, they brought him to the rest of the party. The group decided to take André to the Continental Army's frontline headquarters for further investigation, and Sgt. Dean "took the lead in these matters." Had André been let go, the consequences for the American side in the War would have been disastrous. (The flintlock gun carried by Sgt. Dean is now in the collection of the Metropolitan Museum of Art.)
- Abraham Martling (1742–1830) – one of the possible historical inspirations for the character Brom Bones in The Legend of Sleepy Hollow. There are several Martlings named Abraham (including father and son, one of whom was a blacksmith) in the Martling family plot, which is located just several feet away from the grave of Catriena Ecker Van Tassel. Most probably, Irving's Abraham van Brunt is composed of a few real Martlings.
- Col. John Odell (1756–1835) - George Washington's local guide and scout during the 1781 Philipsburg Encampment; his house is now a public museum, Odell House Rochambeau Headquarters.
- Jacob Van Tassel (1744–1840) – Revolutionary War hero, who spent years as a prisoner of the British; possible real-life inspiration for The Legend of Sleepy Hollow character Baltus Van Tassel, the wealthy farmer and father of the character Katrina Van Tassel. In real life, he was the father of Eleanor Van Tassel Brush, who may have inspired Katrina.
- William Paulding Jr. (1770–1854) – U.S. Representative from New York and two-term mayor of New York City (1825-1826 and 1827-1829); veteran of the War of 1812. Washington Irving was an intimate friend of the Paulding family; his brother, William Irving, married Julia Paulding, William's sister.
- Eleanor Van Tassel Brush (c.1764–1861) – daughter of Jacob Van Tassel; a possible model for Katrina in The Legend of Sleepy Hollow. In the Revolutionary War, during a British raid on her father's home, Wolfert’s Roost (the model for the Van Tassel manor in Irving's story), the British soldiers attempted to kidnap the teenage Eleanor, then known as "Laney." She and the other women of the Van Tassel household—including her mother, aunt, and a slave servant—successfully fought the attackers off. She died at the age of 97, one of the last surviving contemporaries of the Revolutionary War.
- Adam Badeau (1831–1895) – Ulysses S. Grant's military secretary, diplomat, author of the seminal three-volume Military History of Ulysses S. Grant (1881)

Washington Irving's own final resting place is also just over 150 feet away from the graves of those who inspired his characters, in the oldest part of Sleepy Hollow Cemetery abutting the Burial Ground.

Irving's Headless Horseman of The Legend of Sleepy Hollow may have been inspired by the rumored discovery of a headless corpse in the area after the Revolutionary War Battle of White Plains, later allegedly buried by the Van Tassel family in an unmarked grave in the Burying Ground. (There is, indeed, a record of an anonymous Hessian soldier being decapitated by a cannonball during the battle, but there is no documented record of his body being found and buried.)

== Funerary art ==
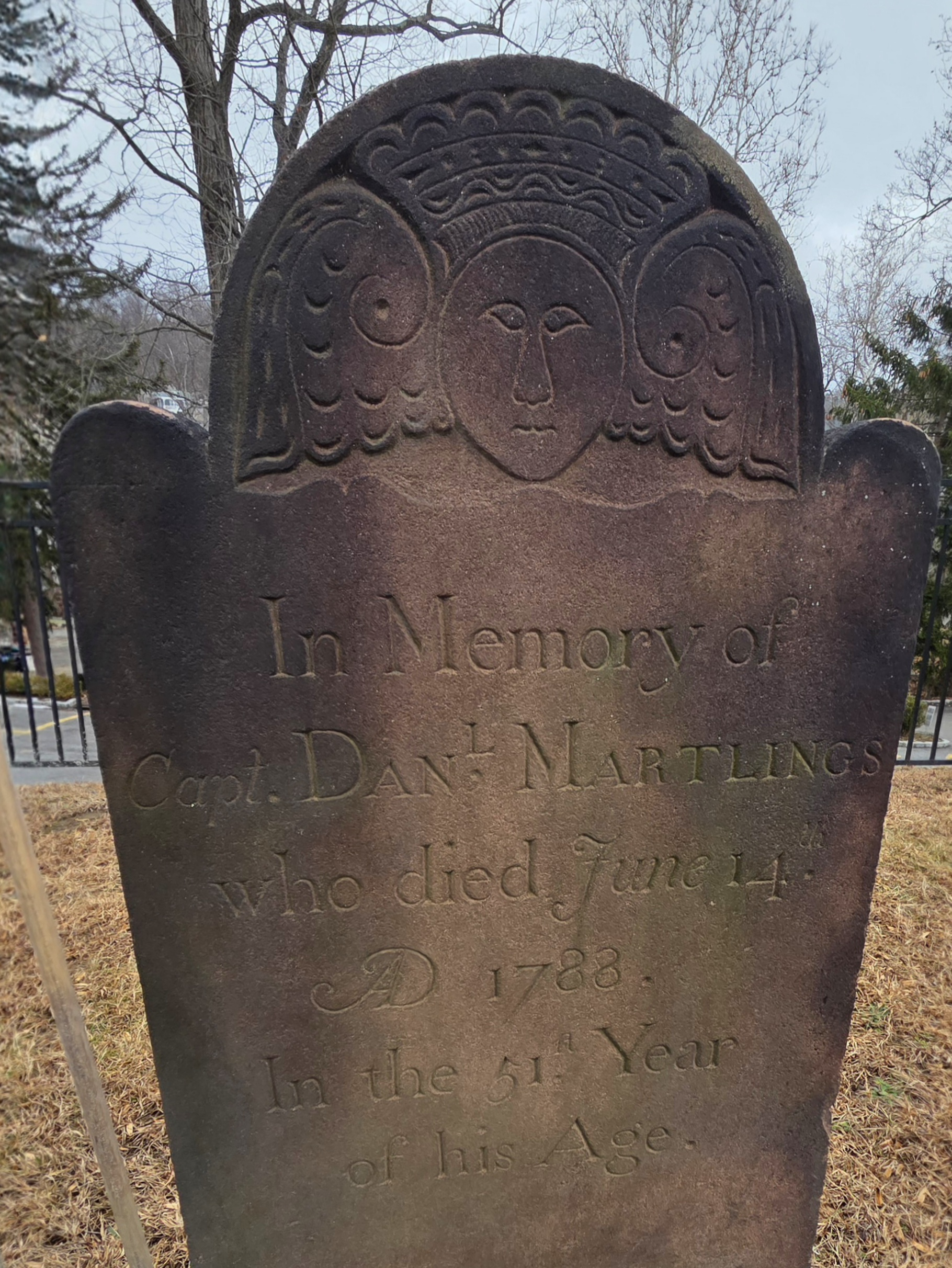
Soul effigy on a tombstone in Old Dutch Burying Ground

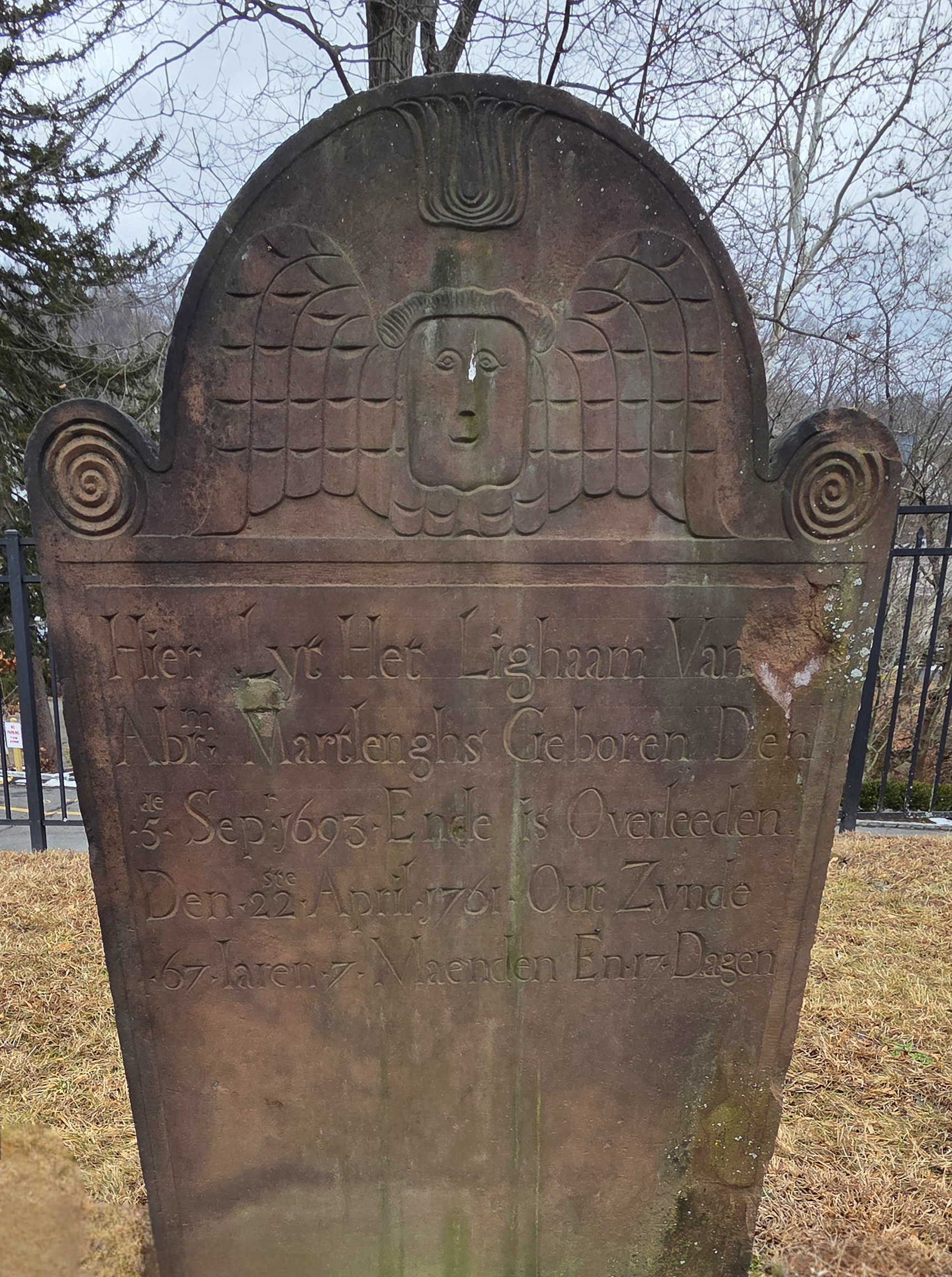
Works of different carvers are identifiable by the distinctive styles of their soul effigies

Carvings on the gravestones of the Old Dutch Burying Ground are among the earliest examples of American funerary art and American folk art in general. Most of these intricate headstones were carved by a small group of 18th-century master stonecutters (or monumental masons), including John Zuricher, based in New York City, and Solomon Brewer, a leading local carver based in Elmsford.

The works of different carvers are identifiable by the distinctive styles of their lettering, elaborate borders, and especially, the images they carved on gravestones—the winged cherub heads called “soul effigies”; they are prevalently found in colonial burying grounds of New England and Central New York. The soul effigy symbolism reflected the Protestants' positive view of the afterlife, with the winged angel, crowned with righteousness, representing the soul's journey to heaven. The stones often had a distinctive three-part top, a symbol for the deceased’s final resting place mimicking the shape of a bed’s headboard.

Zuricher’s signature artistic touch was a soul effigy with round cheeks and, sometimes, a subtle smile. Most of his work in Sleepy Hollow is on red or brown sandstone, which was easily transported up the Hudson River from Manhattan. Solomon Brewer’s faces tend to be more "square" or flat compared to Zuricher’s "plump" faces. Among the many stones by Solomon Brewer in the graveyard (where he is also buried), the most famous is the headstone of Catriena Ecker Van Tassel.

Robert "Bob" Carpenter has been the master carver responsible for preserving the yard since the early 2000s. He has repaired hundreds of historic stones, and it was he who made the headstone for Hulda of Bohemia in 2019. The monument was carved by him in the Zuricher style.

The oldest legible inscriptions on the tombstones are in Dutch, some of the later ones are in both Dutch and English, and the still later ones are in English only. A famous one is the 1768 epitaph for sailor James Barnerd: “The Boisterous Winds and Neputns (sic) Waves have Tost me too and fro. By Gods decree you Plainly See I am Harbourd here Below.” Another one reads: "In Memory of Cap. John Buckhout, who Departed this life April the 10th 1785 aged 103 years and heft behind him when he died 240 chil[dren] and Grand Children." In The Legend of Sleepy Hollow, Washington Irving paints a vivid picture of Ichabod Crane in the churchyard between Sunday services, surrounded by "all the country damsels," "reciting for their amusement all the epitaphs on the tombstones."

Stone rubbing and making impressions are forbidden in the Burying Ground due to the significant risk of damaging fragile stones. In 2021, a visitor applied a chemical solvent to several stones to make headstone castings, severely damaging them. The effects of acid rain have also been destructive to centuries-old stones.

The site is permanently closed for future interments, even though some ground space near the Old Dutch Church remains open.

It stands on a knoll, surrounded by locust-trees and lofty elms, from among which its decent, whitewashed walls shine modestly forth... To look upon this grassgrown yard, where the sunbeams seem to sleep so quietly, one would think that there at least the dead might rest in peace. (The Legend of Sleepy Hollow)

== See also ==
- Historic Hudson Valley
- List of National Historic Landmarks in New York
- List of the oldest buildings in New York
- National Register of Historic Places listings in northern Westchester County, New York
- Oldest churches in the United States
