= Alexander Wellford =

American tennis player

- Born: April 15, 1911
- Died: September 29, 1993 (aged 82)

Grand Slam singles results
- French Open: Loss (1953)
- Wimbledon: Loss (1953)

Alexander Wellford (April 15, 1911 – September 29, 1993) was an American tennis player who played in the 1953 Wimbledon singles championships.

== Career ==
He was, at age 42, perhaps the oldest player in the draw at Wimbledon. He lost at Wimbledon in four sets to Ivor Warwick, who two rounds later, played a competitive match against Ken Rosewall.

That year, he also played in the French Championships, losing a close match to Paul Jalabert, who won a set off Lewis Hoad in the next round. Wellford had won the Tennessee state men's singles title in 1953 before playing in Europe. In the spring at St. Augustine, Florida, he played a good match against Vic Seixas, who won Wimbledon in June 1953. In the first set against Seixas, Wellford took the ball on the rise and passed Seixas at the net a number of times, getting a 5–2 lead before eventually losing the match. This was a time of amateur tennis, and it was not unusual for a player who was not always the best in his own city or state to play a competitive match against one of the world's top players.

== Personal life ==
In 1953, Wellford took on the job of chairman of the board for a group seeking to establish a private boys' school in Memphis, Tennessee. He was chairman of the board for Memphis University School until 1978.

In 1952, he was one of the founding members of the Memphis Tennis Association, serving as its first president.

== Awards and legacy ==
In 1970, Wellford was inducted into the Tennessee Amateur Sports Hall of Fame. In 1984, he was inducted into the Memphis Tennis Foundation Patrons Hall of Fame.

Wellford died at the age of 82 on September 29, 1993. Posthumously, he was inducted posthumously into the Tennessee Tennis Association Hall of Fame in November 1993 and the Southern Tennis Association Hall of Fame in January 1994.
