= Wellford, West Virginia =

Unincorporated community in West Virginia, US

Coordinates: 38°31′50″N 81°20′23″W

Wellford is an unincorporated community in Kanawha County, in the U.S. state of West Virginia.

== History ==
A post office called Wellford was established in 1889, and remained in operation until 1951. The community most likely was named after the local Wellford family.
