= John Woolford =

John Woolford may refer to:

- John Woolford (muse), muse, confidant and the first romantic interest of the composer Benjamin Britten
- John D. Woolford, mayor of Houston, Texas (List of mayors of Houston)
- John L. Woolford Jr., American biologist
- John Elliott Woolford, British draftsman, painter and architect

== See also ==
- John Wolford, American football quarterback
- Johnny Wolford, English rugby league player
