= Wolfert Acker =

Colonial-period American

An artist's 1971 depiction of the property Acker sold Washington Irving, who named it "Wolfert's Roost" before turning it into his estate, Sunnyside

Wolfert Acker (1667–1753) was a colonial-period American who is featured in Washington Irving's short story collection Wolfert's Roost and Miscellanies (1855). His name was recorded in all combinations of Wolfert or Wolvert as given name, and Acker, Echert, Eckar, or Ecker as surname. He was born in Flatbush, Brooklyn, New York and died at his sizable home, "Wolfert's Roost" (or "Wolfert's Rest") near the site of what is now Irvington, New York in Westchester County, New York. On December 20, 1692, on land belonging to Frederick Philipse, first lord of Philipsburg Manor, he married Maretje Sibouts.

Acker served the British colonial government as collector of Philipsburg Manor in New Netherlands. He was a quiet man whose favorite phrase was "Rust in Lust" (peace in quiet) but always found himself working for very loud and active governors; he was, at one point, privy counsellor to Peter Stuyvesant, before eventually retiring to Wolfert's Roost. William A. Owens believes that, despite his high status, Wolfert may have been a tenant of Philipse. Tenant or not, Wolfert did have the second-largest house in the region, second only to Philipse Manor Hall, which still stands. In his will, he categorized himself as ''yeoman."

Jan Ecker, Wolfert's brother, was the first deacon of the Old Dutch Church of Sleepy Hollow, which was founded by Philipse, and was still living in May 1716. Wolfert Acker became the second deacon and later, an elder. However, by May 1716, he and his wife Maritie were two of eight members no longer on the roll, although their names continued to appear as baptismal witnesses until 1734. Acker is entombed beneath the floorboards of the church along with several other Elders, beside Philipse and his family members.

Wolfert's property was passed along in his family for some time before being broken up and sold off. One person who bought his land was Washington Irving who took an existing structure and made his romantic Sunnyside out of it.

The actual Wolfert's Roost, which was a meeting place for local Patriots, was burned down by the British after the brother-in-law of Catriena Ecker Van Tassel shot at the British sloops with a goose-rifle charged with nails. Catriena Van Tassel provided the name "Katrina Van Tassel" in Irving's The Legend of Sleepy Hollow (1820), for the character modeled on her niece, Eleanor Van Tassel Brush. Both women are buried in the Old Dutch Burying Ground, along with many other members of the Acker/Ecker and Van Tassel families.

Eckar Street in Irvington is named for him.
