= 2025 in film =

2025 in film is an overview of events, including award ceremonies, festivals, a list of country- and genre-specific lists of films released, and notable deaths. Shochiku and Gaumont celebrated their 130th anniversaries; 20th Century Studios and Republic Pictures celebrated their 90th anniversaries; Studio Ghibli celebrated its 40th anniversary and Laika celebrated its 20th anniversary. Metro-Goldwyn-Mayer's first musical film The Broadway Melody (1929), known for being the first sound film to win the Academy Award for Best Picture, entered the public domain this year. For the second time in film history, 2025 was the year in which a non-English-language film became the highest-grossing film of the year worldwide, as the Chinese animated sequel Ne Zha 2 earned approximately $2.2 billion globally.

== Highest-grossing films ==
Highest-grossing films of 2025
Rank	Title	Distributor	Worldwide gross
1	Ne Zha 2	Beijing Enlight	$2,215,690,000
2	Zootopia 2	Disney	$1,870,309,291
3	Avatar: Fire and Ash	20th Century	$1,490,386,712
4	Lilo & Stitch	Disney	$1,038,027,526
5	A Minecraft Movie	Warner Bros.	$961,287,780
6	Jurassic World Rebirth	Universal	$872,428,220
7	Demon Slayer: Kimetsu no Yaiba – The Movie: Infinity Castle	Aniplex / Toho / Crunchyroll	$793,594,078
8	How to Train Your Dragon	Universal	$639,866,451
9	F1	Warner Bros. / Apple	$634,142,436
10	Superman	Warner Bros.	$618,723,803

=== Box office records ===
- Ne Zha 2 surpassed The Battle at Lake Changjin to become the highest-grossing non-English language film. It became the 57th film overall, and 14th animated film to pass $1 billion and the seventh film to pass $2 billion. It became the highest-grossing animated film of all time as well as the 5th highest-grossing film overall. It became the second ever non-Hollywood film production to become the highest-grossing film of the year, following Demon Slayer: Kimetsu no Yaiba Mugen Train in 2020 during the COVID-19 pandemic.
  - It surpassed Inside Out 2 (2024) as the highest-grossing animated film, breaking Disney's 14-year streak with the title after regaining it with Toy Story 3 (2010). Doing so, Enlight Pictures became the first non-Hollywood studio to hold this distinction.
  - It became the first non-English language film to gross $1 billion and $2 billion worldwide.
  - It surpassed Star Wars: The Force Awakens to become the highest-grossing film ever in a single market. It also became the first film to earn $1 billion and $2 billion in a single market.
  - On March 2, thirty-three days after release, Ne Zha 2 surpassed $2 billion, the first animated film in history to do so. It is the seventh film overall to achieve this milestone.
  - It set the records of highest-grossing worldwide opening for an animated film and highest-grossing worldwide opening of the year, up until these records were surpassed by Zootopia 2 later the same year.
- Zootopia 2 became the 59th film overall, the 15th animated film, and the second-fastest animated film (at 17 days, behind Ne Zha 2’s 12 days) to gross $1 billion worldwide.
  - It claimed the fourth highest-grossing worldwide opening of all time ($560.3 million), placing behind Avengers: Endgame ($1.2 billion), Avengers: Infinity War ($641 million), and Spider-Man: No Way Home ($601 million).
  - It set the records of highest-grossing worldwide opening for an animated film, and highest-grossing worldwide opening of the year, surpassing Ne Zha 2 in both instances. It is also the highest-grossing worldwide opening of any animated film in Disney history, surpassing Moana 2.
  - On 12 December, seventeen days after release, Zootopia 2 became the fastest MPA animated film, and PG-rated film, to reach $1 billion, surpassing Inside Out 2’s 19 days in both instances.
  - On 31 December, thirty-six days after release, Zootopia 2 surpassed Frozen 2 to become Walt Disney Animation Studios' highest-grossing film.
  - On 18 January, fifty-four days after release, Zootopia 2 surpassed Inside Out 2 to become Disney's highest-grossing animated film of all time, the highest-grossing MPA animated film of all time, and the highest-grossing PG-rated film of all time.
  - The Zootopia film franchise surpassed $2.8 billion with the release of Zootopia 2.
- Avatar: Fire and Ash became the 60th film overall to gross $1 billion worldwide.
  - The Avatar film series surpassed $6 billion with the release of Avatar: Fire and Ash.
  - It became the first film in the franchise to not reach $2 billion at the box office.
- Lilo & Stitch became the 58th film overall, and the first MPA film of 2025 to gross $1 billion worldwide.
  - It became the second best first-day ticket pre-seller for a Disney live-action remake, behind the 2019 photorealistic animated The Lion King.
  - It also set the record for the biggest opening weekend for a live-action animated film, surpassing Detective Pikachu.
  - It became the highest-grossing live-action animated film, surpassing The Smurfs (2011), as well as the first live-action animated film to globally gross at least $1 billion.
  - The Lilo & Stitch film series has grossed more than $1.3 billion with the release of the live-action remake, with the latter contributing roughly 79% of that figure.
- Demon Slayer: Kimetsu no Yaiba Infinity Castle grossed about $793 million worldwide to become the highest-grossing Japanese film of all time, surpassing its predecessor Demon Slayer: Kimetsu no Yaiba Mugen Train.
  - Worldwide, it became the highest-grossing Japanese film and the highest-grossing anime film of all time. It is also the first Japanese film to cross $700 million worldwide.
  - In Japan, it had the biggest opening weekend of all time with ¥5.52 billion in three days. It passed ¥10 billion in eight days, becoming the fastest‑grossing film ever in Japan.
  - In the US, its $70 million opening weekend was the biggest opening for an international film, R‑rated animated film, and September animated release. It went on to set US records for the highest-grossing anime film (surpassing Pokémon: The First Movie), highest-grossing Japanese film, first anime film to cross $100 million, and highest-grossing international film (surpassing Crouching Tiger, Hidden Dragon).
  - In other international markets, the film had the biggest opening weekend for an animated film in the Philippines, South Korea, and India. It became the all-time highest-grossing anime film in Brazil, Hong Kong, India, Indonesia, Malaysia, Mexico, Philippines, Spain, and Thailand.
  - The Demon Slayer: Kimetsu no Yaiba franchise became the first R-rated animated film series to surpass $1 billion with the release of Infinity Castle.
  - It became the highest-grossing hand drawn animated film in its initial release, surpassing the initial gross of The Lion King (1994), which grossed $763 million in its initial release and held the record for 31 years.
- The How to Train Your Dragon franchise surpassed $2 billion with the release of the live-action remake of the same name. It became the highest grossing film in the franchise, surpassing How to Train Your Dragon 2.
- F1 achieved Apple Studios's highest-grossing opening weekend at $144 million worldwide, and passed Napoleon to become the producer's highest-grossing film worldwide.
- The Superman film series surpassed $3 billion with the release of Superman.
- The Marvel Cinematic Universe became the first film franchise to gross $32 billion with the releases of Captain America: Brave New World, Thunderbolts*, and The Fantastic Four: First Steps.

== Events ==
=== Award ceremonies ===
Date	Event	Host	Location(s)	Ref.
January 5	82nd Golden Globe Awards	Golden Globes, LLC	Beverly Hills, U.S.	
January 18	17th Gaudí Awards	Catalan Film Academy	Barcelona, Spain	
January 20	30th Lumière Awards	Académie des Lumières	Paris, France	
January 25	12th Feroz Awards	Asociación de Informadores Cinematográficos de España	Pontevedra, Spain	
February 1	4th Carmen Awards	Academia del Cine de Andalucía	Córdoba, Spain	
February 2	52nd Saturn Awards	Academy of Science Fiction, Fantasy and Horror Films	Universal City, U.S.	
February 7	14th AACTA Awards	Australian Academy of Cinema and Television Arts	Gold Coast, Australia	
February 7	14th AACTA International Awards	Australian Academy of Cinema and Television Arts	Gold Coast, Australia	
February 7	30th Critics' Choice Awards	Critics Choice Association	Santa Monica, U.S.	
February 7	2025 Movieguide Awards	Movieguide	Los Angeles, U.S.	
February 8	36th Producers Guild of America Awards	Producers Guild of America	Los Angeles, U.S.	
February 8	39th Goya Awards	Academy of Cinematographic Arts and Sciences of Spain	Granada, Spain	
February 8	52nd Annie Awards	ASIFA-Hollywood	Los Angeles, U.S.	
February 8	77th Directors Guild of America Awards	Directors Guild of America	Beverly Hills, U.S.	
February 15	77th Writers Guild of America Awards	Writers Guild of America, East; Writers Guild of America West	New York City, U.S. Los Angeles, U.S.	
February 16	78th British Academy Film Awards	British Academy of Film and Television Arts	London, UK	
February 22	14th Magritte Awards	Académie André Delvaux	Ixelles, Belgium	
February 22	40th Independent Spirit Awards	Independent Spirit Awards	Santa Monica, U.S.	
February 23	31st Screen Actors Guild Awards	SAG-AFTRA	Los Angeles, U.S.	
February 28	50th César Awards	Académie des Arts et Techniques du Cinéma	Paris, France	
February 28	45th Golden Raspberry Awards	Golden Raspberry Awards Foundation	Los Angeles, U.S.	
March 2	97th Academy Awards	Academy of Motion Picture Arts and Sciences	Los Angeles, U.S.	
March 8 – 9	25th International Indian Film Academy Awards	International Indian Film Academy	Jaipur, India	
March 10	33rd Actors and Actresses Union Awards	Actors and Actresses Union	Madrid, Spain	
April 27	12th Platino Awards	EGEDA, FIPCA	Madrid, Spain	
May 7	70th David di Donatello	Accademia del Cinema Italiano	Rome, Italy	
May 25	9th Crunchyroll Anime Awards	Crunchyroll	Tokyo, Japan	
May 30-June 1	13th Canadian Screen Awards	Academy of Canadian Cinema & Television	Toronto, Canada	
June 21	38th Kids' Choice Awards	Barker Hangar	Santa Monica, California	
July 23	19th Sur Awards	Argentine Academy of Cinematography Arts and Sciences	Córdoba, Argentina	
September 20	67th Ariel Awards	Academia Mexicana de Artes y Ciencias Cinematográficas	Puerto Vallarta, Mexico	
October 11	70th Filmfare Awards	The Times Group	Ahmedabad, India	
November 27	18th Asia Pacific Screen Awards	UNESCO, FIAPF (International Federation of Film Producers Associations) and the Brisbane City Council, in partnership with APSA and Jewel Private Residences	Gold Coast, Australia	
December 13	31st Forqué Awards	EGEDA	Madrid, Spain	

=== Film festivals ===
Date	Event	Host	Location(s)	Ref.
January 23 – February 2	2025 Sundance Film Festival	Sundance Film Festival	Park City, U.S.	
January 30 – February 9	54th International Film Festival Rotterdam	International Film Festival Rotterdam	Rotterdam, Netherlands	
February 4 – 15	40th Santa Barbara International Film Festival	Santa Barbara International Film Festival	Santa Barbara, U.S.	
February 13 – 23	75th Berlin International Film Festival	Berlin International Film Festival	Berlin, Germany	
February 18 – 22	14th Oceanside International Film Festival	Oceanside International Film Festival	Oceanside, U.S.	
February 26 – March 9	21st Glasgow Film Festival	Glasgow Film Festival	Glasgow, UK	
March 14 – 23	28th Málaga Film Festival	Málaga Film Festival	Málaga, Spain	
March 19 – 30	39th BFI Flare	BFI Flare: London LGBTIQ+ Film Festival	London, UK	
March 19 – 30	CPH:DOX 2025	Copenhagen International Documentary Film Festival (CPH:DOX)	Copenhagen, Denmark	
May 13 – 24	2025 Cannes Film Festival	Cannes Film Festival	Cannes, France	
May 15 – 25	2025 Seattle International Film Festival	Seattle International Film Festival	Seattle, U.S.	
June 6 – 14	40th Guadalajara International Film Festival	Guadalajara International Film Festival	Guadalajara, Mexico	
June 8 – 14	2025 Annecy International Animation Film Festival	Annecy International Animation Film Festival	Annecy, France	
June 13 – 22	27th Shanghai International Film Festival	Shanghai International Film Festival	Shanghai, China	
July 4 – July 12	59th Karlovy Vary International Film Festival	Karlovy Vary International Film Festival	Karlovy Vary, Czech Republic	
11 – 27 July	24th New York Asian Film Festival	New York Asian Film Foundation Inc.	New York, U.S.	
17 July – 3 August	29th Fantasia International Film Festival	Festival Fantasia Inc	Montreal, Canada	
19 July – 27 July	8th Malaysia International Film Festival	Jazzy Group (M) Sdn Bhd.	Kuala Lumpur, Malaysia	
6 – 16 August	78th Locarno Film Festival	Locarno Film Festival	Locarno, Switzerland	
August 14 – 20	78th Edinburgh International Film Festival	Edinburgh International Film Festival	Edinburgh, UK	
August 15 – 22	31st Sarajevo Film Festival	Sarajevo Film Festival	Sarajevo, Bosnia & Herzegovina	
August 16 – 22	53rd Norwegian International Film Festival	Norwegian International Film Festival	Haugesund, Norway	
August 27 – September 6	82nd Venice International Film Festival	Venice Film Festival	Venice, Italy	
August 28 – September 1	52nd Telluride Film Festival	Telluride Film Festival	Telluride, U.S.	
September 4 – 14	2025 Toronto International Film Festival	Toronto International Film Festival	Toronto, Canada	
September 17 – 26	30th Busan International Film Festival	Busan International Film Festival	Busan, South Korea	
September 19 – 27	73rd San Sebastián International Film Festival	San Sebastián International Film Festival	San Sebastián, Spain	
September 26 - October 13	2025 New York Film Festival	New York Film Festival	New York City, U.S.	
October 8 – 19	2025 BFI London Film Festival	London Film Festival	London, UK	
October 9 – 19	58th Sitges Film Festival	Sitges Film Festival	Sitges, Spain	
October 15 – 26	20th Rome Film Festival	Rome Film Festival	Rome, Italy	
October 24 – November 1	70th Valladolid International Film Festival	Valladolid International Film Festival	Valladolid, Spain	
October 27 – November 5	38th Tokyo International Film Festival	Tokyo International Film Festival	Tokyo, Japan	
November 5 – 16	2025 Stockholm International Film Festival	Stockholm International Film Festival	Stockholm, Sweden	
November 20 – 28	56th International Film Festival of India	Directorate of Film Festivals	Goa, India	

== Awards ==
Category	31st Critics' Choice Awards January 4, 2026	83rd Golden Globe Awards January 11, 2026		79th BAFTA Awards February 22, 2026	Producers, Directors, Actors, and Writers Guild Awards February 7 - March 8, 2026	98th Academy Awards March 15, 2026
Category	31st Critics' Choice Awards January 4, 2026	Drama	Musical or Comedy	79th BAFTA Awards February 22, 2026	Producers, Directors, Actors, and Writers Guild Awards February 7 - March 8, 2026	98th Academy Awards March 15, 2026
Best Picture	One Battle After Another	Hamnet	One Battle After Another			
Best Director	Paul Thomas Anderson; One Battle After Another					
Best Actor	Timothée Chalamet; Marty Supreme	Wagner Moura; The Secret Agent	Timothée Chalamet; Marty Supreme	Robert Aramayo; I Swear	Michael B. Jordan; Sinners	
Best Actress	Jessie Buckley; Hamnet		Rose Byrne; If I Had Legs I'd Kick You	Jessie Buckley; Hamnet		
Best Supporting Actor	Jacob Elordi; Frankenstein	Stellan Skarsgård; Sentimental Value		Sean Penn; One Battle After Another		
Best Supporting Actress	Amy Madigan; Weapons	Teyana Taylor; One Battle After Another		Wunmi Mosaku; Sinners	Amy Madigan; Weapons	
Best Screenplay, Adapted	Paul Thomas Anderson; One Battle After Another	Paul Thomas Anderson; One Battle After Another		Paul Thomas Anderson; One Battle After Another		
Best Screenplay, Original	Ryan Coogler; Sinners	Paul Thomas Anderson; One Battle After Another		Ryan Coogler; Sinners		
Best Animated Film	KPop Demon Hunters			Zootopia 2	KPop Demon Hunters	
Best Original Score	Ludwig Göransson; Sinners				—N/a	Ludwig Göransson; Sinners
Best Original Song	"Golden"; KPop Demon Hunters			—N/a	—N/a	"Golden"; KPop Demon Hunters
Best Foreign Language Film	The Secret Agent			Sentimental Value	—N/a	Sentimental Value
Best Documentary (Note: From 2016 onward, the category was shifted from the Critics' Choice Awards to the ancillary Critics' Choice Documentary Awards.)	The Perfect Neighbor	—N/a		Mr Nobody Against Putin	My Mom Jayne	Mr Nobody Against Putin

Golden Bear (75th Berlin International Film Festival):

Dreams (Sex Love), directed by Dag Johan Haugerud, Norway

Palme d'Or (78th Cannes Film Festival):

It Was Just an Accident, directed by Jafar Panahi, Iran

Golden Lion (82nd Venice International Film Festival):

Father Mother Sister Brother, directed by Jim Jarmusch, United States

People's Choice Award (50th Toronto International Film Festival):

Hamnet, directed by Chloé Zhao, United Kingdom & United States

== 2025 films ==
=== By country/region ===
- List of American films of 2025
- List of Argentine films of 2025
- List of Australian films of 2025
- List of Bangladeshi films of 2025
- List of British films of 2025
- List of Canadian films of 2025
- List of Chinese films of 2025
- List of French films of 2025
- List of German films of 2025
- List of Hong Kong films of 2025
- List of Indian films of 2025
- List of Italian films of 2025
- List of Japanese films of 2025
- List of Mexican films of 2025
- List of Pakistani films of 2025
- List of Philippine films of 2025
- List of Portuguese films of 2025
- List of South Korean films of 2025
- List of Spanish films of 2025

=== By genre/medium ===
- List of animated feature films of 2025
- List of comedy films of 2025
- List of drama films of 2025
- List of horror films of 2025
- List of science fiction films of 2025
- List of thriller films of 2025

== Deaths ==
Month	Date	Name	Age	Country	Profession	Notable films	Ref.
January	1	Nora Orlandi	91	Italy	Composer	The Strange Vice of Mrs. Wardh; Johnny Yuma	
January	2	Jytte Abildstrøm	90	Denmark	Actress	The Adventures of Picasso; Sytten	
January	3	Jeff Baena	47	US	Director, Screenwriter	Horse Girl; Life After Beth	
January	4	Emilio Echevarría	80	Mexico	Actor	Amores perros; Die Another Day	
January	4	Julien Poulin	78	Canada	Actor, Director, Screenwriter	February 15, 1839; Séraphin: Heart of Stone	
January	4	Ronnie Yeskel	76	US	Casting Director	Reservoir Dogs; Pulp Fiction	
January	8	Charles Kay	94	UK	Actor	Amadeus; Henry V	
January	8	Pritish Nandy	73	India	Producer	Kuch Khatti Kuch Meethi; Mastizaade	
January	9	Bill Byrge	92	US	Actor	Ernest Saves Christmas; Ernest Scared Stupid	
January	9	Phyllis Dalton	99	UK	Costume Designer	Lawrence of Arabia; The Princess Bride	
January	9	Jorge Luis Sánchez	64	Cuba	Director	El Benny; Buscando a Casal	
January	9	Otto Schenk	94	Austria	Actor	Dunja; Always Trouble with the Reverend	
January	10	Christopher Benjamin	90	UK	Actor	The Plague Dogs; The Legend of Tarzan	
January	10	Yevgenia Dobrovolskaya	60	Russia	Actress	Actress; The Irony of Fate 2	
January	11	James McEachin	94	US	Actor	Coogan's Bluff; Play Misty for Me	
January	12	Leslie Charleson	79	US	Actress	The Day of the Dolphin; Cheering Section	
January	12	Claude Jarman Jr.	90	US	Actor	The Yearling; Rio Grande	
January	12	Robert Machray	79	US	Actor	Cutting Class; The Master of Disguise	
January	12	Lynne Taylor-Corbett	78	US	Choreographer	Footloose; My Blue Heaven	
January	12	Kim Yaroshevskaya	101	Canada	Actress	Anne Trister; Straight for the Heart	
January	14	Tony Slattery	65	UK	Actor, Comedian	The Crying Game; Peter's Friends	
January	15	Anna Maria Ackermann	92	Italy	Actress	'O Re; Si accettano miracoli	
January	15	Tommy Dix	101	US	Actor	Best Foot Forward; Andy Hardy's Blonde Trouble	
January	15	Diane Langton	80	UK	Actress	Eskimo Nell; The Cook, the Thief, His Wife & Her Lover	
January	15	David Lynch	78	US	Director, Screenwriter, Producer	Blue Velvet; Mulholland Drive	
January	15	Jeannot Szwarc	85	France	Director	Jaws 2; Somewhere in Time	
January	16	Jack De Mave	91	US	Actor	Blindfold; The Man Without a Face	
January	16	Joan Plowright	95	UK	Actress	Enchanted April; 101 Dalmatians	
January	16	Bob Uecker	90	US	Actor	Major League; Homeward Bound II: Lost in San Francisco	
January	16	Shoji Ueda	87	Japan	Cinematographer	Ran; Kagemusha	
January	17	Jules Feiffer	95	US	Screenwriter	Carnal Knowledge; Little Murders	
January	17	Jan Shepard	96	US	Actress	King Creole; Paradise, Hawaiian Style	
January	17	Robert Verrall	97	Canada	Animator, Producer, Director	What on Earth!; The Family That Dwelt Apart	
January	18	Ze'ev Revach	84	Israel	Actor, Comedian	Charlie Ve'hetzi; Hagiga B'Snuker	
January	20	Bertrand Blier	85	France	Director, Screenwriter	Get Out Your Handkerchiefs; 1, 2, 3, Sun	
January	20	Harald Paalgard	74	Norway	Cinematographer	Orion's Belt; Dreamplay	
January	22	Barry Michael Cooper	67	US	Screenwriter	New Jack City; Above the Rim	
January	22	Nicholas Eadie	67	Australia	Actor	The Man from Snowy River II; Celia	
January	22	Jim Tauber	74	US	Producer	The Place Beyond the Pines; The Age of Adaline	
January	25	Gloria Romero	91	Philippines	Actress	Tanging Yaman; Rainbow's Sunset	
January	26	Shafi	56	India	Director	One Man Show; Kalyanaraman	
January	27	Alma Rosa Aguirre	95	Mexico	Actress	The Stronger Sex; The Border Man	
January	28	Horst Janson	89	Germany	Actor	Murphy's War; Captain Kronos – Vampire Hunter	
January	29	Joe Hale	99	US	Animator, Layout Artist, Producer	The Fox and the Hound; The Black Cauldron	
January	29	Atomu Shimojō	78	Japan	Actor	Brother and Sister; House on Fire	
January	30	Marianne Faithfull	78	UK	Actress, Singer	Marie Antoinette; Intimacy	
January	31	Táňa Radeva	67	Slovakia	Actress	Lóve; Dubček	
January	31	Kärt Tomingas	57	Estonia	Actress, Singer	Those Old Love Letters; Zero Point	
February	2	Barbie Hsu	48	Taiwan	Actress, Singer	Connected; Hot Summer Days	
February	2	Lee Joo-sil	80	South Korea	Actress	Train to Busan; The Sword with No Name	
February	2	P. H. Moriarty	86	UK	Actor	The Long Good Friday; Lock, Stock and Two Smoking Barrels	
February	2	Brian Murphy	92	UK	Actor	The Devils; The Boy Friend	
February	4	Pushpalatha	87	India	Actress	Sengottai Singam; Naanum Oru Penn	
February	7	Bruce French	79	US	Actor	Christine; Mission: Impossible III	
February	7	Tony Roberts	85	US	Actor	Serpico; Annie Hall	
February	9	Mara Corday	95	US	Actress	Tarantula; The Giant Claw	
February	9	Oleg Strizhenov	95	Russia	Actor	The Gadfly; The Mexican	
February	10	Peter Tuiasosopo	61	US	Actor	Necessary Roughness; Street Fighter	
February	11	Moses Lim	75	Singapore	Actor	One Leg Kicking; Just Follow Law	
February	11	Norma Mora	82	Mexico	Actress	Qué perra vida; Los astronautas	
February	12	Niké Arrighi	80	France	Actress	The Devil Rides Out; Women in Love	
February	12	Jerry Eisenberg	87	US	Layout Artist	The Man Called Flintstone; Charlotte's Web	
February	13	John Lawlor	83	US	Actor	S.O.B.; Wyatt Earp	
February	14	Carlos Diegues	84	Brazil	Director, Producer, Screenwriter	The Greatest Love of All; The Great Mystical Circus	
February	14	Alice Hirson	95	US	Actress	Being There; Revenge of the Nerds	
February	14	Kevyn Major Howard	69	Canada	Actor	Sudden Impact; Full Metal Jacket	
February	14	Geneviève Page	97	France	Actress	The Private Life of Sherlock Holmes; Belle de Jour	
February	15	George Armitage	82	US	Director	Miami Blues; Grosse Pointe Blank	
February	16	Julian Holloway	80	UK	Actor	Catch Us If You Can; Carry On	
February	16	Kim Sae-ron	24	South Korea	Actress	A Brand New Life; The Villagers	
February	16	Krishnaveni	100	India	Actress	Malli Pelli; Gollabhama	
February	16	Yolanda Montes	93	Mexico	Actress	Nocturne of Love; Isle of the Snake People	
February	19	Souleymane Cissé	84	Mali	Director	The Young Girl; Yeelen	
February	19	Olive Sturgess	91	Canada	Actress	The Kettles in the Ozarks; The Raven	
February	20	Peter Jason	80	US	Actor	48 Hrs.; They Live	
February	21	Lynne Marie Stewart	78	US	Actress	American Graffiti; Pee-wee's Big Adventure	
February	23	Pilar Del Rey	95	US	Actress	The Kid from Texas; Giant	
February	25	Roberto Orci	51	US	Screenwriter, Producer	Transformers; Star Trek	
February	26 (Note: The day he was found dead.)	Gene Hackman	95	US	Actor	The French Connection; Unforgiven	
February	26	Lis Nilheim	80	Sweden	Actress	Äktenskapsbrottaren; Raskenstam	
February	26	Renen Schorr	72	Israel	Director, Screenwriter, Producer	Late Summer Blues; The Loners	
February	26	Michelle Trachtenberg	39	US	Actress	Harriet the Spy; Ice Princess	
February	26	Monika Lundi	82	Germany	Actress	The Captain; No Gold for a Dead Diver	
February	27	Michael Preece	88	US	Script Supervisor, Director	How the West Was Won; The Getaway	
February	28	David Johansen	75	US	Actor, Singer	Scrooged; Let It Ride	
February	28	Joseph Wambaugh	88	US	Screenwriter	The Onion Field; The Black Marble	
March	1	Angie Stone	63	US	Actress, Singer	The Hot Chick; The Fighting Temptations	
March	2	Juan Margallo	84	Spain	Actor	Champions; Close Your Eyes	
March	3	Eleonora Giorgi	71	Italy	Actress, Director	Talcum Powder; To Forget Venice	
March	4	Gene Winfield	97	US	Automotive Designer	Blade Runner; RoboCop	
March	5	Edesio Alejandro	66	Cuba	Composer	Clandestinos; Hello Hemingway	
March	5	Denise Alexander	85	US	Actress	Crime in the Streets; That Funny Feeling	
March	5	Pamela Bach	61	US	Actress	Appointment with Fear; Route 66	
March	6	Crystal-Donna Roberts	40	South Africa	Actress	Chronicle; The Endless River	
March	6	Árpád Sopsits	72	Hungary	Director	Abandoned; Strangled	
March	8	Athol Fugard	92	South Africa	Actor, Screenwriter	Gandhi; The Killing Fields	
March	9	Eileen Bennett	105	UK	Actress	Much Too Shy; Thursday's Child	
March	9	Simon Fisher-Becker	63	UK	Actor	Harry Potter and the Philosopher's Stone; Les Misérables	
March	9	Hans Peter Korff	82	Germany	Actor	Circle of Deceit; Beresina, or the Last Days of Switzerland	
March	10	Stanley R. Jaffe	84	US	Producer	Kramer vs. Kramer; Fatal Attraction	
March	11	Ayumi Ishida	76	Japan	Actress, Singer	Submersion of Japan; Hearts and Flowers for Tora-san	
March	11	Dave Mallow	76	US	Actor, Voice Actor	Digimon: The Movie; The Hungover Games	
March	11	Clive Revill	94	New Zealand	Actor	The Private Life of Sherlock Holmes; The Empire Strikes Back	
March	11	Robert Trebor	71	US	Actor	52 Pick-Up; My Demon Lover	
March	12	Bruce Glover	92	US	Actor	Diamonds Are Forever; Chinatown	
March	13	Sofia Gubaidulina	93	Russia	Composer	Vertical; Scarecrow	
March	13	Maria Grazia Spina	88	Italy	Actress	Rugantino; The Bible: In the Beginning...	
March	14	Deb Mukherjee	83	India	Actor	Aansoo Ban Gaye Phool; Karate	
March	15	Wings Hauser	78	US	Actor	Vice Squad; The Insider	
March	15	Delia Razon	94	Philippines	Actress	Gaano Kadalas ang Minsan?; Ipagpatawad Mo	
March	16	Émilie Dequenne	43	Belgium	Actress	Rosetta; Brotherhood of the Wolf	
March	16	Bindu Ghosh	76	India	Actress	Kozhi Koovuthu; Osai	
March	18	Nadia Cassini	76	Italy	Actress	Pulp; Starcrash	
March	18	Antonio Gasalla	84	Argentina	Actor	The Truce; Clams and Mussels	
March	21	Štefan Kvietik	90	Slovakia	Actor	The Millennial Bee; Sitting on a Branch, Enjoying Myself	
March	21	Filiz Akın	82	Turkey	Actress	Tatlı Dillim; Karateci Kız	
March	22	Larisa Golubkina	85	Russia	Actress	Hussar Ballad; Give Me a Book of Complaints	
March	23	Gianfranco Barra	84	Italy	Actor	Bread and Chocolate; The Talented Mr. Ripley	
March	25	Denis Arndt	86	US	Actor	Basic Instinct; S.W.A.T.	
March	25	Maria Gustafsson	79	Sweden	Actress	Cemetery Without Crosses; No desearás al vecino del quinto	
March	25	Shihan Hussaini	60	India	Actor	Punnagai Mannan; Velaikkaran	
March	25	Masahiro Shinoda	94	Japan	Director, Screenwriter	Pale Flower; MacArthur's Children	
March	25	William Steinkamp	71	US	Film Editor	Tootsie; Out of Africa	
March	26	Aleksei Veselkin	63	Russia	Actor	Egorka; Armavir	
March	27	Ku Feng	94	Hong Kong	Actor	The Love Eterne; Hail the Judge	
March	28	Richard Norton	75	Australia	Actor, Stuntman	The Octagon; Twinkle, Twinkle, Lucky Stars	
March	29	Ángel del Pozo	90	Spain	Actor	The Big Gundown; Treasure Island	
March	29	Richard Chamberlain	90	US	Actor, Singer	The Three Musketeers; The Towering Inferno	
March	30	Lee Montague	97	UK	Actor	Brother Sun, Sister Moon; Brass Target	
March	31	Sian Barbara Allen	78	US	Actress	You'll Like My Mother; Billy Two Hats	
March	31	Yves Boisset	86	France	Director, Screenwriter	The Common Man; The Purple Taxi	
March	31	Patty Maloney	89	US	Actress	The Ice Pirates; The Addams Family	
April	1	Alfi Kabiljo	89	Croatia	Composer	The Girl; Scissors	
April	1	Val Kilmer	65	US	Actor	Top Gun; Batman Forever	
April	2	Alois Švehlík	85	Czech Republic	Actor	Alois Nebel; On the Roof	
April	3	John Saint Ryan	72	UK	Actor	American Cyborg: Steel Warrior; Squanto: A Warrior's Tale	
April	4	Paul Karo	89	Australia	Actor	Death of a Soldier; Evil Angels	
April	4	Manoj Kumar	87	India	Actor, Director	Roti Kapada Aur Makaan; Kranti	
April	4	Ravikumar	71	India	Actor	Ullasa Yaathra; Aanandham Paramaanandham	
April	5	Antonello Fassari	72	Italy	Actor	Who Killed Pasolini?; Suburra	
April	5	Colin Fox	86	Canada	Actor	Tommy Boy; Daylight	
April	6	Jay North	73	US	Actor	Zebra in the Kitchen; Maya	
April	6	Marlene Warfield	83	US	Actress	Across 110th Street; Network	
April	7	Marvin Levy	96	US	Publicist	Taxi Driver; Saving Private Ryan	
April	7	Joey D. Vieira	80	US	Actor	Ferris Bueller's Day Off; Red Heat	
April	8	Nicky Katt	54	US	Actor	Insomnia; Sin City	
April	9	Mel Novak	90	US	Actor	Game of Death; An Eye for an Eye	
April	10	Ted Kotcheff	94	Canada	Director	First Blood; Weekend at Bernie's	
April	10	Bruce Logan	78	US	Visual Effects Artist, Cinematographer	Star Wars; Tron	
April	10	Mario Ernesto Sánchez	78	Cuba	Actor	Invasion U.S.A.; The Specialist	
April	12	Pilita Corrales	85	Philippines	Actress, Singer	Mars Ravelo's Darna! Ang Pagbabalik; Bride for Rent	
April	12	Andrea Blaugrund Nevins	63	US	Documentarian	Still Kicking: The Fabulous Palm Springs Follies; The Other F Word	
April	13	Paddy Higson	83	UK	Producer	Comfort and Joy; The Magdalene Sisters	
April	13	Jean Marsh	90	UK	Actress	Frenzy; Willow	
April	14	Sophie Nyweide	24	US	Actress	Bella; Mammoth	
April	15	Jadwiga Jankowska-Cieślak	74	Poland	Actress	Another Way; Sweet Rush	
April	16	Patrick Adiarte	81	Philippines	Actor	The King and I; Flower Drum Song	
April	16	Nora Aunor	71	Philippines	Actress, Singer	Bona; Himala	
April	16	Joanne Gilbert	92	US	Actress	Red Garters; The Great Man	
April	17	Mizuki Itagaki	24	Japan	Actor	Solomon's Perjury; Hot Gimmick: Girl Meets Boy	
April	18	Damien Thomas	83	UK	Actor	Twins of Evil; Pirates	
April	20 (Note: The day his death was announced.)	Kimble Rendall	67	Australia	Second Unit Director	The Matrix; I, Robot	
April	21	Will Hutchins	94	US	Actor	No Time for Sergeants; The Shooting	
April	21	Gerard Kennedy	93	Australia	Actor	Raw Deal; The Last of the Knucklemen	
April	22	Lar Park Lincoln	63	US	Actress	House II: The Second Story; Friday the 13th Part VII: The New Blood	
April	22	Erik Ruus	62	Estonia	Actor	Vaatleja; All My Lenins	
April	23	Chris Cauwenberghs	78	Belgium	Actor	Hector; Koko Flanel	
April	23	Waltraut Haas	97	Austria	Actress, Singer	Der Hofrat Geiger; Mariandl	
April	27	Jiggly Caliente	44	Philippines	Drag Performer, Actress, Singer	The Queens; Milkwater	
April	27	Cora Sue Collins	98	US	Actress	The Adventures of Tom Sawyer; All This, and Heaven Too	
April	28	Andrew Karpen	59	US	Producer	Denial; The Art of Self-Defense	
April	28	Shaji N. Karun	73	India	Director	Piravi; Kutty Srank	
April	28	Priscilla Pointer	100	US	Actress	Carrie; Blue Velvet	
April	30	Park Hee-gon	56	South Korea	Director	Catman; Don't Buy the Seller	
May	1	Ruth Buzzi	88	US	Actress, Singer, Comedian	The Apple Dumpling Gang Rides Again; Chu Chu and the Philly Flash	
May	1	Charley Scalies	84	US	Actor	12 Monkeys; Liberty Heights	
May	1	Ricky Davao	63	Philippines	Actor, Director	American Adobo; Sosyal Climbers	
May	3	Humaira Ali	65	Pakistan	Actress	Bol; Tich Button	
May	3	Greg Cannom	74	US	Makeup Artist	Bram Stoker's Dracula; Mrs. Doubtfire	
May	5	Joan O'Brien	89	US	Actress, Singer	Operation Petticoat; It Happened at the World's Fair	
May	6	James Foley	71	US	Director	Glengarry Glen Ross; Fear	
May	7	Joe Don Baker	89	US	Actor	Walking Tall; The Living Daylights	
May	7	Rosanna Norton	80	US	Costume Designer	Airplane!; Tron	
May	7	Madhav Vaze	85	India	Actor	Shyamch Aai; 3 Idiots	
May	8	Jiří Bartoška	78	Czech Republic	Actor	Sekal Has to Die; Tiger Theory	
May	10	Nina Grebeshkova	94	Russia	Actress	The Diamond Arm; Sportloto-82	
May	11	Robert Benton	92	US	Director, Screenwriter	Kramer vs. Kramer; Places in the Heart	
May	11	Leila Negra	95	Germany	Actress, Singer	Toxi; Salto Mortale	
May	12	Lorna Raver	81	US	Actress	Drag Me to Hell; The Caller	
May	13	Yaak Karsunke	90	Germany	Actor	Love Is Colder Than Death; Gods of the Plague	
May	15	Taina Elg	95	Finland	Actress	Les Girls; The 39 Steps	
May	15	Federica Ranchi	86	Italy	Actress	Violent Summer; Son of Samson	
May	15	Charles Strouse	96	US	Composer	Bonnie and Clyde; Annie	
May	16	Meta Velander	100	Sweden	Actress	The Man Who Quit Smoking; Deadline	
May	16	Gerard Soeteman	88	Netherlands	Screenwriter	The Assault; Black Book	
May	17	Gawn Grainger	87	UK	Actor	Mastermind; The Raggedy Rawney	
May	17	Franco Merli	68	Italy	Actor	Arabian Nights; Salò, or the 120 Days of Sodom	
May	19	Aurora Clavel	88	Mexico	Actress	Tarahumara; Once Upon a Scoundrel	
May	19	Kathleen Hughes	96	US	Actress	It Came from Outer Space; Revenge	
May	20	Nino Benvenuti	87	Italy	Actor	Sundance and the Kid; Mark Shoots First	
May	20	Leslie Dilley	84	UK	Art Director, Production Designer	Star Wars; Raiders of the Lost Ark	
May	20	Michael Roemer	97	US	Director, Producer, Screenwriter	Nothing but a Man; The Plot Against Harry	
May	20	George Wendt	76	US	Actor	Fletch; Gung Ho	
May	21	Mariano Ozores	98	Spain	Director, Screenwriter	Cristóbal Colón, de oficio... descubridor; Operation Mata Hari	
May	21 (Note: The day his death was announced.)	Billy Williams	96	UK	Cinematographer	On Golden Pond; Gandhi	
May	22	Pippa Scott	90	US	Actress	The Searchers; Auntie Mame	
May	23	Mukul Dev	54	India	Actor	R... Rajkumar; Jai Ho	
May	23	Barbara Ferris	88	UK	Actress	Catch Us If You Can; Interlude	
May	23	Mohammed Lakhdar-Hamina	91	Algeria	Director, Screenwriter	Chronicle of the Years of Fire; Sandstorm	
May	24	Marcel Ophuls	97	Germany	Documentarian	The Sorrow and the Pity; Hotel Terminus: The Life and Times of Klaus Barbie	
May	24	Teresita Reyes	75	Chile	Actress	The Toast; Santos	
May	25	Monna Tandberg	85	Norway	Actress	Victoria L; Bryllupsfesten	
May	25	Marie Tomášová	96	Czech Republic	Actress	Anna Proletářka; Jan Hus	
May	26	Frances Doel	83	UK	Producer, Screenwriter	Big Bad Mama; Crazy Mama	
May	26	Co Hoedeman	84	Canada	Animator, Director, Screenwriter	The Sand Castle; Ludovic: The Snow Gift	
May	27	Freddie Aguilar	72	Philippines	Composer, Singer	Tadhana; Sa Kuko ng Agila	
May	27	Choi Jung-woo	68	South Korea	Actor	Another Public Enemy; Lady Vengeance	
May	27	Presley Chweneyagae	40	South Africa	Actor	Tsotsi; iNumber Number	
May	27	Vasily Funtikov	62	Russia	Actor	An Umbrella for Lovers; The Sisters Liberty	
May	27	Ed Gale	61	US	Actor, Stunt Performer	Howard the Duck; Child's Play	
May	27	Peter Kwong	73	US	Actor	Big Trouble in Little China; The Golden Child	
May	29	Alf Clausen	84	US	Composer, Orchestrator	Ferris Bueller's Day Off; Half Baked	
May	29	Rajesh	75	India	Actor	Autograph; Varalaru	
May	30	Prentis Hancock	83	UK	Actor	The Thirty Nine Steps; Defence of the Realm	
May	30	Valerie Mahaffey	71	US	Actress	Jungle 2 Jungle; Seabiscuit	
May	30	Loretta Swit	87	US	Actress	Race with the Devil; Beer	
May	30	Renée Victor	86	US	Actress, Singer	Paranormal Activity: The Marked Ones; Coco	
June	1	Jonathan Joss	59	US	Actor	True Grit; The Magnificent Seven	
June	1	Ilselil Larsen	90	Denmark	Actress	Barnet; Love Wins Out	
June	1	Monica Nielsen	87	Sweden	Actress, Singer	The Cats; The Princess	
June	3	Eugen Doga	88	Moldova	Composer	A Hunting Accident; Anna Pavlova	
June	4	Nicole Croisille	88	France	Actress, Singer	Les Uns et les Autres; Les Misérables	
June	4	Philippe Labro	88	France	Director	Sans mobile apparent; Rive droite, rive gauche	
June	4	Pietro Ghislandi	68	Italy	Actor	The Invisible Wall; Belle al Bar	
June	4	Enzo Staiola	85	Italy	Actor	Bicycle Thieves; The White Line	
June	6	Marise Wipani	61	New Zealand	Actress	Came a Hot Friday; Grievous Bodily Harm	
June	7	Vladimír Smutný	82	Czech Republic	Cinematographer	Kolya; The Painted Bird	
June	8	Ewa Dałkowska	78	Poland	Actress	A Year of the Quiet Sun; Korczak	
June	9	Partho Ghosh	75	India	Director, Producer, Screenwriter	100 Days; Agni Sakshi	
June	9	Pik-Sen Lim	80	Malaysia	Actress	Plenty; Johnny English Reborn	
June	9	Chris Robinson	86	US	Actor, Director, Screenwriter	The Young Savages; Birdman of Alcatraz	
June	10	Harris Yulin	87	US	Actor	Scarface; Training Day	
June	11	Ayumu Saito	60	Japan	Actor	13 Assassins; The Magnificent Nine	
June	13	Betsy Gay	96	US	Actress	Mystery Plane; What's Buzzin', Cousin?	
June	13	Katerina Yioulaki	87	Greece	Actress	My Friend Lefterakis; Oi kyries tis avlis	
June	14	Topsy Küppers	93	Austria	Actress	Guitars of Love; Three Girls from the Rhine	
June	16	Dave Scott	52	US	Choreographer	You Got Served; Step Up 2: The Streets	
June	16	Manuel Zarzo	93	Spain	Actor	The Holy Innocents; Entre tinieblas	
June	18	Mark Peploe	82	UK	Screenwriter	The Last Emperor; The Sheltering Sky	
June	19	Jack Betts	96	US	Actor	Gods and Monsters; Spider-Man	
June	19	Lynn Hamilton	95	US	Actress	Lady Sings the Blues; The Vanishing	
June	19	Gailard Sartain	81	US	Actor	The Buddy Holly Story; Mississippi Burning	
June	21	Valentina Talyzina	90	Russia	Actress	Afonya; Agony	
June	22	Aki Aleong	90	US	Actor	Braddock: Missing in Action III; Dragon: The Bruce Lee Story	
June	22	Joe Marinelli	68	US	Actor	Sideways; The Assassination of Richard Nixon	
June	23	Lea Massari	91	Italy	Actress	L'Avventura; Christ Stopped at Eboli	
June	24	Serge Fiori	73	Canada	Composer	An Imaginary Tale; Babine	
June	24	Bobby Sherman	81	US	Actor, Singer	He Is My Brother; Get Crazy	
June	24	Alvaro Vitali	75	Italy	Actor	Pierino contro tutti; Amarcord	
June	26	Monika Hansen	83	Germany	Actress	Faraway, So Close!; The Promise	
June	26	Rick Hurst	79	US	Actor	Steel Magnolias; In the Line of Fire	
June	26	Lalo Schifrin	93	Argentina	Composer	Cool Hand Luke; Dirty Harry	
June	27	Shefali Jariwala	42	India	Actress	Mujhse Shaadi Karogi; Hudugaru	
June	28	Bob Elmore	65	US	Actor, Stuntman	The Texas Chainsaw Massacre 2; Pirates of the Caribbean: The Curse of the Black Pearl	
June	29	Maureen Hingert	88	Sri Lanka	Actress	Fort Bowie; Gunmen from Laredo	
June	30	Kenneth Colley	87	UK	Actor	Star Wars; Monty Python's Life of Brian	
July	1	Florence Delay	84	France	Actress	The Trial of Joan of Arc; Écoute voir	
July	2	Gerald Harper	96	UK	Actor	A Night to Remember; The League of Gentlemen	
July	2	Julian McMahon	56	Australia	Actor	Fantastic Four; The Surfer	
July	3	Michael Madsen	67	US	Actor, Producer	Reservoir Dogs; Free Willy	
July	3	Lolit Solis	78	Philippines	Talent Manager	Lost Command; My Kontrabida Girl	
July	4	Chow Chung	92	Hong Kong	Actor	Love Undercover; Fatal Move	
July	4	Rob Houwer	87	Netherlands	Producer	Turkish Delight; Soldier of Orange	
July	4	Mark Snow	78	US	Composer	The X-Files; The New Mutants	
July	8	James Carter Cathcart	71	US	Voice Actor	Pokémon: The First Movie; Pokémon the Movie: Secrets of the Jungle	
July	9	Ioana Bulcă	89	Romania	Actress	The Mill of Good Luck; A Woman for a Season	
July	11	David Kaff	79	UK	Actor, Musician	This Is Spinal Tap; No Worries	
July	11	Rene Kirby	70	US	Actor	Shallow Hal; Stuck on You	
July	12	Rudolf van den Berg	76	Netherlands	Director, Screenwriter	Tirza; Süskind	
July	13	Kota Srinivasa Rao	83	India	Actor	Little Soldiers; Ganesh	
July	14	B. Saroja Devi	87	India	Actress	Panduranga Mahatyam; Nadodi Mannan	
July	14	Alexander Mitta	92	Russia	Director, Screenwriter	Shine, Shine, My Star; Air Crew	
July	14	Eileen Fulton	91	US	Actress	Girl of the Night; The Life Zone	
July	15	Dheeraj Kumar	80	India	Actor, Producer	Roti Kapada Aur Makaan; Sargam	
July	16	Connie Francis	87	US	Actress, Singer	Where the Boys Are; Looking for Love	
July	16	Yuri Kara	70	Russia	Director, Producer, Screenwriter	Barons of Crime; The Feasts of Belshazzar, or a Night with Stalin	
July	16	Taylor Wong	75	Hong Kong	Director	The Truth; With or Without You	
July	17	Alan Bergman	99	US	Songwriter	The Way We Were; The Thomas Crown Affair	
July	18	Homayun	88	Iran	Actor	Topoli; Soltan-e Ghalbha	
July	18	Jimmy Hunt	85	US	Actor	Cheaper by the Dozen; Invaders from Mars	
July	18	Michael Melski	56	Canada	Director, Screenwriter, Producer	Mile Zero; Charlie Zone	
July	18	Velu Prabhakaran	68	India	Actor, Cinematographer, Director	Vikadan; Pathinaaru	
July	18	Harry Standjofski	66	Canada	Actor	X-Men: Days of Future Past; The Walk	
July	18	Fish Venkat	53	India	Actor, Comedian	Aadi; Bunny	
July	18	Kenneth Washington	89	US	Actor	Changes; Westworld	
July	20	Malcolm-Jamal Warner	54	US	Actor	Drop Zone; Fool's Gold	
July	20	Tom Troupe	97	US	Actor	Kelly's Heroes; My Own Private Idaho	
July	21	Tatyana Yegorova	81	Russia	Actress	Once Upon a Time Twenty Years Later; Armavir	
July	21	Dan Ziskie	80	US	Actor	Adventures in Babysitting; Troop Beverly Hills	
July	22	Tsunehiko Kamijō	85	Japan	Actor, Singer, Voice Actor	Princess Mononoke; Spirited Away	
July	22	Chuck Mangione	84	US	Composer	The Children of Sanchez; The Cannonball Run	
July	22	Ozzy Osbourne	76	UK	Actor, Singer	Trick or Treat; Little Nicky	
July	23	Ron Silverman	92	US	Actor, Producer	Brubaker; Krull	
July	23	Tony Peers	78	UK	Actor	Funny Bones; L.A. Without a Map	
July	23	Henri Szeps	81	Australia	Actor	Les Patterson Saves the World; Travelling North	
July	23	Alfie Wise	81	US	Actor	Hooper; Smokey and the Bandit	
July	24	Hulk Hogan	71	US	Actor	Rocky III; No Holds Barred	
July	24	Jules Walter	96	Antigua	Actor	Return of the Jedi; A View to a Kill	
July	24	Don Zimmerman	81	US	Film Editor	Coming Home; Liar Liar	
July	26	Jiří Krampol	87	Czech Republic	Actor	Operation Daybreak; Forbidden Dreams	
July	29	Alon Abutbul	60	Israel	Actor	The Dark Knight Rises; Lansky	
July	30	David Argue	65	Australia	Actor	Razorback; Hercules Returns	
July	30	Lotfy Labib	77	Egypt	Actor	Baba; Mawlana	
July	31	Adriana Asti	94	Italy	Actress	Before the Revolution; The Best of Youth	
August	1	Frank Grimes	78	Ireland	Actor	A Bridge Too Far; The Whales of August	
August	1	Jonathan Kaplan	77	US	Director	The Accused; Love Field	
August	2	Norman Eshley	80	UK	Actor	The Lost Continent; See No Evil	
August	2	Madhan Bob	71	India	Actor	Magalir Mattum; Vasco Da Gama	
August	2	Kelley Mack	33	US	Actress	Profile; Broadcast Signal Intrusion	
August	3	Loni Anderson	79	US	Actress	Stroker Ace; A Night at the Roxbury	
August	4	Eldar Shengelaia	92	Georgia	Director, Screenwriter	The White Caravan; Blue Mountains	
August	4	Song Young-gyu	55	South Korea	Actor	Pandora; Extreme Job	
August	5	Santhosh Balaraj	38	India	Actor	Kempa; Olavina Ole	
August	5	Stanley McGeagh	88	UK	Actor	The Land That Time Forgot; Gandhi	
August	9	Ray Brooks	86	UK	Actor	The Knack ...and How to Get It; Carry On Abroad	
August	9	Ivan Krasko	94	Russia	Actor	Mister Designer; Little Longnose	
August	10	David Ketchum	97	US	Actor	Young Doctors in Love; The Other Sister	
August	11	Nazima	77	India	Actress	Be-Imaan; Manchali	
August	12	Ronnie Rondell Jr.	88	US	Actor, Stuntman	How the West Was Won; Ice Station Zebra	
August	13	Jacques Martial	70	France	Actor	Noir et Blanc; Belphegor, Phantom of the Louvre	
August	14	Ingeborg Elzevier	89	Netherlands	Actress	The Little Blonde Death; The Dress	
August	15	Tristan Rogers	79	Australia	Actor	The Flesh and Blood Show; The Rescuers Down Under	
August	16	Dan Tana	90	Serbia	Actor	Special Treatment; Twilight Time	
August	17	Joe Caroff	103	US	Title Designer, Poster Artist	West Side Story; The Last Temptation of Christ	
August	17	Elon Dershowitz	64	US	Producer	Reversal of Fortune; The Whole Truth	
August	17	Terence Stamp	87	UK	Actor	Billy Budd; Superman	
August	18	Achyut Potdar	90	India	Actor	Dev; 3 Idiots	
August	19	Michel Fessler	70	France	Director, Screenwriter	March of the Penguins; Farinelli	
August	19	Eduardo Serra	81	Portugal	Cinematographer	Unbreakable; Harry Potter	
August	20	Tatsuya Nagamine	53	Japan	Director	One Piece Film: Z; Dragon Ball Super: Broly	
August	22	Jaswinder Bhalla	65	India	Actor, Comedian	Carry On Jatta; Power Cut	
August	23	Jerry Adler	96	US	Actor	The Public Eye; Manhattan Murder Mystery	
August	23	Per Holst	86	Denmark	Director, Producer	Pelle the Conqueror; All Things Fair	
August	23	Miguel Ángel Martínez	70	Dominican Republic	Actor	La soga; Trópico de sangre	
August	23	Joel Sill	78	US	Music Supervisor	Flashdance; Forrest Gump	
August	24	John Barnett	80	New Zealand	Producer	Whale Rider; Sione's Wedding	
August	24	Verónica Echegui	42	Spain	Actress	My Name Is Juani; My Prison Yard	
August	24	Richard Hobert	73	Sweden	Director	Everybody Loves Alice; Spring of Joy	
August	24	Luis Alberto Lamata	65	Venezuela	Director, Producer	Jericho; Desnudo con Naranjas	
August	24	Floyd Levine	93	US	Actor	Dog Day Afternoon; Night Shift	
August	25	Isabel Pisano	77	Uruguay	Actress	Savage Pampas; Heartbreak Tango	
August	25	Frank Price	95	US	Producer, Executive	Gladiator; Zeus and Roxanne	
August	26	Edward Faulkner	93	US	Actor	Hellfighters; The Green Berets	
August	27	Jacques Dorfmann	79	France	Director, Producer, Screenwriter	Shadow of the Wolf; Druids	
August	27	Takaya Hashi	72	Japan	Voice Actor	Metropolis; Appleseed Ex Machina	
August	27	Eusebio Poncela	79	Spain	Actor	Arrebato; Martín (Hache)	
August	28	Randy Boone	83	US	Actor	Terminal Island; The Wild Pair	
August	28	Mike de Leon	78	Philippines	Director, Producer, Screenwriter	Manila in the Claws of Light; Kisapmata	
August	28	Rami Heuberger	61	Israel	Actor, Director	Schindler's List; Golda	
August	29	Rodion Shchedrin	92	Russia	Composer	The Height; Anna Karenina	
August	30	Arthur Brauss	89	Germany	Actor	Cross of Iron; The Girl from Hong Kong	
August	30	Trax Colton	96	US	Actor	The Marriage-Go-Round; It Happened in Athens	
August	31	Priya Marathe	38	India	Actress	Humne Jeena Seekh Liya; Ti Ani Itar	
September	1	Dhimitër Anagnosti	89	Albania	Director	The Return of the Dead Army; Përralle Nga e Kaluara	
September	1	Joe Bugner	75	UK	Actor	I'm for the Hippopotamus; Street Fighter	
September	1	Graham Greene	73	Canada	Actor	Dances With Wolves; Wind River	
September	1	Scott Spiegel	67	US	Actor, Producer, Screenwriter	Evil Dead II; Hostel	
September	2	Morten Arnfred	80	Denmark	Director, Screenwriter	Der er et yndigt land; The Russian Singer	
September	2	Jean-Pierre Bouyxou	79	France	Actor, Director	Les raisins de la mort; La Morte Vivante	
September	2	Kazuko Yoshiyuki	90	Japan	Actress	Kikujiro; Departures	
September	3	Jacques Charrier	88	France	Actor, Producer	Babette Goes to War; Tiro al piccione	
September	3	Keith Hodiak	75	UK	Actor	Revenge of the Pink Panther; An American Werewolf in London	
September	4	Ted Mann	72	Canada	Producer, Screenwriter	O.C. and Stiggs; Space Truckers	
September	4	Neil Summers	81	US	Actor, Stuntman	Dick Tracy; RoboCop	
September	4	Pia Velsi	101	Italy	Actress	Parenti serpenti; ...And the Wild Wild Women	
September	5	Derry Power	90	Ireland	Actor	Underground; Far and Away	
September	5	Mark Volman	78	US	Actor, Composer	200 Motels; Down and Dirty Duck	
September	7	Stuart Craig	83	UK	Production Designer	Gandhi; Harry Potter	
September	8	Salli Sachse	82	US	Actress	The Trip; Wild in the Streets	
September	9	Polly Holliday	88	US	Actress	Gremlins; Mrs. Doubtfire	
September	10	Nicky Ryan	79	Ireland	Composer, Lyricist	The Lord of the Rings: The Fellowship of the Ring; Far and Away	
September	10	Paula Shaw	84	US	Actress	Insomnia; Freddy vs. Jason	
September	13	Murad Yagizarov	86	Azerbaijan	Actor	The Stepmother; Babek	
September	14	Pat Crowley	91	US	Actress	Forever Female; Red Garters	
September	14	Gianni Quaranta	82	Italy	Production Designer	A Room with a View; La Traviata	
September	15	Ron Friedman	93	US	Producer, Screenwriter	Record City; The Transformers: The Movie	
September	15	Marilyn Knowlden	99	US	Actress	Imitation of Life; Angels With Dirty Faces	
September	16	Robert Redford	89	US	Actor, Director, Producer	Butch Cassidy and the Sundance Kid; Ordinary People	
September	17	Allie Light	90	US	Director, Producer, Film Editor	In the Shadow of the Stars; Dialogues with Madwomen	
September	17	Sergio Salvati	91	Italy	Cinematographer	The Beyond; Zombi 2	
September	18	Robo Shankar	46	India	Actor, Comedian, Producer	Padayappa; Deepavali	
September	19	Zubeen Garg	52	India	Actor, Director, Singer	Tumi Mor Matho Mor; Mon Jaai	
September	20	James Mitchum	84	US	Actor	Thunder Road; Moonrunners	
September	20	Aryeh Moskona	78	Israel	Actor, Singer	Diamonds; Operation Thunderbolt	
September	22	Henry Jaglom	87	US	Actor, Director, Screenwriter	Tracks; Déjà Vu	
September	22	Lee Weaver	95	US	Actor	Heaven Can Wait; O Brother, Where Art Thou?	
September	23	Claudia Cardinale	87	Italy	Actress	The Pink Panther; Once Upon a Time in the West	
September	23	Hernán Romero	83	Peru	Actor	The Green Wall; Fallen from Heaven	
September	23	Nalin Pradeep Udawela	56	Sri Lanka	Actor	Joyful Journeys; Parawarthana	
September	26	Michèle Burke	75	Ireland	Makeup Artist	Bram Stoker's Dracula; Interview with the Vampire	
September	26	Tigran Keosayan	59	Russia	Actor, Director	The President and His Granddaughter; Heat	
September	26	Ann Robinson	96	US	Actress	The War of the Worlds; Imitation of Life	
September	26	Esa Saario	93	Finland	Actor	Akseli and Elina; Farewell, Mr. President	
September	29	Adriana Aizemberg	86	Argentina	Actress	The ABC of Love; Lost Embrace	
September	29	Jørgen Leth	88	Denmark	Director	The Perfect Human; A Sunday in Hell	
September	29	Patrick Murray	68	UK	Actor	Scum; Quadrophenia	
September	30	Renato Casaro	89	Italy	Poster Artist	Flash Gordon; Conan the Barbarian	
October	1	José Andrada	87	Argentina	Actor	Johny Tolengo, el majestuoso; Two to Tango	
October	1	Jerry Leggio	90	US	Actor	Sounder; Sister, Sister	
October	1	Judit Elek	87	Hungary	Director, Screenwriter	Maria's Day; Memories of a River	
October	2	Ed Williams	98	US	Actor, Comedian	The Naked Gun; Father of the Bride	
October	3	Remo Girone	76	Italy	Actor	Ford v Ferrari; The Equalizer 3	
October	3	Kimberly Hébert Gregory	52	US	Actress	I Think I Love My Wife; Red Hook Summer	
October	3	Patricia Routledge	96	UK	Actress	To Sir, with Love; Don't Raise the Bridge, Lower the River	
October	4	Xavier Durringer	61	France	Director, Screenwriter	The Conquest; Paradise Beach	
October	5	Ron Dean	87	US	Actor	The Fugitive; The Dark Knight	
October	5	Ken Jacobs	92	US	Director	Tom, Tom, The Piper's Son; Star Spangled to Death	
October	5	Lotte Ledl	95	Austria	Actress	A Song Goes Round the World; Heidi	
October	5	Jerry Tokofsky	91	US	Producer	Where's Poppa?; Glengarry Glen Ross	
October	6	Wanda Perdelwitz	41	Germany	Actress	CQ; Muxmäuschenstill	
October	6	John Woodvine	96	UK	Actor	Young Winston; An American Werewolf in London	
October	7	Ian Freebairn-Smith	93	US	Arranger, Composer	A Star Is Born; The End	
October	7	Yen Cheng-kuo	50	Taiwan	Actor	A Summer at Grandpa's; Dust of Angels	
October	8	Paolo Bonacelli	88	Italy	Actor	Midnight Express; Salò, or the 120 Days of Sodom	
October	10	Ted Hartley	100	US	Actor, Producer	High Plains Drifter; Mighty Joe Young	
October	11	Mohamad Kasebi	74	Iran	Actor	Saint Mary; Without Permission	
October	11	Diane Keaton	79	US	Actress	The Godfather; Annie Hall	
October	12	Jackie Burch	74	US	Casting Director	The Breakfast Club; Die Hard	
October	13	Tony Caunter	88	UK	Actor	The Hill; A Twist of Sand	
October	13	Anna Kyriakou	96	Greece	Actress	Liar Wanted; Zorba the Greek	
October	13	Myron Lapka	69	US	Actor, Stuntman	Action Jackson; Universal Soldier	
October	13	Drew Struzan	78	US	Poster Artist	Star Wars; Indiana Jones	
October	14	Nasser Taghvai	84	Iran	Director	Captain Khorshid; Unruled Paper	
October	14	Penelope Milford	77	US	Actress	Coming Home; Endless Love	
October	15	Pankaj Dheer	68	India	Actor	Gippi; Jeevan Ek Sanghursh	
October	15	Samantha Eggar	86	UK	Actress	The Collector; Doctor Dolittle	
October	16	Klaus Doldinger	89	Germany	Composer	Das Boot; The NeverEnding Story	
October	16	Arif Erkin Güzelbeyoğlu	90	Turkey	Actor	Beyaz Melek; Çoban Yıldızı	
October	18	Martine Brochard	81	France	Actress	Eyeball; Paprika	
October	18	Nabil Shaban	72	UK	Actor	City of Joy; Children of Men	
October	20	Asrani	84	India	Actor, Comedian	Mere Apne; Sholay	
October	20	Michael DeLano	84	US	Actor	Commando; Ocean's	
October	23	June Lockhart	100	US	Actress	Meet Me in St. Louis; Son of Lassie	
October	24	Steven W. Carabatsos	87	US	Screenwriter, Story Editor	The Last Flight of Noah's Ark; Hot Pursuit	
October	24	Paul Hüttel	90	Denmark	Actor	Ballad of Carl-Henning; Amour	
October	25	Tony Adams	84	UK	Actor	Hardly Working; Aladdin	
October	25	Björn Andrésen	70	Sweden	Actor	Death in Venice; Midsommar	
October	25	Mauro Di Francesco	74	Italy	Actor	Attila flagello di Dio; Chewingum	
October	25	Miriam Learra	88	Cuba	Actress	The Galíndez File; 7 Days in Havana	
October	25	Franco Mari	83	Italy	Actor, Comedian	Italiano medio; Omicidio all'italiana	
October	25	Satish Shah	74	India	Actor	Jaane Bhi Do Yaaro; Kal Ho Naa Ho	
October	26	Gennady Nazarov	58	Russia	Actor	Life and Extraordinary Adventures of Private Ivan Chonkin; What a Wonderful Game	
October	27	Prunella Scales	93	UK	Actress	The Lonely Passion of Judith Hearne; Howards End	
October	28	Benz Hui	76	Hong Kong	Actor	Running Out of Time; Breaking News	
October	28	Ilona Kassai	97	Hungary	Actress	The Round Up; Tinker Tailor Soldier Spy	
October	28	Héctor Noguera	88	Chile	Actor	Jackal of Nahueltoro; The Frontier	
October	29	Maria Riva	100	Germany	Actress	The Scarlet Empress; Scrooged	
October	30	Yoqub Ahmedov	87	Uzbekistan	Actor	Adventures of Ali-Baba and the Forty Thieves; The Battle of the Three Kings	
October	30	Adam Greenberg	88	Israel	Cinematographer	Terminator; Ghost	
October	30	Jorunn Kjellsby	81	Norway	Actress	Get Ready to Be Boyzvoiced; A Somewhat Gentle Man	
October	30	Peter Watkins	90	UK	Documentarian	The War Game; Punishment Park	
October	31	Stanley Fung	81	Hong Kong	Actor, Comedian	My Lucky Stars; Dragons Forever	
October	31	Tchéky Karyo	72	France	Actor	La Femme Nikita; Bad Boys	
November	2	Betty Harford	98	US	Actress	The Wild and the Innocent; Inside Daisy Clover	
November	2	Walter Maslow	97	US	Actor	Suicide Battalion; The Cosmic Man	
November	2	Jim Self	82	US	Composer	Close Encounters of the Third Kind; Home Alone	
November	3	Diane Ladd	89	US	Actress	Alice Doesn't Live Here Anymore; Wild at Heart	
November	4	Elizabeth Franz	84	US	Actress	The Secret of My Success; Sabrina	
November	4	Elina Salo	89	Finland	Actress	Hamlet Goes Business; Le Havre	
November	5	Pauline Collins	85	UK	Actress	Shirley Valentine; Albert Nobbs	
November	6	Manuel Pérez	85	Cuba	Director	The Man from Maisinicu; Río Negro	
November	7	Lee Tamahori	75	New Zealand	Director	Once Were Warriors; Die Another Day	
November	8	Mary Cybulski	70	US	Script Supervisor, Still Photographer	Eternal Sunshine of the Spotless Mind; Life of Pi	
November	8	Tatsuya Nakadai	92	Japan	Actor	The Human Condition; Ran	
November	9	John Laws	90	Australia	Actor	Ned Kelly; Nickel Queen	
November	10	Jonathan Pienaar	63	South Africa	Actor	Blood Diamond; Black Venus	
November	11	Homayoun Ershadi	78	Iran	Actor	Taste of Cherry; The Kite Runner	
November	11	Sally Kirkland	84	US	Actress, Producer	Anna; JFK	
November	14	Hark Bohm	86	Germany	Actor	The Marriage of Maria Braun; Lola	
November	14	Kamini Kaushal	98	India	Actress	Neecha Nagar; Biraj Bahu	
November	14	V. Sekhar	73	India	Director	Viralukketha Veekkam; Hendtheer Darbar	
November	15	Rosa Rosal	97	Philippines	Actress	Badjao: The Sea Gypsies; Blessings of the Land	
November	17	Julio Fernández	78	Spain	Producer, Distributor	The Nameless; The Machinist	
November	17	Alice Kessler	89	Germany	Actress, Singer	Erik the Conqueror; Dead Woman from Beverly Hills	
November	17	Ellen Kessler	89	Germany	Actress, Singer	As Long as There Are Pretty Girls; The Thursday	
November	18	Spencer Lofranco	33	Canada	Actor	Unbroken; Gotti	
November	19	Carl Ciarfalio	72	US	Actor, Stuntman	Fight Club; The Amazing Spider-Man	
November	20	Branko Ivanda	83	Croatia	Director	Gravitation; A Crime in a School	
November	23	Udo Kier	81	Germany	Actor	Blade; Melancholia	
November	24	Jimmy Cliff	81	Jamaica	Actor, Composer, Singer	The Harder They Come; Club Paradise	
November	24	Dharmendra	89	India	Actor	Ayee Milan Ki Bela; Phool Aur Patthar	
November	24	Jill Freud	98	UK	Actress	The Woman in the Hall; Love Actually	
November	24	Jack Shepherd	85	UK	Actor	Wonderland; The Golden Compass	
November	25	Biyouna	73	Algeria	Actress, Singer	Holiday; The Source	
November	25	Lee Soon-jae	91	South Korea	Actor	Yongary, Monster from the Deep; Good Morning President	
November	28	Ingrid van Bergen	94	Germany	Actress	Roses for the Prosecutor; Town Without Pity	
November	28	Lise Bourdin	99	France	Actress	The River Girl; Love in the Afternoon	
November	29	Toni Lamond	93	Australia	Actress, Singer	Spotswood; Razzle Dazzle: A Journey into Dance	
November	29	Tomomichi Nishimura	79	Japan	Voice Actor	Castle in the Sky; My Neighbor Totoro	
November	29	Tom Stoppard	88	UK	Director, Screenwriter	Brazil; Shakespeare in Love	
December	2	David Matalon	82	US	Producer	What's Eating Gilbert Grape; Color of Night	
December	2	Lesley Walker	80	UK	Film Editor	Fear and Loathing in Las Vegas; Mamma Mia!	
December	2	José Luis Cienfuegos	60	Spain	Festival Programmer	—N/a	
December	3	Steve Cropper	84	US	Actor, Guitarist, Songwriter	The Blues Brothers; Satisfaction	
December	3	Theodor Pištěk	93	Czech Republic	Costume Designer	Amadeus; Valmont	
December	4	M. Saravanan	85	India	Producer	Sivaji: The Boss; Ayan	
December	4	Cary-Hiroyuki Tagawa	75	US	Actor	The Last Emperor; Mortal Kombat	
December	6	Christian de Chalonge	88	France	Director, Screenwriter	The Wedding Ring; L'Argent des autres	
December	6	Viacheslav Kryshtofovych	78	Ukraine	Director	Adam's Rib; A Friend of the Deceased	
December	7	Rachael Carpani	45	Australia	Actress	Triangle; The Way Back	
December	8	Eila Roine	94	Finland	Actress	The Big Freeze; 21 tapaa pilata avioliitto	
December	8	Yun Il-bong	91	South Korea	Actor	Oyster Village; Suddenly at Midnight	
December	9	Kim Ji-mee	85	South Korea	Actress	The Land; Gilsotteum	
December	9	Béatrice Picard	96	Canada	Actress	My Aunt Aline; Marguerite	
December	9	Jeff Wexler	78	US	Sound Mixer	Fight Club; The Last Samurai	
December	10	Jeffrey Garcia	50	US	Actor	Jimmy Neutron: Boy Genius; Happy Feet	
December	10	Jim Ward	66	US	Voice Actor	Spirited Away; Ratchet & Clank	
December	11	Stanley Baxter	99	UK	Actor	Very Important Person; Crooks Anonymous	
December	11	May Britt	91	Sweden	Actress	War and Peace; The Young Lions	
December	11	Susana Rossberg	80	Belgium	Film Editor, Script Supervisor	Toto the Hero; The Eighth Day	
December	12	Arthur Cohn	98	Switzerland	Producer	Black and White in Color; The Garden of the Finzi-Continis	
December	12	Susie Figgis	77	UK	Casting Director	Harry Potter and the Philosopher's Stone; Sweeney Todd: The Demon Barber of Fleet Street	
December	12	Peter Greene	60	US	Actor	Pulp Fiction; The Mask	
December	13	Héctor Alterio	96	Argentina	Actor	The Official Story; Son of the Bride	
December	14	Anthony Geary	78	US	Actor	Johnny Got His Gun; UHF	
December	14	Michele Singer Reiner	70	US	Producer	Shock and Awe; Albert Brooks: Defending My Life	
December	14	Rob Reiner	78	US	Director, Actor, Producer	This Is Spinal Tap; The Princess Bride	
December	16	Gil Gerard	82	US	Actor	Airport '77; Buck Rogers in the 25th Century	
December	18	Richard Dimitri	83	US	Actor, Comedian	Johnny Dangerously; Let It Ride	
December	18	Helen Siff	88	US	Actress	The Karate Kid; Hail, Caesar!	
December	19	James Ransone	46	US	Actor	Sinister; It Chapter Two	
December	20	Celso Bugallo	78	Spain	Actor	The Sea Inside; The Good Boss	
December	20	Anatoly Lobotsky	66	Russia	Actor	The Envy of Gods; AK-47	
December	20	Sreenivasan	75	India	Actor, Screenwriter, Director	Vadakkunokkiyantram; Chinthavishtayaya Shyamala	
December	21	Loren Carpenter	78	US	Animator	Toy Story; A Bug's Life	
December	22	Pat Finn	60	US	Actor	Dude, Where's My Car?; It's Complicated	
December	24	Mohammad Bakri	72	Palestine	Actor, Director	Beyond the Walls; Haifa	
December	25	Vera Alentova	83	Russia	Actress	Moscow Does Not Believe in Tears; Shirli-myrli	
December	25	Amos Poe	76	US	Director, Producer, Screenwriter	The Blank Generation; Rocket Gibraltar	
December	25	Peter Sattmann	77	Germany	Actor	Fool's Mate; Making Up!	
December	26	Bahram Beyzai	87	Iran	Director, Screenwriter, Film Editor	Death of Yazdgerd; Bashu, the Little Stranger	
December	27	Marcia Rodd	87	US	Actress, Singer	Little Murders; Handle with Care	
December	27	Daoud Abdel Sayed	79	Egypt	Director, Screenwriter	The Kit Kat; Messages from the Sea	
December	28	Brigitte Bardot	91	France	Actress	And God Created Woman; Contempt	
December	28	Pablo Moret	92	Argentina	Actor	The Bitter Stems; Una Jaula no tiene secretos	
December	30	Isiah Whitlock Jr.	71	US	Actor	25th Hour; Cedar Rapids	
December	31	Jon Korkes	80	US	Actor	Catch-22; Little Murders	
December	31	Candy Raymond	75	Australia	Actress	Freedom; Monkey Grip	

== Film debuts ==
- Aidan Delbis – Bugonia
- Hugo Welzel – Enemies
- Matty Matheson – Gabby's Dollhouse: The Movie
- Ice Spice – Highest 2 Lowest
- Angel Reese – A House of Dynamite
- Gabby Barrett – Hurry Up Tomorrow
- Tom Francis – Jay Kelly
- Maia Kealoha – Lilo & Stitch
- Nadia Melliti – The Little Sister
- Kevin O'Leary – Marty Supreme
- Tyler, the Creator – Marty Supreme
- Luke Manley - Marty Supreme
- Louisa Jacobson – Materialists
- Melani García – The Mortimers
- Kenji Fan – My First of May
- Chase Infiniti – One Battle After Another
- SZA – One of Them Days
- Isaiah Hill – One Spoon of Chocolate
- Charity Kase – Peter Pan's Neverland Nightmare
- Miles Caton – Sinners
- Dujonna Gift – Snow White
- George Salazar – Snow White
- E. R. Fightmaster – Sorry, Baby
- Cary Christopher - Weapons
- The Weeknd - Hurry Up Tomorrow
