= Revier =

Revier may refer to:

- "Revier", a common nickname for the Ruhr region
- Revier (Nazi concentration camps), the alleged medical facility for inmates in Nazi concentration camps
- the former German name of the village of Rejowiec, in the administrative district of Gmina Skoki, within Wągrowiec County, Greater Poland Voivodeship, Poland

== People ==
- Abraham de Revier Sr., the first elder of the Old Dutch Church of Sleepy Hollow in Sleepy Hollow, New York
- Harry Revier (1890 – 1957), an independent American filmmaker
- Dorothy Revier (1904 – 1993), an American actress

== See also ==
- Reviers, a commune in France
- Revir
