= Peter Saraf =

American film producer

Peter Saraf is a film, television and theatre producer. He is the son of film producer Irving Saraf. His producer credits include Little Miss Sunshine, A Beautiful Day in the Neighborhood, and Loving (2016 film). He began his career producing with director Jonathan Demme on movies such as Philadelphia (film), Beloved (1998 film), Adaptation (film), Ulee’s Gold, and the Oscar nominated documentary, Mandela: Son of Africa, Father of a Nation. He co-founded and co-ran Big Beach (company) with Marc Turtletaub, which he co-ran with Turtletaub for two decades until he exited "quietly" in 2020 after Big Beach moved its headquarters from New York and laid off a number of Saraf's staff. He has been nominated for Oscar, Golden Globe and Tony Awards and won multiple awards including the Spirit, Gotham, and Producers Guild Awards. He was the chair of the PGA East, a Vice President of the PGA, and currently sits on the executive committee of the Producers Branch of the Academy.

== Filmography ==
=== Film ===
Year	Film	Credit	Award
1996	Into the Rope		
1997	Ulee's Gold	Co-producer	Nominated–Independent Spirit Award for Best Film
1999	The Opportunists	Executive producer	
2002	The Truth About Charlie	Produced By	
2002	Adaptation	Executive producer	
2005	Everything Is Illuminated	Produced By	
2006	Little Miss Sunshine	Produced By	Independent Spirit Award for Best Film; Producers Guild Award for Best Theatrical Motion Picture; Nominated–Academy Award for Best Picture
2007	Chop Shop	Executive producer	
2008	Sunshine Cleaning	Produced By	
2008	Is Anybody There?	Produced By	
2009	Away We Go	Produced By	
2010	Jack Goes Boating	Produced By	
2011	Our Idiot Brother	Produced By	
2012	Safety Not Guaranteed	Produced By	Nominated–Independent Spirit Award for Best Feature
2013	The Kings of Summer	Produced By	
2013	Gods Behaving Badly	Produced By	
2015	Me Him Her	Produced By	
2015	3 Generations	Produced By	
2016	Loving	Produced By	Producer Guild "Stanley Kramer" Award
2018	White Fang	Produced By	
2018	Puzzle	Produced By	
2019	The Farewell	Produced By	Independent Spirit Award for Best Film; Nominated–Gotham Independent Film Award for Best Feature
2019	A Beautiful Day in the Neighborhood	Produced By	
2020	What the Constitution Means to Me	Executive producer	
2021	Land	Produced By	
2022	Don't Make Me Go	Produced By	
TBA	Intelligent Life		
TBA	Out of My Mind	Produced By	
TBA	Two Wolves		

Miscellaneous crew

Year	Film	Role
1998	Beloved	Mayor: Bluestone Road

Thanks

Year	Film	Role
2002	The Good Girl	Special thanks
2005	Duane Hopwood	Special thanks
2012	Sleepwalk with Me	The filmmakers wish to thank
2014	The Skeleton Twins	Special thanks
2014	Hollidaysburg	Special thanks
2015	People Places Things	The producers wish to thank
2016	Morris from America	Special thanks
2018	Maine	Special thanks
2018	The Amaranth	Special thanks
2020	Penguin Bloom	Very special thanks

=== Television ===
Year	Title	Credit	Awards
2018	Vida	Executive producer	
2018−19	Sorry for Your Loss	Executive producer	
2021	These Days	Executive producer	
2021	Nuclear Family	Executive producer	Nominated for Peabody Award

== Personal life ==
Saraf is the son of the late film producer and director, Irving Saraf. Irving Saraf, who was born in Poland and raised in Israel, won an Academy Award for the documentary film, In the Shadow of the Stars, in 1991. Peter graduated from Wesleyan University in 1988. He is married to Erika Greene and they have two children.
