= Funtikov =

Funtikov (Russian: Фунтиков) is a Russian surname. Notable people with the surname include:

- Fyodor Funtikov (1875/76–1926), Russian socialist revolutionary railway worker
- Vasily Funtikov (1962–2025), Soviet and Russian film and theatre actor
