= Het Notite Boeck der Christelyckes Kercke op de Manner of Philips Burgh =

Record book of the Old Dutch Church of Sleepy Hollow

Het Notite Boeck der Christelyckes kercke op de Manner of Philips Burgh (The Minute Book of the Christian Church of the Manor of Philipsburg) is a surviving record book (1715-1716) of the Old Dutch Church of Sleepy Hollow in Sleepy Hollow, New York.

Abraham de Revier (either Sr. or Jr.) evidently kept a memorandum book that is now lost to history, which was heavily drawn upon by Dirck Storm in composing the church's history, "Het Notite Boeck der Christelyckes Kercke op de Manner of Philips Burgh."

In the introduction to his book, Dirck Storm explains that he was specifically chosen by the congregation of the Old Dutch Church of Sleepy Hollow to preserve its history for future generations. According to the records and the translation by David Cole, the members of the church met on November 3, 1715, and decided that: "...the best informed and most competent member be chosen to make up a statement of events that led to the founding of the church." Storm was selected for this task because of his literacy and experience—he had previously served as a town clerk in several other Dutch settlements.

== Contents ==
Specifically, he was asked to: record the church's history retroactively (since the church was organized around 1697 but no formal record had been kept); compile a formal record of the membership, baptisms, and the specific circumstances surrounding the construction of the church and its relationship with the lord of Philipsburg Manor, Frederick Philipse, who built the church. His introduction emphasizes that this was done so that the "descendants" of the original families would have a faithful record of their spiritual heritage and the labors of those who founded the church. (Storm was not tasked with recording the members' birth or death dates, so his book does not contain these.)

The book is divided into five "books" or divisions:

- First Division: Dirck Storm's Brief History of the Philipsburg Manor's Upper Mills community
- Second Division: Members Registrar, 1697–1775
- Third Division: List of Elders and Deacons, 1697–1776, 1790
- Fourth Division: Baptisms, 1697–c. 1778, 1791
- Fifth Division: Marriages, 1697–1790

"Het Notite Boeck" is one of the most important books in early American history—chronicling Dutch Colonial community life in the English-ruled Province of New York. Dirck Storm's manuscript of "Het Notite Boeck" is in the custody of the Reformed Church of the Tarrytowns, which is the continuation of the original congregation that worshipped at the Old Dutch Church. A microform copy is preserved in the Granite Mountain Records Vault in Utah, owned by the Church of Jesus Christ of Latter-day Saints.
