= Matouš Ruml =

Czech actor

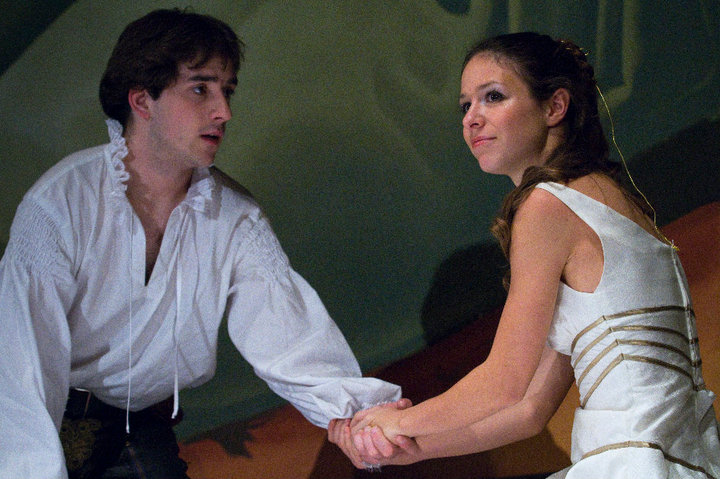
- Matouš Ruml (left) in Romeo and Juliet
- Born: 4 October 1985 (age 40); Prague, Czechoslovakia
- Education: Prague Conservatory
- Occupation: Actor
- Years active: 1994–present

Matouš Ruml (born 4 October 1985) is a Czech actor, known mainly for his role in the TV series Comeback.

== Biography ==
Ruml was born on 4 October 1985 in Prague, Czechoslovakia. He studied at Prague Conservatory, before joining the City Theatre in Mladá Boleslav on 1 August 2008.

== Theatre ==
=== City Theatre ===
- A Midsummer Night's Dream - Lysander

=== Švanda Theatre ===
- Dorotka - Marek
- Job
- Trojánky

=== Theatre of Conservatory ===
- School for Women - Horace
- Ťululum - Servants, Jára Cimrman Theatre
- Výprodej
- Hodina mezi psem a vlkem - Philip Sermoy
- As You Like It - Orlando
- Kytice - Wayfarer
- The Playboy of the Western World - Christy Mahon

=== Other theatres ===
- The Patient of Doctor Freud - Adolf Hitler, Komorní činohra
- Noc Bohů - Jester, Komorní činohra
- Equus - Alan Strang
- Mam'zelle Nitouche, ABC Theatre, Prague
- The Merry Wives of Windsor - Robin, ABC Theatre, Prague
- Arcadia, Estates Theatre, Prague
- West Side Story - Prcek, Northern Bohemian Theatre, Ústí nad Labem
- Zdravý nemocný - Notary/Tomáš, Klicpera Theatre
- Obchodník s deštěm - Bill Starbuck, A Studio Rubín

== Filmography ==
- 10 Rules (2014)
- "Ozzákova škola kalení" (2008) TV series - Lexa
- "Comeback" (2008) TV series - Lexa Bůček
- Tajemství Lesní země (2006) (TV)
- "Život na Zámku" (1994) TV series - Pavel

== Personal life ==
Ruml has an older brother. He is married to actress Tereza Rumlová, and they have a son, Nathanael.
