= Sestričky (TV series) =

Slovak medical drama television series

- Genre: Medical drama
- Based on: Syke
- Screenplay by: Biba Bohinská; Soňa Čermáková Uličná; Diana Starinsk
- Directed by: Petr Nikolaev; Braňo Mišík
- Starring: Kristína Svarinská; Aniko Vargová; Dana Košická; Kristína Madarová
- Composer: Matúš Široký
- Country of origin: Slovakia
- Original language: Slovak
- No. of seasons: 4
- No. of episodes: 42 (list of episodes)

Production
- Executive producers: Heilke Richer-Karst; Peter Kelisek
- Production locations: Bratislava, Slovakia
- Running time: 50–55 minutes

Original release
- Network: Televíza Markíza
- Release: September 4, 2018 – present

Sestričky (English: Nurses) is a Slovak medical drama television series directed by Petr Nikolaev and Braňo Mišík and premiered on Televíza Markíza on September 4, 2018 starring Kristína Svarinská, Aniko Vargová, Dana Košicka, and Kristína Madarová as ensemble roles. It is an adaptation of Finnish drama series Syke. The story tells about four colleagues hospital nurses and associated medical personnels daily routine through their career in a hospital and their personal lives.

== Synopsis ==
The four main hospital nurses, Helena, Ema, Jana and Tana experience stressful medical procedure to examine patients. The series overviews their daily activities and efforts to undergo surgical operations the patients including those with critically injured, bleeding or near-death conditions. It also imparts their romantic relationship with fellow doctors and their personal lives outside hospital scope.

== Episodes ==
As of third season, episodes designated up to ten per seasons and each season premiere in every year of September, and it broadcast every Tuesdays. However, Markíza announced the fourth would be extended to twelve episodes per week.

Season	Еpisodes	Originally aired	
Season	Еpisodes	First aired	Last aired
1	10	September 4, 2018	November 6, 2018
2	10	September 3, 2019	November 5, 2019
3	10	September 1, 2020	November 3, 2020
4	12	September 7, 2021	November 23, 2021
Christmas special		November 30, 2021	

=== List ===
==== Season 1 (2018) ====
No	Title	Premiere date
1	Episode 1	September 4, 2018
2	Episode 2	September 11, 2018
3	Episode 3	September 18, 2018
4	Episode 4	September 25, 2018
5	Episode 5	October 1, 2018
6	Episode 6	October 8, 2018
7	Episode 7	October 15, 2018
8	Episode 8	October 22, 2018
9	Episode 9	October 29, 2018
10	Episode 10	November 6, 2018

==== Season 2 (2019) ====
No	Title	Premiere date
1	Episode 1	September 3, 2019
2	Episode 2	September 10, 2019
3	Episode 3	September 17, 2019
4	Episode 4	September 24, 2019
5	Episode 5	October 1, 2019
6	Episode 6	October 8, 2019
7	Episode 7	October 15, 2019
8	Episode 8	October 22, 2019
9	Episode 9	October 29, 2019
10	Episode 10	November 5, 2019

==== Season 3 (2020) ====
No	Title	Premiere date
1	Episode 1	September 1, 2020
2	Episodes 2	September 8, 2020
3	Episode 3	September 15, 2020
4	Episode 4	September 22, 2020
5	Episode 5	September 29, 2020
6	Episode 6	October 6, 2020
7	Episode 7	October 13, 2020
8	Episode 8	October 20, 2020
9	Episode 9	October 27, 2020
10	Episode 10	November 3, 2020

==== Season 4 (2021) ====
No	Title	Premiere date
1	Episode 1	September 7, 2021
2	Episodes 2	September 14, 2021
3	Episode 3	September 21, 2021
4	Episode 4	September 28, 2021
5	Episode 5	October 5, 2021
6	Episode 6	October 12, 2021
7	Episode 7	October 19, 2021
8	Episode 8	October 26, 2021
9	Episode 9	November 2, 2021
10	Episode 10	November 9, 2021
11	Episode 11	November 16, 2021
12	Episode 12	November 23, 2021

== Cast and characters ==
- Kristina Svarinská as Ema Farkašová – a nurse and one of colleague of the nurses. Ema has a son, Tobi and estranged her husband Tibor after longtime period, who intensifies his love. While also in her career, she finds Dano, a paramedic. She is attracted by Dano while Tibor intervenes to her life.
- Dana Košicka as Helena Javorská – the head nurse of the hospital department. She suffered with anxiety disorder while her husband Viktor, entered a coma after longtime battle with stroke.
- Anikó Vargová as Táňa Šoltýsová – a nurse and colleague of the three nurses. She covets her returning to family and self-assured about her life, and caring patients.
- Kristina Madarová as Jana Sýkorová – a nurse and colleagues of the three nurses, she has two daughters and cares as maternal love. She joined the hospital department to become doctor and adjust her life. She finds Filip, a cardiologist, they accidentally fall in love.
- Juraj Loj as Tomas
- Milo Král as Filip Vágner
- Braňo Mosný as Ivan Chromík
- Matúš Kvietik as Dano
- Martin Mnahoncák as Peter Gábor
- Anna Šišková as Marta
- Helena Krajčiová as Linda
- Elena Podzámska as Ingrid Garinová

== Awards and nominations ==
Year	Award	Result
2018	OTO Award for TV Series	Nominated
