= Dirck Storm =

Early American historian

Dirck Gorisszen Storm (1630 – 1716) was an early colonial American who recorded the first official history of the Dutch community at Sleepy Hollow. His book Het Notite Boeck der Christelyckes Kercke op de Manner of Philips Burgh is a rare document of life in colonial times. Sometimes referred to as Het Notite Boeck, the five-part book is one of the few surviving records of Dutch Colonial American village life in English-occupied New York province.

== Birth and early life ==
One line of data provides that Dirck Storm was born in Utrecht, The Netherlands, in 1630 and his family resided in Leyden, Holland, where they dealt in fine cloth. R. W. Storm states that historical records carry this Storm line back to Dederick Storm, who lived in Wyck, near Delft, in 1390. The family may have been of Viking stock since so many settled in the province of North Brabant when the Vikings overran the Low Countries before the year 1000. A move from the low countries to Brabant before the year 1000 and a move to Brabant from there by Dirck in the 1600s do not support the internal logic of the latter statement.

At the age of eighteen, Dirck Storm went to Den Bosch to be a clerk in his uncle's commercial office. On May 13, 1656, he married Maria van Montfoort—daughter of Pieter van Montfoort, a Walloon Calvinist—in the church of St. Gertrude in 's-Hertogenbosch. By 1660, Storm was named Town Clerk of Oss in the Mayorate of 's-Hertogenbosch (Den Bosch). Public service was part of the Storm family history, as Dirck's father was the City Clerk of Leiden and his grandfather was a lawyer in the Court of Justice of Holland, West Friesland and Zealand. However, primary sources for all of these ancestral data are needed. When Protestant Holland was hit by a recession after the overthrow of Cromwell in England, Dirck Storm set sail for the New World.

Many sources quoted in the first line of research say that the immigrant Dirck used the patronymic middle name “Gorisz” or variations thereof, short for Goriszoon, meaning “son of Goris”, strongly suggesting his father’s first name was Goris (aka Gregorius) and not Dirk as suggested by some. Primary sources give the place of birth and marriage of one Dirck Goris Storm as Oss and give his wife's name as Maria (or the diminutive Marijke/Mariken/Maritje) Pieters (Peter's) without any reference to a surname Montfoort or alternatively van Cortenbosch. For instance, archives in the Brabants Historisch Informatie Centrum (BHIC) have a record of the marriage at Oss of Derck Goris Storm, born in Oss, Groom on Sunday 20 June 1655 to Marijke Peters, born in Oss, Bride, daughter of Peter Teunissen. No primary sources seem to use the surname "van Montfoort" for Dirck's wife. Should it be found, the church record of the marriage of Dirck Storm could provide some missing ancestral data.

A different line of research is based significantly on records from the Province of Noord Brabant, including records of the town of Oss. This line of research would welcome evidence of primary documents to show ancestry in Utrecht or Zuid Holland. In the meantime, it provides that Dirck Storm's ancestors may have instead been from the Oss area of Noord Brabant (North Brabant), The Netherlands, and that he may have been born there. The town of Oss (aka Osch) lies in the eastern part of the Province of Noord Brabant. Oss is a suburb of the city of Den Bosch, separated by hamlets such as Lith and Lithoijen.

Another BHIC record gives a Baptism on Sunday 24 Apr 1661 at Oss, father Dirck Gorisse Storm, child Peternella, mother Maria Peters. Winess 2, Derken Peter Anthonissen is daughter of Peter Anthonissen. This is consistent with a child aged 1 1/4 years when embarked on trip to America. One of three children shown on a passenger list.

The parentage of Maria Peters is arguably as found in Archival Records in Den Bosch referring to division in 1660 of an Estate at Lithoijen, apparently of the deceased parents of Dirck’s wife and her sister:

Dirck Goris STORM, husband and guardian of Marike his housewife, daughter of Peter THONISZ by Dircxken his housewife, of the one part; Marcelis Anton HUIJBERTS and Lenart Jacob LENARTS guardians of Eercke (), dependent daughter of Peter THONISZ by Dircxken beforementioned of the other part, will make division to heirs of the goods of their late parents, at Lithoijen.

Thonis, also spelled Theunis, is a common Dutch first name, short for Antonis (cognate of the English name Anthony). "Thonisz." is an abbreviation of Thoniszoon, which, like "Anthonissen", means “son of (An)Thonis”. Maria Peters or Marike Peter Thonisse would in translation be Maria, daughter of Peter, son of Anthony.

Other records in North Brabant show lands owned or leased in the Lithoyen area by various Dirck Storms, possibly ancestors, as early as 1392. The following sale may well relate to our subject Dirck, recorded in Oss a few years before Dirck Storm's travel to North America: Derrick Goress Storm, as husband of Maryken, sold land on 1 May 1656 to Jan Theunisz living at Heesch, 1 ½ morgen land, situated at Lithoyenbroeck, at a place called Parsyck. Other transfers occurred as late as 1660 and 1661, found in the same archive using variable spelling versions of Dirck Goris Storm. These are consistent with preparations for emigration.

== New Amsterdam ==
In the fall of 1662, Storm emigrated, his wife Maria, and their three children (ages six, four and one) from the Mayory of Den Bosch to New Amsterdam in New Netherland aboard De Vos (The Fox). De Vos sailed from Amsterdam after 31 August 1662 and arrived New Amsterdam 14 November 1662 with a total of 54 emigrants. During the voyage, Maria gave birth to a daughter. The ship landed at the foot of Wall Street, in what is now Manhattan.

== Town clerk and farmer ==
Storm held real estate, owned a tavern on Beaver Street, and dabbled in inn-keeping. Later he was appointed Town Clerk in several communities in Breuckelen (today's Brooklyn); New Utrecht, Bedford, and Flatbush. Many land titles and hundreds of genealogies are based on the community records he kept. He also served as a teacher in some of these communities. He farmed land in Bedford and New Lots, and served as precantor to two of the Dutch churches in Breuckelen. In 1670, he was appointed Secretary of the Colony.

== Philipsburg Manor ==
In 1691, Storm was sent to Tappan by the British, who were setting up new governments at the time. There, he became the first Secretary and Clerk of Session for Orange County, New York. He was also the voorleser of the Tappan Church. In 1693, he joined his old friend Frederick Philipse and acted as tax collector for the vast Philipsburg Manor, which was held by Philipse. Storm and his wife were recorded as members of the Old Dutch Church at Sleepy Hollow as early as 1697, soon after the church was constructed. For the latter part of his life, he lived on the lands of the Philipsburg Manor, specifically in the area known as the Upper Mills, which surrounded Philipsburg Manor House.

== Writer ==
On November 3, 1715, the church members selected Storm to begin recording the history of the church retroactively from 1697. Historic records show that they decided that Storm was "the best informed and most competent member be chosen to make up a statement of events that led to the founding of the church." Abraham de Revier, Sr., the first elder of the church (or his son of the same name) evidently kept a private memorandum book, now lost to history, which was drawn upon by Storm in composing his record. Storm's Het Notite Boeck is one of the most important books in early American history—chronicling Dutch Colonial community life in the English-ruled Province of New York.

== Descendants ==
Storm was of the yeoman class and, under Dutch law, was allowed to buy his farmland in Sleepy Hollow outright from the lord of the manor, his friend Frederick Philipse. All of his sons were farmers, but many of his descendants became captains of their own boats on the Hudson River.

Descendant Capt. Jacob Storm (1801–1883) was a prominent boat captain and merchant in the Hudson River trade. He was one of the successive owners of Philipsburg Manor House and surrounding property (after it was confiscated from the Loyalist Philipse family during the American Revolution, it was purchased in 1785 by Gerard G. Beekman Jr., and Storm bought it from Beekman's descendants in 1860). He also owned a large estate, called Mount Hope, in what is now the central area of Tarrytown. With Washington Irving, he cofounded the historic Sleepy Hollow Cemetery, where both of them are buried.

== Death ==
In May or June 1716, Storm died at Tarrytown, New York. He is buried at the Old Dutch Church Burying Ground in Sleepy Hollow, New York.

Dirck Storm is the ancestor of many notable Americans, including the famous clergyman David Gregory Storm, deacon and elder of the Old Dutch Church of Sleepy Hollow. Many Americans with the last name "Storm" or "Storms" can trace their ancestry to him.
