= In Silence (film) =

2014 film

- Film poster
- Slovak: V tichu
- Directed by: Zdeněk Jiráský
- Written by: Zdeněk Jiráský
- Produced by: Lívia Filusová
- Starring: Judit Bárdos; Jan Čtvrtník; Ján Gallovič; Valéria Stašková; Dana Košická; Kristína Svarinská; Kateřina Jandačková; Ema Dobešová
- Cinematography: Michal Černý
- Edited by: Hedvika Hansalová
- Music by: Martin Hasák
- Release dates: 18 September 2014 (Slovakia); 15 October 2014 (Czech Republic)
- Running time: 84 minutes
- Countries: Czech Republic; Slovakia

In Silence (Slovak: V tichu) is a 2014 Czech-Slovak biographical film written and directed by Zdeněk Jiráský. The film, which deals with the issue of Jewish musicians in the 1930s, was partially funded on Kickstarter. It received a nomination for the Czech Lion Award for Best Film Poster at the 2014 ceremony, but the award went to Fair Play.

== Cast ==
- Judit Bárdos as Edith Kraus
- Jan Čtvrtník as Karol Elbert
- Ján Gallovič as Arthur Chitz
- Valéria Stašková as Alice Flachová
- Dana Košická
- Kristína Svarinská as Eliška
- Kateřina Jandačková
- Ema Dobešová
