= 10 Rules =

- Theatrical release poster
- Czech: 10 pravidel jak sbalit holku
- Directed by: Karel Janák
- Written by: Karel Janák; Cristiano Bortone; Fausto Brizzi
- Starring: Miroslav Donutil
- Music by: Miroslav Chyška
- Release date: 20 March 2014
- Running time: 100 minutes
- Country: Czech Republic
- Language: Czech

10 Rules (Czech: 10 pravidel jak sbalit holku) is a 2014 romantic comedy film written and directed by Karel Janák and starring Miroslav Donutil, Matouš Ruml and Kristína Svarinská.

== Plot ==
With his most recent relationship having ended on Marek's (Matouš Ruml) anniversary, flatmate Marie (Tereza Nvotová) enlists the help of Marek's father (Miroslav Donutil) to teach his son the 10 rules of how to pick up a girl. Identifying the target as Stephanie (Kristína Svarinská), Marek's father, Marie plus other flatmates Erik (Jan Dolanský) and Pavel (Petr Buchta) set into motion a plan to allow Marek to win the heart of Stephanie. Frustrating the plans, however, is love rival Filip (Jakub Prachař), who seems to have a system of his own.

== Cast ==
- Miroslav Donutil as Marek's father
- Matouš Ruml as Marek
- Jakub Prachař as Filip
- Kristína Svarinská as Stephanie
- Jan Dolanský as Erik
- Tereza Nvotová as Marie
- Petr Buchta as Pavel
- Anna Šišková as Stephanie's mother

== See also ==
- List of Czech films of the 2010s
