= Kristína Svarinská =

Slovak actress (born 1989)

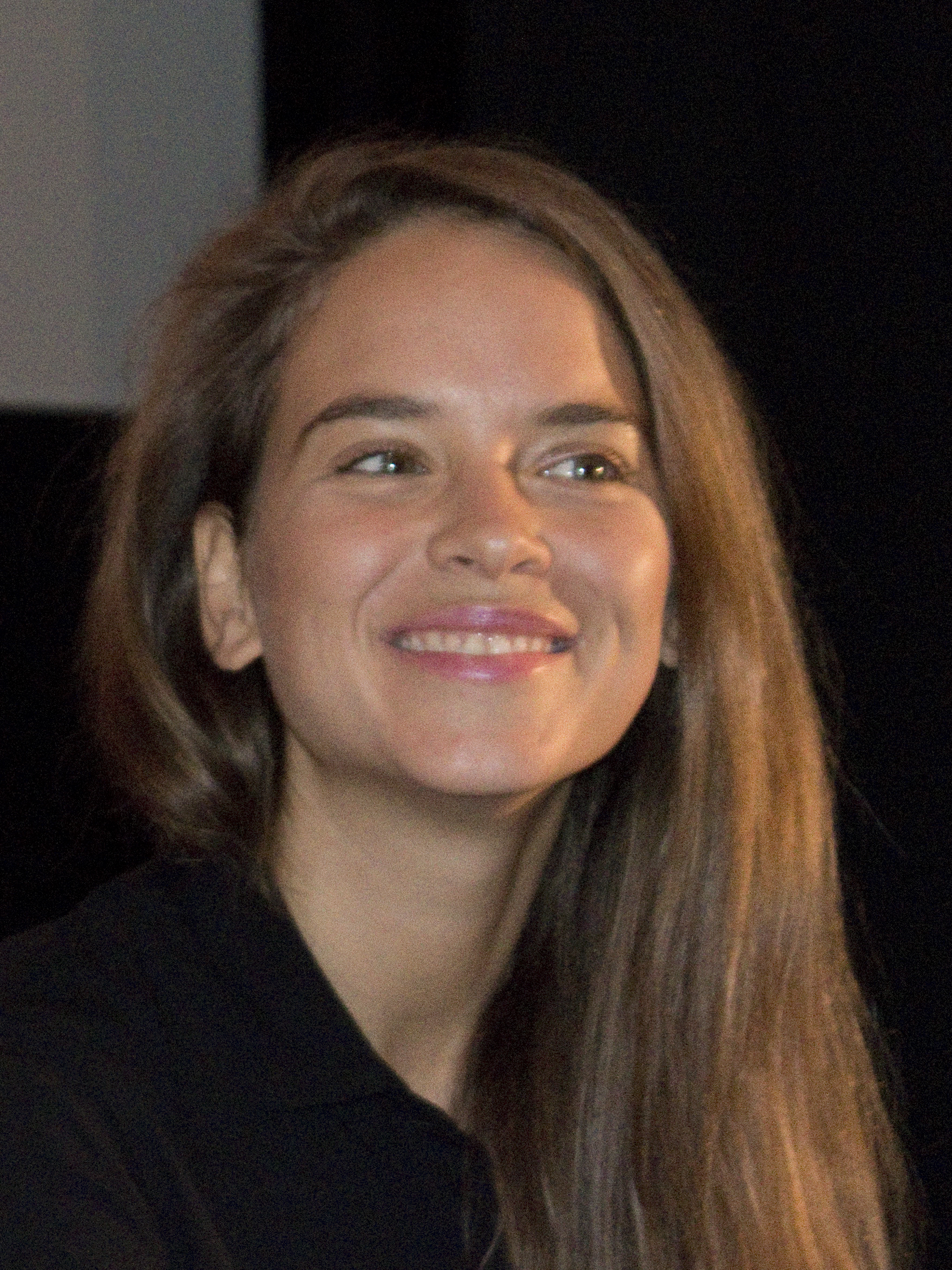
- Svarinská in 2019
- Born: 14 May 1989 (age 35); Bratislava, Czechoslovakia (now Slovakia)
- Occupation: Actress
- Years active: 2002–present

Kristína Svarinská (born 14 May 1989) is a Slovak actress and dubbing artist. She had a leading role in the most visited film in Slovak cinemas in 2011, Lóve. Svarinská starred alongside Juraj Bača on the first season finale of Rex. She plays ensemble cast as Ema Farkašová in 2018 medical drama Sestričky.

== Selected filmography ==
- Panelák (television, 2008)
- Lóve (2011)
- Colette (2013)
- 10 Rules (2014)
- In Silence (2014)
- The Seven Ravens (2015)
- Rex (television, 2017)
- Sestričky (television, 2018)
- Shotgun Justice (2019)
- Revír (web series, 2023)
- Volha (television, 2023)
- Lóve 2 (2024)
