= The Lady from Constantinople =

- Sziget a szárazföldön
- Directed by: Judit Elek
- Written by: Judit Elek, Iván Mándy
- Starring: Manyi Kiss
- Cinematography: Elemér Ragályi
- Edited by: Sándor Boronkay
- Music by: Vilmos Körmendi
- Distributed by: Mokép
- Release date: 1969
- Running time: 79 minutes
- Country: Hungary
- Language: Hungarian

The Lady from Constantinople is a 1969 Hungarian comedy-drama film directed by Judit Elek in her feature film debut. The film is a dramedy centering around a widowed elderly woman played by Manyi Kiss. The film was partially shot guerilla style in the streets of Budapest, with the lead actress interacting with bemused passersby on camera. The film has played in retrospective at Cannes Film Festival and Rotterdam Film Festival; it also played Out of Competition at the 1972 Cannes Film Festival and 1969 New York Film Festival. The restored film was screened again at 2023 Cannes Film Festival in Cannes Classics section. The 35mm restoration was undertaken by National Film Institute Hungary.

== Cast ==
- Manyi Kiss as old woman
- Éva Almási as young girl from the house
- László Bathó
- László Bathó
- József Bánfalvi
- Itala Békés as first twin
- Rita Békés as second twin
- János Csapó
- Tibor Desewffy
- István Dégi as young husband
- Béla Faludi
- Mária Farkas
- László Ferencz as flat exchanger
- Imre Gémessy
- Lucy Hamvay as landlady
- Magda Horváth as wife upstairs
- Béla Kardos
- László Kaszás
- Emese Keszegh
