= Irving Saraf =

American film producer

- Born: 1932
- Died: December 26, 2012 (aged 79–80); San Francisco, California, United States
- Occupations: Film producer, editor, director

Irving Saraf (1932 – December 26, 2012) was a Polish-born American film producer, film editor, film director and academic. Saraf won an Oscar for producing the 1991 documentary film, In the Shadow of the Stars. In total, Saraf had more than one hundred fifty film and television production credits. His resume included Poland, Communism's New Look, a 1965 television film; USA Poetry: Twelve Films About Modern Poets in 1966; and the 2009 documentary Empress Hotel following the residents of a low-income hotel in Tenderloin, San Francisco.

== Life and career ==
Saraf was born in Poland and raised in Israel. He emigrated to the United States in 1952, settling in San Francisco. He was married to his second wife, producer Allie Light, for 38 years. Light and Saraf formed a professional production partnership beginning in 1981. Saraf received a Bachelor of Arts in motion pictures from University of California, Los Angeles (UCLA). In addition to producing, Saraf taught film production at San Francisco State University.

Saraf founded the film division of KQED, a PBS channel in San Francisco. He also worked as the manager of the production company, Fantasy Films, owned by film producer, Saul Zaentz. Saraf produced many films with Zaentz, including as the post-production supervisor for One Flew Over the Cuckoo's Nest.

In 1995, Light and Saraf were jointly nominated for a News and Documentary Emmy for their work on the PBS show, Dialogues with Madwomen.

Irving Saraf died of complications from three years of ALS at his home in San Francisco on December 26, 2012, at the age of 80. He was survived by his second wife of 38 years, Allie Light; six children – Peter, Michal, Ilana, Alexis, Charles and Julia; and eight grandchildren. Peter Saraf is an Academy Award nominated producer whose credits include Adaptation (2002), Little Miss Sunshine (2006), and Our Idiot Brother (2011).
