= Revír =

- Written by: Vratislav Šlapák, Luboš Svoboda
- Directed by: Luboš Svoboda
- Starring: David Prachař, Jaromír Dulava, Kristína Svarinská, Ondřej Pavelka
- Country of origin: Czech Republic
- Original language: Czech
- No. of seasons: 1
- No. of episodes: 8

Production
- Running time: 30 minutes

Original release
- Network: TV Seznam
- Release: March 25 – May 6, 2023

Revír is a 2023 Czech TV series set in hunting environment. It was directed by Luboš Svoboda and written by Vratislav Šlapák and Luboš Svoboda. The series was produced by Wonder Prague for TV Seznam. David Prachař, Jaromír Dulava, Kristína Svarinská, Ondřej Pavelka, Michal Opletal and others appear in the main roles. The first episode of the series premiered on 25 March 2023 on TV Seznam. It had 5.21% audience share while second episode had a 4.32% share making the series one of strongest debuts for the channel.

The eight episodes comedy series Revír tells story of members of the oldest Czech hunting association. Protagonists face not only wild animals or the pitfalls of love, but above all they must defend their territory from a sneaky and rich businessman.

== Cast ==
- David Prachař as Rudolf "Ruda" Fuchs
- Marek Taclík as Bohumil "Bouchal" Štípal
- Ondřej Pavelka as Chairman
- Jaromír Dulava as Václav "Kazatel" Štípal
- Kristína Svarinská as Diana
- Antonin Mašek as Adam "TikTak"
- Linda Rybová as Tereza
- David Matásek as Leon Král
- Jitka Sedláčková as Mrs. Chairman
- Filip Rajmont as Rychman
- Michal Orion Opletal as Bubo Bubo singer

== Production ==
The series was filmed in the village of Skřivaň in the Central Bohemia region during August and September 2022 by Wonder Prague production.
