= Maria's Day =

1984 film

- Directed by: Judit Elek
- Written by: Luca Karall; György Pethő
- Produced by: Judit Ordody
- Starring: Edit Handel
- Cinematography: Emil Novák
- Edited by: Anna Kornis
- Release date: 6 September 1984
- Running time: 114 minutes
- Country: Hungary
- Language: Hungarian

Maria's Day (Hungarian: Mária-nap) is a 1984 Hungarian drama film directed by Judit Elek. It was screened in the Un Certain Regard section at the 1984 Cannes Film Festival.

== Cast ==
- Edit Handel - Júlia Szendrey
- Éva Igó - Marika Szendrey
- Sándor Szabó - Ignác Szendrey
- Imre Csiszár - Pál Gyulai
- Tamás Fodor - Árpád Horvát
- Lajos Kovács - István Petőfi
- Gábor Svidrony - Child of Júlia
- György Rácz - Child of Júlia
- Kati Bulcsu - Child of Júlia
- Peter Farkas
- Edit Illés
- Csaba Oszkay
- Szilvia Zsidai
