= The Sisters Liberty =

- Russian: Сестрички Либерти
- Directed by: Vladimir Grammatikov
- Written by: Lyudmila Ulitskaya
- Starring: Olga Stuchilova; Elena Stuchilova; Aleksandr Orlov; Evgeniy Redko; Aleksandr Martynov
- Cinematography: Aleksandr Antipenko
- Music by: Svetlana Galybina
- Production company: Gorky Film Studio
- Release date: 1990
- Running time: 88 minutes
- Country: Soviet Union
- Language: Russian

The Sisters Liberty (Russian: Сестрички Либерти) is a 1990 Soviet drama film directed by Vladimir Grammatikov. The film tells about twins named Vera and Lyuba, who are invited to pose for pictures in the Art Nouveau style.

== Plot ==
Two naive twin sisters, Vera and Lyuba, who work as seamstresses after graduating from a vocational school, live alone following their mother’s death, estranged from their alcoholic father. They are captivated by Serge, a modernist artist who introduces them to his elite social circle and uses them as models, even connecting them with photographer friends. Vera falls in love with photographer Vadim, but after he reveals his plans to be with someone else, she attempts suicide. Lyuba, desperate to help, seeks advice from their grandfather, who suggests a mystical ritual. She spends three days at the hospital, knitting a ball of thread to "anchor" her sister’s spirit, helping Vera narrowly escape commitment to a psychiatric ward.

As Vera recovers with the help of a psychoanalyst friend of Serge, Lyuba seeks revenge. Following their grandfather's guidance, she reluctantly performs a dark ritual that causes Vadim, now in London, to suffer a severe stroke. Vera's new relationship with Italian artist Guido strains her bond with Lyuba, and Lyuba dramatically changes her appearance to resemble her sister. During Vera and Guido’s wedding celebration, former friends, misled into thinking they’re visiting Vera, assault Lyuba in a brutal act of retribution. The sisters’ rift deepens; Lyuba ultimately leaves for Italy with Guido, threatening to harm him unless Vera lets him go. Distraught, Vera commits suicide, pulling Serge’s young lover with her. Lyuba, now abroad, sees Vera’s spirit in a mirror, holding the kitten she sacrificed as a symbol of the futility of her revenge.

== Cast ==
- Olga Stuchilova as Vera
- Elena Stuchilova as Lyuba
- Aleksandr Orlov as Painter Serzh
- Evgeniy Redko as Italian Painter Guido
- Aleksandr Martynov as Photographer Vadim
- Pyotr Kuleshov as Grandpa
- Aleksandr Vasilyev as Zhenya
- Andrey Zhigalov as Genka
- Vasily Funtikov as Kutsyy
- Yaroslava Turylyova as Aunt Lida
