= Dubček (film) =

2018 Slovak historical film

- Film poster
- Directed by: Laco Halama
- Starring: Adrian Jastraban
- Cinematography: Peter Kelíšek
- Music by: Ľubica Čekovská
- Release date: 19 April 2018
- Running time: 90 minutes
- Country: Slovakia
- Language: Slovak
- Budget: 842 885 €

Dubček (Slovak: Dubček – Krátka jar, dlhá zima lit. 'Dubček – Short Spring, Long Winter') is a 2018 Slovak historical film based on life of Alexander Dubček, a Slovak politician who served as the First Secretary of the Presidium of the Central Committee of the Communist Party of Czechoslovakia (KSČ) and who attempted to reform the communist government during the Prague Spring but was forced to resign following the Warsaw Pact invasion in August 1968.

== Cast ==
- Adrian Jastraban as Alexander Dubček
- Táňa Radeva as Anna Dubčeková, his wife
- Vladimír Hrabal as Ludvík Svoboda
- Jiří Zapletal as Josef Smrkovský
- Radoslav Šopík as Oldřich Černík
- Volodymyr Necheporenko as Leonid Brezhnev
- Oleksandr Loginov as Alexei Kosygin
- Jurij Skliar as Nikolai Podgorny
- Peter Trník as Vasiľ Biľak
- Ivo Novák as Zdeněk Mlynář
- Stanislav Pitonák as Jozef Brinzík, Dubček’s driver
- Stano Král as Gustáv Husák

== See also ==
- Havel (film)
- Walesa: Man of Hope
