= Allie Light =

American filmmaker (1935–2025)

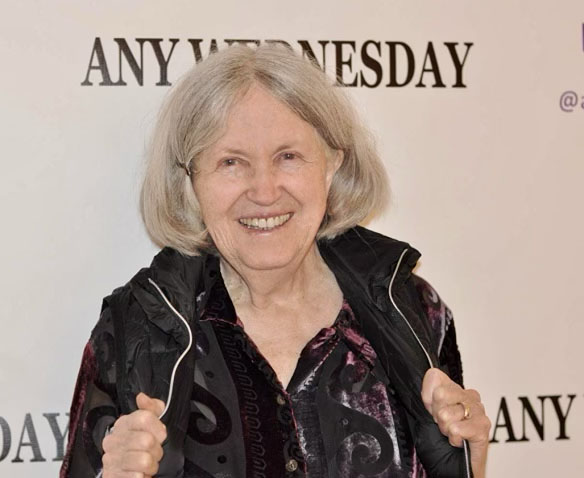
- Born: May 2, 1935; Dove Creek, Colorado, U.S.
- Died: September 17, 2025 (aged 90)
- Occupations: Film producer, director and editor
- Website: www.lightsaraffilms.com

Allie Light (May 2, 1935 – September 17, 2025) was an American film producer, director and editor. She notably won accolades by the Academy of Motion Picture Arts and Sciences and the National Academy of Television Arts and Sciences.

== Career ==
Light was the winner of the 1991 Academy Award for Best Documentary Feature for In the Shadow of the Stars and the 1995 News and Documentary Emmy for outstanding interview program for Dialogues with Madwomen. She wrote, directed and produced documentary films with her late partner, Irving Saraf.

She served on the Media Advisory Panel for the National Endowment for the Arts and was a member of the Academy of Motion Picture Arts and Sciences.

== Personal life ==
Light was born in Dove Creek, Colorado, on May 2, 1935. In 1953, she graduated from Balboa High School and married Charles Hilder before attending San Francisco State University. Having three children by the age 25 consequently contributed to a nervous breakdown, and she spent time in the Langley Porter Psychiatric Hospital at the University of California, San Francisco. In 1966, her husband, Hilder, died of lymphoma at the age of 32.

Light married film producer Irving Saraf, becoming his second wife. The couple formed a professional producing partnership beginning in 1971. Saraf died from Lou Gehrig's disease at their home in San Francisco, California, on December 26, 2012, at the age of 80.

Light died from heart failure on September 17, 2025 in Austin, Texas, at the age of 90.

== Filmography ==
| Year | Title | Credits | Notes |
|---|---|---|---|
| 1977 | Visions of Paradise, Five Films About American Folk Artists: POSSUM TROT - The Life and Work of Calvin Black | Director, Producer | |
| 1980 | Visions of Paradise, Five Films About American Folk Artists: HUNDRED AND TWO MATURE - The Art of Harry Lieberman | Director, Producer | |
| 1982 | Visions of Paradise, Five Films About American Folk Artists: GRANDMA'S BOTTLE VILLAGE - The Art OF Tressa Prisbrey | Director, Producer | |
| 1983 | Visions of Paradise, Five Films About American Folk Artists: THE MONUMENT OF CHIEF ROLLING - MOUNTAIN THUNDER | Director, Producer | |
| 1983 | Visions of Paradise, Five Films About American Folk Artists: THE ANGEL THAT STANDS BY ME - Minnie Evans' Paintings | Director, Producer | |
| 1981 | Mitsuye and Nellie, Asian American Poets | Director, Producer, Editor | |
| 1991 | In The Shadow Of The Stars | Director, Producer, Editor | 1991 Academy Award for Best Documentary Feature |
| 1993 | Dialogues With Madwomen | Director, Editor | Produced and Edited by Irving Saraf |
| 1996 | Shakespeare's Children | Director | |
| 1997 | Rachel's Daughters, Searching For The Causes of Breast Cancer | Director, Editor, Producer, additional camera operator | |
| 2000 | Blind Spot, Murder By Women | Director, Producer, Editor, additional camera operator | |
| 2001 | Desert Dogs | Editor | |
| 2002 | Children and Asthma | Director | |
| 2004 | Iraqi Lullaby | Editor | |
| 2005 | Good Food Bad Food, Childhood Obesity | Director, Producer, Editor | |
| 2006 | The Sermons of Sister Jane | Director, Producer, Editor | |
| 2009 | Empress Hotel | Director, Producer, Editor | |
| 2019 | Any Wednesday | Director, Producer, Writer | |
| 2025 | The Ship That Turned Back | Director, Writer | |
