= Táňa Radeva =

Slovak actress (1957–2025)

- Born: Tatiana Červeňáková; 27 August 1957; Michalovce, Czechoslovakia (now Slovakia)
- Died: 31 January 2025 (aged 67); Slovakia
- Citizenship: Czechoslovak citizenship (until 1992); Slovak citizenship (1993–2025)
- Education: Academy of Performing Arts in Bratislava
- Occupation: Actress
- Years active: 1980–2018
- Spouse: Miroslav Radev
- Children: 2

Tatiana Radeva, also known as Táňa Radeva, (née Červeňáková; 27 August 1957 – 31 January 2025) was a Slovak actress.

== Early life and career ==
Radeva was born in Michalovce on 27 August 1957. She studied theatre acting at the Academy of Performing Arts in Bratislava. As a stage actress, she was active at the Jonáš Záborský theatre in Prešov, (1980–1984), National Theatre Košice (1984–1995) and Andrej Bagar Theatre (1995–1997). After ending her active stage acting career, she started teaching acting at a Conservatory in Košice.

As a television actress, Radeva debuted in the fairy tale Tlstibáb (1977). In the later years of her career, she appeared in a number of long-running daytime TV shows (Ordinácia v ružovej záhrade, Búrlivé víno, Mesto tieňov). She was among the most proficient Slovak dubbing actresses. In addition, she occasionally starred in movies, including Bathory (2008), Lóve (2011), Dubček (2018) and Ostrým nožom (2019).

== Personal life and death ==
In 1981, Radeva married Bulgarian visual artist Miroslav Radev. They had two children.

In 2004, Radeva was diagnosed with ovarian cancer. Her treatment was successful and she achieved full recovery. In 2018, Radeva suddenly withdrew from public life. She died on 31 January 2025, at the age of 67.

== Filmography ==
- 1986 Šiesta veta
- 1994 Hon na čarodějnice
- 1994 Dvadsaťštyri hodín zo života istej ženy
- 1995 Veľmi starí obaja
- 1995 Iba taká hra
- 1996 Starožitné zrkadlo
- 1996 Jozef Mak
- 1997 V zajetí lásky
- 1997 Skupinový autoportrét prezidenta Beneše
- 1999 Amálka, ja sa zbláznim!
- 2000 Ako divé husy
- 2002 Kvet šťastia
- 2002 Popoluška
- 2004 O dve slabiky pozadu
- 2005 Ticho
- 2007–2012 Ordinácia v ružovej záhrade (TV series)
- 2008 Mesto tieňov
- 2008 Bathory
- 2009 Tango s komármi
- 2011 Lóve
- 2013 Búrlivé víno (TV series)
- 2018 Dubček
- 2019 Ostrým nožom
- 2019 Happy New Year
