= Judit Elek =

Hungarian film director (1937–2025)

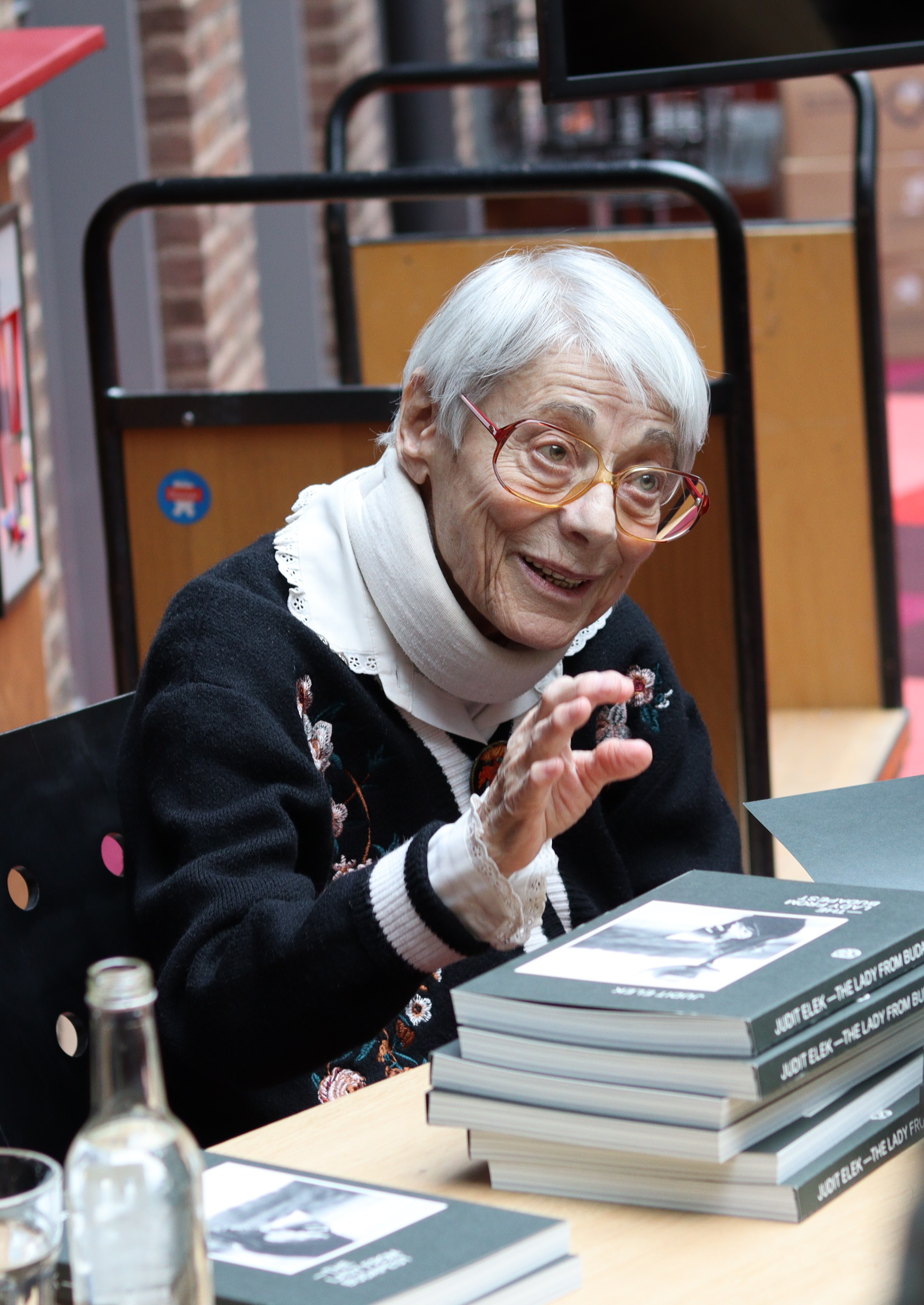
- Elek at the International Film Festival Rotterdam (IFFR) 2023
- Born: 10 November 1937; Budapest, Hungary
- Died: 1 October 2025 (aged 87)
- Occupations: Film director, screenwriter
- Years active: 1962–2006

Judit Elek (10 November 1937 – 1 October 2025) was a Hungarian film director and screenwriter. She directed sixteen films between 1962 and 2006. Her film Mária-nap was screened in the Un Certain Regard section at the 1984 Cannes Film Festival.

== Life and career ==
As a child, she survived the Second World War first in a sheltered house on Pozsonyi Street, Budapest, and then in the ghetto (November 1944 – January 1945). From 1956 to 1961, Elek studied at the University of Theatre and Film Arts in Budapest, in the class of film director Félix Máriássy. Her classmates included Pál Gábor, Imre Gyöngyössy, Zoltán Huszárik, Ferenc Kardos, Zsolt Kézdi-Kovács, János Rózsa, Éva Singer and István Szabó.

During this time she was a founding member of the Balázs Béla Studio, a workshop for experimental film. In 1968, Elek made her first feature film, Sziget a szárazföldön (The Lady from Constantinople). From the 1980s onwards, she made historical films such as The Trial of Martinovics and the Hungarian Jacobins (1980). In the 1990s, she shot films with a Jewish theme like Tutajosok (Memories of a River, 1990) and To speak the Unspeakable: The Message of Elie Wiesel (1996).

Elek was married to the Hungarian film director Zsolt Kézdi-Kovács (1936–2014). The cinematographer and producer Eli Laszlo Berger Eli Berger (László Berger, born in Budapest, 1970) is their son, known for the films A hét nyolcadik napja (The Eighth Day of the Week, 2006, directed by Judit Elek), Bankster (2016) and Dreams Are an Excuse (2023).

Elek died on 1 October 2025, at the age of 87.

== Filmography ==
Elek wrote many screenplays and directed many films, mostly in Hungarian, including:

- 1962, with Zsolt Kézdi-Kovács: Vásárcsarnok (Supermarket), short.
- 1963: Találkozás / Találkozás-Apróhirdetés (Encounter / Encounter by classified ad), short, 23 minutes.
- 1966: Kastélyok lakói (Inhabitants of Castles in Hungary in 1966), short documentary, 27 minutes.
- 1967: Meddig él az ember? I-II (How Long Does Man Live?), documentary, 60 minutes.
- 1969: Sziget a szárazföldön (The Lady from Constantinople), Elek's feature film debut, 76 minutes.
- 1970: Találkozunk 1972-ben / Sötétben-világosban (We Will Meet in 1972 – In Dark and in Light), television documentary, 35 minutes.
- 1974
  - Egyszerű történet (A Commonplace Story), documentary, 104 minutes.
  - Az első fénykép (Tamás Cseh: The First Photo), television documentary, 37 minutes.
- 1975: Istenmezején 1972-73-ban (On the Field of God in 1972-73), documentary, 78 minutes.
- 1976: Árvácska (Nobody's Daughter), screenwriter.
- 1980:
  - Vizsgálat Martinovics Ignác szászvári apát és társainak ügyében (The Trial of Martinovics and the Hungarian Jacobins), feature film, 127 minutes.
  - Majd holnap (Maybe Tomorrow), feature film, 104 minutes.
- 1984: Mária-nap (Maria's Day), feature film, 120 minutes.
- 1990: Tutajosok (Memories of a River), feature film, 147 minutes.
- 1995: Ébredés (Awakening), feature film, 110 minutes.
- 1996
  - Mondani a mondhatatlant: Elie Wiesel üzenete (To Speak the Unspeakable: The Message of Elie Wiesel), documentary, 105 minutes. In Hungarian, English and French.
  - Egy szabad ember – Fisch Ernő élete (A Free Man – The Life of Ernő Fisch), documentary, 107 minutes.
- 2006: A hét nyolcadik napja (The Eighth Day of the Week), feature film, 100 minutes.
- 2009–2010: Visszatérés – Retrace, feature film, 86 minutes. In Hungarian, Romanian, and English.
- 2018: És a halottak újra énekelnek (After All the Dead Sing Again...), music documentary, 72 minutes. In Hebrew and Yiddish.

== Awards ==
- Grand prize of the city of Miskolc 1968.
- Special Prize of the Locarno Festival 1968 for Meddig él az ember? I.-II. (How Long Does Man Live?).
- Critics CIDALC (Comité International pour la Diffusion des Arts et des Lettres par le Cinéma) Award at the 31st Venice Film Festival 1970.
- International Federation of Film Critics FIPRESCI award 1975 for Istenmeze in 1973-74 (On the Field of God in 1972-73).
- Chevalier (Knight) of the French Ordre des Arts et des Lettres (Order of Arts and Literature) 1986.
- Béla Balázs Award 1987.
- Montreal World Film Festival Jury Prize 1989 for Memories of a River (Tutajosok).
- Grand Prix of the Créteil International Women's Film Festival 1990 for Memories of a River.
- Grand Prix of the Salerno Film Festival 1996.
- Officer's Cross of the Order of Merit of the Republic of Hungary (A Magyar Érdemrend tisztikeresztje) 2006.
- Film Review Award 2007.
- Kossuth Prize 2008.
- Hungarian Master of Motion Picture Award (Magyar Mozgókép Mestere) 2009.

== Publications ==
Her publications include:

- with Kálmán Benda, Vizsgálat Martinovics Ignác szászvári apát és társai ügyében : filmforgatókönyv, eredeti iratok, Magvető, Budapest, 1983. Film scripts and documents for The Martinovics Case. In Hungarian.
- with Zsuzsa Bíró, Gábor Halász and Mihály Sükösd, Tutajosok : filmforgatókönyv, Magvető, Budapest, 1990. Film script in Hungarian.

== Controversy ==
For the purposes of the film Tutajosok (1990) 14 sheep were spread with a flammable substance, and then, at the order of Judit Elek, were burned alive. 69 scientists from the Jagiellonian University demanded that the authorities forbid Judit Elek entry to Poland. Scientists wrote among others: "No director knowing her own worth would debase herself for using so primitive and cruel methods".
