= Dialogues with Madwomen =

- Directed by: Allie Light
- Produced by: Irving Saraf
- Cinematography: Irving Saraf
- Edited by: Irving Saraf
- Distributed by: Women Make Movies
- Release date: 1993
- Running time: 90 minutes
- Country: United States
- Language: English

Dialogues with Madwomen is a 1993 documentary by Allie Light focusing on mental illness in women. It was later aired on television on the PBS series POV.

== Synopsis ==
In Dialogues with Madwomen, filmmakers Allie Light and Irving Saraf have seven "madwomen" — including Light herself — into telling their stories. Using a mixture of home movies, archival footage of psychiatric wards, re-enactments, and interviews with their subjects, Light and Saraf have created a complex, moving portrait of women in whom depression, schizophrenia, and multiple personalities coexist with powerful, sometimes inspired levels of creativity. Several of the women talk about traumatic experiences like childhood abuse, rape, homelessness and racism. In their stories of therapy, they mention therapist approaches like “One weekend he told me I could go home if I promised to bake a turkey. The next weekend I could go home if I promised to mop all the floors.” Throughout their stories, the participants find different ways to return to everyday life. The movie ends with the information that participant Karen Wong was murdered shortly after the interviews were finished.

The film does not openly criticise circumstances that led to mental health issues, or the ways the women were treated. Their statements stand alone, for the viewer to form their own impression and opinion. No shocking videos or photos are used, the intensity of the stories remains in the words of the participants.

== See also ==
- Atypical antipsychotics, which came onto the market after this film was made

== Karen Wong ==
In December 2013, a man whose DNA linked him to Karen Wong, one of the seven women in the film, was found guilty and convicted for her murder. His conviction was later overturned.
