= Abraham de Revier Sr. =

Abraham de Revier Sr. was the first elder of the Old Dutch Church of Sleepy Hollow in Sleepy Hollow, New York, when it was organized in 1697.

Likely a Belgian Walloon who had sought refuge in the Netherlands before emigrating to America, he was one of the original members of the church and was the patriarch of a leading family in the Philipsburg Manor's Upper Mills community. He has also been credited as the author of a private memorandum book that is now lost to history, which was heavily drawn upon in 1715 by Dirck Storm to compose the church's history, "Het Notite Boeck der Christelyckes Kercke op de Manner of Philips Burgh." However, he signed his 1716 will by his mark, so it is more likely that the memoranda should be credited to his son, Abraham de Revier Jr., a later elder of the church, who had predeceased his father about 1712.

The Old Dutch Church of Sleepy Hollow's book of records is one of the most significant records in Early American history. "Het Notite Boeck der Christelyckes Kercke op de Manner of Philips Burgh" is a rare surviving record of Dutch Colonial community life in the English-occupied Province of New York.
