= Lóve =

- Film poster
- Directed by: Jakub Kroner
- Written by: Jakub Kroner
- Produced by: Adriana Kronerová
- Starring: Michal Nemtuda; Jakub Gogál; Kristína Svarinská
- Cinematography: Mário Ondriš
- Edited by: Otakar Šenovský
- Music by: Lukáš Kobela
- Production companies: InOut Studio (SK); Evolution Films (CZ; co-prod.)
- Distributed by: Continental Film (SK); Falcon (CZ)
- Release dates: 13 October 2011 (SK); 12 January 2012 (CZ)
- Running time: 90 min.
- Countries: Slovakia; Czech Republic
- Language: Slovak
- Box office: € 548,781

Lóve is a 2011 Slovak-language film directed by Jakub Kroner, starring Michal Nemtuda and Kristína Svarinská, alongside Jakub Gogál. The action-romantic drama was released on 13 October 2011, distributed by Continental Film in Slovakia and Falcon in the Czech Republic.

Although the plot revolves around love determination, the original title refers to "money" instead, which serves as instrumental, quoting a term commonly used in the region amongst gypsies - "lóve." In English, therefore, "Falling in Money," "Love Deal," or "Dirty Love" could be used as apt equivalents for the title.

Despite the mixed reviews upon its theatrical release, the work has been ranked amongst the highest-grossing films in the Slovak cinema era, at number three as of November 2014.

== Cast ==
- Michal Nemtuda as Maťo
- Jakub Gogál as Tomáš
- Kristína Svarinská as Veronika
- Dušan Cinkota as Boris, the Garage's chief
- Martina Kmeťová (credited as Tina) as Sandra
- Samuel Spišák as Pedro Hrky
- Zuzana Porubjaková as Peťa
- Roman Luknár as Investigator
- Ady Hajdu as Teacher
- Ľuboš Kostelný as Rene
- Táňa Radeva as Host
- Viktor Horján as Hotel Manager
