= Memories of a River =

- Directed by: Judit Elek
- Written by: Judit Elek; Péter Nádas
- Produced by: Gábor Hanák; Hubert Niogret; András Ozori
- Cinematography: Gábor Halász
- Edited by: Katalin Kabdebo
- Music by: Péter Eötvös; György ifj. Kurtág
- Distributed by: Quartet Films Inc. (USA)
- Release dates: 8 February 1990 (Hungary); 20 March 1992 (U.S.)
- Running time: 147 minutes
- Countries: Hungary; France
- Language: Hungarian

Memories of a River (Hungarian: Tutajosok) is a 1990 Hungarian drama film directed by Judit Elek. It is a historical film set in 1882 and tells the story of the last trial in Hungary of a Jew for ritual murder.

== Synopsis ==
In the 19th century Austro-Hungarian Empire David Hersko, a Jewish shepherd, witnesses the attack of a young girl. His home is burned down and he finds shelter with the family of a Jewish logger. The loggers find the body of a young woman which they bury, going against local laws. They are charged with her murder and it is believed that they killed her as a ritual murder.

== Cast ==
- Sándor Gáspár as Herskó Dávid
- András Stohl as Matej
- Pál Hetényi as Csepkanics
- Zoltán Mucsi as Jákob
- Franciszek Pieczka as Vogel Ansel
- János Ács as Vay György
- Tamás Fodor as Eötvös Károly
- Róbert Koltai as Scharf József
- Andor Lukáts as Schwarz Salamon
- Georgiana Tarjan as Sára

== Controversy ==
For the purposes of the film 14 sheep were spread with flammable substance, and then to the order by Judit Elek were burned alive. 69 scientists from the Jagiellonian University demanded from authorities of forbidding Judit Elek entry to Poland. Scientists wrote among others: "No director knowing her own worth would debase herself for using so primitive and cruel methods".

== Awards ==
The film won the Prize of the Ecumenical Jury at the 1989 Montréal World Film Festival. In 1990 it won the Grand Prix at the Créteil International Women's Film Festival.
