= In the Shadow of the Stars =

- Directed by: Allie Light; Irving Saraf
- Produced by: Allie Light; Irving Saraf
- Cinematography: Michael Chin
- Distributed by: First Run Features
- Release date: August 14, 1991
- Running time: 93 minutes
- Country: United States
- Language: English

In the Shadow of the Stars is a 1991 American documentary film about the San Francisco Opera by the husband-and-wife team of Irving Saraf and Allie Light. It depicts the lives of the various members of the chorus, rather than the big name stars.

== Operas featured in the film ==
- The Flying Dutchman (Richard Wagner)
- The Rake's Progress (Igor Stravinsky)
- Macbeth (Giuseppe Verdi)
- L'Africaine (Giacomo Meyerbeer)
- Il Trovatore (Verdi)
- La Boheme (Giacomo Puccini)

== Accolades ==
The film which won the 1991 Academy Award for Best Documentary Feature for Light and Saraf.

== Availability ==
It was released on DVD in 2005 with extra scenes and the Oscar acceptance speech by Saraf as bonus features.

It is available for streaming.
