= Vasily Funtikov =

Russian actor (1962–2025)

- Василий Фунтиков
- Born: Vasily Vladimirovich Funtikov; 5 July 1962; Moscow, Russian SFSR, USSR
- Died: 27 May 2025 (aged 62); Moscow, Russia
- Occupation(s): film and theatre actor
- Years active: 1974–2025

Vasily Vladimirovich Funtikov (Russian: Василий Владимирович Фунтиков; 5 July 1962 – 27 May 2025) was a Soviet and Russian film and theatre actor.

== Life and career ==
Funtikov was born in Moscow on 5 July 1962. In 1984 he graduated from the Boris Shchukin Theatre Institute. During his military service in 1984–1986, he was an actor of the Soviet Army Theatre. From 1989 until his death he worked at the Moscow Pushkin Drama Theatre.

Funtikov died in Moscow on 27 May 2025, at the age of 62.

== Selected filmography ==
- 1979: Tuning Fork as Ganushkin
- 1986: An Umbrella for Lovers as traffic police officer
- 1988: Presumption of Innocence as Mikhail Sovchi
- 1990: The Sisters Liberty as Kutsiy
