= Indian Brook Road Historic District =

Historic district in New York, United States

- U.S. National Register of Historic Places
- U.S. Historic district
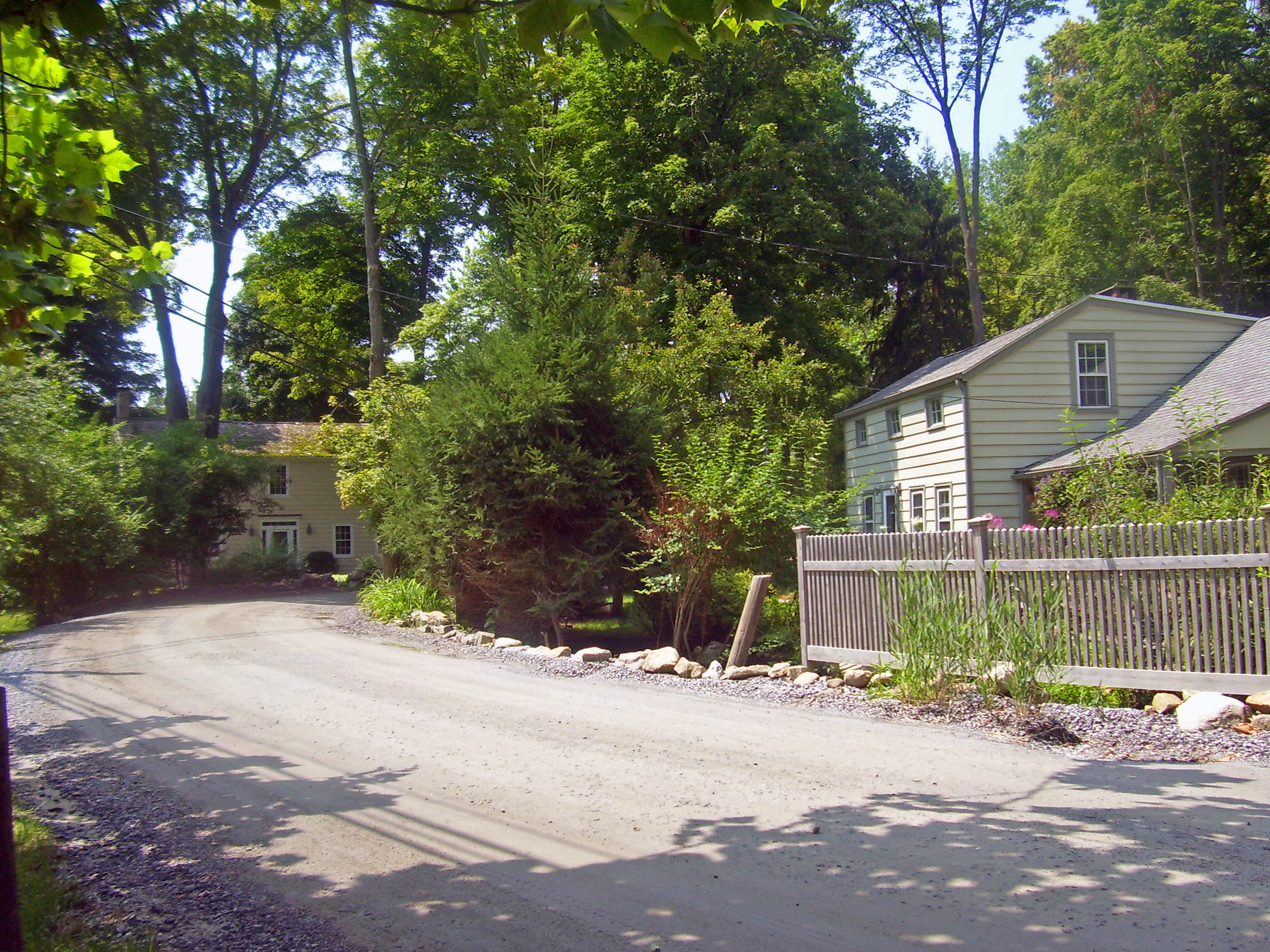
- "The Bend", near west end of district, 2008

- Location within New York Location within the United States
- Location: Garrison, NY
- Nearest city: Peekskill
- Coordinates: 41°24′41″N 73°54′58″W
- Area: 30 acres (12 ha)
- Built: 1783-1940
- Architectural style: Mid 19th Century Revival, Early Republic, Late 19th And 20th Century Revivals
- NRHP reference No.: 93000853
- Added to NRHP: August 19, 1993

The Indian Brook Road Historic District is located on both sides of that street's intersection with US 9 east of Garrison, New York, United States. Its 30 acres (12 ha) contain 15 buildings, all but two of which are considered contributing properties to its historic character.

From the late 18th to mid-20th century, the area was a rural hamlet known first as Warrens and later as Nelson's Corner. Unlike most other such small country settlements, it has survived industrialization and the automobile era with its basic plan, and most of its buildings, relatively intact. In 1993, the area was designated a historic district and added to the National Register of Historic Places.

== Geography ==
The district consists of two irregularly shaped areas along unpaved Indian Brook Road joined by a narrow corridor along the brief, paved section of Route 9 that connects them. These boundaries reflect the extent of Nelson's Corner during its peak period of growth in the late 19th century. They include all of ten separate lots.

The land in the district is heavily wooded, with tall trees shading the buildings within, mostly frame houses and supporting structures no higher than two stories. Indian Brook, the tributary of the Hudson River that lends its name to the district, closely parallels the road and is even partially included as a contributing property, due to an early mill pond's location along it. The entire area is amid the lesser hills of the Hudson Highlands.

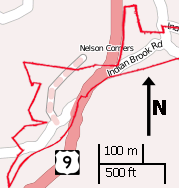
Map of district, with boundaries in red

On the east side of US 9, the district takes in a small portion of Old Albany Post Road, the only contributing property separately listed on the Register as an important early local transportation route and one of the oldest dirt roads still in use in the United States. At this junction is the Bird and Bottle Inn, a surviving tavern from the early days of Nelson's Corner that incorporates a small portion of the original building. The west goes as far as a former intersection known as "The Bend" and includes a large lot that climbs the slopes of Cat Hill to the northwest.

== History ==
=== 19th century ===
Around the time of the Revolution, Samuel Warren's home in the area became well known enough as a rest stop along the Albany Post Road for "Warrens" to appear on maps. In the early 19th century, his son John leased, and built a farm on, 411 acres (166 ha) that include the entire current historic district. His house, on the future site of the Bird and Bottle, was also open as a tavern for travelers. John's brother Samuel Jr. also built a house for his family on the property, just west of the highway. Both are prominent features of the district, built in the vernacular style common among Americans of English descent at that time.

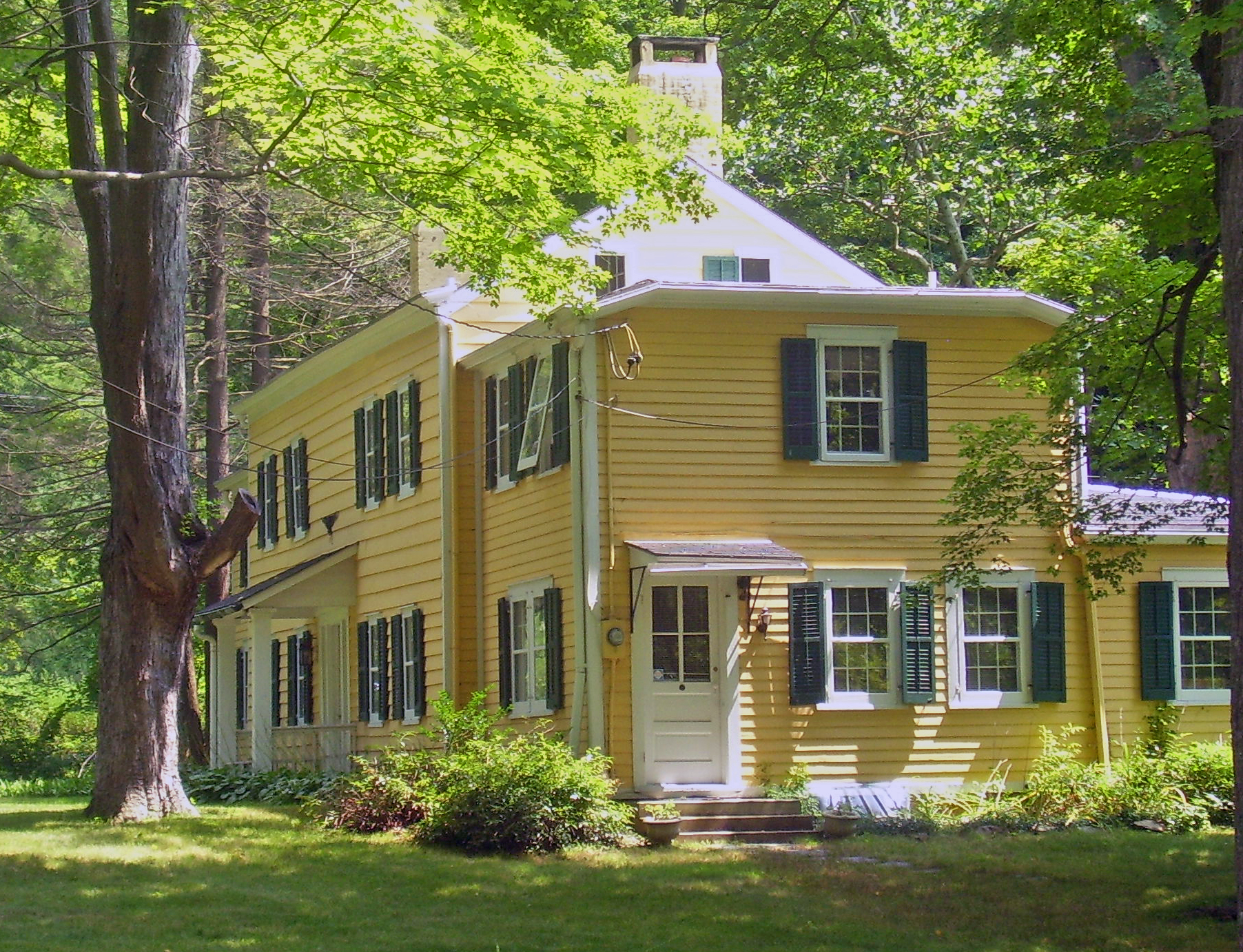
Samuel Warren's house, 2008

In 1804, the Highlands Turnpike, a more level alternative route to the Post Road currently followed by US 9, was opened. At the hamlet, it deviated slightly from the current alignment, following Indian Brook down to a four-way junction known as the Bend, where a now-abandoned roadway went south over the brook to rejoin the road still in use.

Warren was not able to buy his land outright until 1821, when a compensation claim by the heirs of Frederick Philipse, the local landowner whose holdings had been confiscated by the state for his Loyalist sympathies during the war, was settled on the condition that all leaseholds be abolished.

Sometime in the early 19th century (the exact date is not known), John Warren dammed Indian Brook to create a mill and pond as a way of increasing the economic worth of his property. This began to make the farm into a settlement rather than just a rest stop on a long highway, as the other three houses in the district were built during this period. They show the influence of the Federal style popular in the new nation at the time. Samuel Warren's house was also enlarged during this period, and the sections of the brook nearby were channelized to control flooding

The Warren brothers both died in the mid-1830s. After a series of transactions that briefly took John's property out of the family, by 1854 it was back in the family, owned by his son-in-law John Nelson. Samuel's home remained in his descendants' hands for another four decades.

John Nelson closed the tavern, since the rise of the railroads had diverted much of the traffic once handled by the Post Road to the riverside, and used the building as his family residence. Maps now named the area Nelson's Corner. He continued to operate the mill. A school was built in 1844, but other than that there were few changes to the hamlet in the late 19th century, as the focus of the economy had moved elsewhere with the rise of industry.

=== 20th century ===
In the early 20th century, another transportation shift brought travelers back to the hamlet. Automobiles became more common, and adventurous drivers ventured down long-neglected rural roads in search of interesting places like Nelson's Corner. Route 9 was designated and paved in 1912, and once again Nelson's Corner was a stop on a long road between New York City and Albany. The state cut a new section of Route 9 that bypassed the Bend, making passage through the hamlet easier for travelers and also helping to preserve the hamlet buildings on that side of the new highway.

Roadside businesses flourished on the new road for a time. In 1939, John Warren's old tavern was expanded in the Colonial Revival style that had already been applied to other buildings in the hamlet, and reopened as the Bird and Bottle. After World War II, the state built limited-access roads like the Taconic State Parkway and the New York State Thruway that made the trip up the Hudson Valley faster and took much of the traffic off Route 9 again.

Many of those who had visited the area were city residents, and some were drawn to move to the area at least part-time, a trend that had begun with the large estates built in the area during the late 19th century. In the late 20th century, with easier auto and rail access, this led to the suburbanization of eastern Putnam County. Some of this development has occurred near the district, but not in it. It remains very similar to the place it was in the early 19th century.
