= The Bird & Bottle Inn =

Bar in New York

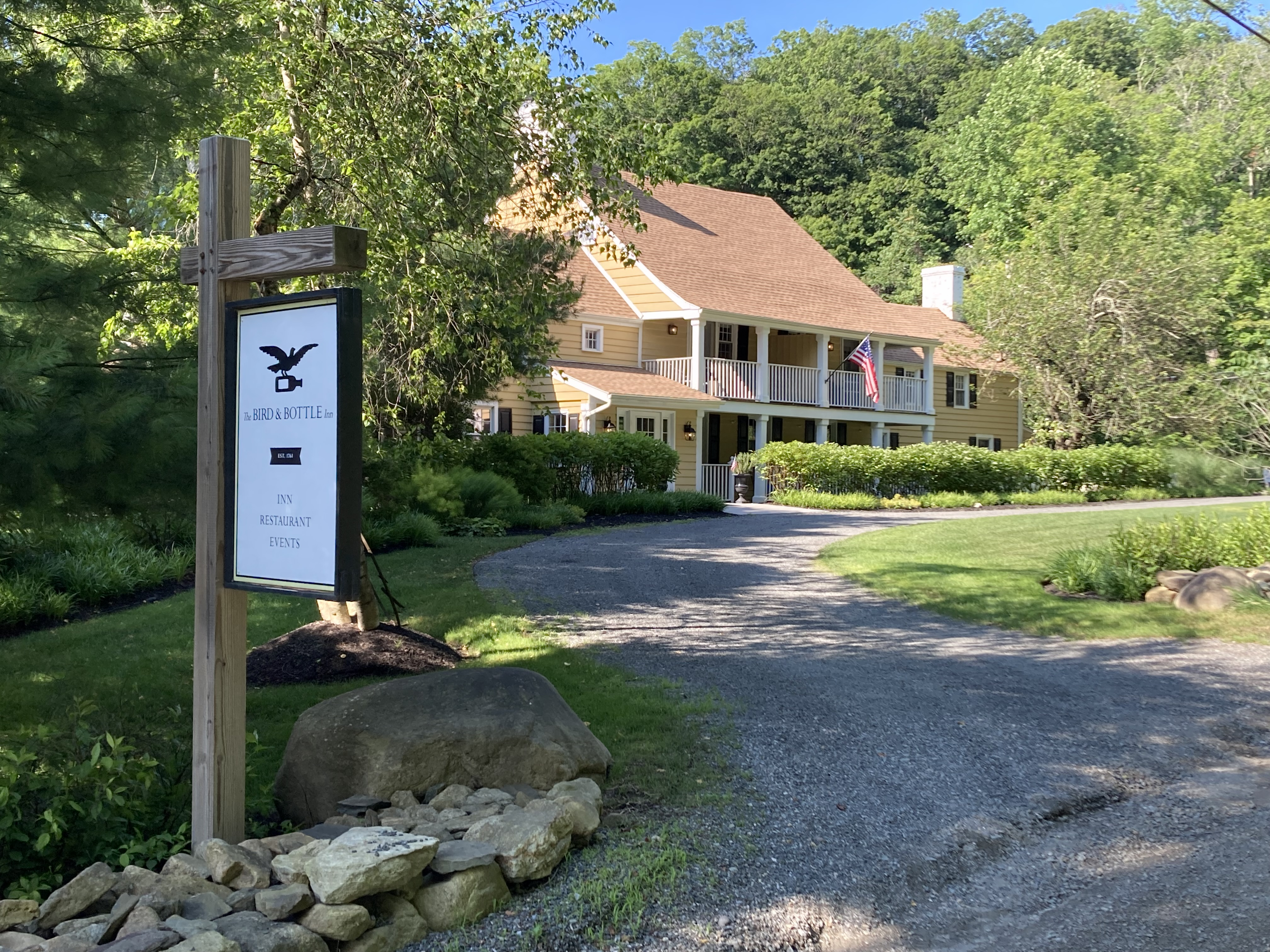
- The Bird & Bottle Inn, 2025

General information
- Location: 1123 Old Albany Post Road; Garrison, NY
- Estimated completion: 1761
- Governing body: Private

Website
- thebirdandbottleinn.com

The Bird & Bottle Inn, formerly named Warren's Tavern, is a historic inn located in Garrison, New York. It is situated at the intersection of Old Albany Post Road and Indian Brook Road, in western Putnam County.

It is currently ran as a Restaurant and Inn with four rooms and one small cottage.

== History ==
The Inn was established in 1761 by Samuel Warren, who converted his home into a stage coach stop initially named “Warren’s Stop” for those traveling by stagecoach from New York City to Albany. Established fifteen years before the start of American Revolution, Warren's Tavern changed hands to Warren's son-in-law, Absalom Nelson, when he married Esther Warren at the beginning of the conflict in 1776. The renamed Nelson's Tavern became a favorite watering hole for both Continental and British soldiers during the Revolution before it was ultimately seized by the Continental Army, which used it as a regional headquarters.

Historical figures such as George Washington, Alexander Hamilton, and the Marquis de Lafayette likely passed through, stopping to water their horses and grab a pint at this well-traveled waypoint.

In the 1870s, Emily Warren Roebling lived here with her husband, Washington Roebling, chief engineer of the Brooklyn Bridge. When he fell ill, Emily took over much of his work, liaising between city officials, workers, and her husband to bring the bridge to completion - making her the first female field engineer. Emily became the first person to cross the completed bridge, carrying a rooster with her for good luck.

In the 1940's, Lena Richard became The Bird & Bottle Inn’s first Executive Chef. A trailblazing Black chef from Louisiana, Richard brought her signature Creole flavors to the Hudson Valley. At a time when segregation laws still ruled much of the South, Richard was the first Black person to host a television cooking show and to write a Creole cookbook. During this time, the Inn was a destination frequented by socialites, celebrities, and starlets.

Around the time Lena Richard moved on, rising New York City culinary figure James Beard was brought in as a consultant, who also created a menu for the Bird and Bottle Inn.

Later in the 60s, the Bird and Bottle was purchased by Skitch Henderson, Johnny Carson’s band leader, who would visit the inn quite frequently.

In 2020, Hudson Valley locals Marjorie Tarter and Brendan McAlpine acquired and restored the Inn. The Bird & Bottle Inn then reopened in April 2022, with Executive Chef Kristian Meixner leading the kitchen into a new chapter.
