= Post road =

Road or route for transporting mail

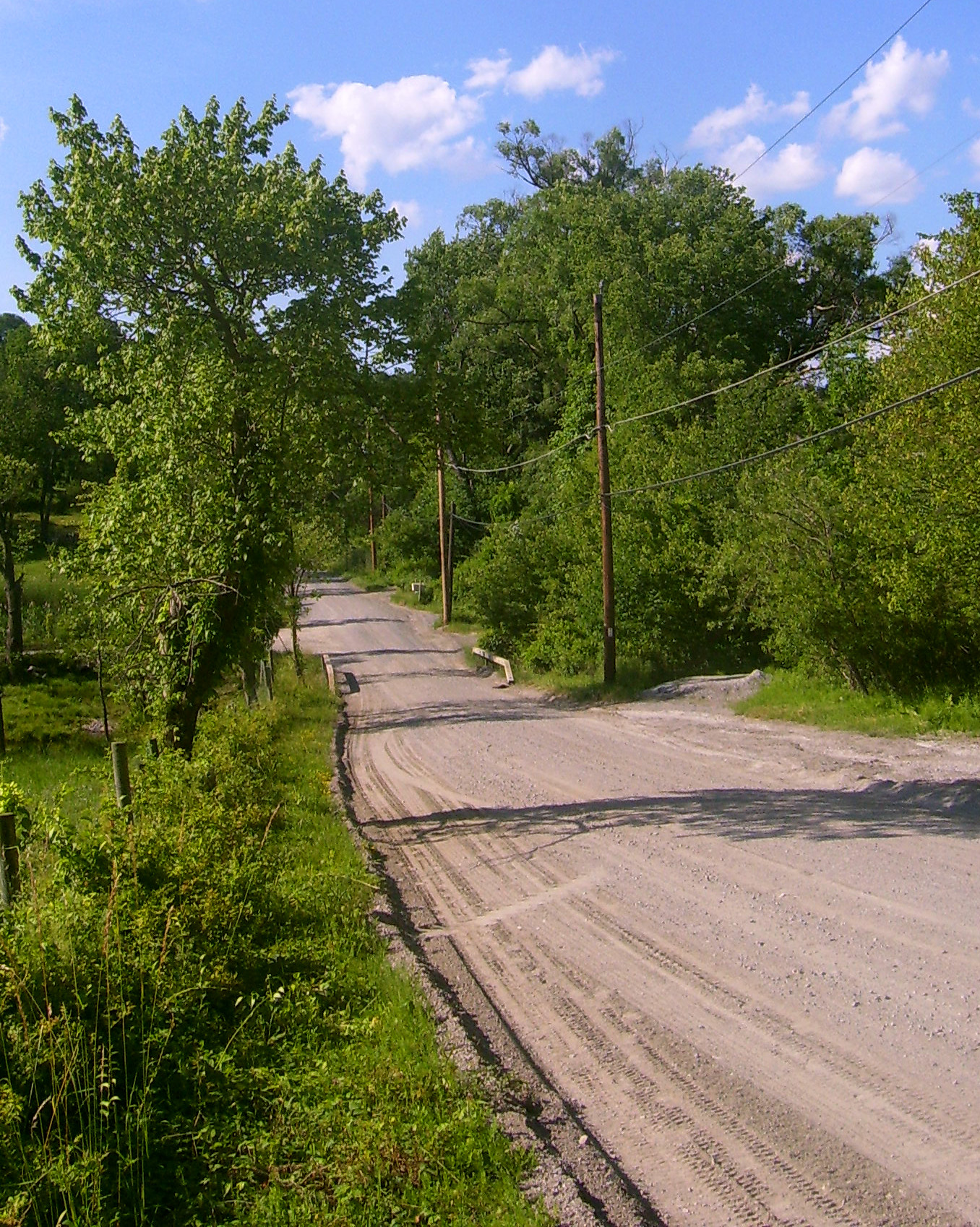
Old Albany Post Road in Philipstown, New York, a section that remains unpaved and has been listed on the National Register of Historic Places

A post road is a road designated for the transportation of postal mail. In past centuries, only major towns had a post house and the roads used by post riders or mail coaches to carry mail among them were particularly important ones or, due to the special attention given them, became so. In various centuries and countries, post road became more or less equivalent to main road, royal road, or highway. The 20th century spread of postal service blurred the distinction.

== Asia ==
Great Post Road (Dutch: De Grote Postweg), from Anyer to Panarukan, Indonesia, was a post road in Asia, built during the governancy of Herman Willem Daendels of Dutch East Indies from 1808 to 1811.

== Europe ==
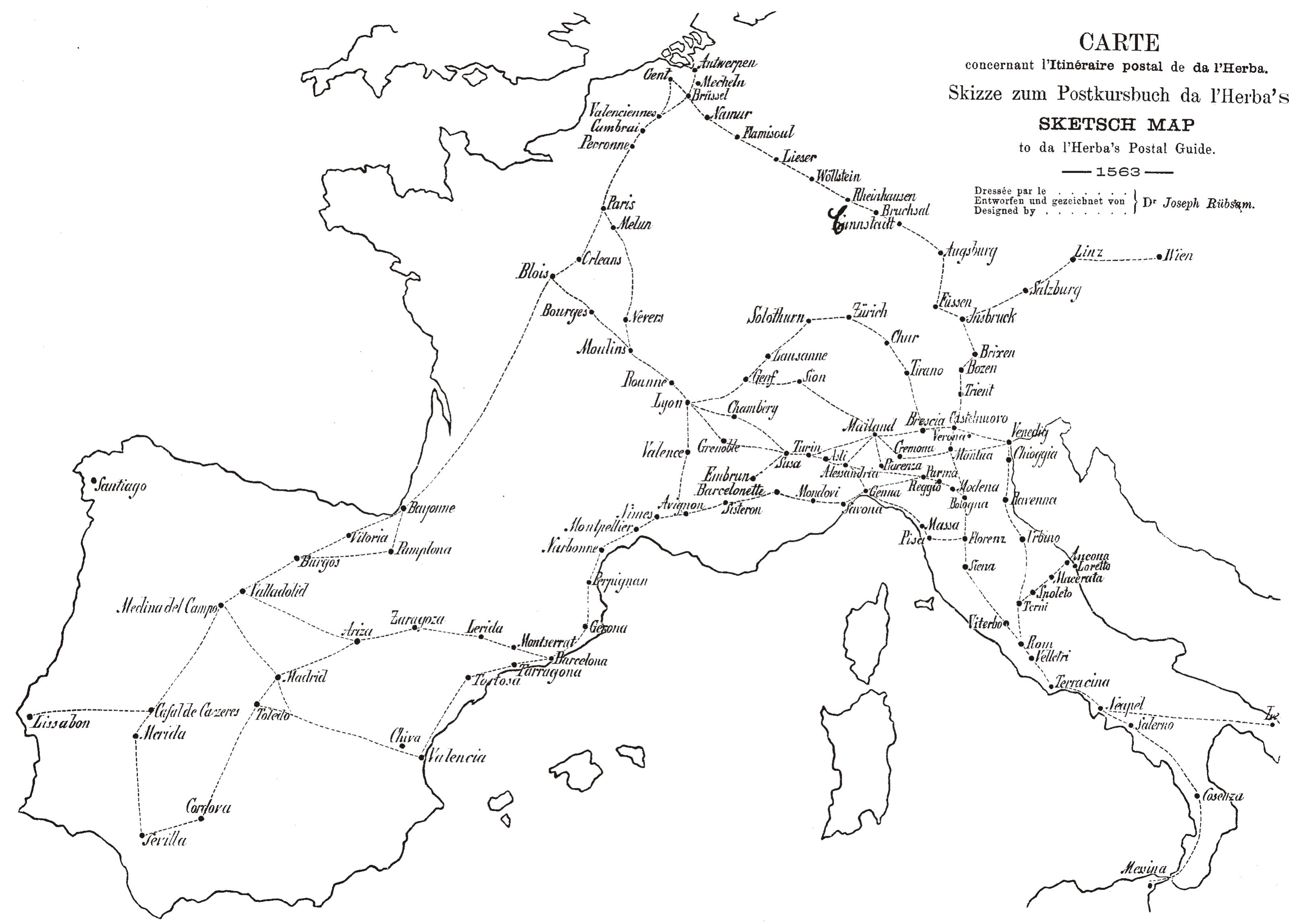
1563 post road map of Europe

Notable post roads in Europe include:

- Antwerp-Venice Post Road, similar to the Dutch Post Road.
- Bremen-Hamburg Post Road, approved by the king of Sweden on July 5, 1665 to establish regular mail service. A second route was established from Cuxhaven through the Land of Wursten to Lehe.
- Dutch Post Road, (German: Niederländischer Postkurs) established in 1490, connected the Netherlands with coaching inns in Germany and Italy.

== North America ==
The following are notable post roads in Canada and the U.S.

=== Canada ===
Chemin du Roy was built between Montreal (Repentigny) and Quebec City from 1731 to 1737, for mail and as a means of travel for the key settlements in New France/Lower Canada. It was later incorporated as Quebec Route 2 and is now part of Quebec Route 138.

Two notable post roads built in the late 1700s and early 1800s were Dundas Road (The Governor's Road) and Kingston Road (Lakeshore Road or York Road) to provide a route for mail and stagecoaches between key settlements in Upper Canada.

The latter route, which became The Provincial Highway in 1917 (Ontario Highway 2 c. 1923), and the former which became a Dundas Highway in 1920 (Ontario Highway 5 in 1925), were the beginning of the provincial highway system in Ontario.

=== United States ===
In what was to later become the United States, post roads developed as the primary method of communicating information across and between the colonies.

The Articles of Confederation authorized the national government to create post offices, but not post roads. Adoption of the U.S. Constitution changed this, as Article I, Section Eight, known as the Postal Clause, specifically authorizes Congress the enumerated power "to establish post offices and post roads". This was often interpreted to include all public highways. U.S. Supreme Court justice Joseph Story defended the broad interpretation that had become dominant in his influential Commentaries on the Constitution of the United States (1833).

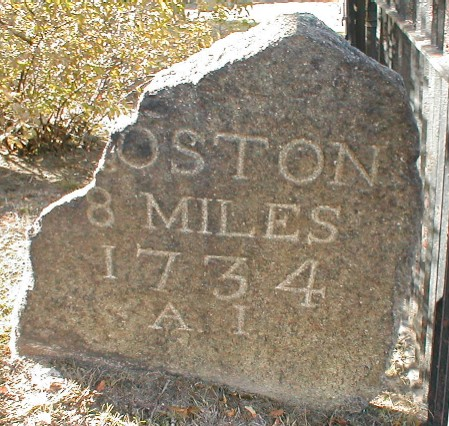
18th century milestone on the Boston Post Road

Notable American post roads built for the purpose include:

- Albany Post Road, which connects New York City to Albany, the capital of New York State
- Boston Post Road, which traverses New England from New York City to Boston, Massachusetts
- White Plains Post Road, the southernmost section of New York State Route 22, known as the White Plains Post Road in the 18th and 19th centuries, was a major highway connecting New York City to White Plains, Westchester's county seat.
