= Lena Richard =

American chef and television host (1892–1950)

- Born: Lena Paul; September 9, 1892; New Roads, Louisiana, U.S.
- Died: November 27, 1950 (aged 58); New Orleans, Louisiana, U.S.
- Education: Fannie Farmer Cooking School
- Spouse: Percival Richard
- Culinary career
- Cooking style: Creole
- Television show: Lena Richard's New Orleans Cook Book

Lena Richard (née Paul; September 9, 1892 or 1893 - November 27, 1950) was a chef, cookbook author, restaurateur, frozen food entrepreneur, and television host from New Orleans, Louisiana. In 1949, Richard became the first Black woman to host her own television cooking show. Her show aired from October 1949 - November 1950 on local television station WDSU.

Richard initially received her culinary education locally in New Orleans, and later in Boston where she attended the school founded by Fannie Farmer. She graduated in 1918 and returned to New Orleans where a few years later she opened her own catering business and several restaurants. She opened a cooking school in 1937 in New Orleans specifically for Black students. In 1939, Richard self-published Lena Richard's Cook Book. The cookbook made her the first Black author to feature New Orleans Creole cuisine.

== Early life ==
Lena Richard (née Paul) was born in New Roads, Louisiana, on September 9, 1892, to Françoise Laurent and Jean-Pierre Paul. She was baptized as Marie Aurina Paul in the Catholic Church on October 9, 1892, and was one of six children. At an early age, Richard moved to New Orleans, where her mother and aunt worked as domestic servants for Alice and Nugent Vairin at their home on Esplanade Avenue. Richard helped her mother and aunt in the kitchen after school, and upon her graduation, the Vairins hired her. Richard prepared lunches, then moved on to more complex dinners and events. Recognizing her culinary talent, in 1918 the Vairins sent Richard to Fannie Farmer's School of Cookery in Boston. Talking about her time at the School, she told the New York Herald Tribune in 1939: "When I got up there, I found out in a hurry they can’t teach me much more than I know." After graduating from the Fannie Farmer School of Cookery she returned to New Orleans.

== Culinary career ==
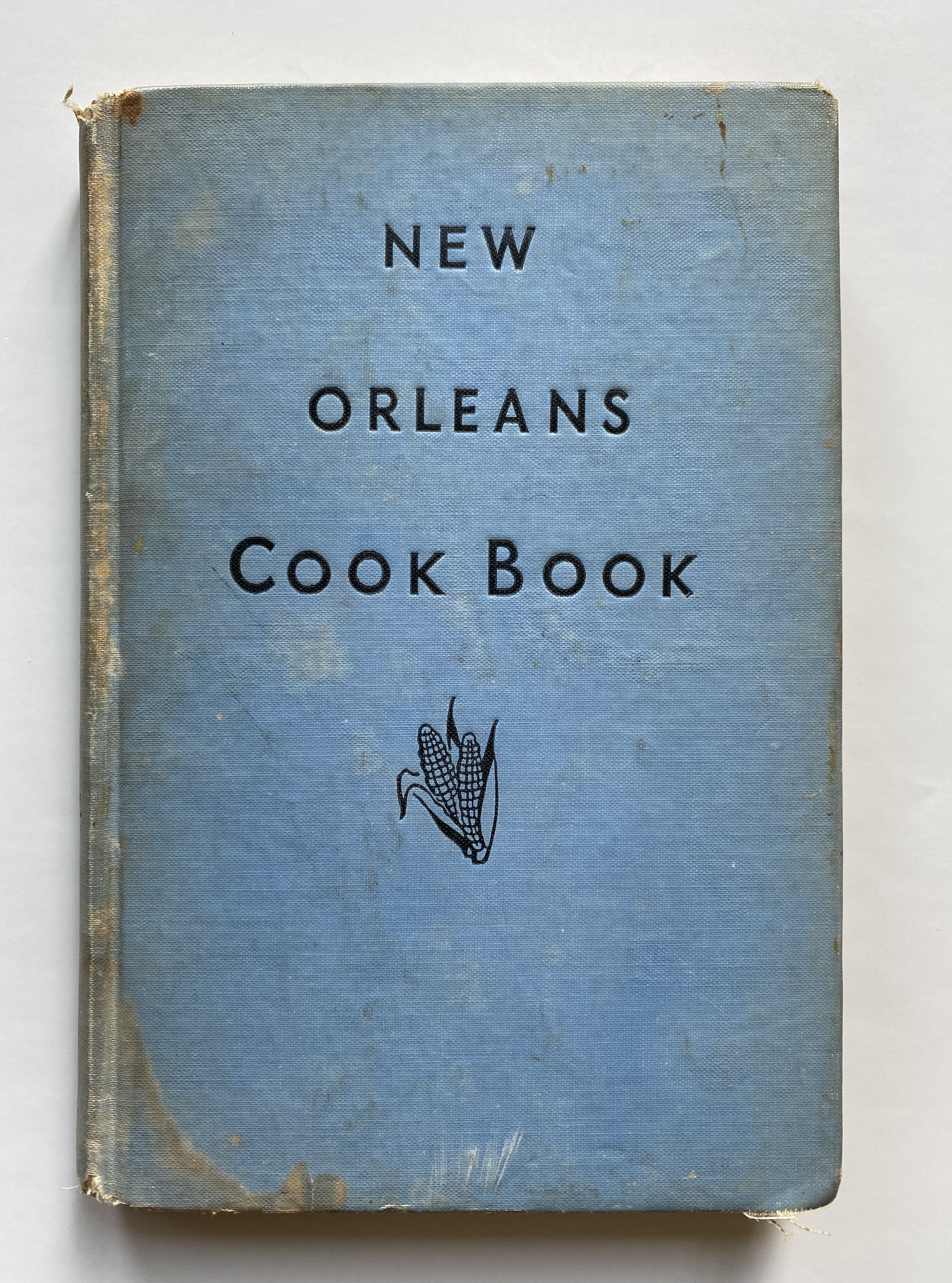
Image of the cover of Lena Richard's "New Orleans Cook Book," which was first published by Houghton Mifflin in 1940.

After returning to New Orleans from the Fannie Farmer School of Cookery, Richard started a catering business, offering her services for parties, weddings and debutante balls. During the next two decades, she started multiple businesses and also worked as a cook at the Orleans Club, an elite organization for white women.

In 1937, Richard and her daughter, Marie, started a cooking school to give Black students the tools they needed to succeed as business owners. Among Richard's specialties were crawfish bisque, turtle soup, potato pancakes, stewed eggs and oysters, a 16-pound fruitcake and lamb chops with pineapple. As historian Ashley Rose Young writes, "Richard's school targeted young black men and women. She sought to train them in the culinary sciences so as to give them a chance to make a career for themselves in a city that historically disenfranchised African Americans."

In response to the increasing demand for her recipes, Richard published Lena Richard’s Cook Book in 1939. This cookbook, dedicated to Alice Vairin, who had died in 1931, featured traditional recipes from various Black cooks who contributed to Creole cuisine. Richard dictated over 300 recipes, menus and culinary tips to her daughter, Marie, who transcribed them before handing them to a typist. The book not only showcased Southern dishes but also included recipes for chocolate waffles, asparagus sandwiches and tea dainties. A year later, Houghton-Mifflin reissued her book with a new title, New Orleans Cook Book.

Richard traveled across the country to promote her book, selling 700 copies for $2 during a one-month trip. She was featured in both the New York Times and New York Herald Tribune.

Richard was recruited to be the head chef at Bird and Bottle Inn in Garrison, New York, where she worked for 18 months starting in 1940. Richard soon returned to New Orleans and opened Lena's Eatery in November 1941.

She was recruited by Colonial Williamsburg to be the chef at the Travis House, where she cooked for dignitaries and military leaders from 1943 until 1945.

In 1946, Richard started a frozen food business, creating fully cooked packaged dinners that were flown across in the United States. The meals were prepared by Bordelon Fine Foods Company of Metairie.

In 1949, Richard opened her last restaurant, The Gumbo House. It employed most of Richard's family and remained open after her death. She served 54 gallons of gumbo weekly at her 12 white-tablecloth-covered tables, defying segregation by welcoming both Black and white customers. In all, Richard owned three popular restaurants.

== Media career ==
From 1949 to 1950, Richard hosted a 30-minute cooking television show called Lena Richard's New Orleans Cook Book. The show aired twice weekly and was broadcast on New Orleans' first television station, WDSU. Once filming wrapped and the studio lights were off, the cameramen rushed to grab the leftover food. During the program, Richard and her assistant, Marie Matthews, guided their television audience through recipes from Richard's cookbook. Richard and Matthews were the first African-Americans to host a cooking show in an age when few households owned television sets. The show featured Creole cuisine — a fusion of primarily French, Spanish, West African and Native American ingredients and techniques that originated in New Orleans.

== Personal life ==
Lena married Percival Richard on July 29, 1914. Percival Richard managed business matters for her.

Lena and Percival had one daughter, Marie Richard, who graduated from Xavier University with a degree in Home Economics. Marie helped her mother open her cooking school in New Orleans in 1937.

On Sunday, November 26, 1950, Richard attended Mass before heading to her restaurant to meet a fan who had traveled from Los Angeles and ordered one of everything on the menu. After a long day of cooking, she reported feeling unwell and returned to her home. She suffered a heart attack early the next morning at the age of 58.

== Recognition ==
In 2020, Richard was one of eight women featured in "The Only One in the Room" display at the Smithsonian National Museum of American History.

== Bibliography ==
- Lena Richard's Cook Book. New Orleans, Rogers Printing Co., 1939. OCLC 2759171
- New Orleans Cookbook. Boston, Houghton Mifflin Company., 1940. OCLC 594170
