= 1767 Milestones =

Mile markers in Massachusetts, US

- U.S. National Register of Historic Places
- U.S. Historic district
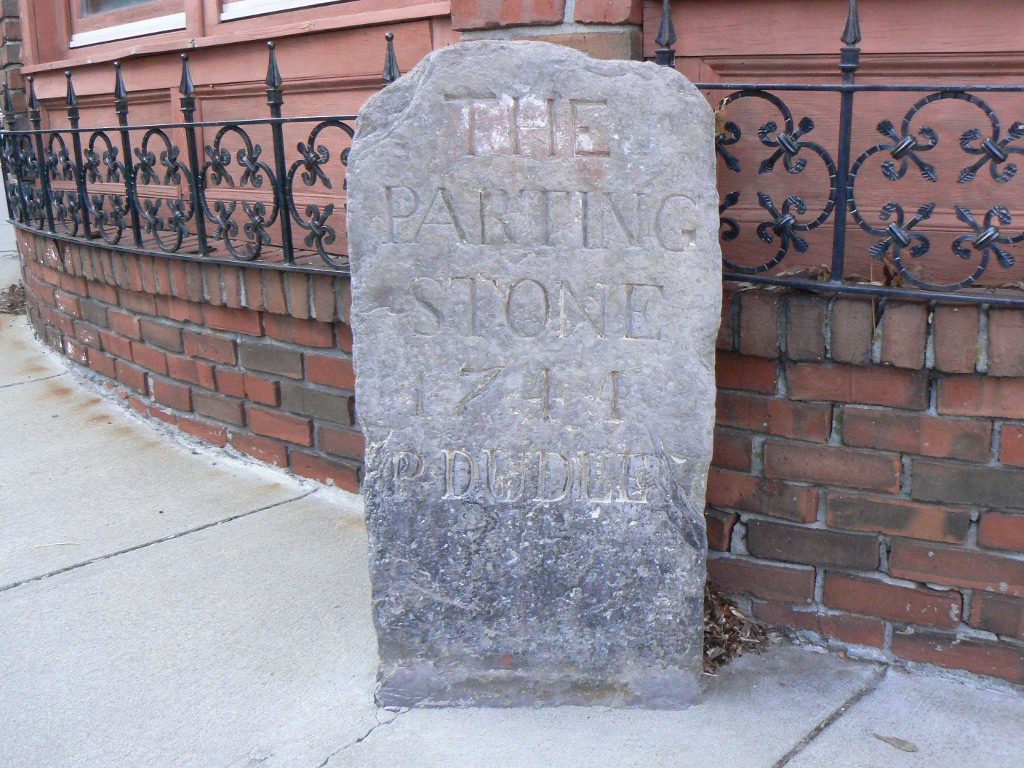
- The "Parting Ways" stone in Roxbury
- Location: Massachusetts between Springfield and Boston
- Built: various dates; many pursuant to a policy dating to 1767
- NRHP reference No.: 71000084
- Added to NRHP: April 7, 1971

The 1767 Milestones are historic milestones located along the route of the Upper Boston Post Road between the cities of Boston and Springfield in Massachusetts. The 40 surviving milestones were added to the National Register of Historic Places in 1971. Massachusetts had a total of 129 surviving milestones in 2014, including those along the upper Post Road. The stones are so named, despite having been placed in many different years, because of a 1767 directive of the Province of Massachusetts Bay that such stones be placed along major roadways.

== History ==
The first stone was erected by Paul Dudley, one of the prominent citizens of early 18th century Massachusetts, in Roxbury, which was at the time a separate community. Roxbury was located at the end of the Boston Neck, a narrow isthmus separating the mainland from the Shawmut Peninsula, where Boston was located. Travelers going by land from Boston to other areas had to travel over the neck and through Roxbury to reach their destinations. The Roxbury junction where Dudley placed the first stone was where several routes branched, heading south and west across New England.

Dudley erected several stones along the road from Boston to Cambridge which wound its way from Beacon Hill along what is now Washington Street through the Dudley Square area to what is now Huntington Avenue, then along Harvard Street through Brookline Village, Coolidge Corner, and Allston crossing into Cambridge at the Great Bridge, where modern JFK Street in Cambridge becomes North Harvard Street in Allston. The stones that Dudley erected have the initials PD on them, usually at the bottom of the stone. The most chatty of these milestones (not part of this collection), is inscribed P Dudley rather than PD, and is located on the corner of Centre and South Streets in Jamaica Plain.

The stones listed for miles 23 through 29 in Wayland and Sudbury are actually guideposts rather than milestones, and do not list any mileage. They were erected at road intersections rather than at the mile marks. The stones are quarried granite posts with plug and feather tool marks and post-date 1800.

The state highway department was directed in 1960 to undertake their preservation. Twenty-nine of the forty listed markers underwent restoration work funded by the Massachusetts Department of Transportation, between 2015 and 2018.

== List ==
Miles to Boston	Year placed	Image	Location	Town	Notes
	1741		Centre Street and Roxbury Street; 42.33006°N 71.09176°W	Boston (Roxbury)	Known as the "Parting Ways Stone"
4	1729		841 Huntington Avenue; 42.33294°N 71.11074°W	Boston (Mission Hill)	
5	1729		210 Harvard Street; 42.34033°N 71.12088°W	Brookline	
6	1729		142 Harvard Avenue; 42.35181°N 71.13163°W	Boston (Allston)	
7	1729		240 North Harvard Street; 42.36160°N 71.13013°W	Boston (Allston)	
8	1734		Old Burying Ground; 42.37508°N 71.11926°W	Cambridge	
23			River Road and Water Row; 42.37196°N 71.38542°W	Wayland	
24			Route 20 and Landham Road; 42.36102°N 71.40164°W	Sudbury	
25			Route 20 and Concord Road; 42.36224°N 71.41618°W	Sudbury	
26			Route 20 and Nobscot Road; 42.36012°N 71.42497°W	Sudbury	
27			Route 20 and Dudley Road; 42.3602°N 71.4372°W	Sudbury	Listed as missing in 2009 state survey.
28			Route 20 and Peakham Road; 42.35979°N 71.45841°W	Sudbury	
29			Wayside Inn Road and Dutton Road; 42.35797°N 71.47122°W	Sudbury	
33			143 East Main Street; 42.32917°N 71.62231°W	Northborough	
35			Main Street and Dean Park; 42.29592°N 71.69659°W	Shrewsbury	
43	c. 1760		West Main Street; 42.29418°N 71.74997°W	Shrewsbury	Relocated to the Town Common (42.29673°N 71.71407°W) in 2016
47			140 Lincoln Street; 42.27810°N 71.79449°W	Worcester	
48			39 Salisbury Street; 42.27307°N 71.80072°W	Worcester	Moved to 30 Elm Street (Worcester Historical Museum) around 1987. Placed in Wheaton Square (42.273116°N 71.80042°W) as part of the 2010s restoration.
53			Route 9 at Collier's Corner; 42.24000°N 71.88527°W	Leicester	
54			Main Street east of Paxton Street; 42.24200°N 71.90696°W	Leicester	Stolen in the 1930s and recovered in the 1990s. It was relocated to museum space in the town library in 1996. As part of the 2010s restoration project, it was placed on the town common (42.24627°N 71.90573°W) near its original location. A replica with no markings is embedded in a stone wall just west of Paxton Street on the south side of Main Street (42.24595°N 71.90699°W).
56			Between 1676 and 1710 Main Street (Route 9); 42.25039°N 71.94287°W	Leicester	
57			500 Main Street (Route 9); 42.25581°N 71.95755°W	Spencer	
58			325 Main Street (Route 9); 42.25208°N 71.97580°W	Spencer	
59			Route 9 at Spencer Shopper's Village; 42.24398°N 71.99379°W	Spencer	
60			Route 9 at St. Mary's Cemetery; 42.23531°N 72.00895°W	Spencer	
61			133 West Main Street (Route 9); 42.23145°N 72.02646°W	Spencer	
62			West of 324 East Main Street (Route 9); 42.22709°N 72.04541°W	East Brookfield	Stone has been reengraved with loss of integrity.
63			184 North Brookfield Road; 42.22788°N 72.06290°W	East Brookfield	
64			Slab City Road near North Brookfield line 42.23088°N 72.07886°W	Brookfield	
65			East Main Street; 42.22211°N 72.09342°W	Brookfield	
66			East of 31 West Main Street (Route 9); 42.21656°N 72.11006°W	Brookfield	
67			102 Foster Hill Road; 42.22739°N 72.12046°W	West Brookfield	
68			East end of town common 42.23617°N 72.13703°W	West Brookfield	
69			147 West Main Street (Route 9); 42.23409°N 72.15656°W	West Brookfield	
70			Route 67 near Old Patrick Road; 42.22286°N 72.17164°W	Warren	
71			129 Washington Street; 42.21297°N 72.18262°W	Warren	
72			Main Street near Winthrop Terrace; 42.21336°N 72.19198°W	Warren	
73			60 Baypath Road; 42.19870°N 72.20423°W	Warren	
74			970 Read Street; 42.18867°N 72.21935°W	Warren	
99			State Street at Springfield Armory; 42.10711°N 72.57930°W	Springfield	Relocated around 1980 to the Armory Museum (42.1076°N 72.5815°W)

== See also ==
- National Register of Historic Places listings in northern Boston, Massachusetts
- National Register of Historic Places listings in southern Boston, Massachusetts
- National Register of Historic Places listings in Brookline, Massachusetts
- National Register of Historic Places listings in Cambridge, Massachusetts
- National Register of Historic Places listings in Middlesex County, Massachusetts
- National Register of Historic Places listings in Worcester County, Massachusetts
- National Register of Historic Places listings in Hampden County, Massachusetts
