= Gifford School =

Coordinates: 42°22′02.83″N 71°16′39.42″W

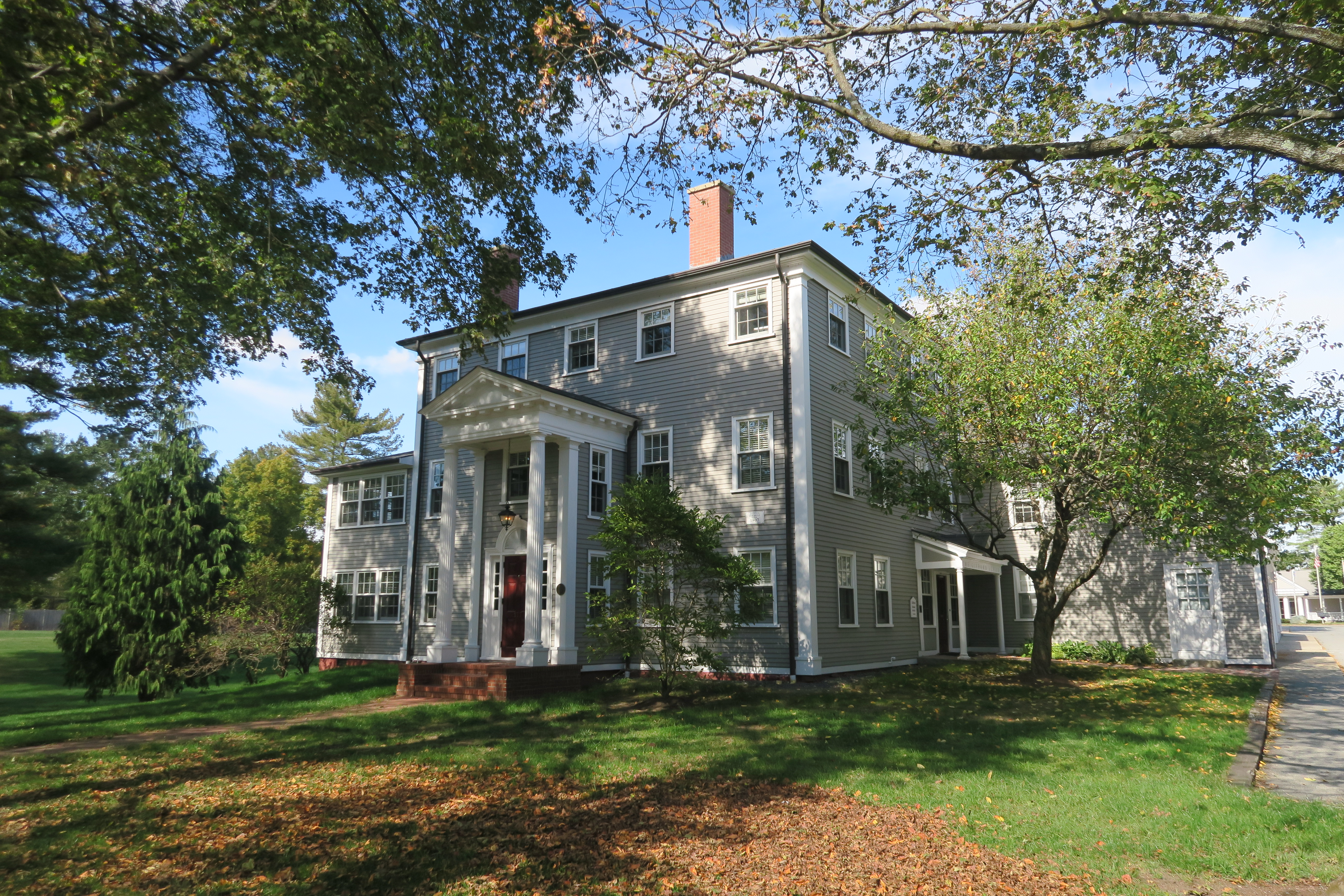
- Gifford School
- Route 20, Weston, Massachusetts

Information
- School type: Special Education
- Grades: 4th-12th
- Enrollment: 100 (2009)

The Gifford School is a Massachusetts-approved private special education school located in Weston, Massachusetts. It was founded in 1964 in Cambridge by Margaret Gifford. The school moved to Weston in 1971. Gifford serves approximately 90 students from 4th through 12th grade who are referred by their public school districts from over 50 communities throughout the state.

== Campus ==
The Gifford School's campus sits on approximately 27 acres. The campus features dedicated school buildings for its lower, middle, and high school programs; a multi-purpose building (The Fenn Center) with a state-of-the-art multimedia studio, gymnasium, science room, computer lab, and cafeteria; The Scovell Center, which contains an art room and library; and a free-standing woodshop. Its historic 200-year-old main building, the Bassichis House, was dedicated in 2015 in honor of Mike Bassichis upon his retirement after 40 years as Executive Director.

== Fire ==
On Wednesday, December 23, 2009, at 6:04 am, The Fenn Center was involved in a 4-Alarm fire and was severely damaged. The fire was determined to be accidental. Backup was called in from the surrounding towns of Lexington, Waltham, Natick, Newton, Sudbury, and Wellesley. The fire caused Route 20 and the on-ramp to Route 128 to be closed during the morning commute.
