= Albany Post Road =

Post road in New York

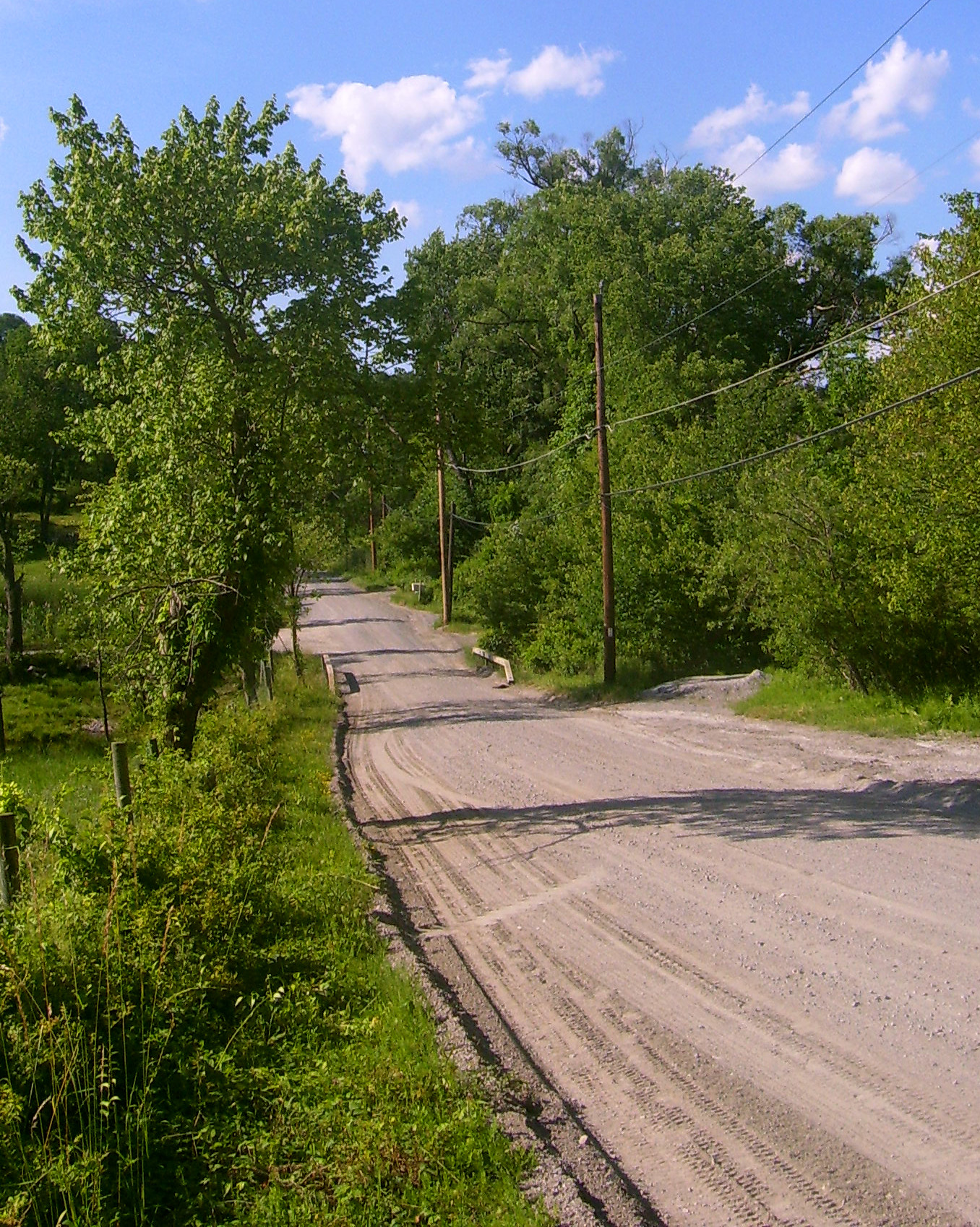
Old Albany Post Road in Philipstown, a section that remains unpaved and has been listed on the National Register of Historic Places

The Albany Post Road was a post road – a road used for mail delivery – in the U.S. state of New York. It connected New York City and Albany along the east side of the Hudson River, a service now performed by U.S. Route 9 (US 9).

== History ==
The Post Road followed the original Wickquasgeck Trail, carved into the brush of Manhattan by its Native American inhabitants. This trail originally snaked through swamps and rocks along the length of Manhattan Island. Upon the arrival of the Dutch, the trail soon became the main road through the island from Nieuw Amsterdam at the southern tip. The Dutch explorer and entrepreneur David Pietersz. de Vries gives the first mention of it in his journal for the year 1642 ("the Wickquasgeck Road over which the Indians passed daily"). The Dutch named the road "Heerestraat".

In 1669, the provincial government of New York designated a postal route between New York City and Albany, the colony's two most important settlements at the time. It was little more than a narrow path in many places, following old trails used by the Wiccoppe and Wappinger tribes. Stagecoaches headed north originally started from Cortlandt Street in lower Manhattan; later the starting point was moved up to Broadway and Twenty-first Street.

In 1703, the legislative body provided for the postal road to be a "public and common general highway" along the same route, starting in Kingsbridge, Bronx and ending at a ferry landing in present-day Rensselaer. It was called the Queen's Road, after Queen Anne.

The King's Bridge was built as a toll bridge in 1693, by Frederick Philipse, a wealthy merchant and major landholder in the Bronx and Westchester. The bridge, the first connecting Manhattan with the mainland, spanned the former Spuyten Duyvil Creek at what today is Kingsbridge Avenue. At Kingsbridge the Post Road split with the eastern spur heading to Boston, and the northern branch heading to Albany.

The Albany Post Road, still called "Broadway", continues to Van Cortlandt Park, through what was once called the "Vale of Yonkers", and passes Greystone, the former estate of Samuel J. Tilden, now part of Untermyer Park. The village of Ardsley takes its name from the estate of Cyrus W. Field, who owned 780 acres (3.2 km2) of land lying between Broadway (Dobbs Ferry) and the Sprain Brook (Greenburgh) named Ardsley Park. He had named Ardsley Park after the English birthplace of his immigrant ancestor, Zechariah Field (East Ardsley, West Riding of Yorkshire, England), who immigrated to the U.S.

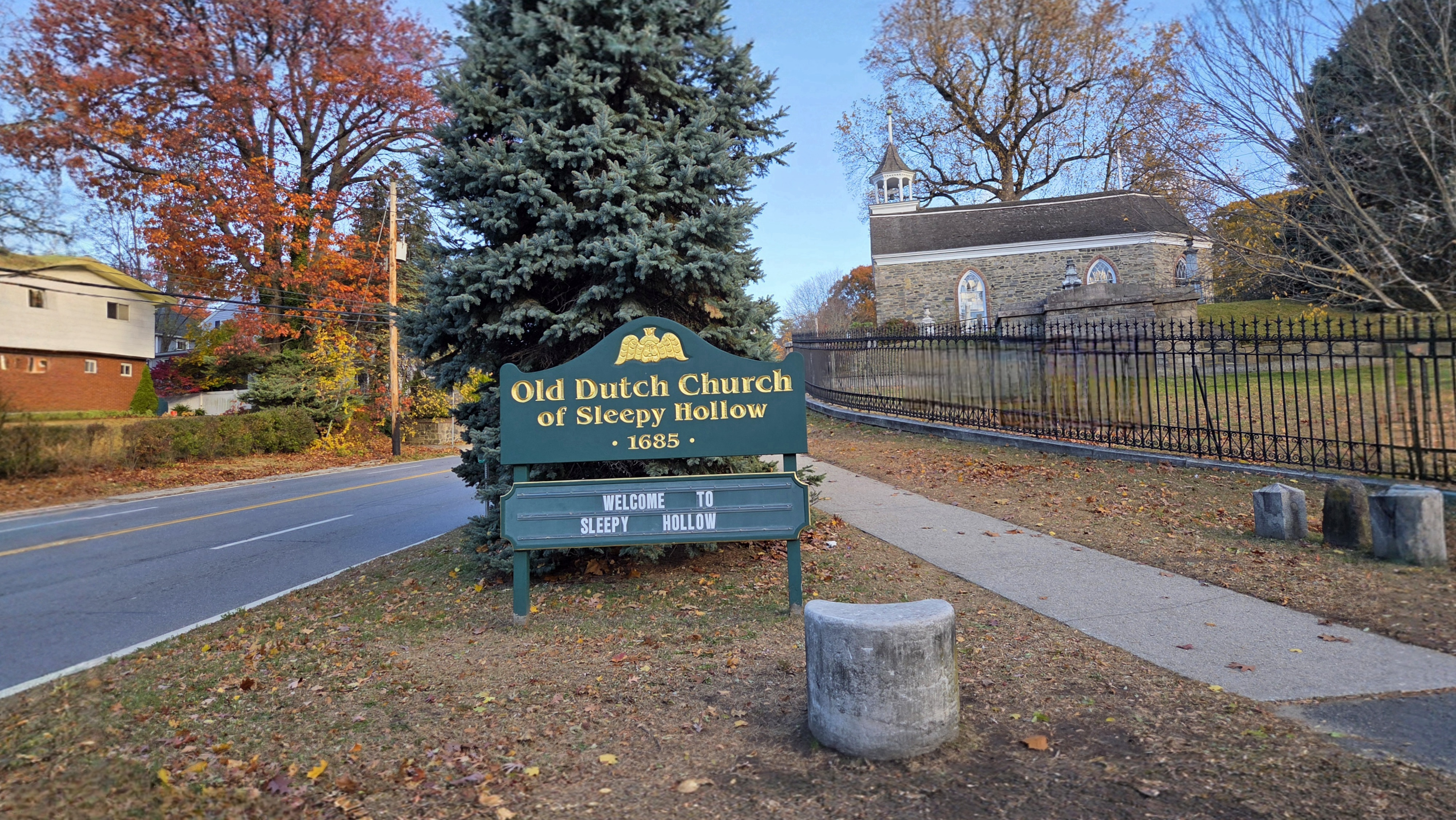
Broadway (U.S. Route 9) as it passes the Old Dutch Church of Sleepy Hollow. Visible in the lower-right corner is an 18th-century milestone, bottom center is a mounting block, or carriage stone.

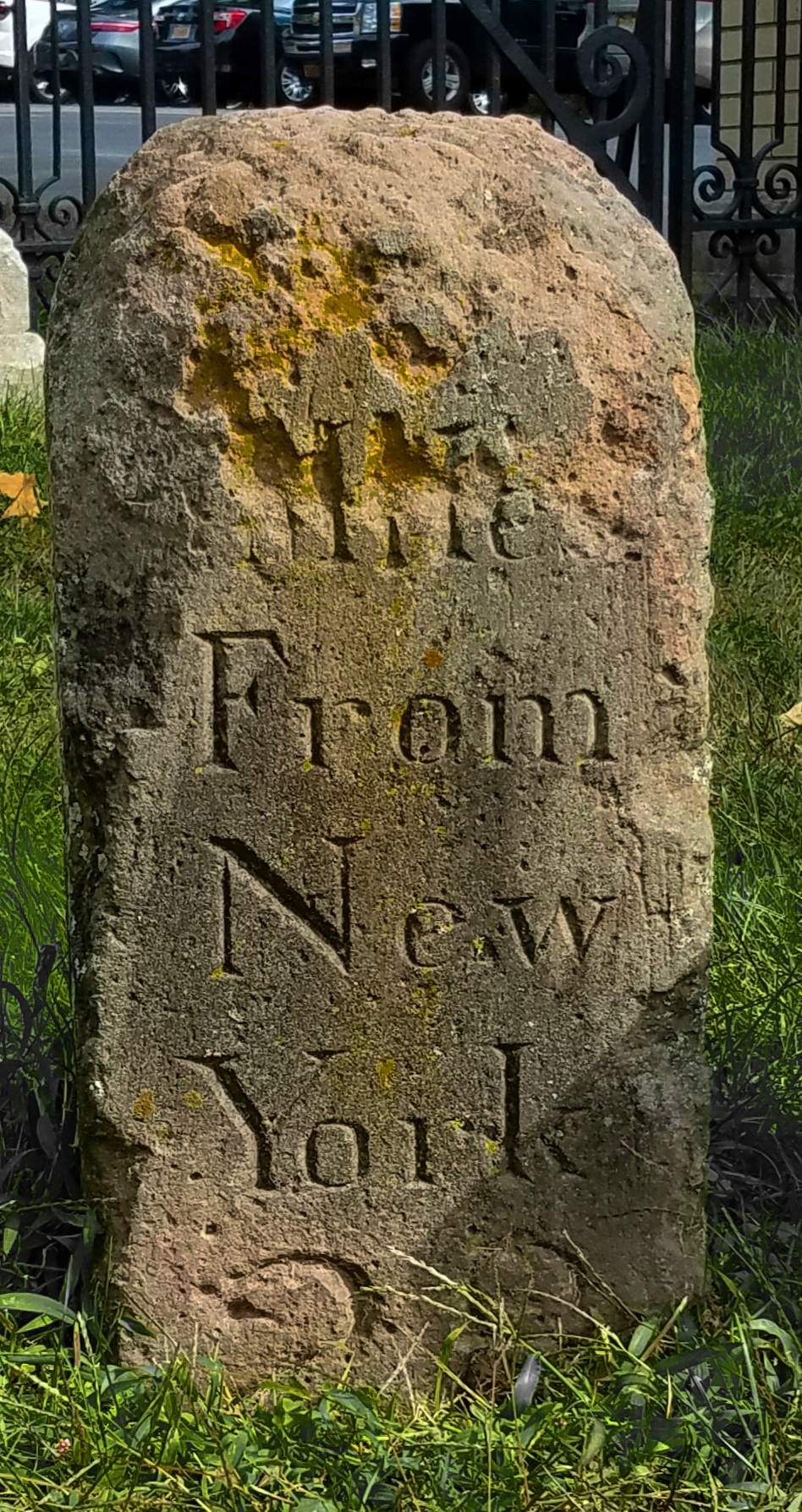
Milestone near the Old Dutch Church of Sleepy Hollow reads: "Miles from New York 28." (Note: It is debated if this milestone is in its original location or was moved there in the 19th century from a place somewhat to the south. Most surviving 18th-century mile markers on the historic Albany Post Road, except for those in the Philipstown area, are not in their original locations; at some point in their history, they were moved to protected settings, such as the grounds of neighboring historic sites, or embedded in retaining walls.) Milestones were placed along the Albany Post Road to assist travelers with navigation and to help calculate postage delivery fees.

Just north of Washington Irving's Sunnyside is the Old Dutch Church of Sleepy Hollow featured in his "The Legend of Sleepy Hollow" (1820). Running concurrent with U.S. Route 9, the Albany Post Road drops the name "Broadway" as it approaches the village of Ossining. In early autumn 1777, General Israel Putnam retired along the Post Road in the face of Sir Henry Clinton's advance on Peekskill.

The rough route was as follows:

- US 9, New York to Ossining (split from the Boston Post Road in Kingsbridge)
- Old Albany Post Road and New York State Route 9A (NY 9A), Ossining to Peekskill
- Sprout Brook Road and Old Albany Post Road, Peekskill to near Nelsonville
- US 9, near Nelsonville to Wappingers Falls
- Main Street and NY 9D through Wappingers Falls
- US 9, Wappingers Falls to Poughkeepsie
- South Avenue and Washington Street (partly NY 9G) through Poughkeepsie
- US 9, Poughkeepsie to Humphreysville [mid-way between Livingston and Claverack].
- NY 9H and Hudson Street, Humphreysville to Kinderhook
- Albany Avenue, Old Post Road, US 9 and Old Post Road, Kinderhook to Schodack Center, where it met the road from Boston to Albany
- US 9/US 20, Schodack Center to Greenbush, ending at "the ferry at Crawlier"

Minor old alignments exist all along the current through route.

== See also ==
- Boston Post Road
- Broadway (Manhattan)
