= Old Albany Post Road =

Oldest dirt road in the United States

- U.S. National Register of Historic Places
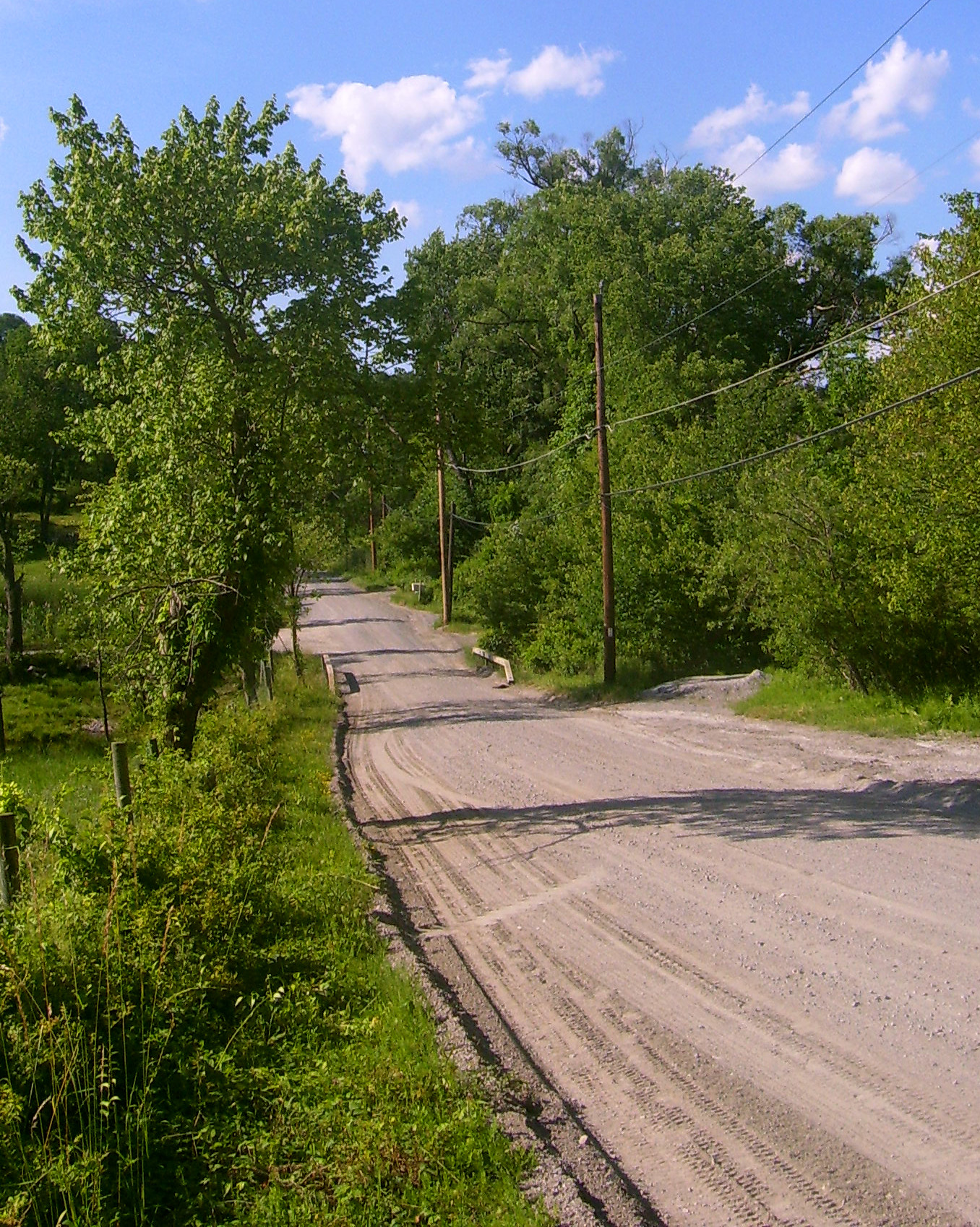
- View north along road near Travis Corners, 2008
- Location: Philipstown, NY
- Nearest city: Peekskill
- Coordinates: 41°22′31″N 73°53′50″W
- Area: 6.6 miles (10.6 km) in length
- Built: 1669-1798
- MPS: Hudson Highlands MRA
- NRHP reference No.: 82003396
- Added to NRHP: 1982

Old Albany Post Road is a 6.6-mile (10.6 km) dirt road in Philipstown, New York, one of the oldest unpaved roads still in use in the United States. It runs mostly north-south through the southeastern corner of the town, near the Putnam Valley town line. Starting from an intersection with Sprout Brook Road at Continental Village just north of the Putnam-Westchester county line, it ends at an oblique junction with US 9 east of Garrison.

As the least improved section of the original Albany Post Road, it was added to the National Register of Historic Places (NRHP) in 1982. Its history as a formal road dates to the mid-17th century, when it was built on established Native American trails. Later it would see military use, particularly by the Continental Army during the Revolution, and commercial use as part of a stagecoach route. Some of the milestones placed during the early years of American independence to more accurately calculate postal rates are still present and have been preserved and restored. It is still in public use and maintained by the town. The town has recently angered some of the residents by proposing to pave the road.

== Route ==
Old Albany Post Road passes through heavily wooded and lightly populated country along the southeastern edge of the Hudson Highlands. Houses, many on large lots, are the only development along the road, and there are no settlements along its length. The countryside is rugged, with the road going up and down several hills. Some areas are scenic, with meadows and views of the nearby hills and mountains.

It branches off to the northwest at the point where Gallows Hill Road becomes Sprout Brook Road. From there it takes a west-northwestward, meandering course at first, narrowing almost to one lane at some points and climbing steadily to where the Catskill Aqueduct crosses, but soon bends to the north-northeast and widens. It climbs and then descends over the next two miles (3 km) to the Lake Celeste area, where it becomes more northerly. Then it bends to the northeast again, going up and down several hills through mostly undeveloped areas, to Chapman Road, where the Appalachian Trail crosses.

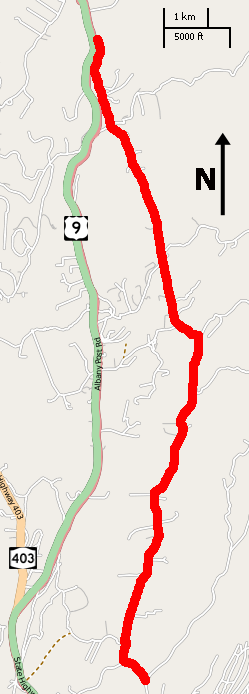
Old Albany Post Road, in red

Out of that intersection it resumes its northward course, traversing around Fort Defiance Mountain, to Canopus Hill Road. There it turns to the northwest. At the corner of Travis Corners Road, a monument explains the historical importance of the road. From here it runs almost straight north-northwest past some farms and more open land to cross Philipse Brook at the junction with Philipse Brook Road.

Beyond, the road remains mostly straight and northwestward, eventually returning to more wooded country along a ridgetop where the southwestern corner of Clarence Fahnestock State Park is nearby. It then turns more to the west and descends to the intersection with Indian Brook Road, near the Bird and Bottle Inn. From here it parallels nearby Route 9, reaching some more developed areas until it finally ends with a merge onto the highway.

== History ==
All of the major work of building and widening the road was done during the colonial era. Old Albany Post Road has not seen much change since the mid-18th century. Later improvements in transportation technology diverted traffic away from it and have helped to preserve the road in its historic form.

=== Colonial era ===
According to the National Register of Historic Places nomination for the road, in 1669 the government of New Amsterdam designated a postal route between it and Fort Orange (today's New York City and Albany), the colony's two most important cities at the time. It was little more than a narrow path in many places, following old trails used by the Wiccopee band of the Wappinger tribe, who often carried the mail, starting two years later. The longest stretch included part of the current Old Albany Post Road. The colony eventually became the English Province of New York, and in 1703 its legislative body provided for the postal road to be a "public and common general highway" along the same route, starting in Kingsbridge in today's Bronx directly across from the northern tip of Manhattan, and ending at a ferry landing in present-day Rensselaer. That legislation authorized the road to be as much as four rods (66 feet (20 m)) wide where necessary. It was called the Queen's Road at first, after then-Queen Anne, and later the King's Road when she was succeeded by George I and II.

As it became the main route between the two cities, local commerce began to serve the long-distance travelers. Inns are recorded along the road as early as the 1730s, when it was first widened for military use. The best-known, John Warren's Tavern, was built in 1756 and remains in use today as the Bird and Bottle Inn restaurant at the junction with Indian Brook Road.

The road received major improvements when the British Army realized it needed to improve defenses against the French to the north in New France (today's Quebec). In 1754, it was widened again and trees were cleared to allow the transport of troops and materiel in greater numbers. Milestones were first known to have been placed in 1763, sometime after Benjamin Franklin, who had advocated their use, was appointed the colonies' Joint Postmaster General.

After the French and Indian War, it would be used against the British by George Washington's Continental Army during the Revolutionary War. He retreated to what was named Continental Village after the Battle of White Plains and the road remained fortified and defended throughout the war, used as a supply route, and often traveled by Washington and his officers. It was surveyed during the war and the first map published. Its milestone locations are not the extant ones.

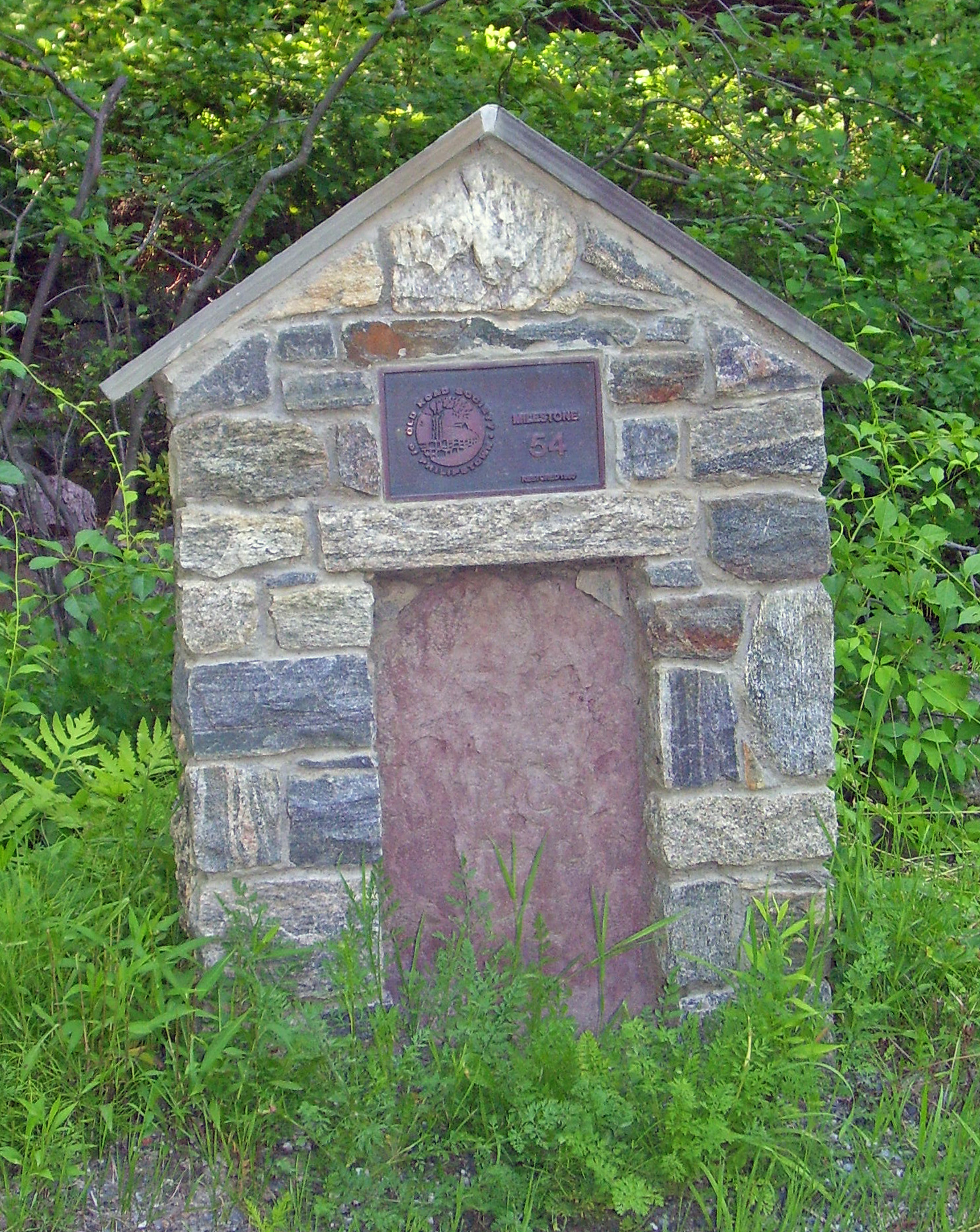
Milestone 54

=== 18th and 19th centuries ===
After the war, the new state began making further use of the road. A regular stagecoach route was chartered along the road by the legislature in 1785, and the mileposts were upgraded by the end of the century. By then a regular mail route was in place, with riders going up the east side of the river and down another road on the west side on a weekly basis.

In 1789 a new survey was taken and the old maps revised. These match today's known milestone locations along the entire former length of the road. A decade later, New York's Act to Regulate the Highways directed every county highway superintendent to place stone mile markers along the road. By the next year all the remaining mileposts had been placed.

A private company built the Highlands Turnpike to the west, in more level country, which opened in 1806. This diverted traffic away from the section north of Peekskill through Continental Village and past the lakes. Iron mining at Hopper Lake in the 1820s partially replaced it, and the stage route was not changed. The old road fell into further disuse when the turnpike became a public highway in 1833 and it was no longer needed as a shunpike. The completion of the Hudson River Railroad to Albany in 1850 made the road obsolete as a commercial and postal artery, and stage service ended.

=== 20th and 21st centuries ===
Old Albany Post Road briefly assumed more than local importance once more in the 1910s, when the New York City water supply system was expanded to bring water to the city from Ashokan Reservoir in the Catskills. The road provided access to a section of the Catskill Aqueduct, and shops, housing and bars were built along it to shelter and serve the construction workers. A decade later, Highlands Turnpike, by then the main north-south route through the county, was paved and formally designated as Route 9.

In 1921, a monument to the "Mothers of the Revolution" was placed at the southern end. Homes and farms along the road were electrified in 1935 due to the efforts of the newly created Rural Electrification Administration, adding utility poles to the landscape. A portion of the road near Travis Corners was surfaced in tar and gravel in the 20th century. Beyond that, it remains as it was in the mid-18th century. Following its NRHP listing, a group called the Old Road Society of Philipstown (ORSP) was formed to help preserve and promote it. Its membership is open to residents along the road and intersecting dirt roads.

The town has, in recent years, raised the possibility of paving it, saying it would be cheaper to maintain and silts up a paralleling brook through erosion. This has divided residents along Old Albany Post Road. Opponents point to its historic designation, character and rural charm, which would be lost if it were surfaced. Proponents, many near the road's southern end, cite public safety concerns such as inaccessibility for police and fire vehicles during washouts in heavy storms like the April 2007 Nor'easter, which left craters four feet (1.3 m) deep in front of some driveways. The Federal Emergency Management Agency has given the town a grant to repair it, although it has not been decided whether it will be used for pavement or not.

In November 2012, a local newspaper Philipstown.Info (now The Highlands Current) revealed that the Town of Philipstown budget contained proposed expenditures for paving sections of the town's historic dirt roads including 5300 feet of Old Albany Post Road in 2013-14 and an additional 7580 feet to be paved within 5 years. Until the paper revealed this information, residents of the road were unaware of the town's grand plans. The Philipstown Board cited three reasons for paving; the cost of maintaining dirt roads are too expensive, degradation of water quality in nearby streams, and safety. If this plan were undertaken the Old Albany Post Road would lose almost 2.5 miles of historic road. Sections that the town wants to pave include two important historic areas; Saunders Farm and the hill that runs north to the famous revolutionary era Bird and Bottle Inn. There is considerable opposition to paving by local residents and a contentious town board workshop was held for Philipstown residents on January 16, 2013. Those in opposition to paving cite the historic, aesthetic, cultural, and recreational importance of leaving the road untouched. Many residents and an expert engineer presented information documenting that sound dirt road maintenance practices have not been utilized by the Town of Philipstown and if they were adopted would lead to cost savings, improvement in water quality, and thus preserve the historic nature of the road. Additionally other dirt road residents pointed out that drivers on dirt roads travel at significantly lower speeds reducing mortality in pedestrian vehicle accidents. It was also pointed out that the Town of Philipstown could be in violation of state bonding laws if they were to pave as proposed with merely a thin coat of asphalt and no substructure preparation. The paving ultimately never occurred. Following the paving controversy, in 2014 it was listed on the Preservation League of New York State's "Seven to Save" list of endangered historic sites.

== Contributing historic resources ==
The entire 66-foot (20 m) right-of-way authorized in 1703 is included in the NRHP listing. This means that many other aspects of the structure, like the adjacent stone walls and shade trees, are considered contributing resources to the designation. The milestones are all included, even number 52, which is actually located on Gallows Hill Road slightly to the south of the fork at Sprout Hill.

Some of the buildings along the road have been noted for their historic value by the ORSP. The Bird and Bottle Inn is a contributing property to the Indian Brook Road Historic District, which itself includes part of the road as one of its contributing properties. In the two-mile (3.2 km) section to its south there is also a Civil War-era farmhouse and a 1770s inn, both of which have seen more recent additions. Opposite Lake Celeste is Pine Run Farm, which dates to 1800.
