= 2025 deaths in the United States (January–March) =

- Decades: 2000s; 2010s; 2020s; 2030s
- See also: History of the United States (2016–present); Timeline of United States history (2010–present); List of years in the United States

The following notable deaths in the United States occurred in January–March 2025. Names are reported under the date of death, in alphabetical order as set out in WP:NAMESORT. A typical entry reports information in the following sequence: Name, age, country of citizenship at birth and subsequent nationality (if applicable), what subject was noted for, year of birth (if known), and reference.

== January ==
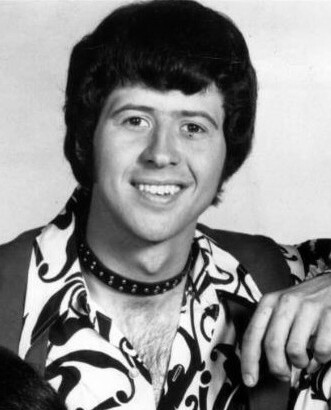
Wayne Osmond

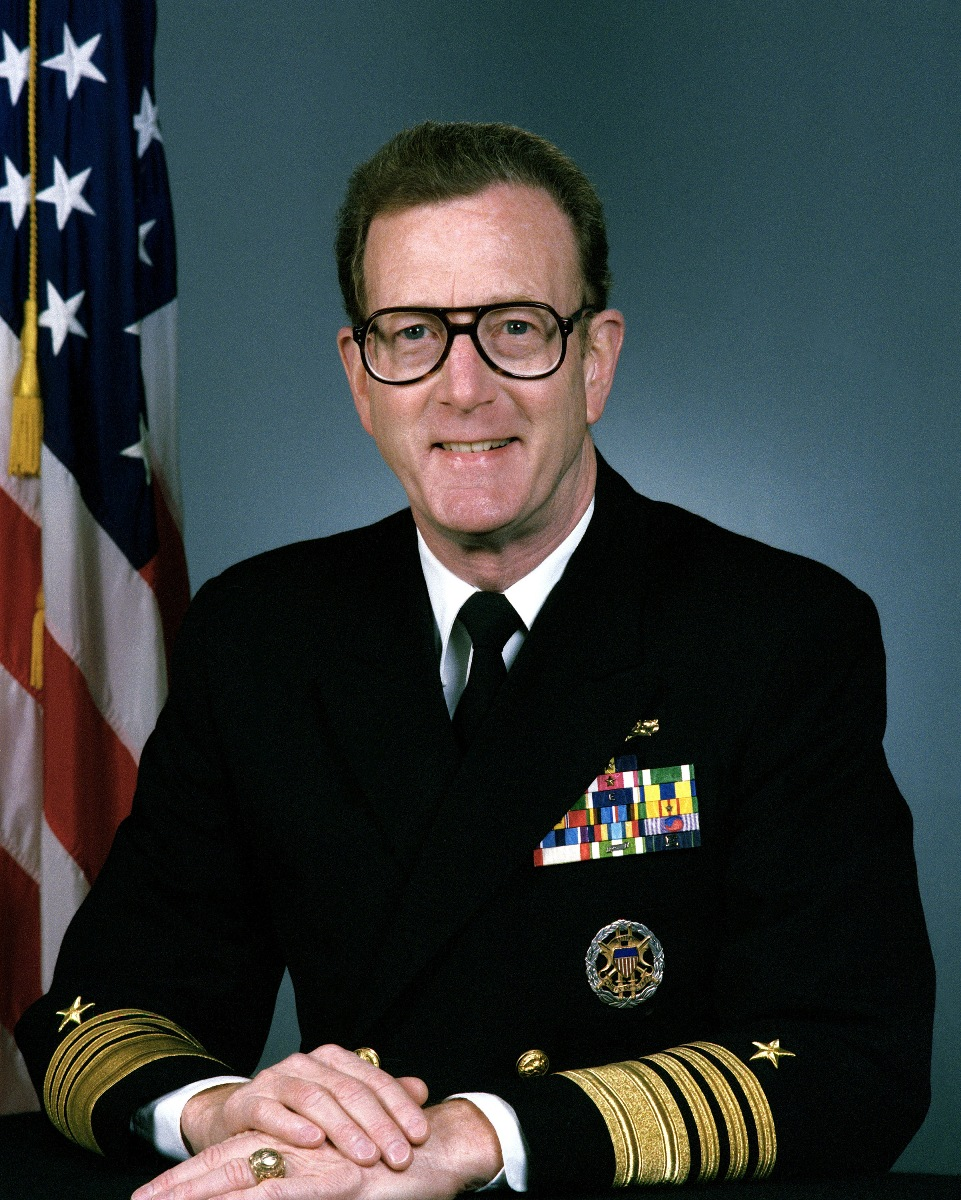
James R. Hogg

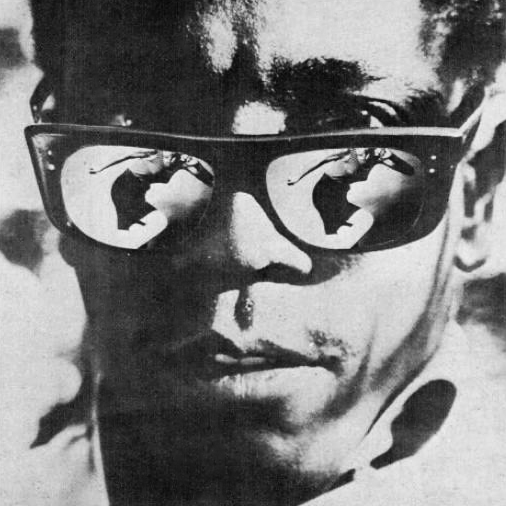
Brenton Wood

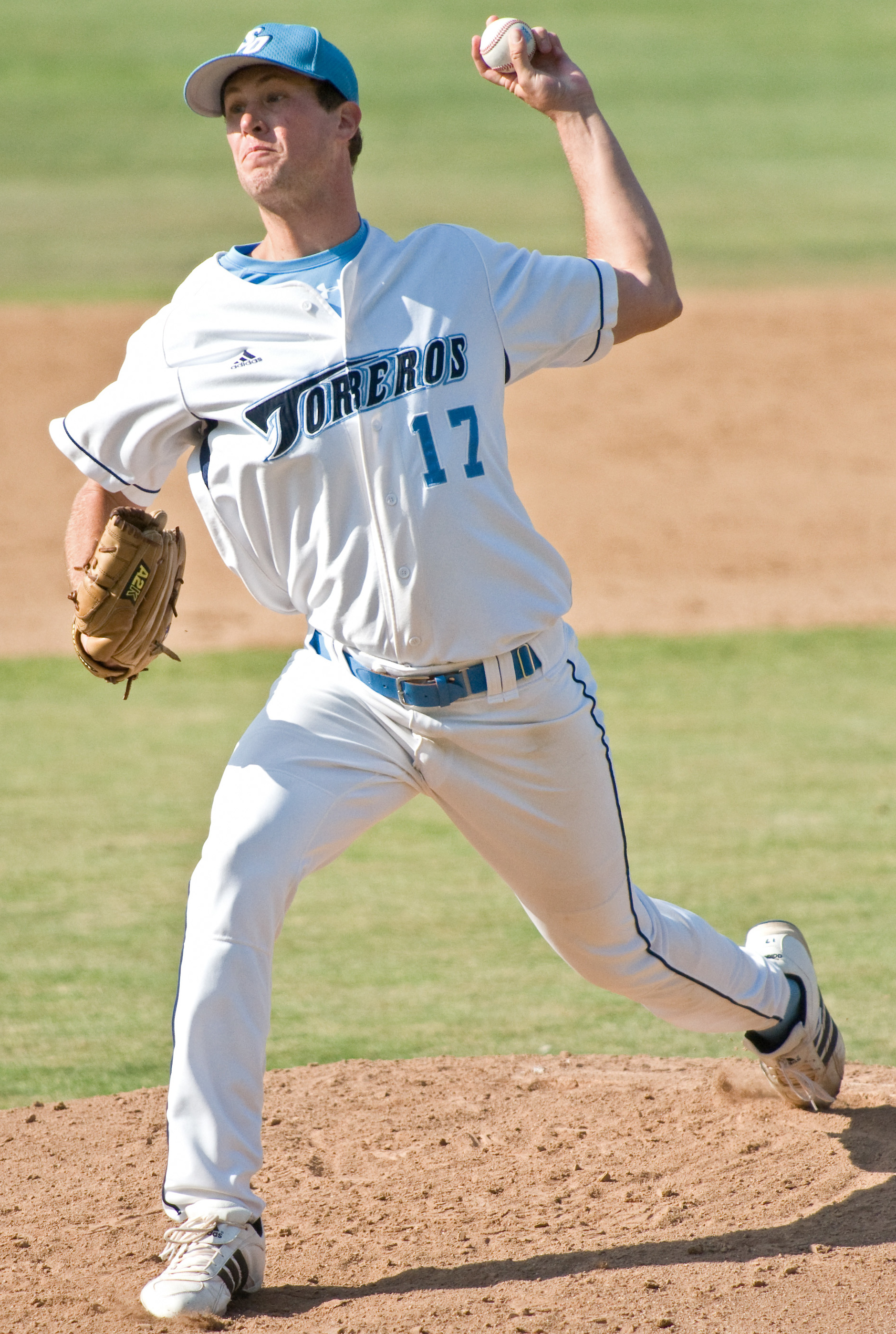
Brian Matusz

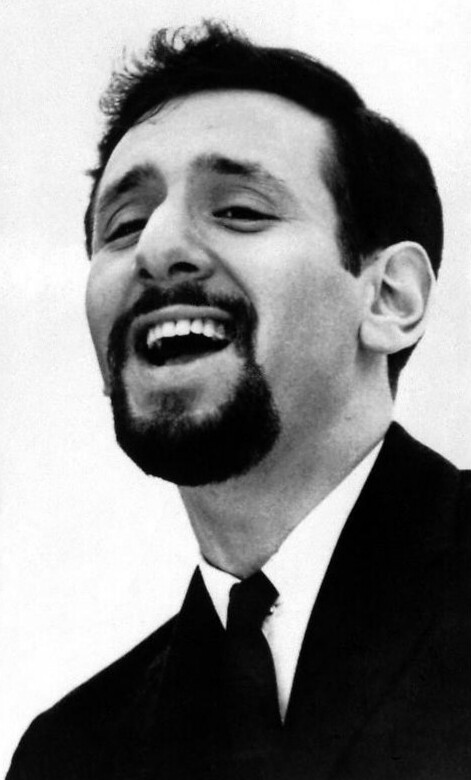
Peter Yarrow

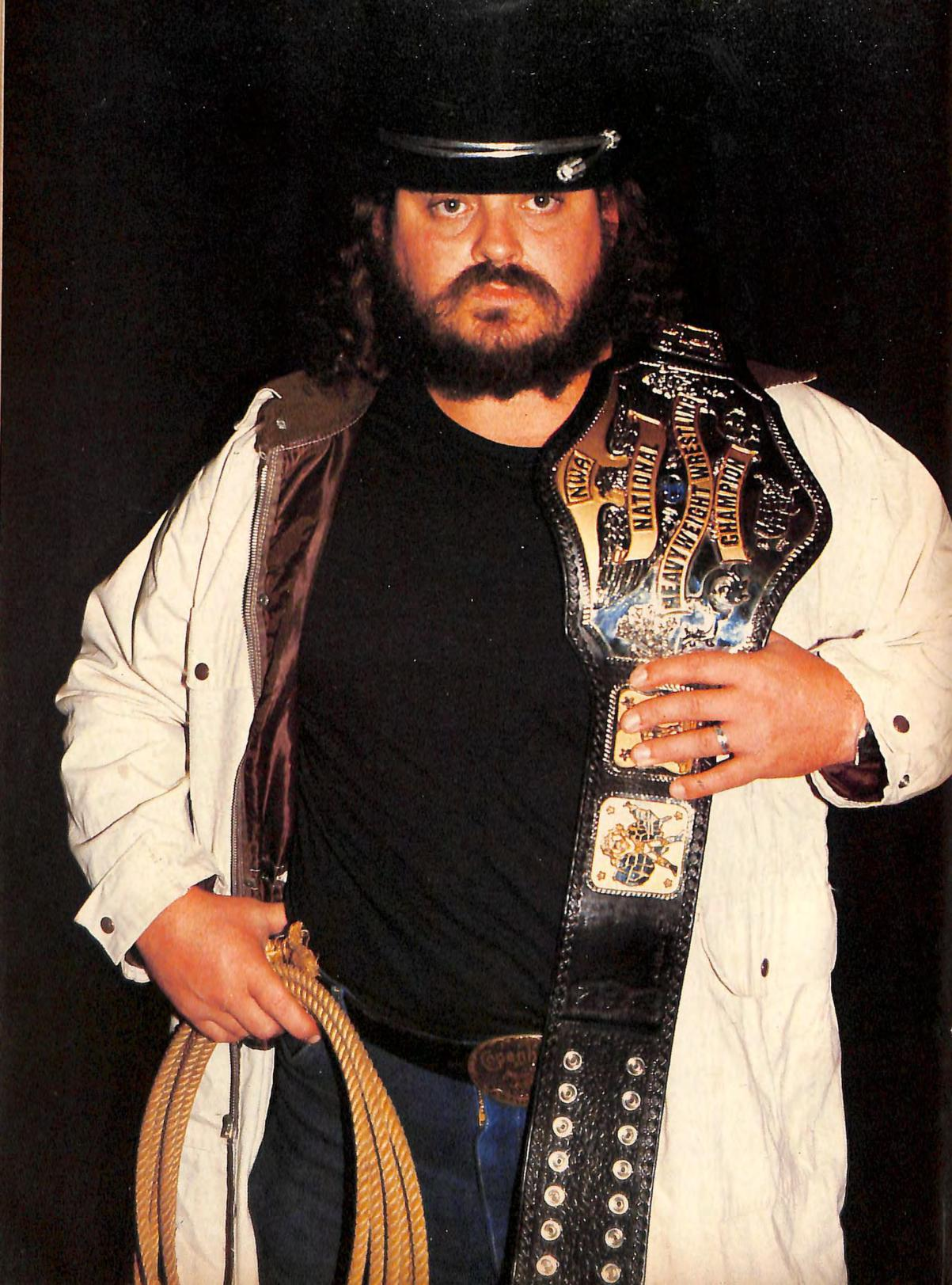
Black Bart

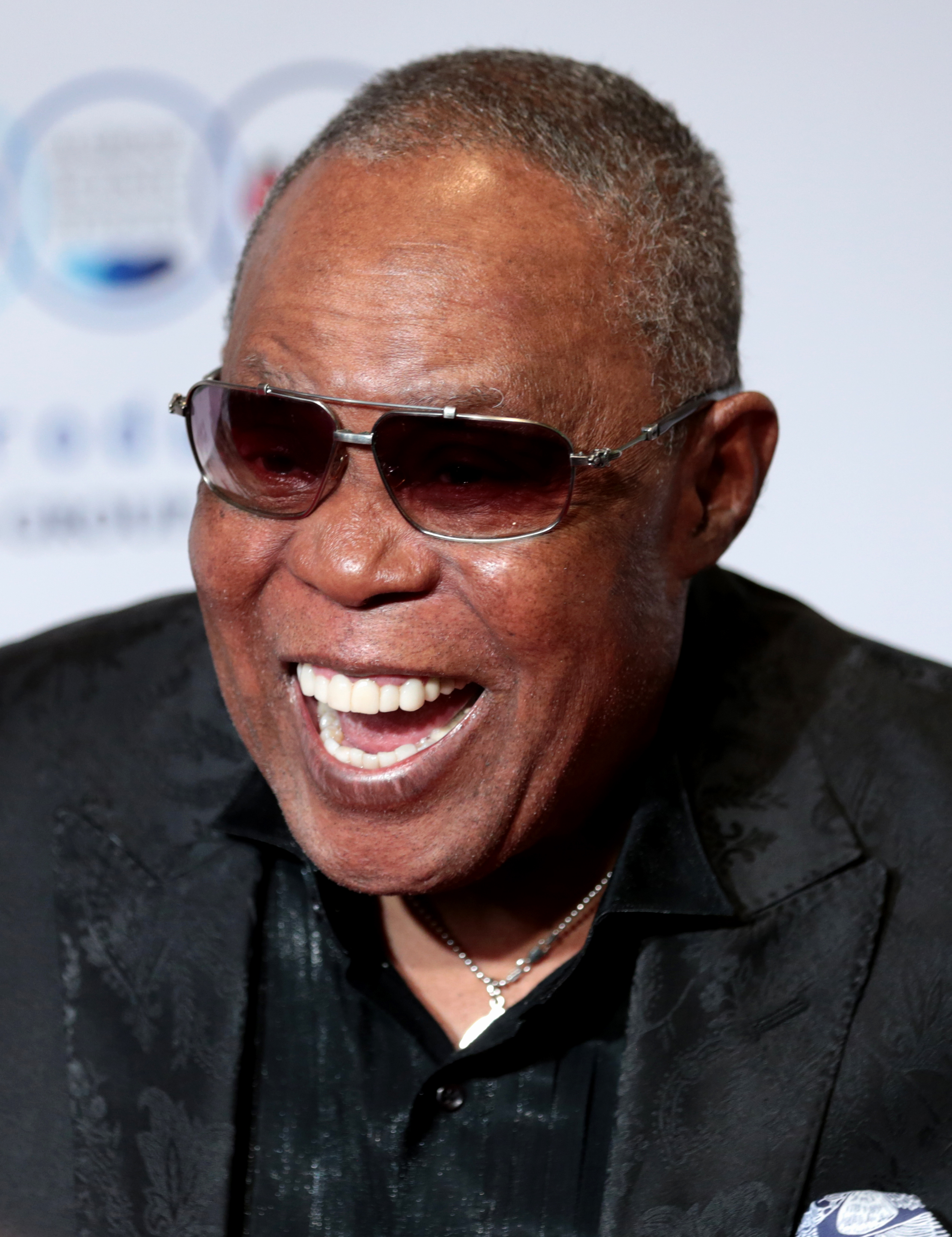
Sam Moore

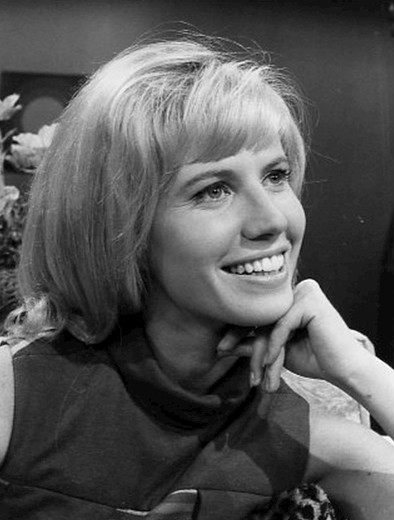
Leslie Charleson

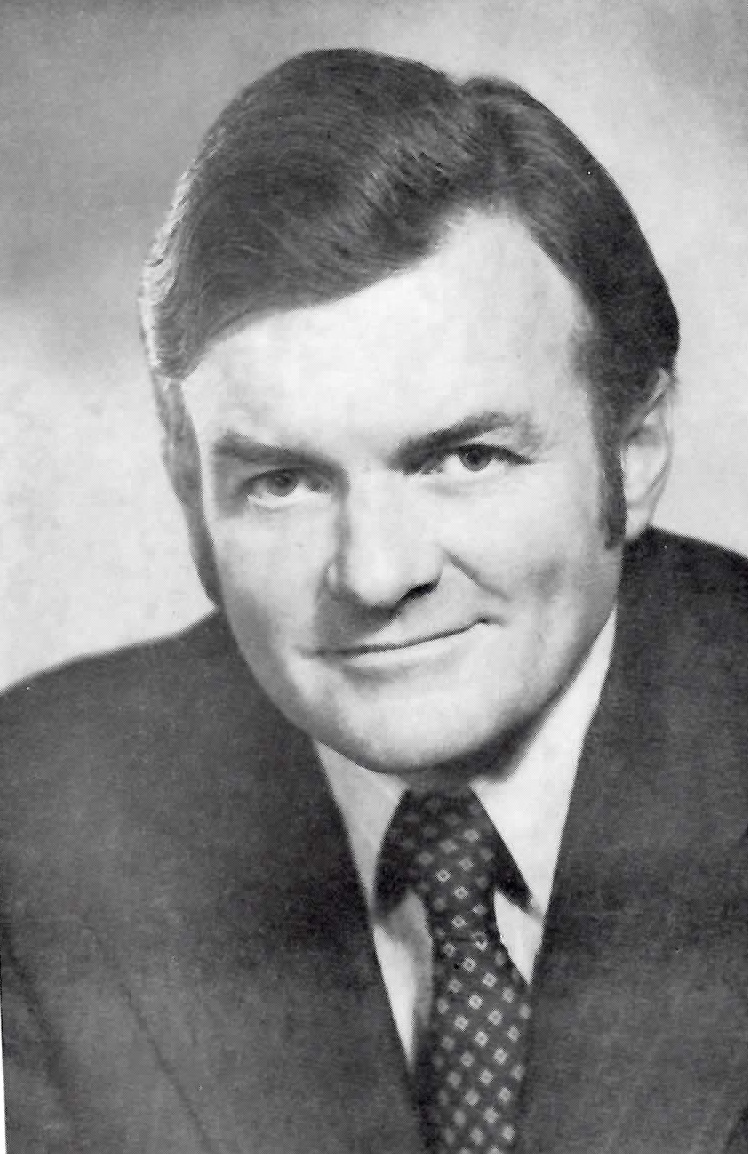
Thomas P. Salmon

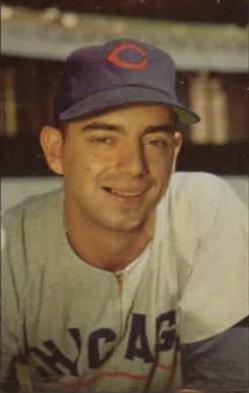
Tommy Brown

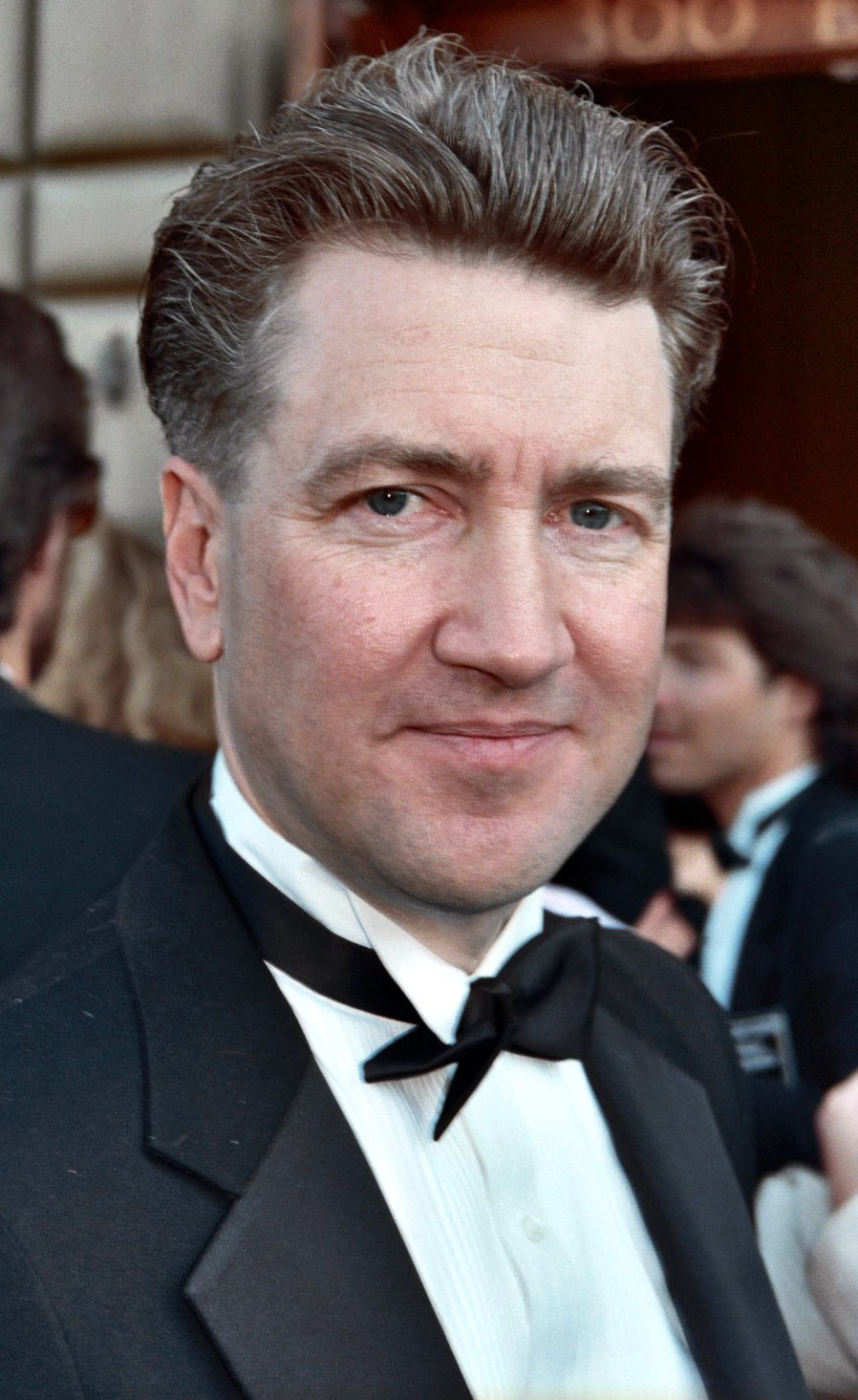
David Lynch

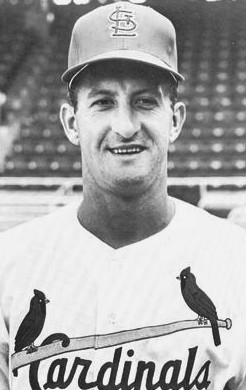
Bob Uecker

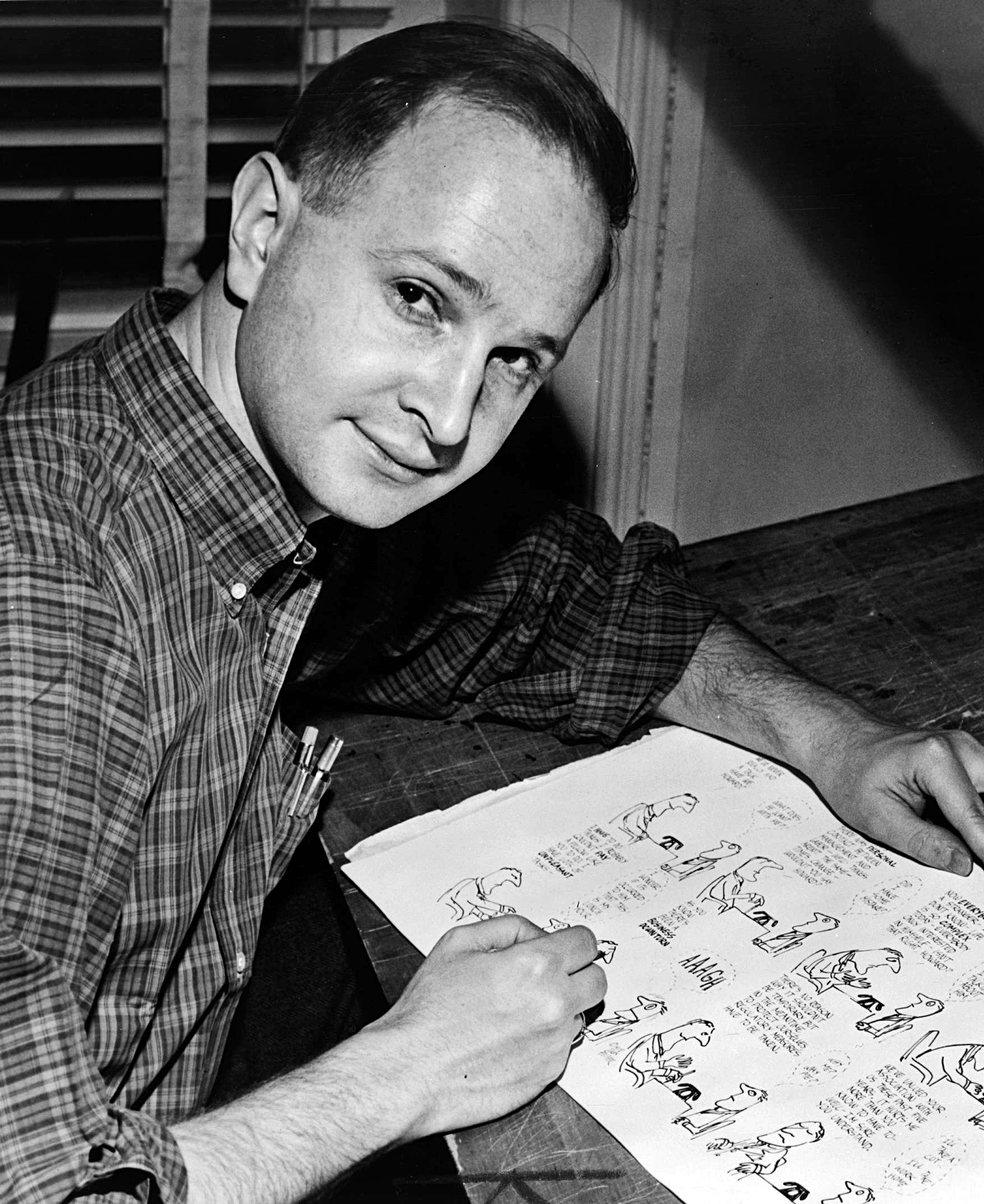
Jules Feiffer

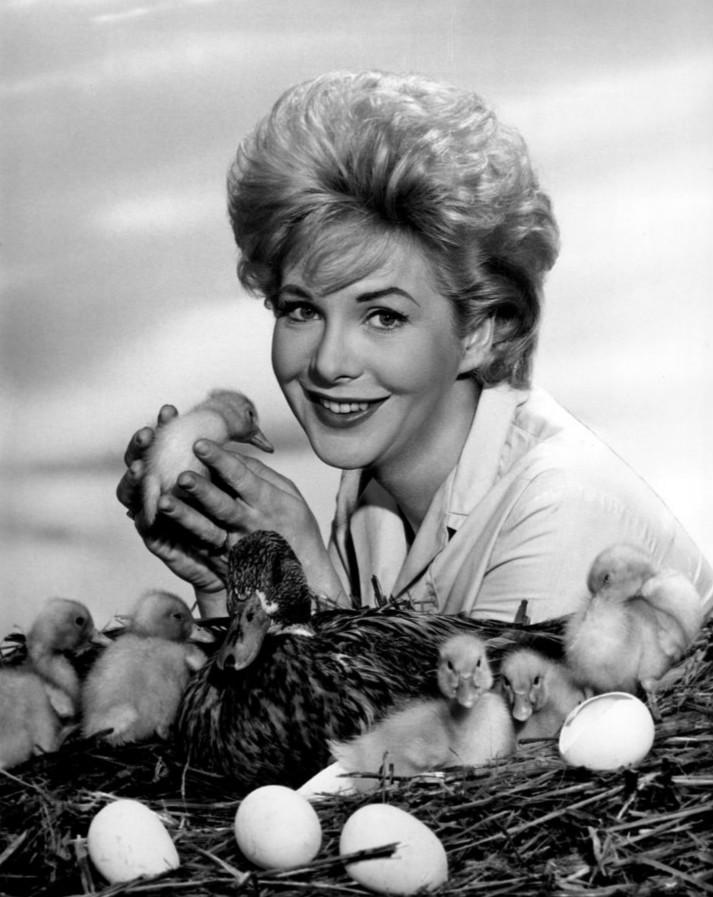
Jan Shepard

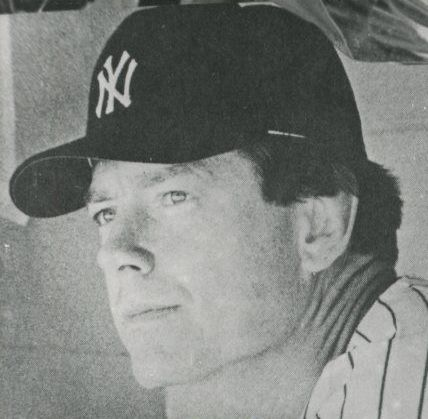
Jeff Torborg

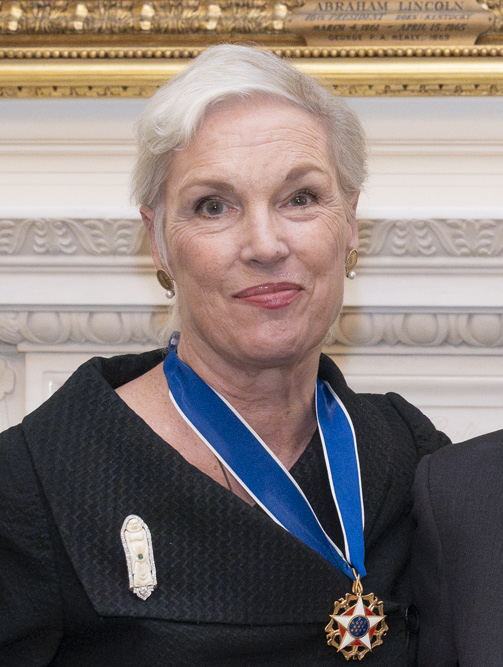
Cecile Richards

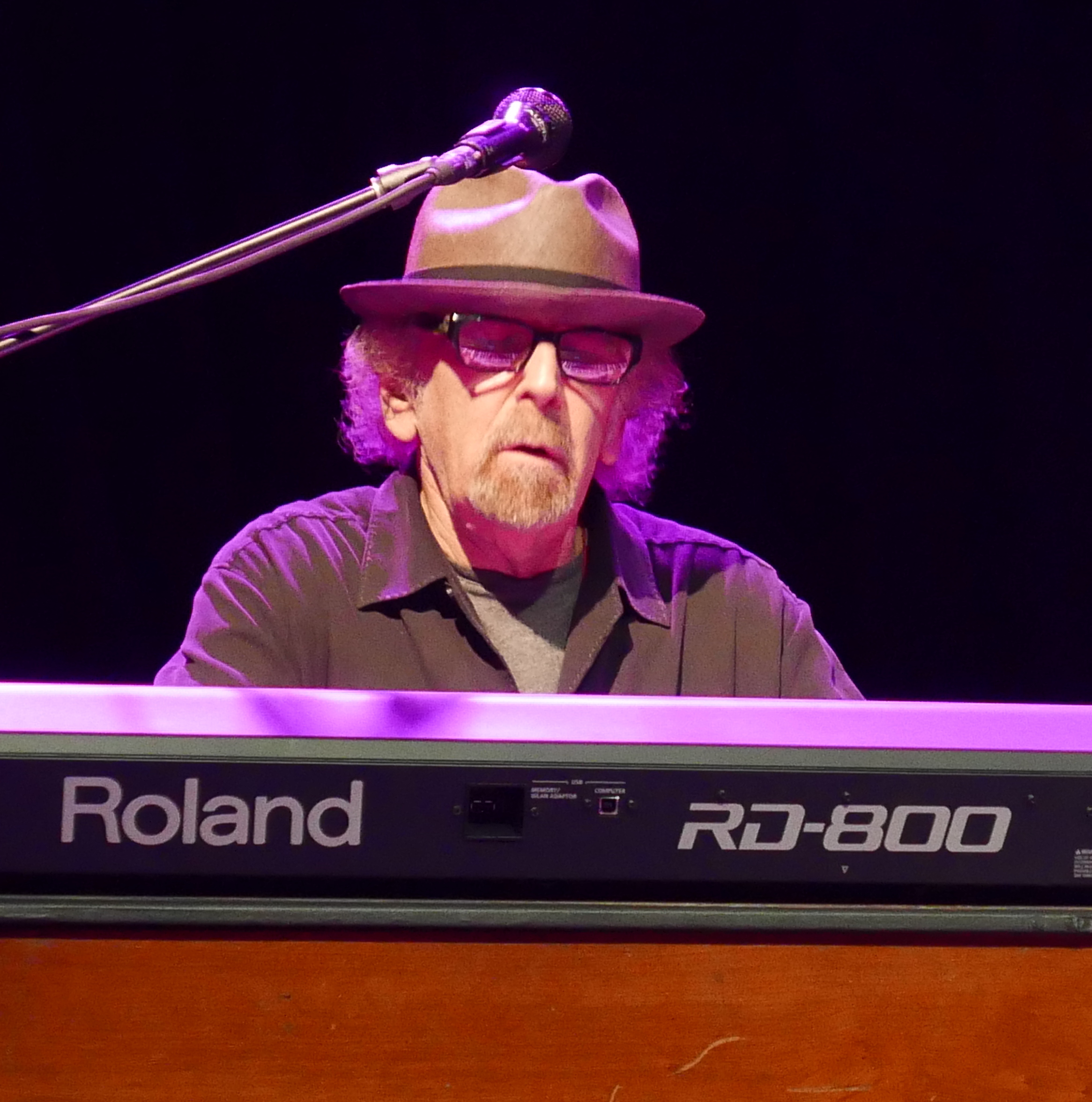
Barry Goldberg

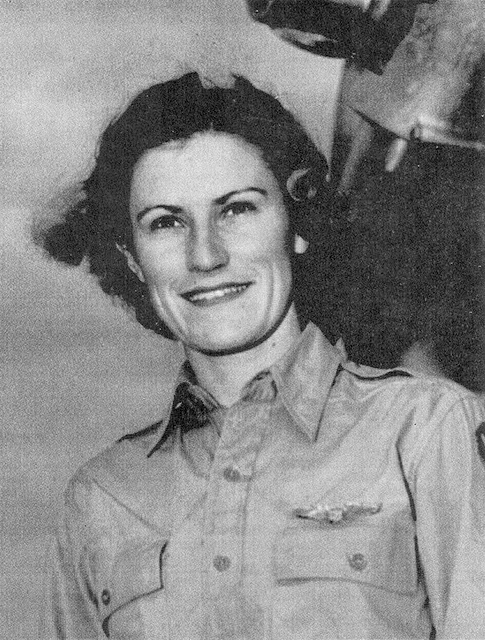
Iris Cummings

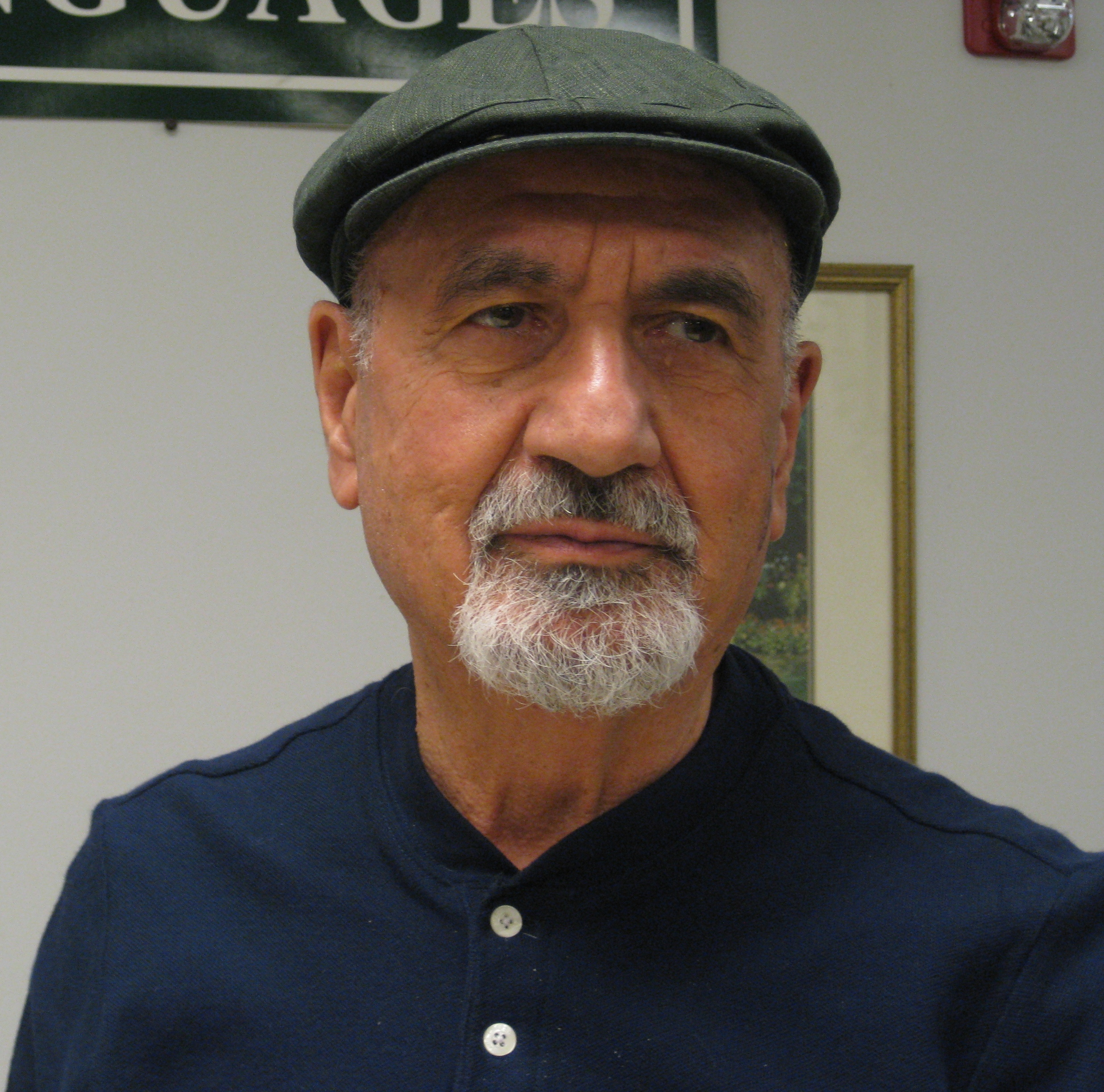
Mahmoud Saeed

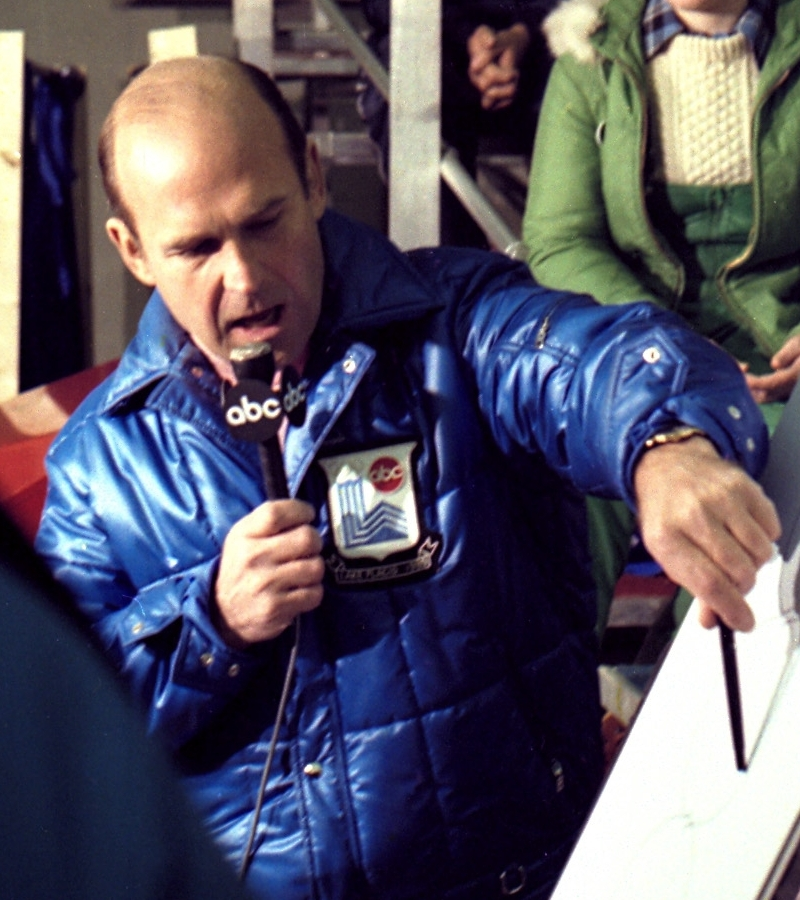
Dick Button

- January 1
  - William Carter, 90, photographer (b. 1934)
  - Henry P. Monaghan, 90, legal scholar (b. 1934)
  - Joseph Monninger, 71, novelist (The Letters) (b. 1953)
  - John B. O'Reilly Jr., 76, politician, mayor of Dearborn, Michigan (2007–2022) (b. 1948)
  - Wayne Osmond, 73, singer (The Osmonds) (b. 1951)
  - Nelson Pryor, 82, politician, member of the New Hampshire House of Representatives (1972–1974) (b. 1942)
  - Ripken, 8, retrieval dog (b. 2016)
- January 2
  - Mary Abrams, 66, politician, member of the Connecticut State Senate (2019–2023) (b. 1958)
  - Brian Berry, 90, British-born human geographer and planner (b. 1934)
  - Mark Bradley, 68, baseball player (Los Angeles Dodgers, New York Mets) (b. 1956) (death announced on this date)
  - James R. Hogg, 90, admiral (b. 1934)
  - Derek Humphry, 94, British-born assisted suicide activist (Jean's Way, Final Exit), co-founder of Final Exit Network (b. 1930)
  - Seymour P. Lachman, 91, political historian and politician, member of the New York State Senate (1996–2004) (b. 1933)
  - Larry Kish, 83, ice hockey coach (Hartford Whalers) (b. 1941)
  - Ralph Mann, 75, Hall of Fame sprinter and hurdler, Olympic silver medalist (1972) (b. 1949)
- January 3
  - Jeff Baena, 47, film director and screenwriter (The Little Hours, Horse Girl, Spin Me Round) (b. 1977)
  - Morris Bradshaw, 72, football player (Oakland Raiders) (b. 1952) (death announced on this date)
  - Howard Buten, 74, author and clown (b. 1950)
  - Richard B. Hays, 76, theologian (b. 1948)
  - William Leo Higi, 91, Roman Catholic prelate, bishop of Lafayette (1984–2010) (b. 1933)
  - Harvey Laidman, 82, television director (Matlock, 7th Heaven, The Waltons) (b. 1942)
  - Robert Loewy, 98, aerospace engineer (b. 1926)
  - Constantine Manos, 90, Greek-born photographer (b. 1934)
  - James Arthur Ray, 67, self-help businessman, author and convicted felon (b. 1957)
  - Bob Veale, 89, baseball player (Pittsburgh Pirates, Boston Red Sox) (b. 1935) (death announced on this date)
  - Brenton Wood, 83, singer ("The Oogum Boogum Song", "Gimme Little Sign") (b. 1941)
  - Amit Yoran, 54, businessman, CEO of Tenable, Inc. (2017–2024) (b. 1970)
- January 4
  - Ed Askew, 84, painter and singer-songwriter (b. 1940)
  - Frank Blackwell, 77, politician, member of the West Virginia House of Delegates (1976–1982, 2016) (b. 1947)
  - Daniel J. Brass, 77, organizational theorist (b. 1948)
  - Ben Espy, 81, politician, member of the Ohio Senate (1992–2002) (b. 1943)
  - Richard Foreman, 87, playwright (Rhoda in Potatoland) (b. 1937)
  - Barry Kramer, 82, basketball player (San Francisco Warriors, New York Knicks) and jurist, judge of the New York State Supreme Court (2009–2012) (b. 1942)
  - Dylan Thomas More, musician (Chemlab).
  - Shirah Neiman, 81, prosecutor (b. 1943)
  - Karen Pryor, 92, behavioral psychologist and author (b. 1932)
  - Robert Sedler, 89, legal scholar (b. 1935)
- January 5
  - Beej Chaney, 68, guitarist (The Suburbs) (b. 1956/1957)
  - Olga Marlin, 90, American-born Kenyan educator and writer (b. 1934)
  - Raquel Rabinovich, 95, Argentine-born artist (b. 1929)
  - Mike Rinder, 69, Australian-born Scientology executive and writer (A Billion Years) (b. 1955)
  - Jim Short, 58, Australian-born comedian (b. 1967)
- January 6
  - Hope Foye, 103, folk singer (b. 1921)
  - John Granara, 81, politician, member of the Massachusetts House of Representatives (1977–1979) (b. 1943)
  - Brian Matusz, 37, baseball player (Baltimore Orioles, Chicago Cubs) (b. 1987)
  - Charles M. Roessel, 63, Navajo photographer, journalist and academic administrator, president of Diné College (since 2017) (b. 1961)
  - Jim Wetherington, 87, politician, mayor of Columbus, Georgia (2007–2011) (b. 1937)
  - Robert Paul Wolff, 91, political philosopher (In Defense of Anarchism, A Critique of Pure Tolerance) (b. 1933)
  - Edgar Maddison Welch, 36, criminal (b. 1988)
- January 7
  - Carolyn Brown, 97, dancer, choreographer and writer (b. 1927)
  - Neal McCaleb, 89, politician, member of the Oklahoma House of Representatives (1975–1983) (b. 1935)
  - Betty C. Monkman, 82, curator and author, White House curator (1997–2002) (b. 1942)
  - Leo Segedin, 97, painter (b. 1927)
  - Derrick Ward, 62, journalist (WRC-TV) (b. 1962)
  - Peter Yarrow, 86, singer (Peter, Paul and Mary, "Leaving on a Jet Plane") and songwriter ("Puff, the Magic Dragon") (b. 1938)
- January 8
  - William P. Dixon, 81, lawyer and political strategist, U.S. alternate director of the World Bank (1977–1979), manager of the 1980 Democratic National Convention (b. 1943)
  - Alan Emrich, 65, writer and game designer (b. 1959) (death announced on this date)
  - Nancy Leftenant-Colon, 104, nurse (b. 1920)
  - Charles Person, 82, civil rights activist (Freedom Rides) (b. 1942)
  - Neil Zurcher, 89, journalist (WJW-TV) and television host (b. 1935)
- January 9
  - Black Bart, 76, professional wrestler (NWA) (b. 1948)
  - Bill Byrge, 92, actor (Ernest Saves Christmas, Ernest Goes to Jail, Ernest Scared Stupid) and comedian (b. 1932)
  - Tom Osthoff, 88, politician, member of the Minnesota House of Representatives (1983–2003) (b. 1936)
- January 10
  - José Jiménez, 76, Puerto Rican-born political activist, founder of the Young Lords (b. 1948)
  - Bill McCartney, 84, Hall of Fame football coach (Colorado Buffaloes) (b. 1940)
  - Sam Moore, 89, singer (Sam & Dave) (b. 1935)
  - Kenneth E. Scott, 96, politician, member of the Minnesota House of Representatives (1963–1967) (b. 1928)
- January 11
  - Beryl Anthony Jr., 86, lawyer and politician, member of the U.S. House of Representatives (1979–1993) (b. 1938)
  - Linda Burnes Bolton, 76, healthcare administrator (b. 1948)
  - Marty DeMerritt, 71, baseball player and coach (San Francisco Giants, Chicago Cubs) (b. 1953)
  - Merle Louise, 90, actress (Sweeney Todd: The Demon Barber of Fleet Street, Into the Woods, Gypsy) (b. 1934)
  - James McEachin, 94, actor (Coogan's Bluff, Play Misty for Me, Every Which Way but Loose) (b. 1930)
  - Peter J. Messitte, 83, jurist, judge of the U.S. District Court for Maryland (since 1993) (b. 1941)
  - Joel Paley, 69, theatre director, lyricist and playwright (Ruthless!) (b. 1955)
- January 12
  - Leslie Charleson, 79, actress (General Hospital, Love Is a Many-Splendored Thing, The Day of the Dolphin) (b. 1945)
  - Jackie Farry, 58, music manager and television host (Superock) (b. 1966)
  - Mark Izu, 70, jazz double bass player and composer (b. 1954)
  - Claude Jarman Jr., 90, actor (The Yearling, Intruder in the Dust, Rio Grande) (b. 1934)
  - Robert Machray, 79, actor (Cheers, Thanks, The Master of Disguise) (b. 1945)
  - Jeffrey A. Meyer, 61, jurist, judge of the U.S. District Court for the District of Connecticut (since 2014) (b. 1963)
  - Stuart Spencer, 97, political strategist (b. 1927)
  - Lynne Taylor-Corbett, 68, choreographer (b. 1956)
- January 13
  - Eliseo Alcon, 74, politician, member of the New Mexico House of Representatives (2009–2024) (b. 1950)
  - Paul Benacerraf, 94, French-born philosopher (Benacerraf's identification problem) (b. 1930)
  - C. Marshall Cain, 90, lawyer and politician, member of the South Carolina House of Representatives (1969–1975, 1979–1981) (b. 1934)
  - Carol Downer, 91, feminist lawyer and author (b. 1933)
  - Nathalie Dupree, 85, cookbook writer and television personality (b. 1939)
  - P. Fluid, 64, rock musician (24-7 Spyz) (b. 1960)
  - Charles E. Jefferson, 79, politician, member of the Illinois House of Representatives (2001–2014) (b. 1945) (death announced on this date)
  - Clark L. Reber, 87, politician, member of the Utah House of Representatives (1983–1987, 1993–1995) (b. 1937)
  - Buck White, 94, musician (The Whites) (b. 1930)
- January 14
  - Arthur Blessitt, 84, Christian preacher (b. 1940)
  - Surat Singh Khalsa, 91, Indian-born political activist (b. 1933)
  - Heinz Kluetmeier, 82, German-born sports photographer (Sports Illustrated) (b. 1942)
  - Jay Mazur, 92, labor leader (b. 1932)
  - Thomas McHugh, 88, jurist, justice of the Supreme Court of Appeals of West Virginia (1981–1997, 2009–2013) (b. 1936)
  - Thomas P. Salmon, 92, politician, governor of Vermont (1973–1977) (b. 1932)
- January 15
  - Tommy Brown, 97, baseball player (Brooklyn Dodgers, Philadelphia Phillies, Chicago Cubs) (b. 1927)
  - Tommy Dix, 101, actor (Best Foot Forward) and singer (b. 1923)
  - David W. Duclon, 74, television writer and producer (Punky Brewster, Silver Spoons, Family Matters) (b. 1950)
  - Jack Hoffman, 19, football player and cancer research advocate (b. 2005)
  - Sylvan Kalib, 95, music theorist and composer (b. 1929)
  - David Lynch, 78, television and film director (Twin Peaks, Blue Velvet, Mulholland Drive), visual artist and musician (b. 1946).
  - Melba Montgomery, 86, country singer ("No Charge", "Don't Let the Good Times Fool You", "Angel of the Morning") and songwriter (b. 1938)
  - Turtel Onli, 72, artist (b. 1952)
  - Doug Shapiro, 65, racing cyclist (b. 1959)
  - Joe Vosoba, 95, politician, member of the Nebraska Legislature (1959–1963) (b. 1929)
  - Gus Williams, 71, basketball player (Golden State Warriors, Seattle SuperSonics) (b. 1953)
- January 16
  - Jack De Mave, 91, actor (Lassie, The Man Without a Face, Days of Our Lives) (b. 1933)
  - Howard Andrew Jones, 56, author and editor (b. 1968)
  - George Kalinsky, 88, photographer (Madison Square Garden, New York Mets) (b. 1936)
  - Paul Mango, 65, healthcare executive and government official (b. 1959)
  - Toby Myers, 75, musician (Roadmaster, John Cougar Mellencamp) (b. 1949)
  - Francisco San Martín, 39, actor (Days of Our Lives, The Bold and the Beautiful, Jane the Virgin) (b. 1985)
  - George A. Tice, 86, photographer (b. 1938)
  - Bob Uecker, 90, baseball player (Milwaukee Braves, St. Louis Cardinals) and broadcaster (Milwaukee Brewers) (b. 1934)
  - Ridley Wills II, 90, author and historian (b. 1934)
- January 17
  - William J. Cox, 103, Episcopalian bishop and figure in Anglican realignment (b. 1921)
  - Jules Feiffer, 95, cartoonist, playwright (Knock Knock), and screenwriter (Popeye, Munro), Pulitzer Prize winner (1986) (b. 1929)
  - Alphonza Gadsden, 79, Reformed Episcopal Church bishop of the Southeast (b. 1945)
  - Richard G. Kopf, 78, jurist, judge of the U.S. District Court for Nebraska (since 1992) (b. 1946)
  - Amy Lau, 58, interior designer (b. 1966)
  - Don McCall, 80, football player (New Orleans Saints, Pittsburgh Steelers) (b. 1944)
  - Jan Shepard, 96, actress (Attack of the Giant Leeches, King Creole, Paradise, Hawaiian Style) (b. 1928)
  - David Schneiderman, 77, newspaper editor (The Village Voice) (b. 1947)
  - Martin Truex Sr., 66, racing driver (NASCAR) (b. 1958)
- January 18
  - Bill Belden, 76, Olympic rower (1976) (b. 1949)
  - Charles A. Doswell III, 79, meteorologist (b. 1945)
  - Aaron De Groft, 59, museum director, author and art curator (b. 1965)
  - Richard J. Howrigan, 91, politician, member of the Vermont House of Representatives (1995–2013) (b. 1933)
  - Paul Rader, 90, religious leader, General of The Salvation Army (1994–1999) (b. 1934)
  - André Soltner, 92, French-born chef, restaurateur (Lutèce), and author (b. 1932)
  - Richard A. Stratton, 93, naval aviator and commander (Vietnam War) (b. 1931)
- January 19
  - Francis Borkowski, 88, academic and university administrator (b. 1936)
  - Matthew Gergely, 45, politician, member of the Pennsylvania House of Representatives (since 2023)
  - Bob Perkins, 91, disc jockey (WRTI, WCHD) and columnist (The Philadelphia Tribune) (b. 1932)
  - Joyce Piven, 94, actress and director (b. 1930)
  - Charles Schodowski, 90, entertainer and television presenter (Big Chuck and Lil' John) (b. 1934)
  - Jeff Torborg, 83, baseball player (Los Angeles Dodgers) and manager (Chicago White Sox) (b. 1941)
- January 20
  - Lynn Ban, 51, Singaporean-born jewelry designer (b. 1972)
  - Edward L. Bowen, 82, horse racing historian and author (b. 1942)
  - Bobby Cuellar, 72, baseball player (Texas Rangers) (b. 1952)
  - Shirley Hankins, 93, politician, member of the Washington House of Representatives (1981–1990, 1995–2009) and Senate (1990) (b. 1931)
  - Willard Ikola, 92, ice hockey player and coach (Edina High School), Olympic silver medallist (1956) (b. 1932)
  - Pete Johnson, 76, politician, state auditor of Mississippi (1988–1992) (b. 1946)
  - Bob Kuban, 84, bandleader and musician ("The Cheater") (b. 1940)
  - Fred Newhouse, 76, sprinter, Olympic champion (1976) (b. 1948)
  - Charles Phan, 62, chef (b. 1962)
  - Cecile Richards, 67, feminist activist, president of Planned Parenthood (2006–2018) (b. 1957)
  - Ginny Ruffner, 72, glass artist (b. 1952)
- January 21
  - Jo Baer, 95, painter (b. 1929)
  - J. Bruce Beckwith, 91, pathologist (b. 1933)
  - Ken Wydro, 81, playwright and lyricist (Mama, I Want to Sing!) (b. 1943)
- January 22
  - Barry Michael Cooper, 67, screenwriter (New Jack City, Sugar Hill, Above the Rim) (b. 1958)
  - Colonel DeBeers, 80, professional wrestler (b. 1945)
  - Aaron De Groft, 59, art museum director (Orlando Museum of Art) (b. 1965) (death announced on this date)
  - Loretta Ford, 104, nurse, dean of the University of Rochester School of Nursing (1972–1985) and co-founder of the first nurse practitioner graduate program (b. 1920)
  - Gallo Blue Chip, 28, racehorse (b. 1997)
  - Barry Goldberg, 83, blues musician (The Electric Flag, The Rides) (b. 1942)
  - Joe John, 85, politician and jurist, member of the North Carolina House of Representatives (2017–2025) and judge of the North Carolina Court of Appeals (1992–2000) (b. 1939)
  - Calvin Jones, 54, football player (Nebraska Cornhuskers, Oakland Raiders) (b. 1970)
- January 23
  - Ted Bassett, 103, horse racing executive (b. 1921)
  - Dana Hudkins Crawford, 93, architectural conservation developer and preservationist (b. 1931)
  - Henry L. Marsh, 91, politician, member of the Virginia Senate (1992–2014), mayor of Richmond, Virginia (1977–1982) (b. 1933)
  - Joseph Matarazzo, 99, Italian-born psychologist, president of the American Psychological Association (1989) (b. 1925)
  - Jan Mycielski, 92, Polish-born mathematician (Ehrenfeucht–Mycielski sequence, Mycielskian) (b. 1932) (death announced on this date)
  - Stephan Thernstrom, 90, academic and historian (b. 1934)
  - Benjamin Widom, 97, chemist (b. 1927)
- January 24
  - Joseph A. Amato, 86, author (b. 1938)
  - Buddy Brock, 72, songwriter ("Watermelon Crawl", "There Ain't Nothin' Wrong with the Radio", "I Wanna Fall in Love") (b. 1952/1953)
  - Iris Cummings, 104, Olympic swimmer (1936) and aviator, last surviving participant of the 1936 Summer Olympics (b. 1920)
  - Curtis Halford, 81, politician, member of the Tennessee House of Representatives (2009–2023) (b. 1943)
  - Mala Htun, 55, academic (b. 1969)
  - Jaune Quick-to-See Smith, 85, visual artist and curator (b. 1940)
  - Unk, 42, rapper ("Walk It Out", "2 Step", "Show Out") (b. 1982)
- January 25
  - Greg Bell, 94, long jumper, Olympic champion (1956) (b. 1930)
  - Joseph Bernal, 97, politician, member of the Texas House of Representatives (1964–1966) and Senate (1966–1972) (b. 1927)
  - Harold Katz, 87, nutrition industry and basketball executive, founder of Nutrisystem, and owner of the Philadelphia 76ers (1981–1996) (b. 1937)
  - Olga James, 95, actress (Carmen Jones) and singer (b. 1929)
  - Ernie Nestor, 78, college basketball coach (George Mason, Elon) (b. 1946)
  - Jim Tauber, 74, film producer (Stand Up Guys, The Place Beyond the Pines, The Age of Adaline) (b. 1950)
- January 26
  - Gary Grier, singer (The Contours).
  - Pableaux Johnson, 59, journalist and food writer (b. 1966)
  - Dulcinea Langfelder, 69, multidisciplinary artist (b. 1955)
  - Suzanne Massie, 94, historian (b. 1931)
  - Norbert, 15, therapy dog (b. 2009)
- January 27
  - Alonzo Davis, 82, artist and academic (b. 1942)
  - Myles Hollander, 83, academic statistician (b. 1941)
  - Michael Katz, 85, journalist (The New York Times, New York Daily News) (b. 1939)
  - Efrem Winters, 61, basketball player (Illinois Fighting Illini) (b. 1963)
- January 28
  - William Leuchtenburg, 102, historian (b. 1922)
  - Mahmoud Saeed, 86, Iraqi-born novelist (b. 1939)
  - Gene Schroeder, 95, football player (Chicago Bears) (b. 1929)
- January 29
  - Edward Greer, 100, major general (b. 1924)
  - Joe Hale, 99, animator (Sleeping Beauty, The Black Hole) and film producer (The Black Cauldron) (b. 1925)
  - John Huard, 80, Hall of Fame football player (Maine Black Bears, Denver Broncos, Toronto Argonauts) (b. 1944)
  - Alexandr Kirsanov, 46, Azerbaijani-born ice dancer (b. 1978)
- January 30
  - Dick Button, 95, figure skater, Olympic champion (1948, 1952), five-time world champion (b. 1929)
  - Daniel L. Ritchie, 93, businessman, chancellor of the University of Denver (1988–2005) (b. 1931)
- January 31
  - Susan Alcorn, 71–72, composer and pedal steel guitarist (b. 1953) (death announced on this date)
  - Carolyn Gargasz, 87, politician, member of the New Hampshire House of Representatives (2000–2018).
  - Martin Graber, 72, politician, member of the Iowa House of Representatives (since 2023) (b. 1952/1953)
  - Ryan Kiesel, 45, attorney and politician, member of the Oklahoma House of Representatives (2004–2010) (b. 1980)

== February ==
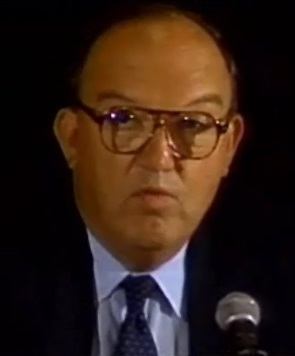
Fay Vincent

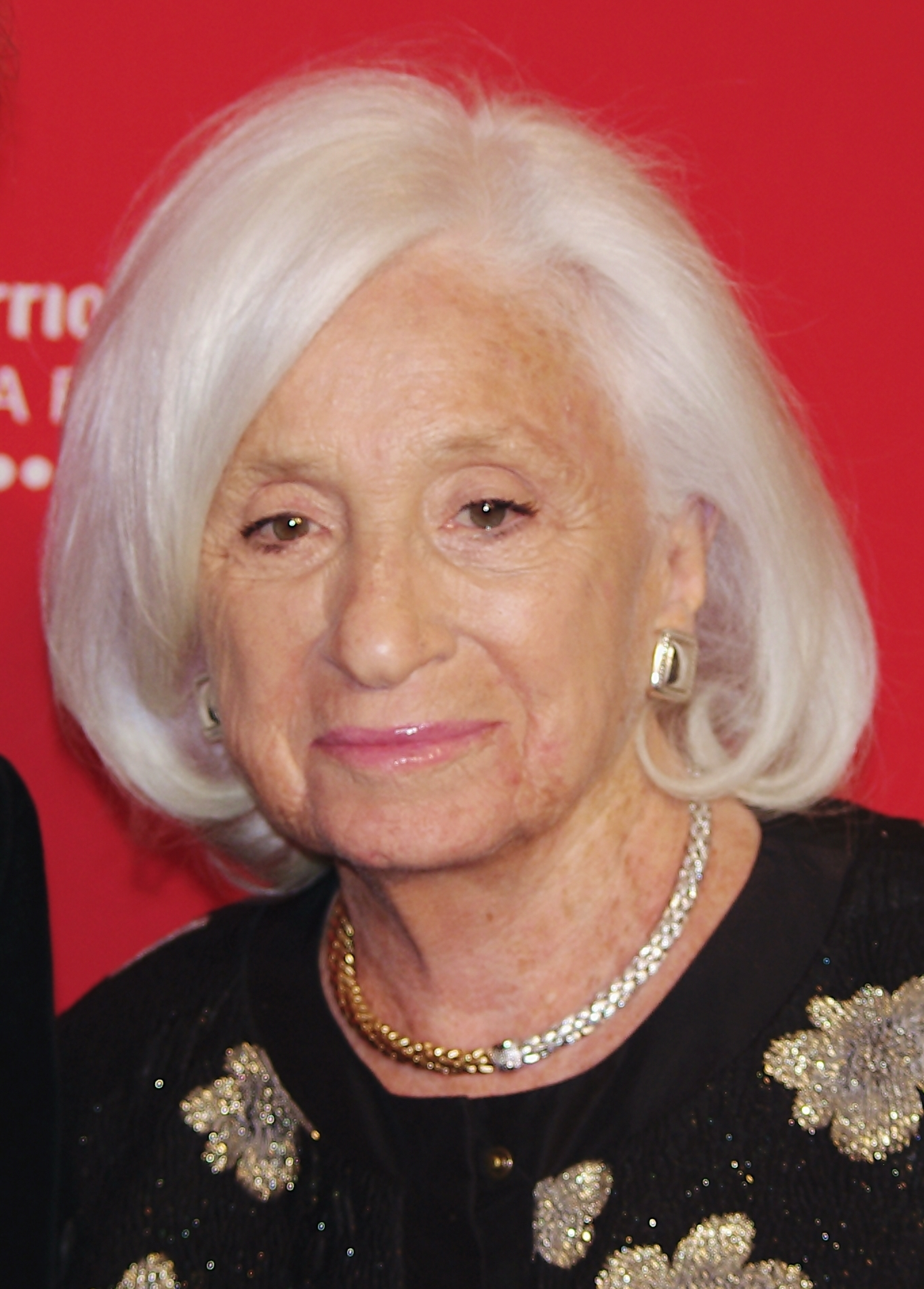
Marion Wiesel

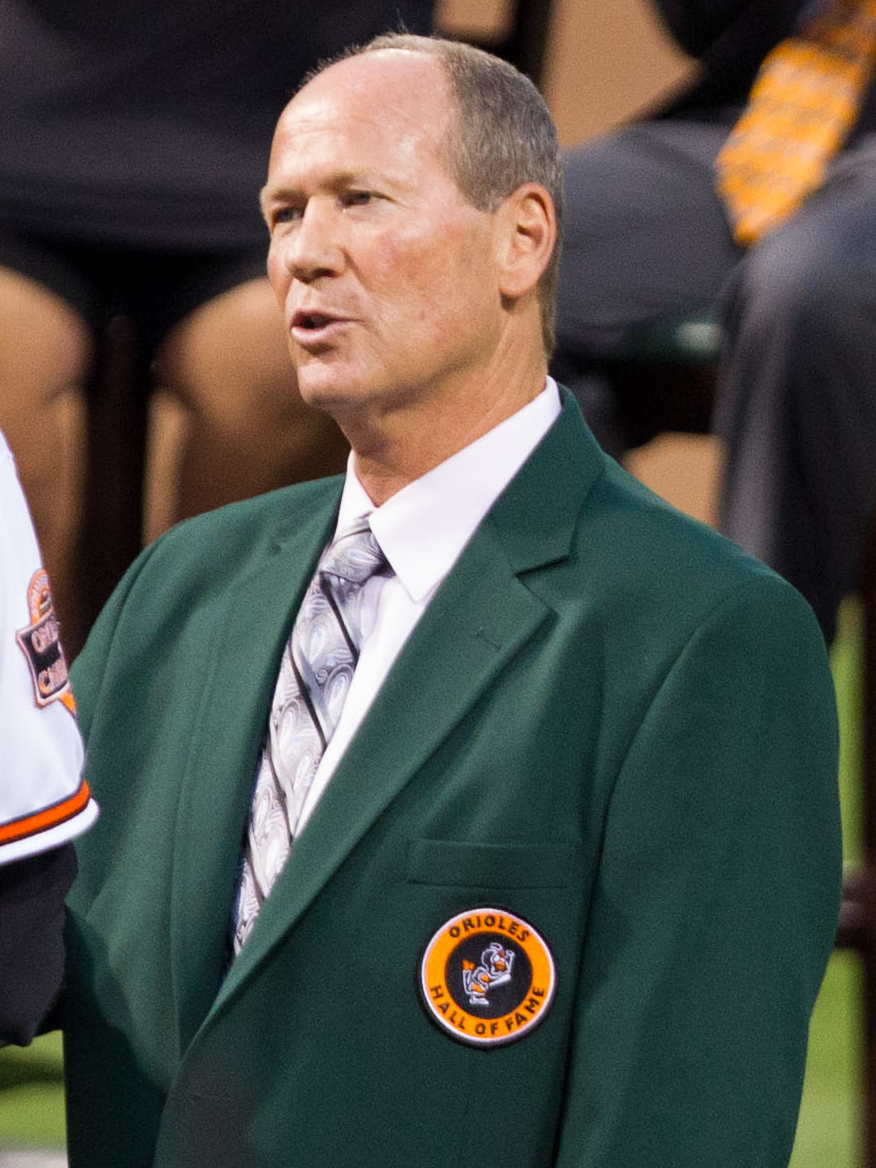
Rich Dauer

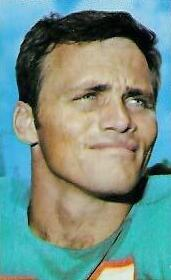
Howard Twilley

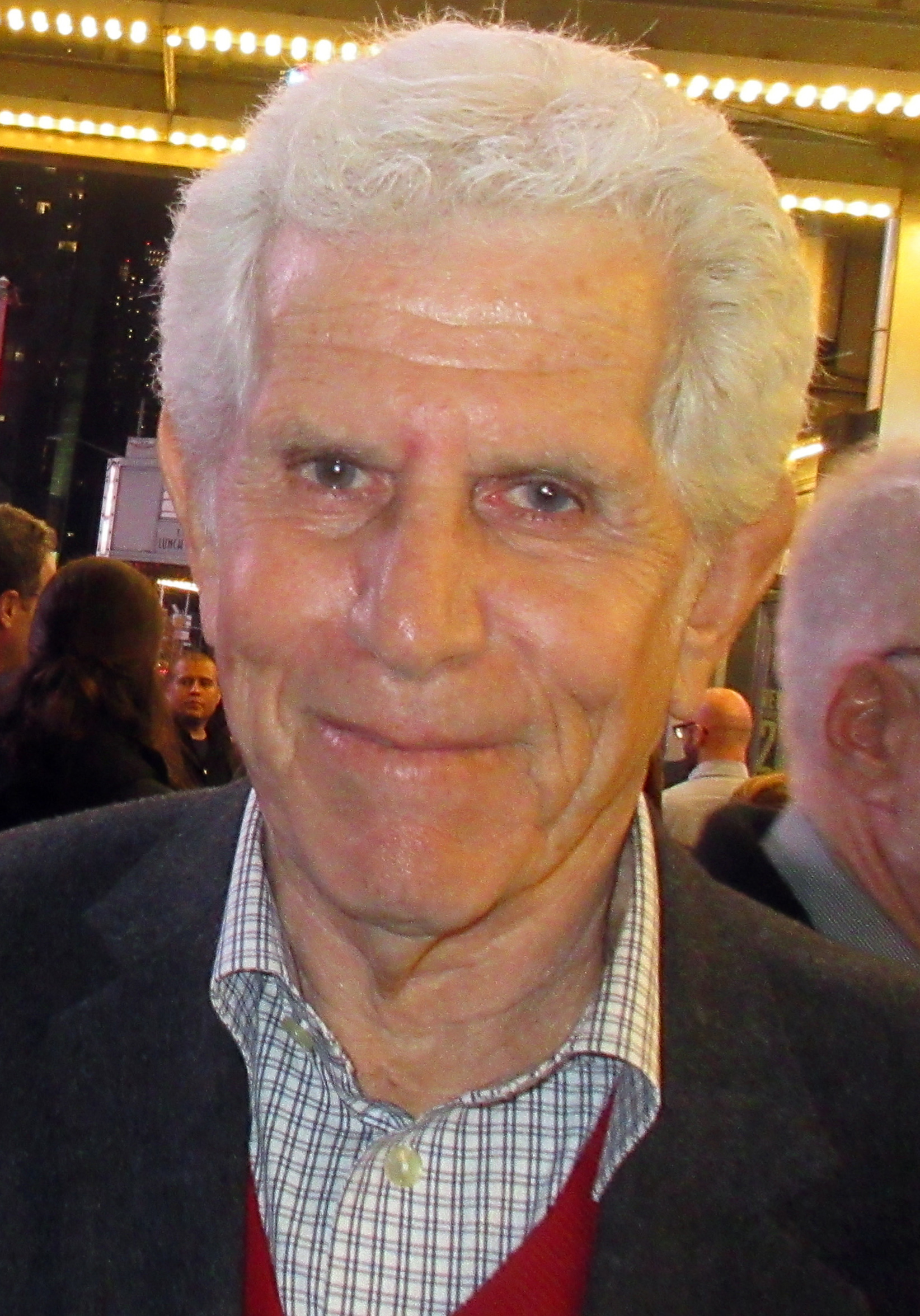
Tony Roberts

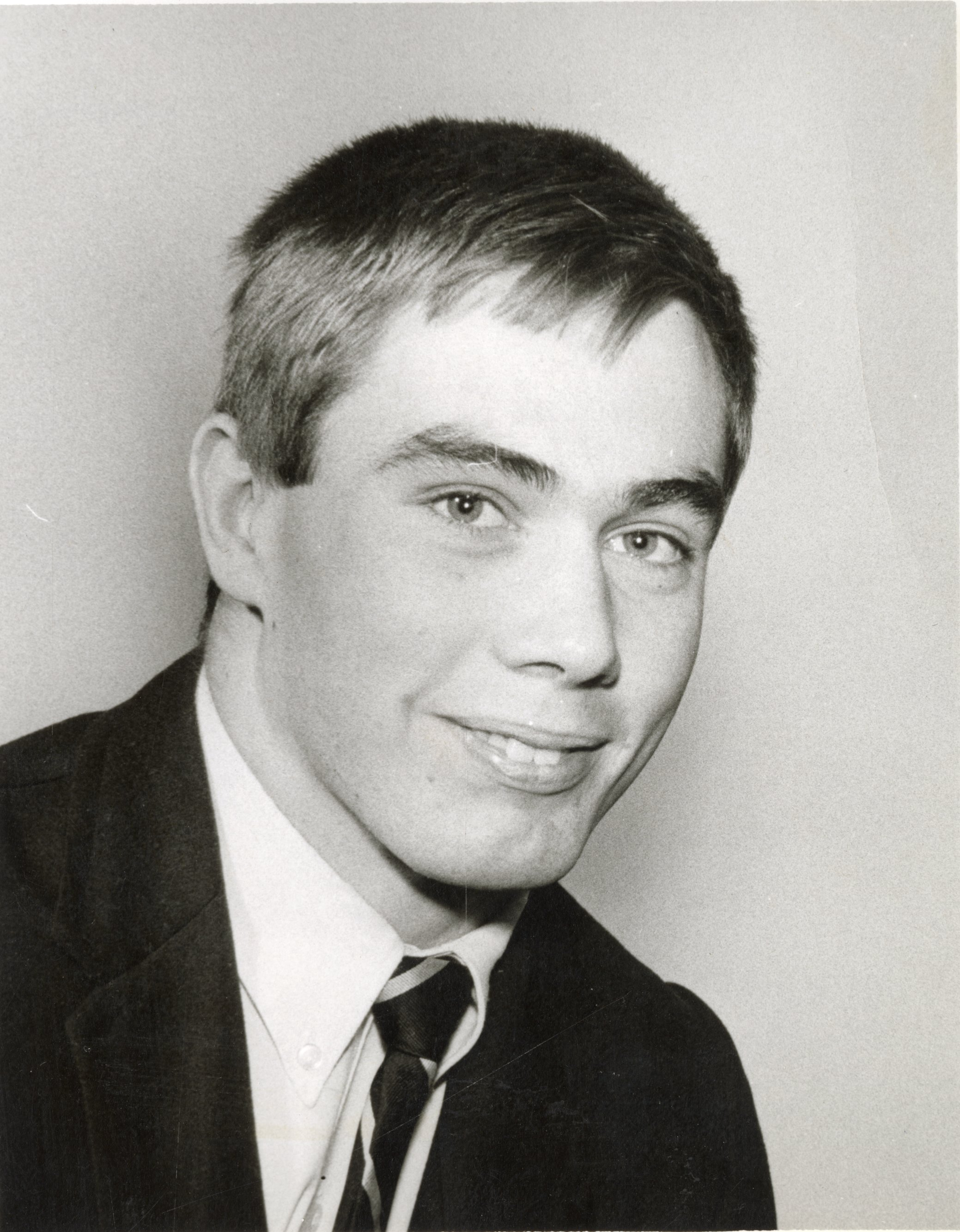
Dick Jauron

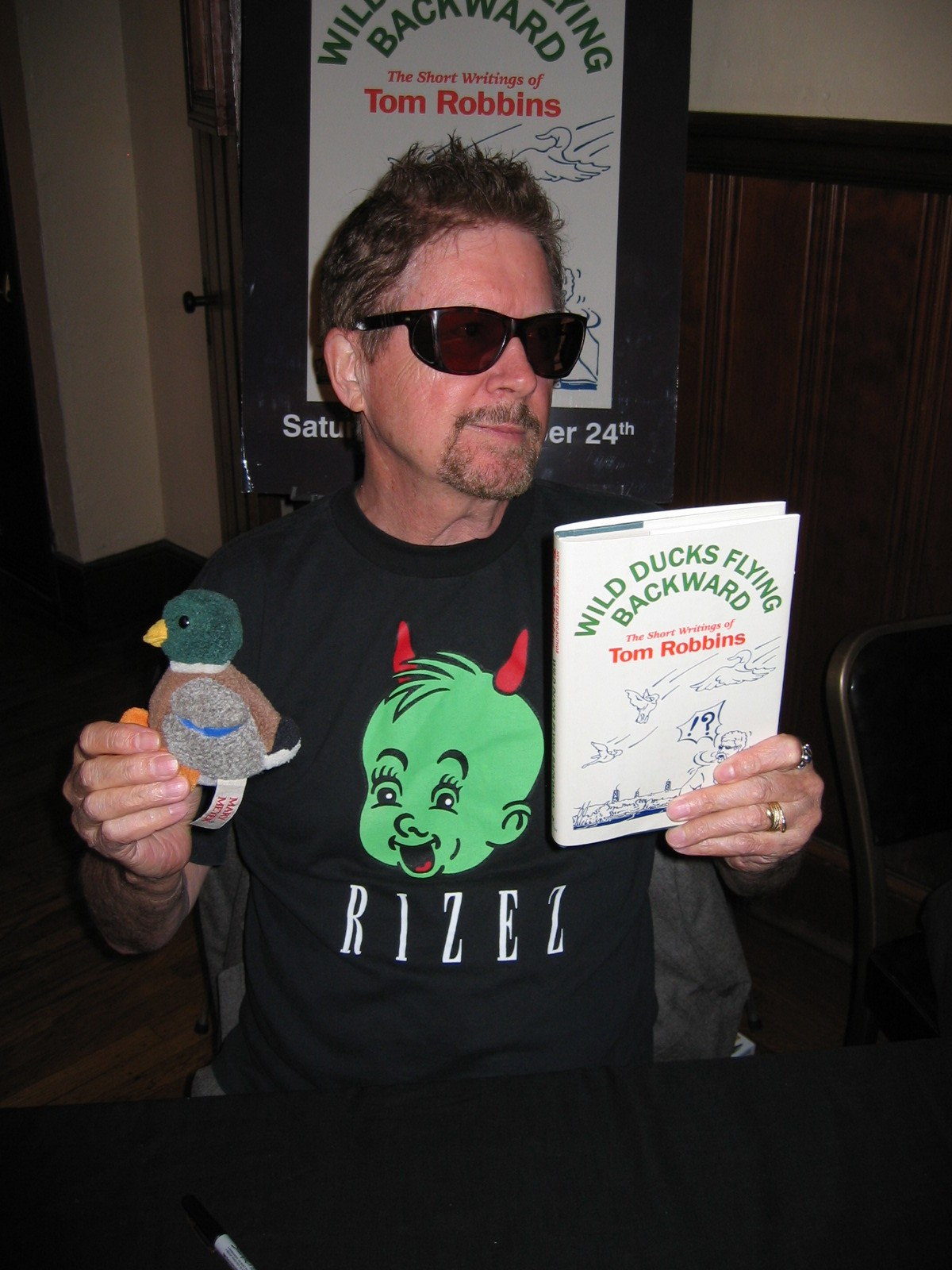
Tom Robbins

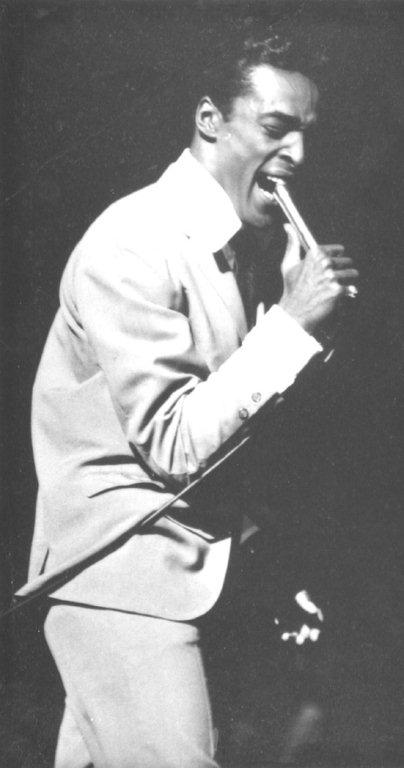
Tommy Hunt

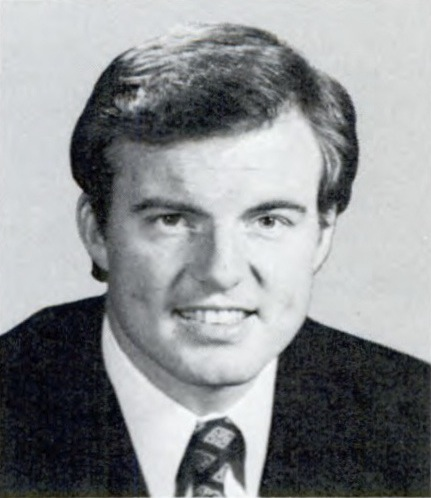
Jim Guy Tucker

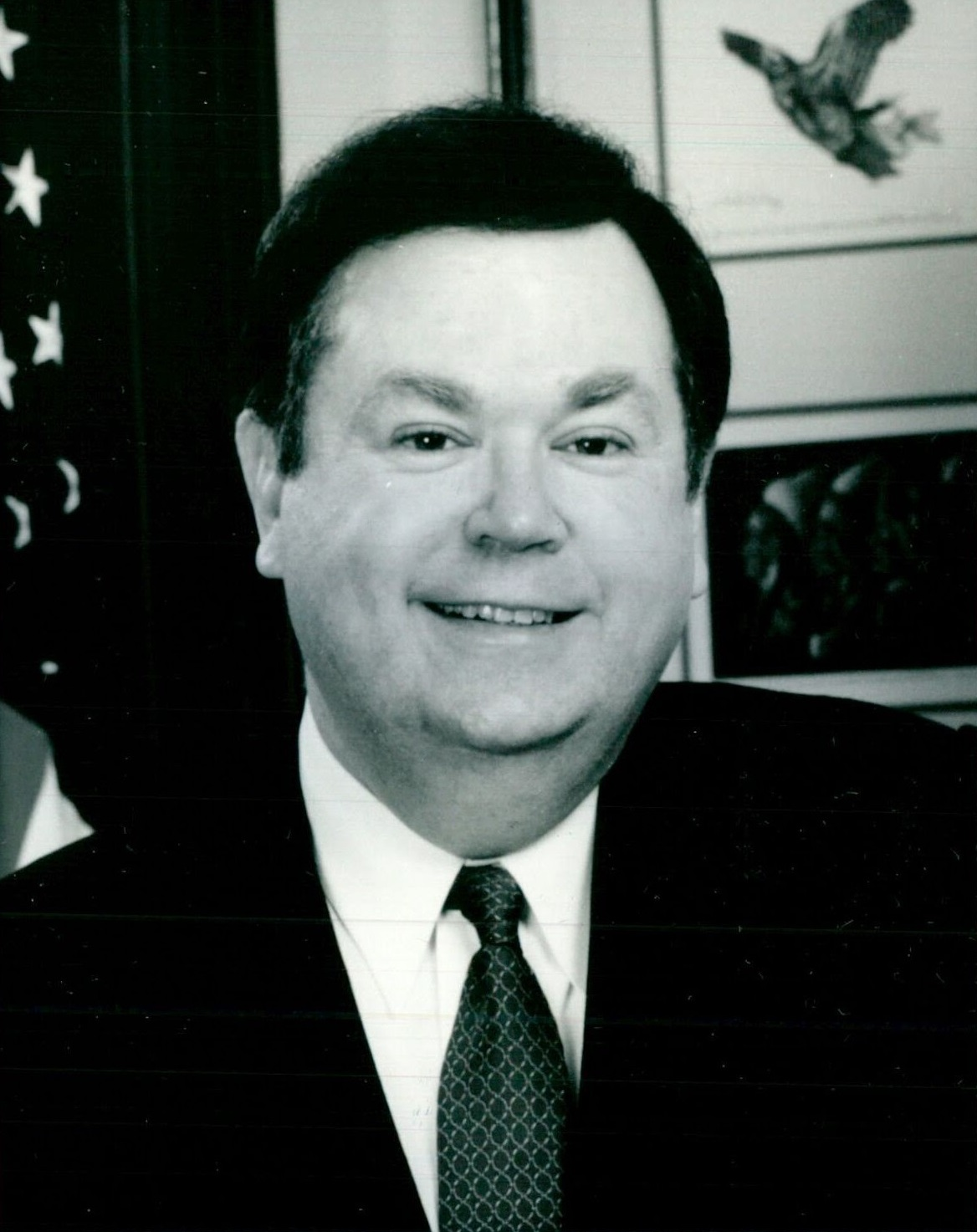
David Boren

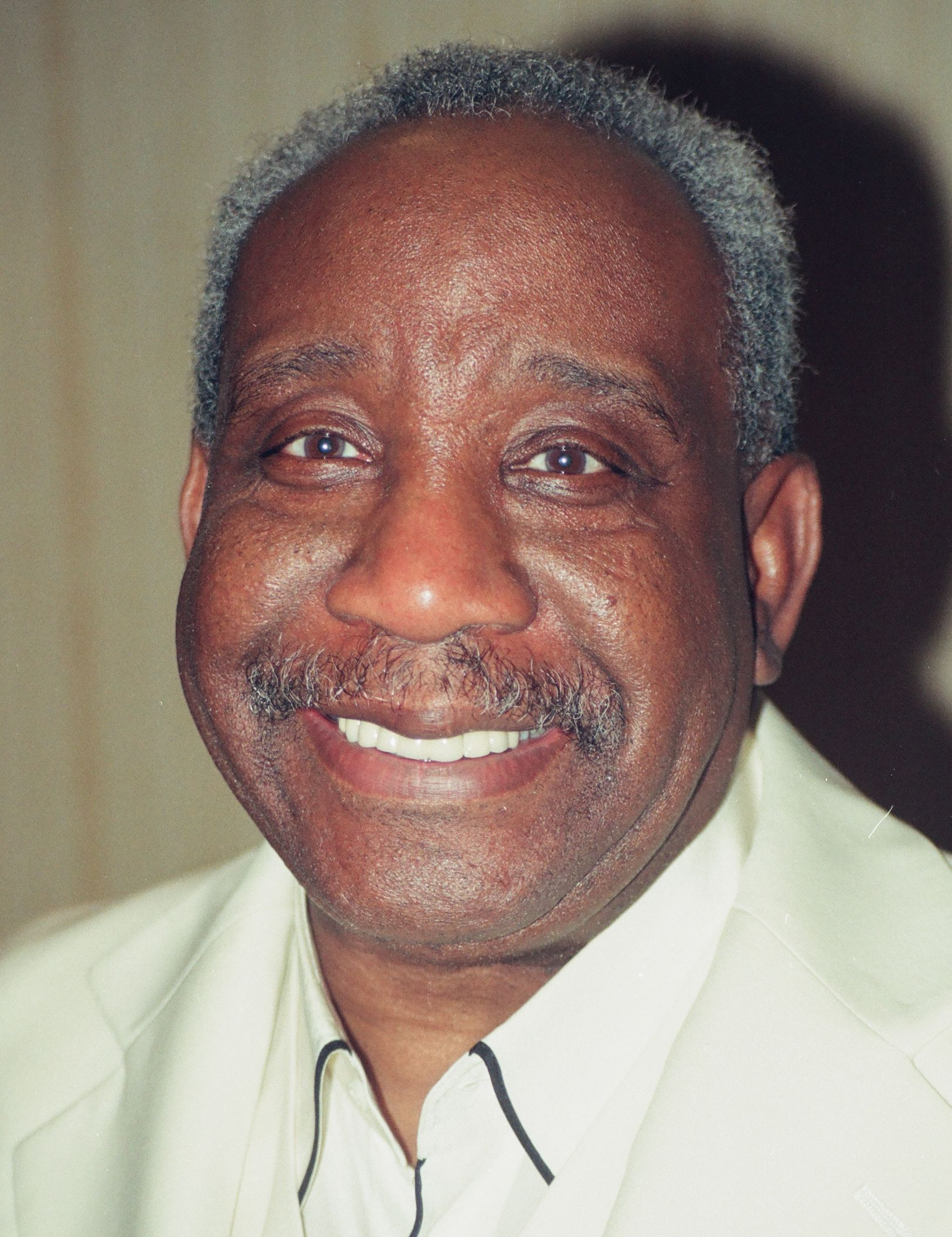
Jerry Butler

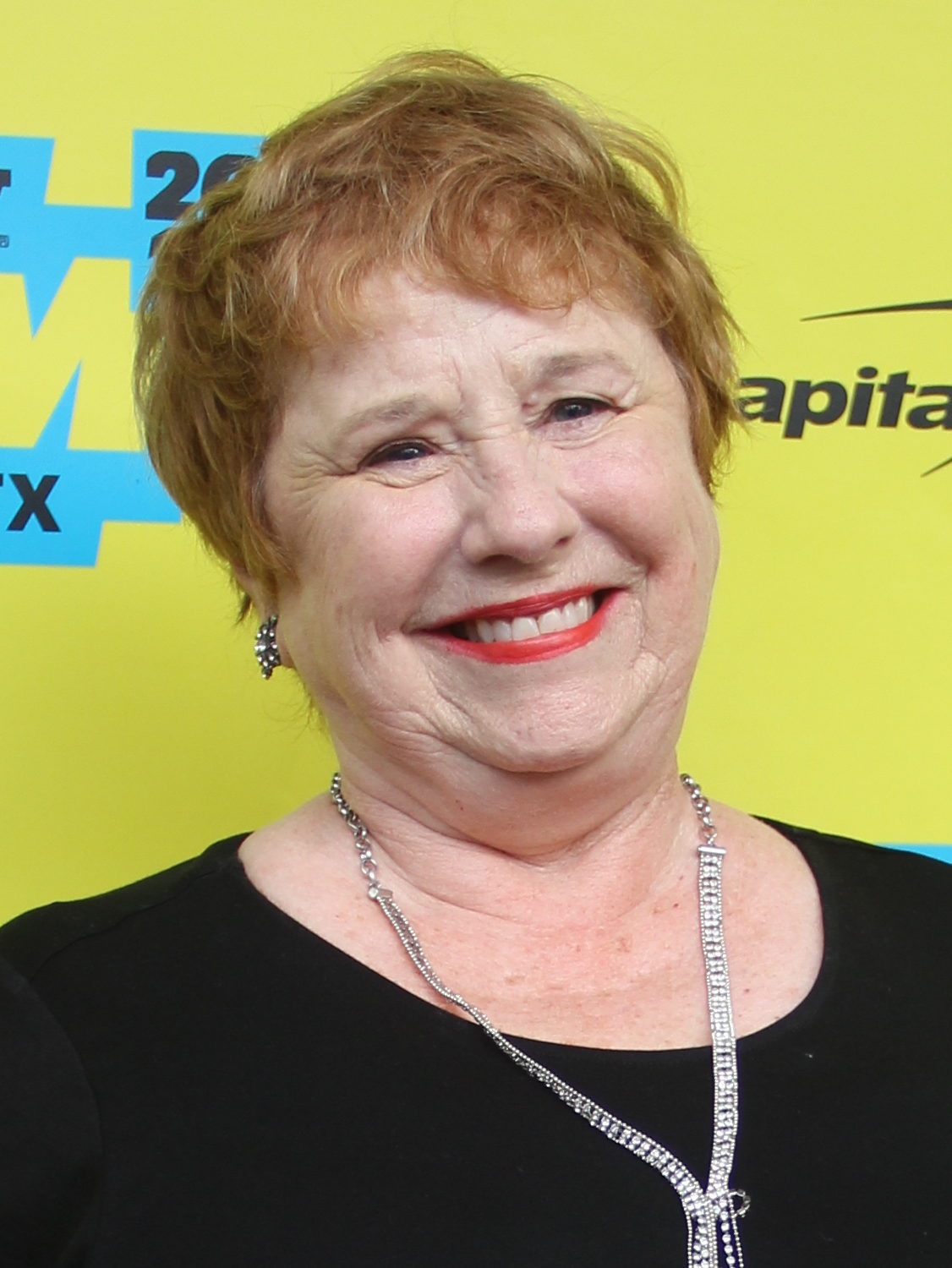
Lynne Marie Stewart

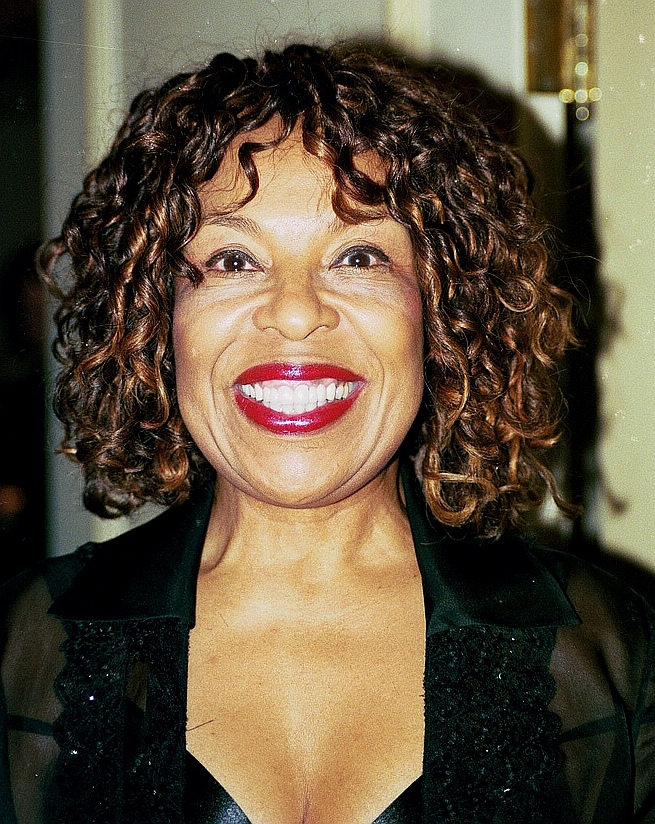
Roberta Flack

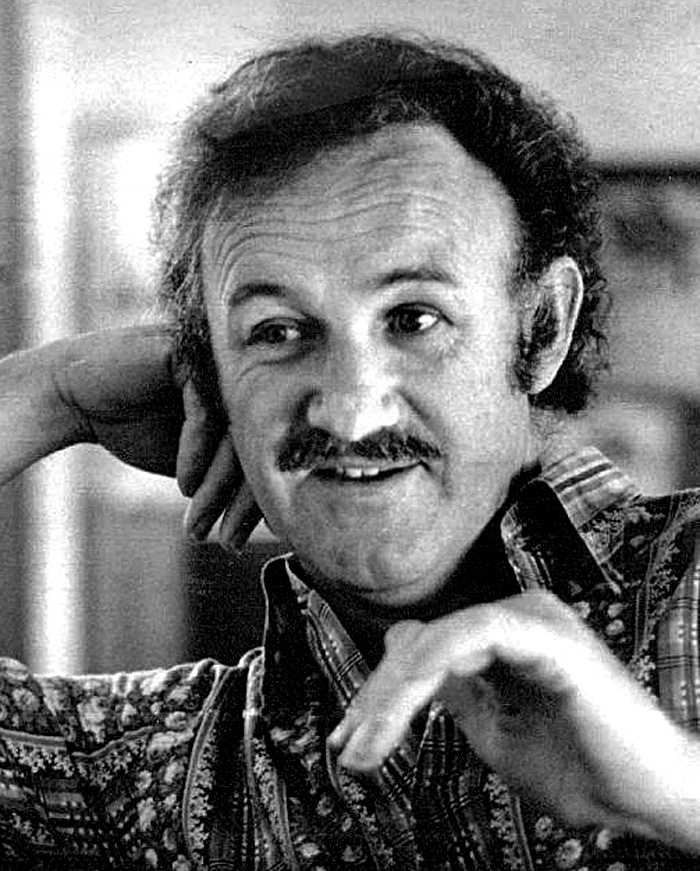
Gene Hackman

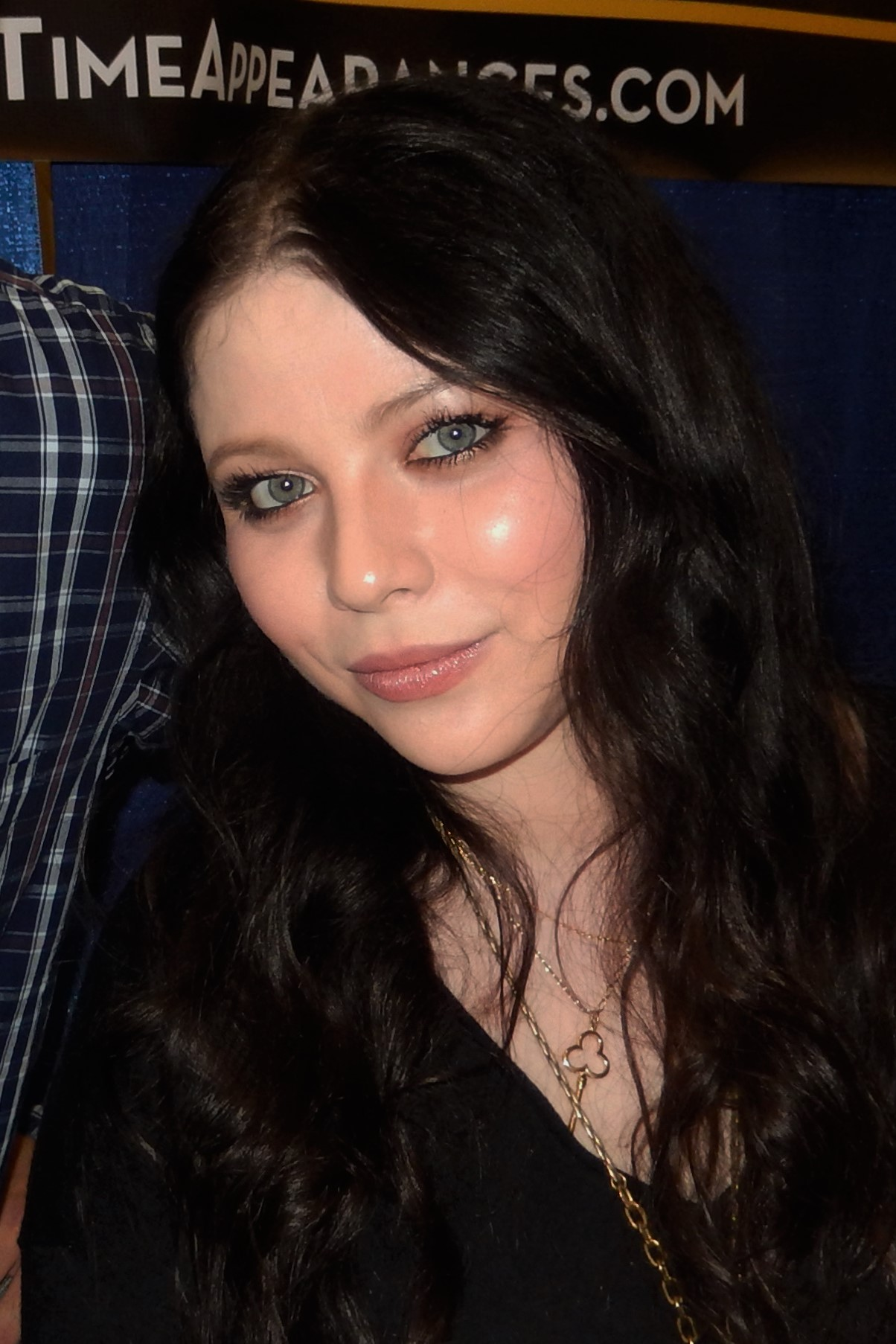
Michelle Trachtenberg

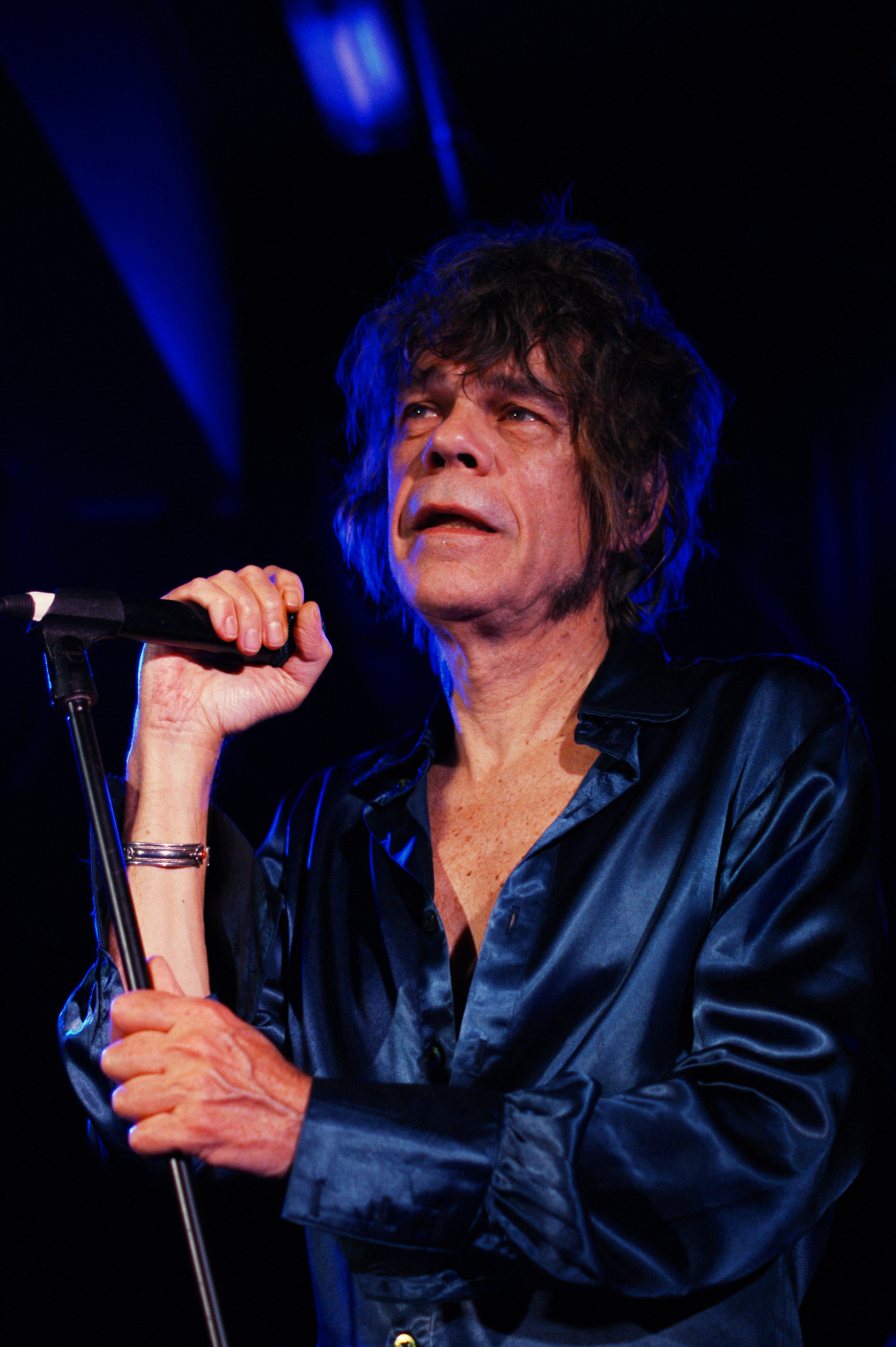
David Johansen

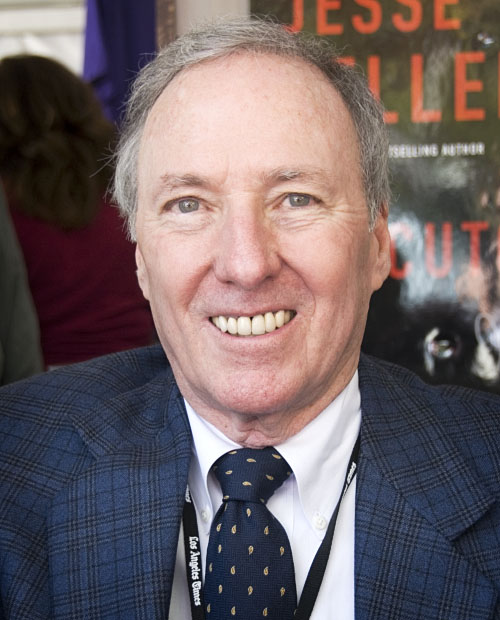
Joseph Wambaugh

- February 1
  - C. Richard Kramlich, 89, venture capitalist and video art collector (b. 1935)
  - Sal Maida, 76, rock bassist (Milk 'N' Cookies, Roxy Music, Sparks) (b. 1948)
  - Fay Vincent, 86, entertainment lawyer, Commissioner of Baseball (1989–1992) (b. 1938)
- February 2
  - Gene Barge, 98, saxophonist, composer and actor (b. 1926)
  - William J. Cabaniss, 86, politician and diplomat, ambassador to the Czech Republic (2004–2006), member of the Alabama Senate (1982–1990) (b. 1938)
  - Ed DeClercq, 72, politician, member of the New Hampshire House of Representatives (2018–2020) (b. 1952)
  - Tom Kraeutler, 65, radio host (The Money Pit Home Improvement Radio Show) (b. 1959/1960)
  - Mort Künstler, 97, artist (b. 1927)
  - Anson Rabinbach, 79, historian, co-founder and editor of New German Critique (b. 1945)
  - Harry Stewart Jr., 100, Air Force pilot (Tuskegee Airmen) (b. 1924)
  - Marion Wiesel, 94, Austrian-born translator and Holocaust survivor (b. 1931)
- February 3
  - David Edward Byrd, 83, graphic artist (b. 1941)
  - Rich Dauer, 72, Hall of Fame baseball player (Baltimore Orioles) and coach (Kansas City Royals, Colorado Rockies), World Series champion (1983, 2017) (b. 1952)
  - Paul Plishka, 83, operatic bass (b. 1941)
  - John Shumate, 72, basketball player (Detroit Pistons) and coach (Grand Canyon Antelopes) (b. 1952)
- February 4
  - Sarhad Yawsip Jammo, 83, Iraqi-born Chaldean Catholic prelate, bishop of Saint Peter the Apostle of San Diego (2002–2016) (b. 1941)
  - Bill Nations, 82, politician, mayor of Norman, Oklahoma (1992–1998), member of the Oklahoma House of Representatives (1998–2010) (b. 1942)
- February 5
  - Satoru Abe, 98, sculptor and painter (b. 1926)
  - Will Cagle, 86, racing driver (b. 1938)
  - Antonín Fajkus, 101, Czechoslovak-born fighter pilot (b. 1923)
  - Irv Gotti, 54, record producer and executive, co-founder of Murder Inc. Records (b. 1970)
  - Dave Jerden, 75, record producer (Ritual de lo Habitual, Americana) and recording engineer (Remain in Light) (b. 1949)
  - Steven Lawayne Nelson, 37, convicted murderer (b. 1987)
  - Dennis Richmond, 81, news anchor (KTVU) (b. 1943)
  - Howard Twilley, 81, football player (Tulsa Golden Hurricane, Miami Dolphins) (b. 1943)
- February 6
  - Emil Altobello, 75, politician, member of the Connecticut House of Representatives (1995–2021) (b. 1949)
  - Demetrius Terrence Frazier, 52, convicted murderer and serial rapist (b. 1972)
  - Virginia Halas McCaskey, 102, football executive and owner (Chicago Bears) (b. 1923)
  - Bobby Hamilton, singer (The Choice Four). (death announced on this date)
  - Ed Hinton, 76, motorsports writer (ESPN.com) (b. 1948)
  - Richard Meredith, 92, ice hockey player, Olympic champion (1960) (b. 1932)
  - Donald Shoup, 86, electrical engineer and urban theorist (The High Cost of Free Parking) (b. 1938)
- February 7
  - Bruce French, 79, actor (Passions, Fletch, The Riches) (b. 1945)
  - Tony Roberts, 85, actor (Annie Hall, Play It Again, Sam, A Midsummer Night's Sex Comedy) (b. 1939)
  - Burke Scott, 92, basketball player and coach (Indiana Hoosiers) (b. 1933)
- February 8
  - Bob Bingham, 78, actor (Jesus Christ Superstar) (b. 1946)
  - Matt Doyle, 70, American-born Irish tennis player (b. 1954/1955)
  - Dick Jauron, 74, football coach (Chicago Bears, Buffalo Bills) (b. 1950)
  - Christopher Jencks, 88, sociologist (b. 1936)
  - Jim Karsatos, 61, football player (Ohio State Buckeyes, Miami Dolphins) (b. 1963)
- February 9
  - William H. Bassett, 89, actor (voices in Ah! My Goddess: The Movie, Mobile Suit Gundam 0083: Stardust Memory, Ghost in the Shell: Stand Alone Complex) (b. 1935)
  - Beverly Byron, 92, politician, member of the U.S. House of Representatives (1979–1993) (b. 1932)
  - Benny Chastain, 82, racing driver (ARCA Menards Series) (b. 1942)
  - Mara Corday, 95, actress (Tarantula, The Giant Claw, The Man from Bitter Ridge) (b. 1930)
  - Wally Gabler, 80, football player (Toronto Argonauts, Hamilton Tiger-Cats, Winnipeg Blue Bombers) (b. 1944)
  - Thomas E. Kauper, 89, lawyer and legal scholar (b. 1935)
  - Mike McGinness, 77, politician, member of the Nevada Senate (1992–2012) (b. 1947)
  - Tom Robbins, 92, novelist (Even Cowgirls Get the Blues, Jitterbug Perfume, Skinny Legs and All) (b. 1932)
  - Walter Robinson, 74, painter (b. 1950)
- February 10
  - John Cernuto, 81, poker player (b. 1944)
  - Paul Hargrave, 86, biochemist (b. 1938)
  - Jeanette W. Hyde, 86, diplomat (b. 1938)
  - Bob Kierlin, 85, businessman (Fastenal) and politician, member of the Minnesota Senate (1999–2007) (b. 1939)
  - Donn Moomaw, 93, Hall of Fame football player (UCLA Bruins) and Presbyterian minister (b. 1931)
  - Mary Ellen W. Smoot, 91, religious leader (b. 1933)
  - David Socha, 86, soccer referee (b. 1938)
  - Peter Tuiasosopo, 61, football player (Los Angeles Rams) and actor (Street Fighter, Necessary Roughness) (b. 1963)
- February 11
  - Jerry Eisenberg, 87, animator (Tom & Jerry Kids, Secret Squirrel, The Flintstones) (b. 1937)
  - Danielle Legros Georges, 60, Haitian-born poet (b. 1964/1965)
  - Sampat Shivangi, 88, Indian-born physician (b. 1936/1937)
- February 12
  - Lynn August, 76, zydeco accordionist, keyboard player and singer (b. 1938)
  - Tom Fitzmorris, 74, food critic (b. 1951)
  - Dave Heaton, 84, politician, member of the Iowa House of Representatives (1995–2019) (b. 1941)
  - Tommy Hunt, 91, Hall of Fame singer (The Flamingos) (b. 1933)
- February 13
  - John Lawlor, 83, actor (Phyllis, The Facts of Life, Wyatt Earp) (b. 1941)
  - Geraldine Thompson, 76, politician, member of the Florida Senate (2012–2016, since 2022) and House of Representatives (2006–2012, 2018–2022) (b. 1948)
  - Jim Guy Tucker, 81, politician, member of the U.S. House of Representatives (1977–1979), lieutenant governor (1991–1992) and governor (1992–1996) of Arkansas (b. 1943)
- February 14
  - Walter Goffart, 90, historian (b. 1934)
  - Alice Hirson, 95, actress (Another World, Being There, One Life to Live) (b. 1929)
  - Ken Meahl, 93, Hall of Fame racing driver (b. 1931)
  - Frank S. Turner, 77, politician, member of the Maryland House of Delegates (1995–2019) (b. 1947)
  - Volponi, 27, Thoroughbred racehorse (b. 1998)
  - Biff Wiff, actor (I Think You Should Leave, Everything Everywhere All at Once, Brooklyn Nine-Nine)
- February 15
  - George Armitage, 82, film director (Hit Man, Miami Blues, Grosse Pointe Blank) (b. 1942)
  - L. Clifford Davis, 100, civil rights pioneer and attorney (b. 1924)
  - Carol Doherty, 82, politician, member of the Massachusetts House of Representatives (since 2020) (b. 1942)
  - M. Paul Friedberg, 93, landscape architect (b. 1931)
- February 16
  - Mike Collier, 71, football player (Pittsburgh Steelers, Buffalo Bills), Super Bowl champion (1976) (b. 1953)
  - Evan Hultman, 99, politician, attorney general of Iowa (1961–1965) (b. 1925)
  - Anne Marie Hochhalter, 43, school shooting survivor (Columbine High School massacre) and disability rights activist (b. 1981)
  - Yolanda Montes, 93, American-Mexican actress (Salomé, Kill Me Because I'm Dying!, Nocturne of Love) and dancer (b. 1932)
  - Marika Sherwood, 87, historian (b. 1937)
  - Jim Silke, 93, graphic designer, screenwriter (Sahara, King Solomon's Mines) and comic book artist (Rascals in Paradise) (b. 1931)
- February 17
  - Eddie Fisher, 88, baseball player (Chicago White Sox, California Angels, San Francisco Giants) (b. 1936)
  - Itch Jones, 87, baseball coach (Illinois Fighting Illini) (b. 1938)
- February 18
  - Alfred V. Covello, 92, jurist, judge (since 1992) and chief judge (1998–2003) of the U.S. District Court for Connecticut (b. 1933)
  - Josh Christy, 43, politician, member of the North Dakota House of Representatives (since 2022) (b. 1982)
  - Hurricane, 15, Secret Service dog (b. 2009)
  - Jim Koetter, 87, college football coach (Idaho State Bengals) (b. 1937)
  - Scott Sauerbeck, 53, baseball player (Pittsburgh Pirates, Boston Red Sox, Cleveland Indians) (b. 1971)
- February 19
  - Tom Beauchamp, 85, philosopher (Hume and the Problem of Causation) (b. 1939)
  - William Browder, 91, mathematician (b. 1934) (death announced on this date)
  - Robert Giblin, 72, football player (New York Giants, St. Louis Cardinals) (b. 1952)
  - Chuck Hardwick, 83, politician, member (1978–1992) and speaker (1986–1990) of the New Jersey General Assembly (b. 1941)
  - Stanley Inhorn, 96, pathologist (b. 1928)
  - Mike Lange, 76, sportscaster (Pittsburgh Penguins) (b. 1948)
  - Jerry Latin, 71, football player (Northern Illinois Huskies, St. Louis Cardinals, Los Angeles Rams) (b. 1953)
  - Andrew Lester, 86, criminal (b. 1938)
  - Papa Clem, 19, Thoroughbred racehorse (b. 2006) (death announced on this date)
  - Jay Stevens, 71, writer (b. 1953)
- February 20
  - Feroz Ahmad, 87, Turkish-born academic and historian (b. 1938)
  - David Boren, 83, politician and academic, governor of Oklahoma (1975–1979), member of the U.S. Senate (1979–1994), and president of the University of Oklahoma (1994–2018) (b. 1941)
  - Jerry Butler, 85, Hall of Fame soul singer-songwriter ("Only the Strong Survive", "He Will Break Your Heart"), musician (The Impressions) and politician (b. 1939)
  - Peter Jason, 80, actor (They Live, 48 Hrs., Deadwood) (b. 1944)
  - Mabel Landry, 92, Olympic long jumper (1952) (b. 1932)
  - Richard M. Langworth, 83, author (b. 1941)
- February 21
  - Larry Appelbaum, 67, audio engineer and jazz historian.
  - Martha Gorman Schultz, 93, Diné weaver (b. 1931)
  - Clint Hill, 93, Secret Service agent (assassination of John F. Kennedy) (b. 1932)
  - Gwen McCrae, 81, singer ("Rockin' Chair") (b. 1943) (death announced on this date)
  - Lynne Marie Stewart, 78, actress (Pee-wee's Playhouse, It's Always Sunny in Philadelphia, American Graffiti) (b. 1946)
  - Voletta Wallace, 78, record producer and film producer (Notorious) (b. 1947)
  - Mary Jo White, 83, politician, member of the Pennsylvania Senate (1997–2013) (b. 1941)
- February 22
  - Linsey Alexander, 82, songwriter, vocalist and guitarist (b. 1942)
  - John Casey, 86, novelist (Spartina) (b. 1939)
  - D Fuse, 54–55, producer, remixer and DJ (b. 1969)
  - Joe Fusco, 87, Hall of Fame college football coach (Westminster College) (b. 1938)
  - Bruce M. Selya, 90, jurist, judge on the United States District Court for the District of Rhode Island (1982–1986) and United States Court of Appeals for the First Circuit (since 1986) (b. 1943)
  - Enos Semore, 93, baseball coach (Oklahoma Sooners) (b. 1931)
  - Christopher Sepulvado, 81, convicted murderer (b. 1943)
- February 23
  - Pilar Del Rey, 95, actress (Giant) (b. 1929)
  - Larry Dolan, 94, attorney and baseball executive, owner of the Cleveland Guardians (since 2001) (b. 1931)
  - Greg Haugen, 64, boxer, IBF lightweight (1986–1987, 1988–1989) and WBO junior welterweight (1991) champion (b. 1960)
  - Eddie Hill, 67, football player (Los Angeles Rams, Miami Dolphins) (b. 1957)
  - Chris Jasper, 73, Hall of Fame singer (The Isley Brothers, Isley-Jasper-Isley), songwriter ("Caravan of Love"), keyboardist and producer (b. 1951)
  - Jan Johnson, 74, pole vaulter, Olympic bronze medallist (1972) (b. 1950)
  - Bobby Malkmus, 93, baseball player (Milwaukee Braves, Washington Senators, Philadelphia Phillies) (b. 1931)
  - Al Trautwig, 68, sports commentator (MSG Network, ABC, NBC) (b. 1956)
- February 24
  - Kevin Braswell, 46, basketball player (Southland Sharks) and coach (Wellington Saints) (b. 1979)
  - Roberta Flack, 88, singer ("Killing Me Softly With His Song", "The First Time Ever I Saw Your Face", "Feel Like Makin' Love") and songwriter (b. 1937)
  - Rose Girone, 113, Polish-born supercentenarian and Holocaust survivor (b. 1912)
  - Robert John, 79, singer ("Sad Eyes", "If You Don't Want My Love") (b. 1946)
  - István Kecskés, 77, Hungarian-born linguist and academic (b. 1947)
  - Fumi Kitahara, 56, animation publicist (b. 1968)
  - Thaddeus Matthews, 67, pastor and broadcaster (b. 1957)
  - Royce Pollard, 85, politician, mayor of Vancouver, Washington (1996–2010) (b. 1939)
  - Alvin Francis Poussaint, 90, psychiatrist and author (b. 1934)
  - Peter Sichel, 102, German-born wine merchant (b. 1922)
  - Josefina Villalobos, 100, American-born Colombian-Ecuadorian public servant, first lady of Ecuador (1992–1996) (b. 1924)
  - Frank G. Wisner, 86, diplomat, ambassador to India (1994–1997), the Philippines (1991–1992) and Egypt (1986–1991) (b. 1938)
- February 25
  - Guy Comtois, 63, politician, member of the New Hampshire House of Representatives (2010–2016) (b. 1961)
  - Arthur Firstenberg, 74, author and activist (b. 1950)
  - Bobby Frame, 65, politician (b. 1959)
  - Edward E. Leamer, 80, economist (b. 1944)
  - Martin E. Marty, 97, Lutheran historian and academic (b. 1928)
  - Roberto Orci, 51, Mexican-born screenwriter (Star Trek, Transformers) and television producer (Fringe) (b. 1973)
- February 26
  - Betsy Arakawa, 65, pianist (b. 1959) (body discovered on this date)
  - Dave Frankel, 67, news anchor and weatherman (b. 1957)
  - Gene Hackman, 95, actor (The French Connection, Mississippi Burning, Unforgiven) (b. 1930) (body discovered on this date)
  - Jim Hatfield, 81, basketball coach (Kentucky Wildcats, Louisiana Ragin' Cajuns, Mississippi State Bulldogs) (b. 1943)
  - Richard Osborne, 71, football player (Philadelphia Eagles, New York Jets, St. Louis Cardinals) (b. 1953)
  - Panty Raid, 20, Thoroughbred racehorse (b. 2004) (death announced on this date)
  - Michelle Trachtenberg, 39, actress (Buffy the Vampire Slayer, Harriet the Spy, Gossip Girl) (b. 1985)
- February 27
  - Greg Hoard, 73, journalist and sportswriter (b. 1951/1952)
  - Pierre Joris, 78, Luxembourgish-born poet and writer (b. 1946)
  - Lee Kunzman, 80, racing driver (b. 1944)
  - Paul L. Maier, 94, Lutheran clergyman and historian (b. 1930)
  - Elijah Olaniyi, 26, basketball player (Stony Brook Seawolves, Miami Hurricanes) (b. 1999)
  - Michael Preece, 88, film (The Prize Fighter) and television director (Dallas, Walker, Texas Ranger) (b. 1936)
  - Roy Prosterman, 89, legal scholar and land reform advocate (b. 1935) (death announced on this date)
- February 28
  - Clarence Hoffman, 91, politician, member of the Iowa House of Representatives (1999–2009) (b. 1933)
  - David Johansen, 75, musician (New York Dolls), singer ("Hot Hot Hot") and actor (Scrooged) (b. 1950)
  - Carson Jones, 38, boxer (b. 1986)
  - Richard Marable, 75, politician, member of the Georgia State Senate (1991–2003) (b. 1949)
  - Joseph Wambaugh, 88, novelist and screenwriter (b. 1937)

== March ==
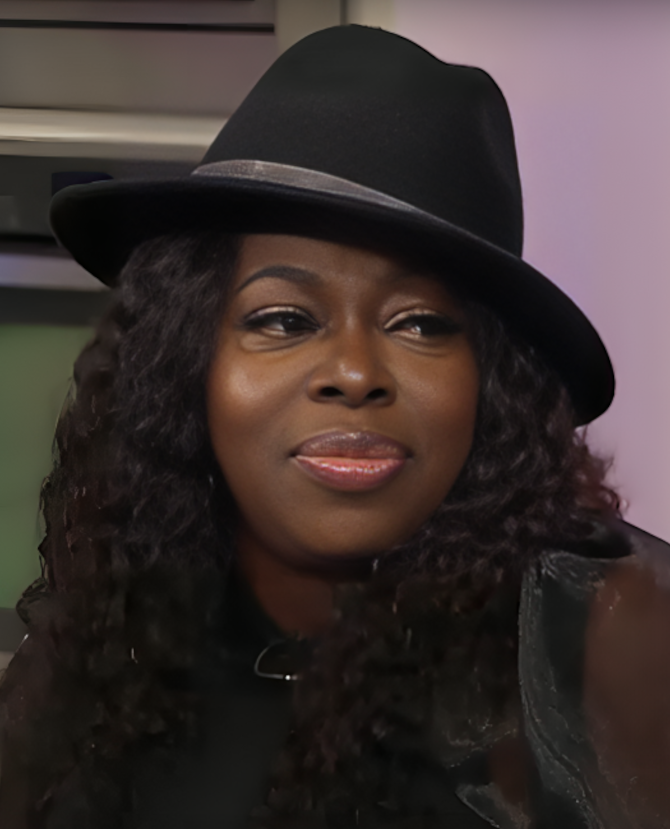
Angie Stone

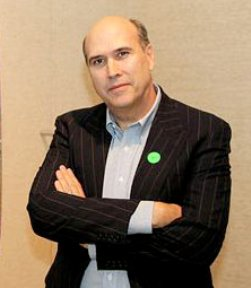
George Lowe

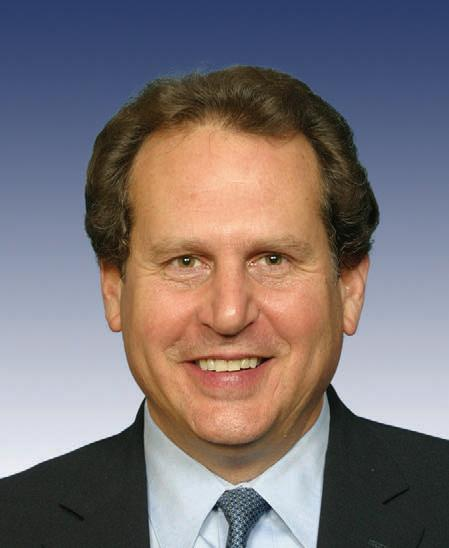
Lincoln Díaz-Balart

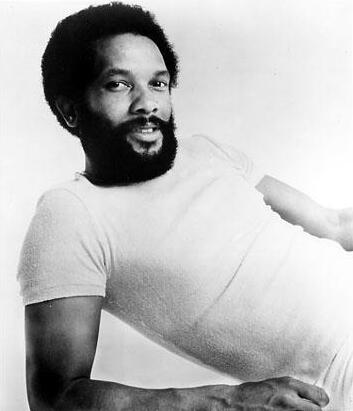
Roy Ayers

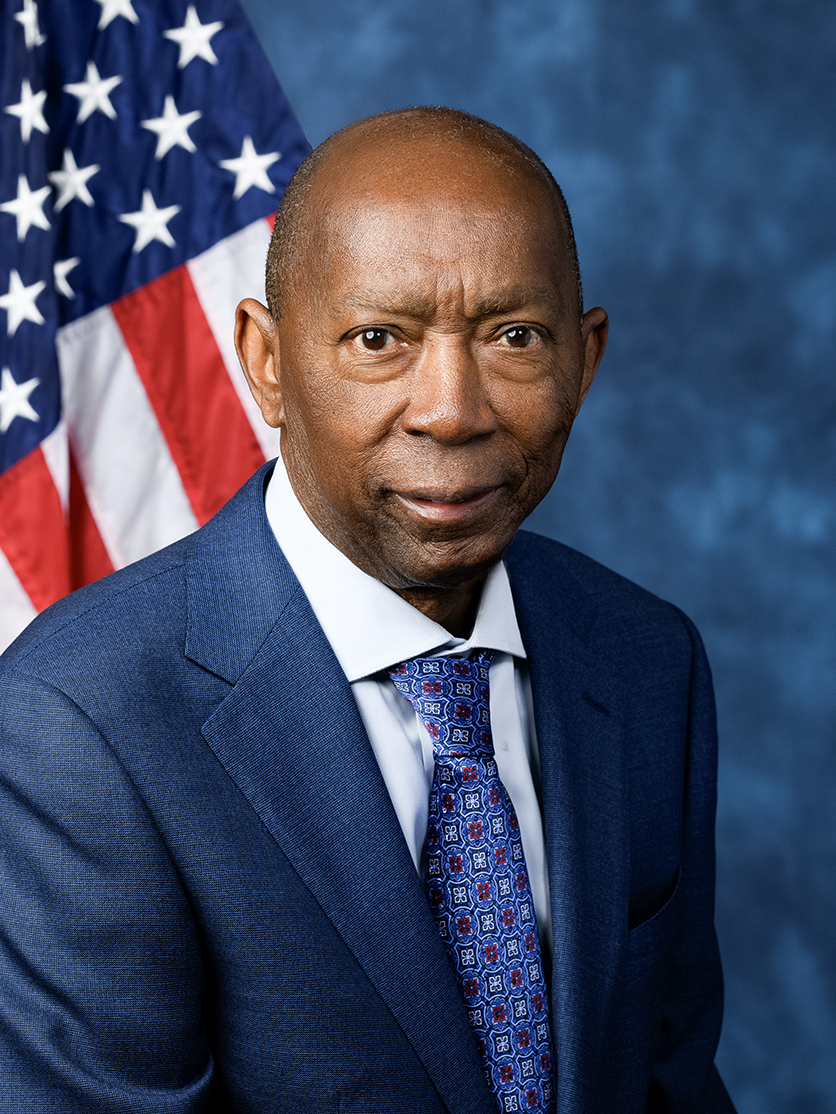
Sylvester Turner

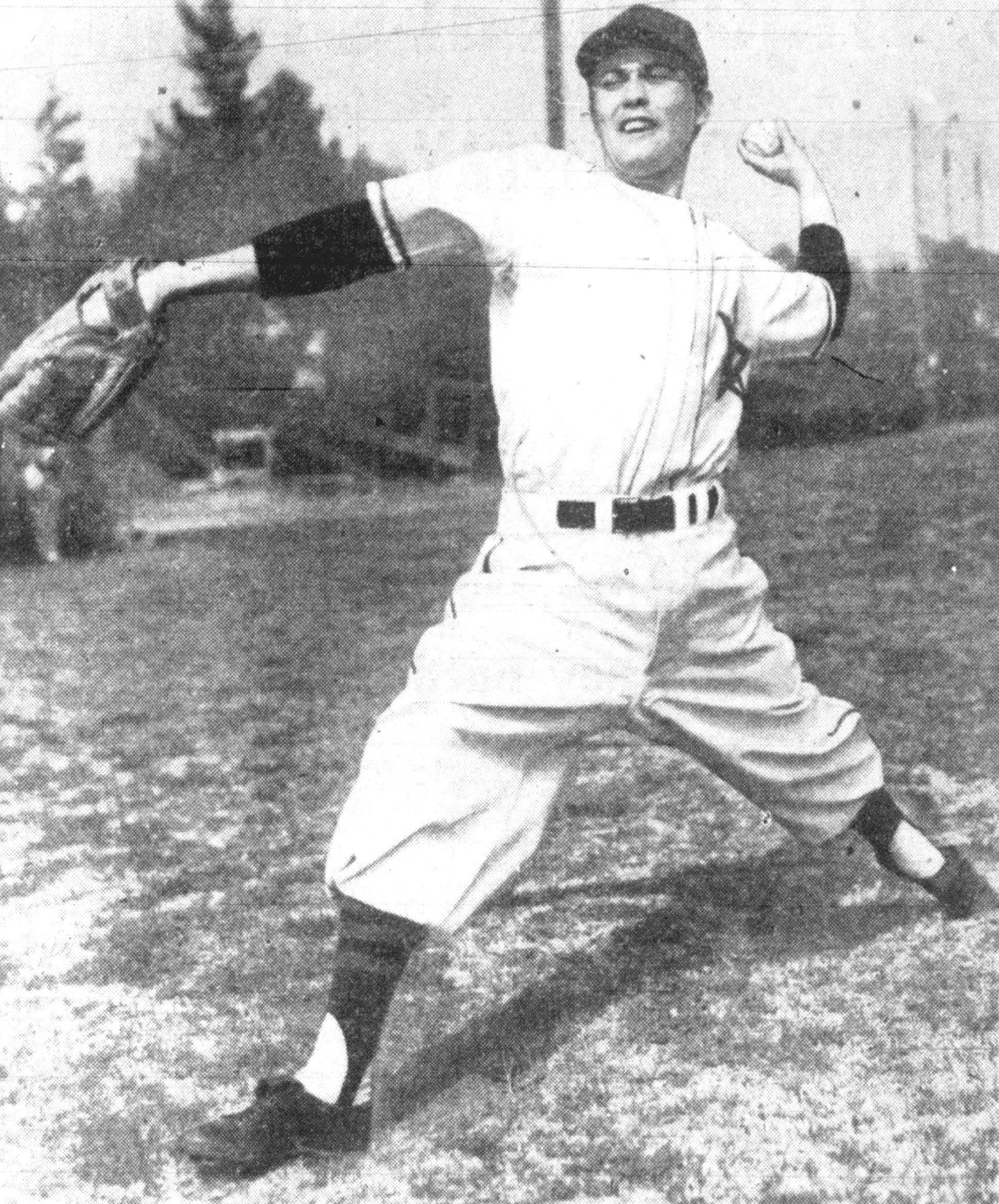
Art Schallock

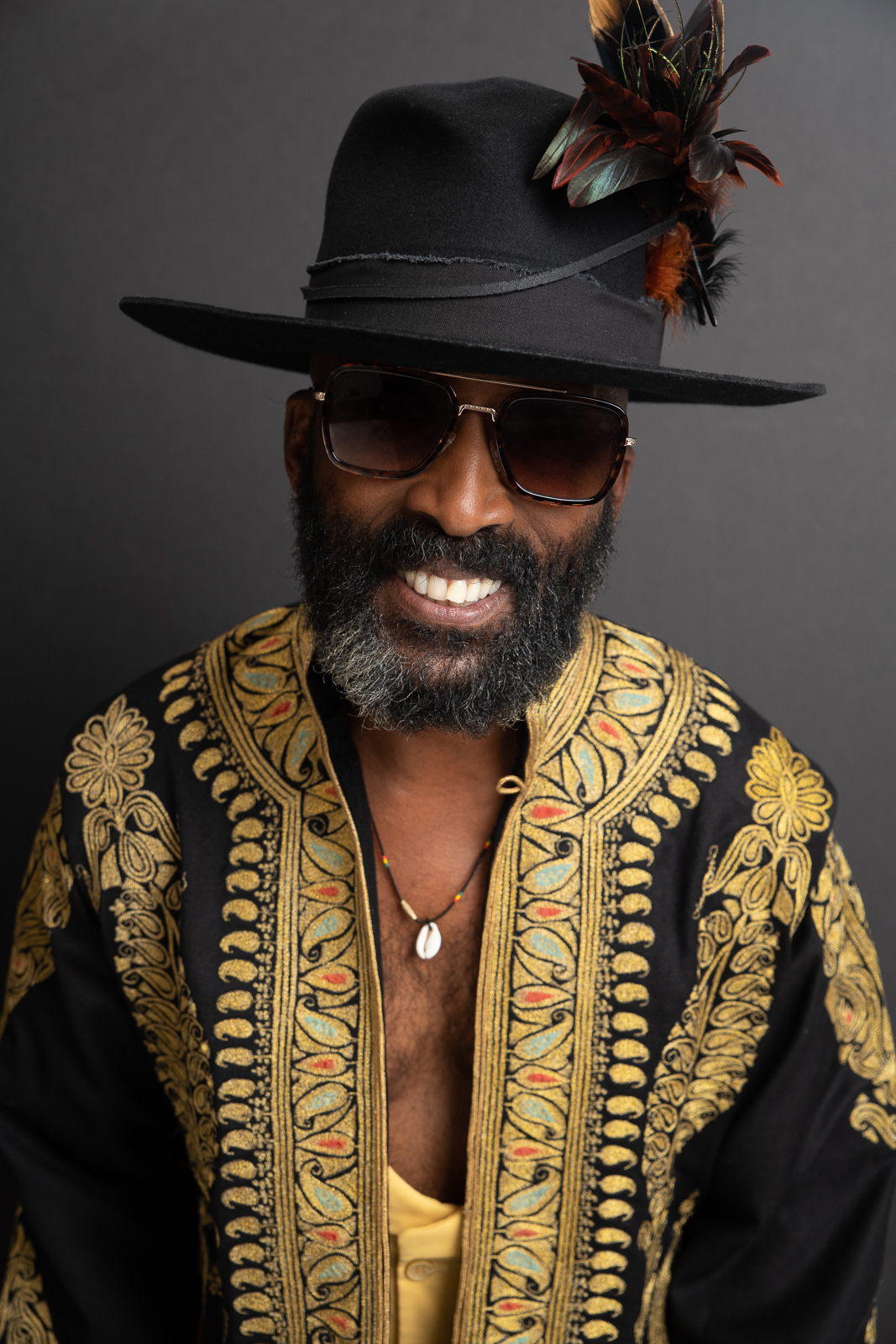
D'Wayne Wiggins

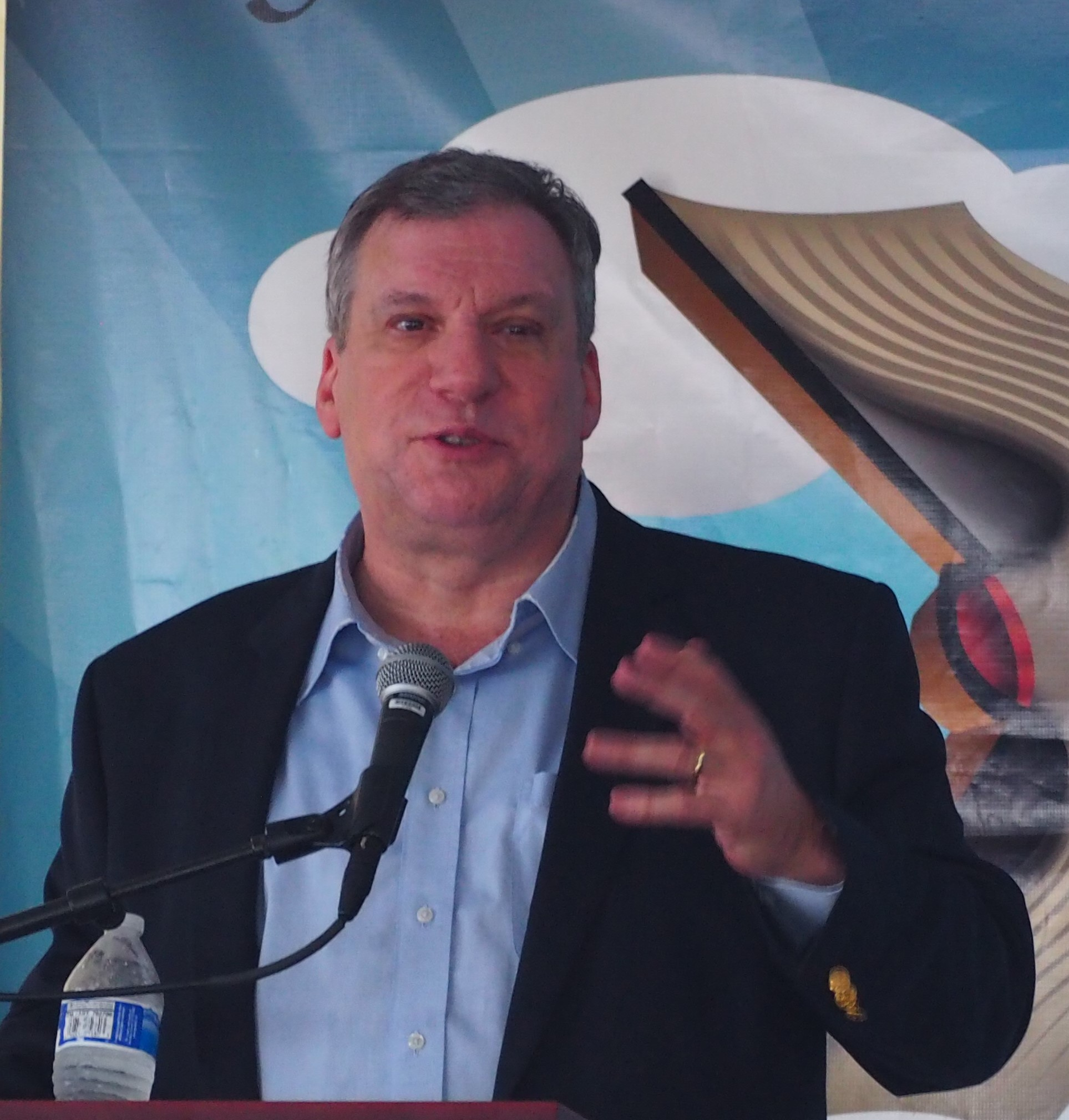
John Feinstein

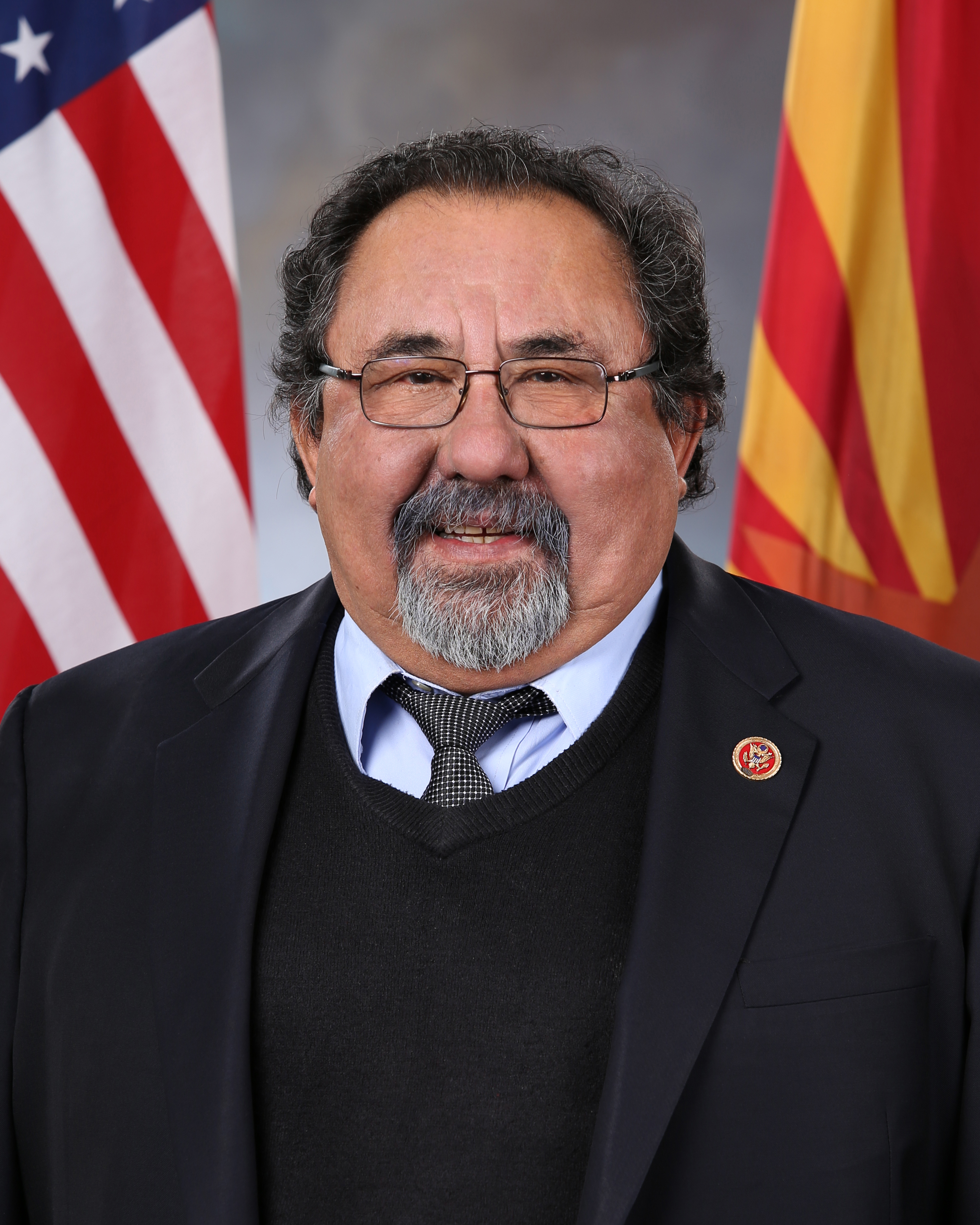
Raúl Grijalva

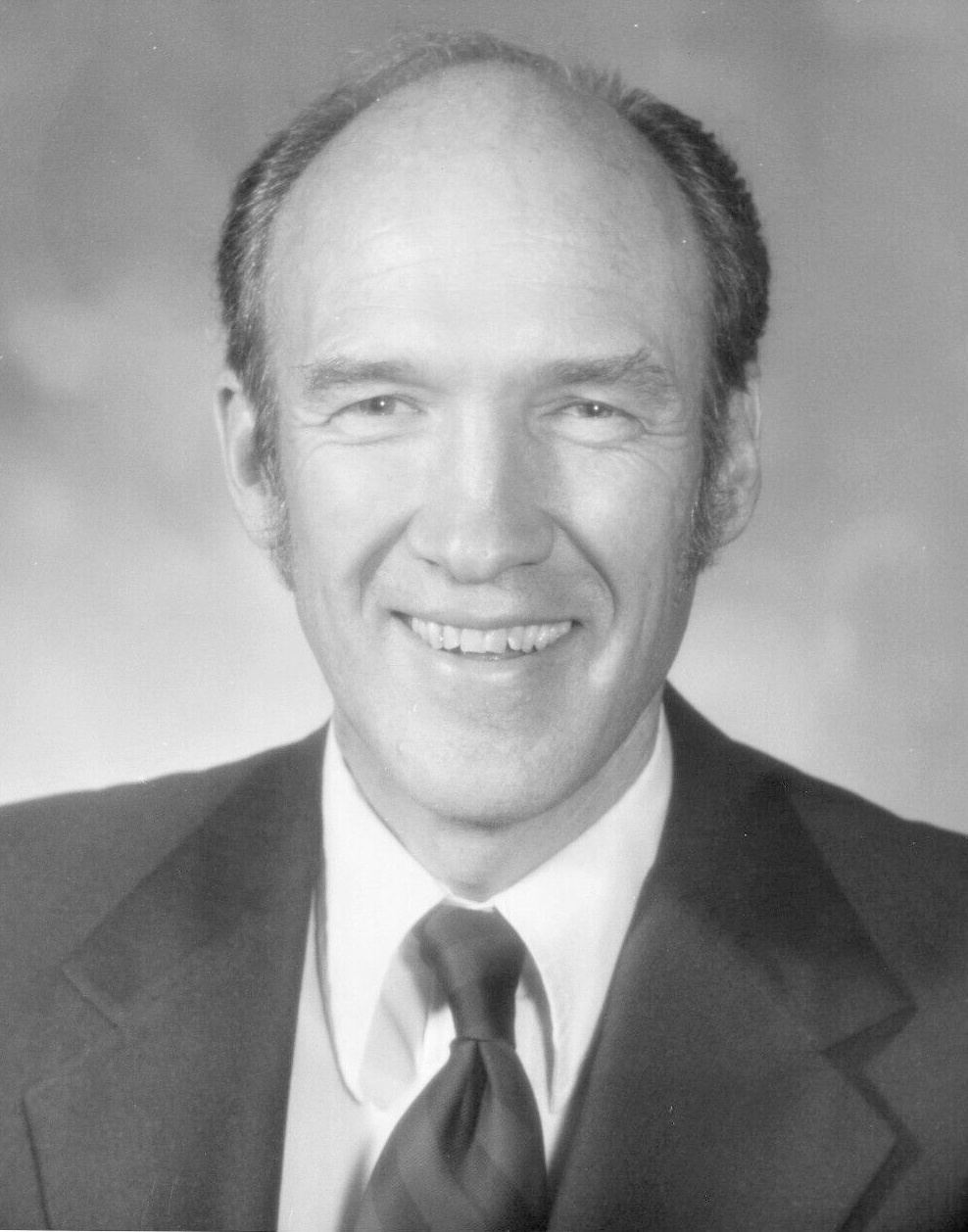
Alan Simpson

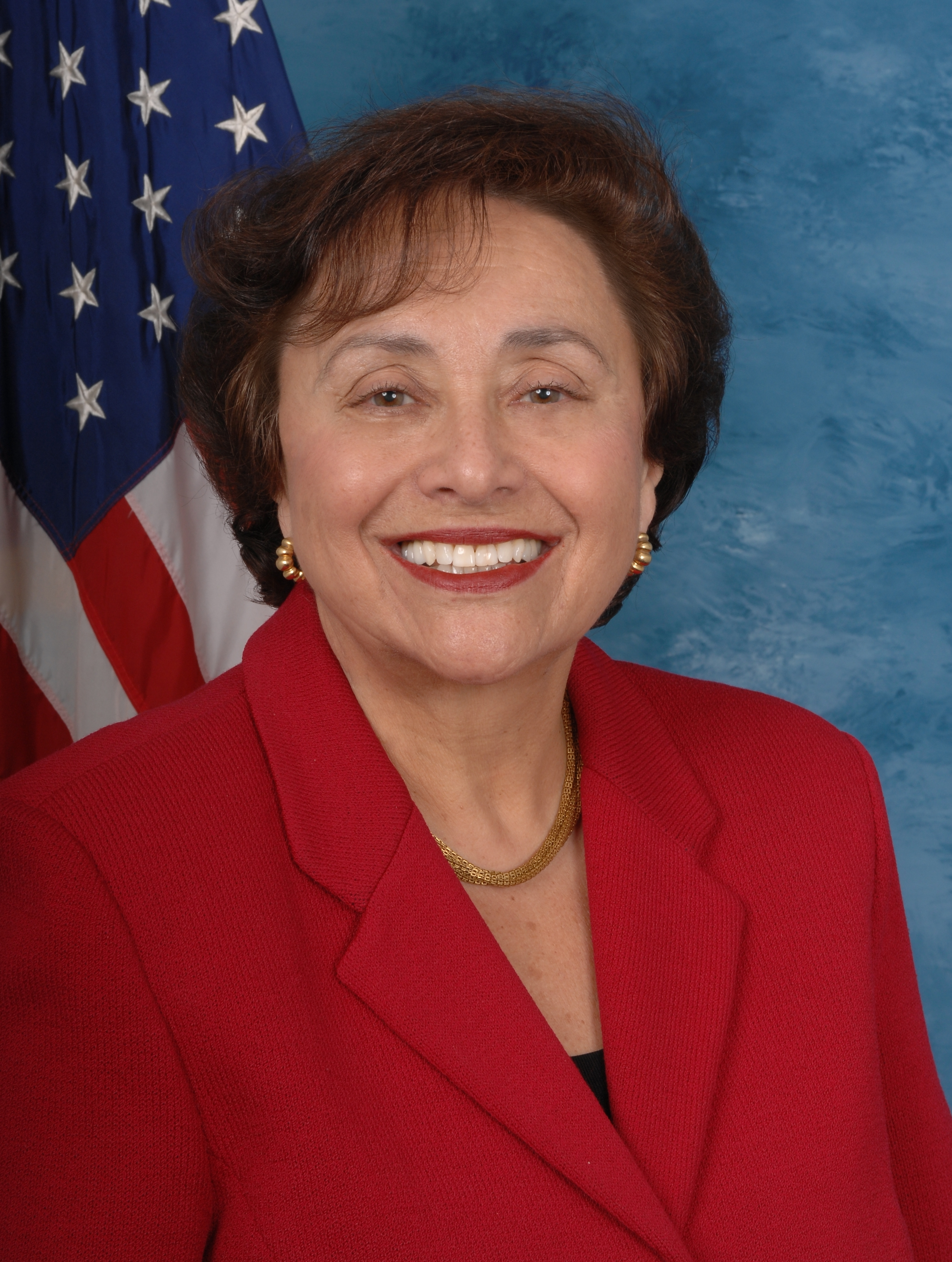
Nita Lowey

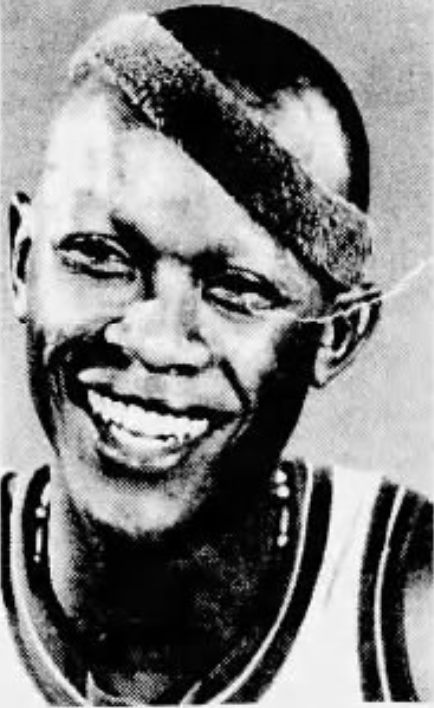
Slick Watts

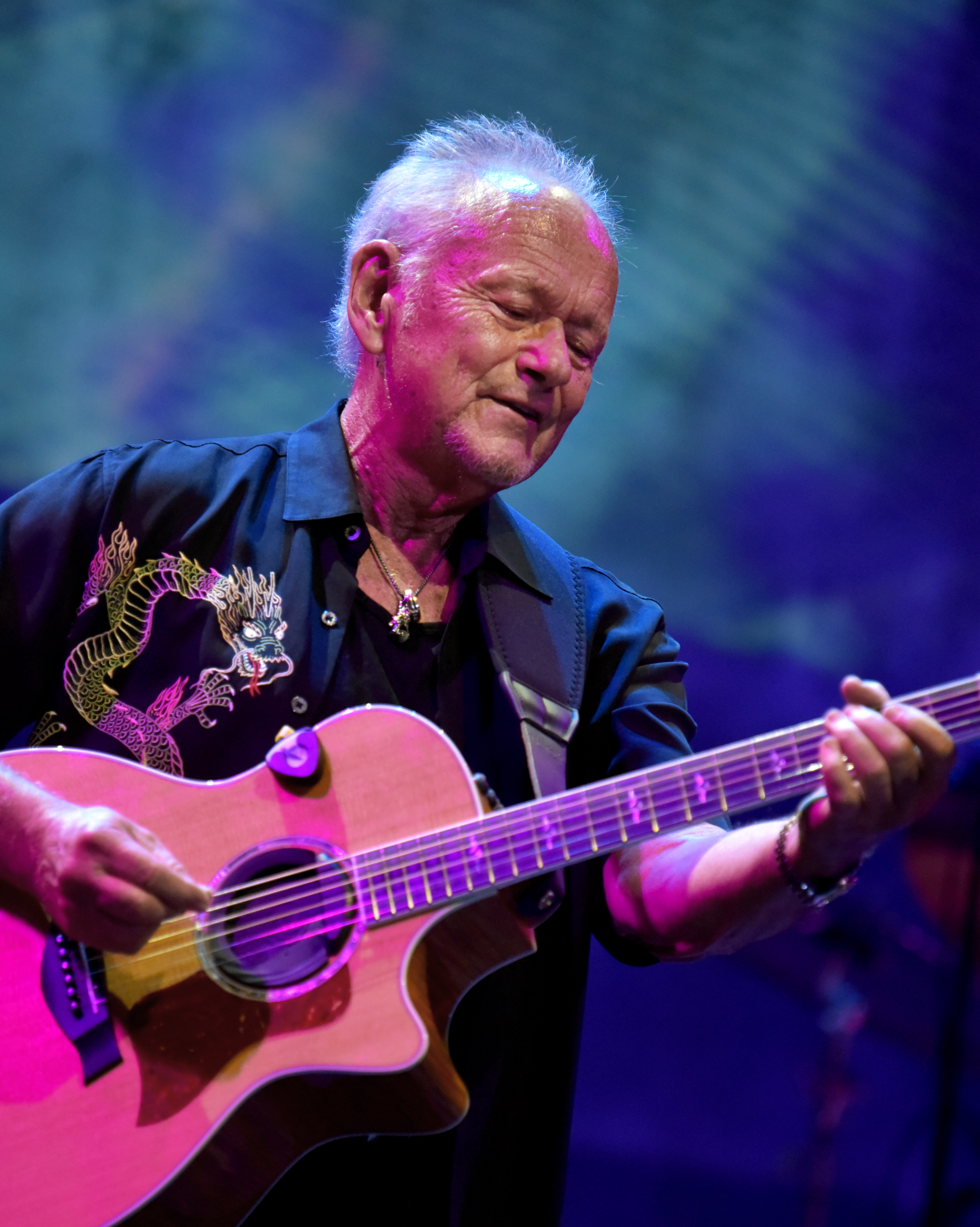
Jesse Colin Young

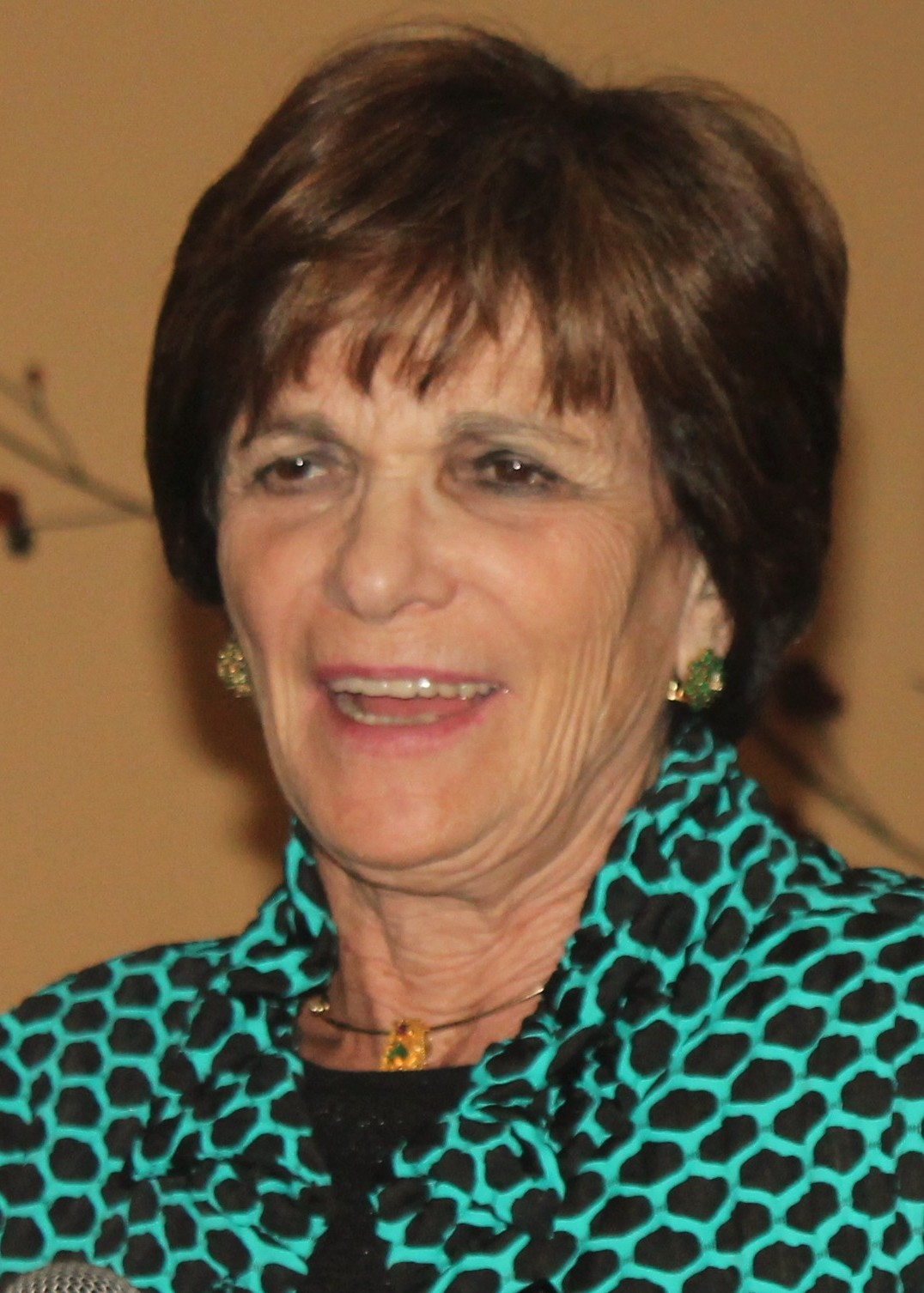
Kitty Dukakis

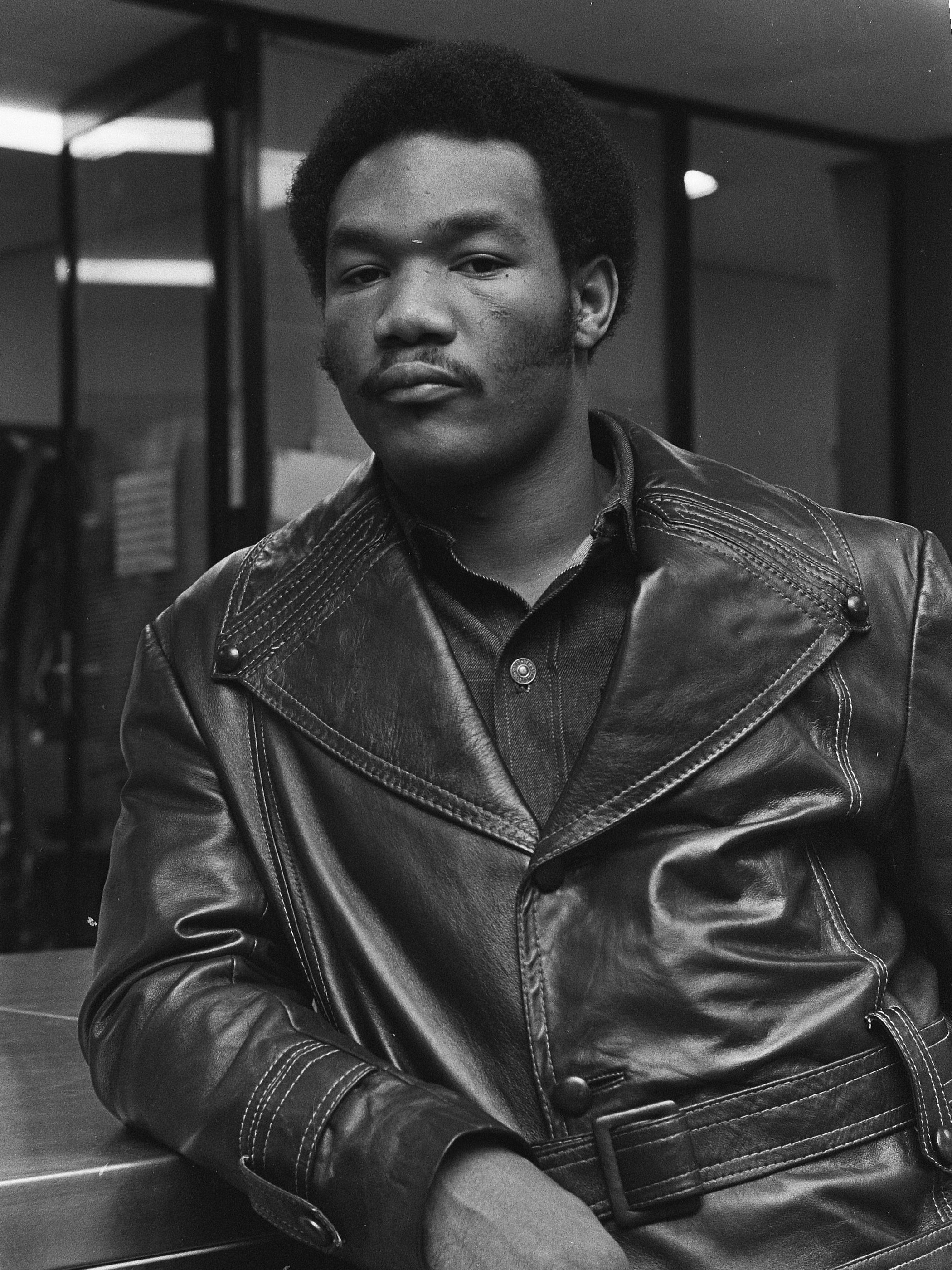
George Foreman

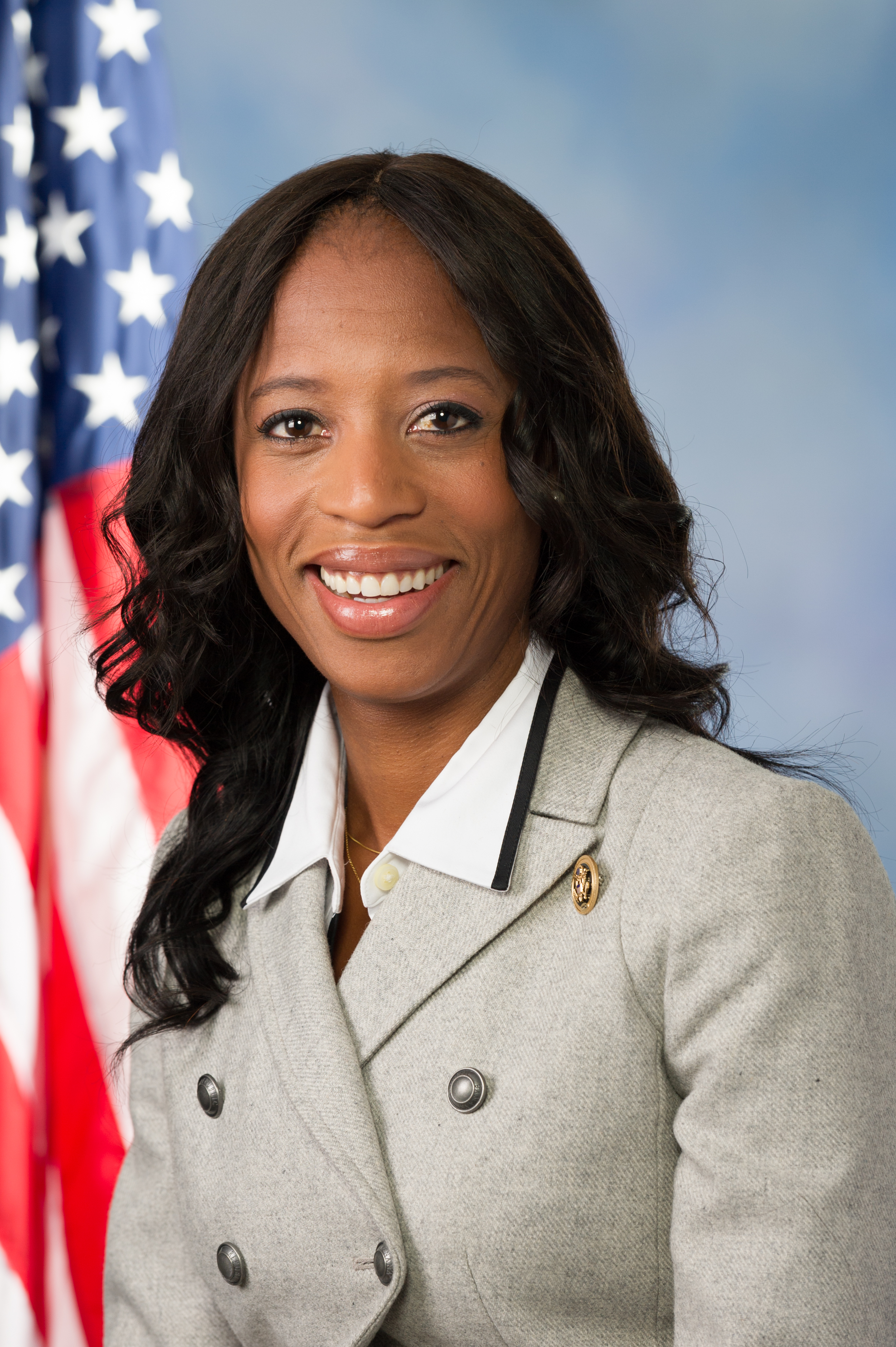
Mia Love

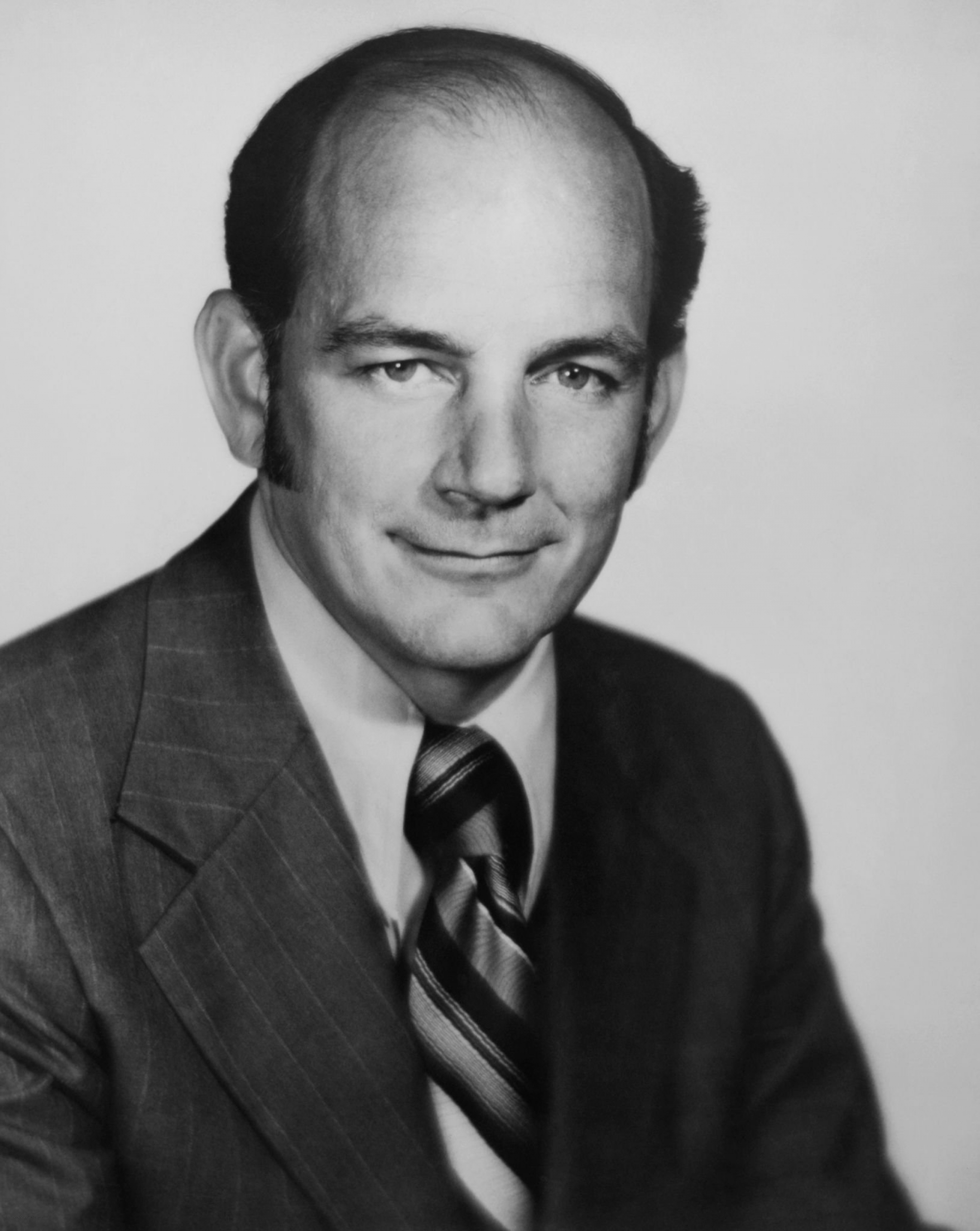
J. Bennett Johnston

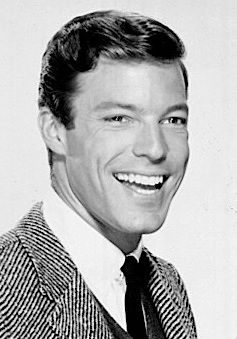
Richard Chamberlain

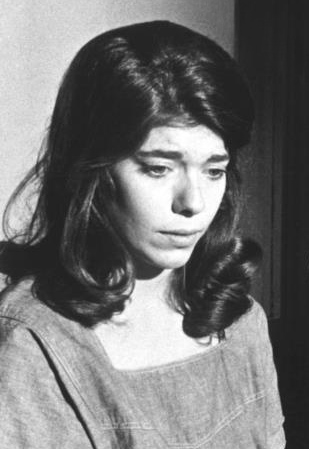
Sian Barbara Allen

- March 1
  - Merrill Douglas, 88, football player (Chicago Bears, New York Jets, Philadelphia Eagles) (b. 1936)
  - Hazel Nell Dukes, 92, civil rights activist, president of the NAACP (1990–1992) (b. 1932)
  - Bunky Green, 91, jazz alto saxophonist (b. 1933)
  - Robert T. Kuhn, 87, publicist and church leader (b. 1937)
  - John Curtis Perry, 94, historian and scholar (b. 1930)
  - Angie Stone, 63, singer ("No More Rain (In This Cloud)", "Wish I Didn't Miss You") and rapper (The Sequence) (b. 1961)
- March 2
  - Felicia Minei Behr, 83, television producer (All My Children) (b. 1942)
  - Marc Boutte, 55, football player (Los Angeles Rams, Washington Redskins) (b. 1969)
  - Flo Fox, 79, street photographer (b. 1945)
  - George Lowe, 67, voice actor (Space Ghost Coast to Coast, Aqua Teen Hunger Force, Robot Chicken) (b. 1957)
  - Kee Malesky, 74, author and research librarian (b. 1950)
  - Marysa Navarro, 90, Spanish-born historian (b. 1934)
- March 3
  - Sonny Arguinzoni, 85, author and pastor (b. 1939)
  - Carl Dean, 82, businessman (b. 1942)
  - Lincoln Díaz-Balart, 70, Cuban-born politician, member of the U.S. House of Representatives (1993–2011) (b. 1954)
  - Dore Gold, 71, American-Israeli political scientist and diplomat, permanent representative of Israel to the UN (1997–1999) (b. 1953)
  - Herb Greene, 82, photographer (b. 1942)
  - Jeffrey Runnings, 61, musician (For Against) and songwriter (b. 1963/1964)
  - Bob Rupe, 68, musician (The Silos, Cracker, Sparklehorse) (b. 1956/1957)
  - Frank Saucier, 98, baseball player (St. Louis Browns) (b. 1926)
- March 4
  - Roy Ayers, 84, musician and composer ("Everybody Loves the Sunshine") (b. 1940)
  - Robert G. Clark Jr., 96, politician, member of the Mississippi House of Representatives (1968–2003) (b. 1928)
  - Harry Elston, 86, singer (The Friends of Distinction) (b. 1938)
  - Peter Engel, 88, television producer (Saved by the Bell, City Guys, Hang Time) (b. 1936)
  - Jack Kibbie, 95, politician, member of the Iowa Senate (1965–1969, 1989–2013) and House of Representatives (1960–1964) (b. 1929)
  - Joe Nickell, 80, skeptic (The Bondwoman's Narrative) and paranormal investigator (b. 1944)
  - Selwyn Raab, 90, journalist (The New York Times) (b. 1934)
  - Roses In May, 25, racehorse (b. 2000)
  - José Valdivielso, 89, Cuban-born baseball player (Washington Senators / Minnesota Twins) (b. 1934)
  - Gene Winfield, 97, automotive customizer (Blade Runner) (b. 1927)
- March 5
  - Denise Alexander, 85, actress (Days of Our Lives, General Hospital, Another World) (b. 1939)
  - Pamela Bach, 61, actress (Baywatch) (b. 1963)
  - Randy Brown, 72, R&B singer (b. 1952) (death announced on this date)
  - DJ Funk, 53, musician and producer (b. 1971) (death announced on this date)
  - Ewald Heer, 94, aerospace engineer (b. 1930)
  - Daniel Rovero, 87, politician, member of the Connecticut House of Representatives (2011–2019) (b. 1937)
  - Sylvester Turner, 70, politician, Mayor of Houston (2016–2024) and U.S. Congressman from Texas (2025) (b. 1954)
- March 6
  - Mike Battle, 78, football player (New York Jets) and actor (C.C. and Company) (b. 1946)
  - Art Schallock, 100, baseball player (New York Yankees, Baltimore Orioles) (b. 1924)
  - Ricardo Scofidio, 89, architect (b. 1935)
  - Troy Seals, 86, country singer-songwriter and guitarist (b. 1938)
- March 7
  - Robert Bender, 88, politician, member of the Michigan House of Representatives (1983–1995) (b. 1936)
  - Danny Cox, 81, singer and songwriter (b. 1943)
  - Kevin Drum, 66, journalist and blogger (Mother Jones) (b. 1958)
  - Joan Dye Gussow, 96, food writer and academic (b. 1946)
  - Edward F. Harrington, 91, lawyer (b. 1933)
  - Armand LaMontagne, 87, sculptor (b. 1938)
  - Brad Sigmon, 67, convicted murderer (b. 1957)
  - Norris Thomas, 70, football player (Miami Dolphins, Tampa Bay Buccaneers) (b. 1954)
  - D'Wayne Wiggins, 64, guitarist (Tony! Toni! Toné!) (b. 1961)
- March 8
  - Michael Armacost, 87, diplomat, ambassador to Japan (1989–1993) and the Philippines (1982–1984), acting secretary of state (1989).
  - Beau Dozier, 45, songwriter and record producer (b. 1979)
  - Mark Klein, 79, technician and whistleblower (b. 1945/1946)
  - K. W. Lee, 96, journalist, founding president of the Korean American Journalists Association (b. 1928)
  - Al Matthews, 77, football player (Green Bay Packers) (b. 1947)
  - Nota Schiller, 88, American-born Israeli rabbi (b. 1937)
  - L. J. Smith, 66, author (The Vampire Diaries) (b. 1958)
- March 9
  - George Battle, 77, Methodist bishop (b. 1947)
  - Larry Buendorf, 87, security officer (United States Olympic Committee) and Secret Service agent (attempted assassination of Gerald Ford in Sacramento) (b. 1937)
  - Alexander Forger, 102, civil rights lawyer (b. 1923)
- March 10
  - Anthony R. Dolan, 76, journalist and political speechwriter (b. 1948)
  - Stanley R. Jaffe, 84, film producer (Kramer vs. Kramer, Fatal Attraction, The Bad News Bears), Oscar winner (1980) (b. 1940)
  - Thomas V. McComb, 88, American politician, member of the Indiana House of Representatives (1966–1970) and Senate (1970–1974).
  - John Taffin, 85, author (b. 1939)
  - Andy Wolfe, 99, basketball player (California Golden Bears) (b. 1925)
  - Craig Wolfley, 66, football player (Pittsburgh Steelers) (b. 1958)
- March 11
  - Junior Bridgeman, 71, basketball player (Milwaukee Bucks, Los Angeles Clippers) and businessman (b. 1953)
  - Mark Dobies, 65, actor (One Life to Live) (b. 1959)
  - Billie Jean Floyd, 95, politician, member of the Oklahoma Senate (1984–1988) (b. 1929)
  - Dave Mallow, 76, voice actor (Mighty Morphin Power Rangers, Digimon, World of Warcraft) (b. 1948)
  - Janet Metcalf, 89, politician, member of the Iowa House of Representatives (1985–2003) (b. 1935)
  - Bob Rivers, 68, Hall of Fame radio personality (KISW, KJR) and parody musician (Twisted Christmas) (b. 1956)
  - Robert Trebor, 71, actor (Hercules: The Legendary Journeys) (b. 1953)
- March 12
  - Mary Cirelli, 85, politician, member of the Ohio House of Representatives (2001–2004) (b. 1939)
  - Bruce Glover, 92, actor (Diamonds Are Forever, Chinatown, Hard Times) (b. 1932)
  - Oliver Miller, 54, basketball player (Phoenix Suns, Detroit Pistons, Toronto Raptors) (b. 1970)
  - Ron Nessen, 90, government official and journalist, White House press secretary (1974–1977) (b. 1934)
  - Felice Picano, 81, author (Ambidextrous) (b. 1944)
  - Linda Williams, 79, film scholar (b. 1946)
  - Witold-K, 92, Polish-born artist (b. 1932)
- March 13
  - Jim Breazeale, 75, baseball player (Atlanta Braves, Chicago White Sox) (b. 1949)
  - John Feinstein, 69, sportswriter and commentator (b. 1955)
  - Raúl Grijalva, 77, politician, U.S. Congressman from Arizona (2003–2025) (b. 1948)
  - Mark Holder, 52, blues musician (Black Diamond Heavies) (b. 1972)
  - Jeffrey Bruce Klein, 77, journalist (Mother Jones) (b. 1948)
  - David Schmittlein, 69, academic administrator, dean of the MIT Sloan School of Management (2007–2024) (b. 1955)
- March 14
  - Fred Eversley, 83, sculptor (b. 1941)
  - Ken Hall, 89, football player (Edmonton Eskimos, Chicago Cardinals, Houston Oilers) (b. 1935) (death announced on this date)
  - Virginia Newell, 107, academic, author and politician (b. 1917)
  - Red Lerille, 88, bodybuilder (b. 1936)
  - Alan Simpson, 93, politician, member of the U.S. Senate (1979–1997) and the Wyoming House of Representatives (1965–1977) (b. 1931)
- March 15
  - Alex Daoud, 81, attorney, politician and convicted felon, mayor of Miami Beach, Florida (1985–1991) (b. 1943)
  - Saul Fenster, 91, academic administrator, president of the New Jersey Institute of Technology (1978–2002) (b. 1933)
  - Paul Flatley, 84, football player (Minnesota Vikings, Atlanta Falcons) (b. 1941)
  - Wings Hauser, 77, actor (Tough Guys Don't Dance, The Siege of Firebase Gloria, Vice Squad) (b. 1947)
  - Nita Lowey, 87, politician, U.S. Congressman from New York (1989–2021) (b. 1937)
  - Malcolm F. Marsh, 96, jurist, judge of the U.S. District Court for Oregon (since 1987) (b. 1928)
  - James Murphy, 88, soccer player (St. Louis Kutis, national team) and sheriff of St. Louis (1988–2016) (b. 1936)
  - Slick Watts, 73, basketball player (Seattle SuperSonics, Houston Rockets) (b. 1951)
- March 16
  - Darwin L. Booher, 82, politician, member of the Michigan House of Representatives (2005–2010) and Senate (2011–2018) (b. 1942)
  - Thomas V. Chema, 78, academic administrator, president of Hiram College (2003–2013) (b. 1946)
  - Lawrence L. Koontz Jr., 85, jurist, Justice of the Supreme Court of Virginia (1995–2011) (b. 1940)
  - Bob Long, 83, football player (Green Bay Packers, Atlanta Falcons, Los Angeles Rams) (b. 1941)
  - Greg Makowski, 68, soccer player (Atlanta Chiefs, St. Louis Steamers, national team) (b. 1956)
  - Lenny Schultz, 91, stand-up comedian (b. 1933)
  - Samuel Sommers, 49, psychologist (b. 1975/1976)
  - Burton Tansky, 87, retail executive (Bergdorf Goodman), president and CEO of Neiman Marcus (2001–2010) (b. 1937)
  - Jesse Colin Young, 83, singer-songwriter (The Youngbloods) (b. 1941)
- March 17
  - Marty Callner, 78, television director (Hard Knocks) (b. 1946)
  - David Steven Cohen, 58, television writer (Courage the Cowardly Dog, Parker Lewis Can't Lose) and screenwriter (Balto) (b. 1966/1967)
  - Derrick Gaffney, 69, football player (New York Jets) (b. 1955)
- March 18
  - Nadia Cassini, 76, American-born Italian actress (Il dio serpente, Starcrash, La dottoressa ci sta col colonnello) (b. 1949)
  - John T. Casteen III, 81, academic administrator, president of the University of Connecticut (1985–1990) and the University of Virginia (1990–2010), Virginia secretary of education (1982–1985) (b. 1943)
  - Jessie Hoffman Jr., 46, convicted murderer (b. 1978)
  - Kanzi, 44, bonobo, subject of advanced linguistic aptitude (b. 1980)
  - Marshall Rauch, 102, politician, member of the North Carolina Senate (1967–1990) (b. 1923)
- March 19
  - George Bell, 67, basketball player (Harlem Wizards, Harlem Globetrotters), tallest man in the United States (b. 1957) (death announced on this date)
  - Aaron Gunches, 53, convicted murderer (b. 1971)
  - Don Wesely, 70, politician, mayor of Lincoln, Nebraska (1999–2003) and member of the Nebraska Legislature (1979–1999) (b. 1954)
- March 20
  - Eddie Adcock, 86, bluegrass banjo player (The Country Gentlemen) (b. 1938)
  - Norm Clarke, 82, journalist (Las Vegas Review-Journal) (b. 1942)
  - Bob Davis, 80, sportscaster (b. 1945)
  - Eddie James, 63, convicted murderer and rapist (b. 1961)
  - Ralph Munro, 81, politician, secretary of state of Washington (1981–2001) (b. 1943)
  - Matt Stevens, 51, football player (Philadelphia Eagles, Washington Redskins, New England Patriots) (b. 1973)
- March 21
  - Robert D'Andrea, 91, politician member of the New York State Assembly (1975–2003).
  - Kitty Dukakis, 88, author and political figure, first lady of Massachusetts (1975–1979, 1983–1991) (b. 1936)
  - George Foreman, 76, boxer, Olympic champion (1968) and entrepreneur (George Foreman Grill) (b. 1949)
  - Vernon Hatton, 89, basketball player (Cincinnati Royals, Philadelphia Warriors, St. Louis Hawks) (b. 1936)
  - Kenneth Sims, 65, football player (New England Patriots, Buffalo Bills) (b. 1959)
  - Larry Tamblyn, 82, singer and keyboardist (The Standells) (b. 1943)
- March 22
  - Jessica Aber, 43, lawyer, U.S. Attorney for Eastern District of Virginia (2021–2025) (b. 1981)
  - Frank Chopp, 71, politician, member of the Washington House of Representatives (1995–2025) (b. 1953)
  - Joe Goode, 87, painter (b. 1937)
  - David Hartsough, 84, Quaker peace activist, co-founder of Nonviolent Peaceforce (b. 1940)
  - James Laube, 73, wine connoisseur and critic (Wine Spectator) (b. 1971/1972)
  - Dennis McDougal, 77, author (Angel of Darkness) and newspaper journalist (b. 1947)
  - Bill Mercer, 99, sportscaster (North Texas Mean Green, WCCW) and news reporter (assassination of John F. Kennedy) (b. 1926)
- March 23
  - Ed Barker, 90, politician, member of the Georgia State Senate (1973–1991) (b. 1935)
  - Steve Charnovitz, 71, legal scholar (b. 1953)
  - Max Frankel, 94, journalist (The New York Times) (b. 1930)
  - Dean L. Hubbard, 85, academic administrator, president of Northwest Missouri State University (1984–2009) (b. 1939)
  - Sam Keen, 93, author and philosopher (b. 1931)
  - Mia Love, 49, politician, member of the U.S. House of Representatives (2015–2019) (b. 1975)
  - Barbara Neski, 97, architect (b. 1928)
  - Dave Pelz, 85, golf coach (b. 1939)
- March 24
  - Michael Boudin, 85, jurist, judge (1992–2021) and chief judge (2001–2008) of the U.S. Court of Appeals for the First Circuit and judge of the U.S. District Court for the District of Columbia (1990–1992) (b. 1939)
  - Dick Carlson, 84, journalist (Voice of America) and diplomat, ambassador to Seychelles (1991–1992) (b. 1941)
  - Roe Messner, 89, building contractor (Heritage USA, World Harvest Church, Calvary Church) (b. 1935)
  - Susan Tose Spencer, 83, businesswoman and football executive (Philadelphia Eagles) (b. 1941)
  - Huey Williams, 86, gospel singer (Jackson Southernaires) (b. 1938)
- March 25
  - Denis Arndt, 86, actor (Basic Instinct, How to Make an American Quilt, S.W.A.T.) (b. 1938)
  - Andrew Cohen, 69, spiritual teacher and author (b. 1955)
  - J. Bennett Johnston, 92, politician, member of the U.S. Senate (1972–1997) (b. 1932)
  - David Kristol, 86, academician (b. 1938)
  - Terry Manning, 77, recording engineer (Led Zeppelin III, Let's Stay Together, Eliminator), record producer, and musician (b. 1947)
  - Robert W. McChesney, 72, professor and author (b. 1952)
  - Eric Minkin, 74, American-Israeli basketball player (Maccabi Tel Aviv, Hapoel Galil Elyon, Israeli national team) (b. 1950)
  - Alice Tan Ridley, 72, gospel and R&B singer (b. 1952)
  - Hank Steinbrecher, 77, soccer coach and executive (b. 1947)
- March 26
  - Ray Barra, 95, ballet dancer (Stuttgart Ballet) and choreographer (Berlin State Ballet, Spanish National Dance Company) (b. 1930)
  - David Childs, 83, architect (One World Trade Center) (b. 1941)
  - Donald Dewsbury, 85, psychologist and historian (b. 1939)
  - Carole Keeton Strayhorn, 85, politician, mayor of Austin (1977–1983), railroad commissioner (1994–1999) and comptroller of Texas (1999–2007) (b. 1939)
  - Thomas F. Schutte, 89, academic administrator, president of Pratt Institute (1993–2017), the Rhode Island School of Design (1983–1992), and the Philadelphia College of Art (1975–1982) (b. 1935)
  - Wes Watkins, 86, politician, member of the Oklahoma Senate (1974–1976) and U.S. House of Representatives (1977–1991, 1997–2003) (b. 1938)
- March 27
  - Hy Eisman, 98, comic artist and writer (Archie Comics, Little Lulu, Popeye) (b. 1927)
  - Marcia Marcus, 97, figurative artist (b. 1928)
  - Shaka Ssali, 71, Ugandan-born journalist (Voice of America) (b. 1953)
- March 28
  - Susan Owens, 75, jurist, associate justice of the Washington Supreme Court (2001–2024) (b. 1949)
  - Young Scooter, 39, rapper (b. 1986)
- March 29
  - Richard Chamberlain, 90, actor (Dr. Kildare, Shōgun, The Thorn Birds) and singer (b. 1934)
  - Nancy Bea Hefley, 89, Dodger Stadium organist (b. 1936)
  - Robert E. Jones, 97, jurist, judge of the U.S. District Court for Oregon (since 1990) and Oregon Supreme Court (1983–1990) (b. 1927)
- March 30
  - Mark McCormick, 91, judge, justice of the Iowa Supreme Court (1972–1986) (b. 1933)
  - Jim Quinn, 82, conservative radio talk show host (WYSL, WJFA) (b. 1943)
- March 31
  - Sian Barbara Allen, 78, actress (You'll Like My Mother, Billy Two Hats, The Waltons) (b. 1946)
  - Patty Maloney, 89, actress (The Ice Pirates, The Addams Family, Star Wars Holiday Special) (b. 1936)
  - Tim Mohr, 55, German-born writer and editor (b. 1969/1970)
  - John Nelson, 83, conductor (b. 1941)
  - Bill O'Neill, 68, politician, member of the New Mexico Senate (2013–2024) (b. 1956/1957)
