= Deaths in March 2025 =

The following is a list of notable deaths in March 2025.

Entries for each day are listed alphabetically by surname. A typical entry lists information in the following sequence:

- Name, age, country of citizenship at birth, subsequent country of citizenship (if applicable), reason for notability, cause of death (if known), and reference.

== March 2025 ==
=== 1 ===
- Paula Alvarellos, 62, Spanish politician and lawyer, mayor of Lugo (since 2024), heart attack.
- Nugzar Bagration-Gruzinsky, 74, Georgian prince, throne claimant and theatre director, head of the House of Gruzinsky (since 1984).
- Asoma Banda, 92, Ghanaian businessman and philanthropist.
- Donald L. Bryant Jr., 82, American businessman.
- Susantha Chandramali, 61, Sri Lankan actress (Gamane Yaa), cancer.
- Alva Colquhoun, 83, Australian swimmer, Olympic silver medalist (1960).
- Rosemary Crowley, 86, Australian politician, minister assisting the prime minister for the status of women (1993) and senator (1983–2002).
- Aubrey Daniels, 89, American behavioral scientist.
- Bill Dare, 64, English television producer and writer (Dead Ringers, The Now Show, Spitting Image), traffic collision.
- Merrill Douglas, 88, American football player (Chicago Bears, New York Jets, Philadelphia Eagles).
- Hazel Nell Dukes, 92, American civil rights activist, president of the NAACP (1990–1992).
- Marged Esli, 75, Welsh actress (Pobol y Cwm).
- Steve Fleet, 87, English football player (Wrexham, Stockport County) and manager (ÍBV).
- Bunky Green, 91, American jazz alto saxophonist.
- Elvi Hale, 94, British actress (The Six Wives of Henry VIII, True as a Turtle, The Heroes of Telemark).
- Nico Hidalgo, 32, Spanish footballer (Recreativo Granada, Cádiz, Racing de Santander), lung cancer.
- Pat Ingoldsby, 82, Irish poet and television presenter, subject of The Peculiar Sensation of Being Pat Ingoldsby.
- Vladimir Krpan, 87, Croatian pianist.
- Tim Kruger, 44, German pornographic film actor and director, domestic accident.
- Robert T. Kuhn, 87, American publicist and church leader.
- Ajith Kumar, 72, Indian wildlife biologist.
- Michael L. Kurtz, 83, American historian.
- Tullio Lanese, 78, Italian football referee.
- Jiří Liška, 75, Czech politician, member (1996–2010) and vice-president (2004–2010) of the Senate.
- Monta Mino, 80, Japanese television presenter (Quiz $ Millionaire), complications from asphyxiation.
- Joey Molland, 77, English guitarist (Badfinger) and songwriter ("Love Is Easy", "Love Is Gonna Come at Last"), complications from diabetes.
- Miguel Otero Lathrop, 94, Chilean politician and diplomat, senator (1991–1998).
- Paulito FG, 63, Cuban salsa and timba musician, traffic collision.
- Mark Pawson, 60, British artist.
- John Curtis Perry, 94, American historian and scholar.
- Saša Popović, 70, Serbian musician and businessman.
- Meena Prabhu, 85, Indian writer and anaesthesiologist.
- Fulco Pratesi, 90, Italian environmentalist, journalist and politician, deputy (1992–1994).
- Flor Procuna, 72, Mexican actress (Los ricos también lloran).
- Alan Self, 80, Australian footballer (South Melbourne).
- Angie Stone, 63, American singer ("No More Rain (In This Cloud)", "Wish I Didn't Miss You") and rapper (The Sequence), traffic collision.
- Amadu Sulley, Ghanaian civil servant, deputy chairman of the Electoral Commission (2012–2018).
- Jack Vettriano, 73, Scottish painter (The Singing Butler).
- Leon Williams, 102, American politician, San Diego City Council member (1968–1982), San Diego County Board of Supervisors supervisor (1982–1994), cardiac arrest.
- Pedro Zarraluki, 70, Spanish writer.

=== 2 ===
- Edip Akbayram, 74, Turkish singer, multiple organ failure.
- Felicia Minei Behr, 83, American television producer (All My Children, Ryan's Hope, As the World Turns), brain cancer.
- Dieuwertje Blok, 67, Dutch actress, writer, and television presenter (Het Sinterklaasjournaal), cancer.
- Dennis Bond, 77, English footballer (Watford, Charlton Athletic, Tottenham Hotspur).
- Gérard Bourgoin, 85, French sports executive, president of AJ Auxerre (2011–2013) and Ligue de Football Professionnel (2000–2002).
- Marc Boutte, 55, American football player (Los Angeles Rams, Washington Redskins).
- Colin Burdett, 94, Australian Olympic basketball player (1956).
- Demos Christou, 87–88, Cypriot archaeologist.
- John Cummins, 82, Canadian politician, MP (1993–2011).
- Ray De Gruchy, 92, British footballer (Grimsby Town, Chesterfield).
- Flo Fox, 79, American street photographer.
- Roger Gyles, 86, Australian judge (Federal Court of Australia).
- Herbert Léonard, 80, French singer, lung cancer.
- George Lowe, 67, American voice actor (Space Ghost Coast to Coast, Aqua Teen Hunger Force, Robot Chicken), complications following heart surgery.
- Frank Maher, 90, Canadian musician.
- Kee Malesky, 74, American author and research librarian.
- Juan Margallo, 84, Spanish actor (Dragon Rapide, Solitary Fragments) and theatre director, complications from a fall.
- Marysa Navarro, 90, Spanish-American historian.
- Olle Petrusson, 81, Swedish biathlete, Olympic bronze medalist (1968; 1972).
- Gabrielle Rikihana, 98, New Zealand educator.
- Buvaisar Saitiev, 49, Russian freestyle wrestler and politician, Olympic champion (1996, 2004, 2008), MP (2016–2021), fall.
- Himmat Shah, 91, Indian sculptor.
- Bruno Dias Souza, 99, Indian architect.
- Bernhard Vogel, 92, German politician, minister-president of Rhineland-Palatinate (1976–1988) and of Thuringia (1992–2003), twice president of the Bundesrat.
- Peter Wall, 87, Ukrainian-born Canadian real estate developer.

=== 3 ===
- Kathryn Apanowicz, 64, British actress (Angels, EastEnders) and television presenter (Calendar).
- Sonny Arguinzoni, 85, American author and pastor.
- Sir John Ashworth, 86, British scientist.
- Edo Benetti, 83, Australian footballer (Richmond).
- Peter Bevilacqua, 91, Italian-born Australian footballer (Carlton).
- Henryk Bielski, 90, Polish film director (Pastorale heroica).
- Randy Brown, 72, American R&B singer.
- Victor Cicansky, 90, Canadian sculptor.
- Luigi Conti, 87, Italian Olympic long-distance runner (1960).
- Lincoln Díaz-Balart, 70, Cuban-American politician, member of the U.S. House of Representatives (1993–2011), cancer.
- Peter Eyre, 85, English cricketer (Derbyshire).
- Zbigniew Eysmont, 75, Polish politician, MP (1991–1993, 2000–2001) and member of the Masovian Voivodeship Sejmik (1998–2002).
- Walter Fahrer, 85, Argentine comic book writer.
- Tom Farer, 89, American academic administrator and author, president of University of New Mexico (1985–1986) and dean of the Josef Korbel School of International Studies (1996–2010).
- Dan Gawrecki, 81, Czech historian.
- Robert Emmett Ginna Jr., 99, American magazine editor and film producer.
- Eleonora Giorgi, 71, Italian actress (Talcum Powder, To Forget Venice, Inferno) and film director, pancreatic cancer.
- Dore Gold, 71, American-Israeli political scientist and diplomat, permanent representative of Israel to the UN (1997–1999).
- Herb Greene, 82, American photographer.
- Geraint Jarman, 74, Welsh musician, poet and television producer.
- Ghulam Muhammad Lakho, 70, Pakistani historian and academic.
- Nancy Lapp, 95, American archaeologist and biblical scholar.
- Sébastien Lepetit, 55, French crime fiction writer, colorectal cancer.
- Jean-Marie Londeix, 92, French saxophonist.
- Jozef Markuš, 80, Slovak politician, deputy prime minister (1989–1990), president of Matica slovenská (1990–2010).
- Carol McNicoll, 81, English studio potter.
- John McTavish, 93, Scottish footballer (Manchester City, St Mirren, Stranraer).
- Craig Richard Nelson, 77, American actor (The Paper Chase, 3 Women, Friends and Lovers).
- Jaroslav Nikodým, 74, Czech Olympic judoka.
- Antoine Saad, 87, Lebanese politician, MP (2005–2018).
- Sunil Satpal Sangwan, 77, Indian politician, Haryana MLA (1996–2001, 2009–2014, since 2024), liver cancer.
- Frank Saucier, 98, American baseball player (St. Louis Browns).
- Padmakar Shivalkar, 84, Indian cricketer (Bombay).
- Felicia Țilea-Moldovan, 57, Romanian four-time Olympic javelin thrower.
- Jean Van Leeuwen, 87, American children's author, cancer.
- Robert Vavra, 89, American photographer.
- Woo Chia-wei, 87, Hong Kong physicist and academic administrator, president of HKUST (1991–2001) and SFSU (1983–1988).

=== 4 ===
- Roy Ayers, 84, American musician and composer (Everybody Loves the Sunshine).
- Margaret Brazier, 74, British academic.
- Robert G. Clark Jr., 96, American politician, member of the Mississippi House of Representatives (1968–2003).
- Jorge Contreras, 88, Chilean Olympic rower (1956).
- Stephen Custer, 81, American classical cellist (Los Angeles Philharmonic).
- Jean-Louis Debré, 80, French judge and politician, president of the Constitutional Council (2007–2016) and of the National Assembly (2002–2007), minister of the interior (1995–1997).
- Walter A. Elwell, 87, American academician.
- Peter Engel, 88, American television producer (Saved by the Bell, City Guys, Hang Time).
- DJ Funk, 53, American musician and producer, cancer.
- Dave Gillespie, 90, New Zealand rugby union player (Otago, Wellington, national team).
- Oleg Gordievsky, 86, Russian-British double agent.
- Perla Tabares Hantman, 88, Cuban-born American school board member.
- Mickey Harmon, 40, American visual artist, graphic designer and queer activist, blunt force trauma to the head.
- Cássio de Jesus, 35, Brazilian footballer (Semen Padang, Kelantan, Barito Putera), aplastic anemia.
- Raymond Kelley, 87, American cellist and record producer.
- Jack Kibbie, 95, American politician, member of the Iowa Senate (1965–1969, 1989–2013) and House of Representatives (1960–1964).
- Wolfgang Leu, 80, Austrian Olympic modern pentathlete (1968, 1972).
- Laura L. Lovett, 63, American professor.
- Nandalala, 69, Indian poet.
- Joe Nickell, 80, American skeptic (The Bondwoman's Narrative) and paranormal investigator.
- Jerzy Pasiński, 77, Polish politician, mayor of Gdańsk (1989–1990).
- Jean-Louis Pichon, 76, French theatre director. (body discovered on this date)
- Selwyn Raab, 90, American journalist (The New York Times) and author, inspiration for Kojak, intestinal complications.
- Ciclón Ramirez, 64, Mexican professional wrestler (CMLL, IWRG), heart attack.
- Harold Reitman, 74, American orthopedic surgeon, heart disease.
- Eugénie Rocherolle, 88, American composer and pianist (Souvenirs du château).
- Roses In May, 25, American racehorse.
- Affonso Romano de Sant'Anna, 87, Brazilian writer.
- Mario Trabucco, 73, Italian violinist.
- José Valdivielso, 89, Cuban-American baseball player (Washington Senators / Minnesota Twins).
- Gene Winfield, 97, American automotive customizer (Blade Runner, RoboCop, The Last Starfighter), cancer.
- Serhiy Zhuravlyov, 65, Ukrainian footballer (Dynamo Kyiv, Zorya Luhansk, national team).

=== 5 ===
- Edesio Alejandro, 66, Cuban singer, guitarist and composer (Clandestinos, Hello Hemingway), cancer.
- Denise Alexander, 85, American actress (Days of Our Lives, General Hospital, Another World).
- Christopher Allsopp, 83, British economist.
- Pamela Bach, 61, American actress (Baywatch), suicide by gunshot.
- S. K. Bagga, 71, Indian politician, Delhi MLA (since 2015).
- Jean-Claude Barreau, 91, French essayist and writer.
- Eduardo Cruickshank Smith, 67, Costa Rican politician, member (since 2018) and president (2020–2021) of the Legislative Assembly, heart disease.
- Altin Çuko, 50, Albanian footballer (KS Lushnja, FK Tomori, KF Laçi).
- Sandra Harding, 89, American philosopher.
- Ewald Heer, 94, American aerospace engineer.
- Norberto Huezo, 68, Salvadoran footballer (Atlético Marte, Palencia, national team), complications from a stroke.
- Ove Johansson, 81, Swedish Olympic weightlifter (1968, 1972).
- Zoya Kornilova, 85, Russian politician, MP (1995–1999).
- Friso Meeter, 89, Dutch politician, member of the Senate (1997–1999).
- Bruno Pizzul, 86, Italian footballer (Catania, Cremonese) and journalist (RAI).
- Daniel Rovero, 87, American politician, member of the Connecticut House of Representatives (2011–2019).
- Alan Soble, 78, American philosopher and author.
- Pavel Staněk, 97, Czech conductor and composer.
- Fred Stolle, 86, Australian Hall of Fame tennis player, cancer.
- Charles Tart, 87, American psychologist and parapsychologist.
- Sylvester Turner, 70, American politician, member of the U.S. House of Representatives (since 2025), mayor of Houston (2016–2024).
- Terry Wilson, 83, Canadian football player (Calgary Stampeders, Edmonton Eskimos).
- Haruo Yoshimuta, 85, Japanese Olympic swimmer (1960, 1964), heart failure.

=== 6 ===
- Mohiuddin Ahmed, 88, Bangladeshi diplomat.
- Australian Suicide, 32, Australian professional wrestler (AAA), cardiac arrest.
- Mike Battle, 78, American football player (New York Jets) and actor (C.C. and Company).
- Meredith Belbin, 98, British researcher (Team Role Inventories) and management consultant.
- Walter Bucher, 98, Swiss Olympic cyclist (1948).
- Dušan Čaplovič, 78, Slovak politician, minister of education (2012–2014), MP (2002–2020).
- Dick Cherry, 87, Canadian ice hockey player (Philadelphia Flyers, Boston Bruins).
- Henri Duez, 87, French Olympic cyclist (1960).
- Lee Grodzins, 98, American physicist.
- Brian James, 70, English punk rock guitarist (The Damned, The Lords of the New Church) and songwriter ("New Rose").
- Krzysztof Kononowicz, 62, Polish political activist.
- Domingo Massaro, 97, Chilean Olympic footballer (1952).
- Klaus Richtzenhain, 90, German athlete, Olympic silver medalist (1956). (death announced on this date)
- Crystal-Donna Roberts, 40, South African actress (Arendsvlei, The Endless River, Chronicle), breast cancer.
- Olavi Salonen, 91, Finnish Olympic middle-distance runner (1960, 1964).
- Art Schallock, 100, American baseball player (New York Yankees, Baltimore Orioles).
- Ricardo Scofidio, 89, American architect.
- Troy Seals, 86, American singer-songwriter.
- Mabel Segun, 95, Nigerian writer and poet.
- Iftikhar Ahmed Sirohey, 89–90, Pakistani admiral, chief of the naval staff (1986–1988) and chairman of the joint chiefs of staff committee (1988–1991).
- Ray Snowball, 92, English footballer (Darlington).
- Árpád Sopsits, 72, Hungarian film director (Strangled).
- William Harry Stodalka, 93, Canadian politician, Saskatchewan MLA (1975–1978).
- Brian Windley, 89, British geologist.

=== 7 ===
- Akpovi Akoègninou, 74–75, Beninese botanist and academic.
- Oumarou Malam Alma, 73, Nigerien politician, MP (since 2021).
- Robert Bender, 88, American politician, member of the Michigan House of Representatives (1983–1995).
- Danny Cox, 81, American singer and songwriter.
- Kevin Drum, 66, American journalist and blogger (Mother Jones), cancer.
- Chinmaya Dunster, 71, British sarod player.
- Richard Fortey, 79, British palaeontologist (Life: A Natural History of the First Four Billion Years of Life on Earth), natural historian and television presenter.
- Luís Carlos Galter, 77, Brazilian footballer (Corinthians, Flamengo, national team), kidney disease.
- Joan Dye Gussow, 96, American food writer and academic, heart failure.
- Edward F. Harrington, 91, American lawyer, judge of the U.S. District Court for Massachusetts (since 1988).
- Rachel Herbert, 90, British actress (Crown Court, The House of Eliott, The Doctor and the Devils).
- Rifaat Hussain, 72, Pakistani political scientist and defence analyst.
- Răzvan Ionilă, 43, Romanian football player (CF Braila, Petrolul Ploiești, Fortuna Covaci) and manager.
- Stephen Jessel, 81, British newsreader and reporter.
- Hagen Kleinert, 82, German physicist.
- Armand LaMontagne, 87, American sculptor.
- Pamela Mabini, 46, South African human rights activist and whistleblower, shot.
- Doyin Okupe, 72, Nigerian physician and politician, cancer.
- Jürgen Piepenburg, 83, German football player (1. FC Frankfurt) and manager.
- Danny van Rossem, 89, Dutch Olympic fencer (1960).
- Oleksiy Shubin, 49, Ukrainian footballer (Vedrich Rechitsa, Torpedo Zaporizhzhia, Cherkasy), drone strike. (death announced on this date)
- Brad Sigmon, 67, American convicted murderer, execution by firing squad.
- Doug Specht, 83, Canadian football player (Ottawa Rough Riders).
- Norris Thomas, 70, American football player (Miami Dolphins, Tampa Bay Buccaneers).
- Wally Ursuliak, 95, Canadian curler, world champion (1961).
- Thitisan Utthanaphon, Thai police officer and convicted killer, suicide.
- Sergei Vostokov, 79, Russian mathematician.
- Sir David Vunagi, 74, Solomon Islands Anglican prelate and politician, governor-general (2019–2024) and archbishop and prelate of Melanesia (2009–2017).
- D'Wayne Wiggins, 64, American musician (Tony! Toni! Toné!) and songwriter ("Feels Good"), bladder cancer.
- Ted Wills, 91, American baseball player (Boston Red Sox, Cincinnati Reds, Chicago White Sox).

=== 8 ===
- Pavel Androsov, 70, Russian military officer, major general, commander of the 37th Air Army (2007–2009), cardiac arrest.
- Michael Armacost, 87, American diplomat, ambassador to Japan (1989–1993) and the Philippines (1982–1984), acting secretary of state (1989).
- Bill Ashton, 88, British jazz musician and composer.
- Ayo-Maria Atoyebi, 80, Nigerian Roman Catholic prelate, bishop of Ilorin (1992–2019).
- Khasan Bakayev, 66, Russian historian.
- Philippe Bär, 96, Dutch Roman Catholic prelate, bishop of Rotterdam (1983–1993).
- Oscar Calderon, 73, Filipino police officer, chief of the Philippine National Police (2006–2007) and director-general of the Bureau of Corrections (2007–2010).
- A. H. M. Touhidul Anowar Chowdhury, 87, Bangladeshi gynaecologist and obstetrician.
- Eung-Do Cook, 90, Canadian linguist.
- Simonne Creyf, 78, Belgian politician, senator (1991–1995), MP (1995–2007).
- Giles Daniels, 83, English cricketer (Combined Services, Gloucestershire).
- Rudy Diamond, 66, Costa Rican-born American professional wrestler (WWF).
- Beau Dozier, 45, American songwriter and record producer. (death announced on this date)
- Athol Fugard, 92, South African playwright (The Road to Mecca, Blood Knot, "Master Harold"...and the Boys) and political activist.
- Ed Grimsley, 61, American football player (Indianapolis Colts).
- Donald Hazelwood, 95, Australian violinist.
- Harbans Jandu, Indian lyricist.
- Mark Klein, 79, American technician and whistleblower, pancreatic cancer.
- K. W. Lee, 96, American journalist, founding president of the Korean American Journalists Association.
- Faumuina Tiatia Liuga, 79, Samoan politician, MLA (2001–2021), minister of finance (2011–2014). (death announced on this date)
- Al Matthews, 77, American football player (Green Bay Packers).
- Isabel Miranda de Wallace, 73, Mexican social activist.
- Attila Monostori, 54, Hungarian Olympic water polo player (1996).
- Giles Paxman, 73, British diplomat, ambassador to Mexico (2005–2009) and Spain (2009–2013), lung cancer.
- V. Ramaswami, 96, Indian jurist, judge of the Supreme Court (1989–1994) and chief justice of Punjab and Haryana High Court (1987–1989), cardiac arrest.
- Jan Rindfleisch, 82, American artist.
- Naima Samih, 71, Moroccan singer.
- Nota Schiller, 88, American-born Israeli rabbi.
- L. J. Smith, 66, American author (The Vampire Diaries, Night World, The Secret Circle), complications from granulomatosis with polyangiitis.
- Paolo Tantoco, 44, Filipino business executive (Rustan's), complications from cocaine toxicity.
- Carmen Vazquez Rivera, 103, Puerto Rican Air Force officer and nurse.
- Brian Waites, 85, English golfer, complications from Parkinson's disease.
- Ella Zeller, 91, Romanian table tennis player.

=== 9 ===
- George Battle, 77, American Methodist bishop.
- Eileen Bennett, 105, British actress (Thursday's Child, Much Too Shy, Trunk Crime).
- Narve Bjørgo, 88, Norwegian historian.
- Virginia Boucher, 95, American librarian.
- Bracito de Oro, 59, Mexican wrestler.
- Larry Buendorf, 87, American security officer (United States Olympic Committee) and Secret Service agent (attempted assassination of Gerald Ford in Sacramento).
- Simon Fisher-Becker, 63, British actor (Puppy Love, Harry Potter and the Philosopher's Stone, Doctor Who).
- Alexander Forger, 102, American civil rights lawyer.
- Andis Harasani, 53, Albanian politician and economist, MP (2005–2012).
- Rodney John Francis Henderson, 87, Australian botanist.
- King K. Holmes, 87, American physician and epidemiologist, kidney disease.
- Geoff Johnston, 80, British priest, archdeacon of Gibraltar (2014–2019).
- Hans Peter Korff, 82, German actor (Diese Drombuschs, Pappa Ante Portas, Beresina, or the Last Days of Switzerland).
- Taras Levkiv, 84, Ukrainian ceramic artist.
- Dick McTaggart, 89, Scottish boxer, Olympic lightweight champion (1956), complications from dementia.
- Lawrence B. Mohr, 93, American political scientist.
- Akinori Nakayama, 82, Japanese Hall of Fame gymnast, Olympic champion (1968, 1972), stomach cancer.
- Ricky Peters, 69, American baseball player (Detroit Tigers, Oakland Athletics).
- Garimella Balakrishna Prasad, 76, Indian classical musician and composer.
- Yola Ramírez, 90, Mexican tennis player.
- Aubrey Walshe, 91, Zimbabwean cricketer (Oxford University) and political scientist.

=== 10 ===
- Marjorie Agosín, 70, American writer, cancer.
- Natalya Akhrimenko, 69, Russian Olympic shot putter (1980, 1988).
- Kathan Brown, 89, American master printmaker.
- Sven Coomer, 84, Australian Olympic pentathlete (1956) and ski boot designer.
- Anthony R. Dolan, 77, American journalist and political speechwriter.
- Sir Francis Billy Hilly, 76, Solomon Islands politician, prime minister (1993–1994).
- Stanley R. Jaffe, 84, American film producer (Kramer vs. Kramer, Fatal Attraction, The Accused), Oscar winner (1980).
- Ljubomir Katić, 90, Serbian basketball player (Proleter Zrenjanin, Yugoslavia national team) and coach (Čelik Zenica).
- Helene Kulsrud, 91, American computer scientist, complications from a fall.
- Jesús Antonio Lerma Nolasco, 79, Mexican Roman Catholic prelate, auxiliary bishop of Mexico (2009–2019) and bishop of Iztapalapa (2019–2021).
- Carl Lundström, 64, Swedish businessman and political activist, plane crash.
- Robert McGinnis, 99, American illustrator.
- Marc Neil-Jones, 67, British-born Vanuatuan journalist.
- Stedman Pearson, 60, British singer (Five Star), complications from diabetes.
- B. Subbayya Shetty, 91, Indian politician, Karnataka MLA (1972–1983).
- Ada L. Smith, 79, American politician, member of the New York State Senate (1989–2006).
- Alfredo Stranieri, 68, Italian-French serial killer.
- John Taffin, 85, American author.
- Paul Wheeler, 90, British screenwriter (Caravan to Vaccarès) and novelist.
- Wheesung, 43, South Korean singer, cardiac arrest.
- Andy Wolfe, 99, American basketball player (California Golden Bears).
- Craig Wolfley, 66, American football player (Pittsburgh Steelers), cancer.

=== 11 ===
- Alekos Alexiadis, 79, Greek footballer (Aris, Panetolikos, national team).
- Uri Asaf, 78, Israeli poet and songwriter.
- Judy Bethel, 81, Canadian politician, MP (1993–1997).
- Junior Bridgeman, 71, American basketball player (Milwaukee Bucks, Los Angeles Clippers) and businessman.
- Bernard Bruand, 73, French Olympic rower (1972, 1976, 1980).
- David Burns, 66, American basketball player (New Jersey Nets, Denver Nuggets).
- Blanca Castilla de Cortázar Larrea, Spanish philosopher and theologian.
- Cocoa Tea, 65, Jamaican reggae singer and songwriter, cardiac arrest.
- Francesco Cuccarese, 95, Italian Roman Catholic prelate, archbishop of Acerenza (1979–1987) and Pescara-Penne (1990–2005), bishop of Caserta (1987–1990).
- Mark Dobies, 65, American actor (One Life to Live, Guiding Light).
- John Russell Evans, 89, Welsh lawn bowler.
- Billie Jean Floyd, 95, American politician, member of the Oklahoma Senate (1984–1988).
- Moshe Gariani, 67, Israeli footballer (Maccabi Netanya, Maccabi Tel Aviv, national team).
- Ayumi Ishida, 76, Japanese actress (Yaju-deka, Tokei – Adieu l'hiver, House on Fire) and singer, hypothyroidism.
- Dave Mallow, 76, American voice actor (Mighty Morphin Power Rangers, Digimon, World of Warcraft).
- Janet Metcalf, 89, American politician, member of the Iowa House of Representatives (1985–2003).
- Lloyd Ray Milliken, 93, American seafood entrepreneur.
- Georgi Yordanov Naydenov, 89, Bulgarian Olympic footballer.
- Norair Nurikyan, 76, Bulgarian weightlifter, Olympic champion (1972, 1976), cancer.
- Horst Paulmann, 89, German-born Chilean retailer, founder of Cencosud.
- Anthony Phelps, 96, Haitian-born Canadian writer.
- Clive Revill, 94, New Zealand actor (The Empire Strikes Back, Irma La Douce, Oliver!).
- Bob Rivers, 68, American Hall of Fame radio personality (KISW, KJR) and parody musician (Twisted Christmas), esophageal cancer.
- Witold Tomczak, 67, Polish politician, MP (1997–2004) and MEP (2004–2009).
- Robert Trebor, 71, American actor (Hercules: The Legendary Journeys, Raise Your Voice, Jiminy Glick in Lalawood), sepsis.
- William Weise, 96, American brigadier general.
- Ayako Yoshikawa, 92, Japanese Olympic long jumper (1952).

=== 12 ===
- Syed Abid Ali, 83, Indian cricketer (Hyderabad, national team).
- Michel Arrignon, 76, French clarinetist.
- Aleksandr Baranov, 78, Russian military officer.
- Mary Cirelli, 85, American politician, member of the Ohio House of Representatives (2001–2004), heart failure and kidney disease.
- Norbert Cyffer, 81, German-Austrian linguist.
- David Ehrenstein, 78, American critic.
- Syed Manzur Elahi, 83, Bangladeshi businessman.
- Mahmoud Farshidi, 73, Iranian politician, minister of education (2005–2007).
- John French, 94, Australian racing driver.
- Bruce Glover, 92, American actor (Diamonds Are Forever, Walking Tall, Chinatown).
- Ralph Holloway, 90, American anthropologist.
- Takashi Inagaki, 87, Japanese voice actor (Soul Eater, A Spirit of the Sun, Kingdom Hearts) and actor, pneumonia.
- Eduardo Nonato Joson, 74, Filipino politician, governor of Nueva Ecija (1995–1998) and member of the House of Representatives (1987–1992, 2007–2010).
- Billy Joyce, 75, Irish Gaelic footballer (Killererin, Galway).
- Jeffrey Kaplan, 70, American academic (Encyclopedia of White Power).
- Klaus Kobusch, 83, German track cyclist, Olympic bronze medalist (1964).
- Godfrey Lawrence, 92, Rhodesian cricketer (Rhodesia, South Africa).
- Billy McCombe, 76, Irish rugby union player (Bangor, Dublin University, national team).
- Fiona McHugh, 57, Irish journalist (The Sunday Times) and editor, cancer.
- Oliver Miller, 54, American basketball player (Phoenix Suns, Detroit Pistons, Toronto Raptors), cancer.
- Ron Nessen, 90, American government official and journalist, White House press secretary (1974–1977).
- Peggy Parnass, 97, German-Swedish actress (Nobody Loves Me), columnist and writer.
- Felice Picano, 81, American author (Ambidextrous), lymphoma.
- Jean Rice, 85, American homelessness activist.
- Walter Schwimmer, 82, Austrian politician and diplomat, secretary general of the Council of Europe (1999–2004).
- Tamilla Shiraliyeva, 78, Azerbaijani ballerina and ballet master, brain hemorrhage.
- Tabitha Siwale, 86, Tanzanian politician and educator.
- Maisie Trollette, 91, British drag queen.
- Linda Williams, 79, American film scholar.
- Witold-K, 92, Polish-American artist.

=== 13 ===
- Khalid Anwer, 86, Pakistani lawyer and jurist, minister of law and justice (1997–1999).
- Jim Breazeale, 75, American baseball player (Atlanta Braves, Chicago White Sox).
- Christopher Cherniak, 79, American neuroscientist.
- Lil Bahadur Chettri, 92, Indian novelist (Basain).
- Malachi Curran, 86, Northern Irish politician.
- William F. Durkin, 95, American politician, mayor of Waukegan, Illinois (1993–2001).
- W. Dean Eastman, 77, American educator and writer.
- John Feinstein, 69, American Hall of Fame sportswriter (The Washington Post, The Sporting News) and author (A Season on the Brink).
- John H. Flavell, 96, American developmental psychologist.
- Vincent Gillespie, 71, British scholar.
- Raúl Grijalva, 77, American politician, member of the U.S. House of Representatives (since 2003), lung cancer.
- Sofia Gubaidulina, 93, Russian composer (Offertorium, The Canticle of the Sun, Concerto for violin, cello and bayan), cancer.
- Thomas Hayes, 43, American boxer, traffic collision.
- Radiša Ilić, 47, Serbian footballer (Partizan, OFK Beograd, national team).
- Jeffrey Bruce Klein, 77, American journalist (Mother Jones).
- K. K. Kochu, 76, Indian writer and social activist, cancer.
- Einar Kringlen, 93, Norwegian psychiatrist.
- Ray Leigh, 96, British architect and designer.
- Sam Macaroni, 49, American actor (National Lampoon's TV: The Movie, Electric Apricot: Quest for Festeroo), film director (Guest House) and writer.
- Miguel Macedo, 65, Portuguese politician, MP (1987–2002, 2005–2015) and minister of internal administration (2011–2015), heart attack.
- Robin Matthews, 81, English cricketer (Oxfordshire, Leicestershire).
- Brian McMahon, 95, New Zealand venereologist and army officer.
- J. B. Moore, 81, American music producer.
- Edgar Oehler, 83, Swiss politician, MP (1971–1995).
- Valeriy Oseledets, 84, Russian mathematician.
- Mario Ramírez Treviño, 63, Mexican suspected drug trafficker.
- Zohra Rasekh, 56, Afghan doctor and women's rights activist. (death announced on this date)
- Anthimos Rousas, 91, Greek Orthodox bishop, Metropolitan of Thessaloniki (2004–2023).
- Pierluigi Sangalli, 83, Italian comic book artist (Geppo, Nonna Abelarda).
- David Schmittlein, 69, American academic administrator, dean of the MIT Sloan School of Management (2007–2024).
- Ben Scotti, 87, American football player (Washington Redskins, Philadelphia Eagles) and film producer (Eye of the Tiger).
- Ann Sexton, 78, American soul singer.
- A. A. M. S. Arefin Siddique, 71, Bangladeshi academic administrator, vice-chancellor of the University of Dhaka (2009–2017), stroke.
- Maria Grazia Spina, 88, Italian actress (Samson and the Slave Queen, Toto vs. the Black Pirate, Rugantino).
- Pamela Spitzmueller, 74, American conservator and book artist.
- Daniel W. Stroock, 84, American mathematician.
- Claude Verret, 61, Canadian ice hockey player (Buffalo Sabres, Trois-Rivières Draveurs, Rochester Americans).
- Clive Wilmer, 80, British poet.
- Yallunder, 30, South African singer.

=== 14 ===
- Werner Arnold, 89, German Olympic weightlifter (1960).
- Yehuda Ben-Meir, 85, American-born Israeli academic and politician, member of Knesset (1971–1984).
- Claude Dhinnin, 90, French politician, mayor of La Madeleine (1977–2008), deputy (1973–1981, 1986–1997).
- Fred Eversley, 83, American sculptor.
- Bogusław Gierajewski, 87, Polish Olympic sprinter (1960).
- Charles G. Groat, 84, American geologist.
- Ken Hall, 89, American football player (Edmonton Eskimos, Chicago Cardinals, Houston Oilers).
- Demyan Hanul, 31, Ukrainian activist (Right Sector), shot.
- Panchakshari Hiremath, 92, Indian writer, critic and translator.
- Peter Hric, 59, Slovak Olympic cyclist (1996).
- Broyce Jacobs, 84, Canadian politician, Alberta MLA (2001–2004, 2008–2012).
- Lothar John, 91, German motorcycle road racer.
- Abdul Ghani Kasuba, 73, Indonesian politician, governor of North Maluku (2019–2023).
- Andreas Kronthaler, 73, Austrian sport shooter, Olympic silver medalist (1984).
- Red Lerille, 88, American bodybuilder.
- Lin Tsan-ting, 94, Taiwanese cinematographer.
- Liu Hongru, 94, Chinese economist and banker.
- Deb Mukherjee, 83, Indian actor (Aansoo Ban Gaye Phool, Karate, Gudgudee).
- Virginia Newell, 107, American academic, author and politician.
- Leonard Polonsky, 97, British-American financial services entrepreneur and philanthropist.
- Bruno Romani, 65, Italian saxophonist.
- Manfred Schukowski, 97, German academic teacher and author of works on astronomical clocks.
- Alan Simpson, 93, American politician, member of the U.S. Senate (1979–1997) and the Wyoming House of Representatives (1965–1977), complications from a broken hip.
- Dag Solstad, 83, Norwegian author (Gymnaslærer Pedersens beretning om den store politiske vekkelse som har hjemsøkt vårt land) and dramatist.

=== 15 ===
- Wataru Asō, 85, Japanese politician, governor of Fukuoka Prefecture (1995–2011).
- Peter Bichsel, 89, Swiss writer and journalist.
- Les Binks, 73, Northern Irish Hall of Fame heavy metal drummer (Judas Priest).
- Marvin Cohen, 93, American writer.
- Alex Daoud, 81, American attorney, politician and convicted felon, mayor of Miami Beach, Florida (1985–1991).
- Bruce Dombolo, 39, French footballer (Pro Vasto, Marignane, Ancona) and actor.
- Rita Ellis, 74, American politician, mayor of Delray Beach, Florida (2007–2009).
- Bernie Fedderly, 83, Canadian drag racing crew chief.
- Saul Fenster, 91, American academic administrator, president of the New Jersey Institute of Technology (1978–2002).
- Doris Fitschen, 56, German footballer (TSV Siegen, Philadelphia Charge, national team).
- Paul Flatley, 84, American football player (Minnesota Vikings, Atlanta Falcons), sepsis.
- Ančka Gošnik Godec, 97, Slovene illustrator. (death announced on this date)
- Wings Hauser, 77, American actor (Tough Guys Don't Dance, The Siege of Firebase Gloria, Vice Squad), complications from COPD.
- Anita Huffington, 90, American sculptor.
- Filemona F. Indire, 95, Kenyan diplomat and politician, MP (1983–1988).
- Alain Jaubert, 84, French journalist, film director, and producer.
- Mike Kenning, 84, English footballer (Charlton Athletic, Shrewsbury Town, Norwich City).
- Hernán Lara Zavala, 79, Mexican novelist and literary critic.
- Nita Lowey, 87, American politician, member of the U.S. House of Representatives (1989–2021), breast cancer.
- Malcolm F. Marsh, 96, American jurist, judge of the U.S. District Court for Oregon (since 1987).
- Colin McFadyean, 82, English rugby union player (Moseley, national team, British Lions), pneumonia and sepsis.
- James Murphy, 88, American soccer player (St. Louis Kutis, national team) and sheriff of St. Louis (1988–2016).
- Elias Nozdrin, 93, Russian monk.
- Rajnikumar Pandya, 86, Indian writer and journalist.
- The Mad Peck, 83, American cartoonist.
- Cindy Pritzker, 101, American philanthropist.
- Delia Razon, 94, Filipino actress (Rodrigo de Villa, Gaano Kadalas ang Minsan?, Ipagpatawad Mo).
- Basil Rigg, 99, Australian cricketer (Perth Cricket Club, Western Australia).
- Wolf-Dieter Schneider, 82, German metallurgist.
- Lenny Schultz, 91, American stand-up comedian.
- Munir Shakir, 55, Pakistani Islamic cleric, founder of Lashkar-e-Islam, injuries sustained in bomb blast.
- Barbara Skrzypek, 66, Polish civil servant.
- Jimmy Neil Smith, 77, American storyteller.
- Pilar Viladas, 70, American writer, complications from amyotrophic lateral sclerosis.
- Slick Watts, 73, American basketball player (Seattle SuperSonics, New Orleans Jazz, Houston Rockets).

=== 16 ===
- AnNa R., 55, German singer (Rosenstolz, Gleis 8). (body discovered on this date)
- Judith Bailey, 83, British composer and clarinetist.
- Gavrilă Birău, 79, Romanian football player (UTA Arad, Aurul Brad) and manager (UTA Arad).
- Darwin L. Booher, 82, American politician, member of the Michigan House of Representatives (2005–2010) and Senate (2011–2018).
- Gordon H. Brown, 93, New Zealand art historian and curator.
- Thomas V. Chema, 78, American academic administrator, president of Hiram College (2003–2013).
- Gold Dagal, 38, Filipino comedian, shot.
- Robert Barney Dallenbach, 97, American bishop.
- Émilie Dequenne, 43, Belgian actress (Rosetta, Our Children, Not My Type), adrenocortical carcinoma.
- Jon Durham, 59, English footballer (Torquay United, Rotherham United). (death announced on this date)
- Fang Weizhong, 97, Chinese politician, chairman of the Committee for Economic Affairs (1993–2003).
- Bindu Ghosh, 76, Indian actress (Kozhi Koovuthu, Uruvangal Maralam, Thoongathey Thambi Thoongathey) and choreographer.
- William Hayes, 94, British physicist and academic administrator, president of St. John's College, Oxford (1987–2001).
- Tom Hinsby, 79, Danish Olympic rower.
- Rasheed Ijaodola, Nigerian legal practitioner.
- Don Kitchenbrand, 91, South African footballer (Rangers, Sunderland).
- Tomáš Klouček, 45, Czech ice hockey player (New York Rangers, Nashville Predators, Atlanta Thrashers), skiing accident.
- Lawrence L. Koontz Jr., 85, American jurist, justice of the Virginia Supreme Court (1995–2011).
- Doug Laughton, 80, English rugby league player (Widnes, Lancashire, Great Britain national team) and coach.
- Andrej Lazarov, 25, Macedonian footballer (GFK Tikvesh, NK Rudeš, KF Shkupi), smoke inhalation.
- Li Deping, 98, Chinese radiation physicist.
- Bob Long, 83, American football player (Green Bay Packers, Washington Redskins, Atlanta Falcons).
- Greg Makowski, 68, American soccer player (Atlanta Chiefs, St. Louis Steamers, national team).
- Arvind Singh Mewar, 80, Indian royal and hotelier, chairman of HRH Group of Hotels (since 1984).
- Jean Mongrédien, 92, French musicologist.
- Rob de Nijs, 82, Dutch singer and actor (Hamelen), complications from Parkinson's disease.
- Ramakanta Rath, 90, Indian modernist poet.
- Fernando Sátiro, 87, Brazilian footballer (São Paulo, Fortaleza).
- Samuel Sommers, 49, American psychologist.
- Burton Tansky, 87, American retail executive (Bergdorf Goodman), president and CEO of Neiman Marcus (2001–2010), cancer.
- Vincent van der Merwe, 41–42, South African conservationist, suicide.
- Alex Wheatle, 62, British novelist, prostate cancer.
- Dik Wolfson, 91, Dutch economist (International Monetary Fund, International Institute of Social Studies), civil servant and politician, senator (1999–2003).
- Jesse Colin Young, 83, American singer (The Youngbloods) and songwriter ("Darkness, Darkness").

=== 17 ===
- Oscar M. Babauta, 70, Northern Mariana Islander politician, speaker of the House of Representatives (2006–2008).
- Perry Bard, 80, Canadian interdisciplinary artist. (death announced on this date)
- Marty Callner, 78, American television director (Hard Knocks).
- César di Candia, 95, Uruguayan journalist and writer.
- Monique Andréas Esoavelomandroso, 79, Malagasy politician, secretary general of the Indian Ocean Commission (2004–2008).
- Ger FitzGerald, 60, Irish hurler (Midleton, Cork).
- John Fraser, 88, Scottish footballer (Hibernian, Stenhousemuir). (death announced on this date)
- Derrick Gaffney, 69, American football player (New York Jets).
- Mankombu Gopalakrishnan, 77, Indian lyricist, heart attack.
- John Hemingway, 105, Irish RAF pilot (Battle of Britain).
- Abu Ishaq al-Huwayni, 68, Egyptian Islamic cleric, stroke.
- Ana Ivanova, 51, Paraguayan actress (The Heiresses).
- Ray Landorf, 87, Australian footballer (South Melbourne).
- Uno Laur, 63, Estonian singer.
- Lee Shau-kee, 97, Hong Kong real estate investor, founder of Henderson Land Development.
- Aurelio Martínez, 55, Honduran musician and politician, plane crash.
- Günther Michl, 74, German footballer (FC Bayern Munich, 1. FC Nürnberg, 1. FC Saarbrücken).
- Branislava Peruničić, 88, Bosnian engineer.
- Debendra Pradhan, 83, Indian politician, MP (1999–2004).
- Pemmaraju Sreenivasa Rao, 83, Indian lawyer.
- Peter Sedgley, 94, English visual artist, co-founder of Space Studios.
- Shu Shengyou, 88, Chinese politician, governor of Jiangxi (1995–2001).
- Mario De Silva, 89, Italian Olympic wrestler.
- John James Snow Jr., 95, American politician, member of the South Carolina House of Representatives (2001–2004).
- Naseer Soomro, 55, Pakistani airline employee, tallest man in Pakistan, chronic lung disease.
- Hannes Tretter, 73, Austrian lawyer and human rights expert.
- H. Rutherford Turnbull, 87, American author and educator.
- Gheorghe Vărzaru, 64, Romanian rugby union player (Steaua București, national team).
- Hocine Zehouane, 89, Algerian politician.

=== 18 ===
- Abu Hamza, Palestinian militant, spokesperson for the Al-Quds Brigades (since 2019), airstrike.
- Nels Ackerson, 80, American lawyer and policy advocate.
- Edwin Borja, 66, Filipino Olympic swimmer (1972, 1976), traffic collision.
- Denise Boucher, 89, Canadian writer.
- Andy Cassell, 82, British sailor, Paralympic champion (1996).
- Nadia Cassini, 76, American-Italian actress (Il dio serpente, Starcrash, La dottoressa ci sta col colonnello).
- John T. Casteen III, 81, American academic administrator, president of the University of Connecticut (1985–1990) and the University of Virginia (1990–2010), Virginia secretary of education (1982–1985).
- Paul Cremona, 79, Maltese Roman Catholic prelate, archbishop of Malta (2007–2014).
- Issam al-Da'alis, 58, Palestinian politician, airstrike.
- Angus Edghill, 79, British-born Barbadian Olympic swimmer (1968).
- Sonia Garmers, 92, Curaçaoan writer.
- Antonio Gasalla, 84, Argentine actor (Waiting for the Hearse, The Truce), comedian, and theatre director.
- Abdul Rahman Haji Ahmadi, 84, Iranian Kurdish politician.
- Reinaldo Herrera, 91, Venezuelan-American socialite and journalist.
- Jessie Hoffman Jr., 46, American convicted murderer, execution by nitrogen hypoxia.
- Kanzi, 44, American bonobo.
- Hannu Karpo, 83, Finnish reporter and television presenter.
- Yōko Kawanami, 67, Japanese voice actress (Dragon Ball Z, Video Warrior Laserion, Powerpuff Girls Z), cancer.
- Bedros Kirkorov, 92, Bulgarian-Russian singer.
- Jacob Korevaar, 102, Dutch mathematician.
- Édouard Niankoye Lamah, 79, Guinean politician, minister of foreign affairs (2010–2012) and of health (2018–2019).
- Fedor Malykhin, 34, Russian ice hockey player (Avtomobilist Yekaterinburg, Traktor Chelyabinsk, Spartak Moscow).
- Wlamir Marques, 87, Brazilian basketball player, Olympic bronze medallist (1960, 1964).
- Jean Michel, 76, French politician, MP (1997–2012).
- Marshall Rauch, 102, American politician, member of the North Carolina Senate (1967–1990).
- John E. Rooney, 85, American politician, member of the New Jersey General Assembly (1983–2010).
- Aviva Semadar, 89, Israeli folklore and chanson singer.
- André de Souza, 89, French Olympic boxer (1956).
- Don Wesely, 70, American politician, member of the Nebraska Legislature (1979–1999), mayor of Lincoln (1999–2003).

=== 19 ===
- Kåre Aasgaard, 91, Norwegian footballer (Åssiden, national team).
- Eddie Adcock, 86, American bluegrass banjo player (The Country Gentlemen).
- Hafiz Hussain Ahmed, 73–74, Pakistani Islamic scholar and politician, MP (1988–1990, 2002–2007).
- George Bell, 67, American basketball player (Harlem Wizards, Harlem Globetrotters), tallest man in the United States.
- Pedro Cuatrecasas, 88, American biochemist (Wolf Prize in Medicine).
- Calistrat Cuțov, 76, Romanian boxer, Olympic bronze medallist (1968). (body discovered on this date)
- Andrija Delibašić, 43, Montenegrin footballer (Partizan, Rayo Vallecano, national team), cancer.
- Robert Denhardt, 82–83, American educator.
- Costa Gazi, 88, South African anti-apartheid activist.
- Hernán Godoy, 83, Chilean football player (Deportes La Serena) and manager (Audax Italiano, Santiago Morning), liver cancer.
- Carlos González Cepeda, 75–76, Spanish businessman and politician, member of the Corts Valencianes (1991–1996).
- Ann D. Gordon, 80, American historian, heart attack.
- Arnold Greenberg, 91, American businessman.
- Aaron Gunches, 53, American convicted murderer, execution by lethal injection.
- Sam Keen, 93, American author and philosopher.
- Cláudio Lembo, 90, Brazilian lawyer, politician and university professor, governor of São Paulo (2006–2007).
- Athanase Matti Shaba Matoka, 95, Iraqi Syriac Catholic hierarch, auxiliary bishop (1979–1983) and archbishop (1983–2010) of Baghdad for the Syrians.
- Sir Torquil Norman, 91, British businessman and arts philanthropist.
- Werner Otto, 96, German footballer (1. FC Saarbrücken, Saarland national team).
- Gordon Reid, 82, Scottish Anglican priest, dean of Gibraltar (1997–2000).
- Tommie Reynolds, 83, American baseball player (Kansas City/Oakland Athletics, California Angels, New York Mets).
- Ellen Ringier, 73, Swiss publisher.
- Eisaku Satō, 85, Japanese politician, governor of Fukushima Prefecture (1988–2006) and member of the House of Councillors (1983–1998).
- Kazi Shahidullah, 72, Bangladeshi academic administrator, vice-chancellor of NU (2009–2013) and chairman of the UGC (2019–2024), cancer.
- Vasile Simionaș, 74, Romanian football player (Politehnica Iași, national team) and manager (Oțelul Galați). (death announced on this date)
- Cynthia Soto, 62, American politician, member of the Illinois House of Representatives (2001–2019).
- John Swales, 86–87, English linguist.
- William Taylor, 80, British barrister, judge, and university chairman.
- Anna Turbau, 75, Spanish photojournalist.
- Peder Widding, 94, Norwegian politician, MP (1977–1981).
- Zhao Yanxia, 97, Chinese opera singer.

=== 20 ===
- Peter Brockhoff, 88, Australian Olympic alpine skier (1960, 1964).
- Norm Clarke, 82, American journalist (Las Vegas Review-Journal), cancer.
- Bill Cottrell, 80, American football player (Detroit Lions, Denver Broncos).
- Bob Davis, 80, American sportscaster (Kansas Jayhawks, Kansas City Royals).
- Patrick Dineen, 87, Irish cricketer (Cork County, national team) and businessman.
- Donald Evenson, 84, American biologist and chemist.
- Nona Faustine, 48, American photographer and visual artist.
- Graham Flight, 88, Canadian politician, Newfoundland and Labrador MHA (1975–1982, 1985–1987, 1989–1999).
- Vitold Fokin, 92, Ukrainian politician, prime minister (1990–1992).
- Afdera Franchetti, 93, Italian socialite.
- Yuki Furuta, 82, Japanese judge, pneumonia.
- Norton Garfinkle, 94, American economist and businessman.
- Mark Geier, 76, American physician.
- Wendell Grissom, 56, American convicted murderer, execution by lethal injection.
- Guo Jiaxuan, 18, Chinese footballer. (death announced on this date)
- Eddie James, 63, American convicted murderer and rapist, execution by lethal injection.
- Eddie Jordan, 76, Irish Formula One team owner (Jordan Grand Prix) and television presenter (Top Gear), prostate and bladder cancer.
- François Labande, 83, French mountaineer, ecologist, and writer.
- Pat MacLachlan, 96, Scottish rugby union player (London Scottish, Barbarians, national team).
- Francis Matthey, 82, Swiss politician, mayor of La Chaux-de-Fonds (1980–1988) and member of the Swiss National Council (1987–1995).
- Ralph Munro, 81, American politician, secretary of state of Washington (1981–2001).
- Pat Murphy, 62, Canadian politician, mayor of Alberton (2004–2006) and Prince Edward Island MLA (2007–2019).
- A. T. Raghu, 75, Indian film director (Ajay Vijay, Mysore Jaana).
- K. R. Rajagopal, 74, Indian-American mechanical engineer.
- Osman Sınav, 68, Turkish film director (Uzun Hikâye), producer and screenwriter, cancer.
- Matt Stevens, 51, American football player (Buffalo Bills, Philadelphia Eagles, New England Patriots), Super Bowl champion (2002).
- Rico Suave, 54, Puerto Rican wrestler and manager (World Wrestling Council), heart failure.
- Renée Van Hoof-Haferkamp, 96, German politician.

=== 21 ===
- Shmuel Agmon, 103, Israeli mathematician (Agmon's inequality).
- Filiz Akın, 82, Turkish actress (Birds of Exile, Tatlı Dillim, Karateci Kız).
- Émile Blessig, 77, French politician, MP (1998–2012).
- Giuliano Boffardi, 79, Italian politician, senator (1992–1994), deputy (1994–1996).
- Robert D'Andrea, 91, American politician, member of the New York State Assembly (1975–2003), complications from cardiac amyloidosis.
- Fabrizio Di Somma, 54, Italian cyclist, Paralympic silver medallist (2000).
- Kitty Dukakis, 88, American author and social activist, first lady of Massachusetts (1975–1979, 1983–1991), complications from dementia.
- Charles Syrett Farrell Easmon, 78, British microbiologist, cancer.
- Evert Endt, 91, French designer.
- Parvaneh Etemadi, 77, Iranian visual artist.
- Eliyahu Fink, 43, American Orthodox rabbi, traffic collision.
- George Foreman, 76, American boxer (two-time world heavyweight champion), Olympic champion (1968) and businessman (George Foreman Grill).
- Giancarlo Guerrini, 85, Italian water polo player, Olympic champion (1960).
- Vern Hatton, 89, American basketball player (Cincinnati Royals, Philadelphia Warriors, St. Louis Hawks).
- Kalimanto Tulus Widodo, 59, Indonesian Olympic cyclist (1992), heart attack.
- John Kirby, 76, British artist.
- Štefan Kvietik, 90, Slovak actor (The Boxer and Death, The Millennial Bee, Sitting on a Branch, Enjoying Myself).
- Tom Lowenstein, 83, English poet.
- Michel Moskovtchenko, 90, French painter, sculptor and illustrator.
- Rakesh Pandey, 76, Indian actor (Sara Aakash, Chotti Bahu), cardiac arrest.
- Filippo Maria Pandolfi, 97, Italian politician, deputy (1968–1988), minister of agriculture (1983–1988) and finance (1976–1978).
- Florin Popa, 71, Romanian politician, deputy (2016–2020).
- Terry Reilly, 77, Australian Olympic archer (1972, 1976).
- Jussi Rintamäki, 89, Finnish Olympic sprinter (1960).
- Devendra Sharma, 66, Indian politician, Odisha MLA (2014–2019).
- Kenneth Sims, 65, American football player (Texas Longhorns, New England Patriots, Buffalo Bills).
- Cirilo Tirado Delgado, 89, Puerto Rican politician, member of the House of Representatives of Puerto Rico (1973–1985), member of the senate (1988–1996).

=== 22 ===
- Jessica Aber, 43, American lawyer, U.S. attorney for Eastern District of Virginia (2021–2025), epileptic seizure.
- Gillian Baxter, 87, British author.
- Francesco Benozzo, 56, Italian poet and musician.
- Livingstone Bramble, 64, Saint Kitts and Nevis professional boxer, WBA lightweight champion (1984–1986).
- Svetlana Broz, 69, Bosnian author and physician.
- Frank Chopp, 71, American politician, member of the Washington House of Representatives (1995–2025).
- Alan Cuckston, 85, English harpsichordist, pianist and organist (BBC).
- Iván García Guerra, 87, Dominican theatre actor and playwright.
- Larisa Golubkina, 85, Russian actress (Hussar Ballad, Give Me a Book of Complaints, The Tale of Tsar Saltan).
- Joe Goode, 87, American painter.
- David Hartsough, 84, American Quaker peace activist, co-founder of Nonviolent Peaceforce.
- Sergey Kryuchek, 61, Russian politician, MP (2016–2021).
- James Laube, 73, American wine connoisseur and critic (Wine Spectator).
- Xavier Le Pichon, 87, French geophysicist.
- Asaf Lifshitz, 82, Israeli sculptor.
- Martin Loeb, 66, French actor (My Little Loves, Maladolescenza).
- Alexander Mashkevitch, 71, Israeli-Kazakh businessman and investor.
- Dennis McDougal, 77, American author (Angel of Darkness) and newspaper journalist, traffic collision.
- Bruce McGaw, 89, American painter.
- Djamel Menad, 64, Algerian football player (Nîmes, national team) and manager (USM Annaba).
- Bill Mercer, 99, American sportscaster (North Texas Mean Green, WCCW) and news reporter (assassination of John F. Kennedy).
- Geoffrey Nyarota, 74, Zimbabwean journalist, founder of Daily News, colon cancer.
- Kwesi Owusu, 70, Ghanaian writer and filmmaker.
- Andy Peebles, 76, English radio DJ (BBC Radio 1), television presenter (Top of the Pops) and cricket commentator.
- Rolf Schimpf, 100, German actor (Smuglere, Mensch Bachmann, Der Alte).
- D. R. Fraser Taylor, 87–88, Scottish-born Canadian cartographer, geographer, and academic.
- Angelo Todaro, 79, Italian comic book artist (Mandrake the Magician, Turok, Phantom).
- Alex Wyllie, 80, New Zealand rugby union player (Canterbury, national team) and coach (national team).
- Marvin York, 92, American politician, member of the Oklahoma House of Representatives (1969–1973) and Oklahoma Senate (1977–1987).

=== 23 ===
- Salah al-Bardawil, 65, Palestinian politician, member of the Palestinian Legislative Council (2006–2018), airstrike.
- Ed Barker, 90, American politician, member of the Georgia State Senate (1973–1991).
- Gianfranco Barra, 84, Italian actor (Banana Joe, I nuovi mostri, Bread and Chocolate).
- Maman Bolingo, 68, Congolese actress.
- Franciszek Bunsch, 98, Polish painter and graphic artist.
- Krishna Lal Chadha, 88, Indian horticultural scientist.
- Steve Charnovitz, 71, American legal scholar.
- Bogdan Daras, 64, Polish Olympic wrestler (1988).
- Joe Farago, 77, American actor (The Terminator, The Abyss) and game show host (Break the Bank).
- Max Frankel, 94, American journalist (The New York Times).
- Marcel Glesener, 87, Luxembourgish politician and trade unionist, deputy (1989–2004).
- Marianna Grznárová, 83, Slovak writer.
- Maria Gustafsson, 78, Swedish actress, television producer, and author (Un, dos, tres... responda otra vez).
- Valerie Howarth, Baroness Howarth of Breckland, 84, British social worker and life peer, member of the House of Lords (since 2001).
- Dean L. Hubbard, 85, American academic administrator, president of Northwest Missouri State University (1984–2009), kidney disease.
- Karl-Ludwig Kratz, 83, German nuclear chemist and astrophysicist.
- Lora Lamm, 97, Swiss illustrator and graphic designer.
- Henri Le More, 83, French sociologist and editor.
- Eugeniusz Lewacki, 99, Polish Olympic ice hockey player (1948, 1952).
- Mia Love, 49, American politician, member of the U.S. House of Representatives (2015–2019), glioblastoma.
- Pierre Mariétan, 89, Swiss composer.
- Barbara Neski, 97, American architect.
- Charles Strachey, 4th Baron O'Hagan, 79, British politician, MEP (1973–1975, 1979–1994), subdural hematoma.
- Dave Pelz, 85, American golf coach.
- Jean-Marius Raapoto, 82, French Polynesian educator, academic, and politician, member of the Assembly of French Polynesia (1986–1991, 2001–2013).
- Alexandr Rabotnitskii, 31, Russian athlete, Paralympic silver medalist (2020).
- Jesús Santos, 43, Spanish politician and trade unionist, member of the Assembly of Madrid (2021–2023), cancer.
- Hubert Schmalix, 72, Austrian painter.
- Ragnar Svensson, 90, Swedish Olympic wrestler (1960, 1964, 1968).
- Toru Terasawa, 90, Japanese Olympic distance runner (1964), heart failure.

=== 24 ===
- Vladimir Andreyev, 83, Russian military officer, commander of Air Defence Aviation of the Soviet and Russian Air Defence Forces (1987–1998), head of the Federal Air Transport Agency (1999–2000).
- Michael Boudin, 85, American jurist, judge (1992–2021) and chief judge (2001–2008) of the U.S. Court of Appeals for the First Circuit and judge of the U.S. District Court for the District of Columbia (1990–1992), complications from dementia and Parkinson's disease.
- Dick Carlson, 84, American journalist (Voice of America) and diplomat, ambassador to Seychelles (1991–1992).
- Gene Cichowski, 90, American football player (Washington Redskins, Pittsburgh Steelers).
- Edward Countryman, 80, American historian.
- Winston De Ville, 87, American historian and genealogist.
- Éric Eydoux, 85, French writer, academic, and cultural activist.
- Michael Friedman, 77, American philosopher.
- David Kristol, 86, American chemist and academic.
- Kuo Yao-chi, 69, Taiwanese politician, minister of transportation (2006), aortic dissection.
- Ron Leeson, 86, Australian politician, Western Australian MLA (1971–1983).
- Roe Messner, 89, American building contractor (Heritage USA, World Harvest Church, Calvary Church).
- Paul Petts, 63, English footballer (Bristol Rovers, Shrewsbury Town), cancer.
- Cyrill Ramkisor, 91, Surinamese politician.
- Rozik Boedioro Soetjipto, 81, Indonesian politician, minister of public works (1999–2000).
- Hossam Shabat, 23, Palestinian journalist, airstrike.
- Joan C. Sherman, 93, American chemist.
- Susan Tose Spencer, 83, American businesswoman and football executive (Philadelphia Eagles), complications from Alzheimer's disease.
- Fritz Streletz, 98, German army general.
- Kane Tologanak, 72–73, Canadian Inuk politician, Northwest Territories MLA (1979–1983).

=== 25 ===
- Juan Aguilera, 63, Spanish tennis player.
- Denis Arndt, 86, American actor (Heisenberg, Basic Instinct, S.W.A.T.).
- Syed Ali Ashrafi, Indian politician and Islamic scholar.
- Edith Ballantyne, 102, Czechoslovak-born Canadian peace activist, infection.
- Hans Baumann, 94, German-born American inventor and engineer.
- Manoj Bharathiraja, 48, Indian actor (Annakodi, Baby), film director (Margazhi Thingal), and producer.
- Andrew Cohen, 69, American spiritual teacher and author.
- Donald Crombie, 82, Australian film and television director (Caddie, Selkie, Tales of the South Seas).
- Christopher Ehret, 83, American scholar and historian.
- Shihan Hussaini, 60, Indian actor (Punnagai Mannan, Velaikkaran, Unnai Solli Kutramillai) and karateka, leukemia.
- Bjørn Johansen, 81, Norwegian Olympic ice hockey player (1968, 1972).
- J. Bennett Johnston, 92, American politician, member of the U.S. Senate (1972–1997), complications from COVID-19.
- Tapani Kansa, 76, Finnish singer, complications from gallbladder surgery.
- Sanjida Khatun, 91, Bangladeshi musicologist.
- Kim Hyuk-kyu, 85, South Korean politician, governor of South Gyeongsang Province (1993–2003) and member of the National Assembly (2004–2007).
- Gene Mangan, 88, Irish road racing cyclist.
- Terry Manning, 77, American recording engineer (Led Zeppelin III, Let's Stay Together, Eliminator), record producer, and musician, fall.
- Andrei Martemyanov, 61, Russian ice hockey player (HC CSKA Moscow, Soviet Union national team) and coach (Amur).
- Visvaldas Mažonas, 83, Lithuanian politician.
- Robert W. McChesney, 72, American media theorist and author.
- Don McCorkell, 77, American politician and filmmaker, member of the Oklahoma House of Representatives (1979–1996).
- Paul McDonough, 84, American photographer, complications from Alzheimer's disease.
- Eric Minkin, 74, American-Israeli basketball player (Maccabi Tel Aviv, Hapoel Galil Elyon, Israeli national team).
- Gananath Obeyesekere, 95, Sri Lankan anthropologist (Sahlins–Obeyesekere debate).
- Alexander Ollongren, 96, Dutch scientist (METI International, Lincos language, Yale University).
- Abdul Karim Al-Orrayed, 90–91, Bahraini artist.
- Rod Oshita, 65, American Olympic handball player (1984, 1988).
- Albert Pietersma, 89, Dutch-Canadian philologist and academic.
- Rahim Abdullah, 77, Malaysian footballer (Selangor, national team, 1972 Olympic team).
- Alice Tan Ridley, 72, American singer (America's Got Talent).
- Graham Roger Serjeant, 86, British medical researcher.
- Masahiro Shinoda, 94, Japanese film director (MacArthur's Children, Childhood Days, Moonlight Serenade) and screenwriter, pneumonia.
- Julio Simón, 84, Argentine police officer and convicted criminal.
- Hank Steinbrecher, 77, American soccer coach and executive, heart disease.
- William Steinkamp, 71, American film editor (Tootsie, Out of Africa, The Fabulous Baker Boys), cancer.
- François Trucy, 93, French politician, mayor of Toulon (1985–1995) and senator (1986–2014).
- Radu Țuculescu, 76, Romanian novelist, playwright, and theatre director.
- Peter Bernhard Weiss, 81, German historian and classical scholar.

=== 26 ===
- Paul Barnes, 85, British broadcaster.
- Ray Barra, 95, American ballet dancer (Stuttgart Ballet) and choreographer (Berlin State Ballet, Spanish National Dance Company).
- Rico Bianchi, 94, Swiss rower, Olympic silver medallist (1952).
- Manuel Hilario de Céspedes y García Menocal, 81, Cuban Roman Catholic prelate, bishop of Matanzas (2005–2022).
- David Childs, 83, American architect (One World Trade Center), complications from Lewy body dementia.
- Shushama Das, 94, Bangladeshi folk singer.
- Christa L. Deeleman-Reinhold, 94, Dutch arachnologist.
- Donald Dewsbury, 85, American psychologist and historian.
- Kerry Greenwood, 70, Australian author (Cocaine Blues, Death at Victoria Dock, The Broken Wheel).
- Rolf Groven, 82, Norwegian painter.
- John Herrick, 78, Irish football player (Cork Hibernians, national team) and manager (Galway United).
- Bożena Hilczer, 88, Polish physicist.
- Howie Hughes, 85, Canadian ice hockey player (Los Angeles Kings), congestive heart failure.
- László Jakabházy, 86, Hungarian Olympic ice hockey player (1964) and coach.
- Nicolas Kynaston, 83, English organist.
- Nick Lalich, 79, Australian politician, New South Wales MP (2008–2023) and mayor of Fairfield (2002–2012).
- Bentley Layton, 83, American religious scholar.
- Fafa Edrissa M'Bai, 82, Gambian lawyer and politician, attorney general (1982–1984, 1994–1995).
- Estelito Mendoza, 95, Filipino politician, minister of justice (1984–1986), governor of Pampanga (1980–1986), and solicitor general (1972–1986).
- Alastair Niven, 81, British literary scholar and author.
- Fuad Noman, 77, Brazilian politician, mayor of Belo Horizonte (since 2022), cardiopulmonary arrest.
- Karuppasamy Pandian, 76, Indian politician, Tamil Nadu MLA (1977–1984, 2006–2011).
- Jeff Potter, 83, Australian footballer (Port Adelaide).
- Thomas F. Schutte, 89, American academic administrator, president of Pratt Institute (1993–2017), the Rhode Island School of Design (1983–1992), and the Philadelphia College of Art (1975–1982).
- Charles Spiteri, 81, Maltese footballer (Valletta, Lija Athletic, national team).
- Carole Keeton Strayhorn, 85, American politician, mayor of Austin (1977–1983), railroad commissioner (1994–1999) and comptroller of Texas (1999–2007).
- Ferenc Szabó, 76, Hungarian Olympic judoka (1972).
- Masami Tanabu, 90, Japanese politician, MP (1979–1996, 1998–2010), minister of agriculture (1991–1993) and Olympic ice hockey player (1960, 1964), sepsis.
- Settimio Todisco, 100, Italian Roman Catholic prelate, archbishop of Brindisi-Ostuni (1975–2000).
- Antoni Trzaskowski, 83, Polish footballer (Legia Warsaw, Rochester Lancers, national team).
- Emmanuel Unuabonah, 50, Nigerian academic.
- Aleksei Veselkin, 63, Russian actor (Armavir) and media presenter.
- Tamás Wachsler, 59, Hungarian architect and politician, MP (1990–1998).
- Wes Watkins, 86, American politician, member of the Oklahoma Senate (1974–1976) and U.S. House of Representatives (1977–1991, 1997–2003), cardiac arrest.
- Stef Wertheimer, 98, German-born Israeli industrialist and politician, MK (1977–1981).
- Wijoto, 86, Indonesian politician, mayor of Kediri (1989–1999). (death announced on this date)

=== 27 ===
- Tomur Atagök, 85, Turkish artist and musicologist.
- Günter Benser, 94, German historian.
- Rosy Bremer, 53, British anti-war activist, complications from motor neurone disease.
- Kazimierz Dąbrowski, 89, Polish Olympic field hockey player (1960).
- Johann de Lange, 65, South African poet, short story writer, and critic.
- John Mark Dean, 88, American marine biologist.
- John Domini, 73–74, American author and translator.
- Hy Eisman, 98, American comic artist and writer (The Katzenjammer Kids, Little Lulu, Popeye).
- Raymundus Sau Fernandes, 52, Indonesian politician, regent of North Central Timor Regency (2010–2021), drowned.
- Michel Fontaine, 72, French politician, mayor of Saint-Pierre, Réunion (since 2001) and senator (2011–2017).
- Don Hall, 96, American sound editor (Butch Cassidy and the Sundance Kid, M*A*S*H, Patton).
- Brad Holland, 81, American artist, complications following heart surgery.
- Jemini the Gifted One, American rapper.
- Hans-Josef Klauck, 78, German Franciscan theologian and religious historian (University of Würzburg, University of Chicago Divinity School).
- Ku Feng, 94, Hong Kong actor (The Love Eterne, Between Tears and Laughter, Come Drink with Me).
- Peter Lever, 84, English cricketer (Lancashire, Tasmania, national team).
- Marcia Marcus, 97, American figurative artist.
- Christina McKelvie, 57, Scottish politician, MSP (since 2007), minister for culture (2023–2024) and drugs and alcohol policy (since 2024), breast cancer.
- Motleb bin Abdullah Al-Nafisah, 87–88, Saudi Arabian politician.
- Harikrishna Pathak, 86, Indian poet, short story writer, and editor.
- Abdallah Schleifer, 89–90, Egyptian-American academician.
- Wolfgang Schnarr, 83, German footballer (1. FC Kaiserslautern, SC Preußen Münster).
- Loretta Schrijver, 68, Dutch newsreader and television presenter, colon cancer.
- Karen Shaw, 83, American artist and museum curator.
- Shaka Ssali, 71, Ugandan-born American journalist (Voice of America).
- Yasuko Takemura, 91, Japanese politician, member of the House of Representatives (1983–1986).
- Ottó Tolnai, 84, Serbo-Hungarian writer, poet, and translator.
- Berkin Usta, 24, Turkish Olympic alpine skier (2022), injuries sustained in a fire.
- Märt Visnapuu, 62, Estonian actor.
- Peter Webster, 92, Australian footballer (Carlton).

=== 28 ===
- Alfredo, 78, Brazilian footballer (Palmeiras, Cruzeiro, national team).
- Peter Allsop, 79, British musicologist.
- Alexandru Bantoș, 74, Moldovian writer and journalist (Limba Română).
- Victoria Barr, 87, American painter.
- Orio Caldiron, 86, Italian film critic and historian.
- John E. Cunningham, 94, American politician, member of the Washington House of Representatives (1973–1975), Washington State Senate (1975–1977) and U.S. House of Representatives (1977–1979).
- Johann Eigenstiller, 81, Austrian footballer (SSW Innsbruck, SK Rapid Wien, national team).
- Hamza Feghouli, 86, Algerian actor (Le Clandestin).
- Hennadiy Horbenko, 49, Ukrainian Olympic hurdler (2000).
- Jim Johnson, 79, American news anchor and reporter.
- Ronald A. Katz, 89, American inventor and humanitarian.
- Alfredo Montoya Melgar, 87, Spanish jurist and academic, justice of the Constitutional Court (2017–2022).
- Juma Mwapachu, 82, Tanzanian politician, secretary-general of the East African Community (2006–2011).
- Vittorio Orsenigo, 98, Italian novelist.
- Armando Osma, 63, Colombian football player (Deportivo Cali, Deportes Tolima) and manager (Manta), heart attack.
- Susan Owens, 75, American jurist, associate justice of the Washington Supreme Court (2001–2024).
- Ruth Rudy, 87, American politician, member of the Pennsylvania House of Representatives (1983–1996).
- Najmuddin Shaikh, 85, Pakistani diplomat, foreign secretary (1994–1997).
- Eurico da Silva, 91, Indian judge, justice of the Bombay High Court (1990–1995).
- Bjørn Simensen, 77, Norwegian cultural administrator, director of the Norwegian National Opera and Ballet (1984–1990, 1997–2009).
- Heloísa Teixeira, 85, Brazilian writer, member of the Academia Brasileira de Letras.
- Evgeny Tertyshny, 90, Russian politician, people's deputy of the USSR (1989–1991).
- Olegario Vázquez Raña, 89, Mexican sports shooter and businessman, four-time Olympic competitor (1964–1976).
- Young Scooter, 39, American rapper, complications from a leg injury.

=== 29 ===
- Otuekong Raphael Bassey, Nigerian politician.
- Ken Bruen, 74, Irish crime fiction writer.
- Joan Brown Campbell, 93, American Christian minister and ecumenical leader.
- Peter Catt, 88, British plant breeder.
- Richard Chamberlain, 90, American actor (Dr. Kildare, The Thorn Birds, Shōgun), complications from a stroke.
- Dick Damron, 91, Canadian country singer and songwriter.
- Harrison Fagg, 93, American architect.
- Virgilio Garcillano, 87, Filipino civil servant.
- Simon González, 88, Puerto Rican Olympic sports shooter (1972).
- Nancy Bea Hefley, 89, American stadium organist (Dodger Stadium).
- Stefan Hula Sr., 77, Polish Olympic Nordic combined skier (1972, 1976).
- Robert E. Jones, 97, American jurist, judge of the U.S. District Court for Oregon (since 1990) and Oregon Supreme Court (1983–1990).
- Shelly Kappe, 96, American architectural historian.
- Erwin Lanc, 94, Austrian politician and sport administrator, president of the International Handball Federation (1984–2000) and minister of foreign affairs (1983–1984).
- Lee Kwok Cheung, 60, Hong Kong singer. (death announced on this date)
- Norman Charles Miller, 90, American journalist, COPD.
- László Miske, 89, Hungarian actor. (death announced on this date)
- Don Oakes, 86, American football player (Boston Patriots, Philadelphia Eagles).
- Gerd Poppe, 84, German politician, MP (1990–1998).
- Ángel del Pozo, 90, Spanish actor (Horror Express, The Big Gundown, Treasure Island).
- Fred Reid, 87, Scottish historian and disability rights activist.
- Tracy Schwarz, 86, American old-time singer (New Lost City Ramblers).
- John Thornton, 59, American venture capitalist, co-founder of the American Journalism Project and The Texas Tribune.

=== 30 ===
- Tarun Agarwala, 69, Indian jurist, chief justice of the Meghalaya High Court (2018–2021), heart attack.
- Jenny Alcorn, 66, Australian triathlete, glioblastoma.
- Hartmut Bärnighausen, 92, German chemist.
- Enrique Bátiz, 82, Mexican pianist and conductor.
- Ágota Bujdosó, 81, Hungarian handball player (Vasas, national team), Olympic bronze medallist (1976).
- Giacomo Caliendo, 82, Italian politician, senator (2008–2022), undersecretary at the Ministry of Justice (2008–2011).
- Eloína Echevarría, 63, Cuban long jumper and triple jumper.
- Barbara Frischmuth, 83, Austrian writer.
- Osvaldo Gil, 92, Filipino lawyer and sports executive.
- Tony Issa, 69, Lebanese-born Australian politician, MP (2011–2015).
- Matti Jutila, 92, Finnish-Canadian Olympic wrestler (1964).
- Stanley Kalms, Baron Kalms, 93, British businessman, chairman of Currys plc, and life peer, member of the House of Lords (2004–2024).
- Benny Kotsoane, 58, South African politician, member of the Free State Provincial Legislature (1994–2006).
- Andrew Krakouer, 42, Australian footballer (Richmond, Collingwood), heart attack.
- Franck Le Normand, 93, French Olympic cyclist (1952).
- Leandro Lima, 23, Brazilian footballer (São Bernardo FC, FK Pardubice).
- Mark McCormick, 91, American judge, justice of the Iowa Supreme Court (1972–1986).
- John Meisel, 101, Canadian political scientist.
- Lee Montague, 97, English actor (The Camp on Blood Island, Deadlier Than the Male, Jesus of Nazareth).
- Richard Norton, 75, Australian actor (Mad Max: Fury Road, Equalizer 2000, Mr. Nice Guy), bodyguard, and fight choreographer.
- Pachomius, 89, Egyptian Coptic Orthodox prelate, metropolitan bishop of Beheira (since 1971).
- Prem Parkash, 92, Indian writer.
- Jim Quinn, 82, American radio personality (The War Room with Quinn and Rose).
- Roselore Sonntag, 91, German Olympic artistic gymnast (1960) and gymnastics coach.
- Issei Tanaka, 92, Japanese scholar.
- Wayne Tieman, 74, American politician.
- Charlie Vandergaw, 86, American schoolteacher and animal trainer.

=== 31 ===
- Sian Barbara Allen, 78, American actress (Scream, Pretty Peggy, The Lindbergh Kidnapping Case, You'll Like My Mother), complications from Alzheimer's disease.
- Richard Bernstein, 80, American journalist (The New York Times, Time) and author, pancreatic cancer.
- Yves Boisset, 86, French film director (The Assassination, The Common Man, Le Juge Fayard dit Le Shériff) and screenwriter.
- Chang Je-won, 57, South Korean politician, member of the National Assembly (2008–2012, 2016–2024), suicide.
- Janric Craig, 3rd Viscount Craigavon, 80, British hereditary peer and member of the House of Lords (since 1974).
- Jacques Elong Elong, 40, Cameroonian footballer (Persepolis, Natf Maysan, national team), traffic collision.
- Silvina Fabars, 81, Cuban folk dancer.
- John J. Finnegan, 86, American politician, member of the Massachusetts House of Representatives (1967–1981).
- Andria Hall, 68–69, British ballerina (English National Ballet).
- Garry Hoyt, 93, American Olympic sailor (1968, 1972, 1976).
- J Nyi Nyi, 71, Burmese singer and musician.
- Ron Jones, 85, New Zealand gynaecologist.
- Mario Joseph, 62, Haitian human rights lawyer, traffic collision.
- Nancy Kilpatrick, 78, Canadian writer.
- Volkan Konak, 58, Turkish folk singer, heart attack.
- Mark Laforest, 62, Canadian ice hockey player (Philadelphia Flyers, Detroit Red Wings, Toronto Maple Leafs).
- Frank Laidlaw, 84, Scottish rugby union player (Melrose, national team, British & Irish Lions).
- John Lucas, 104, American educator.
- Patty Maloney, 89, American actress (Star Wars Holiday Special, Far Out Space Nuts, The Little Rascals), complications from multiple strokes.
- Tim Mohr, 55, German-American writer and editor, pancreatic cancer.
- Willy Naessens, 86, Belgian industrialist, complications from a fall.
- John Nelson, 83, American conductor.
- Maria Olandina Isabel Caeiro Alves, 69, East Timorese activist and diplomat, cancer.
- Bill O'Neill, 68, American politician, member of the New Mexico Senate (2013–2024), prostate cancer.
- Mikhail Rabinovich, 83, Russian physicist and neuroscientist.
- Lynn Venable, 97, American writer.
- Betty Webb, 101, English code breaker.
