= Motleb bin Abdullah Al-Nafisah =

Saudi Arabian politician (1937–2025)

His Excellency Motelb bin Abdullah Al-Nafisah

Minister of State and Member of the Council of Ministers
- In office 1995 – 27 March 2025
- Monarchs: King Fahd; King Abdullah; King Salman

Secretary General and member of the Supreme Council for Petroleum and Mineral Affairs
- In office 2001 – 27 March 2025
- Monarchs: King Fahd; King Abdullah; King Salman

Chairman of the Commission of Experts of the Cabinet
- In office 20 October 1975 – 3 August 1995
- Monarchs: King Khalid; King Fahd; King Abdullah

Personal details
- Born: 1937 Riyadh Al Khabra, Saudi Arabia
- Died: 27 March 2025 (aged 87–88)
- Children: Khalid, Fahad and Abdullah
- Education: University of Cairo; Harvard University

Motleb bin Abdullah bin Motleb bin Mohammed Al-Nafisah (Arabic: مطلب بن عبد الله النفيسة; 1937 – 27 March 2025) was a Saudi Arabian politician. He served as the minister of state and secretary general of the Supreme Council for Petroleum and Minerals of Saudi Arabia.

== Background ==
Al-Nafisah was born in Riyadh Al Khabra in Qassim in 1937. He held a bachelor's degree in law from the University of Cairo, Egypt in 1962. Nafisah received master's degree in law from Harvard University in 1971 and PhD in law from the same university in 1975. He died on 27 March 2025.

== Government positions ==
- Minister of State and a member of the Saudi Council of Ministers (1995–202t)
- Legal adviser in the Saudi Council of Ministers (1382–1962)
- Chairman of the Panel of Experts Assembly Minister (1975–1995)
- Secretary General and member of the Supreme Council for Petroleum and Mineral Affairs
- Supreme Economic Council
- Board of Civil Service
- Board of Military Service
- Deputy Director General of the Institute of Public Administration
- Participated in studies of all four systems:

Cabinet system
Judicial system
Trade regulations
Financial system

- Supreme Committee for the preparation of the Basic Law
- Supreme Committee for the preparation of the Shura Council
- Supreme Committee for the preparation of system areas
- Ministerial Committee supervising the project, King Abdullah to develop public education
- Ministerial Committee for Administrative Organization
