= Fred Reid (campaigner) =

Scottish historian, author and disability rights campaigner (1937–2025)

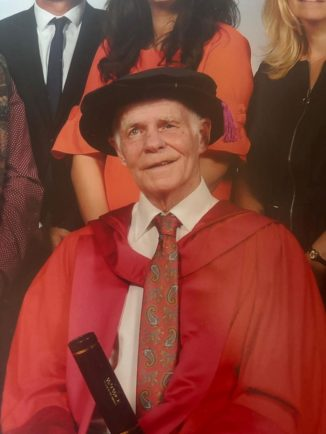
- Fred Reid in 2017
- Born: 1937; Glasgow, Scotland
- Died: 29 March 2025 (aged 87–88); Kenilworth, Warwickshire, England
- Occupations: Historian, author, disability rights campaigner
- Known for: Advocacy for blind and visually impaired people; historical works on Keir Hardie and Thomas Hardy
- Spouse: Etta Reid (m. 1963)
- Children: 3
- Honors: Honorary Doctor of Letters (DLitt), University of Warwick (2017, with Etta Reid)

Academic background
- Education: University of Edinburgh

Academic work
- Institutions: University of Warwick (Honorary Professor)
- Notable works: Keir Hardie: The Making of a Socialist (1978); Thomas Hardy and History (2017)

Fred Reid (1937 – 29 March 2025) was a Scottish-born historian, author, and disability rights campaigner. Blind from the age of 14, he became an influential advocate for blind and visually impaired people in the United Kingdom, while also producing respected works of historical scholarship. He lived for much of his later life in Kenilworth, Warwickshire, and was an honorary professor at the University of Warwick.

== Early life and education ==
Reid was born in Glasgow in 1937. He lost his sight completely at the age of 14 due to detached retinas. He attended Shawlands Academy in Glasgow and The Royal Blind School in Edinburgh before studying at the University of Edinburgh.

At the Royal Blind School in Edinburgh, he met his future wife, Etta, who was also blind from childhood. They married in Balornock, Glasgow, in 1963.

== Academic career ==
Reid pursued a career as a historian, specialising in literature and 19th century English social history. He became an honorary professor at the University of Warwick.

His most notable scholarly work was Keir Hardie: The Making of a Socialist (Croom Helm, 1978), a biography of the Labour Party founder, later republished by Routledge in 2018. The book was featured in a 2015 BBC Radio 4 documentary on Hardie, in which former Prime Minister Gordon Brown described Reid as "a great of our time".

Reid also published Thomas Hardy and History (Palgrave Macmillan, 2017), exploring the novelist’s engagement with historical themes.

== Campaigning and advocacy ==
Alongside his academic work, Reid was a prominent campaigner for the rights of blind and visually impaired people. He served as president of the National Federation of the Blind and Partially Sighted (1972–1975). He was a trustee of the Royal National Institute of Blind People (RNIB) in two periods: 1974–1987 and 1999–2006.

He contributed to the development of Disability Living Allowance, the founding of Sense College, Loughborough, and he campaigned for improved access to employment and inclusive education. With his wife Etta, Reid co-founded and ran the Kenilworth Reader and Visitor Service, which organises volunteers to read books, letters, and documents to visually impaired people in Warwickshire. He was also a regular contributor to BBC Radio 4’s In Touch programme.

== Honours and recognition ==
In 2017, Fred and Etta Reid were jointly awarded Honorary Doctorates of Letters (DLitt) by the University of Warwick, recognising their voluntary service to visually impaired people.

Tributes following his death highlighted his influence. Gordon Brown recalled Reid’s support when Brown lost in one eye as a student, describing Reid as "an inspiration". BBC broadcaster Peter White called him "one of the most effective campaigners on behalf of blind and partially sighted people".

== Personal life ==
Fred Reid married Etta in 1963. Etta worked as an NHS physiotherapist at the former Warneford Hospital in Leamington Spa. Together they raised three children, including Julie Reid who wrote a feature in the Guardian describing their childhood. Reid died at home in Kenilworth, Warwickshire, on 29 March 2025, after a short illness. He was 87.

== Selected works ==
- Keir Hardie: The Making of a Socialist (Croom Helm, 1978; Routledge reprint, 2018)
- Thomas Hardy and History (Palgrave Macmillan, 2017)
