= Ray Landorf =

Australian rules footballer

Personal information
- Full name: Ray Landorf
- Born: 24 January 1938
- Died: 17 March 2025 (aged 87)
- Original team: Port Melbourne
- Height: 178 cm (5 ft 10 in)
- Weight: 89 kg (196 lb)

Playing career^{1}
Years	Club	Games (Goals)
1959–60	South Melbourne	19 (0)
- ^{1} Playing statistics correct to the end of 1960.

Ray Landorf (24 January 1938 – 17 March 2025) was an Australian rules footballer who played with South Melbourne in the Victorian Football League (VFL).
