= Sense College, Loughborough =

College in Leicestershire, England

Coordinates: 52.7695°N 1.2184°W

Sense College Loughborough (formerly RNIB College Loughborough) in Loughborough, England is a college for people with a wide range of disabilities, owned and operated by the national charity, Sense.

== History ==
In 1989 the college moved to new purpose-built accommodation on the campus of Loughborough College, with the aim of enabling access to the full range of provision of a mainstream further education college. The college supports people with sight loss and other disabilities to access education, employment and independent living.

In 2020, the college transferred from the RNIB to Sense. At this time, the college's residential centre was also closed.

== Programmes ==
The college supports people aged 16–25 on further education programmes which are individually tailored to learners' goals for the future. Programmes vary from Foundation Learning to A Levels and National Diplomas. Many learners progress onto further education at their local college, higher education, employment or voluntary work. Progression programmes designed for learners moving into independent or supported living are also available.

In addition to young people, RNIB College Loughborough also supports adults aged 18+ with sight loss and/or other disabilities committed to securing employment through skills training, job search support, job coaching and mentoring and planned work placements. Programmes are funded through the Department for Work and Pensions and are flexible in length, typically 6 to 9 months. The programmes are designed for people who are unemployed and need to develop their skills in order to get back to work.

== Partnerships ==
RNIB College Loughborough was one of the first specialist colleges to have a formal partnership arrangement with a mainstream partner - Loughborough College. The Colleges share the same campus and collaborate closely. Around a third of further education and some adult learners attend programmes at Loughborough College.

The partnership between the two colleges is a close one and is governed by a Memorandum of Agreement. This means that RCL learners have supported access to a very wide range of courses. It can also help them develop the skills to learn in a mainstream environment. At the full Ofsted inspection in February 2008 they found the relationship to be, 'very effective' with full collaboration on quality assurance, lesson observations and staff development.

The college has established a strong Partnership for Employment network with a wide range of employers who offer work placements and other support to learners including mock interviews.

The college works in close collaboration with the five other specialist colleges in the region in a Peer Review and Development Group. Recently the group has worked on e-safety, peer review, Individual Learning Plans and the embedding of targets, and the quality of teaching and learning.

== See also ==
- RNIB
- Visual impairment
