= H. Rutherford Turnbull =

American academic (1937–2025)

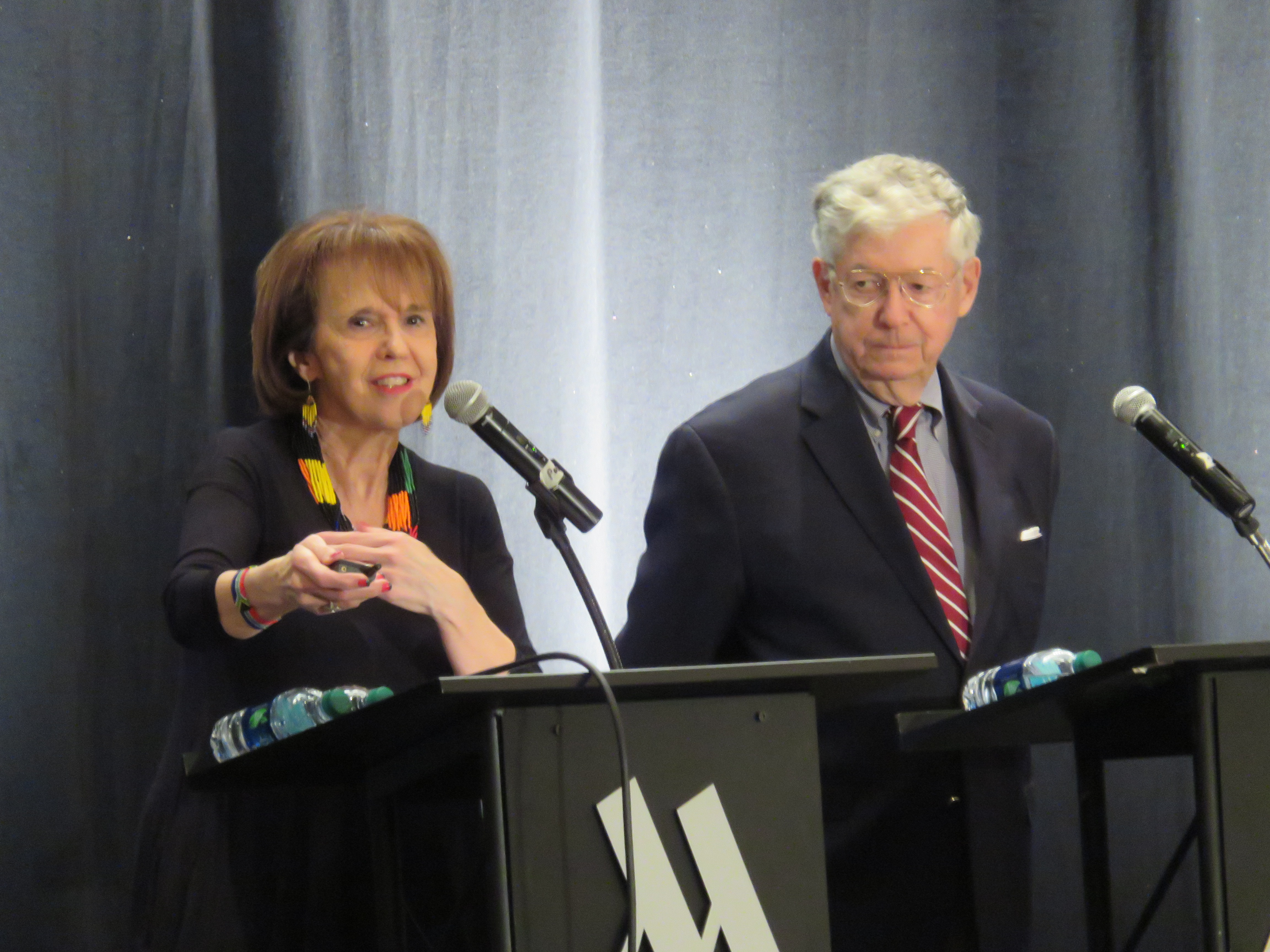
- Turnbull (right) and his wife Ann in 2017
- Born: September 22, 1937; New York, United States
- Died: March 18, 2025 (aged 87); New York, United States
- Spouse: Ann Turnbull

H. Rutherford Turnbull III (September 22, 1937 – March 18, 2025) was an American author, educator and leader in the field of disability policy and law. He was Ross and Marianna Beach Distinguished Professor Emeritus of special education and law at University of Kansas.

== Education ==
Turnbull graduated from Kent School in 1955. In 1959, he graduated with a Bachelor of Arts degree in political science from Johns Hopkins University. In 1964, he earned his LL.B./J.D. from University of Maryland Law School and in 1969 his LL.M. from Harvard University Law School.

== Death ==
Turnbull died on March 18, 2025, at the age of 87.
