= Sonny Arguinzoni =

American writer (1939–2025)

Sonny Arguinzoni (November 12, 1939 – March 3, 2025) was an American Evangelical Christian pastor, author and youth counselor who founded Victory Outreach International, an international ministry of Evangelical Christian Churches. Since its founding, Victory Outreach has grown throughout the United States and in over 33 countries. Arguinzoni died on March 3, 2025, at the age of 85.
