= Li Deping =

Chinese physicist

- 李德平
- Born: 4 November 1926; Tsinghua Garden, Beijing, China
- Died: 16 March 2025 (aged 98); Beijing, China
- Education: National Southwestern Associated University; Tsinghua University
- Scientific career
- Fields: Radiation physics
- Workplaces: China Institute for Radiation Protection

Li Deping (Chinese: 李德平; pinyin: Lǐ Dépíng; 4 November 1926 – 16 March 2025) was a Chinese radiation physicist, and an academician of the Chinese Academy of Sciences. He was a member of the 6th, 7th, 8th and 9th National Committee of the Chinese People's Political Consultative Conference.

== Biography ==
Li was born into a prestigious family at Tsinghua Garden, in Beijing, on 4 November 1926, to Li Jitong (李继侗), an educator and an academician of the Chinese Academy of Sciences, and Xu Shuying (徐淑英), who came from a scholarly family. His ancestral home is in Xinghua County, Jiangsu. His ancestor Li Chunfang was a senior official of the Ming dynasty (1368–1644), and his grandfather Li Yuanzai (李元宰) was a former Qing scholar who studied in Japan and served in the Beiyang government.

In 1937, the Lugou Bridge Incident broke out. In order to avoid the war, their family was forced to relocate to Suzhou, Yangzhou and other places, and relocated to his ancestral home Xinghua County at the end of the year, where he attended Xinghua County Middle School. In 1944, he was accepted to the National Southwestern Associated University in Kunming, capital of southwest China's Yunnan province. After Japan's surrender in 1945, National Southwest Associated University disbanded. Li returned to Beiping and chose to continue his third and fourth year courses at Tsinghua University.

After graduation in 1948, Li stayed for teaching. In the autumn of 1950, Qian Sanqiang went to Tsinghua University to find talents for the newly established Institute of Modern Physics of the Chinese Academy of Sciences. Zhou Peiyuan, the then president of Tsinghua University, recommended Li to him. Considering that the cloud chamber technology and counter tube technology there are at the forefront of the world, Li went to work in the Institute of Modern Physics (later renamed the Institute of Atomic Energy). In 1958, the Institute of Atomic Energy began scientific research on nuclear safety protection, and Li became director of the Radiation Physics Laboratory.

In 1962, Li came to Taiyuan with his family and participated in the establishment of the North China Industrial Hygiene Research Institute (now China Institute of Radiation Protection). On March 7, a total of 132 technical experts from the Technical Safety Department led by him, as well as researchers from the Radiobiology and Radiochemistry Research Departments, established the "Beijing Industrial Hygiene Research Institute" which internally known as the 7th Institute of the Second Ministry of Machinery, with Li was director of the Radiation Physics Research Department.

From 1985 to 1997, Li was re-elected as a member of the International Committee on Radiological Protection (ICRP) for three consecutive terms. In 1986, he served as the main person in charge of the project "Modernization of Radiation Protection in China" in cooperation with the International Atomic Energy Agency (IAEA). From 1987 to 1992, he was the Chinese representative of the United Nations Scientific Committee (UNSCEAR) on the Effects of Atomic Radiation, and from 1988 to 1992, he was a member of the International Nuclear Safety Advisory Group of the International Atomic Energy Agency.

Li died on 16 March 2025 in Beijing, at the age of 99.

== Honours and awards ==
- 1991 Member of the Chinese Academy of Sciences (CAS)
