= Henri Le More =

French sociologist and editor (1941–2025)

- Born: 1 October 1941; Limoges, France
- Died: 23 March 2025 (aged 83); La Ferté Macé, France
- Education: HEC Paris
- Occupation(s): Sociologist; Editor

Henri Le More (1 October 1941 – 23 March 2025) was a French sociologist and editor.

Le More was notably a co-founder of Phénix Editions and the online bookstore Librissimo. He also served as administrator of the Association des amis de la Bibliothèque nationale de France.

Le More died in La Ferté Macé on 23 March 2025, at the age of 83.

== Works ==
- "L'invention du cadre commercial" (1968)
- Classes possédantes et classes dirigeantes, essai sur les grandes écoles (1977)
- Guide de Paris en jeans
