= Lee Kwok Cheung =

Hong Kong singer

K.C. Lee Kwok Cheung
- 李國祥
- Died: Mainland China
- Education: Oberlin College
- Occupation: Singer

K.C. Lee Kwok Cheung (Chinese: 李國祥) was a Hong Kong male singer.

== Background ==
Lee graduated from Hong Kong Rennie's Mill Middle School (primary and junior high school), and was the 27th grade 6 graduate of the school in 1978. Afterwards, he enrolled in Oberlin College.

Lee released his last album "Leaving Love" (離愛出走) in 1996 and his contract with Golden Pony Record Ltd. expired. After 2000, his singing career focused on covering songs and producing HIFI records. According to Lee's recollection, he tried to start a business during the low point of his career in the mid-to-late 1990s, but gave up after three failures. Later, he went bankrupt due to failure in real estate speculation.

In 2015, Lee held his first concert in the industry, "Lee Kwok Cheung's Unending Love Concert" at the MacPherson Stadium. In 2016, he served as the judge for "Smiling Enterprises" and "Smiling Employees", and presented awards to many companies and employees in Hong Kong and Macau who performed outstandingly in smiling service. In 2016, Lee publicly came out in an interview with Next Magazine Issue 1394, he revealed his homosexuality and broke up with his boyfriend of 11 years. In 2017, Lee performed "The Unending Love" on the TVB program "50 Golden Classics".

In March 2024, Lee was diagnosed with lung cancer. He died at his home in mainland China on the afternoon of March 13, 2025, at the age of 60. His ashes were cremated and transported back to Hong Kong on March 28 of the same year. The news of his death was first announced by Lee's friend, composer and arranger Dominic Chow Kai-sang on his Facebook page on March 29 of the same year, and was later confirmed by Lee's manager through TVB Entertainment News Channel.

== Discography ==
- "Blue" (June 1991)
- "Night of Picking Stars" (摘星的晚上, March 1992)
- "Unending Love" (餘情未了, 25 December 1992)
- "The Lingering Feelings Can't Stop" (餘情停不了, May 1993)
- "A Little More Gentle" (多一點溫柔, 30 September 1993)
