= Riyadh Al Khabra =

Governorate of Saudi Arabia

- Governorate
- Country: Saudi Arabia
- Region: Al-Qassim Region

Area
  - Governorate: 1,707 km^{2} (659 sq mi)

Population (2022 census)
  - Governorate: 31,203
  - Density: 18.28/km^{2} (47.34/sq mi)
  - Urban: 25,588
- Time zone: UTC+3 (EAT)
  - Summer (DST): UTC+3 (EAT)

Riyadh Al Khabra (Arabic: رياض الخبراء) is one of the governorates in Al-Qassim Region, Saudi Arabia.

Its historical city is best known for trading and goods exchange.

The El-Abry Museum for Heritage and Classic Cars is a museum at Riyadh Al Khabra, founded by Abdulrahman bin Nasser Alebry. The museum's exhibition includes old heritage items such as weapons, documents, tools, crafts and taxidermy exhibits. It also has the old kitchen and bedroom which contain all their original furnishings. In the great courtyard, there is a sawani (camel-operated well), a jusah (storage compartment for dates), classic cars, and old fuel dispensers.
