= David Kristol =

American academician (1938–2025)

David Sol Kristol (June 4, 1938 – March 24, 2025) was an American academician who was an emeritus professor at New Jersey Institute of Technology (NJIT). He created the Biomedical Engineering department at NJIT, but he spent most of his career working as a chemistry and biochemistry professor.

== Background ==
Born in Brooklyn, New York, Kristol received his Bachelor of Science from Brooklyn College in 1958. While in college, he worked on one of the first kidney (dialysis) machines at Brooklyn Jewish Hospital where he saved lives. He then received his Masters and PhD from New York University in organic chemistry, graduating in 1969.

Kristol died on March 24, 2025, at the age of 86.

== Career ==
Kristol was a full professor at NJIT, and he taught chemistry to undergraduate and graduate students. Kristol invented over 30 compounds, he held patents, and he published many peer reviewed articles. Kristol created one of the first Biomedical Engineering programs in the United States. He became the acting chairman of the department and then he taught there. Kristol was the pre-med advisor for NJIT.

== Sources ==
- David Kristol profile
