= Alfredo Montoya Melgar =

Spanish jurist (1937–2025)

Alfredo Montoya Melgar (25 September 1937 – 28 March 2025) was a Spanish jurist and university professor who was justice of the Constitutional Court of Spain between 2017 and 2022. He was a professor of Labor and Social Security Law at the Complutense University of Madrid. Montoya Melgar died on 28 March 2025, at the age of 87.
