= Jesús Santos =

Spanish politician (1981–2025)

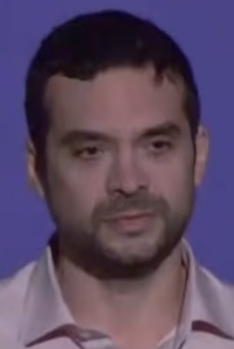
- Santos in 2018

First Deputy Mayor of Alcorcón
- In office June 2019 – September 2024
- Preceded by: Luis Galindo

Councillor of Alcorcón
- In office 13 June 2015 – 23 March 2025

Member of Madrid Assembly
- In office 8 June 2021 – 13 June 2023

Personal details
- Born: 20 October 1981 Madrid, Spain
- Died: 23 March 2025 (aged 43) Alcorcón, Spain
- Party: Ganar Alcorcón
- Other political affiliations: Podemos (2016–2023); Sumar (2024–2025)
- Occupation: Waste collector, trade unionist, politician

Jesús Santos Gimeno (20 October 1981 – 23 March 2025) was a Spanish politician associated with Ganar Alcorcón. He served as First Deputy Mayor of Alcorcón and President of ESMASA, the municipal waste management company, from June 2019 until September 2024, when he stepped down due to a cancer diagnosis. Prior to his political career, he worked for 16 years as a waste collector and truck driver at ESMASA.

== Biography ==
=== Early life and trade unionism ===
Jesús Santos was born on 20 October 1981 in Madrid, Spain. He spent his early years in Fuenlabrada until age 10, then moved to Alcorcón, where he grew up. During his teenage years, he became involved in Anti-racist and Anti-fascist social movements. At 16, he began working as a waiter and later in construction. In 2003, at age 22, he joined ESMASA as a street sweeper, securing a permanent position through a public examination in 2005. That year, he established a branch of the Confederación General del Trabajo (CGT) union at ESMASA and later became president of the company’s works council.

In 2014, Santos led a 16-day strike against the local government’s plan, led by the People's Party, to privatize certain ESMASA services. The strike resulted in improved conditions for some workers, though other services faced setbacks.

=== Political career ===
Santos entered politics in 2015 as the lead candidate for Ganar Alcorcón, a coalition initially formed by Podemos, Izquierda Unida (United Left), the Communist Party of Spain (PCE), and local social movements. However, only IU and PCE ultimately backed the candidacy. The party won five seats in the Alcorcón municipal elections, placing third. During this period, Santos criticized the municipal waste management, describing Alcorcón as a "city-dump."

In 2016, he joined Podemos and became part of its regional executive in the Community of Madrid. That year, a party commission he supported removed locally elected Podemos officials in Alcorcón, a move criticized as part of broader internal restructuring within the party.

=== 2019–2023: Deputy Mayor and Regional Politics ===
In the May 2019 municipal elections, Santos headed the Unidas Podemos Ganar Alcorcón coalition, securing 17.71% of the vote and five council seats. Following the election, the coalition formed a government with the Spanish Socialist Workers’ Party (PSOE). Santos was appointed First Deputy Mayor, Councillor for City Services, and President of ESMASA. Under his leadership, ESMASA, previously at risk of dissolution, began reporting profits by 2020. In October 2019, he also became Vice President of the Mancomunidad del Sur, a waste management consortium covering over 70 municipalities, through an agreement with Getafe’s mayor, Sara Hernández.

In June 2020, Santos was elected Coordinator General of Podemos in the Community of Madrid, receiving all votes cast. He entered the regional Assembly of Madrid as a deputy in June 2021 following the 2021 regional elections, focusing on waste management, energy policy, and issues affecting Alcorcón.

=== 2023–2024: Re-election and Departure from Podemos ===
In December 2022, Santos announced his candidacy for Mayor of Alcorcón in the 2023 elections under the Ganar Alcorcón banner, distancing himself from Podemos. His campaign emphasized housing, sustainable industry, and local energy initiatives. Ganar Alcorcón won 15.69% of the vote and four seats in the May 2023 elections, enabling a tripartite coalition government. Santos retained his roles as First Deputy Mayor and ESMASA President, while taking on additional responsibilities in economic development and investments.

In December 2023, Santos left Podemos, citing significant differences with its leadership. He aligned himself with Sumar, a political platform led by Yolanda Díaz, who had supported his 2023 campaign. He continued leading Ganar Alcorcón, emphasizing its municipalist focus.

=== Personal life and death ===
Santos lived most of his life in Alcorcón. Little is publicly known about his family or private life.

In September 2024, Santos retired from politics after being diagnosed with cancer. He died in Alcorcón on 23 March 2025, at the age of 43. His death prompted tributes from political and social figures, recognizing his contributions to local governance and public services.

=== Legacy ===
Santos was noted for his transition from a waste collector to a prominent municipal leader, as well as his advocacy for public services. His "Neighborhood-by-Neighborhood Cleaning Plan," launched in 2020, exemplified his participatory approach to local governance.
