= Aubrey Walshe =

Zimbabwean cricketer and political scientist

Personal information
- Full name: Aubrey Peter Walshe
- Born: 1 January 1934; Salisbury, Mashonaland, Southern Rhodesia
- Died: 9 March 2025 (aged 91); South Bend, Indiana, United States
- Batting: Right-handed
- Role: Wicket-keeper

Domestic team information
- Years: Team
- 1953–1956: Oxford University

Career statistics
Competition	First-class
Matches	46
Runs scored	900
Batting average	14.75
100s/50s	0/2
Top score	77
Catches/stumpings	48/12
- Source: Cricinfo, 6 July 2020

Aubrey Peter Walshe (1 January 1934 – 9 March 2025) was a Zimbabwean political scientist and first-class cricketer.

Walshe was born at Salisbury in Southern Rhodesia in January 1934. He received his primary schooling in South Africa at Johannesburg and his secondary education back in Rhodesia at Bulawayo. He later studied in England at Wadham College at the University of Oxford. While studying at Oxford, he played first-class cricket for Oxford University, making his debut against Gloucestershire at Oxford in 1953. He played first-class cricket for Oxford until 1956, making 46 appearances. Playing as a wicket-keeper, Walshe scored 900 runs at an average of 14.75, with a high score of 77. Behind the stumps he took 48 catches and made 12 stumpings.

After gaining his doctorate from St Anthony's College, Oxford, where he was an Oppenheimer fellow, Walshe returned to Africa where he lectured at Pius XII Catholic University College in Basutoland from 1959 to 1962. From there he emigrated to the United States, where he became professor of political science at the University of Notre Dame in 1967. Walshe held fellowships with a number of institutes, including the Helen Kellogg Institute for International Studies and the Joan Kroc Institute for International Peace Studies. He wrote a number of books on African politics including black nationalism and liberation movements.

Walshe and his wife Ann were married for 68 years until his death at his home in South Bend, Indiana, in March 2025. They had four children.
