= Akpovi Akoègninou =

Beninese botanist and academic (1950–2025)

- Born: 1950; Savalou, French Dahomey, French West Africa
- Died: 7 March 2025 (aged 74–75)
- Occupations: Botanist, academic

Akpovi Akoègninou (1950 – 7 March 2025) was a Beninese botanist and academic.

In 2004, with Stanisław Lisowski, Akoègninou identified a new species, Thunbergia atacorensis, a plant of the Acanthaceae family, native to Benin's Natitingou region. That same year, he identified another plant species, Ipomoea beninensis of the Convolvulaceae family alongside Loskowski and Brice Sinsin.

He headed the botany department at the University of Abomey-Calavi.

Akoègninou died on 7 March 2025.

== Publications ==
- "Structure, ecological spectra and species dominance in riparian forests from Benin (West Africa)" (2012)
- "Identification des microbes et teneur en eau des échantillons de miel produits et commercialisés au Benin" (2012)

== Honors ==
- Knight of the National Order of Benin (2012)
