= Bożena Hilczer =

Polish physicist (1936–2025)

- Born: 1936; Bydgoszcz, Poland
- Died: March 26, 2025
- Education: Adam Mickiewicz University in Poznań
- Known for: Research on ferroelectrics, electrets and dielectric materials
- Scientific career
- Fields: Condensed matter physics
- Workplaces: Institute of Molecular Physics, Polish Academy of Sciences

Bożena Hilczer (1936 – 26 March 2025) was a Polish physicist at the Institute of Molecular Physics, Polish Academy of Sciences (IFM PAN) in Poznań. She worked in ferroelectrics, charge storage in dielectrics, dielectric dynamics in ferroic structures, superprotonic phase transitions and proton transport, and functional ceramic–polymer composites.

== Early life and education ==
Hilczer was born in 1936 in Bydgoszcz, Poland. She completed an MSc degree in physics at Adam Mickiewicz University in Poznań in 1958.

== Career ==
In 1958, Hilczer began research work as an assistant in the Poznań branch of the Institute of Physics of the Polish Academy of Sciences (PAS). She received a PhD in 1965 and became head of the Ferroelectrics Department. She obtained habilitation in solid-state physics in 1974 at the Institute of Physics PAS in Warsaw.

In 1975 she joined the newly autonomous Institute of Molecular Physics PAS in Poznań as an assistant professor and was awarded the title of full professor in 1981. She formally retired in 2011 and continued as professor emerita from 2012. She died on 26 March 2025, aged 88.

== Research and teaching ==
Between 1985 and 2000, Hilczer delivered courses on topics including lattice defects in ferroelectrics, physics of dielectrics, smart materials, and sensors and actuators. She investigated how defects, irradiation and doping affect ferroelectric properties and phase transitions, including radiation-induced transitions and behaviour near Curie temperatures. Her work also addressed charge storage phenomena in dielectrics, including electrets, piezopolymers and ferroelectric polymers, as well as dielectric response and dynamics in ferroelectric and ferroelastic structures. She co-authored specialist monographs on electrets and related materials in Polish. She held a patent related to electret microphone diaphragms and co-authored a technology for pyroelectric detectors based on piezopolymers.

J. F. Scott discussed irradiation experiments by Hilczer as demonstrating that defect populations can generate strong anomalies in measurements near ferroelectric phase transitions, and that such effects can be removed by annealing and reproduced by renewed irradiation.

== Professional activities ==
Hilczer was involved in the Polish–Czech Seminar on Structural and Ferroelectric Phase Transitions, originated in discussions between her and Jan Fousek, and these bilateral meetings have been held alternately in the two countries since 1979.

She was chair of the Polish Society for Crystal Growth (PTWK) awards chapter (kapituła nagród), among those involved in the society’s awards activity for the 2001–2004 term.
