= Wayne Tieman =

American politician

Member of the North Dakota House of Representatives from the 10th district
- In office December 1, 2000 – January 1, 2004
- Preceded by: Robert Nowatzki
- Succeeded by: Jo Ann Rodenbiker

Personal details
- Born: May 13, 1950 Thief River Falls, Minnesota
- Died: March 30, 2025 (aged 74) Bemidji, Minnesota
- Party: Republican

Wayne Tieman (May 13, 1950 – March 30, 2025) was an American politician who served in the North Dakota House of Representatives from the 10th district from 2000 to 2004.

He died on March 30, 2025, in Bemidji, Minnesota at age 74.
