= Éric Eydoux =

French writer and academic (1940–2025)

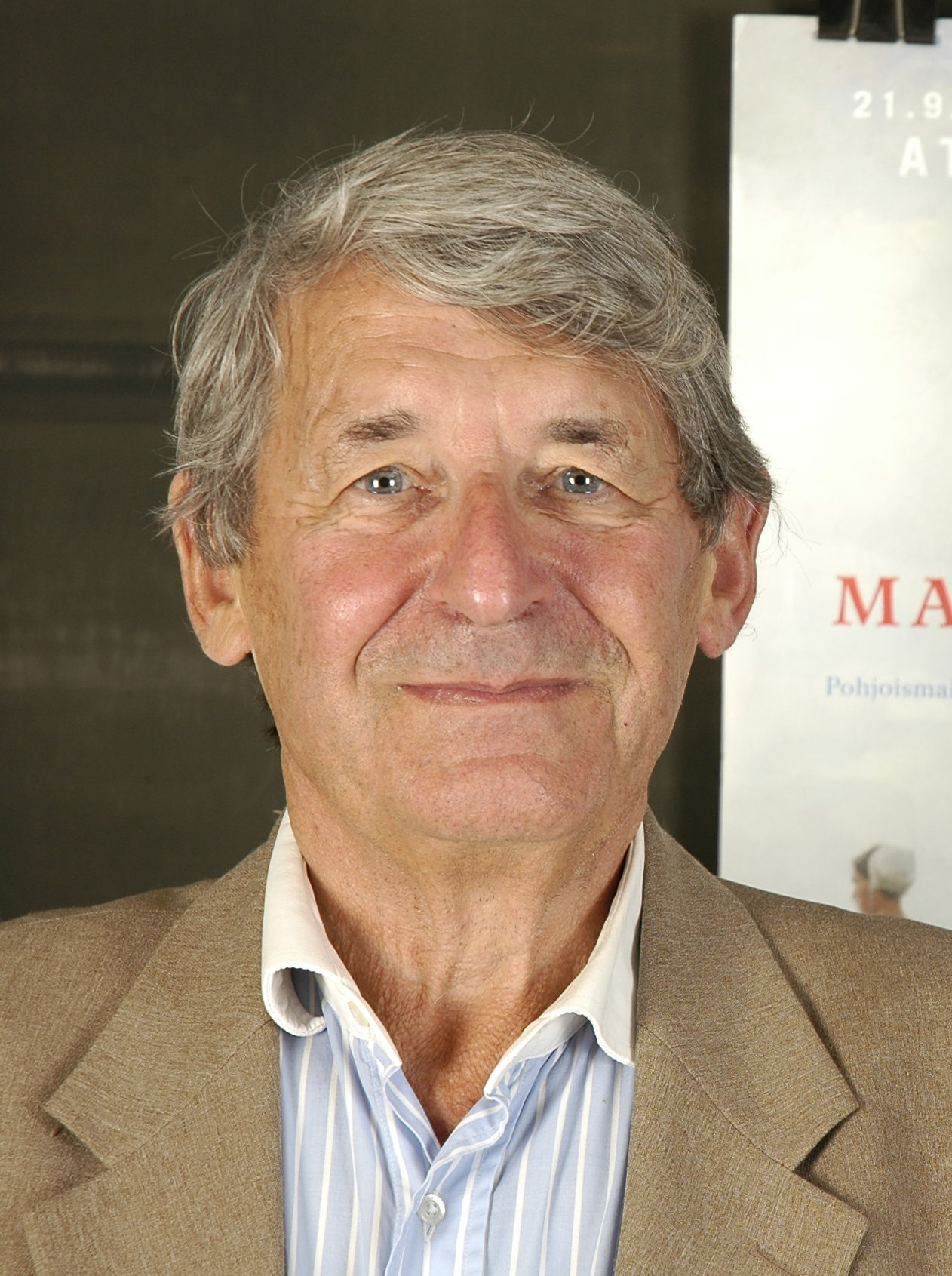
- Eydoux in 2011
- Born: 27 January 1940; Paris, France
- Died: 24 March 2025 (aged 85); Caen, France
- Education: University of Paris Faculty of Humanities
- Occupations: Writer; Academic

Éric Eydoux (27 January 1940 – 24 March 2025) was a French writer and academic. He specialized in Nordic languages and civilizations, teaching at the University of Caen Normandy and was also an essayist, novelist, and translator.

== Life and career ==
Born in Paris on 27 January 1940, Eydoux was the son of government official Henri-Paul Eydoux and journalist Elisabeth Nissen. Of Franco-Norwegian origin, he attended secondary school at the Lycée Henri-IV and earned a doctorate in Scandinavian studies from the University of Paris Faculty of Humanities. He worked in Kristiansand and Strasbourg before starting his career at the University of Caen Normandie in the department of Nordic studies.

From 1976 to 1980, Eydoux worked as a cultural ambassador at the Embassy of France, Oslo. In 1983, he co-founded the Office franco-norvégien de l’université de Caen with Rolf Tobiassen, which he directed until 2004. In 1992, he co-founded the Les Boréales de Normandie festival, which he directed until 1998, leaving it to the Centre régional des lettres. He also directed the Nordic collection at the Presses universitaires de Caen.

From 2001 to 2008, Eydoux was the deputy mayor for culture of Caen, where he created L’Aventure humaine. In 2007, he published Histoire de la littérature norvégienne, which became the first official French document on Norwegian literature since 1952. In 2008, he joined the board of directors of the Musée des Beaux-Arts de Caen. From 2014 to 2015, he was vice-president of the Académie des sciences, arts et belles lettres de Caen and became an honorary member thereafter.

Eydoux died in Caen on 24 March 2025, at the age of 85.

== Publications ==
- La Scandinavie (1972)
- Le groupe et la revue Mot Dag (1973)
- Les grandes heures du Danemark (1975)
- Écrivains de Norvège (1991)
- Dictionnaire des auteurs européens (1992)
- Dragons et drakkars (1996)
- Patrimoine littéraire européen (1991–2001)
- Le nouveau dictionnaire des auteurs (1994)
- Le nouveau dictionnaire des œuvres (1994)
- Dictionnaire universel des littératures (1994)
- Polars du Nord (1997)
- Passions boréales (2000)
- Peintres du Nord en voyage dans l'Ouest (2001)
- Histoire de la littérature norvégienne (2007)
- L'Office franco-norvégien, trente ans de collaboration franco-norvégienne (2013)
- Sus au châtelain ! (2018)
- Le Chemin de la trahison. La Norvège à l'heure de Quisling (2018)
