= Raymundus Sau Fernandes =

Indonesian politician (1972–2025)

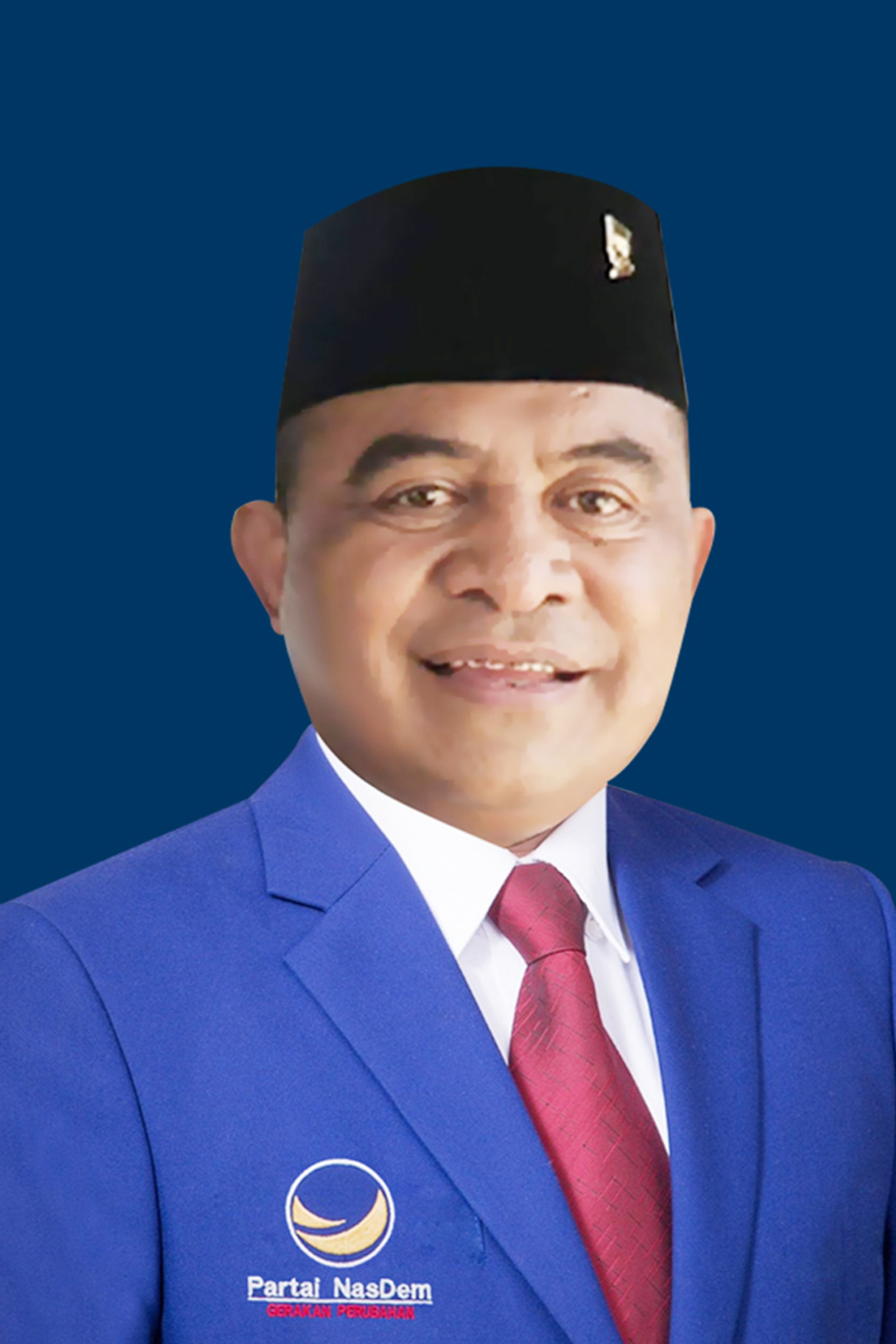

9th Regent of North Central Timor
- In office 17 February 2016 – 17 February 2021
- President: Joko Widodo
- Governor: Frans Lebu Raya; Robert Simbolon (Acting); Viktor Laiskodat
- Preceded by: Benediktus Polo Maing (Acting)
- Succeeded by: Fransiskus Fay (Interim), Juandi David

2nd Deputy Regent of North Central Timor
- In office 2005–2010
- President: Susilo Bambang Yudhoyono
- Governor: Piet Tallo
- Preceded by: Gabriel Manek
- Succeeded by: Aloysius Kobes

Personal details
- Born: 31 August 1972 Bijeli, East Noemuti, North Central Timor, East Nusa Tenggara, Indonesia
- Died: 27 March 2025 (aged 52) Biboki Anleu, North Central Timor, East Nusa Tenggara, Indonesia
- Party: NasDem Party
- Spouse: Kristiana Muki
- Children: 6
- Parent(s): Yakobus Manue Fernandez (father); Margaretha Hati Manhitu (mother)
- Education: Nusa Cendana University (S.Pt.)
- Occupation: Politician

Raymundus Sau Fernandes (31 August 1972 – 27 March 2025) was an Indonesian politician who served as the 9th Regent of North Central Timor for two terms, from 2010 to 2015 and from 2016 to 2021. He also held the position of Deputy Regent from 2005 to 2010.

== Life and career ==
=== Early life and education ===
Raymundus Sau Fernandes was born on 31 August 1972 in Bijeli, East Noemuti, North Central Timor, East Nusa Tenggara, Indonesia. He was the son of Yakobus Manue Fernandez and Margaretha Hati Manhitu. Fernandes graduated from Nusa Cendana University with a degree in Animal husbandry( S.Pt.).

=== Political career ===
Fernandes began his political career as the 2nd Deputy Regent of North Central Timor, serving from 2005 to 2010 under Governor Piet Tallo during Susilo Bambang Yudhoyono's presidency. He succeeded Gabriel Manek and was succeeded by Aloysius Kobes.

In 2010, Fernandes was elected Regent of North Central Timor, serving until 21 December 2015. His first term spanned the presidencies of Susilo Bambang Yudhoyono and Joko Widodo, with Frans Lebu Raya as governor. He succeeded Gabriel Manek and was followed by Benediktus Polo Maing as acting regent.

Fernandes was re-elected and sworn in for a second term on 17 February 2016, serving until 17 February 2021 under President Joko Widodo. During this period, he worked with governors Frans Lebu Raya, Robert Simbolon (acting), and Viktor Laiskodat, with Aloysius Kobes as his deputy. He succeeded Benediktus Polo Maing (acting) and was succeeded by Fransiskus Fay (interim) and later Juandi David.

Affiliated with the NasDem Party, Fernandes focused his political career on local governance in North Central Timor.

=== Personal life and death ===
Fernandes was married to Kristiana Muki, with whom he had six children. He maintained ties to his home region throughout his life.

On 27 March 2025, Fernandes drowned in Biboki Anleu, North Central Timor. He was 52.
