= Lloyd Ray Milliken =

American seafood entrepreneur and restaurateur

Lloyd Ray Milliken (June 14, 1931 – March 11, 2025) was an American seafood entrepreneur, restaurateur, and businessman known for his work in the seafood industry and hospitality ventures across the Southeastern United States. He established seafood restaurants, seafood processing operations, and early gambling boat enterprises in Florida and South Carolina.

== Early life ==
Milliken was born in Brunswick County, North Carolina, to Asburn LeDrew Milliken and Emma Jane Smith Milliken. He began working on the Shallotte River at the age of 12, harvesting oysters, which trade would come to define much of his life. His father Ashburn was the first licensed oysterman in Brunswick County and considered an oyster shucking pioneer.

== Career ==
In 1962, Milliken opened an oyster house on Shallotte Point Loop, which later evolved into Lloyd's Oyster House on Village Point Road. He acquired his first shrimp boat in 1964 and eventually expanded his fleet to eight vessels. Over the course of his career, he owned and operated more than 20 restaurants from the Carolinas to Florida, including his first major venture, Larry's Calabash Seafood Barn, in 1977.

Milliken supplied oysters to the long-running North Carolina Oyster Festival, including sourcing oysters from out of state when regional supplies were disrupted by hurricanes. He was also two-time winner of the North Carolina oyster shucking championship, winning in both 1983 and 1984.

He was a key figure in the development of seafood infrastructure in Port Canaveral, Florida. In the 1990s, Milliken leased property in the Cove area of Port Canaveral, where he founded several establishments including the Sunset Waterfront Bar and Cafe in Cocoa Beach and Milliken's Reef Restaurant, which opened in 2008.

Milliken also played a leading role in the creation of the town of Carolina Shores, North Carolina, being one of the business owners who pressed for the town to be split from Calabash, North Carolina, in the early 1990s, over disputes with the government of that town over its operations.

In the 2000s and 2010s, he was involved in a proposed hotel project adjacent to the restaurant, though it ultimately did not materialize. Controversy arose around the project when it was alleged that a member of the Canaveral Port Authority board of commissioners had been paid by persons associated with Milliken to support the hotel effort, but nothing came of the accusation.

In addition to his restaurant and seafood ventures, Milliken built and operated the only water slide on Ocean Isle Beach, North Carolina, in 1978 and ran multiple nightclubs in Myrtle Beach, including the well-known Xanadu. He also owned Lloyd's Oyster Company, a seafood transportation and logistics business serving the East Coast.

A gambling boat pioneer, Milliken introduced one of the first such vessels to Port Canaveral and later brought the first gambling boat to South Carolina at Little River, continuing his involvement as a partner in the Big M Casino Boat.

== Personal life and legacy ==
Milliken died on March 11, 2025.
