= Issei Tanaka =

Japanese writer (1932/1933–2025)

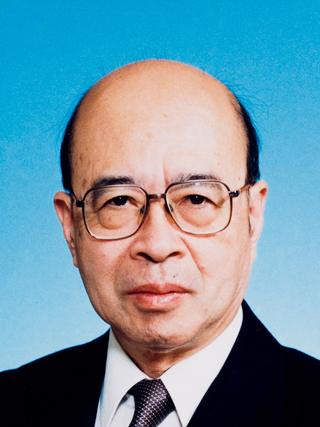
Tanaka in 2020

Issei Tanaka (田仲 一成, Tanaka Issei; 1932 or 1933 – 29 March 2025) was a Japanese writer and professor at the Institute of Oriental Culture, University of Tokyo.

Tanaka was notable for writing about Chinese literature, publishing books that include, among others, The Social and Historical Content of Ming-Ch'ing Local Drama, and Development of Local Plays in the 17th and 18th Centuries.

Tanaka died on 30 March 2025, at the age of 92.

== Works ==
- 中国祭祀演劇研究. 1981.
