= Sébastien Lepetit =

French crime fiction writer (1969–2025)

- Born: 30 August 1969; Loudéac, France
- Died: 3 March 2025 (aged 55)
- Occupation: Crime fiction writer

Sébastien Lepetit (30 August 1969 – 3 March 2025) was a French crime fiction writer.

== Life and career ==
Born in Loudéac on 30 August 1969, Lepetit published his first crime fiction novel in 2013, Merde à Vauban, which was part of the Les Enquêtes du commissaire Morteau series. The novel's setting was the Fortifications of Vauban during their candidacy to become a World Heritage Site. The book received the readers' choice award in the Grand prix VSD du polar that year. In 2016, his second novel in the series, L'Origine du crime - Deux enterrements à Ornans, received the Prix polar du Lions Club de Rambouillet.

Lepetit died of colorectal cancer on 3 March 2025, at the age of 55.

== Works ==
=== Les Enquêtes du commissaire Morteau ===
- Merde à Vauban (2013)
- L’Origine du crime : deux enterrements à Ornans (2016)
- Il y aura du sang sur la neige (2018)

=== Les Mystères de l'Argentor ===
- Barnabé (2014)
- La Korrandine de Tevelune (2014)
