= Giuliano Boffardi =

Italian politician (1946–2025)

Member of the Chamber of Deputies of Italy for Liguria
- In office 2 April 1994 – 8 May 1996

Member of the Senate of the Republic of Italy for Liguria
- In office 23 April 1992 – 14 April 1994

Personal details
- Born: 10 March 1946; Genoa, Italy
- Died: 21 March 2025 (aged 79); Genoa, Italy
- Political party: PCI; PRC; Dem; SDI; PSI
- Occupation: Military officer

Giuliano Boffardi (10 March 1946 – 21 March 2025) was an Italian politician. A member of multiple political parties, he served in the Senate of the Republic from 1992 to 1994 and in the Chamber of Deputies from 1994 to 1996.

Boffardi died in Genoa on 21 March 2025, at the age of 79.
