= Zohra Rasekh =

Afghan doctor and women's rights activist (1969–2025)

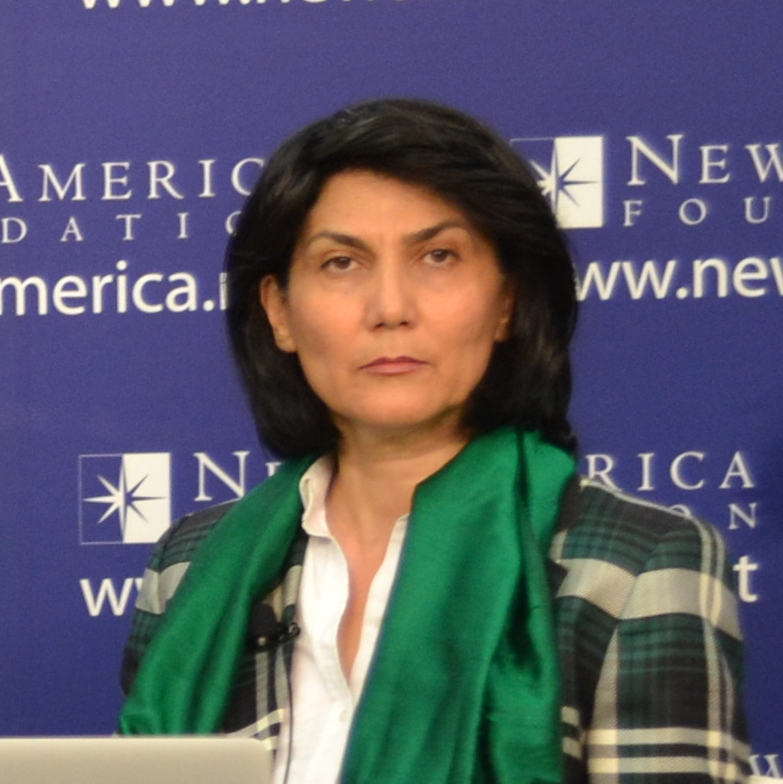
- Rasekh in 2013
- Born: 7 February 1969; Kabul, Afghanistan
- Died: 2025 (aged 55–56)
- Education: George Washington University; Harvard University
- Employer(s): Physicians for Human Rights (PHR); United Nations Committee on the Elimination of Discrimination against Women
- Organization: Global Watch Group (GWG)
- Notable work: The Taliban's War on Women: A Health and Human Rights Crisis in Afghanistan

Zohra Rasekh Kashanian (7 February 1969 – March 2025) was an Afghan doctor, women's rights activist and writer. She was the co-author of the report The Taliban's War on Women: A Health and Human Rights Crisis in Afghanistan and she was also a Founder and member of Global Watch Group (GWG), Physicians for Human Rights, and the United Nations Committee on the Elimination of Discrimination against Women.

== Biography ==
Rasekh was born on 7 February 1969 in Kabul, Afghanistan. She moved to the United States of America when she was 16 years old. She studied public health at George Washington University in Washington, D.C., United States. In 2006, she graduated from Harvard University with a certificate in Women and Security.

Rasekh was a Senior Health Researcher for the Boston-based Physicians for Human Rights (PHR). After spending 2 months in 1998 and 1999 interviewing almost 200 Afghani women in Afghanistan and in refugee camps in neighbouring Pakistan, Rasekh co-authored the report The Taliban's War on Women: A Health and Human Rights Crisis in Afghanistan. During her research trip, she was "chased by a young man wielding a metal cable because her wrists had been exposed in public." Through her work, Rasekh identified discriminatory policies against women living under the Taliban's rule, such as the demand that they wear a burqa at all times outside the home, and also claimed that 95% of women despised Taliban policies on women. She reported that women living in camps in Pakistan had a high rate of depression, displacement hardship, and related health problems.

In 2002, Rasekh contributed to write the book of Women for Afghan women: Shattering myths and claiming the future. She also attended the first public showing of Lorraine Sheinberg's documentary Shroud of Silence: Gender Apartheid in Afghanistan.

After the fall of the Taliban, in 2003 Rasekh was invited by the Foreign Minister of Afghanistan to become director of an office for gender affairs, health and human rights issues in Afghanistan. Rasekh was also president and CEO of the non-profit organization Global Watch Group (GWG), chaired Aid Afghanistan for Education, and was elected as vice-chair for the United Nations (UN) Committee on the Elimination of Discrimination against Women (CDEAW).

Rasekh died in March 2025.
