= Peter Webster (footballer) =

Australian rules footballer (1932–2025)

Personal information
- Full name: Peter Ronald Webster
- Born: 6 August 1932
- Died: 27 March 2025 (aged 92)
- Original team: Coburg High School
- Height: 183 cm (6 ft 0 in)
- Weight: 83 kg (183 lb)

Playing career
Years	Club	Games (Goals)
1953–59	Carlton	97 (6)

Peter Ronald Webster (6 August 1932 – 27 March 2025) was an Australian rules footballer who played with Carlton in the Victorian Football League (VFL). Webster died on 27 March 2025, at the age of 92.
