= Paula Alvarellos =

Spanish politician (1963–2025)

Mayor of Lugo
- In office 18 January 2024 – 1 March 2025
- Preceded by: Lara Méndez
- Succeeded by: Miguel Fernández

City councilor of Lugo
- In office 15 June 2019 – 1 March 2025

Personal details
- Born: Mercedes Paula Alvarellos Fondo; 21 February 1963 Ponteceso, Spain
- Died: 1 March 2025 (aged 62) La Coruña, Spain
- Party: Spanish Socialist Workers' Party (PSOE)
- Education: University of Santiago de Compostela; Centro de Estudios Financieros
- Profession: Lawyer, politician

Mercedes Paula Alvarellos Fondo (21 February 1963 – 1 March 2025) was a Spanish lawyer and politician in Galicia.

== Early life ==
Alvarellos earned a law degree from the University of Santiago de Compostela (USC) and later completed a Master's in Taxation and Financial Consulting at the Centro de Estudios Financieros.

== Career ==
She worked as a professor in the Master of Law program at USC in Lugo and collaborated as a professor at the IFFE Business School. She practiced as a lawyer and mediator in Lugo. She was a member of the Social Council of USC, and worked with the Galician Association of Consumers and Users (ACOUGA). She was involved in train express integration projects with the Concepción Arenal Association.

=== Politics ===
In 2019, Alvarellos entered politics as a member of the Spanish Socialist Workers' Party (PSOE) in Lugo. Following the 2019 municipal elections, she joined Mayor Lara Méndez's administration as Deputy Mayor and Head of the Economy, Human Resources, Urban Sustainability, and Internal Resources Department of the Lugo City Council.

On 18 January 2024, she was appointed Mayor of Lugo following the resignation of Lara Méndez, who stepped down to run in the Parliament of Galicia elections.

== Death ==
On 28 February 2025, during the opening ceremony of the Entroido festival, Alvarellos suffered a heart attack. She was initially stabilised at the Lucus Augusti University Hospital (HULA). However, her condition worsened, and she was transferred to a specialised cardiovascular center in La Coruña. She died there on 1 March, at the age of 62.
