= Fernando Sátiro =

Brazilian footballer (1937–2025)

Personal information
- Full name: Fernando Cordeiro Sátiro
- Date of birth: 4 June 1937
- Place of birth: Fortaleza, Ceará, Brazil
- Date of death: 16 March 2025 (aged 87)
- Place of death: Fortaleza, Ceará, Brazil
- Position: Midfielder

Youth career
- –1954: Gentilândia

Senior career*
| Years | Team | Apps | (Gls) |
| 1954–1958 | Gentilândia | | |
| 1958 | → Ceará (loan) | | |
| 1958–1961 | São Paulo | 93 | (2) |
| 1961–1963 | XV de Piracicaba | | |
| 1963–1965 | Ferroviária | | |
| 1966–1967 | Fortaleza | | |
| 1967 | Uberaba | | |
- * Club domestic league appearances and goals as of 28 September 2023

Fernando Cordeiro Sátiro (4 June 1937 – 16 March 2025) was a Brazilian professional footballer, who played as a midfielder.

== Career ==
Champion for the modest Gentilândia in 1956, right midfielder Sátiro was the biggest highlight of that team. Loaned to Ceará, he stood out in a friendly game against São Paulo, and his signing was therefore requested. Sátiro was present at the opening game of the Estádio do Morumbi, and provided the assist for Peixinho's goal.

== Death ==
Sátiro died at his home in the city of Fortaleza, on 16 March 2025, at the age of 87.

== Honours ==
Gentilândia

- Campeonato Cearense: 1956
