= Rasheed Ijaodola =

Nigerian lawyer

- Born: Rasheed Lawal Jimoh Ijaodola; Offa, Nigeria
- Died: 16 March 2025
- Burial place: Offa, Nigeria
- Citizenship: Nigerian
- Education: University of Lagos
- Organization: Nigerian Bar Association

Rasheed Lawal Jimoh Ijaodola was a Nigerian legal practitioner specializing in constitutional law and election matters. He was a Senior Advocate of Nigeria (SAN) and a member of the Nigerian Bar Association, Ilorin Branch, until his death.

== Early life and education ==
Ijaodola was a native of Offa in Offa Local Government Area of Kwara State. He attended a Catholic primary school in Ghana and held his first degree and MSc in law from the University of Lagos as well as a PhD in Christian Studies and three other doctorate degrees, despite being a Muslim.

== Legal career ==
Ijaodola was called to bar on July 30, 1984.

== Academic career ==
Prior to his death Ijaodola was the Dean of Law, Igbinedion University, Okada, in Edo State Nigeria and previously served as a lecturer of law at the University of Ilorin.
