= Kåre Aasgaard =

Norwegian footballer (1933–2025)

Personal information
- Full name: Kåre Nikolai Aasgaard
- Date of birth: 2 November 1933
- Place of birth: Drammen, Norway
- Date of death: 19 March 2025 (aged 91)
- Place of death: Oslo, Norway
- Position: Goalkeeper

Senior career*
Years	Team	Apps	(Gls)
1948–1973	Åssiden		

International career
1960	Norway	1	(0)
- * Club domestic league appearances and goals

Kåre Aasgaard (2 November 1933 – 19 March 2025) was a Norwegian footballer. A native of Drammen, Aasgaard was a goalkeeper who spent his entire 25-year career at his local team Åssiden, where he played more than 700 first-team games in all competitions (including friendlies) from 1948 until 1973.

Despite never playing in the first tier of Norwegian football at any point of his career, Aasgaard was selected for the Norway national team in 1960, having previously been a youth international. Aasgaard played one match for the senior national team, a 6–3 win against Finland on 28 August 1960. This match is also notable because 17-year-old Roald Jensen scored in the first half, becoming Norway's youngest-ever goalscorer.
