= Alan Self =

Australian rules footballer (1944–2025)

Personal information
- Full name: Alan William Self
- Born: 12 July 1944
- Died: 1 March 2025 (aged 80)
- Original team: Spotswood
- Height: 183 cm (6 ft 0 in)
- Weight: 80 kg (176 lb)

Playing career
| Years | Club | Games (Goals) |
| 1962–1966 | South Melbourne | 24 (12) |

Alan William Self (12 July 1944 – 1 March 2025) was an Australian rules footballer who played with the South Melbourne Football Club in the Victorian Football League (VFL). Self died on 1 March 2025, at the age of 80.
