= Yuki Furuta =

Japanese judge (1942–2025)

Yuki Furuta (古田 佑紀, Furuta Yūki, April 8, 1942 – March 20, 2025) was a member of the Supreme Court of Japan. He died from pneumonia on March 20, 2025, at the age of 82.
