= Blanca Castilla de Cortázar Larrea =

Spanish philosopher and anthropologist (1951–2025)

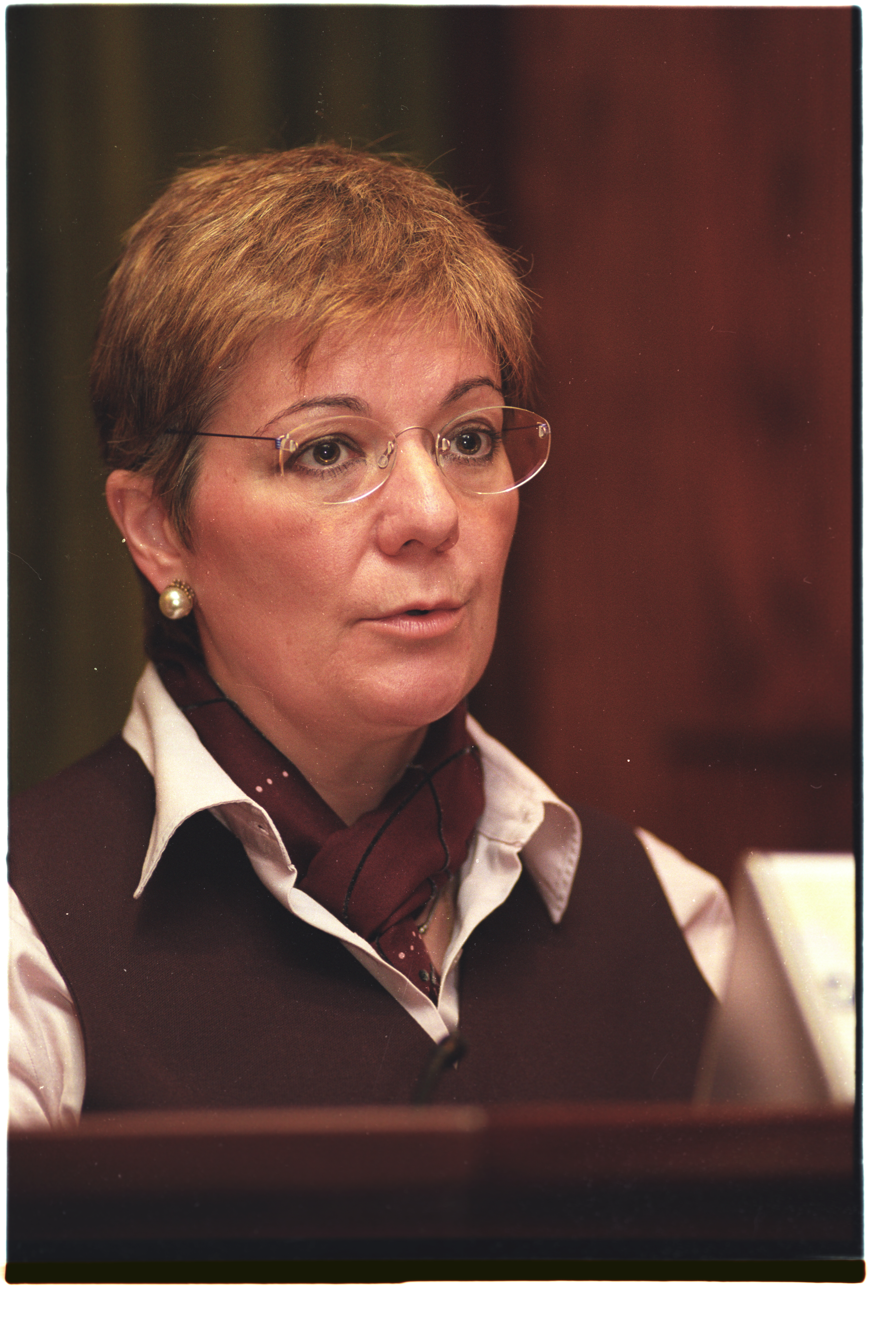
- Blanca Castilla in 2010
- Born: 25 July 1951
- Died: 11 March 2025 (aged 73)

Blanca Castilla de Cortázar Larrea (25 July 1951 – 11 March 2025) was a Spanish philosopher, theologian, and anthropologist.

== Life and career ==
In 1973, Blanca graduated with a degree in Philosophy and completed a doctorate in Theology at the University of Navarra with the thesis "Passio Christi ex Caritate", supervised by Lucas F. Mateo Seco (1981). She also received her doctorate in Philosophy with the thesis: "Notion of Person in Xavier Zubiri: An Approach to Gender", supervised by Alfonso López Quintás (1994), and completed a Master's degree in Anthropology from the Complutense University of Madrid. She was an Honorary Research Fellow at the University of Glasgow. She was also the director of two colleges: the Alcor College (1983-1995) at the Complutense University and the Goroabe College (1977-1983) at the University of Navarra.

She taught as an Anthropology professor at the Villanueva University Center affiliated with the Complutense University, the Juan Pablo II Theological Institute (Madrid), and the International University of La Rioja. She also worked at other centers: the European School of Education, the Valencian Institute of Fertility, Sexuality, and Family Relations (IVAF), and the Center for Theology (Getafe).

Throughout her teaching and research career, she has collaborated with various Spanish universities: Complutense, Navarra, San Pablo CEU, Literaria de Valencia. She has also worked with various American universities: Catholic and Los Andes (Chile), Piura (Peru), Iberoamericana (Mexico City) and La Sabana (Colombia), as well as the Ateneo Regina Apostolorum (Rome).

She has studied authors such as Gabriel Marcel, Thomas Aquinas, Xavier Zubiri, Ludwig Feuerbach, Karol Wojtyła and Leonardo Polo. She has also explored topics of Gender Anthropology: the male-female sexual difference, shedding light on the problem of gender theory and feminism. She is the author of more than one hundred articles in specialized magazines and books in print.

A numerary of Opus Dei, she was one of the most important Spanish-speaking Catholic intellectuals.

Blanca Castilla de Cortazar died on 11 March 2025, due to cancer.

== Selected works ==
- La Antropología de Feuerbach y sus claves
- Antropología del amor : estructura esponsal de la persona
- La Complementariedad Varon-Mujer : nuevas hipótesis
- Las coordenadas de la estructuración del Yo. Compromiso y fidelidad según Gabriel Marcel
- Dignidad personal y condición sexuada : un proseguir en antropología
- Los discursos sobre el género : algunas influencias en el ordenamiento jurídico español
- El Espíritu Santo en la Trinidad y su imagen humana discurso de ingreso de la Excma. Sra. Dra. Dª Blanca Castilla Cortázar. Dios y antropología
- ¿Fué creado el varón antes que la mujer? : reflexiones en torno a la antropología de la creación
- Metafísica de la familia
- Noción de persona en Xavier Zubiri ; una aproximación al género
- Persona femenina persona masculina
- Persona y género : ser varón y ser mujer
- Varón y mujer : teología del cuerpo
