= Eliyahu Fink =

American rabbi and writer (died 2025)

Eliyahu Fink (died 2025) was an American Orthodox Rabbi, lawyer, and writer. He was known for taking a moderate and open approach to societal and theological issues, which often placed him at odds with other Orthodox Jewish Rabbis.

== Life and career ==
Fink was born into an Orthodox Jewish family. His father, Aaron Fink, is an Orthodox Rabbi, as were his grandfather and great-grandfather. Fink studied Talmudic law at Yeshivas Ner Yisroel and earned a Juris Doctor from Loyola Law School. From 2013 to 2018 he was the rabbi of the Pacific Jewish Center in Los Angeles. In 2013 he appeared on an episode of the National Geographic show Church Rescue. In 2014 he was named one of "America's Most Inspiring Rabbis" by The Forward. In 2018 he moved to Monsey, New York, where he wrote and worked in the Jewish education industry.

Fink's writing was focused on the Orthodox Jewish community. He answered theological questions on a blog titled "Fink or Swim" and wrote articles for The Jewish Press and The Forward. His writing was characterized by The Times of Israel as being both compassionate and in tension with mainstream Orthodox Jewish thinkers, especially when it came to issues of LGBTQ inclusion in Orthodox communities. In addition to his writing, Fink organized events to bring ultra-Orthodox, Orthodox, and moderate Jews together to discuss societal and theological issues.

In 2016, Fink wrote an article predicting an approaching schism in Judaism driven by technology. The article attracted rebuttal in The Jerusalem Post.

== Personal life ==
Fink was married and had three children. He died in a car accident on March 21, 2025. Fink's death received widespread coverage from Jewish media organizations. The Jewish Journal of Greater Los Angeles described him as having a "rare ability to connect across backgrounds and beliefs."
