= Claude Dhinnin =

French politician (1934–2025)

Deputy of the French National Assembly
- In office 23 June 1988 – 21 April 1997
- Preceded by: Jacqueline Osselin (1986)
- Succeeded by: Alain Cacheux
- Constituency: Nord's 3rd constituency
- In office 2 April 1986 – 14 May 1988
- Constituency: Nord
- In office 13 May 1973 – 22 May 1981
- Preceded by: Pierre Billecocq
- Succeeded by: Jacqueline Osselin
- Constituency: Nord's 3rd constituency

Mayor of La Madeleine
- In office 1977–2008
- Preceded by: Pierre Billecocq
- Succeeded by: Sébastien Leprêtre

Member of the General Council of Nord
- In office 1976–1988
- Preceded by: Alain Le Marc'hadour
- Succeeded by: Jean-Claude Debus
- Constituency: Canton of Lille-Nord

Personal details
- Born: 11 September 1934; Lille, France
- Died: 14 March 2025 (aged 90)
- Political party: RPR

Claude Dhinnin (11 September 1934 – 14 March 2025) was a French politician of the Rally for the Republic (RPR).

== Life and career ==
Dhinnin served as mayor of La Madeleine from 1977 to 2008 and was named a Knight of the Legion of Honour in 1998. From 1973 to 1981 and again from 1986 to 1997, he represented the department of Nord in the National Assembly.

Dhinnin died on 14 March 2025, at the age of 90.
