= Nandalala (poet) =

Indian poet

Neduncheliyan Singaravelu popularly known as Nandalala (1955/1956 – 4 March 2025) was a Tamil Nadu-based poet and public speaker. He was the Vice President of the Tamil Nadu Progressive Writers Artists Association and general council member of Tamil Nadu Eyal Isai Nataka Mandram. Nandalala was born in Kunnandar Koil in Pudukkottai District of Tamil Nadu and started his career as a bank employee and has spoken as public speaker on the platforms of various organizations including educational institutions. He is survived by his wife Jayanthi and two daughters, Barathi and Nivedida at Thiruchirapalli.

== Death ==
Nandalala died aged 69 on 4 March 2025, at a hospital in Bengaluru where he had undergone treatment for heart problems.

== Books ==
- திருச்சிராப்பள்ளி: ஊரும் வரலாறு (Thiruchirapalli: Oorum Varalarum):(Tamil Edition)-2024
