= Eugeniusz Lewacki =

Polish ice hockey player (1926–2025)

- Born: 24 January 1926; Kraków, Poland
- Died: 23 March 2025 (aged 99)
- Height: 5 ft 9 in (175 cm)
- Weight: 155 lb (70 kg; 11 st 1 lb)
- Position: Centre
- Played for: KTH Krynica; Gwardia Bydgoszcz
- National team: Poland
- Playing career: 1946–1957

Eugeniusz Stanislaw Lewacki (24 January 1926 – 23 March 2025) was a Polish ice hockey center and Olympian. Lewacki played for Poland at the 1948 Winter Olympics and 1952 Winter Olympics. He also played for KTH Krynica and Gwardia Bydgoszcz in the Polish Hockey League. Lewacki died on 25 March 2025, at the age of 99.
