= Pilar Viladas =

Writer and editor

Pilar Viladas (died March 15, 2025) was a writer and editor who focused on architecture and design. She was the design editor of The New York Times Magazine.

In 2005, she published the book Domesticities: At Home with The New York Times Magazine, a collection of interior design studies from The New York Times Magazine.
