= 2025 in India =

- Centuries: 19th; 20th; 21st
- Decades: 2000s; 2010s; 2020s
- See also: List of years in India; Timeline of Indian history

The following is a list of events for the year 2025 in India.

== Incumbents ==
=== National government ===
Position	Name	Image	Since
President of India	Droupadi Murmu (Age 67)		25 July 2022
Vice-President of India/ Chairman of Rajya Sabha	C. P. Radhakrishnan (Age 68)		12 September 2025
Prime Minister of India	Narendra Modi (Age 75)	Narendra Modi	26 May 2014
Chief Justice of India	Surya Kant (Age 63)		24 November 2025
Speaker of the Lok Sabha	Om Birla (Age 62)		19 June 2019
Chief Election Commissioner of India	Gyanesh Kumar (Age 61)		19 February 2025
Chief of Defence Staff	Anil Chauhan (Age 64)		30 September 2022
Governor of Reserve Bank of India	Sanjay Malhotra (Age 57)		11 December 2024
Lok Sabha	18th Lok Sabha		24 June 2024

=== State governments ===
State	Governor	Chief Minister	Party	Political alliance	Chief Justice
Andhra Pradesh	S. Abdul Nazeer	N. Chandrababu Naidu	TDP	N.D.A.	Dhiraj Singh Thakur
Arunachal Pradesh	Kaiwalya Trivikram Parnaik	Pema Khandu	BJP	N.D.A.	Vijay Bishnoi
Assam	Lakshman Prasad Acharya	Himanta Biswa Sarma	BJP	N.D.A.	Vijay Bishnoi
Bihar	Arif Mohammad Khan	Nitish Kumar	JD(U)	N.D.A.	K. Vinod Chandran
Chhattisgarh	Ramen Deka	Vishnu Deo Sai	BJP	N.D.A.	Ramesh Sinha
Goa	Ashok Gajapathi Raju	Pramod Sawant	BJP	N.D.A.	Devendra Kumar Upadhyaya
Gujarat	Acharya Dev Vrat	Bhupendrabhai Patel	BJP	N.D.A.	Sunita Agarwal
Haryana	Ashim Kumar Ghosh	Nayab Singh Saini	BJP	N.D.A.	Sheel Nagu
Himachal Pradesh	Shiv Pratap Shukla	Sukhvinder Singh Sukhu	INC	I.N.D.I.A	M. S. Ramachandra Rao
Jharkhand	Santosh Kumar Gangwar	Hemant Soren	JMM	I.N.D.I.A	M. S. Ramachandra Rao
Karnataka	Thawar Chand Gehlot	Siddaramaiah	INC	I.N.D.I.A	Nilay Vipinchandra Anjaria
Kerala	Rajendra Arlekar	Pinarayi Vijayan	CPI(M)	I.N.D.I.A	Nitin Madhukar Jamdar
Madhya Pradesh	Mangubhai Patel	Mohan Yadav	BJP	N.D.A.	Suresh Kumar Kait
Maharashtra	Acharya Devvrat	Devendra Fadnavis	BJP	N.D.A.	Devendra Kumar Upadhyaya
Manipur	Ajay Kumar Bhalla	President's rule	BJP	N.D.A.	Siddharth Mridul
Meghalaya	C. H. Vijayashankar	Conrad Sangma	NPP	N.D.A.	S. Vaidyanathan
Mizoram	V. K. Singh	Lalduhoma	ZPM	Regional	Vijay Bishnoi
Nagaland	Ajay Kumar Bhalla	Neiphiu Rio	NDPP	N.D.A.	Vijay Bishnoi
Odisha	Kambhampati Hari Babu	Mohan Charan Majhi	BJP	N.D.A.	Chakradhari Sharan Singh
Punjab	Gulab Chand Kataria	Bhagwant Mann	AAP	Regional	Sheel Nagu
Rajasthan	Haribhau Kisanrau Bagde	Bhajan Lal Sharma	BJP	N.D.A.	Manindra Mohan Shrivastava
Sikkim	Om Prakash Mathur	Prem Singh Tamang	SKM	N.D.A.	Biswanath Somadder
Tamil Nadu	R. N. Ravi	M. K. Stalin	DMK	I.N.D.I.A	Sanjay V. Gangapurwala
Telangana	Jishnu Dev Verma	Revanth Reddy	INC	I.N.D.I.A	Alok Aradhe
Tripura	N. Indrasena Reddy	Manik Saha	BJP	N.D.A.	Aparesh Kumar Singh
Uttarakhand	Gurmit Singh	Pushkar Singh Dhami	BJP	N.D.A.	Guhanathan Narendar
Uttar Pradesh	Anandiben Patel	Yogi Adityanath	BJP	N.D.A.	Arun Bhansali
West Bengal	C. V. Ananda Bose	Mamata Banerjee	AITC	I.N.D.I.A	T. S. Sivagnanam

=== Union territory governments ===
State	Lieutenant governor and Administrators	Chief Minister	Party	Political alliance	Chief Justice
Andaman and Nicobar Islands	Devendra Kumar Joshi (Lieutenant governor)	✗	✗	✗	T. S. Sivagnanam (Calcutta High Court)
Chandigarh	Gulab Chand Kataria (Administrators)	✗	✗	✗	Sheel Nagu (Punjab and Haryana High Court)
Dadra and Nagar Haveli and Daman and Diu	Praful Khoda Patel (Administrators)	✗	✗	✗	Alok Aradhe (Bombay High Court)
Delhi	Vinai Kumar Saxena (Lieutenant governor)	Rekha Gupta	BJP	N.D.A.	Devendra Kumar Upadhyaya (Delhi High Court)
Jammu and Kashmir	Manoj Sinha (Lieutenant governor)	Omar Abdullah	JKNC	I.N.D.I.A	Arun Palli (High Court of Jammu and Kashmir and Ladakh)
Ladakh	Kavinder Gupta (Lieutenant governor)	✗	✗	✗	Arun Palli (High Court of Jammu and Kashmir and Ladakh)
Lakshadweep	Praful Khoda Patel (Administrators)	✗	✗	✗	Nitin Madhukar Jamdar (Kerala High Court)
Puducherry	Kuniyil Kailashnathan (Lieutenant governor)	N. Rangaswamy	AINRC	N.D.A.	Kalpathi Rajendran Shriram (Madras High Court)

== Events ==
=== January ===
- 1 January – Five female members of the same family are fatally stabbed in a suspected honour killing by a relative in Lucknow.
- 3 January –
  - The body of journalist Mukesh Chandrakar, who went missing on 1 January, is found inside a septic tank at a compound belonging to a road construction contractor in Bijapur, Chhattisgarh.
  - The first HMPV Virus case in India is detected in Bengaluru, Karnataka.
- 5 January – A HAL Dhruv helicopter of the Indian Coast Guard crashes during a training flight in Porbandar, Gujarat, killing all the three crew members.
- 6 January –
  - 2025 Bijapur Naxal attack: Nine people, including eight police officers, are killed after their vehicle hits a landmine planted by Naxalites in Bijapur district, Chhattisgarh.
  - Nine miners are killed in the flooding of a coal mine in Dima Hasao, Assam.
- 8 January – At least six people are killed and many others are injured in a stampede at the Venkateswara Temple, Tirumala in Tirupati, Andhra Pradesh.
- 9 January – Larsen & Toubro chairman S. N. Subrahmanyan's statement on a 90-hour work week and working day on Sunday sparks outrage and debate on work–life balance.
- 13 January – The Sonamarg Tunnel in Jammu and Kashmir is inaugurated in a ceremony attended by Prime Minister Narendra Modi.
- 13 January–26 February: 2025 Prayag Maha Kumbh Mela.
- 16 January – Actor Saif Ali Khan is stabbed multiple times, allegedly by an illegal Bangladeshi national, during an attempted robbery at his Mumbai residence.
- 18 January – 2024 Kolkata rape and murder : Sanjay Roy is convicted in the 2024 Kolkata rape and murder case by the Sealdah court in Kolkata, West Bengal.
- 19 January – A fire caused by an exploding gas cylinder destroys at least 18 temporary tents at the 2025 Prayag Maha Kumbh Mela festival grounds. No injuries are reported.
- 20 January – 2024 Kolkata rape and murder: The Sealdah Court in Kolkata sentences Sanjay Roy to rigorous life imprisonment following his conviction in the 2024 Kolkata rape and murder case.
- 22 January –
  - Thirteen people are killed and five others are injured after a passenger train collides with a group of people that disembarked from another train following a false fire alarm near Pachora, Maharashtra.
  - A truck falls into a ravine along National Highway 63 in Yellapur, Karnataka, killing 10 people and injuring 15 others.
- 23 January – Tamil Nadu's Chief Minister M. K. Stalin releases the report Antiquity of Iron: Recent Radiometric Dates from Tamil Nadu, declaring that the Iron Age began in Tamil Nadu “[s]ome 5,300 years ago", based on AMS and OSL dating of samples from sites such as Sivagalai (Thoothukudi district), Adichanallur (Tirunelveli district), and Mayiladumparai (Krishnagiri district).
- 24 January – Nine people are killed in an explosion at an ordnance factory in Bhandara, Maharashtra.
- 29 January – 2025 Prayag Maha Kumbh Mela crowd crush: At least 30 people are killed and more than 60 are injured in a crowd crush at the 2025 Prayag Maha Kumbh Mela in Prayagraj, Uttar Pradesh.

=== February ===
- 1 February – NAAC rating bribery case: The CBI arrests the chairman and six members of NAAC for accepting bribes for a favorable NAAC rating.
- 2 February – A bus carrying pilgrims falls into a gorge near Saputara, Gujarat, killing five people and injuring 35 others.
- 5 February – 2025 Delhi Legislative Assembly election: The Bharatiya Janata Party wins a two-thirds majority in the Delhi Legislative Assembly.
- 6 February – A Dassault Mirage 2000 fighter jet of the Indian Air Force crashes in Shivpuri district, Madhya Pradesh. The two pilots on board eject safely.
- 9 February –
  - Thirty-one Naxalites and two military personnel are killed in the 2025 Bijapur clash.
  - N. Biren Singh resigns as the Chief Minister Of Manipur amid ongoing ethnic violence in the state.
- 10 February – Ranveer Allahbadia's remarks on the show India's Got Latent sparks nation-wide outrage and debate on free speech and laws on obscene content on social media.
- 13 February – The Union Government imposes President's rule in Manipur amid ongoing ethnic violence in the state.
- 14 February – A series of police raids on bookstores are carried out in Jammu and Kashmir, resulting in the seizure of 668 books released by a publishing house associated with the outlawed Islamic organisation Jamaat-e-Islami.
- 15 February –
  - An SUV carrying pilgrims to the 2025 Prayag Maha Kumbh Mela collides with a bus in Prayagraj, killing all ten people aboard the SUV.
  - At least 18 people are killed in a crowd crush at New Delhi railway station.
- 16 February – Suicide of Prakriti Lamsal.
- 19 February – The BJP names Rekha Gupta as Chief Minister of Delhi.
- 21 February –
  - The Invest Kerala Global Summit is held by the Kerala state government.
  - The Drugs Controller General of India orders a ban on the manufacture and export of the opioids tapentadol and carisoprodol following reports of widespread addiction and deaths caused by the said drugs in West African countries.
- 22 February –
  - An SUV crashes into a truck near Dhanbad while traveling to the 2025 Prayag Maha Kumbh Mela, killing six people and injuring two others.
  - The Srisaliam Left Bank Canal collapses in Nagarkurnool district, Telangana, leaving eight workers missing.
- 26 February – An army truck is attacked by militants in Rajouri district, Jammu and Kashmir.
- 28 February – An avalanche hits a Border Roads Organisation camp in Mana, Uttarakhand, killing eight people.

=== March ===
- 1 March – Delhi orders a ban on vehicles aged 10 years and above from refuelling inside city limits effective 31 March due to air pollution concerns.
- 7 March –
  - A SEPECAT Jaguar of the Indian Air Force crashes during a training exercise in Panchkula district, Haryana. The pilot ejects safely.
  - An Antonov An-32 of the Indian Air Force crashes on landing at Bagdogra Airport in West Bengal. No fatalities are reported.
- 9 March – India wins the 2025 ICC Champions Trophy for a record third time, in Dubai.
- 17 March – 2025 Nagpur violence: At least 30 people are injured in clashes demanding the removal of the tomb of the Mughal emperor Aurangzeb in Nagpur, Maharashtra.
- 18 March – Three people are convicted and sentenced to death by a special court in Mainpuri for the killing of 24 Dalits in the village of Dehuli, Uttar Pradesh in 1981.
- 20 March – Thirty Naxalites and one military personnel are killed in clashes between police and naxalites in Dantewada district and Kanker district, Chhattisgarh.
- 27 March – Four police officers and three militants are killed in clashes in Kathua District, Jammu and Kashmir.
- 29 March – Sixteen Naxalites are killed in clashes with police in Sukma district, Chhattisgarh.
- 30 March – Eleven cars of a Bengaluru-Kamakhya train derail near Nirgundi Train Station in Cuttack, killing one person and injuring eight others.
- 31 March – Eight members of the same family are killed in an explosion caused by a gas cylinder at a house that doubled as an illegal firecracker factory in Patharpratima, West Bengal.

=== April ===
- 1 April –
  - At least 21 people are killed in an explosion at an illegal fireworks factory in Deesa, Gujarat.
  - Two trains collide near Sahebganj, Jharkhand, killing two people and injuring four others.
- 2 April –
  - 2025 India–Pakistan heat wave: India and Pakistan are struck by a heatwave with temperatures nearing 47 °C to 53 °C in several regions. The event is linked to climate change and shifting weather patterns across South Asia.
  - A SEPECAT Jaguar fighter jet of the Indian Air Force crashes in Jamnagar district, Gujarat, killing a pilot and injuring another.
- 5 April – The Waqf (Amendment) Act, 2025 comes into effect replacing the Mussalman Wakf Act, 1923 and amend the Waqf Act, 1995.
- 8 April – Murshidabad violence: Three people are killed in clashes in protest against the Waqf (Amendment) Act, 2025 in Murshidabad, West Bengal.
- 10 April – Tahawwur Hussain Rana, a Pakistani-born Canadian national and terrorist wanted by India for his role in the 26/11 attacks, arrives in Delhi following his arrest and extradition from the United States.
- 12 April – 2025 Nainital child sexual assault case: A 12-year-old girl is raped by a 73-year-old man in Nainital, Uttarakhand.
- 19 April – Eleven people are killed in the collapse of a residential building in New Delhi.
- 21 April – The Central Government declares a three-day state mourning period over the death of Pope Francis.
- 22 April – 2025 Pahalgam attack: At least 26 people are killed in an attack by terrorists on a group of tourists visiting Pahalgam, Jammu and Kashmir. The Resistance Front (TRF), an offshoot of the Pakistan-based, UN-designated terrorist group, Lashkar-e-Taiba, claims responsibility for the attack.
- 23 April – India suspends the Indus Waters Treaty in response to the 2025 Pahalgam attack.
- 25 April – 2025 India–Pakistan standoff: Indian and Pakistani soldiers briefly exchange fire along the Line of Control.
- 27 April – A van collides with a bicycle before plunging into a well in Mandsaur district, Madhya Pradesh, killing 12 people and injuring four others.
- 28 April – India signs a contract to purchase 26 Rafale fighter jets from France.
- 29 April – Fourteen people are killed in a fire at the Rituraj Hotel in Kolkata.
- 30 April – The Government of India announces that it will conduct a Caste census.

=== May ===
- 3 May – At least six people are killed in a crowd crush during a Hindu festival at the Sree Lairai Devi temple in Shirgao, Goa.
- 4 May – Leader of the Opposition in Lok Sabha Rahul Gandhi states that he was "wasn’t there during many Congress’ mistakes, but happy to take responsibility" of the 1984 anti-Sikh riots.
- 5 May – A mob beats a man to death for allegedly yelling Pakistan Zindabad at a cricket match in Kudupu, Karnataka. Fifteen people are arrested.
- 7 May –
  - 2025 India civil defence mock drill: A mock drill is organised by the Ministry of Home Affairs (India) in 244 districts of India in response to tensions with Pakistan following the 2025 Pahalgam attack.
  - At least 15 Naxalites are killed in clashes with security forces in Bijapur district, Chhattisgarh.
- 7 May – 10 May – 2025 India–Pakistan conflict: The Indian Army and the Indian Air Force conduct surgical strikes code-named 'Operation Sindoor' on targets in Pakistan in response to the 2025 Pahalgam attack.
- 10 May – 2025 India–Pakistan conflict: India and Pakistan reach a ceasefire agreement.
- 12 May – Cricketer Virat Kohli announces his retirement from Test cricket.
- 13 May –
  - Three militants are killed in a shootout with security forces in Shopian district, Jammu and Kashmir.
  - At least 14 people are reported dead after consuming tainted liquor in the Amritsar area.
- 14 May –
  - The Government announces the successful Operation Black Forest against Naxal insurgents.
  - 10 militants are killed in a gunfight with security forces in Chandel district, Manipur.
- 15 May – Three JeM militants are killed in a shootout with security forces in Awantipora district, Jammu and Kashmir.
- 16 May – A Sudanese student, Mohamed Wada of Lovely Professional University is fatally stabbed by six other students after attempting with his cousin try to stop them from harassing their female friends.
- 17 May – India bans Bangladeshi ready-made garments from being exported through their common land borders.
- 18 May – At least 17 people are killed in the 2025 Gulzar Houz fire in Hyderabad.
- 19 May – The EOS-09 satellite fails shortly after launch from Satish Dhawan Space Centre.
- 20 May –
  - Five people are killed in rain-related incidents in Bengaluru.
  - Karnataka-based writer Banu Mushtaq wins the 2025 International Booker Prize for her short story anthology Heart Lamp, which is also the first Kannada language work to win the award.
- 21 May – 2025 Abujhmarh clash: Twenty-seven Naxalites are killed in clashes with police in Abujhmarh, Narayanpur district, Chhattisgarh.
- 23 May – Murder of Raja Raghuvanshi.
- 24 May – The Liberian cargo vessel MSC ELSA 3 sinks off the coast of Kerala. All 24 people on board are rescued.
- 27 May – Former Wrestling Federation of India head Brij Bhushan Sharan Singh is cleared by a court in Delhi in one count of sexual harassment filed by a minor female wrestler.
- 28 May – Punjilal Meher is convicted and sentenced to life imprisonment for the Patnagarh bombing that killed two people in Odisha in 2018.
- 31 May –
  - The Miss World 2025 pageant is held in Hyderabad, with India's Nandini Gupta finishing in the Top 20.
  - At least five people are reported killed in flooding and landslides in Assam.

=== June ===
- 1 June – Three soldiers are killed in a landslide at an army camp in Chaten, Sikkim.
- 4 June – At least 11 people are killed in a crowd crush during celebrations for Royal Challengers Bengaluru's victory in the Indian Premier League in Bengaluru.
- 6 June – The Udhampur–Baramulla railway in Jammu and Kashmir is inaugurated in a ceremony attended by Prime Minister Narendra Modi.
- 7 June – 2023–2025 Manipur violence: The leader of the armed Meitei group Arambai Tenggol, Asem Kanan Singh, is arrested along with four other officials in Imphal Airport, resulting in unrest across Manipur.
- 9 June –
  - A police officer is killed in a bomb attack by Naxalites in Sukma district, Chhattisgarh.
  - The Singapore-flagged cargo vessel MV Wan Hai 503 catches fire off the coast of Kerala, leaving four sailors missing.
  - At least four people are killed and several others are injured after falling off an overcrowded train between the Diva and Kopar railway stations in Mumbai.
- 12 June – Air India Flight 171: A Boeing 787-8 Dreamliner passenger aircraft operated by Air India crashes shortly after takeoff from Ahmedabad Airport, killing 260 people.
- 14 June – At least 328 guns and 9,300 rounds of ammunition are recovered in a joint operation by security forces in Manipur amid ongoing ethnic violence in the state.
- 15 June – 15 July – 2025 Rajya Sabha elections.
- 15 June –
  - Four people are killed and 32 are injured in a bridge collapse near the Indrayani River in Pune.
  - Seven people are killed in a helicopter crash in Kedarnath, Uttarakhand.
- 17 June – India and Canada announce an agreement to restore normal diplomatic relations following a dispute that began in 2023 over the killing of Sikh separatist Hardeep Singh Nijjar in Vancouver.
- 22 June – Thirty-five Nepali youths are rescued from captivity in Kashipur, Uttarakhand, following a coordinated operation by the Nepali Embassy and Indian authorities.
- 25 June –
  - Shubhanshu Shukla becomes the second Indian, after Rakesh Sharma in 1984, to go to outer space, as group captain of the Axiom Mission 4 which takes off from the Kennedy Space Center in the United States.
  - At least three people are killed while 11 others are reported missing following flash floods in Himachal Pradesh.
- 26 June – At least three people are killed and nine others are injured after a bus crashes into the Alaknanda River in Rudraprayag, Uttarakhand.
- 29 June – At least three people are killed in a crowd crush at a Hindu festival near the Gundicha Temple in Puri, Odisha.
- 30 June – At least 44 people are killed and several others are injured in a chemical factory explosion at the Sigachi Industries pharmaceutical plant in Sangareddy, Telangana.

=== July ===
- 4 July – At least 203 guns are recovered in a joint operation by security forces in Manipur amid ongoing ethnic violence in the state.
- 5 July – X briefly withholds access to multiple Reuters accounts in India, citing a legal request under Section 69A of the Information Technology Act, 2000. The accounts are restored the next day.
- 6 July – Five members of a single family are killed after being accused of witchcraft in Tetgama, Bihar.
- 8 July – Ten people are killed and several others are injured when a fire and explosion cause eight rooms to collapse at a fireworks factory in Virudhunagar, Tamil Nadu.
  - Five members of a single family are killed after being accused of witchcraft in Bihar.
- 9 July –
  - Eleven people are killed in the collapse of the Gambhira-Mujpur bridge in Vadodara, Gujarat.
  - An Indian Air Force trainer aircraft crashes near Churu, Rajasthan, killing its two pilots.
  - A Russian woman and her two children are discovered living inside a cave in Ramatirtha Hill in Karnataka after staying there for a week.
- 10 July –
  - A magnitude 4.5 earthquake hits Haryana, killing two people in Meerut.
  - Murder of Radhika Yadav
- 11 July – The Maratha Military Landscapes of India are designated as World Heritage Sites by UNESCO.
- 14 July – A passenger train collides with a school bus in Cuddalore, killing three people and injuring two others.
- 15 July –
  - At least 86 guns and 974 rounds of ammunition are recovered in a joint operation by security forces in Manipur amid ongoing ethnic violence in the state.
  - Tesla launches the Model Y in India which is imported from China and the first Tesla first showroom in India was opened at the Bandra-Kurla Complex in Mumbai,

- 18 July – The Delhi High Court quashes FIRs registered in the 2020 Tablighi Jamaat case.
- 19 July – The Dharmasthala mass burials investigation, led by a Special Investigation Team, officially begin in Karnataka.
- 21 July –
  - The Bombay High Court acquits all 12 accused of the 2006 Mumbai train bombings due to lack of evidence from the prosecution. The decision is stayed by the Supreme Court on 24 July following an appeal from the Maharashtra state government.
  - Jagdeep Dhankhar resigns as the Vice President of India citing health reasons.
- 23 July – China–India relations: The government resumes issuing tourist visas to Chinese citizens, ending the five-year suspension following the 2020 border skirmishes.
- 25 July – Piplodi school roof collapse: Seven children are killed in a roof collapse at a school in Piplodi in Jhalawar district, Rajasthan.
- 26 July – At least 90 guns and 728 rounds of ammunition are recovered in a joint operation by security forces in Manipur amid ongoing ethnic violence in the state.
- 27 July –
  - Eight people are killed and twenty-eight others are injured in a crowd crush at the Mansa Devi temple in Haridwar.
  - Two Kerala Nuns are arrested in Durg Junction railway station in Chhattisgarh on charges of forced conversion and human trafficking following a complaint by Bajrang Dal.
- 28 July –
  - Operation Mahadev: Three LeT militants including the mastermind of the 2025 Pahalgam attack are killed in a joint operation by security forces in Srinagar, Jammu and Kashmir.
  - At least 155 guns and 1,652 rounds of ammunition are recovered in a joint operation by security forces in Manipur amid ongoing ethnic violence in the state.
  - Divya Deshmukh wins the Women's Chess World Cup 2025 after defeating Koneru Humpy in the final round.
- 28 July – 30 July – A special discussion on Operation Sindoor is held in the Lok Sabha and the Rajya Sabha amid opposition protests on the Special Intensive Rolls Revision in Bihar.
- 29 July – At least 18 people on a Kanwar Yatra pilgrimage are killed in a bus accident in Deoghar, Jharkhand.
- 30 July –
  - NASA-ISRO Synthetic Aperture Radar (NISAR), a joint project between NASA and ISRO to co-develop and launch a dual-frequency synthetic aperture radar satellite that is used for remote sensing, is launched into space. It is the first dual-band radar imaging satellite.
  - The Ministry of Culture announces the repatriation of the Piprahwa gems, which were taken out of the country during British rule and subjected to an attempted auction by Sotheby's in May.
- 31 July –
  - US President Donald Trump imposes a 25% tariff on Indian exports to the United States in part due to Indian purchases of oil from Russia.
  - A special NIA court acquits former MP Pragya Singh Thakur and five others in the 2006 Malegaon bombings.

=== August ===
- 1 August –
  - Prajwal Revanna is convicted of rape by a special court in Bengaluru. He is sentenced to rigorous life imprisonment the next day.
  - Vietnamese automaker VinFast begins production at a US$500 million factory in Thoothukudi, Tamil Nadu, as part of an investment that will create over 3,000 jobs.
  - Allegations and protests against poor conduct of Staff Selection Commission exams and inferior quality of Eduquity Career Technologies, which conducts the exam.
- 3 August – Eleven persons are killed and four others are injured critically after their SUV plunges into a canal in Gonda, Uttar Pradesh.
- 5 August –
  - 2025 Uttarakhand flash flood: Five people are killed while more than 100 others are reported missing in flash flooding in Uttarkashi, Uttarakhand.
  - The government bans the possession and sale of 25 books in Jammu and Kashmir, including works by Arundhati Roy, A.G. Noorani, Sumantra Bose, Christopher Snedden and Victoria Schofield.
- 6 August – US president Donald Trump imposes 50% tariffs on exports from India effective 27 August.
- 7 August –
  - 2025 Indian electoral controversy: Rahul Gandhi alleges systemic voter list fraud done by the Election Commission of India in connivance with the Bharatiya Janata Party in multiple elections.
  - Three CRPF personnel are killed and ten others are injured after their vehicle plunges into a gorge in the Basantgarh area of Udhampur, Jammu and Kashmir.
- 8 August – Two soldiers and one militant are killed in clashes in Kulgam District, Jammu and Kashmir.
- 9 August – Four teachers from a private coaching centre are killed after their car plunges into the Mazum River from a bridge in Modasa, Aravalli district, Gujarat.
- 11 August –
  - The Supreme Court orders the government of Delhi to transfer all stray dogs in the territory to animal shelters within eight weeks, citing risks caused by dog bites and rabies. Following an appeal, the court modifies its order on 22 August to allow for the release of dogs that had been sterilized and immunized.
  - Ten women are killed and 25 others are injured after a pick-up van falls off the road on a hilly terrain in Pune district, Maharashtra.
  - Five persons are killed and several others are injured after a jeep and a motorcycle collide in Anuppur district, Madhya Pradesh.
  - Three children from a family are killed after allegedly consuming toxic food in Patna.
- 12 August – Three people are killed and several others are injured after a sleeper bus collides with a motorcycle in Jalore district, Rajasthan.
- 13 August – Eleven people, including seven children, are killed when a pickup truck carrying devotees crashes into a parked trailer truck in Dausa, Rajasthan.
- 14 August –
  - 2025 Kishtwar district flash flood: At least 65 people are killed while more than 100 are injured and several are reported missing following a massive cloudburst in Chositi in Kishtwar district, Jammu and Kashmir.
  - The Supreme Court rejects the bail plea of Kannada actor Darshan for his role in the Renukaswamy murder case.
  - Four members of a family are killed and another woman is severely injured in a collision between an autorickshaw and a truck in Ranchi district, Jharkhand.
- 15 August –
  - Four persons suffocate to death in a septic tank in Garhwa district, Jharkhand.
  - A bus collides with a truck in Bardhaman, West Bengal, killing 10 people and injuring 35 others.
  - Three persons are killed, including two children and many others are injured in a blast caused by a gas leak at a house in Bengaluru.
  - Six people are killed and one other sustain serious injuries after a car collides head-on with a truck in Rajnandgaon district, Chhattisgarh.
- 16 August –
  - Seven people are killed and many others are injured after part of the wall and roof of Dargah Masjid Pattawali collapses in New Delhi.
  - A family of four and another person are killed in a building fire in Bengaluru, Karnataka.
  - Four members of a Gujarat-based music band are killed and eleven other persons are injured after a minibus collides with a small truck in Shivpuri, Madhya Pradesh.
  - Two passengers are killed and twelve others are injured after a (KSRTC) bus rams into a stationary lorry in Ballari, Karnataka.
- 17 August –
  - Seven persons are killed and many others are injured in two separate incidents of cloudburst and landslides in Kathua district, Jammu and Kashmir.
  - Eight persons, including five women and two children are killed after their car collides with an SUV and catches fire in Surendranagar, Gujarat.
- 18 August – Five devotees are fatally electrocuted and four others are injured when a Rath used as part of Sri Krishnashtami celebrations comes into contact with an electric wire in the Ramanthapur area of Hyderabad.
- 19 August – Three persons are killed after a bus collides with a light commercial vehicle (LCV) near Mand village in Kapurthala, Punjab.
- 20 August –
  - India successfully test-fires its intermediate-range ballistic missile (IRBM) Agni-V from the Integrated Test Range at Chandipur, Odisha.
  - China and India agree to resume direct flights suspended since 2020, reopen designated border trade points and boost investment in their economies following talks in New Delhi between Chinese foreign minister Wang Yi and Indian officials including Indian foreign minister S. Jaishankar and Prime Minister Narendra Modi.
  - Three workers are killed and some are reported missing after part of a building collapses near Sadbhavna park in Daryaganj, Delhi.
  - One Hundred and Thirtieth Amendment of the Constitution of India: A bill which proposes the removal of Prime Minister, Ministers, Chief Ministers arrested in serious criminal cases is introduced in the Lok Sabha by Home Minister Amit Shah.
  - Five members of a family, including two children, are fatally electrocuted after they come into contact with high-voltage wires laid in a field to protect crops from wild animals in Jalgaon district, Maharashtra.
- 21 August –
  - Five members of a family are found dead at their residence in a suspected suicide caused by financial difficulties in Makhtha, Mahaboobpet area of Hyderabad.
  - The monsoon session of the Parliament of India ends with a record breaking low productivity amid opposition protests on the Special Intensive Rolls Revision in Bihar.
  - Four workers are killed and two others are hospitalised after a nitrogen gas leak at a pharmaceutical company in Palghar district, Maharashtra.
- 22 August –
  - The Promotion and Regulation of Online Gaming Act, 2025, providing a comprehensive legal framework and regulations for online gaming in India, receives the President's assent, becoming a law.
  - Public interest litigation is filed in Supreme Court of India against compulsory roll out of E20 fuel.
- 24 August – Student protests in Ramlila Maidan over poor conduct of Staff Selection Commission exam.
- 25 August – India issues an official flood advisory to Pakistan, marking the first official contact between the two countries since the 2025 India–Pakistan conflict in May.
- 26 August – At least 30 people are killed in a landslide caused by heavy rains near the Vaishno Devi Temple in Katra, Jammu and Kashmir.
- 28 August – Seventeen people are killed in a building collapse in Palghar, Maharashtra.

=== September ===
- 2 September – 2025 Punjab, India floods: At least 30 people are reported killed following days of flooding caused by heavy rains in Punjab.
- 3 September – The Government of India announces GST reforms by reducing GST on many Indian goods amid Trump Tariffs.
- 9 September – 2025 Indian vice presidential election: C. P. Radhakrishnan is elected as the new Vice President of India.
- 9 September – 28 September: 2025 Asia Cup.
- 11 September – Ten Naxalites are killed during clashes with security forces in Gariaband district, Chhattisgarh.
- 12 September –
  - C. P. Radhakrishnan takes his oath of office as the 15th Vice President of India.
  - 2025 Hassan district truck accident: 10 people are killed and 22 others are injured, including the driver, when a speeding truck runs over people celebrating the Ganesh Chaturthi festival in Hassan district, Karnataka.
- 13 September – Prime Minister Narendra Modi visits Manipur for the first time since ethnic violence broke out in the state in May 2023.
- 14 September – A magnitude 5.8 earthquake hits Assam, injuring two people.
- 15 September – The Supreme Court suspends parts of The Waqf (Amendment) Act 2025, including a provision allowing the government to decide whether a disputed property is waqf or not.
- 16 September –
  - Fifteen people are killed and 16 others are injured in a landslide caused by flooding across Uttarakhand.
  - The Communist Party of India (Maoist) issues a statement announcing the suspension of armed activities and willingness to enter into peace negotiations.
- 19 September – Two Assam Rifles personnel are killed and five are injured in an ambush by People's Liberation Army of Manipur militants in Bishnupur district, Manipur.
- 22 September –
  - A 13-year old stowaway from Afghanistan is discovered on the landing gear compartment of a Kam Air flight that arrived at Indira Gandhi International Airport in Delhi from Kabul.
  - At least 10 people are killed following floods in Kolkata.
  - Senior Maoist commanders Kadari Satyanarayan Reddy and Katta Ramachandra Reddy are killed in clashes with government forces in Abujhmarh, Chhattisgarh.
- 24 September –
  - Three members of the Jharkhand Jan Mukti Parishad are killed in clashes with government forces.
  - Four people are killed following clashes in Leh between security forces and protesters demanding statehood for Ladakh.
- 26 September –
  - The Indian Air Force formally retires its fleet of MiG-21 fighter aircraft after 62 years in service.
  - Sonam Wangchuk is arrested under the National Security Act for inciting mob violence in demand of statehood for Ladakh.
- 27 September –
  - 2025 Karur crowd crush: At least 40 people are killed and 51 people are injured in a crowd crush at a rally held by actor-turned-politician Vijay's party Tamilaga Vettri Kazhagam (TVK) in Karur, Tamil Nadu.
  - The Cold Desert is designated as a biosphere reserve by UNESCO.
- 29 September – Canada designates the Lawrence Bishnoi Gang as a terrorist organisation on charges of waging terrorism and violence against Indian Canadians.
- 30 September – At least nine people are killed and one person is injured in an arch collapse of an under construction power plant in Tamil Nadu.

=== October ===
- 1 October – A fire breaks out at a warehouse belonging to Amar Chitra Katha in Bhiwandi, Maharashtra, destroying nearly 600,000 books and archival materials before being extinguished on 5 October.
- 5 October –
  - At least 24 people are reported killed in landslides in Darjeeling District, West Bengal.
  - At least six patients are killed in a fire at the intensive care unit of the Sawai Man Singh Hospital in Jaipur.
- 6 October – Chief Justice of India shoe-throwing incident: Chief Justice of India, B. R. Gavai is attacked by a shoe thrown by a lawyer named Rakesh Kishore over remarks about Vishnu.
- 8 October –
  - A bus is hit by a landslide in Bilaspur district, Himachal Pradesh, killing 15 people.
  - Navi Mumbai International Airport is inaugurated in a ceremony led by Prime Minister Modi.
- 9 October – India and Australia sign a bilateral security agreement allowing for the establishment of a forum for joint staff talks between their militaries and submarine rescue cooperation.
- 14 October – A bus catches fire in Jaisalmer, killing 20 people and injuring 15 others.
- 17 October – Three soldiers are injured in a grenade attack on an army camp by the United Liberation Front of Asom in Kakopathar, Assam.
- 24 October –
  - A bus catches fire after colliding with a motorcycle in the village of Chinnatekuru in Kurnool District, Andhra Pradesh, killing 25 people.
  - 2025 Rajya Sabha elections: Elections are held in four Rajya Sabha seats in Jammu and Kashmir, with the Jammu and Kashmir National Conference winning three seats and the BJP winning one seat.
- 27 October – Flights between China and India resume for the first time since 2020 following a suspension caused by the COVID-19 pandemic and the 2020–2021 China–India skirmishes.
- 30 October – Teacher Rohit Arya is killed in an encounter by the Mumbai police after holding 17 children hostage in Powai, Mumbai.
- 31 October – A court in Andhra Pradesh sentences five people to death for the assassination of the mayor of Chittoor and her husband in November 2015.

=== November ===
- 1 November –
  - At least nine people are killed in a stampede at the Venkateswara Temple in Srikakulam, Andhra Pradesh.
  - Kerala is declared the first state of India to eradicate extreme poverty.
- 2 November –
  - At least 15 people are killed and two people are injured when a tempo traveller crashes onto a parked truck in Jodhpur.
  - India wins the 2025 Women's Cricket World Cup. It is the team's first trophy in the Women's Cricket World Cup.
  - The Indian Space Research Organisation launches its heaviest communications satellite, the CMS-03, which weighs 4,410 kg (9,720 lb), from the Satish Dhawan Space Centre in Andhra Pradesh.
- 3 November –
  - At least 19 people are killed and 40 people are injured when a speeding dump truck collides with 17 vehicles in Jaipur.
  - At least 24 people are killed and 24 others are injured when a truck collides with an RTC bus near Chevella, Telangana.
- 4 November –
  - 2025 Chhattisgarh train collision: A passenger train collides with a cargo train near Bilaspur, Chhattisgarh, killing 11 people.
  - Four United Kuki National Army (UKNA) militants are killed in an encounter by security forces in Churachandpur, Manipur.
- 5 November –
  - At least six people are killed after being hit by a Kalka-Howrah Express train while crossing the railway track in Mirzapur, Uttar Pradesh.
  - Rahul Gandhi conducts a press conference titled H files and makes allegations about massive electoral fraud in the 2024 Haryana Legislative Assembly election.
- 6 November – Phase 1 of 2025 Bihar Legislative Assembly election.
- 7 November – At least two people are killed while three others are injured after being hit by a local train in Mumbai.
- 8 November – At least three people are killed and seven people are injured after a car collides with vehicles and a bus stop near Jaggampeta, Andhra Pradesh.
- 10 November – 2025 Delhi car explosion: 15 people are killed and more than 20 are injured in a car explosion near the Red Fort in Delhi.
- 11 November –
  - Phase 2 of 2025 Bihar Legislative Assembly election.
  - 2006 Noida serial murders: The Supreme Court acquits Surendra Koli of all remaining charges related to his serial murders in Noida, Uttar Pradesh, from 2005 to 2006, and orders his immediate release.
- 12 November – The SIT constituted by the Government of Karnataka makes its first arrest in the Vote Chori case of Aland Assembly constituency.
- 13 November – Eight people are killed and 20 others are injured along the Pune–Bengaluru Highway when two trucks collide and catch fire.
- 14 November –
  - 2025 Bihar Legislative Assembly election: The BJP-led NDA alliance wins a landslide victory in the Bihar Legislative Assembly.
  - A Pilatus PC-7 Mk2 of the Indian Air Force crashes during a routine training flight in Chennai. The pilot ejects safely.
- 15 November – Nine people are killed in an explosion at a police station in Nowgam, Jammu and Kashmir.
- 18 November – Naxalite commander Madvi Hidma, his wife, and four other rebels are killed in an encounter with security forces in Alluri Sitharama Raju district, Andhra Pradesh.
- 19 November – Around 70 million rupees ($800,000) are stolen in a daylight robbery on a bank van in Bengaluru.
- 22 November – Protests against air pollution in Delhi.
- 24–25 November – Ash clouds from the eruption of the Hayli Gubbi volcano in Ethiopia cause major disruptions to aviation in Indian airspace.
- 24 November – Six people are killed and 32 people are injured in a head-on collision of two private buses in Tenkasi, Tamil Nadu.
- 26 November – A nationwide protest is held by 10 trade unions against the introduction of new labour codes.
- 28 November – 10 December: 2025 Men's FIH Hockey Junior World Cup.
- 28 November – The Department of Telecommunications orders smartphone makers to pre-install Sanchar Saathi, a state-owned cybersecurity app, on new devices, as part of efforts against cybercrime.
- 30 November – Ten people are killed and 20 people are injured in a bus collision in Sivaganga, Tamil Nadu.

=== December ===
- 3 December – Communal tensions in Thiruparankundram over the lighting of Karthika Deepam.
- 5 December –
  - 2025 IndiGo disruption: IndiGo begins cancelling thousands of flights amid issues over its compliance with revised pilot rest and duty regulations by the government. Operations stabilise by 9 December.
  - Supriya Sule presents a Private member's bill titled Right to Disconnect Bill 2025, which plans to bring Work–life balance in the labour market.
- 6 December – A fire at a nightclub in Arpora, Goa, kills at least 25 people.
- 8 December –
  - A court in Ernakulam acquits actor Dileep on charges relating to the abduction and rape of an actress in 2017. Six others are convicted.
  - Targeted violence by Koya tribespeople against Bengalis in MV-26 settlement of Malkangiri following a murder of a woman in the previous week. The district administration imposes a curfew.
  - Manish Tewari presents a Private member's bill proposing an amendment to the Anti-defection law that allows MPs to choose an independent line in voting on bills and motions.
- 9 December – A 24-year boy named Anjel Chakma was beaten by mobs where he later succumbed to his injuries in Uttarakhand.
- 13 December – Rioting breaks out among fans at the Salt Lake Stadium in Kolkata following an appearance by Lionel Messi that was abruptly ended.
- 15 December – The Viksit Bharat Shiksha Adhishthan Bill, 2025 that aims to regulate the higher education framework in India by establishing a single apex institutional body is introduced in the Lok Sabha.
- 18 December –
  - Oman and India sign a comprehensive economic partnership agreement.
  - The Parliament of India passes the VB G RAM G bill replacing the MGNREGA bill amid opposition boycott.
- 20 December – The Rajdhani Express train hits a herd of Asiatic elephants in Assam, resulting in the deaths of seven of the animals and the derailing of five coaches and the engine.
- 21 December – The President of India gives assent to the VB G RAM G bill.
- 22 December — India and New Zealand confirm plans to sign a free trade agreement in 2026.
- 23 December —
  - Two people are killed and several others are injured in violent clashes in Karbi Anglong district, Assam.
  - The Delhi High Court grants bail to Kuldeep Singh Sengar the main accused in the 2017 Unnao rape case.
- 24 December — The Indian Space Research Organisation launches the heaviest payload it has carried, a US-built AST SpaceMobile communications satellite weighing 6,100 kg (13,400 lb).
- 25 December —
  - Eleven people are killed when a truck collides with a sleeper bus in Chitradurga, Karnataka.
  - Nine people are killed when a bus collides with two vehicles in Cuddalore, Tamil Nadu.
- 29 December —
  - The Supreme Court of India stays its earlier 20 November 2025 order on the Aravalli hills.
  - The Supreme Court of India stays the order of the Delhi High Court granting bail to Kuldeep Singh Sengar, the main accused in the 2017 Unnao rape case.
  - The central government imposes a two-month ban on the usage of VPNs in Jammu and Kashmir, citing security reasons.
- 30 December — Seven people are killed while 12 others are injured when a bus falls into a gorge in Almora, Uttarakhand.

== Deaths ==
=== January ===
- 1 January –
  - Pradeep Hemsingh Jadhav, 70, politician
  - K. S. Manilal, 86, botany scholar and taxonomist
  - Mukesh Chandrakar, 32, journalist
  - Kaak, 84, cartoonist.
- 2 January –
  - Govind Sharan Lohra, 69, folk singer, songwriter and dancer
  - S. Jayachandran Nair, 85, journalist
- 4 January – Rajagopala Chidambaram, 88, nuclear scientist
- 5 January – Na D'Souza, 87, novelist
- 6 January – Alok Chatterjee, 64, theatre actor and director
- 7 January –
  - Jiban Mukhopadhyay, 76, politician
  - Jagdish Mittal, 99, art collector
- 8 January –
  - Pritish Nandy, 73, filmmaker, journalist and poet
  - Gyanada Kakati, 92, actress
- 9 January –
  - Bimla Bissell, 92, civil servant and businesswoman
  - P. Jayachandran, 80, playback singer
- 11 January – Gurpreet Gogi, 57, politician
- 12 January – Manda Jagannath, 73, politician
- 13 January –
  - Abdul Sathar Kunju, 85, police officer
  - Palavalasa Rajasekharam, 80, politician
- 14 January – Surat Singh Khalsa, 91, Indian-American political activist
- 15 January –
  - Jafar Masood Hasani Nadwi, 59, Islamic scholar
  - Sudip Pandey, 30, actor and producer
  - Manjul Sinha, television director
  - P. R. Sundaram, 73, politician
  - Sarigama Viji, 76, actor
- 17 January –
  - M. Srinivas, 82, politician
  - K. N. Chandrasekharan Pillai, 81, legal scholar
- 18 January –
  - N. Kayisii, 58, politician
  - K. R. Punia, 89, politician
  - T. M. Jayamurugan, film director
- 19 January – K. K. Gangadharan, 75, translator
- 20 January – Shamsheer Singh Manhas, 65, politician
- 21 January – Kaajee Singh, 80, percussionist
- 22 January – Tabish Mehdi, 73, poet
- 23 January – Appunni Tharakan, 96, artist
- 25 January –
  - Tarun Bhartiya, 54, filmmaker, poet and social activist
  - K. M. Cherian, 82, heart surgeon
  - Harpal Brar, 85, politician
  - Latika Katt, 76, sculptor
- 26 January –
  - Shafi, 56, film director
  - Samarendra Narayan Dev, 84, filmmaker

=== February ===
- 1 February –
  - Navin Chawla, 79, civil servant
  - Kishan Kapoor, 73, politician
  - Zakia Jafri, 86, human rights activist
- 2 February – Nasiruddin Ahamed, 70-71, politician
- 3 February –
  - Victor Menezes, 77, banker
- 4 February –
  - Karshan Solanki, 68, politician
  - Pushpalatha, 87, actress
- 7 February – Kameshwar Choupal, 68, politician
- 8 February – Gyalo Thondup, 97, Tibetan exile, brother of the 14th Dalai Lama
- 10 February – Gurdev Singh, 77, sarod player
- 11 February – Raosaheb Rangnath Borade, 84, novelist
- 12 February – Prabhakar Karekar, 80, Hindustani classical singer
- 13 February –
  - Sukri Bommagowda, 88, folk singer
  - Tukaram Bidkar, 73, politician
- 15 February –
  - Pratul Mukhopadhyay, 82, singer and songwriter
  - Lavoo Mamledar, 68, politician
  - R. M. Vasagam, 81–82, space scientist
  - Vinod Kumar Gupta, 77, jurist
- 16 February – Krishnaveni, 100, actress
- 19 February –
  - Milind Rege, 76, cricketer
  - Shyam Singh Shashi, 89, socio-anthropologist
  - S. K. Kaul, 89, air force officer
- 20 February – Kejong Chang, 90, politician
- 22 February – Mayadhar Raut, 94, odissi dancer
- 25 February –
  - Vimala Rangachar, 96, educationist
  - Kala Nath Shastry, 88, linguist and Sanskrit scholar
- 26 February – Anil R. Joshi, 84, poet and essayist
- 27 February –
  - Uttam Mohanty, 66, actor
  - P. Raju, 73, politician

=== March ===
- 2 March –
  - Bruno Dias Souza, 99, architect
  - George P. Abraham, 74, urologist and nephrologist
- 3 March –
  - Padmakar Shivalkar, 84, cricketer
  - Sunil Satpal Sangwan, 77, politician
- 5 March – S.K. Bagga, 71, politician
- 8 March –
  - V. Ramaswami, 96, judge
  - Harbans Jandu, 71, lyricist
- 9 March – Garimella Balakrishna Prasad, 76, classical musician and singer
- 10 March – B. Subbayya Shetty, 91, politician
- 12 March – Syed Abid Ali, 83, cricketer
- 13 March –
  - K. K. Kochu, 76, writer and social activist
  - Lil Bahadur Chettri, 92, novelist
- 14 March –
  - Deb Mukherjee, 83, actor
  - Panchakshari Hiremath, 92, writer, critic and translator
- 16 March –
  - Ramakanta Rath, 90, modernist poet
  - Bindu Ghosh, 76, actress
  - Arvind Singh Mewar, 80, socialite and hotelier, chairman of HRH Group of Hotels
- 17 March –
  - Debendra Pradhan, 83, politician
  - Mankombu Gopalakrishnan, 77, lyricist
  - Pemmaraju Sreenivasa Rao, 83, legal expert.
- 20 March – A. T. Raghu, 75, film director
- 21 March –
  - Devendra Sharma, 66, politician
  - Rakesh Pandey, 77, actor
- 23 March – Krishna Lal Chadha, 88, horticultural scientist
- 25 March –
  - Shihan Hussaini, 60, actor and karateka
  - Manoj Bharathiraja, 48, actor and film director
  - Syed Ali Ashrafi, politician and islamic scholar
- 26 March – Karuppasamy Pandian, 76, politician
- 27 March – Harikrishna Pathak, 86, poet, short story writer, and editor
- 28 March – Eurico da Silva, 91, judge
- 30 March –
  - Tarun Agarwal, 69, jurist
  - Prem Parkash, 92, writer

=== April ===
- 4 April –
  - Manoj Kumar, 87, actor and film director
  - Ravikumar, 71, actor
- 6 April – Paschal Topno, 92, Roman Catholic prelate
- 7 April –
  - Raghbir Lal, 95, hockey player
  - Kishna Ram Nai, 90, politician
- 8 April – Ram Sahay Panday, 92, Rai folk dancer
- 9 April – Kumari Ananthan, 92, politician.
- 11 April – Abdur Razzak Molla, 80, politician
- 12 April –
  - Kumudini Lakhia, 94, Kathak dancer
  - Daripalli Ramaiah, 87, environmental activist
- 13 April –
  - Kalaipuli G. Sekaran, 73, film distributor, screenwriter and actor.
  - Bank Janardhan, 76, Kannada actor
- 15 April – S. S. Stanley, 57, film director
- 16 April – Jai Kishan, 66, politician
- 17 April – Rose Kerketta, 84, writer
- 18 April –
  - Mathew Kalarickal, 77, cardiologist
  - A. P. Balachandran, 87, theoretical physicist
- 20 April – Krishan Chandra Singhal, 83, pharmacologist
- 21 April – Tilakdhari Singh, 87, politician
- 25 April – Krishnaswamy Kasturirangan, 84, space scientist.
- 26 April – M. G. S. Narayanan, 92, historian.
- 28 April – Shaji N. Karun, 73, filmmaker.
- 29 April – Jyoti Prakash Tamang, 63, microbiologist.
- 30 April –
  - Ramdas Ambatkar, 64, politician
  - Sunny Thomas, 83, sport shooting coach
  - Ronald Sapa Tlau, 71, politician

=== May ===
- 1 May – Girija Vyas, 78, politician
- 3 May – Sivananda, yoga teacher and longevity claimant
- 4 May –
  - K. V. Rabiya, 59, social worker and literacy activist.
  - Ghulam Mohammad Vastanvi, 75, Islamic scholar, vice-chancellor of Darul Uloom Deoband (2011).
- 6 May – Sugavasi Palakondrayudu, 78, politician, MP (1984–1989) and Andhra Pradesh MLA (1978–1985, 1999–2009).
- 7 May – Madhav Vaze, 85, actor (Shyamch Aai, 3 Idiots)
- 8 May – B. Raji Reddy, 80, politician, Andhra Pradesh MLA (2009–2014).
- 10 May –
  - Subbanna Ayyappan, 69, aquaculture scientist (Blue Revolution)
  - Ramanand Prasad Singh, 83–84, politician, Bihar MLA (2004–2010, 2015–2020).
- 11 May – Hemaben Acharya, 91, politician
- 14 May –
  - Balachandra Rao, 80, astronomer and mathematician
  - Nandalike Balachandra Rao, 72, journalist and writer
- 15 May – Tapas Kumar Saha, 65, politician
- 17 May – Saroj Ghose, 89, museum founder
- 18 May – S. R. Nayak, 81, jurist
- 20 May –
  - Jayant Narlikar, 86, astrophysicist.
  - M. R. Srinivasan, 95, nuclear scientist
- 21 May – Nambala Keshava Rao, 69–70, Maoist rebel, general secretary of the Communist Party of India (Maoist) (since 2018).
- 22 May – Rattan Singh Jaggi, 97, scholar
- 23 May – Mukul Dev, 54, actor
- 26 May –
  - R. T. Deshmukh, politician
  - Ram Prakash Bambah, 99, mathematician
- 27 May – Banoth Madanlal, 62, politician
- 28 May –
  - Sunjoy Monga, 63, wildlife photographer
  - Sukhdev Singh Dhindsa, 89, politician
- 29 May –
  - Prasanna Pattnaik, 76, politician, Odisha MLA (1977–1980, 1985–1995).
  - Rajesh, 75, actor (Kanni Paruvathile, Achamillai Achamillai, Virumaandi).
- 30 May –
  - H. S. Venkateshamurthy, 80, screenwriter (Chinnari Mutha, Kraurya) and lyricist (Kotreshi Kanasu).
  - Abdul Ismail, 79, cricketer (Bombay).
- 31 May – Valmik Thapar, 73, naturalist

=== June ===
- 4 June – Sukur Ali Ahmed, 66, politician
- 6 June – Thennala Balakrishna Pillai, 95, politician
- 8 June – Maganti Gopinath, 62, politician
- 9 June –
  - Partho Ghosh, 76, film director
  - S. Gunasekaran, 58, politician
- 12 June –
  - Vijay Rupani, 68, MP (2006-2012), and chief minister of Gujarat (2016-2021)
  - Sunjay Kapur, 53, businessman
- 14 June – Kollangudi Karuppayee, 99, folk singer and actor
- 16 June –
  - Nellai S. Muthu, 74, writer and novelist
  - Mangala Bhatt, 62, Kathak dancer
  - Indira Billi, 88, actress
- 17 June – Sanjay Raj Subba, 65, politician
- 18 June – Maruti Chitampalli, 92, naturalist, wildlife conservationist, and writer
- 19 June –
  - Prafulla Roy, 91, screen writer
  - Vivek Lagoo, 71, stage actor
- 20 June –
  - Tushar Ghadigaonkar, 32, actor and director
  - Pooran Chand Joshi, 69, anthropologist and academic administrator
- 23 June –
  - Dilip Doshi, 77, cricketer
  - Mohan Singh Kohli, 93, naval officer and mountaineer
- 24 June – Mudundi Ramakrishna Raju, 95, nuclear physicist
- 26 June – Surendra Dubey, 71, poet
- 27 June –
  - Shefali Jariwala, 42, actress and reality show personality
  - B. D. Behring, 79, politician
  - Kashmir Singh Sohal, 62, politician
- 28 June – Saquib Nachan, convicted terrorist

=== July ===
- 2 July – Shekhar Dutt, 79, civil servant.
- 4 July – Munishwar Chandar Dawar, 79, physician.
- 5 July – Anand Singh, 87, politician.
- 7 July –
  - Siva Shakthi Datta, 92, film director and lyricist.
  - Aprem Mooken, 85, Chaldean Syrian prelate, metropolitan of the church (since 1968).
- 10 July – Chandra Shekhar Dubey, 87, politician.
- 12 July –
  - Gadul Singh Lama, 86, writer.
  - Ramamurti Rajaraman, 86, physicist.
- 13 July –
  - Kota Srinivasa Rao, 83, actor and politician.
  - K. B. Ganapathy, 85, journalist.
- 14 July –
  - B. Saroja Devi, 87, actress.
  - Fauja Singh, 114, marathon runner and longevity claimant.
- 15 July – Dheeraj Kumar, 79, actor and director.
- 16 July – C. V. Padmarajan, 93, politician.
- 18 July –
  - Fish Venkat, 53, actor and comedian.
  - Velu Prabhakaran, 68, actor and film director.
  - M. K. Muthu, 77, actor and politician.
- 20 July –
  - Chandra Barot, 86, film director.
  - Abu Hena, 75, politician.
- 21 July –
  - V. S. Achuthanandan, 101, Chief Minister of Kerala (2006–2011) and seven-time Kerala MLA.
  - Lalrintluanga Sailo, 65, politician.
- 23 July –
  - Ratan Thiyam, 77, playwright and theatre director.
  - Ajit Rai, 58, film and theatre critic and cultural journalist
- 24 July –
  - P. Namperumalsamy, 85, ophthalmologist.
  - Sulochana Gadgil, 81, meteorologist and climate scientist.
- 30 July – T. N. Manoharan, 69, chartered accountant, president of the ICAI (2006–2007) and chairman of Canara Bank (2015–2020).

=== August ===
- 1 August –
  - Vasanthi Devi, 86, academic administrator, vice-chancellor of Manonmaniam Sundaranar University (1992–1998).
  - Kalabhavan Navas, 51, actor (Hitler Brothers, Junior Mandrake, Mattupetti Machan) and comedian.
- 2 August –
  - M. K. Sanu, 98, writer and literary critic.
  - Madhan Bob, 71, actor (Magalir Mattum, Gopura Deepam, Ayya) and comedian.
- 4 August –
  - Shibu Soren, 81, former Minister of Coal and former Chief Minister of Jharkhand.
  - Shanawas, 71, actor (Aasha, Mylanji, Irattimadhuram).
- 5 August –
  - Satya Pal Malik, 79, former Governor of Jammu & Kashmir.
  - Santhosh Balaraj, 34, actor (Kempa, Ganapa, Kariya 2).
- 6 August – Rajat Kanta Ray, 79, historian.
- 11 August –
  - Hemanta Dutta, 83, dramatist and lyricist.
  - Nazima, 77, actress (Arzoo, Be-Imaan, Honeymoon).
- 14 August –
  - Vece Paes, 80, field hockey player, Olympic bronze medallist (1972).
  - Njattyela Sreedharan, 86, lexicographer.
- 15 August –
  - La. Ganesan, 80, former Governor of Nagaland.
  - Ramdas Soren, 62, politician, Jharkhand MLA (2009–2014, since 2019).
- 16 August – Jyoti Chandekar, 68, actress (Dholki, Shyamchi Aai, Tharala Tar Mag!).
- 18 August –
  - Achyut Potdar, 90, actor (Dabangg 2, Ferrari Ki Sawaari, 3 Idiots).
  - Gilbert Mendonca, 72, politician, Maharashtra MLA (2009–2014).
  - Nissar, 65, film director (Sudhinam, Three Men Army, Captain).
- 20 August –
  - Sona Ram Choudhary, 80, politician, MP (1996–2004, 2014–2019) and Rajasthan MLA (2008–2013).
  - Dinesh Chandra Dakua, 95, politician, West Bengal MLA (1967–1969, 1977–2006).
- 21 August – Vazhoor Soman, 72, politician, Kerala MLA (since 2021).
- 22 August –
  - Jaswinder Bhalla, 65, actor (Jatt & Juliet, Carry On Jatta, Mahaul Theek Hai) and comedian.
  - Suravaram Sudhakar Reddy, 83, politician, MP (1998–1999, 2004–2009).
  - Kali Prasad Pandey, 78, politician, MP (1984–1989).
- 26 August –
  - Dinesh Mangaluru, 55, actor (Smile, Ambari, Savari) and art director.
  - Joy Banerjee, 62, actor (Nagmoti) and politician.
- 28 August – Bal Karve, 95, actor (Lapandav, Chatak Chandni).
- 29 August – Eric Ozario, 76, Konkani music composer.
- 31 August – Priya Marathe, 38, actress (Pavitra Rishta, Ya Sukhano Ya, Tuzech Mi Geet Gaat Aahe).

=== September ===
- 8 September –
  - Dina Nath Bhagat, 79, politician Jammu and Kashmir MLA (since 2014).
  - Rajendra Dholakia, 68, politician Odisha MLA (2004–2014, since 2019).
  - Sankarshan Thakur, 63, journalist, editor of The Telegraph (since 2023).
- 11 September – P. P. Thankachan, 86, politician, member (1982–2001) and speaker (1991–1995) of the Kerala Legislative Assembly.
- 12 September – D. D. Lapang, 91, politician, four-time chief minister of Meghalaya.
- 14 September – Sarada Hoffman, 96, dancer and choreographer.
- 16 September – Shivram Bhoje, 83, nuclear scientist.
- 17 September –
  - Abdul Gani Bhat, 90, poet and political activist, co-founder of MUF.
  - Jacob Thoomkuzhy, 94, Syro-Malabar Catholic hierarch, bishop of Mananthavady (1973–1995), Thamarassery (1995–1996) and archbishop of Trichur (1996–2007).
  - Gajanan Mehendale, 77, historian.
- 18 September –
  - Robo Shankar, 46, comedian and actor (Maari, Velainu Vandhutta Vellaikaaran, Mannar Vagaiyara).
  - Anita Borges, 78, pathologist, heart attack.
  - Akella Venkata Suryanarayana, 75, screenwriter and playwright.
- 19 September –
  - Zubeen Garg, 52, singer-songwriter and actor (Tumi Mor Matho Mor, Mon Jaai, Rodor Sithi).
  - Hema Sane, 85, botanist.
- 22 September –
  - Bijay Kumar Satpathy, 73, weightlifter.
  - Edwin Colaço, 87, Roman Catholic prelate, bishop of Amravati (1995–2006) and Aurangabad (2006–2015).
  - Kosa, Maoist politician and rebel leader.
- 24 September –
  - S. L. Bhyrappa, 94, novelist (Bheemakaaya, Dharmashree, Matadana).
  - Beela Venkateshan, 56, civil servant.
- 26 September – Nand Lal Meena, 79, politician, MP (1989–1991) and Rajasthan MLA (1998–2013).
- 28 September – Bhaskar Chandanshiv, 80, author.
- 29 September – Yashwant Sardeshpande, 62, filmmaker.
- 30 September – Vijay Kumar Malhotra, 93, politician, MP (1989–2008) and Delhi MLA (2008–2013).

=== October ===
- 1 October – Ramreddy Damodar Reddy, 73, politician, Andhra Pradesh MLA (1985–1999, 2004–2014).
- 2 October –
  - Giriraj Prasad Tiwari, 104, politician, speaker of the Rajasthan Legislative Assembly (1986–1990).
  - Chhannulal Mishra, 89, Hindustani classical singer.
- 3 October –
  - T. J. S. George, 97, biographer.
  - Rameshwar Lal Dudi, 62, politician, MP (1999–2004) and Rajasthan MLA (2013–2018).
- 4 October – Sandhya Shantaram, 93, actress (Jhanak Jhanak Payal Baaje, Do Aankhen Barah Haath, Amar Bhoopali).
- 8 October – Rajvir Jawanda, 35, actor and singer.
- 15 October – Pankaj Dheer, 68, actor.
- 20 October –
  - Asrani, 84, actor and director.
  - Mahadeo Shivankar, 85, politician, MP (1989-1991, 2004-2009) and twice Maharashtra MLA.
- 21 October –
  - Rajivdada Deshmukh, politician, Maharashtra MLA (2009-2014), heart attack.
  - Yogendra Makwana, 91, politician, MP (1973-1988).
- 22 October – Eknath Vasant Chitnis, 100, space scientist.
- 23 October –
  - Piyush Pandey, 70, advertising professional and businessman.
  - K. Ponnusamy, 74, Tamil Nadu MLA (2006–2011, since 2021).
- 25 October – Satish Shah, 74, actor and comedian.
- 31 October – Ramdarash Mishra, 101, poet and writer.

=== November ===
- 4 November – Gopichand Hinduja, 85, conglomerate industry executive, chairman of Hinduja Group (since 1971).
- 7 November – Sulakshana Pandit, 71, actress (Sankalp, Sankoch, Waqt Ki Deewar) and playback singer.
- 10 November – Ande Sri, 64, poet and lyricist.
- 11 November – Imkong L. Imchen, 75, Nagaland MLA (since 2003).
- 14 November –
  - Saalumarada Thimmakka, 114, environmentalist.
  - Kamini Kaushal, 98, actress (Neecha Nagar, Biraj Bahu, Kabir Singh).
- 18 November – Madvi Hidma, 44, Naxalite, commander of Communist Party of India (Maoist).
- 20 November – Sudhakar Singh, 67, Uttar Pradesh MLA (since 2023).
- 24 November – Dharmendra, 89, actor (Ayee Milan Ki Bela, Mera Gaon Mera Desh, Life in a... Metro) and MP (2004-2009).
- 28 November – Sriprakash Jaiswal, 81, MP (1999-2014), Minister of Coal (2011-2014) and Home Affairs (2004-2009).
- 29 November – Kanathil Jameela, 59, Kerala MLA (since 2021).
- 30 November – M. S. Umesh, 80, actor (Pillalu Techina Challani Rajyam, Katha Sangama, Shruthi Seridaaga) and comedian/

=== December ===
- 1 December – R. V. Devraj, 67, politician, Karnataka MLA (2004-2008) and chairman of the KSRTC (2000-2007).
- 4 December – Swaraj Kaushal, 73, lawyer and politician, MP (1998-2004) and Governor of Mizoram (1990-1993).
- 8 December – Baba Adhav, 95, social and labor activist and author.
- 12 December – Shivraj Patil, 90, politician, MP (1980-2010), Speaker of the Lok Sabha (1991-1996) and Minister of Home Affairs (2004-2008).
- 14 December – Shamanuru Shivashankarappa, 84, politician, MP (1998–1999) and Karnataka MLA (since 2004).
- 18 December – Ram V. Sutar, 100, sculptor (Statue of Unity).
- 20 December – Sreenivasan, 69, actor, director (Vadakkunokkiyantram, Chinthavishtayaya Shyamala) and screenwriter (Odaruthammava Aalariyam).
- 23 December – Vinod Kumar Shukla, 88, writer.
- 26 December – Biswa Bandhu Sen, 72, politician, MLA (since 2008), deputy speaker (2018-2023), speaker of Tripura Legislative Assembly (since 2023), brain hemorrhage.
- 28 December – S. Krishnaswamy, 87, documentarist, heart disease.
- 30 December – K. K. Narayanan, 77, politician, MLA of Kerala Legislative Assembly (2011-2016).
