= 2025 Hassan district truck accident =

Vehicle collision in Karnataka, India

- Date: 12 September 2025
- Time: c. 8:00 p.m. (IST)
- Venue: Mosale Hosahalli
- Location: Hassan district, Karnataka, India; 12°53′46.9″N 76°09′39.2″E
- Type: Traffic collision
- Cause: Under investigation
- Deaths: 10
- Injuries: 22 (including the driver)

On 12 September 2025, a truck drove into people celebrating the Hindu festival of Ganesh Chaturthi in Mosale Hosahalli village, Hassan district, Karnataka, India. It resulted in the deaths of ten people and injuries to 22 others, including the driver. The cause of the accident is under investigation.

== Background ==
Ganesh Chaturthi is a Hindu festival celebrating the birthday of Ganesha, a Hindu deity. The festival is marked by the installation of large idols of the god, which is later carried in a public procession, and immersed in a body of water. Earlier, a militant group had warned of attacks being planned during the festival, which resulted in security being tightened.

== Accident ==
At about 8:00 pm IST, a speeding truck drove into a crowd of people at Mosale Hosahalli village in Hassan district. The truck reportedly traveling from Arkalgud towards Holenarasipura on the National Highway 373, lost control, hit a two-wheeler, and jumped over a median before driving into a crowd of people at a Ganesh Chaturthi immersion procession.

== Aftermath ==
At least ten people were killed and 22 others were injured including the driver with at least eight critically. The truck reportedly ploughed into the crowd while trying to avoid hitting a biker, and the biker was amongst the dead. At least four people were pronounced dead at the scene and the injured were transported to the Rajiv Gandhi University of Health Sciences in Bengaluru and other private hospitals in the district. The victims were aged between 17 and 27 years, and included seven villagers and three engineering students from the Government Engineering College in Hassan. Postmortems of nine of the victims were completed by 3 am the next day, and the bodies were handed over to their families.

The driver of the truck was identified as Bhuvenesh from Katte Belaguli in Holenarasipura, and was charged with reckless driving. The driver, who was assaulted by the locals after the accident, was initially admitted to the intensive care unit at the local hospital before being shifted to Bengaluru for further treatment on 14 September. A police official said that investigations were being conducted into the cause of the crash. Social media reports claimed the driver of the truck as a Muslim and the incident was an Islamic terrorist attack, which was later debunked by the government.

== Reactions ==
Indian prime minister Narendra Modi expressed his condolences and announced a relief of ₹0.2 million (US$2,100) for the families of the dead from the Prime minister's relief fund. Karnataka chief minister Siddaramaiah expressed his condolences and announced a compensation of ₹0.5 million (US$5,200) to the families of the deceased. He also said that the state government would bear the medical expenses for the treatment of those injured in the incident. Union minister H. D. Kumaraswamy expressed his shock on the accident. Other politicians, and government officials from Karnataka also expressed their grief on the accident, with the opposition blaming the government for inadequate security measures.

== See also ==
- Traffic collisions in India
