= Ajit Rai =

Indian critic (1967–2025)

- Born: 1 October 1967; Buxar, Bihar, India
- Died: 23 July 2025 (aged 57)
- Occupations: Indian film and theatre critic, cultural journalist

Ajit Rai (1 October 1967 – 23 July 2025) was an Indian film and theatre critic and cultural journalist. He was associated with Jansatta and The Indian Express.

== Early life ==
Rai was born in Kasian village in Buxar district of Bihar, on 1 October 1967.

== Work ==
Rai served as the editor of Rang Prasang, journal of National School of Drama, Ministry of Culture Government of India, New Delhi. Over the years he covered various International Film Festivals, including Cannes International Film Festival, El Gouna Film Festival, and Cairo International Film Festival.

He was the director of Raipur Film Festival, Azamgarh Film Festival and Haryana International Film Festival. Rai was also the member of International Farmer Film Festival and festival coordinator of the Media International Film Festival, and a member of the selection committee for the Meta Awards.

== Death ==
Rai died on 23 July 2025, at the age of 57.
