= Panchakshari Hiremath =

Indian writer and translator (1933–2025)

- Born: 6 January 1933; Bisarahalli, Kingdom of Mysore, India
- Died: 14 March 2025 (aged 92); Dharwad, Karnataka, India

Panchakshari Hiremath (6 January 1933 – 14 March 2025) was an Indian writer and poet, short story writer, essayist, critic, translator, orator, editor and freedom fighter who wrote in Kannada, Urdu and Hindi. In 2005, he won the Sahitya Akademi Prize for Translation.

== Background ==
Hiremath was born at Bisarahalli (now in Koppal District in Karnataka), British India. He was involved in the freedom struggle of Hyderabad Karnataka. He worked as a professor at Karnataka University and Karnatak College, Dharwad. His first collection of poems appeared in 1959.

Hiremath was most famous as a poet. He was an opponent of the division of Indian society on the basis of language. Hiremath opposed dividing the society on the basis of language. Some of Hiremath's own works have been translated into Hindi, Urdu, Malayalam, Tamil, Marathi, Nepali, English, Spanish, French and German.

Hiremath died on 14 March 2025, at the age of 92.

== Awards and honours ==
- 2013 Shri ChennaRenuka Basava Prashasti, Harkud Math, Basavakalyan, gold medal and cash award
- 2010 'Goenka Hindi Sahitya Sarswata Sammana' Awarded by Kamala Goenka Foundation, Bangalore
- 2005, Dr. Hiremath won the Kendra Sahitya Akademi Award for translating Qurratulain Hyder Urdu short stories Patjhar Ki Awaz to Kannada. The translated collection was titled Hemantha Ruthuvina Swaragalu.
- During Nehru Centenary, Soviet Union awarded "Soviet Land Nehru Award"
- 1994 Karnataka Sahitya Academy Honorary Award
- 1997 Rajyotsava Award, Government of Karnataka
- 1985 D.Litt. World University, Arizona. USA
- 2003, Hiremath won The Gorur Foundation Trust's award for Poetry.

== Published works ==
Poetry

- Chaityakshi
- Nee Rudranagu
- Bayake Ee Manake (Prescribed as textbook by Dakshina Bharat Hindi Prachara Sabha, Chennai)
- Mitra Deshada Kavithegalu (Russian poems; received Soviet Land Nehru Award)
- Gaali Gandha
- Belakina Heppu Hakuva Tavaka
- Indhradhanussu (translation from Hindi)
- Manasi (Forty five poems of Rabindranath Tagore)
- Bayala Baninalli (translation from Hindi)(Awarded Moorusavirmath Literary Award)
- Ondu Mattu Ondu, Eradu (translation from Hindi)
- Aashe Tumbida Usirugalu (translation from Hindi)
- Bhooma (translation from Hindi)
- Aarambhava Maduve (Awarded Gorur Literary Award)
- Samagra Kavye – Volume 1
- Samagra Kavye – Volume 2 (500 poems translated from different languages)
- Keladi (Samagra Kavya – Volume 3) (5005 Muktakas)

Stories

- Ennaleka (Prescribes as textbook by Karnataka University, Dharward)
- Hematha Rutuvina Swaragalu (translation from Urdu. Kendra Sahitya Akademi Award 2005)
- Quratul Ein Hyder Avara Aida Kathegalu
- Kshitij
- Krishna Chandara Kathegalu
- Hennondu Madhupatre (Ten stories of Amrita Preetam)
- Ippattelu Urdu Kathegalu
- Kashmirada Hovu (translation from Urdu)
- Gulabi Hoovu (translation from Urdu)
- Desha – Videshada Kathegalu (stories from different nations and languages)

Novels

- Kappu Hottage (translation from Gujarati)
- Aaru Adi Bhoomi (Kannada translation of Abdus Samad's Urdu novel Do Gaz Zameen), included in The Hindu's Top 10 Books of the Week
- Magga Chellida Belaku (translation from Hindi)
- Nari (Kannada translation of Siyaram Sharan Gupta's Hindi novel)
- Kattaleyondige (translation from Hindi)
- Jaragavada Rani (translation from Urdu)
- Ivan- e- Ghazal (translation from Urdu)
- Borban Club (translation from Urdu)

Criticism/Essays

- Kavi – Kavya – Darshana
- Kavi – Kavya – Kalpane
- Kavi – Kavya – Chintana
- Kavi – Kavya – Vihara
- Kavindra Ravindraru
- Kasmirada Mahayogini Lalleswari
- Hadinaru Prabandhagalu
- Cheluvina Alegalu
- Urdu Sahitya-Ondu Parichaya
- Galib (translation from Urdu)
- Bhoodana
- Gnana Peetha Prasasti Vijeta Firaq Gorkhapuri
- R C Bhoosnurmath (Kavi, Kavya parichaya)

Chintana Sahitya

- Chintana – Chirantana
- Chintana – Deepti
- Manasa – 1 (translation from Hindi, Rajasthan Patrika, Jaipur)
- Manasa – 2 (translation from Hindi, Rajasthan Patrika, Jaipur)
- Manasa – 3 (translation from Hindi, Rajasthan Patrika, Jaipur)

Biography

- Hanagal Kumara Swamigalu
- Sri Vijaya Mahanta Shivayogigalu
- Punya Chittaru
- Linga Leela Lolaru
- Ghanamadavaru

History

- Mukti Kshetra Ulavi
- Puratana Lucknow (translation from Urdu, awarded Moorusavirmath Literary Award)

Religion and Philosophy

- Veershaiva Pradeep

Travelogue

- Bharata Darshana

Literary Letters

- Ee Baduku Bangara
- Enentha Madhuravee Baduku
- Atma Sakhi, Tumbu Hrudaya Battalanu

Children's literature

- Chocolate Mattu Itara Kathegalu
- Neeti Kathegalu
- Darodegarana Maga (translation from Hindi)
- Bharatada Arasaru Mattu Sri Samanyaara Kathegalu (translation from English)
- Eidaga (translation from Urdu)
- Surakhabada Garigalu
- Makkala Kathegalu

Dramas (Translations)

- Hattu Hindi Laghu Natakagalu
- Panchali Shapatha Mattu Itara Natakagalu (translation from Tamil and Malayalam)
- Mooru Panjabi Natakagalu
- Chitrangada Mattu Itara Natakgalu (translation of radio plays from Oriya, Hindia Bengali)
- Neeru Taruva Hadi Mattu Itara Natakagalu (translation from Urdu, Bengali)
- Anuvadita Kathegalu (collection of translated dramas)

Hindi

- Manjari (Poems, Features, Stories and Articles)

English

- Yuga Purusha, translation by Vijayalakshmi Wodeyar
- Swami Vijaya Mahantesh, translation by Dr. Basavaraj Naiker
- Ulavi- The Abode of salvation, translation by Prof.C.N Hiremath
- Waves of Love, translation by Dr. C.V. Venugopal
- Sing the Song of Life, translation by Dr. C.V. Venugopal

Edited

- Mani Mukura Prabhe
- Gavi Deepti (With others)
- Shivayoga
- Shivalinga Deepti
- Shiva Deva (with others)
- Padmashri (with others)
- Abhinava Renuka
- Gurukarunya
- Vibhuti
- Bhaveyavara Bhoodan
- Sarangadeva
