= Mukesh Chandrakar =

Indian journalist (1991–2025)

- Born: 4 July 1991; Bijapur district, Chhattisgarh, India
- Died: c. 1 January 2025 (aged 33); Bijapur district, Chhattisgarh, India
- Occupation: Investigative journalist
- Known for: Investigative journalism
- Relatives: Yukesh Chandrakar (elder brother)

Mukesh Chandrakar (4 July 1991 – c. 1 January 2025) was an Indian journalist from the state of Chhattisgarh. He was murdered after doing an investigative report that exposed irregularities in a road development project.

== Early life ==
Mukesh Chandrakar was born in Basaguda in Bijapur district, Chhattisgarh. His father Chenna Chandrakar died when Mukesh was just 1 year old and his mother Kaushalya Chandrakar, was an anganwadi worker. His family was displaced by the naxal violence and moved to a government shelter in Bijapur. After his father died, he and his elder brother Yukesh were brought up by their mother. In 2013, she died of cancer. Mukesh completed his school education from Dantewada. Yukesh worked as a freelance journalist which inspired him to take up the role himself.

== Career as journalist ==
During his career, Chandrakar worked for several news channels like Sahara Samay, Nework18 Group and NDTV. He also had a YouTube channel called Bastar Junction. In 2021, Mukesh was among a group of seven journalists who helped security forces negotiate with Maoists to release a CoBRA gendarme captured in Tekalguda.

== Murder and investigation ==
Mukesh did a report that came out in NDTV on 25 December 2024 highlighting the poor condition of a road in Bijapur, after which the government initiated an inquiry. The contractor for this road was Mukesh’s cousin Suresh Chandrakar. Mukesh was last seen on the evening of 1 January. His elder brother Yukesh filed a missing person report with the police the following day. Based on mobile tracking, police located Mukesh’s body inside a septic tank on the property of contractor Suresh Chandrakar in Chattanpara Basti on 3 January under mysterious circumstances in Bastar district. According to a post-mortem report, Chandrakar was attacked with a heavy object and suffered severe injuries to his head, chest, back, and stomach. His body was identified through a tattoo on his hand.

The state government formed an 11-member Special Investigation Team (SIT), led by Mayank Gurjar, an IPS officer.

Three persons, including two of Chandrakar's relatives, have been arrested in the case. While his cousin, Ritesh Chandrakar, was arrested from Raipur airport, Mahendra Ramteke, a supervisor, and Dinesh Chandrakar, another relative of the victim, were taken into custody from Bijapur.

== Aftermath ==
The Press Association and the Editors Guild of India condemned the incident and urged the Chhattisgarh government to take steps to protect journalists, particularly those involved in field reporting and investigative journalism.

Editors Guild released a letter stating it was a matter of grave concern. "The young journalist's death is a matter of grave concern as it raises suspicion of foul play," the letter read.

Deputy Chief Minister Vijay Sharma, also the state’s home minister, alleged that the main accused, Suresh Chandrakar, is affiliated with the Indian National Congress and questioned the party's links to recent criminal cases. Congress, however, countered with claims that Suresh was inducted into the Bharatiya Janata Party recently, and demanded that Sharma release the CCTV footage from Chandrakar's visit to Sharma's CM residence days before the murder.

Chhattisgarh CM Vishnu Deo Sai announced ₹10 lakh aid to the murdered journalist's family on January 14, 2025.

On March 18, 2025, A charge sheet was filed against four accused, including a construction contractor, in journalist Mukesh Chandrakar’s murder case in a court in Chhattisgarh’s Bijapur district. The charge sheet named contractor Suresh Chandrakar, Ritesh Chandrakar, Dinesh Chandrakar, and Mahendra Ramteke. The accused are charged under sections 103 (murder), 238 (Causing disappearance of evidence of offence, or giving false information to screen offender), 61 (criminal conspiracy), 250 (Taking gift, etc., to screen an offender from punishment) of the Bharatiya Nyaya Sanhita (BNS).

== See also ==
- Corruption in India
- Freedom of the press in India
- List of journalists killed in India
