= Eric Ozario =

Indian Konkani music composer (1949–2025)

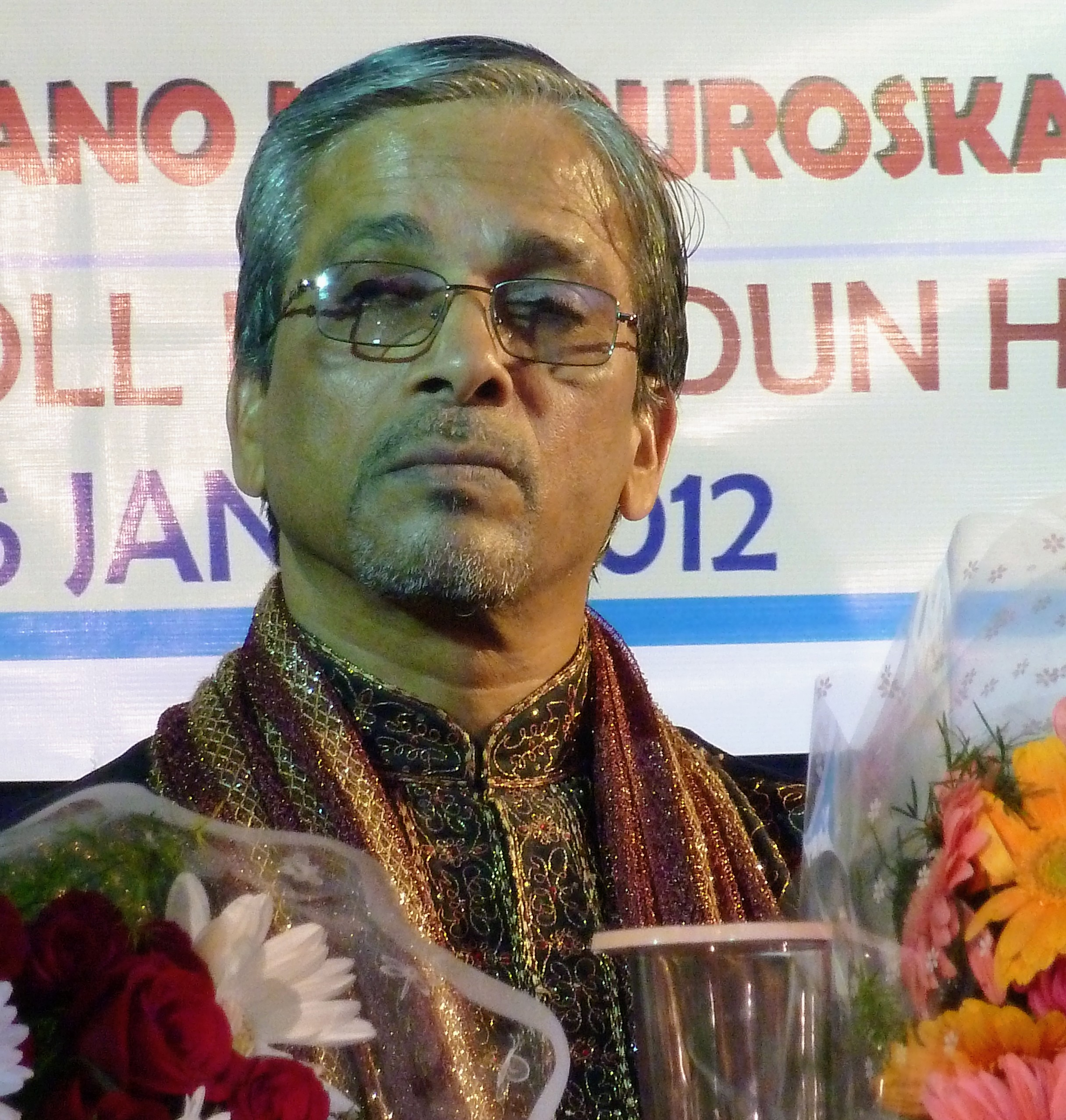
- Ozario in 2012
- Born: Eric Alexander Ozario; 18 May 1949
- Died: 29 August 2025 (aged 76); Mangaluru, Karnataka, India

Eric Alexander Ozario (18 May 1949 – 29 August 2025) was an Indian Konkani music composer, cultural activist, trade unionist and the founder of Mandd Sobhann, a leading Konkani cultural organization. He also founded Kalaangann, a Konkani heritage centre. Ozario was instrumental in Konkani being approved as an optional language in school education in the state of Karnataka. He had also been the secretary general of the Jagotik Konknni Songhotton (JKS – Global Konkani Organisation) for many years.

== Early life ==
Ozario was born in 1949 in Mangalore. He developed an early interest in Konkani music and cultural identity, which later influenced his life’s work. His legacy as a composer and cultural activist began with the foundation of Mandd Sobhann, through which he promoted Konkani music locally and internationally.

== Career ==
In 2009, Ozario participated in a movement to protest a plan to cut trees in Mangalore. Ozario's biography, The Indefatigable Crusader was released in 2014.

== Death ==
Ozario died from kidney disease on 29 August 2025, at the age of 76, in Mangaluru.

== Awards ==
- In 1994 Ozario was bestowed the title 'Konkani Kala Samrat'.
- Konkani Ratna
- 1993 State Rajyotsava Prashasti
- 1999 Karnataka Konkani Sahitya Academy Award.
- Aug 2017 Konkanis in Tel Aviv honoured Eric Ozario at the Independence Day Celebrations.
- Feb 2022 Eric Ozario conferred with Lifetime Achievement Award by Daiji World Dubai
- Feb 2023 Ozario was conferred a lifetime achievement award by Konkani Natak Sabha® (KNS) in Don Bosco Hall, Mangalore. 2023.
