= Sudip Pandey =

Indian actor (died 2025)

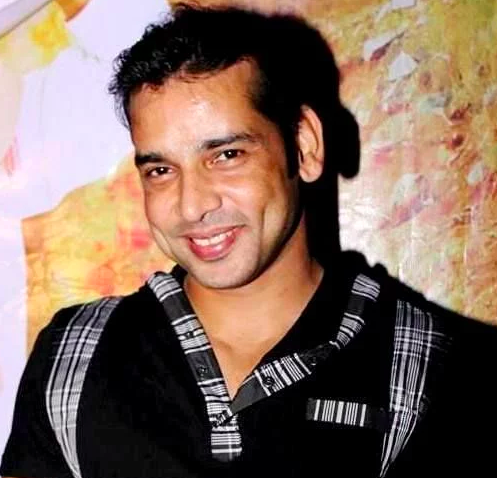
- Pandey in 2019
- Born: Tekari, Gaya district, Bihar, India
- Died: 15 January 2025; Mumbai, Maharashtra, India
- Occupations: Actor, producer, politician
- Years active: 2007–2025
- Known for: Contribution to Bhojpuri cinema and Bihar tourism
- Political party: Nationalist Congress Party

Sudip Pandey (died 15 January 2025) was an Indian actor, producer, and politician primarily known for his contributions to Bhojpuri cinema and Bihar tourism.

Pandey debuted in 2007 with the film Bhojpuriya Bhaiya, which he also produced, and subsequently starred in several films and TV shows.

== Life ==
Sudip Pandey was born and raised in Tekari, Gaya district, Bihar. His father, Upendra Pandey was a professor at SND College in Tekari, and his younger brother, Bihari Pandey is a teacher.

He obtained an engineering degree and worked as a software engineer in various firms in India and the United States for four years before transitioning to acting.

Pandey died from a heart attack in Mumbai, on 15 January 2025. He was in his 30s.

== Acting career ==
Pandey made his acting debut in 2007 with the film Bhojpuriya Bhaiya, which he also produced. Following this, he starred in more than forty Bhojpuri language films, including:

- Bhojpuriya Bhaiya (2007)
- Bhojpuriya Daroga (2008)
- Masiha Babu (2009)
- Sautan (2010)
- Hamar Sangi Bajrangbali (2010)
- Nathuniya Pe Goli Mare (2010)
- Hum Hai Dharamyodha (2011)
- Hamar Lalkar (2011)
- Sharabi (2012)
- Kurbani (2013)
- Khuni Dangal (2014)
- Dharti Ke Beta (2014)
- Brijwa (2015)
- Jai Ho Jagdamba Mai (2015)
- Bagawat (2016)
- Bahinia (2017)
- Bagawat (2018)
- Jeena Sirf Tere Liye (2018)
- V For Victor (2019)

In addition to his film career, Pandey was active in television, hosting and acting in various serials such as Saat Vachan Saat Phere, Khandaan, Bihar Ek Khoj, Police Files, and Kahin Ka Haal Ba. He also served as the brand ambassador for Bihar tourism, promoting the state's cultural heritage through the initiative "Bihar Ek Khoj."

One of his last projects was a home production film titled V For Victor, where he played the title role. He was also working on a sequel to Paro Patna Wali at the time of his death.

== Political career ==
Pandey was vocal about the demand for a CBI probe in the case of the Death of Sushant Singh Rajput.

On 10 September 2020, he joined Indian National Congress Party in Patna's Sadaqat Ashram in the presence of Madan Mohan Jha, Salman Khurshid, and Akhilesh Prasad Singh and Shaktisinh Gohil but resigned later.

On 14 October 2020, Pandey joined Nationalist Congress Party in the presence of Praful Patel and Jayant Patil at the party’s headquarters in Mumbai.

He was appointed as NCP’s star campaigner in 2020 Bihar Legislative Assembly election.

== Awards and recognition ==
- Best Newcomer at the 3rd Bhojpuri Film Awards (2007, Mumbai)
- Pragya Vibhushan Award (2011, Patna)
- RK HIV/AIDS Research and Care Centre Awards (2012, 2013, Delhi/Mumbai)
- Abhimanyu Award at the Bhojpuri Samman Samaroh (2009, Banaras)
