= Government Engineering College, Hassan =

Engineering college in Hassan, Karnataka, India

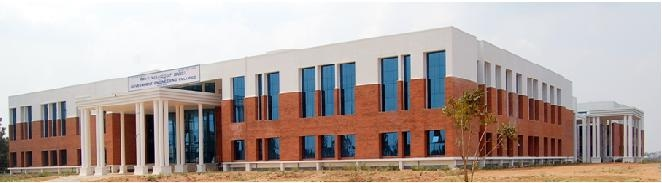
- Other names: GECH
- Motto: To Reach The Unreached
- Type: Government Engineering College
- Established: 2007
- Affiliations: VTU
- Principal: Dr. Girish D P
- Students: 1057
- Location: Hassan, Karnataka, 573201, India; 13°00′38″N 76°07′14″E
- Campus: Urban
- Website: gechassan.ac.in

Government Engineering College, Hassan (GECH) is an engineering college located in Hassan, Karnataka, India. A huge building with planned utilities has come up in forty acres land. The Government of Karnataka started this Government Engineering College with an objective – To Reach The Unreached. The institution is affiliated with the Visvesvaraya Technological University in Belgaum and approved by AICTE, New Delhi.

== History ==
The Government of Karnataka under Department of Technical Education has established 10 engineering colleges in 2007–2008. GEC Hassan is one such college established with four branches of engineering, namely, Civil Engineering, Computer Science & Engineering, Electronics & Communication Engineering, and Mechanical Engineering.

== Facilities ==
=== Library ===
The college library acts as a knowledge center for students and faculty of the college. The collection consists of documents in engineering subjects. The library collection today stands at 2 books. Karnataka Examination Authority announced to provide necessary initial books grant to expand library's collection. Social Welfare Department, Govt. of Karnataka also assisting in building SC/ST Book Bank in the library. From recent past, the collection has also been enriching by donations of valuable books from students & faculty.

=== Lab facilities ===
The Computer Science and Engineering department has state of the art network of computers to cater the needs of students. There are two computer labs with total of around 50 Standalone machines and 2 Servers. Most of the lab courses are done using FOSS to enhance students knowledge for practical works as access to source code is access to knowledge. The libre software give full freedom to students to make full use of it.

The Electronics and Communication Engineering department has well equipped lab for Advanced Digital-communication, Microprocessor, Micro-controller, C++, Analog-Communication, Digital Signal Processing and Logic Design Lab classes.

Also other departments Civil, Mechanical, Physics and Chemistry have well equipped lab facilities.

=== Other facilities ===
The Students and Staff are provided Internet facility under the National Mission of Education scheme of Government of India.

== Academics ==
GEC Hassan offers undergraduate and postgraduate degrees across 5 disciplines in Engineering. About 40 faculty belonging to science and engineering departments of the Institute are engaged in teaching, research and industrial consultancy.

The college offers undergraduate Bachelor of Engineering (B.E) programmes in five disciplines, namely:

- B.E in Artificial Intelligence and Machine Learning(AIML) from 2024-25
- B.E in Civil Engineering
- B.E in Computer Science and Engineering
- B.E in Electronics and Communication Engineering
- B.E in Mechanical Engineering

=== Admissions ===
For the undergraduate curriculum, admission to the Bachelor of Engineering (B.E) programme is done through the Common Entrance Test(CET) conducted by Karnataka Examination Authority. Students admitted with weaker economical background get either fee reimbursement by Government of Karnataka or scholarships from various social welfare departments.

== Student activities ==
The college cultural committee in co-ordination with the Society for the Promotion of Indian Classical Music And Culture Among Youth(SPIC MACAY) organizes concerts, lectures, demonstrations, informal discussions, and seminars promoting Indian classical music, Indian classical dance, and other aspects of Indian culture. Ananya is the college magazine released by the library that carries the scholarly papers, creative writings, short poems, art-works, etc.,. written by students and faculty of the college.

=== GLUE ===
GECH GNU/Linux Users and Enthusiasts(GLUE) is a Linux user group of GECH which organizes regular events and meetups to learn and share their knowledge on various FOSS technologies. GLUE was started in August 2013 and currently it is having more than 50 active members.

=== GEON ===
GECH Electronics Open hardware Network(GEON) is a Linux Users Group associated with FSMK. GEON is a group made by students of E&CE to learn and explore more about hardware electronics. It strive to implement the Open Hardware philosophy into Electronics as well as support the free and open-source ideology. It works towards design freedom in electronic hardware and promote use of libre tools in academics, research and our daily lives.

GEON regularly conduct sessions, workshops and events where participants are involved in hands-on project developments, activities, and philosophical discussions. GEON was started in 2016 and currently it is having more than 50 active members.

=== Gech Utsav ===
Gech Utsav is the annual techno-cultural festival of GEC, Hassan. It is typically held in the first week of May. Competitive activities cover design events, treasure hunt, singing, rangoli, short-film making, face painting, quizzes, indoor and outdoor sports.

=== Science Club activities ===
Science Club activities are mainly conducted for newly admitted first year students to impart scientific fundamentals to strengthen their abilities to perform well in their higher semesters. The Science club activities may be conducted every Friday afternoon under unique Friday activities like QUIZ, technical debates, pick and speak etc. It is conducted by Basic Science and English & Humanity departments.

== Helpline center ==
This college is the helpline center for verification of documents of the candidates who have assigned ranks in CET-2012 Examination conducted by Karnataka Examination Authority(KEA). Candidates belonging to Hassan, Chickmagalur, Kodagu, Mandya and Tumkur districts have to get their original documents verified in this Helpline Center to be eligible for Option Entry for choice of allotment of Professional Course seat.
