= Bimla Bissell =

Indian businesswoman (1932–2025)

Bimla Bissell (12 October 1932 – 9 January 2025) was an Indian businesswoman. She was the social secretary to four American ambassadors to India. In 1960, she and her husband John Bissell founded the company FabIndia, a home furnishing export company. Bissell was born in Balochistan, British India on 12 October 1932, and died from complications of diabetes on 9 January 2025, at the age of 92.
