= Lynching of Anjel Chakma =

Crime in India in 2025

- Location: 30.3540°N 77.8766°E; Dehradun Uttarakhand, India
- Date: December 9, 2025; 10 months ago
- Attack type: Lynching
- Deaths: 1
- Victim: Anjel Chakma
- Perpetrator: est. 6 people
- Accused: 6

Lynching of Anjel Chakma refers to the fatal stabbing and death of Anjel Chakma, a 24‑year‑old MBA student from Tripura, India, following a violent, racially charged assault in Dehradun, Uttarakhand, in December 2025. Prior to the incident, Chakma and his younger brother were subjected to repeated ethnic epithets such as "Chinki", "Chinese", and "Momo" because of their northeastern Indian appearance. During the attack, Chakma was stabbed and later died on 26 December 2025 after 17 days in hospital, while his brother sustained non‑fatal injuries. The incident sparked nationwide protests and compelled Uttarakhand Police to form a SIT to probe Chakma's death.

== Lynching ==
The incident happened when Anjel and his brother Michel went to a market in the Selakui area of the city on the evening of 9 December 2025 to buy some household items, where they met intoxicated men insulting them as "Chinese momo" and other racial slurs. Anjel replied that he was also Indian, not Chinese, but the group attacked both brothers with knives and blunt objects. Anjel suffered head, neck and spinal injuries and was hospitalised for over two weeks before he succumbed to his injuries on 26 December 2025.

== Reactions ==
Soon after the death of Anjel, BBC stated that the killing of Anjel Chakma has renewed calls for a specific anti-racism law.

Following the incident, the All India Chakma Students’ Union (AICSU) demanded shifting of murder trial out of the State. Students from Northeast India staged a protest at the Jantar Mantar, New Delhi demanding justice for Anjel Chakma. Voice raised with slogans as “Stop Racism”, “We Are Indians”, and “We Want Justice.”

A nationwide protests were demonstrated with a call against racism ‘We are not Chinese’ over lynching of Anjel Chakma and urging justice for the victim.

Leader of the Opposition in Lok Sabha Rahul Gandhi condemned the incident and stated it as “horrific hate crime”. Gandhi also stated "Hate doesn’t appear overnight."

Reacting on the incident, Union Minister of India Kiren Rijiju expressed deep anguish and demanded that state police forces adopt a ‘Delhi Police’ style special unit for the safety of people from the Northeast India.

== Police case and aftermath ==
Anjel's brother Michel who was the witness of the incident filed a complaint on 10 December 2025 before Uttarakhand Police and a case was registered on 12 December 2025 against six accused.

However, Tarun Prasad Chakma, father of Anjel and a BSF jawan posted in Manipur alleged that that the police initially refused to register a case, terming the incident a “minor matter”. Witnessing nationwide protests Chief Minister of Uttarakhand Pushkar Singh Dhami spoke to Anjel's father and expressed grief and assured that the accused will be strictly punished and the victim will be given timely justice.

The Uttarakhand Police have arrested five people while the sixth accused Yagyaraj Awasthi, a Nepali national, fled to Nepal. Two accused were juveniles and they were sent to correctional homes, while three other were sent to judicial custody. The police announced a reward of INR 25,000 for information that leads to detain absconding accused Yagyaraj. The police also stated before media that extradition process has been initiated to bring Yagyaraj back from Nepal. The reward money for information leading to Yagyaraj's arrest later has been raised from INR 25,000 to INR 1 lakh.
