= Eurico da Silva =

Indian judge (1933–2025)

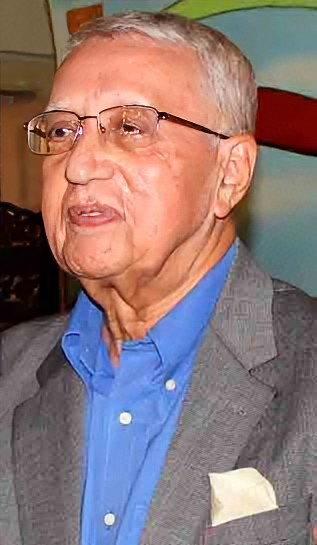
- Silva in 2014
- Born: Eurico Das Dores Santana da Silva; 10 May 1933; Margao, Portuguese Goa
- Died: 28 March 2025 (aged 91); Margao, Goa, India
- Education: University of Coimbra
- Occupations: Justice of The High Court of Bombay, Goa Bench

Eurico Das Dores Santana da Silva (10 May 1933 – 28 March 2025) was an Indian judge of the Bombay High Court Bench at Goa.

== Early life ==
Eurico Das Dores Santana da Silva was born on 10 May 1933 in Margao, Portuguese Goa. He graduated in Law and post graduated in historical and juridical sciences at the University of Coimbra in 1957.

== Career ==
On 6 December 1957, he was appointed as "Julgado Municipal Especial" at Ponda.

On 20 April 1964, he was promoted to Civil Judge, Senior Division and Judicial Magistrate First Class. On 18 April 1974, he was promoted to be the Chief Judicial Magistrate of Goa, Daman and Diu. He progressed in his career and was appointed the first District and Sessions Judge of South Goa upon its creation on 4 February 1981. On 30 July 1990, he was elevated as an additional judge of the Bombay High Court at Goa in 1990 and appointed Puisne (Permanent) Judge in 1991.

== Death ==
Justice Silva died at his residence in Margaon, on 28 March 2025, at the age of 91.
