= Baba Adhav =

Indian social activist (1930–2025)

Babasaheb Pandurang Adhav (1 June 1930 – 8 December 2025) was an Indian social and labour activist and author.

== Life and career ==
Adhav was born in Maharashtra on 1 June 1930.

He was a major figure in the social and labour movement in Maharashtra, and a follower of Satyashodhak. He spent his life organizing underprivileged workers, notably porters, rickshaw pullers and construction workers, ensuring they received social security. He established the 'Hamal Panchayat' which organized porters in Maharashtra, including Pune. He led the revolutionary movement 'One Village One Water' to fight against caste discrimination and tried to establish equality.

Adhav was admitted to Poona Hospital in early December 2025. He died on 8 December, at the age of 95.
