= Detention of Malayali nuns in Chhattisgarh =

Arrest of Malayali Nuns in Chhattisgarh

Two Catholic nuns from Kerala, Sisters Preeti Mary and Vandana Francis, along with a layperson, Sukaman Mandavi, were arrested at Durg Junction railway station in Chhattisgarh, India, on 25 July 2025 and subsequently remanded in custody. The arrests were made on allegations of human trafficking and religious conversion, under the Bharatiya Nyaya Sanhita (BNS) and the Chhattisgarh Religious Freedom Act, 1968. The incident has sparked widespread condemnation and protests, particularly in Kerala, and has drawn significant political attention.

== Description ==
On 25 July 2025, Sister Preeti Mary and Sister Vandana Francis, belonging to the Assisi Sisters of Mary Immaculate (ASMI) congregation, were detained at Durg railway station in Chhattisgarh. They were accompanied by Sukaman Mandavi, and three adult tribal women, all above 18 years of age, from Narayanpur district. According to church representatives, the nuns were accompanying the women to Agra, Uttar Pradesh, where they were to begin work as kitchen helpers in convents, with promised monthly salaries. The nuns stated they possessed all necessary documents, including parental consent forms and identification for the women.

The incident reportedly escalated after a railway ticket examiner questioned the group. Subsequently, members of the Bajrang Dal, a Hindu nationalist organization, gathered at the station and allegedly pressured railway police to register a First Information Report (FIR) against the nuns and Mandavi.

On 31 July, a tribal woman came forward to say that she was forced by Bajalagl Dal to lie.

in October 2025, Three Banjdal Dal members faced charges for molested tribal women.

== Arrest ==
The arrests took place following a complaint filed by a local Bajrang Dal functionary. The nuns, along with Sukaman Mandavi, were booked under Section 143 (trafficking of persons) of the Bharatiya Nyaya Sanhita (BNS) and Section 4 of the Chhattisgarh Religious Freedom Act (1968). Following their arrest, the two nuns and Sukaman Mandavi were remanded to judicial custody until 8 August 2025, by a Judicial Magistrate First Class (JMFC) court. The three women accompanying the nuns were moved to a government-run shelter home. Church representatives alleged that no church officials were allowed to meet the detained nuns and that the young women might have been coerced into changing their statements to claim they were being taken against their will.

== Reactions ==
The detention has elicited strong reactions from various political parties and religious organizations across India, particularly in Kerala.

Kerala Chief Minister Pinarayi Vijayan wrote to the Prime Minister and Union Home Minister, seeking intervention and accusing authorities of harassment and religious bias.

Indian National Congress leader Rahul Gandhi termed the incident "persecution" and "BJP-RSS mob rule," stating that it reflects a dangerous pattern of systematic persecution of minorities under the current regime.

AICC General Secretary K. C. Venugopal and other United Democratic Front (UDF) MPs from Kerala staged protests outside Parliament, demanding immediate release of the nuns and accountability for the injustice. Venugopal described it as a "clear miscarriage of justice and an attack on the rights of minority communities."

Indian Union Muslim League (IUML) state president Sayyid Sadiq Ali Shihab Thangal strongly condemned the arrests, calling them a "grave violation of the religious freedoms guaranteed by the Constitution." He stated that it was "not just a case of false arrest, it is an assault on the very idea of religious liberty enshrined in our Constitution," and highlighted a "continued pattern of assaults on minorities across various parts of the country," urging all secular-minded citizens to unite and resist these actions.

CPI(M) MP John Brittas also addressed a letter to the Chhattisgarh CM, calling the arrest a "disgrace" and a "blatant misuse of the law to target minorities." A delegation led by Brinda Karat also visited the nuns and alleged they were being tortured.

Kerala Opposition Leader V. D. Satheesan called it a "police witch-hunt" and a "mob trial," accusing the Sangh Parivar of hypocrisy.

The Syro-Malabar Church and the Catholic Bishops' Conference of India (CBCI) strongly condemned the arrests, calling it an "attack on minorities" and a "blatant violation of minority rights and religious freedom guaranteed by the Constitution." They stressed that the women were adults, their travel voluntary, and no evidence of conversion existed.
