= Shyam Singh Shashi =

Indian anthropologist and writer (1935–2025)

- Born: 1 July 1935; Haridwar, United Provinces of Agra and Oudh, British India
- Died: 19 February 2025 (aged 89)
- Occupations: Socio–anthropologist; Litterateur; Poet
- Known for: Writings on tribals and nomads
- Board member of: Chairperson, International Institute of Nomadic Studies
- Awards: Padma Shri

Academic background
- Education: Doctor of Philosophy; Doctor of Letters (honoris causa)
- Alma mater: University of Manchester (master's); Agra University (Ph.D.)
- Doctoral advisor: R. N. Saksena

Academic work
- Discipline: Anthropology
- Sub-discipline: Social Anthropology
- Institutions: Former director of Publication Division, Ministry of Information and Broadcasting (India)

Shyam Singh Shashi (1 July 1935 – 19 February 2025) was an Indian socio–anthropologist, litterateur and poet.

== Life and career ==
Shashi was born on 1 July 1935 at Haridwar in India. He did a master's degree in Man Management and Manpower Planning from Manchester University and obtained a doctoral degree in sociology from Agra University for his thesis on Himalayan Nomads making him the first person to complete a Ph.D. from the university. Shashi's doctoral advisor was the social scientist R. N. Saksena.

Starting his career as a government servant, he took voluntary retirement midway through his service and joined the International Institute of Culture and Languages as the chairman of their Media Research and Encyclopedia divisions where he is reported to have edited Encyclopedia of Humanities and Social Sciences (50 vols), Encyclopedia of Indian Tribes (12 vols), Encyclopedia of World Women (10 vols) and Encyclopedia Indica (150 vols).

Shashi was a visiting professor at the Indira Gandhi National Open University (IGNOU), the president of the International Academy of Children's Literature and chaired International Institute of Nomadic Studies. He served as the director of Indian Ministry of Information and Broadcasting's Publication Division, and as the honorary editor of Collected Works of Dr. B.R. Ambedkar which was published in eight Indian languages by the Indian government. He was a member of the jury for the Delhi Gaurav Awards.

Shashi died on 19 February 2025, at the age of 89.

== Honours and awards ==
The University of Colombo honoured Shashi with D.Litt. (honoris causa) for his "pioneering work on Roma of Europe and America", making him the first recipient of D.Litt. from the university in anthropology. In 1990, the Government of India awarded him Padma Shri for his "multifaceted achievements in the field of literature".

== Selected bibliography ==
Shashi also wrote several poem anthologies, travelogues, children's books and anthropological books, over 300 publications in total.

- S. S. Shashi, ed. (2007). International Encyclopaedia of Social Science (20 Vols-Set). Anmol Publications. ISBN 9788126130955.
- S. S. Shashi, ed. (1994). Encyclopedia of Indian Tribes. Anmol Publications. ISBN 9788170418368.
- Shashi S. S., ed. (2002). Encyclopedia of World Women. Sundeep Prakashan. ISBN 9788175741065.
- S. S. Shashi, ed. (2002). Encyclopedia Indica. Anmol Publications. ISBN 9788170418597.
- Shyam Singh Shashi (2006). The World of Nomads. Lotus Press. p. 297. ISBN 9788183820516.
- Shyam Singh Shashi (2014). Ekla Chalo RE. Shilalekh. p. 304. ISBN 978-8173293382.
- S. S. Shahshi (1990). Roma: The Gypsy World. Sandeep Prakashan. p. 253. ISBN 978-8185067445.
- S. S. Shashi, P. S. Varma (1991). Socio-History of Ex-Criminal Communities OBC's. Sandeep Prakashan. p. 321. ISBN 978-8185067698.
