= K. N. Chandrasekharan Pillai =

Indian legal academic (1943–2025)

K. N. Chandrasekharan Pillai (17 March 1943 – 17 January 2025) was an Indian legal academic. He was the onetime director of the Indian Law Institute. He was known as a doyen in the Indian legal academia for his scholarly writings of articles and books.

== Early life and education ==
Pillai was from Chunakkara in the district of Alappuzha, Kerala. He received his B.Sc. from the University of Kerala and received his LL.B. and LL.M. (first rank) from the University of Delhi. He received the Baboo Piare Lal Memorial Prize and the Delhi University Law Union prize, 1974. He received his second LL.M and S.J.D. from the University of Michigan Law School in the United States. He was also the first Director of National University of Advanced Legal Studies (Formerly NIALS). He was until his death on the editorial board of Cochin University Law Review and Academy Law Review.

== Career ==
Pillai practised law before the Supreme Court of India before joining the Campus Law Centre at the University of Delhi. He joined Cochin University of Science and Technology and became director and later dean of the School of Legal Studies there. He served as the director-designate of the National University of Advanced Legal Studies, Cochin. After that he became the Director of Indian Law institute. He was the Director of National Judicial Academy, Bhopal till 31 March 2013. He pursued his academic activities from Cochin. He was the author of a book on criminal law and was the revised author of R V Kelkar's Lectures on Criminal Procedure and Text Book on Criminal Procedure Code.

Pillai was a part-time member of the Law Commission of India, member of the syndicate of Cochin University of Science and Technology representing the University Grants Commission, editor of the Journal Section of Supreme Court Cases, Lucknow. He was also the editor of the Journal of the Indian Law Institute, New Delhi and was a member of the editorial boards of the Cochin University Law Review, Academy Law Review, Kerala Bar Council News, and Bangalore Law Journal. He was also the member of the academic council of National University of Advanced Legal Studies.

Pillai was the author of several books.

Pillai was the Director, Indian Law Institute and thereafter he was Director, National Judicial academy National Judicial Academy, India at Bhopal. He reviewed the RV Kelkar Criminal Procedure and Lectures on Criminal Procedure periodically. He loved his students and gave the opportunity to his students to assist him in reviewing the books. He had his student, the assistant director (Law), S.V.P. National Police Academy, Mr. K. Pattabhi Rama Rao's assistance in reviewing his Lectures on Criminal Procedure. Until his death, he resided in Kochi.

== Personal life and death ==
Pillai lived in Thrikkakara, Cochin. He died on 17 January 2025, at the age of 81.
