= Nellai S. Muthu =

Indian Tamil writer (1951–2025)

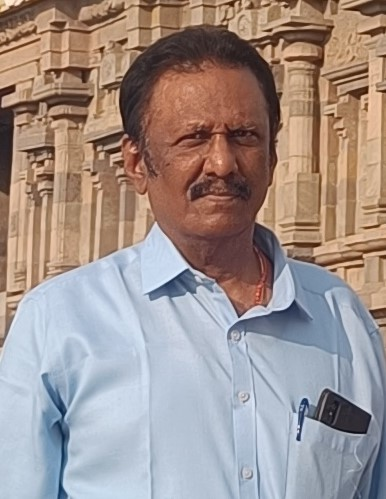
Muthu photographed outside Thyagaraja Temple, Tiruvarur sometime before March 2024

Nellai S. Muthu (10 May 1951 – 16 June 2025) was an Indian Tamil writer and a scientist working at the Satish Dhawan Space Centre. He wrote many technical books and novels based on science in Tamil. He won several awards from the Tamil development department of Tamil Nadu for his works Vinveli 2057, Arivutom vingana vilaiyattu, Einsteinum andaveliyum and Ariviyal varalaru. Muthu died in Thiruvananthapuram, Kerala on 16 June 2025, at the age of 74.

== Awards ==
Muthu received an award from the government of India's National Council for Science and Technology in 2004 for making science accessible to the public through his books, magazine contributions, and other media. He received the Mahakavi Bharathi Aiynthamizh award in the Ariviyal Tamil category from Bharathiar University. He also received the Pal Maruthuvar G. Sitrambalanar award for his work Evurthiyiyal.
