= Tarun Bhartiya =

Indian documentary filmmaker (1970–2025)

Tarun Bhartiya (1970 – 27 January 2025) was an Indian documentary filmmaker, poet, photographer, and social activist known for his contributions to art, culture, and social issues. Born to Maithil origins but closely associated with the Khasi Hills of Meghalaya, Bhartiya's work explored diverse themes related to the region and beyond. He had received a National Film Award for his work as film editor for the 2009 film In Camera, Diaries of a Documentary Cameraman but he returned it in 2015.

== Background ==
Bhartiya was born in 1970. He died from a heart attack at Woodland Hospital in Shillong, on 27 January 2025, at the age of 54.

== Career ==
=== Documentary filmmaking ===
Bhartiya's work as a documentary filmmaker was recognized for examining the intersections of humanity, environment, and politics. His notable films include:

- The Brief Life of Insects (2015) – Winner of the Best Sound Award at MIFF (Mumbai International Film Festival).
- The Last Train in Nepal (2015) – A BBC4 production that received the Royal Television Society's (RTS) Award for Best Director, Factual.
- Darjeeling Himalayan Railway (2010) – Recipient of the Royal Television Society's Best Documentary Series Award.
- Tourist Information for Shillong (2007).

In addition to his own work, Bhartiya contributed as an editor on several projects, collaborating with filmmakers such as Vasudha Josh.

=== Poetry ===
Bhartiya's poetry, written in Hindi, connected with readers across different cultural and linguistic backgrounds. His work appeared in anthologies such as Dancing Earth: Contemporary Poetry from Northeast India. His writing often reflected themes of identity, emotion, and regional culture.

=== Photography ===
As a photographer, Bhartiya captured the social and natural landscapes of Meghalaya. His black-and-white photographs documented the region's complexities and relationships between people and nature. His work was exhibited widely and remains influential.

=== Activism ===
Bhartiya was active in social movements and protests. In 2015, he returned his National Award for Best Editing to protest against what he described as state oppression.

He also worked on documenting the changing belief systems of the Khasi community. His project Niam/Faith/Hynniewtrep explored the interactions between Christianity, indigenous practices, and external cultural influences. This work included exhibitions, postcards, and texts that contributed to discussions on identity and modernity in Northeast India.
