= Killing of Radhika Yadav =

2025 murder in India

- Date: 10 July 2025
- Location: Gurugram, Haryana, India
- Type: Murder, Honor killing
- Motive: Unknown
- Deaths: Radhika Yadav
- Inquiries: Haryana Police
- Suspects: Her father

Radhika Yadav, a 25-year-old state-level tennis player and coach, was killed by her father, Deepak Yadav, on 10 July 2025, in Gurugram, Haryana, India. The case garnered significant media attention due to the victim's prominence in sports, and allegations of familial control and societal pressures as contributing factors. Her father was arrested and confessed to the killing, citing disputes over Radhika’s tennis coaching and social taunts about her income. The case sparked widespread discussion on gender dynamics, domestic violence, and the challenges faced by female athletes in India.

== Background ==
Radhika Yadav, born on 23 March 2000, was a state-level tennis player who competed in national and international tournaments, achieving a career-best ranking of 75 in the Girls Under-18 category. A shoulder injury two years prior to her death halted her competitive career, leading her to coach aspiring players by booking tennis courts across Gurugram, contrary to initial reports that she owned a tennis academy.

Her father, aged 49–54 (sources vary), had invested over ₹2.5 crore in her tennis training, a point of contention in their relationship. The family, based in Sushant Lok-2 and Sector 57, Gurugram, was financially secure through real estate ventures, including property leasing and land deals.

== Murder ==
On 10 July 2025, at approximately 10:30 am, Radhika Yadav was shot four times in the back and waist allegedly by her father, while cooking breakfast in their double-storey home in Sushant Lok-2, Gurugram. She was rushed to a hospital but died from her injuries.

The murder weapon was a licensed pistol, and the Yadav's father confessed to the crime, reportedly telling his brother, “Maine kanya vadh kar diya hai” (I have committed kanya vadh) and expressing a desire to be hanged.

Radhika’s mother, was on the first floor during the incident and was later cleared of involvement by police, who found no evidence of her knowledge or participation.

== Investigation ==
Yadav's father was arrested at the family’s residence shortly after the killing and sent to one-day police custody on 11 July 2025, followed by 14-day judicial custody on 12 July 2025.

Police stated that the father had planned the killing, citing his depression over social mockery and his attempts to force Radhika to delete her social media accounts and stop coaching.
