= K. K. Gangadharan =

Indian translator (1949–2025)

- Born: 10 March 1949; Pathanadukka, Madras State, Dominion of India
- Died: 19 January 2025 (aged 75); Bengaluru, Karnataka
- Education: University of Mysore
- Occupation: Translator
- Spouse: Radha
- Children: 1
- Writing career
- Notable awards: Sahitya Akademi Translation Prize

K. K. Gangadharan (10 March 1949 – 19 January 2025) was a Malayalam-Kannada translator from Kerala, India. He has translated the works of many Malayalam writers into Kannada and has translated 235 of Madhavikutty's 243 stories into Kannada. In 2024, he received the Sahitya Akademi Translation Prize for Kannada.

== Biography ==
K. K. Gangadharan was born on 10 March 1949, in Pathanadukka in present-day Kasaragod district of Kerala. Kasaragod district was not formed at that time. When he was still a child, his family migrated to the village of Kabbinasetuve in Kodagu district. He received his education at a Kannada medium school in Somwarpet, Kodagu. After his primary education in Kajur and Somwarpet, he obtained his B.Sc. degree from Vivekananda College, Puttur, under the University of Mysore.

Gangadharan, who worked as an extra-departmental staff member in the Indian postal department for a short period, served at Kothari Coffee Curing Works in Hassan from 1970 to 1973. He joined the Railway Mail Service in 1974 and retired from there in 2009. Working in various places in Karnataka as a Railway Mail Service officer increased his connection with the Kannada language. He has also served as a postal employees' union representative, while in the RMS service.

Gangadharan died on 19 January 2025, in Bengaluru, while undergoing treatment at M.S. Ramaiah Hospital in Bengaluru. He had been on treatment for liver and kidney disease for some time.

=== Personal life ===
Gangadharan and his wife Radha have a son named Sarath Kumar. They lived on Magadi Road in Bengaluru, since 1979.

== Literary career ==
His first Kannada article was published in a local newspaper, 'Shakti', when he was about 19 years old. But it was on a local issue.

Gangadharan began his literary career by writing a few stories and poems in Kannada under the guidance of Amruth Someswaran, a former professor at Vivekananda College. In 1978, he entered the field of translation by translating the series of articles by E. M. S. Namboodiripad titled E.M.S. Namboodiripadinte Chodyotharangal in the Odanadi magazine published from Mysore. It was published for eight consecutive months.

Gangadharan has translated many works by famous Malayalam writers into Kannada. The most important of these are the stories of Madhavikutty. He translated 235 of Madhavikutty's 243 stories into Kannada. This was published in five books. His love for Madhavikutty's stories and the interest in them among Kannada readers motivated him to translate so many of her stories.

Gangadharan also translated stories by prominent Malayalam writers such as Thakazhi Sivasankara Pillai, Vaikom Muhammad Basheer, M. T. Vasudevan Nair, T. Padmanabhan, Punathil Kunjabdulla, Malayattoor Ramakrishnan, U. K. Kumaran, etc. Novels by Ettumanoor Sivakumar and Mezhuveli Babuji have also been translated. He also translated the biography of Kerala politician E. K. Nayanar and the autobiography of actress Shakeela into Kannada.

The book Malayalam Kathegalu (translation:Malayalam Stories), for which he received the Sahitya Akademi Award for Translation, is the translation of stories by 25 Malayalam writers including Thakazhi, Basheer, M. T., T. Padmanabhan, Malayattoor Ramakrishnan, Punathil Kunjabdulla, U. K. Kumaran, Santhosh Aechikkanam, and Benyamin. It was published by the Government of Karnataka's Kuvempu Bhasha Bharathi Pradhikara in 2019.

He also translated stories for Kannada publications. Punathil's Panchaliyude lokam was translated and published in the Kannada magazine Mallike. Translated stories by Malayalam writers have also been published in Kannada publications such as Tharanga, Mayura, Sudha and Thushara.

Some of the stories translated by Gangadharan have become part of textbooks in Kerala and Karnataka. His translation of Basheer's Janmandinagal was included in the Kannada textbook of Bengaluru University and his translation of Madhavikutty's Swathantrya Samara Senaniyute Makal was included in the syllabus of B.A. in Akka Mahadevi Karnataka State Women's University, Vijayapura. The translation of Prabhakaran Pazhassi's story Bharameriya Pezhs is included in the Kannada medium ninth class textbook of Kerala.

== Awards and honors ==
Gangadharan received the Government of Karnataka's Kuvempu Bhasha Bharathi Pradhikara Award in 2010 and 2017. In March 2024, he received the Sahitya Akademi Translation Prize for Kannada.
