= 2025 Gulzar Houz fire =

Structure fire in India

- Date: 18 May 2025
- Time: ~4:45 AM IST
- Location: Gulzar Houz, Hyderabad, Telangana, India
- Cause: Suspected electrical short circuit
- Deaths: 17
- Injuries: Several
- Property damage: Extensive damage to a three-story building

A fire in a building in Hyderabad, India, on 18 May 2025, killed 17 people, including eight children, and injured several more. The deceased, all members of the same family, were gathered for a family reunion when a fire broke out in the early morning. At about 4:45 am (IST), a display cabinet on the ground floor of the building, which housed a pearl shop, short-circuited and caused an explosion in an air conditioning unit's compressor. Fire rapidly spread through the building, exacerbated by wooden interiors and a lack of proper ventilation.

A worker noticed the fire, and alerted the family, who attempted to extinguish the fire themselves for about 45 minutes before emergency services were contacted; this delay contributed to the severity of the fire. The rest of the family went to the first floor to escape the smoke. At 6 am, two women from the family exited the building to alert nearby people about the fire, and those people contacted emergency services, who received the first distress call 16 minutes later. Eleven fire engines were dispatched, and the fire was brought under control by 9 am.

Many politicians, both at the national and state level, offered condolences. Prime Minister Narendra Modi and the Telangana state government announced ex gratia payments to the family of the deceased and to the injured. Telangana chief minister Revanth Reddy ordered a committee to investigate the fire; as of July 2025, there has not been any instructions given to the committee members nor the release of a report.

== Background ==
The eight-room three-storey (G+2) building was estimated to be about 125 years old at the time of the fire. It was built in the Nizam-Hyderabadi style by Manoharlal Poonamchand, an immigrant from Rajasthan and the founder of Modi Pearls, and was inhabited by his descendants, the Modi family. There were shops on the ground floor and the family lived on the first and second floors. According to The Hindu, the building was centered around a central courtyard with a skylight.

The extended family from across India had gathered at the house to attend a family reunion in Attapur, and children were present due to the summer holidays. A total of about 21 people were in the building when the fire broke out, and were asleep.

The building's wooden interiors and lack of ventilation facilitated the rapid spread of smoke and flames. Additionally, the structure had only a single narrow exit, hindering evacuation efforts. The absence of basic fire safety measures, such as fire extinguishers and proper electrical earthing, further exacerbated the situation.

Parked motorcycles completely blocked the ground floor exit and their fuel further fed the fire. The building had 14 air conditioning (AC) units, which put excessive pressure on aged power cables. Likely due to the presence of the AC units, all of the windows in the building were closed, which caused the building to effectively act as a gas chamber.

== Incident ==
The fire reportedly started around 4:45 am IST (UTC+05:30) in the ground-floor pearl shop of the building, likely due to a short circuit in the display cabinet's wiring. This led to an explosion in the air-conditioner's compressor, causing the fire to spread rapidly through the building, which had wooden interiors and lacked proper ventilation.

A worker noticed the fire, and alerted the family, three of whom attempted to extinguish the fire with buckets and domestic water pipes for approximately 45 minutes before emergency services were contacted. The delay in reporting the fire contributed to the severity of the incident. The remaining family members went to the first floor to escape the smoke, as they expected the fire to be brought under control and assumed that it would not spread.

At 6 am IST, two women from the family exited the building to alert nearby people about the fire; these people contacted emergency services. The first distress call was received by emergency services at 6:16 am IST, after which a fire engine from Moghalpura was dispatched, and it reached the building four minutes later. Ten more fire engines responded to the incident and a total of 87 firefighters were involved in the rescue operation. The firefighters could not use the entrance, as it was blocked by motorcycles, and instead entered the neighboring building and knocked down a wall on the second floor. The fire was brought under control by 9 am IST.

Before emergency services had arrived, thirteen people were saved by two men returning from namaz (morning prayers). They had rushed into the building at 6:10 am after they heard two women yelling Bhaiya, bachao! ("Brother, save us!" in Hindustani). After breaking down two barriers, they found a room with women and children trapped inside. Then, they climbed to the second floor, where they found six more people. The two brought survivors out of the building at 8:40 am. Other bystanders assisted fire and ambulance crews in various ways, such as directing traffic as ad hoc traffic police, helping firefighters set up ladders and hoses, and assisting ambulance crews with stretchers.

=== Casualties ===
All 17 victims were members of jeweler Prahlad Modi's family, spanning three generations, and all had asphyxiated due to the smoke; their bodies were recovered unburnt. All of the child victims were below the age of seven. Three of the victims had previously escaped, but were overcome by smoke and heat after they reentered the burning building to save others. The remains of the victims were brought to the Osmania General Hospital's mortuary at around 11:30 am from various hospitals. Fifteen of the victims were cremated in Puranapul, in the presence of police and the Hyderabad district collector, and two were cremated in Punjagutta and Kukatpally.

An unnamed fire official quoted by The Hindu said that the death toll would have been lower if the occupants of the building had instead "rushed to the terrace". Though the door to the terrace was locked, four people were rescued from it by ladder.

== Aftermath ==
Prime Minister Narendra Modi said that he was 'deeply anguished' by the incident and announced a ₹200,000 (equivalent to ₹210,000 or US$2,100 in 2026) payment to the deceased's next of kin, and ₹50,000 (equivalent to ₹52,000 or US$540 in 2026) to the injured; both of which to be paid from the Prime Minister's National Relief Fund. President Droupadi Murmu, Lok Sabha opposition leader Rahul Gandhi, Minister of Home Affairs Bandi Sanjay Kumar, and Legislature Party Leader Alleti Maheshwar Reddy offered condolences.

The Government of Telangana announced a ₹500,000 (equivalent to ₹520,000 or US$5,400 in 2026) payment to the deceased's family members. Chief minister Revanth Reddy ordered an investigation into the cause of the fire. As of 2 July 2025, no report has been issued by the investigative committee, nor have there been any instructions given to the committee members. The Telangana State Human Rights Commission said that they suspected gross negligence in the building's electrical and fire safety systems. In July, the Telangana government announced another payment of ₹8,500,000 (equivalent to ₹8.8 million or US$91,000 in 2026) to the victims, paid from the chief minister's relief fund.

Former Telangana chief minister K. Chandrashekar Rao, former minister T. Harish Rao, and MLC Kalvakuntla Kavitha offered their condolences to the relatives of the victims. Bharat Rashtra Samithi working president K. T. Rama Rao criticised Revanth Reddy for not visiting the scene of the fire; K. T. Rama Rao had visited the family's residence in Attapur to give condolences. He also implored the government to provide a ₹2,500,000 (equivalent to ₹2.6 million or US$27,000 in 2026) ex gratia to each of the families of the victims.

Suchata Chuangsri, winner of Miss World 2025, posted on social media that she had met three of the girls who died in the fire during a heritage walk in Laad Bazaar on 15 May, and that she prays for their souls and hopes that they would meet again in their next lives. During a visit to the Telangana Secretariat on 19 May, 10 other Miss World contestants, along with ministers and officials, participated in a minute of silence in honour of the victims.

Government officials from various departments inspected the site, and the Charminar police registered a case to investigate the incident further. In response to the incident, the Telangana Fire Department collaborated with a local gaming company to recreate the incident using visual effects (VFX) for investigative and educational purposes.

The two men that rescued 13 people from the burning building were felicitated by the All India Majlis-e-Ittehadul Muslimeen at their headquarters.

== See also ==
- Uphaar Cinema fire
- Anaj Mandi fire
- Kamala Mills fire
