= Akella Venkata Suryanarayana =

Indian writer, playwright and screenwriter (1950–2025)

- Born: 10 February 1950; Kakinada, East Godavari district, Madras State, India
- Died: 18 September 2025 (aged 75); Nizampet, Hyderabad, Telangana, India
- Other name: Akella
- Occupations: Telugu writer, playwright, screenwriter
- Notable work: Over 80 Telugu films, 25 published plays
- Spouse: Ramalakshmi
- Children: 1 son and 4 daughters
- Awards: Sahitya Akademi Award (Kaaki Engili); 13-time Nandi Award winner Kala Ratna (Hamsa) Ugadi Award (2013); Vishalandhra Award; Andhra Prabha Award; Yuva Chakrapani Award; Vijaya Monthly Award (twice)

Akella Venkata Suryanarayana (10 February 1950 – 18 September 2025) was an Indian Telugu writer, playwright and screenwriter. He contributed stories and dialogues to more than 80 Telugu films, wrote around 200 short stories, 20 novels, and over 800 television episodes. His works often focused on themes relating to women's lives and social issues.

== Background ==
Suryanarayana was born on 10 February 1950 in Kakinada, East Godavari district, Andhra Pradesh, to Janaki and Ramayya. From childhood, he showed interest in literature and stage plays, making his debut in theatre in 1960 as Balaramudu.

Suryanarayana died at his residence in Nizampet, Hyderabad, on 18 September 2025, at the age of 75. He was survived by his wife, Ramalakshmi, four daughters, and one son.

== Literary career ==
Suryanarayana began by writing stories for magazines such as Chandamama and Balamitra. After completing his degree, he wrote his first novel. Over the years, he authored nearly 200 short stories and 20 novels, many of which were translated into other Indian languages.

He also wrote more than 800 episodes for Telugu television serials. His writing covered social dramas, children's plays, poetic dramas, and radio plays.

In 1997, he wrote his first notable play Kaaki Engili, followed by historical dramas such as Allasani Peddana, Rani Rudrama, and Rana Pratap.

On 21 May 2022, a compilation of 25 of his plays was released at Ravindra Bharathi, Hyderabad.

== Film career ==
Akella contributed stories and dialogues to more than 80 Telugu films. His scripts were known for addressing women-centric and family themes.

Some notable films include:

- Maga Maharaju (first film)
- Swathi Muthyam
- Shrutilayalu
- Adade Aadharam
- Sirivennela
- Srimathi Oka Bahumathi
- Nagadevatha
- Illu Illalu Pillalu
- O Bharya Katha
- Ayanaki Iddaru
- Chilakapacha Kapuram
- Ounanna Kadanna
- Entha Baavundo
- Ayyayyo Brahmayya (also as director)

== Plays ==
Akella's plays were published in three volumes, and a collection of 25 plays was formally released in 2022. Some of his notable plays include:

- Kaaki Engili (is his first play)
- Cross Roads
- Air India
- Moondo Purushardham
- Oru Pisachalu
- Om
- Anna! Zindabad
- Mee Illu Ekkada
- Rishi
- Parugu
- O Kalaneeta
- Anjali
- Ratri Shatruvu
- Nalugu Simham
- Indian Gas
- Pedalaki Matrame
- Shanti Yuddham
- Kotta Sainyam
- Talupu
- Sahaprayaanam
- Jeevana Vedam
- Chattame Nannu Rakshistundi
- Telakapindi Tayaramma
- Talli Dandrulu Jagratta
- Bhayam

== Awards ==
- Sahitya Akademi Award – for the play Kaaki Engili
- 13-time Nandi Award winner as Best Writer
- Kala Ratna (Hamsa) Ugadi Award – Andhra Pradesh Government (2013)
- Vishalandhra Award
- Andhra Prabha Award
- Yuva Chakrapani Award
- Vijaya Monthly Award (twice)
