= Samarendra Narayan Dev =

Indian filmmaker (1940–2025)

Samarendra Narayan Dev (13 October 1940 – 26 January 2025) was an Indian filmmaker. His film career, spanning four decades, has also brought laurels and recognition to Assam. His first independent celluloid depiction, Aranya (1971), was based on the dwindling rhinoceros population in Assam. It brought him the National Award in the best feature film category (regional) in 1971.

During the 1970s and 1980s, Narayan Dev made more women-centric films. Aranya 1971, and Putalar Ghar 1976, represented women of different social strata. While in Aranya, Bidya Rao played a carefree woman's character. Putalar Ghar represented the childlike innocence in a young woman and her transitions in life from childhood to adult age.

== Early life ==
Samarendra Narayan Dev, the descendant of the Darrang Royal Family was born on 13 October 1940 at Mangaldai in Darrang District of Assam. His father, Bhupendra Narayan Dev, was an honorary magistrate and a member of Legislative Assembly of Assam. His mother was Saroj Devi. From his childhood he had a craze about stage drama plays. He used to write drama plays and performed from the age of 14. While he was in college he got the opportunity to perform on stage with the likes of the great Bishnu Rabha and Phani Sharma in the drama Siraj. Bhikha (The Alms) and Bandor Aaru Jokhola (The monkey and the ladder) are the two plays for which he received best director's award and also best drama award from Assam Natya Sanmiloni. His play Bheko-Bhaona also got published in Naytya Sankalan, published by Sangeet Natak Academy. Slowly his attention turned towards movies and he wished to become a filmmaker. He went to Kolkata in 1967 and got his first break as an assistant director in the same year under Director Ashutosh Bannerjee in Tini Bhuboner Pare. In 1970 he came back to Assam and started his own movie Arayna, it was produced by a club called United Club constituted of his friends including himself. So they named the production house as "United Production". "Arayna" was critically acclaimed and went on to win National award for best film in regional language. It was heart-warming for him as it dealt with a subject like wild life protection and was a new experience for the Assamese audience and gained appreciation from them. His second movie PUTALA GHAR also went on to win a national award for best film in regional language. Altogether he made six movies till date including his comeback movie with an historical subject called "BIR CHILARAI" in 2013. He made many TV series, TV movies and documentaries in Hindi, Assamese and English. In 1995, he got an opportunity to do a Television film on DD-1 named "DARPAN".

== Death ==
Narayan Dev died on 26 January 2025, at the age of 84.

== Filmography ==
=== Films ===
- Aranya – 1971: Won presidential award for best film in regional language.
- Putalaghar – 1976: Won National award for best film in regional language.
- Sunor Horin – 1979.
- Kazirangar Kahini – 1981.
- Raja – 1981.
- Bir Chiralai – 2013.

=== Tele-films ===
- Dawar – 1991.
- Darpan – 1996.
- Nishikta Pradah – 1999.
- Mur Gaor Sadhuu – 2001 (For P.P.C).

=== Documentaries ===
- Devadashi Nritya – 1994.
- Biyas Ojapali – 1994.
- Khulia Bhaoria – 1994.
- Suknani Ojapali and Deodhani Nritya – 1997.
- Swarharekha – 2001.

=== Television series ===
- Sasipathor Puthi – 1997.
- Ajak Borokhoonor Apakhyat – 2002.
- Intezaar – 2002.
- Amritashya Putra – 2003.
- Maa O Meri Maa – 2003.
- Nayee Raah – 2005.
- Mera Waton Ke Logo – 2007.
- Andharat Nijor Mukh – 2011.
