= Hema Sane =

Indian botanist (1940–2025)

- Born: 13 March 1940
- Died: 19 September 2025 (aged 85); Pune, Maharashtra, India
- Education: Savitribai Phule Pune University
- Occupations: Botanist, writer
- Years active: 1962–2000

Hema Sane (13 March 1940 – 19 September 2025) was an Indian botanist, environmentalist, educator and author, known for her minimalist, electricity-free lifestyle and long service in botanical education.

== Early life and education ==
Hema Sane was born on 13 March 1940. She completed her PhD from Pune University and later obtained an MPhil in Indology.

== Career ==
From 1962 until her retirement in 2000, Sane taught botany at Abasaheb Garware College in Pune. She served as the head of the Botany Department and mentored many doctoral students.

She authored more than 30 books covering botany, medicinal plants, sustainable development, plant morphology, the trees of Buddhism and Indian flora.

== Lifestyle and philosophy ==
Sane was known for living without electricity in her ancestral four-storey wada in Pune’s Budhwar Peth, considering it consistent with her principles of simplicity and ecological harmony. For decades she refused modern appliances: she used kerosene lamps, relied on natural lighting, and owned minimal possessions—only books, papers, and a few saris.

She shared her home with animals including cats, a mongoose, and birds, often describing herself as their caretaker. She often quoted that electricity came later in human history and that basic needs were food, clothing, and shelter.

== Death ==
Sane died on 19 September 2025 in Pune at the age of 85 due to age-related ailments.

== Legacy ==
Hema Sane is remembered both for her scholarly contributions to Indian botany and her role as an exemplar of sustainable, low-consumption living. Her life and work continue to inspire discussions on ecological consistency, minimalism, and the integration of scientific knowledge with philosophy.

== Selected works ==
- Medicinal Plants
- Plant Morphology and Anatomy
- Kahani Masalayanchi (story of spices)
- Marg Shashwat Vikasawa (on sustainable development)
- Buddh Parampara Aani Bodhivriksha (trees of Buddhism)
