= Ram Sahay Panday =

Indian folk dancer (1933–2025)

Ram Sahay Panday (11 March 1933 – 8 April 2025) was an Indian Rai dancer from Sagar in the state of Madhya Pradesh. The Rai (also spelt as Raai) dance was traditionally associated with the Bedia community which itself was associated with flesh trade. Even though he was not a member of the community, he devoted his whole life to the practice and performance of the Rai dance and to secure acceptance and respectability for the dance form. His tireless efforts helped obtain national and international recognition of this dance form.

"The dance form Raai (or Rai) is basically a folk dance of the Bundelkhand region. Raai means mustard seeds. When mustard seeds are put in a saucer they swing. Similarly, natives of the region also swing around when singer sings tales and songs. It is sort of a competition between the beats of music and the dancers. The drummer and the dancer try to win each other and the competition leads to a bliss."

In the year 2022, the Government of India honoured Ram Sahay Panday by conferring the Padma Shri award for his contributions to art.

== Life and work ==
Ram Sahay Panday was born in a Brahmin family on 11 March 1933 in Maddhar Patha village, now in Sagar district in Madhya Pradesh. His father Lalju Panday was a farmer and Ram Sahay Panday was the youngest among four brothers. Panday's first exposure to the Rai dance happened when he was 14 years old. Fascinated by the dance form he began practising it. In Madhya Pradesh, the folk dance of Rai is associated with the Bedia community. They are a nomadic tribe that had been notified under the Criminal Tribes Act. Also, some people associate the community with flesh trade. Because of this stigma attached to the community and their dance form, Panday's family was totally opposed to his practising the Rai dance form. Panday has been reported as saying "I was fighting with my family as well as the Brahmin community for practising this dance. I used to convince them that this is an art form nothing else but they ostracised me. But it only motivated me to take it to the zenith." Even his children were ashamed of their father for being a Rai dancer.

In 1948, he performed Rai dance at Akashvani Bhopal in the presence of the then Madhya Pradesh Chief Minister Govind Narayan Singh and many other dignitaries. They were amazed with the dance form and that event happened to be a turning point in his life as after that he began getting some respect in society. Today this dance of Bundelkhand has made its own identity for which a lot of credit goes to Ram Sahai Panday. Panday trained young men and women in Rai dance for many years. In the year 2006, under the leadership of Panday, Rai dance was presented in Dubai by the Government of Madhya Pradesh.

In the year 2000, an organization named Bundeli Folk Dance and Natya Kala Parishad was established, where training is being given in the Rai dance.

Panday died on 8 April 2025, at the age of 92.

== Padma Shri award ==
- In the year 2022, Govt of India conferred the Padma Shri award, the third highest award in the Padma series of awards, on Ram Sahay Panday for his distinguished service in the field of art. The award is in recognition of his service as a "Renowned Rai Folk Dancer from Sagar known for popularizing Bundeli Folk."

== Other recognitions ==
- Elected a member of the Tribal Lokkala Parishad established by the Madhya Pradesh government (1980)
- Honoured with the title "Nritya Shiromani" by the Madhya Pradesh government (1980)
- Awarded "Shikhar samman" by Madha Pradesh government (1984)

== See also ==
- Padma Shri Award recipients in the year 2022
