= Mudundi Ramakrishna Raju =

Indian physicist (1930–2025)

- Born: 1930; Bhimavaram, Madras Presidency, British India
- Died: 25 June 2025 (aged 95); Pedaamiram, West Godavari district, Andhra Pradesh, India
- Occupation: Physicist
- Awards: Padma Shri
- Website: Official web site

Mudundi Ramakrishna Raju (1930 – 25 June 2025) was an Indian physicist, known for his research on the application of nuclear physics to cancer therapy. He hailed from the Indian state of Andhra Pradesh and was the Managing Trustee of the International Cancer Centre, Mahatma Gandhi Memorial Medical Trust located at Bhimavaram. He was reported to have 35 years of research experience in radiation therapy at various institutions in the US such as Massachusetts General Hospital, Harvard University, Massachusetts Institute of Technology, Lawrence Berkeley National Laboratory, University of California, Berkeley and Los Alamos National Laboratory and is credited with several articles on the topic. Raju was honoured by the Government of India, in 2013, with the fourth highest Indian civilian award of Padma Shri. Raju died on 25 June 2025, at the age of 95.

== See also ==
- Radiation therapy
