= Bruno Dias Souza =

Indian architect (1925–2025)

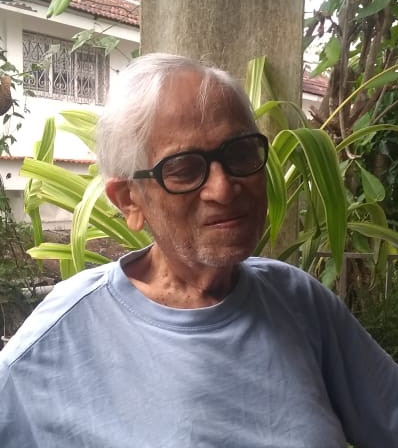
- Souza in 2020
- Born: 6 October 1925; Goa, Portuguese India
- Died: 2 March 2025 (aged 99)
- Education: St. Xavier's College (BSc); Columbia University (B.Arch, 1955); Harvard University (M.Arch, 1957)
- Occupation: Architect
- Spouse: Edna Miranda Souza
- Children: 4
- Awards: Sócio Honorário -- Ordem dos Arquitectos

Bruno Dias Souza (6 October 1925 – 2 March 2025) was an Indian architect who was credited with having "belonged to a generation of architects that sought to rediscover what modern architecture meant for India" and having had an "illustrious architectural career".

== Early life ==
Bruno Dias Souza was born on 6 October 1925 in Goa, Portuguese India. He was raised in the Goan village of Badem in Salvador do Mundo, building models of boats and little houses as a child. He was educated at the Liceu Nacional Afonso de Albuquerque in the then Portuguese-ruled Goa. He moved to Dharwad and Bombay for inter-science and a stint in mathematics and physics as part of the B.Sc. programme at St Xavier's College.

After his undergraduate and postgraduate studies in the United States, he worked for international firms in Central as well as South America—including in Brasília, Brazil, before returning to Goa. In Goa, still under Portuguese rule, he designed government primary and secondary schools.

== Career ==
Souza was educated at Columbia University and Harvard University. He spent his early years as a young professor and practitioner at the School of Planning and Architecture (SPA) in New Delhi. He also served as a United Nations consultant, won the national competition for the Goa High Court, and received a special honour from the Government of Portugal. His acclaimed works include Okhla Parish Church and Loretto Convent in New Delhi, his own house Altinho in Panjim, Goa, the Goa Assembly, and other World Bank-UNESCO projects. Souza had worked on projects in Sudan, Vietnam, Liberia, Republic of Cape Verde and the Republic of Guinea. He served as the Director of the School of Planning and Architecture from 1983 to 1988. In Goa, Souza had been critical of bureaucratic functioning and corruption in the system, where he won two competitions but was edged out of the same. His contemporaries were Charles Correa and Raj Rewal.

== Death ==
Souza died on 2 March 2025, at the age of 99.

== Legacy ==
The Ahmedabad-based CEPT University Archives had undertaken the archiving of Souza's collections digitally and also through Oral History Recordings. This archive included hand drawings, photographs, magazine articles and other related material from architect Souza's work.

== Personal views ==
Souza argued that the Goan capital of Panjim is "forgetting its past by trying to redesign open spaces". He had argued that the scenic capital "was a space of parks...."
