= 2025 India civil defence mock drill =

2025 security exercise

- Date: 7 May 2025
- Location: 244 districts, India
- Type: Nationwide civil defence exercise
- Organised by: Ministry of Home Affairs; National Disaster Management Authority

The 2025 India civil defence mock drill, code-named Operation Abhyaas, was a nationwide emergency preparedness exercise that took place on 7 May 2025 across 244 districts in India. Organized by the Ministry of Home Affairs (MHA) and coordinated by the National Disaster Management Authority (NDMA), the drill bolstered civilian readiness against potential hostile threats, particularly in response to escalating tensions with Pakistan following the Pahalgam attack on 22 April 2025, which resulted in the deaths of 26 civilians.

This large-scale exercise, the most extensive since the 1971 India-Pakistan war, involved activities such as air-raid siren tests, blackout simulations, evacuation drills, and public training sessions. Major cities including Delhi, Mumbai, Chennai, Kolkata, and Hyderabad participated, with specific measures like a 10-minute blackout in Bareilly, Uttar Pradesh, and drills at critical installations such as the Madras Atomic Power Station in Tamil Nadu.

In addition to these activities, Operation Abhyaas encompassed a wide array of coordinated efforts across various states to enhance emergency preparedness. In Delhi, the exercise took place at 55 locations spanning all 11 districts, with 60 air raid sirens activated at 4:00 PM to signal the commencement of the drill. This initiative mobilized thousands of personnel, including civil defence volunteers, police officers, and emergency responders, to simulate responses to potential hostile scenarios. Similarly, in Hyderabad, the mock drill occurred between 4:00 PM and 4:30 PM within the Outer Ring Road limits, engaging 12 civil defence services such as police, fire, rescue, medical, and municipal departments. Key sites—Secunderabad, Golconda Fort, Kanchan Bagh, and Nacharam—served as focal points, and citywide siren activations simulated air raid warnings.

The nationwide exercise also emphasized public awareness and participation. In Kerala, mock drills were conducted across all 14 districts, with the state government urging public cooperation and preparedness. Maharashtra saw extensive involvement, with drills in 16 cities—including Mumbai, Pune, and Nashik—extending down to the village level and involving civil defence volunteers, Home Guards, NCC, NSS, NYKS, as well as college and school students.

== Background ==
=== Escalating tensions following the Pahalgam terror attack ===
On 22 April 2025, a devastating terrorist attack occurred in the Baisaran Valley near Pahalgam, Anantnag district, in Indian-administered Jammu and Kashmir. Five militants armed with M4 carbines and AK-47s targeted a group of tourists, resulting in 26 fatalities and 17 injuries. The victims were primarily Hindu tourists, though a Christian tourist and a local Muslim were also among the casualties. The assailants, who wore military-style uniforms, separated the tourists based on their religion before opening fire. This incident was the deadliest attack on civilians in India since the 2008 Mumbai attacks.

The Resistance Front (TRF), an offshoot of the Lashkar-e-Taiba, initially claimed responsibility for the attack, citing opposition to non-local settlement in the region, but retracted their claim shortly thereafter. India accused Pakistan of supporting cross-border terrorism, a charge Islamabad denied. In response, India suspended the Indus Waters Treaty, expelled Pakistani diplomats, and closed borders and airspace. Pakistan retaliated by suspending the Simla Agreement, restricting trade, and closing its airspace to Indian airlines. Minor exchanges of fire were reported along the Line of Control, and both nations conducted missile test firings.

=== National Security Measures and Civil Defence Preparedness ===
In the wake of the Pahalgam attack, India initiated a series of national security measures to prepare for potential escalation. The Ministry of Home Affairs announced the nationwide emergency preparedness drill, code-named Operation Abhyaas, for 7 May 2025. This exercise aimed to strengthen India's readiness in the face of new and complex threats arising from heightened tensions with Pakistan.

The drill spanned 244 districts and included testing air raid sirens, readying bomb shelters, simulating blackouts, and training civilians in emergency response procedures. The Ministry of Home Affairs coordinated with various state and local agencies to ensure effective implementation. Prime Minister Narendra Modi and top security officials held high-level meetings to assess the situation and formulate appropriate countermeasures.

== Outcome ==
Operation Abhyaas was successfully executed across all 244 designated civil defence districts, testing air raid sirens, blackout simulations, evacuation drills, and public training exercises.

- In Delhi, 60 air raid sirens were activated across 55 locations, prompting coordinated evacuation rehearsals at landmarks such as Khan Market, Select Citywalk Mall, Chandni Chowk, and the NDMC building, with participation from over 1,000 personnel including police, civil defence volunteers, and emergency responders.
- In Pune, simulated bombing scenarios at six sites tested search-and-rescue coordination, casualty evacuation, and fire suppression operations, successfully assessing control room and communication link readiness.
- In Bengaluru, the Karnataka State Fire and Emergency Services, together with civil defence and medical teams, demonstrated coordinated rescue and medical aid procedures at the Fire and Emergency Services campus, simulating emergency casualty management.
- In Assam, mock drills conducted at 18 locations across 14 civil defence districts were concluded within half an hour, with Home Guard and Civil Defence Inspector General Arabinda Kalita noting successful testing of rescue capabilities and monitoring of time-bound operational parameters.

A 15-minute scheduled blackout in Delhi's NDMC area—from 8:00 PM to 8:15 PM—was executed smoothly, with power restored promptly and no major public complaints reported.

== See also ==
- Civil defense
- National Disaster Response Force
- National Institute of Disaster Management (India)
- 2025 Pahalgam attack
- 2025 India–Pakistan standoff
- Exercise TROPEX
