= Ramdas Ambatkar =

Indian politician (1960–2025)

Member of Maharashtra Legislative Council
- In office 22 June 2018 – 21 June 2024
- Preceded by: Mitesh Bhangdiya
- Constituency: Wardha-Chandrapur-Gadhchiroli Local Authorities

Personal details
- Born: 1 July 1960 Wadner Village, Hinganghat, Wardha District, Maharashtra
- Died: 30 April 2025 (aged 64) Chennai, Tamil Nadu, India
- Party: Bharatiya Janata Party (2004–2025)
- Parent: Unknown

Ramdas Bhagwanji Ambatkar (1 July 1960 – 30 April 2025) was an Indian politician belonging to the Bharatiya Janata Party. On 24 May 2018, he was elected to the Maharashtra Legislative Council by receiving 550 votes, beating his rival Indrakumar Saraf from Indian National Congress, who received 462 votes. Ambatkar died after a long illness in Chennai, on 30 April 2025, at the age of 64.
