= Syed Ali Ashrafi =

Indian politician (died 2025)

Syed Ali Ashrafi (died 25 March 2025) was an Indian politician and Islamic scholar belonging to the Sunni Islam. He was a Member of Uttar Pradesh Legislative Council from 1980 to 1985, and a Member of Uttar Pradesh Legislative Assembly from the Pilibhit Assembly constituency from 1985 to 1989. He was the last representative of Indian National Congress who served as an MLA of Pilibhit since 1985.

== Life and career ==
Syed Ali Ashrafi was born to Syed Mukhtar Ashraf Ashrafi at Ashrafpur Kichhauchha. He is a descendant of Ashraf Jahangir Semnani, a Sufi saint of Chishtiyya order.

Ashrafi died on 25 March 2025, and was buried in the Qabristan of Ashrafpur Kichhauchha on 26 March.
