= Mayor of Kediri =

- Wali Kota Kediri
- Coat of arms of Kediri

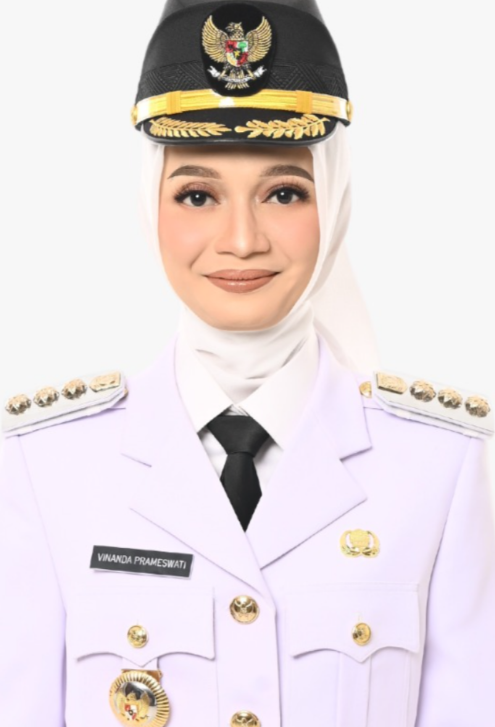
- Incumbent; Vinanda Prameswati since 20 February 2025
- Term length: 5 years
- Inaugural holder: L.K. Wennekendonk
- Formation: 1929
- Website: Official website

Mayor of Kediri is the head of the second-level region who holds the government in Kediri together with the Vice Mayor and 30 members of the Kediri City Regional House of Representatives. The mayor and vice mayor of Kediri are elected through general elections held every 5 years. The first mayor of Kediri was L.K. Wennekendonk, who governed the city period from 1929 to 1936.

== List ==
The following is a list of the names of the Mayors of Kediri from time to time.

Dutch East Indies Period
Num.	Portrait	Mayor	Beginning of office	End of Term	Political Party / Faction	Period	Note.	Vice mayor
1		Mr. L.K. Wennekendonk	1929	1936	Independent	1		N/A
2		J.G. Ruesink	1936	1940	Independent	2		N/A
3		M. Scheltema	1940	1941	Independent	3		N/A
4		Dr. J.R. Lette	1941	1942	Independent	4		N/A
Mayor of Kediri
Num.	Portrait	Mayor	Beginning of office	End of Term	Political Party / Faction	Period	Note.	Vice mayor
1		R. Soeprapto	1945	1950	Independent	5		N/A
2		R. Dwidjo Soemarto	1950	1955	Independent	6		N/A
2		R. Dwidjo Soemarto	1955	1960	Independent	7		N/A
3		R. Soedjono	1960	1966	Independent	8		N/A
4		Hartojo	1966	1968	Independent	9		N/A
5		Anwar Zainudin	1968	1973	Independent	10		N/A
6		Drs. Soedarmanto	1973	1978	Independent	11		N/A
7		Drs. Setijono	1978	1989	Independent	12		N/A
7		Drs. Setijono	1978	1989	Independent	13		N/A
8		Drs. Wijoto	1989	1994	Independent	14		N/A
8		Drs. Wijoto	1994	1999	Independent	15		N/A
9		Drs. H. Achmad Maschut	1999	2004	Independent	16		N/A
9		Drs. H. Achmad Maschut	2004	2009	Independent	17		Bambang Edianto
10		dr. H. Samsul Ashar; Sp.PD.	2 April 2009	2 April 2014	Independent	18 (2008)		Abdullah Abu Bakar; S.E.
11		Abdullah Abu Bakar; S.E.	2 April 2014	2 April 2019	PAN	19 (2013)		Lilik Nining Muhibbah; S.Sos. I., M.Pd.I. (2014–2020)
11		Abdullah Abu Bakar; S.E.	29 April 2019	2 November 2023	PAN	20 (2018)		Lilik Nining Muhibbah; S.Sos. I., M.Pd.I. (2014–2020)
12		Vinanda Prameswati; S.H., M.Kn.	20 February 2025	Incumbent	Golkar	21 (2024)		K. H. Qowimuddin Thoha; S.H.

== Temporary replacement ==
In the government stack, a regional head who submits himself to leave or temporarily resigns from his position to the central government, then the Minister of Home Affairs prepares a replacement who is a bureaucrat in the regional government or even a vice mayor, including when the mayor's position is in a transition period.

Portrait	Mayor	Party	Beginning	End	Duration	Period	Definitive	Ref.
	Jumadi (Temporary Acting)	Independent	15 February 2018	23 June 2018	128 days	19 (2013)	Abdullah Abu Bakar	(Note: Mayor Abdullah Abu Bakar and Vice Mayor Lilik Nining Muhibbah took campaign leave for the 2018 Kediri mayoral election from 15 February 2018 to 23 June 2018, the position of mayor was temporarily held by Temporary Acting Mayor Jumadi.)
	Budwi Sunu (Daily executive)	Independent	2 April 2019	29 April 2019	27 days	–	Transition (2019)	
	Zanariah (Acting)	Independent	3 November 2023	19 February 2025	1 year, 108 days	–	Transition (2023–2025)	

== See also ==
- Kediri
- List of incumbent regional heads and deputy regional heads in East Java
