= 2024 Kediri mayoral election =

- 27 November 2024
- Turnout: 80.34%
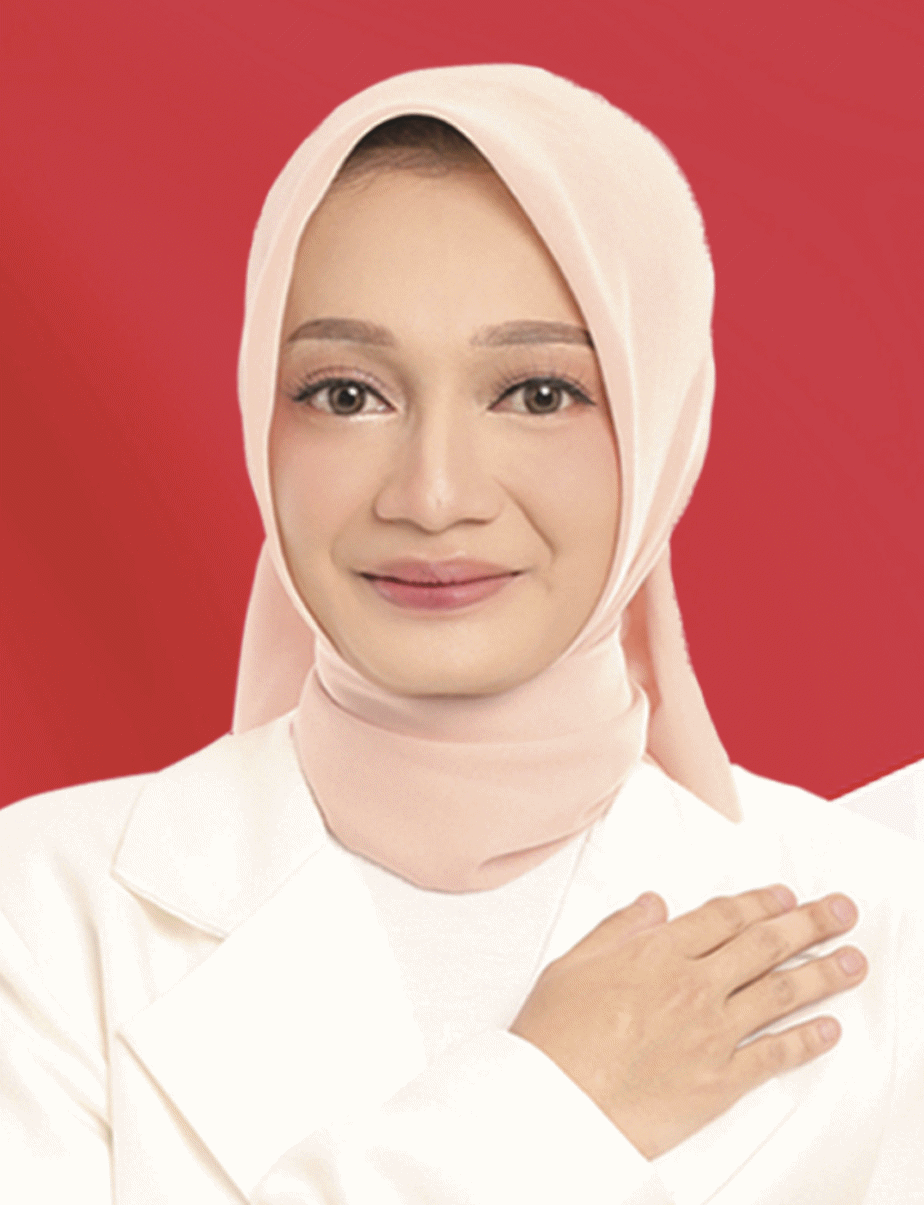

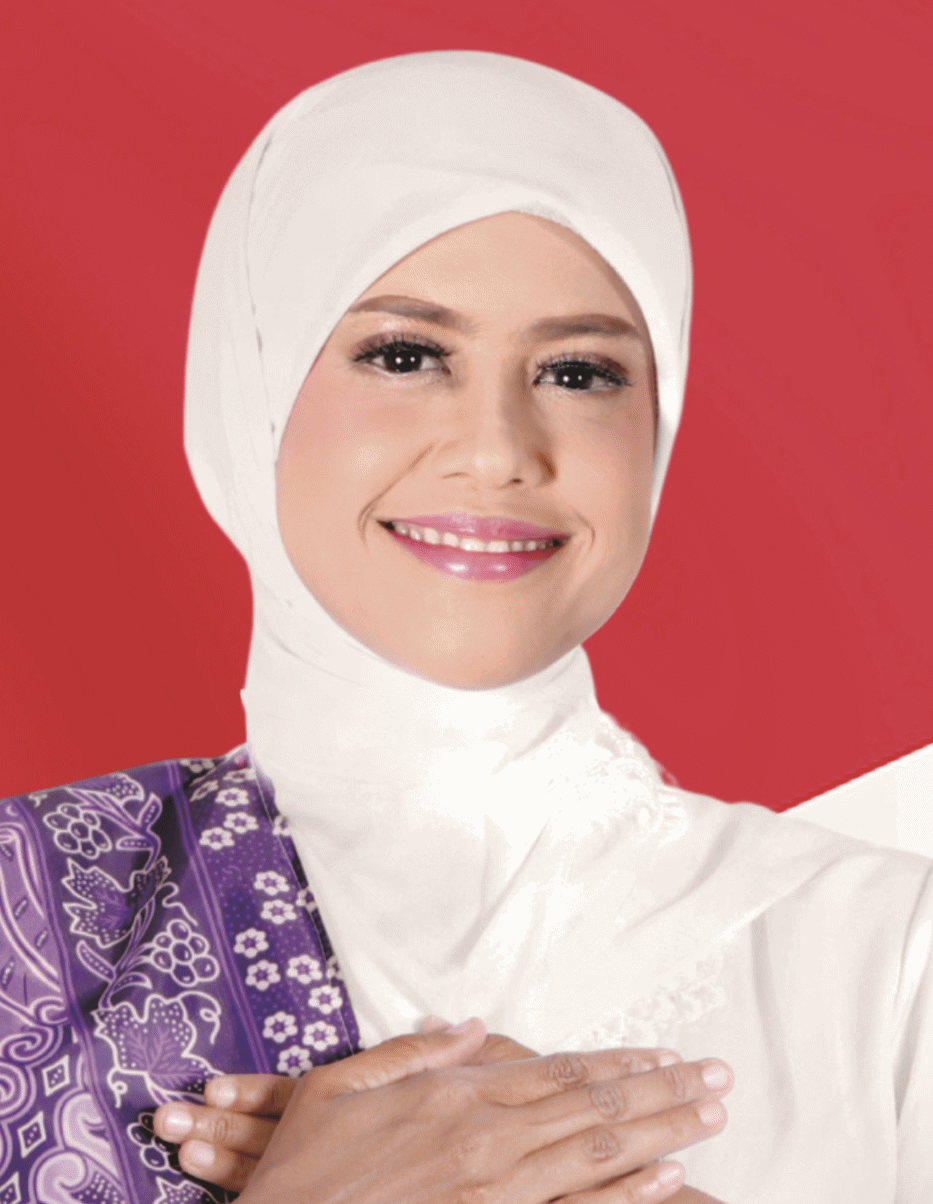
Candidate	Vinanda Prameswati	Ferry Silviana Feronica
Party	Golkar	PAN
Running mate	Qowimuddin Thoha	Regina Nadya Suwono
Popular vote	98,205	74,615
Percentage	56.83%	43.17%
Mayor before election
Zanariah (acting)
Independent
Elected mayor
Vinanda Prameswati
Golkar

The 2024 Kediri mayoral election was held on 27 November 2024 as part of nationwide local elections to elect the mayor and vice mayor of Kediri, East Java for a five-year term. The previous election was held in 2018. Vinanda Prameswati, the Golkar candidate, won the election with 56% of the vote, becoming the youngest elected mayor in the 2024 local election cycle. Her sole opponent, Ferry Silviana Feronica of the National Mandate Party (PAN), received 43%.

== Electoral system ==
The election, like other local elections in 2024, followed the first-past-the-post system where the candidate with the most votes wins the election, even if they do not win a majority. It is possible for a candidate to run uncontested, in which case the candidate is still required to win a majority of votes "against" an "empty box" option. Should the candidate fail to do so, the election will be repeated on a later date.

On 19 September 2024, Kediri City's General Elections Commission (KPU) announced that there would be 222,265 eligible voters in the election, with 405 polling stations across the city. The election's budget was Rp 29.8 billion (~USD 1.9 million), nearly double the cost of the previous election in 2018, due to an increase in payments to election workers.

== Candidates ==
The previously elected mayor Abdullah Abu Bakar had served two terms and was ineligible to run. He had resigned from his office in 2023 to run in the 2024 legislative election.

One of the candidates, Vinanda Prameswati, is a 26-year old notarial law graduate of Airlangga University and deputy chairman of Kediri's Golkar branch with no prior government experience. She is the daughter of a provincial police official, and had led a local Kediri-based pro-Joko Widodo group. Her running mate, Qowimuddin Thoha, is headmaster of a pesantren in Kediri. The ticket was endorsed by a wide coalition of political parties, including Golkar, Demokrat, PKB, PDI-P, Gerindra, and Hanura.

The other candidate, Ferry Silviana Feronica, is Abdullah Abu Bakar's wife. Her running mate, 28 year-old Regina Nadya Suwono, was formerly a PDI-P member of the Kediri City Council, the youngest city councillor in the 2019–2024 period. Ferry and Regina received the endorsements of NasDem Party and the National Mandate Party.

== Campaign ==
Two rounds of public debates were held between the candidate pairs on 1 and 20 November 2024.

== Results ==
Candidate	Running mate	Candidate party	Votes	%
Vinanda Prameswati	Qowimuddin Thoha	Golkar	98,205	56.83
Ferry Silviana Feronica	Regina Nadya Suwono	National Mandate Party	74,615	43.17
Total			172,820	100.00
Valid votes			172,820	96.78
Invalid/blank votes			5,756	3.22
Total votes			178,576	100.00
Registered voters/turnout			222,265	80.34
Source: Kediri City KPU

Vinanda and Thoha won more votes in all of Kediri's three districts. The results were made official on 9 January 2025, with Vinanda and Thoha being sworn in on 20 February 2025.
