= Kediri curse =

Indonesian urban legend

The Kediri curse refers to an urban legend in Indonesia related to the city of Kediri. The legend claims that high-ranking state officials, such as presidents, would be struck by misfortune shortly after visiting the city of Kediri. Origins of the curse have been attributed to historic Javanese monarchies based in the city, such as the Kalingga or the Kediri kingdoms. The removals of three Indonesian presidents – Sukarno, B. J. Habibie, and Abdurrahman Wahid – have been attributed to the curse.

== History ==
The origins of the curse have been attributed to King Kartikea Singha of the 6th-century Kalingga kingdom, who wrote an early Javanese law code and cursed malicious rulers of Java. Alternatively, the curse has also been attributed to the 12th-century King Jayabaya of the Kediri kingdom, who was believed to possess supernatural powers which could override the power of visiting rulers. The 19th-century Babad Kadhiri claimed that rulers of Kediri would win battles should they fight outside of Kediri but would lose when fighting in Kediri, and this has been interpreted to apply to Indonesian Presidents – that their political opponents would attack and defeat them should they visit Kediri.

Historical events associated with the curse included the final fall of the Majapahit Empire (centered in Kediri in its final years) and the Trunojoyo rebellion (based in Kediri).

== Cases ==
Three Indonesian presidents have been cited as victims to the Kediri curse: Sukarno, Abdurrahman Wahid, and B. J. Habibie. Sukarno had visited Kediri several times throughout his presidency, his last visit being in 1965, and was forced to abdicate following the 30 September movement that year. Wahid visited Kediri in December 1999 to open a Nahdlatul Ulama congress, and was impeached by the People's Consultative Assembly in 2001. Habibie, who visited the city in 1999 to inaugurate a sugar factory, ended his term as president three months later, although it was due to him deciding not to take part in the 1999 presidential contest.

Throughout his 32-year presidency, Suharto was widely reported to have never visited Kediri, although he did visit the city in the 1980s with Sultan of Yogyakarta Hamengkubuwono IX (who died shortly after the visit). 5th president Megawati Sukarnoputri and 7th president Joko Widodo also never visited the city in their 3-year and 10-year tenures, with Kediri-born cabinet secretary Pramono Anung jokingly referring to the curse during a 2020 visit to Kediri. None of the presidential candidates in the 2024 election campaigned in person in Kediri.

Sixth president Susilo Bambang Yudhoyono visited Kediri twice during his tenure, in 2007 and 2014, and did not experience significant "misfortune" associated with his visit. Kediri culturalist Imam Mubarok remarked that Yudhoyono did not cross the Brantas River and remained in Kediri's eastern half during his visit, and claimed that the "curse" only applied to the older, western half of Kediri.

== See also ==
- Curse of Tippecanoe
