= Hanji =

Hanji may refer to:

- Korean paper (한지; hanji)
- Hanji (film), a 2011 South Korean drama film
- Hàn-jī (漢字): writing system of Hokkien language

== See also ==
- 漢字 (disambiguation)
