= Vinanda Prameswati =

Indonesian politician (born 1998)

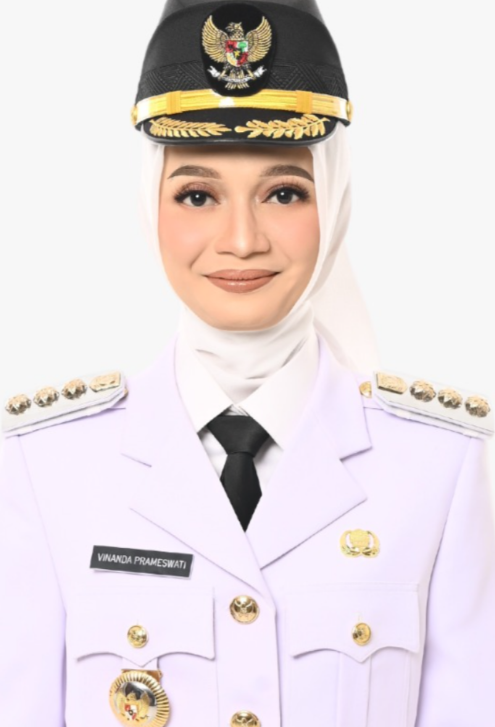
- 2025 portrait as mayor

12th Mayor of Kediri
- Incumbent
- Assumed office 20 February 2025
- Governor: Khofifah Indar Parawansa
- Deputy: Qowimuddin Thoha
- Preceded by: Abdullah Abu Bakar; Zanariah (act.)

Personal details
- Born: 12 June 1998 (age 27) Surabaya, East Java, Indonesia
- Party: Golkar

Vinanda Prameswati (born 12 June 1998) is an Indonesian politician of the Golkar party who is the mayor of Kediri, serving since February 2025. As of the 2025–2030 term, she is the youngest sitting regional leader in Indonesia.

== Early life and education ==
Vinanda Prameswati was born in Surabaya on 12 June 1998 as the eldest child of four siblings. Her parents are Edy Herwiyanto and Siskawati. Prameswati's father Herwiyanto is a police official in East Java's provincial police department. Prameswati was initially educated at state-funded schools in Kediri, graduating from SMA Negeri 3 Kediri before studying law at Brawijaya University (bachelor's in 2020) and notary law at Airlangga University (master's in 2023).

She undertook internships at the Indonesian National Land Agency and at a notary's office in 2023–2024.

== Career ==
Prameswati became head of the Relawan Suket Teki Nusantara, the social arm of a Joko Widodo-supporting organization, in Kediri City. She also became deputy chairman of Golkar's Kediri branch. In April 2024, she announced her intent to run in Kediri's 2024 mayoral election, registering with the Democratic Party. Qowimuddin Thoha ("Gus Qowim") became her running mate, and the pair eventually secured the support of seven political parties represented in Kediri's DPRD: Democratic, PDI-P, Golkar, Gerindra, PKB, PKS, and Hanura, in addition to the non-DPRD parties PSI and PPP. Prameswati and Thoha won the election with 98,205 votes (56.8%), defeating Ferry Silviana Feronica–Regina Nadya Suwono.

They were sworn in as mayor and vice mayor on 20 February 2025, and Prameswati became the youngest sitting regional leader in Indonesia at the age of 26. As her first hundred days program, she announced that the city government would provide additional funding to local small businesses, RT/RW and Quran reading teachers. In May 2025, she announced the expansion of civil registration services to local kelurahan and kecamatan offices.

Political offices
Preceded by Abdullah Abu Bakar	Mayor of Kediri; 2025–present	Incumbent
