= Wijoto =

Indonesian politician

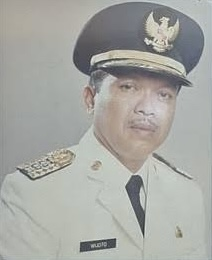

Mayor of Kediri
- In office 1989–1999
- Preceded by: Setijono
- Succeeded by: Achmad Maschut

Personal details
- Born: 1938 or 1939
- Died: March 2025 (aged 86)

Wijoto (1938/1939 – March 2025) was an Indonesian politician who served as the mayor of Kediri between 1989 and 1999.

During his term as mayor, Wijoto led improvements to Kediri's water drainage systems, leading to a reduction of flooding in the city which had previously been routinely flooded by runoff from Mount Kelud. This improvement led the city to win an Adipura cleanliness award. Wijoto also promoted the national family planning program, reducing the city's population growth rate by around half. For this, he received the Satyalencana Wira Karya award from Suharto in June 1993.

Late in his term, Wijoto mediated a major strike of Gudang Garam factory workers in Kediri demanding increased salaries and improved working conditions with the backdrop of the Asian financial crisis.

He died in March 2025 at the age of 86, and was buried at the Keputih Public Cemetery in Surabaya.
