= Kediri City Regional House of Representatives =

Unicameral legislature of the Indonesian city of Kediri

Kediri City Regional House of Representatives Dewan Perwakilan Rakyat Daerah Kota Kediri
- 2024–2029 period

Type
- Type: Unicameral

History
- Founded: 1950
- New session started: 21 August 2024

Leadership
- Speaker: Firdaus, PAN since 10 October 2024
- Deputy Speaker: Sudjono Teguh Widjaja, Golkar since 10 October 2024
- Deputy Speaker: M. Yasin, NasDem since 10 October 2024

Structure
- Seats: 30
- Political groups: Government (21): Golkar (5); Gerindra (4); PDI-P (3); PKB (3); PKS (2); Hanura (2); Democratic (2); Opposition (9): PAN (5); NasDem (4)
- Length of term: 5 years

Elections
- Voting system: Open list proportional representation
- Last election: 14 February 2024

Meeting place
- Kediri City Regional House of Representatives Building; Mayor Bismo Street Number 21; Semampir, Kota, Kediri; East Java, Indonesia

The Kediri City Regional House of Representatives (Indonesian: Dewan Perwakilan Rakyat Daerah Kota Kediri, DPRD Kota Kediri) is the unicameral municipal legislature of Kediri, East Java, Indonesia. It has 30 members, who are elected every five years, simultaneously with the national legislative election.

== Legal basis ==
The legislature for Kediri was formed along with those of other cities in East Java under Law Number 16 of 1950, which organized city governments within the province.

== General election results ==
=== 2024 Indonesian legislative election ===
The official valid votes received by political parties contesting the 2024 Indonesian legislative election in each electoral district (constituency) for members of the Kediri City Regional House of Representatives are as follows.

2024 Indonesian legislative election results

Electoral district	PKB	Gerindra	PDI-P	Golkar	NasDem	Labour	Gelora	PKS	PKN	Hanura	Garuda	PAN	PBB	Democratic	PSI	Perindo	PPP	Ummat	Valid votes
Kediri City 1	4,597	6,822	8,025	4,733	6,300	0	86	4,034	97	4,917	23	10,244	23	2,620	1,386	113	160	213	54,393
Kediri City 2	5,951	4,531	4,932	11,257	7,788	0	57	3,079	63	468	25	10,364	60	5,271	788	44	1,776	103	56,557
Kediri City 3	7,069	12,243	8,063	9,960	11,591	0	266	4,699	56	3,999	120	5,862	78	4,555	789	55	236	300	69,941
Total	17,617	23,596	21,020	25,950	25,679	0	409	11,812	216	9,384	168	26,470	161	12,446	2,963	212	2,172	616	180,891
Source: General Elections Commission of Indonesia

== Composition ==
The following is the composition of members of the Kediri City Regional House of Representatives in the last five periods.

Party	Term of period				
Party	2004–2009	2009–2014	2014–2019	2019–2024	2024–2029
PKB seats	9	▼4	4	▼3	3
Gerindra seats		1	▲3	▲4	4
PDI-P seats	8	▼5	▼4	▲5	▼3
Golkar seats	4	▼3	3	▼2	▲5
NasDem seats			1	▲3	▲4
PKS seats	1	1	▲3	▼2	2
Hanura seats		2	2	2	2
PAN seats	3	▲4	▲6	▼5	5
PBB seats	0	▲1	▼0	0	0
Democratic seats	3	3	▼2	▲3	▼2
PPP seats	1	1	▲2	▼1	▼0
PDS seats	1	1			
PKPB seats	0	▲1			
PKNU seats		3			
Total Seats	30	30	30	30	30
Total Party	8	▲13	▼10	10	▼9

== Electoral District ==
In the 2019 Legislative Election and the 2024 Legislative Election, the Kediri City Regional House of Representatives election was divided into 3 electoral districts as follows:

Electoral District Name	Electoral District Area	Number of Seats
KEDIRI CITY 1	Kota	9
KEDIRI CITY 2	Pesantren	9
KEDIRI CITY 3	Mojoroto	12
TOTAL		30

== See also ==
- East Java Regional House of Representatives
- Kediri
- East Java
