= 漢字 =

漢字 refer to Chinese characters, the logograms used to write various languages of the Sinosphere, as part of the Chinese family of scripts:

- Written Chinese
- Kanji in Japanese
- Hanja in Korean
- Chữ Hán in Vietnamese
