= Achmad Maschut =

Indonesian politician (1940–2021)

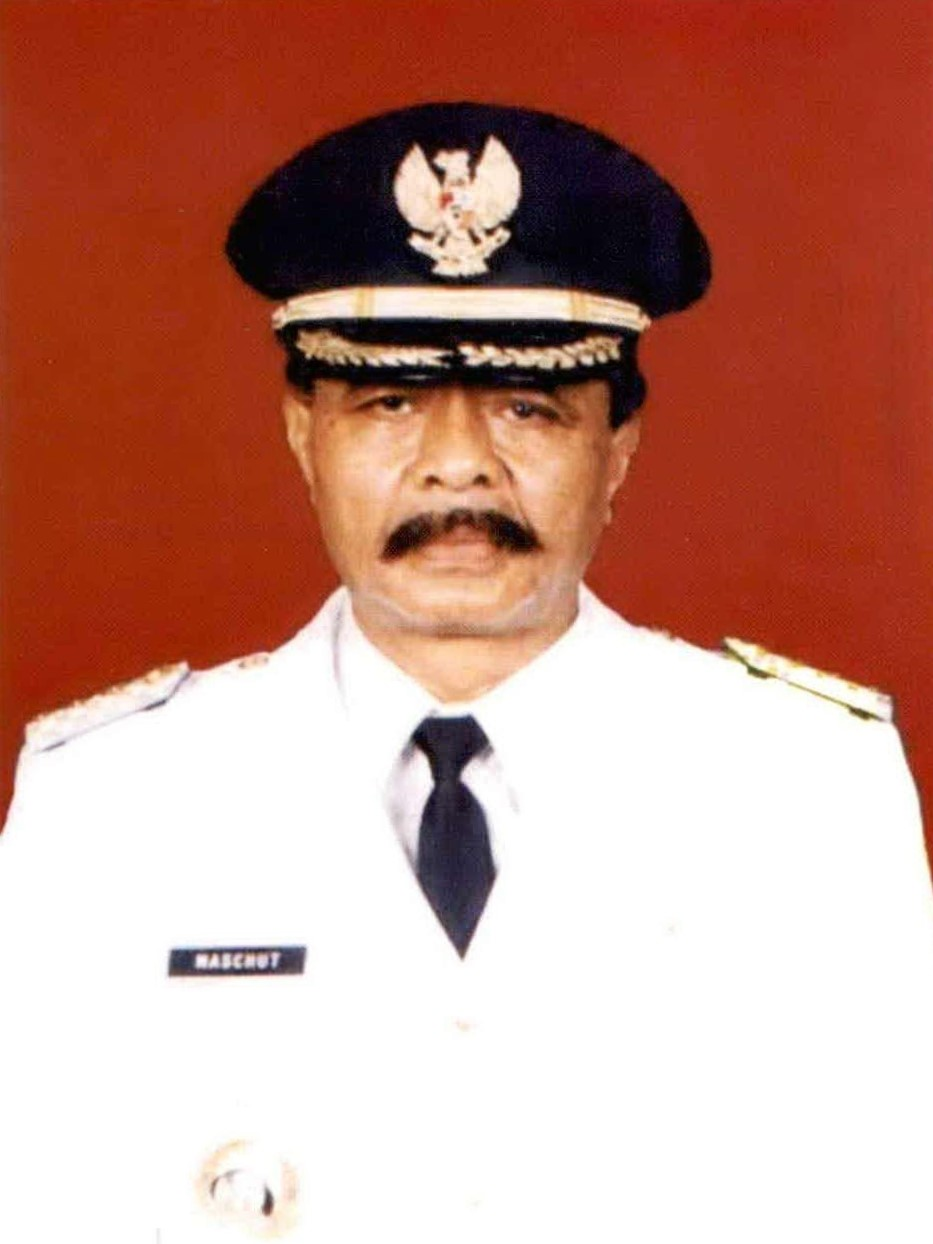
- Maschut in 1999

Mayor of Kediri
- In office 1999–2009
- Preceded by: Wijoto
- Succeeded by: Samsul Ashar

Personal details
- Born: 15 February 1940; Malang, East Java, Indonesia
- Died: 25 August 2021 (aged 81); Malang, East Java, Indonesia

Achmad Maschut (15 February 1940 – 25 August 2021) was an Indonesian politician and bureaucrat who served as the mayor of Kediri, East Java between 1999 and 2009.

== Early life ==
Achmad Maschut was born on 15 February 1940 in Malang. He spent his childhood and was educated there, eventually studying economics at Brawijaya University.

== Career ==
Between 1992 and 1997, Maschut served as the city secretary of Malang.

On 5 March 1998, Kediri's city council elected Maschut as mayor of Kediri, with former Kediri city secretary Bambang Edianto elected as his vice mayor. During his first term, Maschut made outreach efforts to Kediri's cultural and religious communities, and they were eventually invited to the city council meeting which reelected Maschut in 2003.

Starting in 2002, Maschut initiated a cultural ceremony of throwing offerings into the Brantas River, replicating practices done by the Javanese monarchies in Yogyakarta and Surakarta. In one ceremony, a 60-meter long stage on the Brantas' bank was constructed where a continuous cultural showing was done for 30 hours. Maschut was also known for his work with the city's football club Persik Kediri, which he managed during his tenure as mayor and won two Liga Indonesia cups in 2003 and 2006. After the club's 2003 victory, Maschut gave civil servant positions to key players in the team.

After the end of his tenure in Kediri, Maschut returned to his home in Malang. For a time, he was investigated as a suspect in a corruption case of Kediri's municipal employee insurance, but his involvement was not found and his suspect status was cleared in 2013.

== Personal life ==
He was married to Ni Ketut Sutji Setyawati. His son-in-law Iwan Budianto unsuccessfully ran in Kediri's 2008 mayoral election to succeed him. Maschut died on 25 August 2021 at the Dr Saiful Anwar Regional General Hospital in Malang due to an illness. He was buried at a public cemetery in Malang.
