= Samsul Ashar =

Indonesian physician and politician (1961–2022)

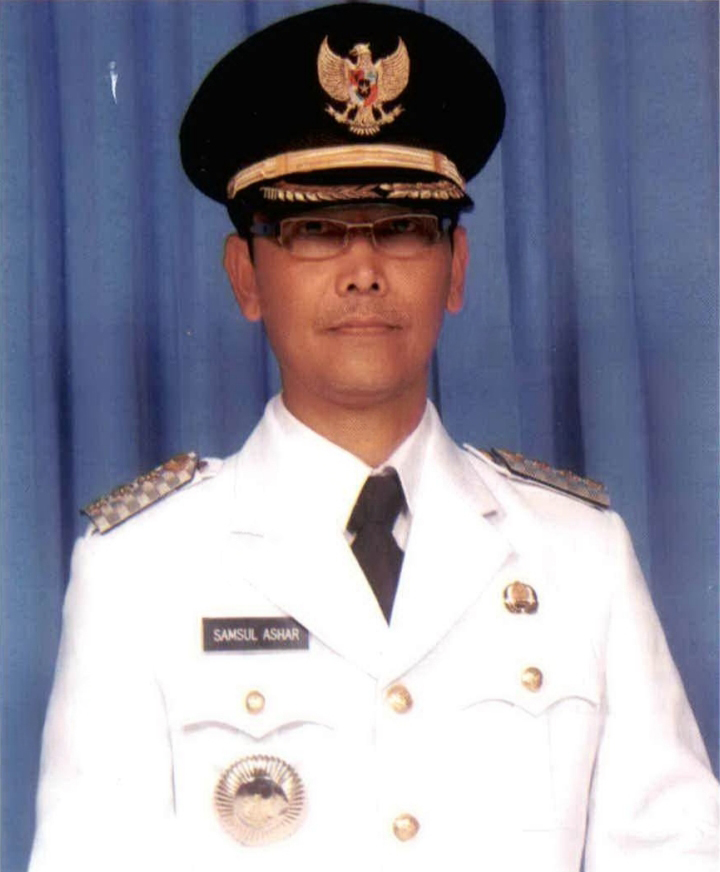
- Ashar in 2009

Mayor of Kediri
- In office 2 April 2009 – 2 April 2014
- Preceded by: Achmad Maschut
- Succeeded by: Abdullah Abu Bakar

Personal details
- Born: 16 September 1961 Kediri, East Java, Indonesia
- Died: 13 March 2022 (aged 60) Surabaya, East Java, Indonesia

Samsul Ashar (16 September 1961 – 13 March 2022) was an Indonesian physician and politician who served as the mayor of Kediri, East Java between 2009 and 2014. After the end of his mayoralship, he was sentenced in 2021 to prison for corruption related to a bridge's construction. Ashar died of cancer in 2022.

== Early life ==
Samsul Ashar was born in Kediri on 16 September 1961. He spent his childhood there, graduating from high school at Kediri's State High School No. 2 before studying medicine at Brawijaya University, graduating in 1989. He would later study internal medicine at Airlangga University.

== Career ==
In 1989, Ashar began to work as a government doctor, starting at a puskesmas in Aceh Besar Regency. He later moved back to Kediri where he worked at the city's hospitals. By 2004, he was elected chairman of Kediri's branch of the Indonesian Medical Association.

=== As mayor ===
When Kediri held its first direct mayoral election in 2008, Ashar ran with Abdullah Abu Bakar as running mate. With the endorsements of the National Mandate Party, the United Development Party, and the Prosperous Peace Party, the pair won with 136,279 votes (41.15%) in an eight-way race. They were sworn in as mayor and vice mayor on 2 April 2009. During his term as mayor, Ashar ordered the shutdown of the city's Semampir brothel area. A new public hospital was also opened during his tenure, along with the new Brawijaya Bridge crossing the Brantas River.

Aside from his mayoralship, Ashar also doubled as chairman of the city's football club Persik Kediri. In this capacity, he led a movement within the Football Association of Indonesia (PSSI) to boycott its leadership, although he rejected proposals to hold a competing congress to PSSI's leadership congress. Persik would conduct a corporate merger with Minangkabau FC during Ashar's chairmanship, the merger being done to fulfill PSSI's administrative requirements. When new Ministry of Home Affairs rules were issued prohibiting the use of municipal government funds in local football clubs, Ashar used personal funds obtained from pawning valuables to support Persik's finances.

In 2013, Ashar ran for reelection with his former deputy Abdullah running against him. In the election, Abdullah won 67,915 votes (51.6%) to Ashar's 63,784 (48.4%). Ashar filed a lawsuit to the Constitutional Court of Indonesia, claiming that vote buying (including Abdullah's campaign promise of a Rp 50 million annual stipend to each RT neighborhood) and intimidation occurred, but the lawsuit was rejected citing lack of evidence. Abdullah was sworn in to replace Ashar on 2 April 2014.

=== Later career and death ===
Ashar attempted to run for a second term again in Kediri's 2018 mayoral election, receiving the endorsement of PDI-P and Hanura. He again lost to Abdullah, with Ashar securing 32,749 votes (22.1%) to Abdullah's 85,528 (57.7%) in a three-way race.

In 2019, he was designated as a corruption suspect in the construction of the Brawijaya Bridge, with reported government losses of Rp 14 billion (USD 1 million). Although prosecutors sought a 12-year prison sentence, Ashar received a 4.5 year-sentence in 2021. It was later proven that the presiding judge had received a Rp 300 million bribe to give Ashar a lighter prison sentence, and the judge was fired by the Judicial Commission of Indonesia in 2023.

He died during early morning on 13 March 2022 at the Siloam Hospital of Surabaya due to cancer, and he was buried in Kediri later that day. He had received treatment his cancer for some time beforehand.

== Personal life ==
Ashar was married to Dahlia Ishaq, and the couple had three children.
