= Abdullah Abu Bakar =

Indonesian politician

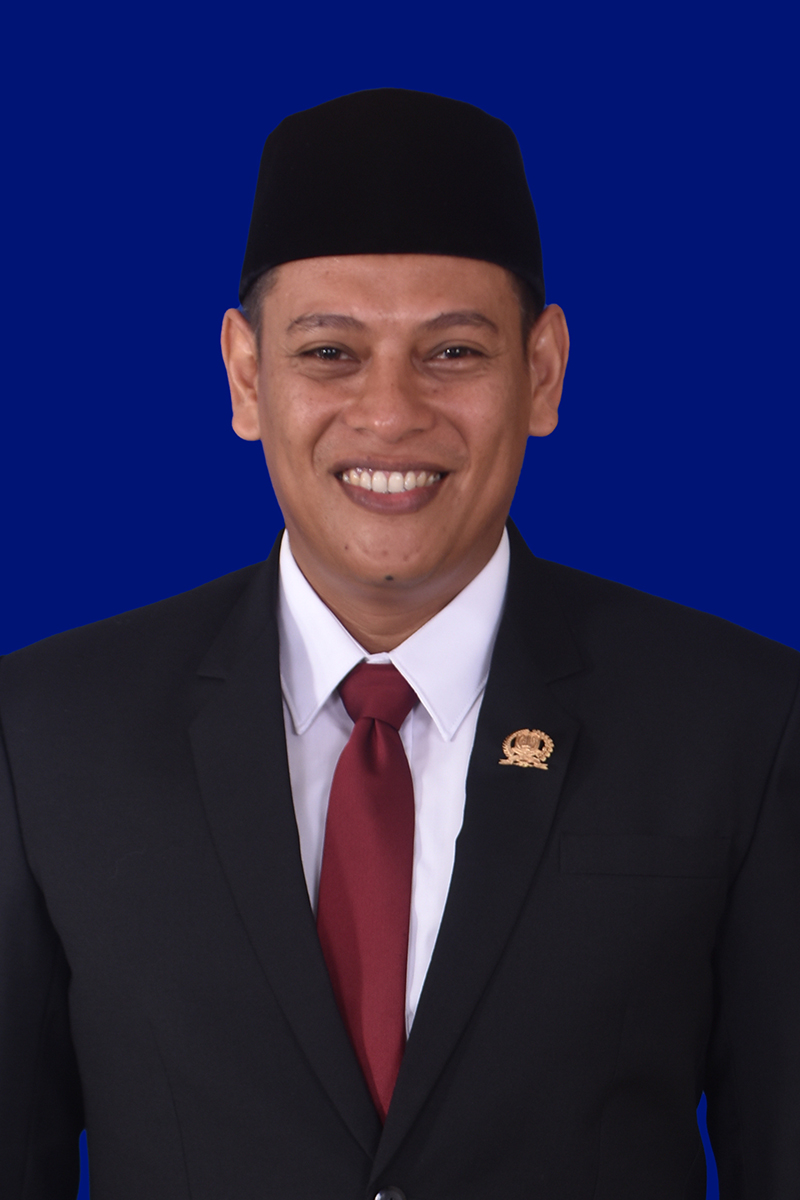
- Abdullah in 2024

Member of East Java DPRD
- Incumbent
- Assumed office 31 August 2024
- Constituency: 8th
- Majority: 166,320

Mayor of Kediri
- In office 2 April 2014 – 2 November 2023
- Preceded by: Samsul Ashar
- Succeeded by: Zanariah (act.); Vinanda Prameswati

Personal details
- Born: 12 April 1980 (age 45); Kediri, East Java, Indonesia
- Political party: National Mandate Party

Abdullah Abu Bakar (born 12 April 1980) is an Indonesian businessman and politician of the National Mandate Party. He is currently a member of the East Java Regional House of Representatives, serving since 2024, and had previously served as the mayor of Kediri between April 2014 and his resignation in November 2023. He had previously been the city's vice mayor between 2009 and 2014.

== Early life ==
Abdullah Abu Bakar was born in the city of Kediri on 12 April 1980. His parents are Abu Bakar Bagazi and Maryam. He briefly lived in Surakarta, Central Java as a child, but moved back to Kediri where he completed elementary school. He continued his education in Kediri, graduating from Kediri's State High School No. 1 before moving to Yogyakarta for study. He obtained a bachelor's in economics from STIE YKPN there. During his study in Yogyakarta, Abdullah worked as a freelance credit card marketer.

== Career ==
After completing his study, Abdullah started a photography business, focusing on weddings and other events. He also started a leather company to continue his family's business, gradually developing finished products for export to South Korea. In 2008, he entered politics as the running mate of Samsul Ashar in Kediri's mayoral race, and the pair was elected with 56,079 votes (41.15%). They were sworn in as mayor and vice-mayor on 2 April 2009.

=== Kediri mayor ===
In 2013, Abdullah opted to run as mayor in the city's election against Samsul Ashar. In the election, Abdullah who ran with Lilik Muhibbah won 67,915 votes (51.6%) to Ashar's 63,784. Ashar filed a lawsuit to the Constitutional Court of Indonesia, claiming that vote buying (including Abdullah's campaign promise of a Rp 50 million annual stipend to each RT neighborhood) and intimidation occurred, but the lawsuit was rejected citing lack of evidence. Abdullah and Muhibbah were sworn in as mayor and vice mayor on 2 April 2014. They would be reelected in 2018 after winning 85,528 votes (57.7%), defeating Ashar for a second time along with another challenger.

As mayor, Abdullah distributed his Rp 50 million per neighborhood campaign promise, which were primarily aimed at local small-scale infrastructure works in addition to social activities. By 2021, this allocation had been increased to Rp 100 million. In 2022, he announced a citywide service card program, intended to agglomerate various social programs related to the municipal government into a single system. In May 2023, he tendered his resignation as mayor in order to qualify to run in the 2024 Indonesian legislative election, and his resignation was accepted in August 2023 although he remained mayor until 2 November 2023.

=== DPRD ===
In the 2024 legislative election, Abdullah was elected as a member of the National Mandate Party representing the 8th district (Kediri and Kediri Regency), winning 166,320 votes – the highest in the district. He has called for the provincial government to crack down on illicit cigarette trade in the province to increase excise revenues.

== Personal life ==
He is married to Ferry Silviana Feronica, and the couple has four children. Feronica attempted to run as mayor to succeed her husband in 2024, but was defeated by Vinanda Prameswati.
