= Kediri (city) =

City in East Java, Indonesia

- City
- City of Kediri; Kota Kediri

Other transcription(s)
  - Javanese: Kutha Kadhiri (Gêdrig) ꦏꦸꦛꦏꦝꦶꦫꦶ (Hånåcåråkå) كوڟا كاڎيري (Pegon)
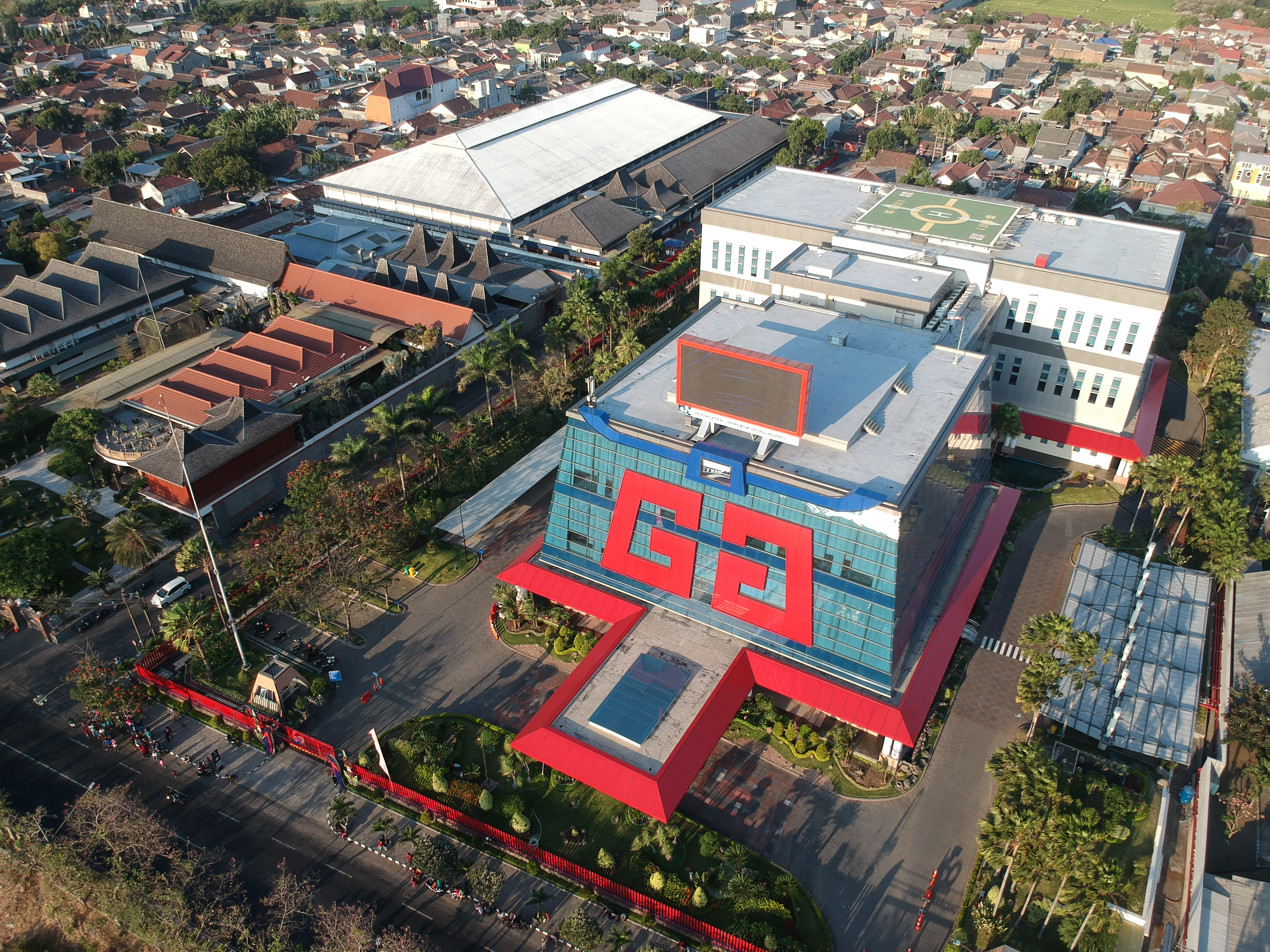
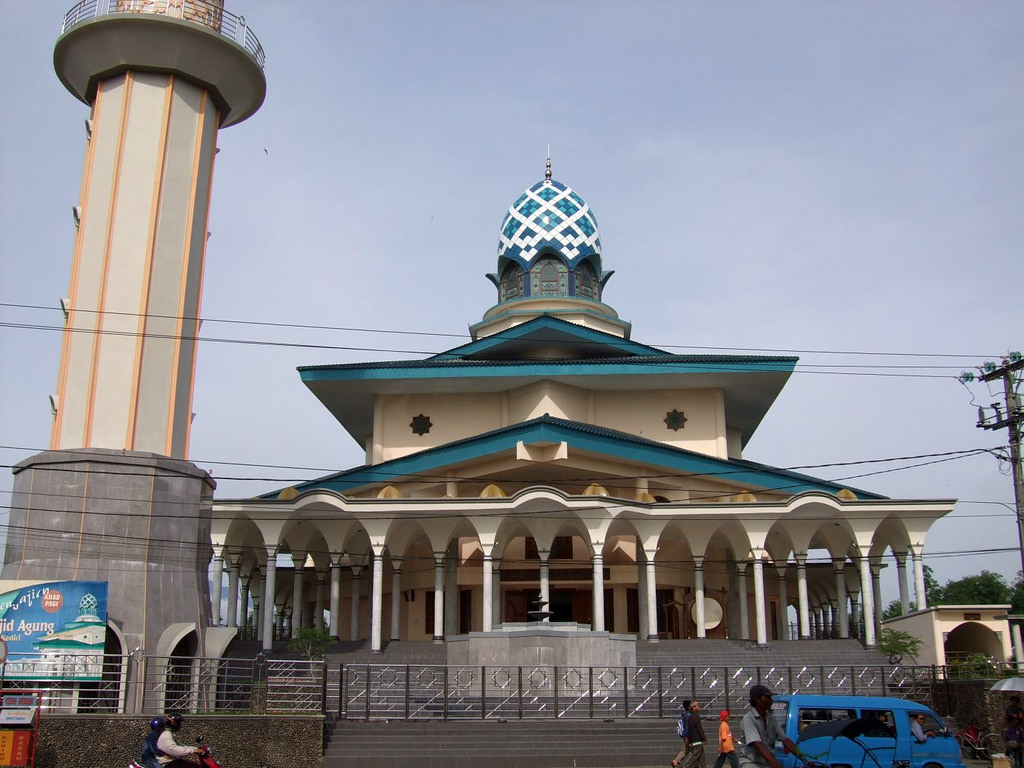
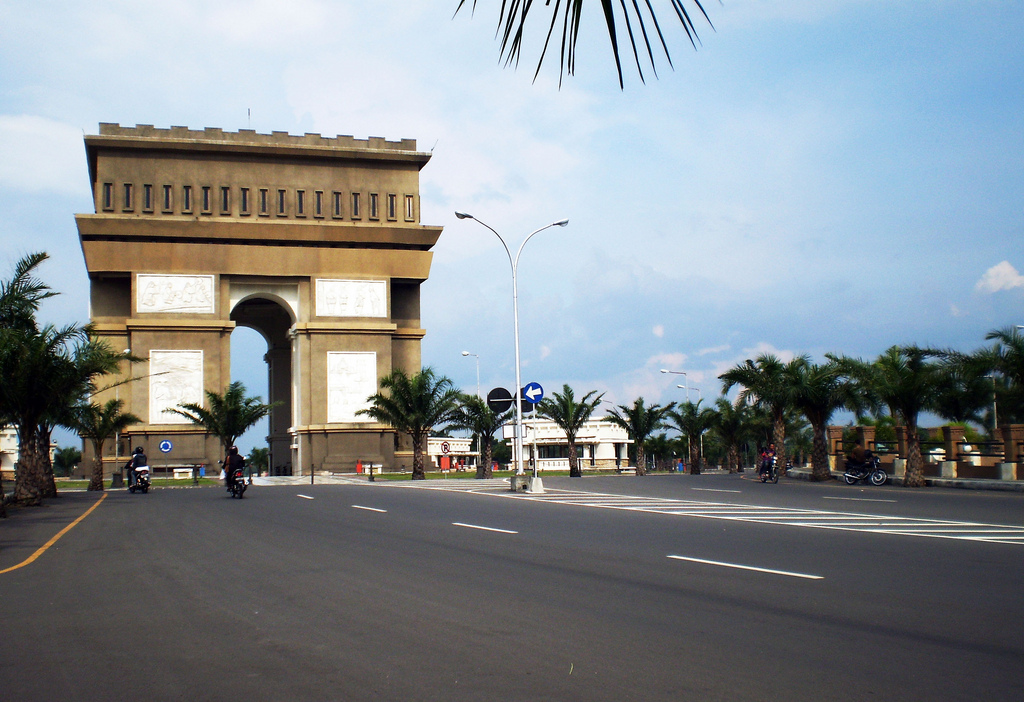
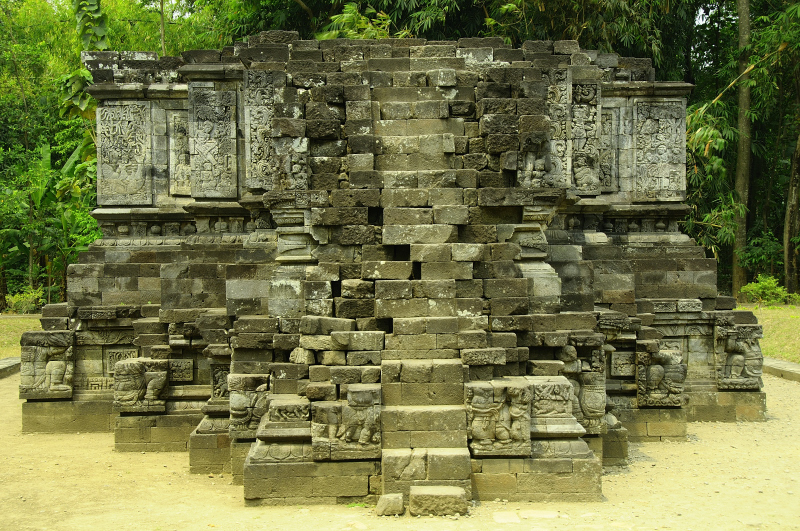
- Clockwise, from top left : Gudang Garam Headquarters, Grand Mosque of Kediri, Surowono Temple, Simpang Lima Gumul Monument

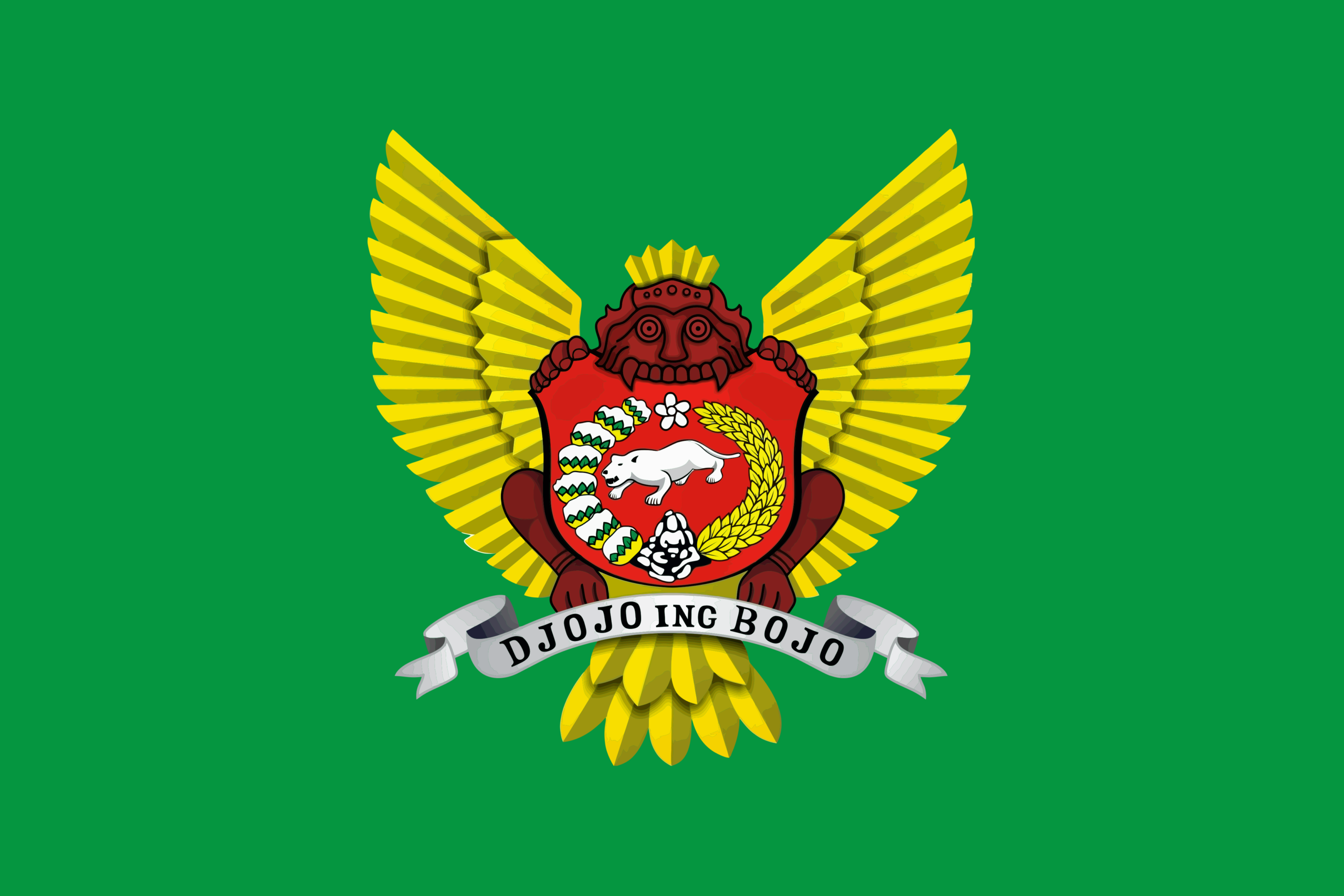
- Flag Coat of arms
- Nicknames: Kota Industri (City of Manufacture)
- Motto(s): Joyo ing Boyo (Javanese) ꦗꦺꦴꦪꦺꦴꦆꦁꦧꦺꦴꦪꦺꦴ (Triumphant against the catastrophe)
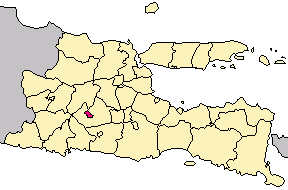
- Location within East Java

- Location in Java and Indonesia Kediri (Indonesia)
- Coordinates: 07°48′40″S 112°00′17″E
- Country: Indonesia
- Province: East Java
- Founded: 27 July 879

Government
  - Mayor: Vinanda Prameswati
  - Vice Regent: Qowimuddin Thoha

Area
  - Total: 67.23 km^{2} (25.96 sq mi)
- Elevation: 65 m (213 ft)

Population (mid 2025 estimate)
  - Total: 301,815
  - Density: 4,489/km^{2} (11,630/sq mi)
- Time zone: UTC+7 (IWST)
- Area code: (+62) 354
- Vehicle registration: AG
- HDI: ▲0.795; High (2022)
- Website: kedirikota.go.id

Kediri (Javanese: ꦏꦸꦛꦏꦝꦶꦫꦶ, Kutha Kadhiri, Javanese pronunciation: [ku.ʈa kə.d̪i.ri]) is a city, located near the Brantas River in the province of East Java on the island of Java in Indonesia. It covers an area of 67.23 km^{2} and had a population of 268,950 at the 2010 Census and 286,796 at the 2020 Census; the official estimate as of mid 2025 was 301,815 (comprising 149,851 males and 151,964 females).

It is one of two 'Daerah Tingkat II' (second level of administration) that have the name 'Kediri'; the other is the Regency of Kediri (Kabupaten Kediri), which geographically surrounds the city but is administratively separate from it, although it was formerly the regency's capital. The city's urbanised area extends beyond the city limits into the regency, notably into Ngasem District north of the city, and had 445,344 residents in 1990, making it the third most populous urban area in East Java after Surabaya and Malang.

Archaeological artefacts discovered in 2007 appeared to indicate that the region around Kediri may have been the location of the Kediri Kingdom, a Hindu kingdom in the 11th century.

The city is a major trade centre for the Indonesian sugar and cigarette industry. Kediri is the second largest city by economy in East Java, after Surabaya, with a 2016 estimated GDP at Rp76.95 trillion.

== History ==
Traditionally, the city of Kediri is said to have been founded on 27 July 879, and today the city's anniversary is celebrated on that date. The Brantas River valley was known as the site of classical Javanese culture, particularly between the 10th and 15th centuries. The town of Kediri was established by King Airlangga on the banks of the upper Brantas River in 1042. It was originally called Dahanapura or Daha. After the death of Airlangga his kingdom was divided into two parts: the kingdom of Panjalu in the west, and the kingdom of Janggala in the east. Daha became the capital of Panjalu, and later the capital of the Kediri kingdom. Over the centuries, control of the city passed to the Singhasari, Majapahit, Demak and Mataram kingdoms.

The name "Kediri", or "Kadiri", is derived from the Sanskrit word Khadri, meaning Indian Mulberry, indicative of the mulberry trees (locally known as pacé or mengkudu) which grew in the area.

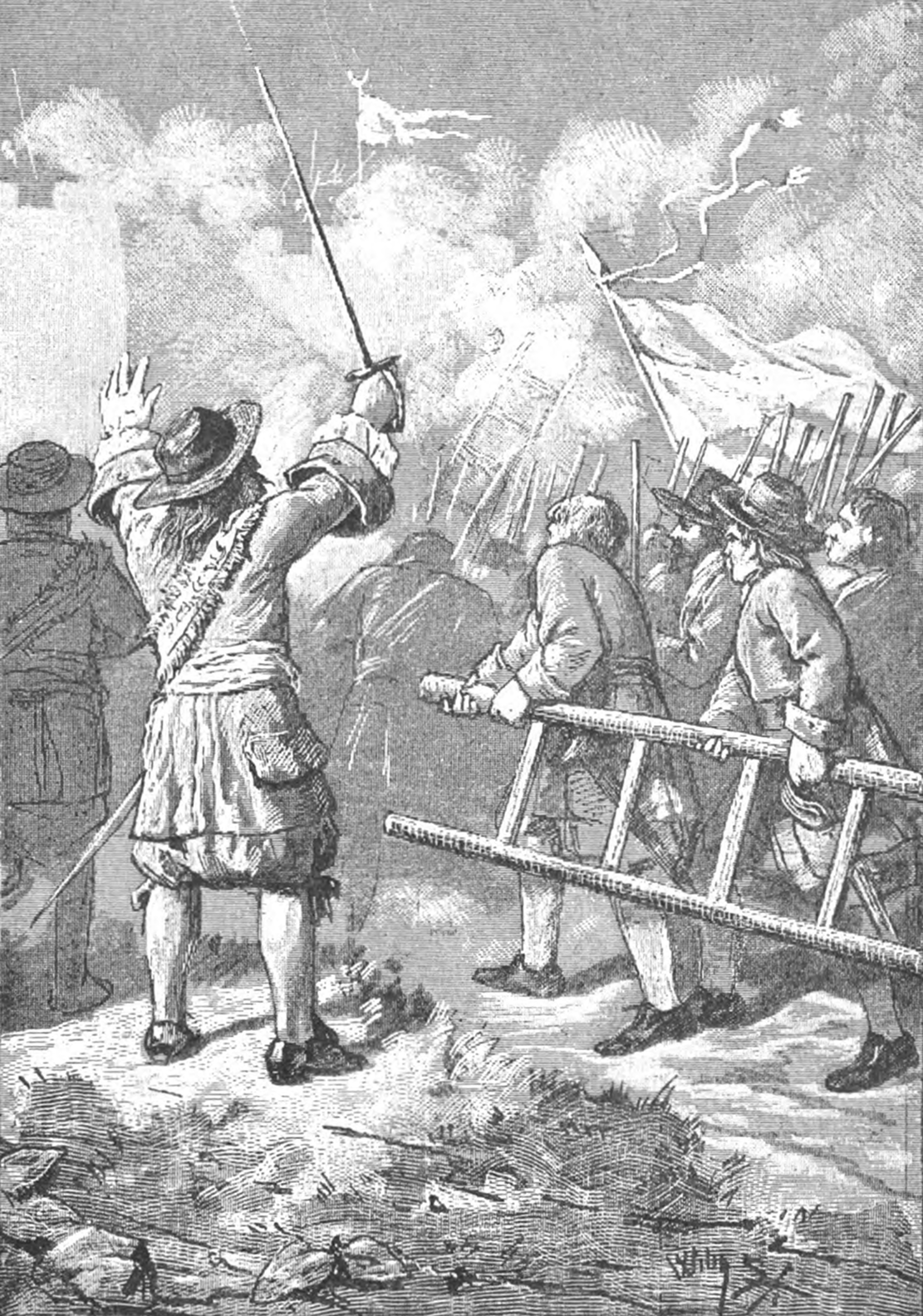
VOC troops storming Kediri – then the capital of Trunajaya – in 1678 during the Trunajaya War. Depicted in an 1890 Dutch children's novel.

After the era of the Javanese kingdoms, Kediri went into decline, becoming a small rural settlement, which was later annexed by the Dutch East India Company (VOC) as part of the Dutch conquest of Java. East Java in the 1740s was controlled by Cakraningrat IV, a Madurese regent who was favorably disposed toward the VOC, as he believed the Dutch would help him in securing the independence of Madura from the Kasunanan Kartasura kingdom. However, when his plans were rejected by the VOC, Cakraningrat rise against the Europeans. The rebellion was ultimately suppressed by the VOC, assisted by two generals sent by Pakubuwana II, Sunan Kartasura. Kediri then became part of the VOC and remained under Dutch control until the independence of Indonesia in 1945.

Kediri began to flourish when the Dutch East Indies founded the autonomous Gemeente Kediri in 1906. Zelfstanding Gemeenteschap (self-government with full autonomy) was granted in 1928.

During the Indonesian National Revolution in 1945–1949, Kediri became a target of General Sudirman's guerrilla campaign. Kediri suffered terrible bloodshed during the Indonesian mass killings of 1965–66 after the failed 30 September Movement coup. One estimate suggests that around 13% of Kediri's population or 22,000 people were killed during the Indonesian mass killings of 1965-66.

The Gudang Garam kretek tobacco industry was established in 1958 by Chinese Indonesian Tjoa Ing Hwie. He purchased vast lands in Kediri and established a kretek cigar factory. Today, Gudang Garam is the major employer of the city, with more than 40,000 workers.

== Administrative districts ==
The city of Kediri is divided into three districts (kecamatan), tabulated below with their areas and their population totals from the 2010 Census and the 2020 Census, together with the official estimates as of mid 2025. The table also includes the locations of the district administrative centres, the number of administrative villages or subdistricts (urban kelurahan) in each district, and its postal codes.

Kode Wilayah	Name of District (kecamatan)	Area in km^{2}	Pop'n Census 2010	Pop'n Census 2020	Pop'n Estimate mid 2025	Admin centre	No. of subdistricts	Post codes
35.71.01	Mojoroto	26.95	108,369	114,553	117,610	Bandar Lor	14	64111 - 64119
35.71.02	Kota (Kediri)	15.96	81,803	84,291	91,053	Banjaran	17	64121 - 64129
35.71.03	Pesantren	24.33	78,335	87,952	93,152	Bangsal	15	64131 - 64139
	Totals	67.23	268,507	286,796	301,815	Kota	46	

The names of the kelurahan in each district area:

- Mojoroto District: Bandar Kidul, Bandar Lor, Banjarmlati, Bujel, Campurejo, Dermo, Gayam, Lirboyo, Mojoroto, Mrican, Ngampel, Pojok, Sukorame, Tamanan.
- Kota District: Balowerti, Banjaran, Dandangan, Jagalan, Kaliombo, Kampungdalem, Kemasan, Manisrenggo, Ngadirejo, Ngronggo, Pakelan, Pocanan, Rejomulyo, Ringinanom, Semampir, Setonogedong, Setonopande.
- Pesantren District: Banaran, Bangsal, Betet, Bawang, Blabak, Burengan, Jamsaren, Ketami, Ngletih, Pakunden, Pesantren, Singonegaran, Tempurejo, Tinalan, Tosaren.

== Society and culture ==
Being the site of an ancient capital of Javanese kingdoms, the city is one of the major cultural centres for Javanese people, the city also contains some ancient ruins and candis that date back to the era of the Kediri and Majapahit Kingdom.

The city's ancient history has led to the emergence of an urban myth claiming that Indonesian presidents will be struck by misfortune should they visit the city.

=== Sport ===
Kediri is the home of Persik Kediri, which plays in the Premier Division of the Indonesian Football League. Persik Kediri has won a total of two titles of the Premier Division of Indonesian Football League, last occurring in 2006.

=== Education ===
Kediri city has Three National Universities, they are Universitas Brawijaya (branch III Kediri), STAIN Kediri, and Politeknik Negeri Kediri. Kediri also has many private institutions for higher education, such as the Institut Ilmu Kesehatan Bhakti Wiyata, Universitas Nusantara PGRI Kediri, Universitas Kadiri, and Universitas Islam Kadiri.

=== Tourism ===
The city of Kediri hardly has any natural attractions for a tourist destination. A few amusement parks are present, e.g. Paggora Amusement Park, Tirtayasa Water Park, Selomangleng Water Park. Selomangleng Cave is a man-made cave, allegedly used by the princess Dewi Kilisuci to meditate, according to folk tales. A few shopping centres are also built in the city, such as Golden Swalayan, and Kediri Mall. Along with the older shopping district Jalan Dhoho they serve the population of Kediri (both the city and the regency) and the surrounding areas.

== List of mayors ==
In 1906 Kediri was given the status of a gemeente, along with its gemeenteraad. The head was an assistent-resident. In 1929 its status was changed to stadsgemeente with a burgemeester as its head. With the Act no. 16 Year 1950, Kediri is given the status of City (Kota Besar or Kota Madya) with a mayor (walikota) within Indonesian administrative structure

=== Dutch East-Indies Era ===
- Mr. L.K. Wennekendonk (1929–1936)
- J.G. Ruesink (1936–1940)
- M. Scheltema (1940–1941)
- Dr. J.R. Lette (1941–1942)

=== Indonesian Era ===
- R. Soeprapto (1945–1950)
- R. Dwidjo Soemarto (1950–1960)
- R. Soedjono (1960–1966)
- Hartojo (1966–1968)
- Anwar Zainuddin (1968–1973)
- Drs. Soedarmanto (1973–1978)
- Drs. Setijono (1978–1989)
- Wijoto (1989–1999)
- Achmad Maschut (1999–2009)
- Samsul Ashar (2009–2014)
- Abdullah Abu Bakar (2014–2023)
- Vinanda Prameswati (2025–present)

== Climate ==
Kediri has a tropical savanna climate (Köppen Aw) with moderate to little rainfall from June to October and heavy rainfall from November to May.

Climate data for Kediri
Month	Jan	Feb	Mar	Apr	May	Jun	Jul	Aug	Sep	Oct	Nov	Dec	Year
Mean daily maximum °C (°F)	29.5 (85.1)	29.6 (85.3)	29.9 (85.8)	30.5 (86.9)	30.7 (87.3)	30.8 (87.4)	30.7 (87.3)	31.4 (88.5)	32.2 (90.0)	32.3 (90.1)	31.4 (88.5)	30.2 (86.4)	30.8 (87.4)
Daily mean °C (°F)	25.5 (77.9)	25.6 (78.1)	25.7 (78.3)	26.0 (78.8)	25.9 (78.6)	25.5 (77.9)	25.0 (77.0)	25.4 (77.7)	26.2 (79.2)	26.6 (79.9)	26.4 (79.5)	25.8 (78.4)	25.8 (78.4)
Mean daily minimum °C (°F)	21.5 (70.7)	21.6 (70.9)	21.6 (70.9)	21.6 (70.9)	21.1 (70.0)	20.2 (68.4)	19.4 (66.9)	19.5 (67.1)	20.2 (68.4)	21.0 (69.8)	21.4 (70.5)	21.5 (70.7)	20.9 (69.6)
Average rainfall mm (inches)	324 (12.8)	314 (12.4)	316 (12.4)	206 (8.1)	134 (5.3)	41 (1.6)	39 (1.5)	23 (0.9)	27 (1.1)	52 (2.0)	136 (5.4)	274 (10.8)	1,886 (74.3)
Source: Climate-Data.org

== Notable people from Kediri ==
- Susilo Wonowidjojo, an Indonesian billionaire businessman and owner of Gudang Garam
- Pramono Anung, Cabinet Secretary of the Working Cabinet in 2015 - 2019, The Onward Indonesia Cabinet in 2019 - 2024 and Governor of Jakarta since in 2025.
- Anthony Fokker, Dutch aviation pioneer and aircraft manufacturer
- Maarten Paes, Indonesian footballer who currently plays for FC Dallas, his maternal grandmother was born in Kediri.
- Nadeo Argawinata, Indonesian footballer who currently plays for Bali United.

== See also ==
- Kediri Regency
