= Deaths in July 2025 =

The following is a list of notable deaths in July 2025.

Entries for each day are listed alphabetically by surname. A typical entry lists information in the following sequence:

- Name, age, country of citizenship at birth, subsequent country of citizenship (if applicable), reason for notability, cause of death (if known), and reference.

== July 2025 ==
=== 1 ===
- Patrizia Arnaboldi, 78, Italian politician, deputy (1987–1992).
- Joxe Azurmendi, 84, Spanish writer, philosopher and poet.
- Renato Baretić, 62, Croatian author, journalist, and actor.
- Samuel Bigler, 78, American Olympic weightlifter (1976), pancreatic cancer.
- Samuel G. Bonasso, 85, American businessman and civil engineer, complications from Parkinson's disease.
- Robert Bruce, 58, American racing driver, complications from a heart attack.
- Carlos Carnicero, 73, Spanish journalist and politician.
- Nikolay Chervenkov, 77, Moldovan activist.
- Sir Brian Clarke, 71, British painter, architectural artist and printmaker.
- Florence Delay, 84, French writer and actress (The Trial of Joan of Arc, Le Jouet criminel, Écoute voir), member of the Académie Française.
- Alex Delvecchio, 93, Canadian Hall of Fame ice hockey player (Detroit Red Wings), Stanley Cup champion (1952, 1954, 1955).
- Yuriy Dubrovnyi, 71, Ukrainian football player (Karpaty Lviv, SC Lutsk) and coach (Hazovyk Komarno).
- Michel Evdokimov, 94, French theologian and Russian Orthodox priest.
- Brian M. Fagan, 88, British archaeologist and anthropologist.
- Roger Goldsworthy, 95, Australian politician, deputy premier of South Australia (1979–1982).
- Hamdan ATT, 79, Indonesian dangdut singer.
- Scott Haring, 67, American game designer (Car Wars), complications from dementia and pneumonia.
- Rinus Israël, 83, Dutch football player (Feyenoord, national team) and manager (Feyenoord).
- Dragan Jevtović, 65, Serbian politician, MP (1991–1993).
- Dennis Lattimer, 79, New Zealand muralist.
- Mihai Leu, 56, Romanian boxer (Dinamo București) and rally driver (Romanian Rally Championship).
- David Lipsey, Baron Lipsey, 77, British journalist and life peer (since 1999).
- Max McAlary, 95, Australian Olympic wrestler (1964).
- Werner Meißner, 88, German economist, president of the Goethe University Frankfurt (1994–2000).
- Carl Frederick Mengeling, 94, American Roman Catholic prelate, bishop of Lansing (1996–2008).
- Marco Onado, 84, Italian economist.
- Dieter Planck, 80, German archaeologist.
- Edith Raim, 59–60, German historian.
- Jerry Ruth, 87, American drag racer.
- Asahi Sakano, 19, Japanese ski jumper, fall.
- David Schwartzman, 81, American geologist, cancer.
- Rudy Silbaugh, 94, American politician, member of the Wisconsin State Assembly (1990–1996).
- Jimmy Swaggart, 90, American evangelist, founder of Jimmy Swaggart Ministries, complications from cardiac arrest.
- Ken Walker, 101, British-born Canadian physician and writer.
- Badr Al-Yaqoub, 79, Kuwaiti politician.
- Ahmed Zahzah, 91, Algerian footballer (USM Blida).

=== 2 ===
- Jim Allen, 73, Montserratian cricketer (Leeward Islands).
- Juan Álvarez, 77, Mexican Olympic footballer (1972).
- Jean-François Borel, 91, Belgian microbiologist and immunologist.
- Walter Bradley, 81, American engineer.
- Terry Brown, 67-68, New Zealand brothel owner. (death announced on this date)
- Sheila Cameron, 91, British lawyer, Dean of the Arches (2001–2009).
- Kevin Crowley, 90, Irish friar.
- Roger Dupuy, 91, French historian and academic.
- Shekhar Dutt, 79, Indian civil servant, defence secretary (2005–2007) and governor of Chhattisgarh (2010–2014).
- David O. Dykes, 72, American Baptist minister.
- Mikhail Gudkov, 42, Russian military commander, deputy head of the Russian Navy (since 2025), airstrike.
- Gerald Harper, 96, English actor (Hadleigh, Adam Adamant Lives!, A Night to Remember).
- John C. Harris, 81, American horse breeder, owner of Harris Ranch.
- Sophia Hutchins, 29, American talent manager, charity executive, and television personality (I Am Cait), traffic collision.
- Trefor Jenkins, 92, South African human geneticist.
- Neal Justin, 89, American politician and professor, member of the Arizona House of Representatives (1965–1966).
- Laurent Kupferman, 59, French essayist and author, drug overdose.
- Sven Lindahl, 88, Swedish journalist, songwriter and radio presenter (Svensktoppen).
- Douglas Loeffler, 93, American politician, member of the Florida House of Representatives (1961–1964).
- Julian McMahon, 56, Australian actor (Nip/Tuck, Fantastic Four, Home and Away), cancer.
- Diana McVeagh, 98, British music author.
- Agliberto Meléndez, 82, Dominican film director (One Way Ticket).
- Babu Meman, 73, Zimbabwean cricketer (Shropshire, national team).
- Odvar Omland, 101, Norwegian politician, MP (1977–1981).
- Anna Ornstein, 98, Hungarian-American Holocaust survivor.
- Sergio Páez Verdugo, 92, Chilean politician, senator (1990–2006) and deputy (1969–1973).
- Bob Ralston, 87, American pianist and organist (The Lawrence Welk Show).
- Verité Reily Collins, 86, British businesswoman.
- Peter Shapiro, 55, American music journalist, cancer.
- Verka Siderova, 99, Bulgarian folk singer.
- Dan Siegel, 79, American lawyer.
- Richard Smart, 80, Australian viticulturist, cancer.
- Alan Teulon, 91, British chartered surveyor.
- Teresio Vachet, 78, Italian Olympic alpine skier (1968).
- Franck Verzy, 64, French Olympic high jumper (1984).
- David Fenwick Wilson, 95, American-born Canadian organist.
- Ram Ayodhya Prasad Yadav, 72, Nepali politician, MP (2013–2017), kidney disease.

=== 3 ===
- Rae Anstee, 92, Australian nurse.
- Francis Bell, 82, American politician, member of the South Carolina Senate (1983–1984).
- Ray Blake, 71, English Catholic priest and religious blogger.
- Ralph Burke, 65, American politician.
- Querobina Carvalho, 65, Indian comedian and actress.
- Chung Pui-lam, 84, Hong Kong politician, MLC (1985–1991).
- Alain Douville, 75, French footballer (Saint-Lô, Caen).
- Enriqueta Duarte, 96, Argentine Olympic swimmer (1948).
- Zelig Eshhar, 84, Israeli immunologist.
- Borja Gómez, 20, Spanish motorcycle racer (FIM Stock European Championship), race practice collision.
- László Horváth, 79, Hungarian modern pentathlete, Olympic silver medallist (1980).
- Billy Hunter, 97, American baseball player (St. Louis Browns, Baltimore Orioles) and manager (Texas Rangers).
- Diogo Jota, 28, Portuguese footballer (Wolverhampton Wanderers, Liverpool, national team), traffic collision.
- André Silva, 25, Portuguese footballer (Penafiel), traffic collision.
- Klára Kolouchová, 46, Czech mountaineer, fall.
- Anita Kupsch, 85, German actress (Escape from East Berlin, One or the Other of Us, Praxis Bülowbogen).
- Dany Lademacher, 75, Belgian guitarist (Herman Brood and his Wild Romance, Vitesse, The Radios).
- Peter Ledden, 81, English cricketer (Sussex).
- Eduardo Liendo, 84, Venezuelan writer and scholar.
- Tormod Lislerud, 85, Norwegian discus thrower.
- Trevor Lloyd, 73, Australian footballer (Fitzroy).
- David Mabuza, 64, South African politician, deputy president (2018–2023), premier of Mpumalanga (2009–2018), and MNA (2018–2023).
- Mickey MacConnell, 77–78, Irish musician and songwriter.
- Michael Madsen, 67, American actor (Reservoir Dogs, Kill Bill, Donnie Brasco), heart failure.
- Jacques Marinelli, 99, French racing cyclist.
- Din Mohammad, 104, Pakistani wrestler, Asian Games gold medalist (1954).
- John Parkes, 74, Australian Anglican clergyman, bishop of Wangaratta (2008–2019).
- Manolis Pilavov, 61, Ukrainian separatist and politician, mayor of Luhansk (2014–2023), explosion.
- Earl Pilgrim, 86, Canadian author.
- Peter Rufai, 61, Nigerian footballer (Farense, Stationery Stores, national team).
- Tetiana Sheliha, 76, Ukrainian actress.
- Lolit Solis, 78, Filipino talk show host and talent manager, kidney disease.
- Suet Nei, 77, Hong Kong actress (Old Time Buddy: To Catch a Thief, At the Threshold of an Era, To Catch the Uncatchable), pancreatic cancer.
- Stephen Vaughan Sr., 62, English football club owner (Barrow, Chester City) and convicted criminal. (death announced on this date)

=== 4 ===
- Arturo Alcoceba, 72, Spanish political activist.
- Andrei Badalov, 62, Russian engineer (Transneft).
- Joan Braderman, 75, American video artist (Joan Does Dynasty, The Heretics).
- Lyndon Byers, 61, Canadian ice hockey player (Boston Bruins, San Jose Sharks) and radio host (WAAF-FM).
- Chow Chung, 92, Hong Kong actor (Old Time Buddy: To Catch a Thief, Point of No Return), pneumonia.
- Munishwar Chandar Dawar, 79, Indian physician.
- José Díaz, 93, Uruguayan lawyer and politician, minister of the interior (2005–2007).
- Michael Dinwiddie, 70, American playwright.
- José Antonio García Belaúnde, 77, Peruvian diplomat, minister of foreign affairs (2006–2011).
- Nihat Genç, 69, Turkish journalist and writer, lung cancer.
- Edward J. Giorgianni, 81, American imaging scientist.
- Donald Gray, 95, British priest.
- Richard Greenberg, 67, American playwright (Take Me Out, Eastern Standard, Three Days of Rain), cancer.
- Rob Houwer, 87, Dutch film producer (Turkish Delight, Soldier of Orange, The Fourth Man).
- Telésforo Isaac, 96, Dominican Episcopal prelate, bishop of Dominican Republic (1972–1991).
- Gordon Jago, 92, English football player (Charlton Athletic) and manager (Queens Park Rangers, Dallas Sidekicks).
- Luís Jardim, 75, Portuguese percussionist.
- Bobby Jenks, 44, American baseball player (Chicago White Sox, Boston Red Sox), World Series champion (2005), adenocarcinoma.
- Przemyslaw Jeziorski, 43, Polish academic (University of California) and economist, shot.
- David Killick, 86-87, British actor (The Crown, A Touch of Frost, Doctor Who).
- David McClain, 92, American politician.
- Rafael Peralta, 92, Spanish rejoneador.
- Ed Rombola, 88, American actor (Indians).
- Peter Russell-Clarke, 89, Australian chef and television personality (Come and Get It), complications from a stroke.
- Abdul Rahman Saleh, 84, Indonesian prosecutor and diplomat, attorney general (2004–2007).
- Lidia Semenova, 73, Ukrainian chess grandmaster.
- Mark Snow, 78, American film and television composer (The X-Files, Smallville, Blue Bloods), blood cancer.
- Beata Szymańska, 87, Polish poet, writer and philosopher.
- Ruzaika Al-Tarish, 71, Emirati actress and media personality.
- Christean Wagner, 82, German politician.
- Young Noble, 47, American rapper (Outlawz), suicide by gunshot.

=== 5 ===
- Pedro Aguayo, 85, Ecuadorian politician, vice president (1998).
- David Boger, 85, American-born Australian chemical engineer.
- Régis Bonvicino, 70, Brazilian poet, editor and critic.
- Yvonne Braid, 82, Australian politician.
- Mauro Del Vecchio, 79, Italian military officer and politician, commander of ISAF (2005–2006) and senator (2008–2013).
- Jake Epp, 85, Canadian politician, MP (1972–1993), minister of national health and welfare (1984–1989), minister of energy, mines and resources (1989–1993).
- J. Wade Gilley, 86, American academic, president of the University of Tennessee system (1999–2001) and Marshall University (1991–1999), Virginia secretary of education (1978–1982).
- Ida Golin, 65, Italian footballer (Modena, Lazio, national team).
- William Hoge, 79, American politician, member of the California State Assembly (1992–1996).
- A. T. M. Shamsul Huda, 81, Bangladeshi civil servant, chief election commissioner (2007–2012).
- Eli Kristiansen, 91, Norwegian politician, MP (1977–1981).
- Nicholas Maiale, 73, American politician, member of the Pennsylvania House of Representatives (1980–1993).
- Emilio Molinari, 85, Italian politician, MEP (1984–1985) and senator (1992–1994).
- Jonathan Ott, 76, American ethnobotanist, chemist and writer, co-creator of the term entheogen.
- Gordon Rorke, 87, Australian cricketer (New South Wales, national team), complications from surgery.
- John A. Sabatini, 79, American politician, member of the Rhode Island Senate (1981–1993).
- Haji Abdul Sattar, 74, Pakistani politician, MNA (2013–2018).
- Fred Silvester, 91, British politician, MP (1967–1970, 1974–1987).
- Anand Singh, 86, Indian politician, MP (1971–1977, 1980–1991) and twice Uttar Pradesh MLA.
- Yoshiomi Tamai, 90, Japanese philanthropist, founder of Ashinaga.
- Jean-Pierre Thorn, 78, French film director.
- Vinzenz Ziswiler, 90, Swiss zoologist.

=== 6 ===
- Andrea Bruno, 94, Italian architect.
- Sheila Colla, 43, Canadian conservation biologist, mesothelioma.
- Jan Engsmyr, 80, Norwegian politician.
- Ed Fiori, 72, American golfer, cancer.
- Jan Górecki, 90, Polish economist.
- Simon Groot, 90, Dutch agronomist, World Food Prize laureate (2019).
- Harald Groth, 82, German politician, member of the Landtag of Lower Saxony (1986–2003).
- Franz Hodjak, 80, German writer.
- Ossi Huber, 70, Austrian singer-songwriter, musician, and author.
- Jenny Jochens, 97, Danish-born American historian.
- Ian Khan, 65, British racing driver.
- Venanzio Nocchi, 79, Italian politician, senator (1987–1994).
- Álamo Oliveira, 80, Portuguese poet and writer.
- Graham Ricketts, 85, English footballer (Doncaster Rovers, Peterborough United, Stockport County).
- Irene Rodrian, 87, German writer and screenwriter.
- Bob Stouthuysen, 96, Belgian businessman.
- Sun Ying, 88, Chinese politician, governor of Gansu (1996–1998).
- Helena Tattermuschová, 92, Czech operatic soprano (National Theatre).
- Luis Valoy, 67, Argentine footballer (Sarmiento, Atlético Tucumán).
- Louis Yinda, 85, Cameroonian businessman.

=== 7 ===
- Tamara Abdushukurova, 84, Tajik actress, theater director and politician.
- Vladimir Begma, 84, Russian artist.
- Edward Carmines, 79, American political scientist.
- Juan Cutillas, 83, Spanish football player (Atletico Madrid) and manager (Kaya, Philippines).
- Siva Shakthi Datta, 92, Indian film director (Chandrahas), screenwriter (Janaki Ramudu), and lyricist (Sye).
- Wayne Dobson, 68, English magician, complications from multiple sclerosis.
- Seán Doherty, 79, Irish Gaelic footballer (Dublin).
- Ray Godkin, 90, Australian sports administrator.
- Oscar Jorge, 88, Argentine politician, governor of La Pampa Province (2007–2015) and mayor of Santa Rosa, La Pampa (1991–2003).
- Sabine Klamroth, 91, German lawyer and author.
- Ernest Kumi, 40, Ghanaian politician, MP (since 2025).
- Dieter Kuprella, 79, German Olympic basketball player (1972).
- Miguel Ángel López, 83, Argentine football player (Independiente, national team) and manager (Club América).
- Edward Lucyk, 82, American politician, member of the Pennsylvania House of Representatives (1981–2002).
- Olivier Marleix, 54, French politician, MP (since 2012), suicide by hanging.
- J. Heinrich Matthaei, 96, German biochemist (Nirenberg and Matthaei experiment).
- Aprem Mooken, 85, Indian Chaldean Syrian prelate, metropolitan of the church (since 1968).
- Pettis Norman, 86, American football player (Dallas Cowboys, San Diego Chargers).
- Owolabi Olakulehin, 90, Nigerian traditional ruler, Olubadan (since 2024).
- C. S. Radhadevi, 94, Indian playback singer.
- Gábor A. Somorjai, 90, Hungarian-American academic.
- Roman Starovoyt, 53, Russian politician, governor of Kursk Oblast (2019–2024), minister of transport (2024–2025), suicide by gunshot.
- Bernd Strasser, 89, German Olympic water polo player (1960).
- Norman Tebbit, Baron Tebbit, 94, British politician, secretary of state for employment (1981–1983), MP (1970–1992) and member of the House of Lords (1992–2022).
- Jewel Thais-Williams, 86, American activist and dance bar owner (Jewel's Catch One).
- Bradman Weerakoon, 94, Sri Lankan civil servant.

=== 8 ===
- Ernesto Agard, 88, Panamanian Olympic basketball player (1968).
- Peggy Beckett-Rinker, 81, American politician.
- Steve Benson, 71, American editorial cartoonist (Arizona Republic, Arizona Mirror), complications from a stroke.
- Władysław Bobowski, 93, Polish Roman Catholic prelate, auxiliary bishop of Tarnów (1974–2010).
- Frans Brouw, 96, Belgian-born Canadian pianist.
- James Carter Cathcart, 71, American voice actor (Pokémon, Yu-Gi-Oh! Duel Monsters, Sonic X), throat cancer.
- Roger Christiansen, 72, American television director (Hannah Montana, The Haunted Hathaways, Drake & Josh).
- Paul Collowald, 102, French civil servant and journalist.
- Suso Díaz, 80, Spanish trade unionist.
- Edward D. DiPrete, 91, American politician and convicted criminal, mayor of Cranston (1978–1985) and governor of Rhode Island (1985–1991).
- Christian Dorche, 78, French rally driver.
- Lars Englund, 92, Swedish sculptor and painter.
- David Flebotte, 65, American television writer and producer (Desperate Housewives, 8 Simple Rules, Masters of Sex), cystic fibrosis.
- Delwyn Gage, 94, American politician, member of the Montana Senate (1982–1998).
- Sara J. Harper, 98, American lawyer.
- Alan G. Hassenfeld, 76, American toy industry executive, CEO and chairman of Hasbro (1989–2008).
- Bertil Holmlund, 78, Swedish economist.
- Fanny Howe, 84, American poet.
- Roy William Ide III, 85, American lawyer, president of the ABA (1994–1995).
- Paulette Jiles, 82, American author (News of the World).
- Sándor M. Kiss, 82, Hungarian historian.
- Yuri Lishaev, 70, Ukrainian mountaineer.
- Viggo Madsen, 82, Danish poet and writer.
- Karel Malík, 64, Czech musician, composer, and poet.
- Philippe Mellier, 69, French businessman, CEO of De Beers (2011–2016).
- Laura Micheli, 94, Italian Olympic gymnast (1948).
- Dan Peterson, 84, Canadian politician, British Columbia MLA (1986–1991).
- Jürgen Schornagel, 85, German actor (Brother of Sleep, Comedian Harmonists).
- Bismillah Jan Shinwari, 41, Afghan cricket umpire, complications from surgery.

=== 9 ===
- Osvaldo Aquino, 73, Paraguayan footballer (Olimpia, national team), complications from Alzheimer's disease.
- Ian Blair, Baron Blair of Boughton, 72, British police officer and life peer, Commissioner of Police of the Metropolis (2005–2008), member of the House of Lords (since 2010).
- Ioana Bulcă, 89, Romanian actress (The Mill of Good Luck, A Woman for a Season, Then I Sentenced Them All to Death).
- Rüçhan Çamay, 94, Turkish singer.
- Joseph A. Capineri, 96, American politician, member of the Rhode Island House of Representatives (1957–1980).
- Maurice Choriol, 65, French-born German Roman Catholic Benedictine monk, abbot of Tholey Abbey (since 2008), heart attack.
- Joe Coleman, 78, American baseball player (Washington Senators, Detroit Tigers, Oakland Athletics).
- Brian Dixon, 89, Australian footballer (Melbourne) and politician, MP (1964–1982).
- Britt Edwall, 90, Swedish radio presenter (Sveriges Radio).
- Lee Elia, 87, American baseball player (Chicago White Sox) and manager (Philadelphia Phillies, Chicago Cubs).
- Tomás Flores, 60, Chilean economist, cancer.
- José Galli Neto, 75, Brazilian football player and manager (Botafogo-SP, Corinthians, Portuguesa).
- Kathleen Galvin-Halcro, 75, American politician, member of the Montana House of Representatives (1998–2006).
- Masako Izumi, 77, Japanese actress (Bad Girl, Tattooed Life, The Wild Sea), singer, and adventurer, cancer.
- Frank Layden, 93, American basketball coach (Niagara, Utah Jazz, Utah Starzz) and executive.
- Gérard Lécuyer, 88, Canadian politician, Manitoba MLA (1981–1988).
- Rabi' al-Madkhali, 92, Saudi Islamic scholar.
- Glen Michael, 99, British children's television presenter and entertainer (Francie and Josie).
- Heather Ross Miller, 85, American writer.
- Zubeida Mustafa, 84, Pakistani journalist (Dawn).
- C. M. Naim, 89, Indian-born American literary scholar.
- Masatoshi Naitō, 87, Japanese photographer.
- Abeyratne Pilapitiya, 99–100, Sri Lankan politician, chief minister of Sabaragamuwa province (1989–1993) and governor of Uva province (1993–1994). (death announced on this date)
- Ihor Poklad, 83, Ukrainian composer.
- Brunhilda de Portilla, 96, Costa Rican villancico composer and educator.
- Jeremy Railton, 80, Zimbabwean-born American art director and production designer, Emmy winner (1985, 2002).
- Ryan Reid, 38, American basketball player (Florida State Seminoles, Tulsa 66ers, Oklahoma City Thunder).
- William E. Roberts, 99, American politician, member of the New Hampshire House of Representatives (1998–2002).
- Steven Rose, 87, English neuroscientist (Not in Our Genes).
- Anthony Russell, 82, English Anglican clergyman, bishop of Ely (2000–2010).
- Alexander F. Schilt, 84, American academic, president of the University of Houston–Downtown (1980–1987).
- Martha K. Schwebach, 86, American nurse practitioner.
- Isaac Shapiro, 94, American lawyer.
- Yang Shaohua, 94, Chinese xiangsheng comedian and actor.

=== 10 ===
- Francesco Bellini, 77, Italian pharmaceutical industry and football executive, chairman of Ascoli (2014–2016), heart attack.
- Gérard Chasseguet, 95, French politician, deputy (1973–1993), mayor of Dissay-sous-Courcillon (1995–2001, 2008–2014).
- Arthur Coia, 82, American labor union leader, president of LIUNA (1993–1999).
- Radomir Damnjanović Damnjan, 89, Serbian-Italian painter.
- Chandra Shekhar Dubey, 87, Indian politician, MP (2004–2009), Bihar MLA (1985–2000), and twice Jharkhand MLA.
- Nicolas Dumont, 52, French road racing cyclist, traffic collision.
- David Gergen, 83, American political commentator and advisor, White House Communications Director (1976–1977, 1981–1984), complications from Lewy body dementia.
- Duff Hart-Davis, 89, British writer, naturalist and journalist.
- Claude Wendell Horton Jr., 83, American physicist.
- Maulana Khan Zeb, Pakistani religious scholar and politician, shot.
- Alan Lucas, 89, Australian yachtsman.
- Bun Hay Mean, 43, French comedian and actor (Asterix & Obelix: The Middle Kingdom), fall.
- Phil Mulloy, 76, British animator.
- Debbie Nightingale, 71, Canadian film and television producer, co-founder of the Hot Docs Canadian International Documentary Festival.
- Shwe Nya War Sayadaw, 60, Burmese Buddhist monk and political prisoner, liver disease.
- John Spilsbury, 91, English cricketer.
- Maung Thar Cho, 67, Burmese writer and columnist (7Day News), cancer.
- Michael Warren, 75, Irish sculptor.
- Andrew West, 65, English Sinologist, heart attack.
- Radhika Yadav, 25, Indian tennis player and coach, shot.
- Stepan Yurchyshyn, 67, Ukrainian football player (Karpaty Lviv, Podillya Khmelnytskyi, Soviet Union national team) and manager.

=== 11 ===
- Samuel Abt, 91, American journalist.
- Yiğit Bulut, 53, Turkish journalist (Radikal, Vatan, Referans) and political advisor, cancer.
- Toni Cruz, 78, Spanish singer and television producer.
- D. Cameron Findlay, 65, American attorney.
- Goffredo Fofi, 88, Italian essayist, journalist and film critic.
- Paulina Gamus, 88, Venezuelan politician, deputy (1993–1998).
- Raymond Guiot, 94, French flautist (Opéra de Paris), composer and academic teacher (Conservatoire de Paris).
- Khadidja Hamdi, Sahrawi politician and activist, first lady (1976–2016).
- Robert Hanhart, 100, Swiss Protestant theologian.
- Bob Joyce, 88, Australian Olympic hurdler (1956).
- David Kaff, 79, British musician (Rare Bird, Spinal Tap) and actor (This Is Spinal Tap).
- Jack Katz, 91, American audiologist.
- Rene Kirby, 70, American actor (Shallow Hal, Stuck on You).
- Jörgen Liik, 35, Estonian actor (November, Kättemaksukontor, Tuulepealne maa).
- Knuckles Madsen, 41, American professional wrestler (WWE), shot.
- Balaram Gharti Magar, 87, Nepali politician, MP (1994–1999).
- Eugenia Mandal, 68, Polish psychologist and academic.
- John Matthews, 95, British agricultural engineer.
- Glenn McCall, 71, American politician.
- Vadim Medvedev, 96, Russian economist.
- Jaroslav Polák, 87, Czech judoka.
- Donald Rose, 110, British supercentenarian and World War II veteran, oldest man in the United Kingdom (since 2024).
- William J. Rutter, 97, American biochemist.
- Gheorghe Șevcișin, 80, Moldovan conductor.
- Luis Sharpe, 65, Cuban football player (Arizona Cardinals), heart failure.
- Martin Cruz Smith, 82, American novelist (Gorky Park, Nightwing, Havana Bay).
- Jodie Steck, 73, American photojournalist, ovarian cancer.
- Sol Stern, 89, American journalist (City Journal) and author.
- Iris Williams, 79, Welsh singer.
- Billy Wilson, 88, Northern Irish footballer (Linfield).
- Moshe Zar, 88, Israeli religious Zionist and convicted terrorist.

=== 12 ===
- Abbas Anvari, 81, Iranian physicist.
- Ammar Bakdash, 70, Syrian politician and economist, heart attack.
- Rudolf van den Berg, 76, Dutch film director (Evenings, Tirza, A Real Vermeer) and screenwriter, cardiac arrest.
- Jean-Claude Bernardet, 88, Belgian-born Brazilian writer, actor, and screenwriter.
- Jim Clancy, 69, American baseball player (Toronto Blue Jays, Houston Astros, Atlanta Braves).
- Alan Collinge, 90, British air force officer and cricketer (Combined Services cricket team).
- Werner Daum, 81, German diplomat.
- Gunter Faure, 90-91, Estonian-born American geochemist.
- Hazel Fox, 96, British lawyer.
- John Freeman, 86, Australian politician.
- John G. Gary, 81, American politician, member of the Maryland House of Delegates (1983–1995).
- Sylvi Graham, 73, Norwegian politician, MP (2009–2017).
- A. Derek Guthrie, 89, Canadian lawyer and judge.
- Allan Ray Guy, 99, Canadian educator and politician, member of the Legislative Assembly of Saskatchewan (1960–1975).
- Gadul Singh Lama, 86, Indian writer.
- Mario Mactas, 80, Argentine journalist and writer, pneumonia.
- Marilynne Morgan, 79, British barrister.
- Harold Neufeld, 97, Canadian politician, Manitoba MLA (1988–1993).
- Bayan Nuwayhed, 88, Palestinian journalist and historian.
- Ramamurti Rajaraman, 86, Indian academic.
- Lucio Russo, 80, Italian physicist, mathematician and science historian.
- Celestino Sánchez Ramos, 74, Spanish activist (15-M) and politician, member of the Catalan parliament (1980–1984, 1988–1992).
- Milan Švihálek, 81, Czech playwright, screenwriter, and journalist.
- Errol Trzebinski, 89, British writer.
- Anne Walmsley, 93, British book editor, critic and author.
- Melissa F. Wells, 92, Estonian-born American diplomat, ambassador to Mozambique (1987–1990), DRC (1991–1992) and Estonia (1998–2001).

=== 13 ===
- Yunita Ababiel, 61, Indonesian dangdut singer.
- Sikiru Kayode Adetona, 91, Nigerian monarch, Awujale of the Ijẹbu Kingdom (since 1960).
- David Adickes, 98, American sculptor.
- Alberto Bottari de Castello, 83, Italian Roman Catholic prelate, apostolic nuncio to Gambia (1999–2005), Japan (2005–2011) and Hungary (2011–2017).
- Muhammadu Buhari, 82, Nigerian military officer and politician, military head of state (1983–1985), president (2015–2023), and governor of Borno State (1975–1976).
- José António Camacho, 79, Portuguese politician, member of the Constituent Assembly (1975–1976), MP (1976–1980).
- Jack Cera, 69, American politician, member of the Ohio House of Representatives (1983–1996, 2011–2020).
- Bill Chamberlain, 75, American basketball player (Memphis Tams, Kentucky Colonels, Phoenix Suns).
- Sir Anthony Cleaver, 87, British engineer and businessman.
- Saul Cordero, 84, Puerto Rican radio and television personality.
- Dave Cousins, 85, English musician (Strawbs) and songwriter ("Lay Down", "Shine on Silver Sun").
- Michael Diedrich, 70, American politician, member of the South Dakota Senate (1987–1991, 1993–1995) and House of Representatives (2017–2021).
- Tima Džebo, 61, Bosnian basketball player (ŽKK Željezničar Sarajevo, ŽKK Šibenik, Yugoslavia national team).
- Billy Eisenberg, 87, American bridge player.
- Richard H. Fallon Jr., 73, American legal scholar, cancer.
- Flávio, 54, Brazilian footballer (Athletico Paranaense, Paraná, CSA), prostate cancer.
- Yves Galland, 84, French businessman and politician, MEP (1979–1986, 1989–1995).
- K. B. Ganapathy, 85, Indian writer and editor (Star of Mysore, Mysooru Mithra).
- Viktor Gostishchev, 87, Russian scientist.
- Donald Kerr, 86, American scientist and politician, director of the National Reconnaissance Office (2005–2007).
- Jacky Le Menn, 84, French politician, senator (2008–2014).
- Mark Schreiber, Baron Marlesford, 93, British politician, member of the House of Lords (since 1991).
- Ilkka Mesikämmen, 82, Finnish Olympic ice hockey player (1964).
- Enrique Nicanor, 80, Spanish television producer and director (La 2), and media designer.
- Rostislav Prokop, 58, Slovak footballer (DAC 1904 Dunajská Streda, 1. FK Drnovice). (death announced on this date)
- Edmund Przegaliński, 87, Polish neuropsychopharmacologist.
- Kota Srinivasa Rao, 83, Indian actor (Krishnam Vande Jagadgurum, Attarintiki Daredi, Little Soldiers) and politician, Andhra Pradesh MLA (1999–2004).
- Constance Simelane, 82, Eswatini politician.
- Francesco Tagliarini, 89, Italian politician, deputy (1968–1972).
- Christel Truglia, 89, German-American politician, member of the Connecticut House of Representatives (1988–2008).
- George T. Warren II, 88, American politician, member of the Georgia State Senate (1973–1976).

=== 14 ===
- Thierry Ardisson, 76, French television producer and host, liver cancer.
- Jean-Pierre Azéma, 87, French historian.
- Roseann Bentley, 89, American politician, member of the Missouri Senate (1995–2003).
- Chang Jung-lin, 40, Taiwanese professional pool player.
- B. Saroja Devi, 87, Indian actress (Mallammana Pavada, Panduranga Mahatyam, Nadodi Mannan).
- Hermann W. Dommel, 91, German inventor.
- Zvika Dror, 98, Israeli historian of Holocaust survivors testimonies, the kibbutz and the IDF.
- Saul Elkin, 93, American actor and director, founder of Shakespeare in Delaware Park.
- Eileen Fulton, 91, American actress (As the World Turns, Nero Wolfe, Our Private World).
- Andrea Gibson, 49, American poet, ovarian cancer.
- Lamont Green, 49, American football player (Atlanta Falcons, Carolina Panthers).
- Bobby L. Harnage, 85, American labor leader, AFGE president (1997–2003).
- Bob Hiensch, 77, Dutch diplomat.
- George Kanyeihamba, 85, Ugandan politician and jurist, justice of the Supreme Court (1997–2009).
- John MacArthur, 86, American pastor (Grace Community Church) and evangelist, pneumonia.
- Avril MacRory, 69, Irish television executive.
- Victor McElheny, 89, American science writer and journalist.
- Ron McQueeney, 80, American sports photographer, complications from a stroke.
- Charlie Miller, 80, Scottish celebrity hairdresser, complications from Alzheimer's disease.
- Alexander Mitta, 92, Russian film director (Shine, Shine, My Star, How Czar Peter the Great Married Off His Moor, Air Crew), screenwriter and actor, complications from a stroke.
- Yuri Moroz, 68, Russian film director (The Witches Cave, Black Square), actor (Visit to Minotaur) and producer.
- Bill Neukom, 83, American baseball executive, owner of San Francisco Giants (2008–2011), and lawyer, president of the ABA (2007–2008).
- Jean-Pierre Putters, 79, French journalist and film critic, founder of Mad Movies.
- Gami Astoingué Richard, 34, Chadian film director.
- Tadeusz Rolke, 96, Polish photographer.
- Andor Schmuck, 54, Hungarian politician.
- Mary Shields, 80, American musher (Iditarod).
- Fauja Singh, Indian-British marathon runner and longevity claimant, traffic collision.
- Andrey Sokolov, 51, Russian animator, screenwriter and production designer.
- William Henry Stafford Jr., 94, American jurist, judge (since 1975) and chief judge (1981–1993) of the U.S. District Court of Northern Florida.
- Matiullah Turab, 54, Afghan poet, heart attack.
- Lars Vatten, 73, Norwegian epidemiologist.
- Mike Woodger, 102, British computer scientist.

=== 15 ===
- Haroutune Armenian, 83, Lebanese-born Armenian-American physician and academic administrator, president of the American University of Armenia (1997–2009).
- Beverly Armstrong, 90, American baseball player (Rockford Peaches).
- Wagner Basílio, 65, Brazilian footballer (Corinthians, São Paulo, Bahia).
- Frank E. Baxter, 88, American diplomat, ambassador to Uruguay (2006–2009).
- Jean Frantz Blackall, 97, American literary scholar.
- Ronald T. Borchardt, 81, American pharmaceutical chemist.
- Giuseppe Caminiti, 90, Italian politician, deputy (2001–2006).
- Héctor Dante Cincotta, 82, Argentine writer.
- Ingrid Figur, 88, German soprano.
- Robert W. Fuller, 88, American physicist, co-founder of The Hunger Project.
- Robert A. Funk, 85, American banker, chairman of the Federal Reserve Bank of Kansas City (2005–2007).
- Gholamhossein Gheybparvar, 63, Iranian military officer, head of Basij (2016–2019).
- Jeanette Grasselli Brown, 96, American analytical chemist.
- Jeff Greer, 61, American politician, member of the Kentucky House of Representatives (2007–2019).
- Audun Grønvold, 49, Norwegian alpine and freestyle skier, Olympic bronze medalist (2010), lightning strike.
- Dale R. Herspring, 84, American political scientist.
- Klaus-Jürgen Holzapfel, 95, German publisher.
- Bob Hutchison, 94, Canadian Olympic sprinter.
- Paul Janensch, 86, American executive editor.
- Dheeraj Kumar, 80, Indian actor (Sargam, Roti Kapada Aur Makaan, Beharoopia), television producer and director, pneumonia.
- Pınar Kür, 82, Turkish novelist, academician, and translator.
- Loïk Le Floch-Prigent, 81, French oil industry and railway executive, and convicted embezzler, CEO of Elf Aquitaine (1989–1993) and president of SNCF (1995–1996).
- Judy Loe, 78, English actress (Singles, Space Island One, Casualty), cancer.
- Hani Mahmassani, 69, Lebanese-American engineer.
- Jack McAuliffe, 80, American brewer.
- Gerasimos Michelis, 59, Greek actor (Sto Para Pente).
- Bradley John Murdoch, 67, Australian convicted murderer (Peter Falconio), throat cancer.
- Madani Naamoun, 81, Algerian actor.
- Kelvin Ogilvie, 82, Canadian academic and politician, senator (2009–2017).
- Michael Patella, 70, American theologian.
- Karen Ritscher, 73, American violinist.
- Claude Roire, 86, French journalist (Le Canard enchaîné).
- Anne Šaraškin, 87, Estonian figure skater and referee.
- Raymond Stieber, 89, French footballer (RC Strasbourg).
- Wilfried Stroh, 85, German classical philologist.
- Fello Suberví, 83, Dominican politician, twice mayor of Santo Domingo, deputy (1990–1994, 1998–2000).
- Emre Törün, 53, Turkish actor and voice artist, pancreatic cancer.
- Lluis Viu, 82, Andorran-Spanish Olympic skier (1964) and politician, mayor of Andorra la Vella (1992–1997).

=== 16 ===
- Phoebe Asiyo, 92, Kenyan politician and women's rights activist, MP (1980–1983, 1992–1997).
- Bryan Braman, 38, American football player (Houston Texans, Philadelphia Eagles), cancer.
- José Cestero, 88, Dominican painter.
- Bill Clay, 94, American politician, member of the U.S. House of Representatives (1969–2001).
- James Doty, 69, American physician.
- Patrick Experton, 83, French test pilot.
- Ahmed Faras, 78, Moroccan footballer (Chabab Mohammédia, national team).
- Gerhard Fels, 86, German economist.
- Connie Francis, 87, American pop singer ("Everybody's Somebody's Fool", "Pretty Little Baby", "My Heart Has a Mind of Its Own"), pneumonia.
- Dionisio García Carnero, 70, Spanish politician, senator (1993–1999, 2004–2019).
- Hatsuko Hirose, 88, Japanese Olympic diver (1956, 1964), liver cancer.
- Asbjørn Jordahl, 92, Norwegian politician, MP (1977–1981), minister of transport and communications (1978–1979).
- Yuri Kara, 70, Russian film director (Tomorrow Was the War, Barons of Crime, Hamlet. XXI Century), screenwriter and producer, heart attack.
- Gary Karr, 83, American double bassist, founder of the ISB.
- Livingstone Luboobi, 80, Ugandan mathematician and academic administrator, vice-chancellor of Makerere University (2004–2009), lymphoma.
- Nono Maldonado, 79, Puerto Rican fashion designer and entrepreneur.
- Vojtěch Mareš, 88, Czech handball player and coach, world champion (1967).
- Bruce McTavish, 84, New Zealand boxing referee.
- Asdrúbal Meléndez, 89, Venezuelan actor, visual artist and writer.
- Javier Moscoso, 90, Spanish jurist and politician, attorney general (1986–1990) and minister of the presidency (1982–1986).
- Volodymyr Mykyta, 94, Ukrainian painter.
- Safarali Nadzhmiddinov, 73, Tajik politician, minister of finance (2000–2013).
- José María Obaldía, 99, Uruguayan writer and lexicographer, president of the Academia Nacional de Letras (1999–2003).
- C. V. Padmarajan, 93, Indian politician, Kerala MLA (1982–1987, 1991–1996).
- Claus Peymann, 88, German theatre director and intendant (Burgtheater, Berliner Ensemble).
- Samuele Privitera, 19, Italian road racing cyclist, fall.
- Eero Raittinen, 80, Finnish singer (The Boys).
- Barrie Robran, 77, Australian footballer (North Adelaide).
- Andrew Saint, 78, English architectural historian.
- H. Andrew Schwartz, 56, American journalist and policy analyst, chief communications officer of the Center for Strategic and International Studies.
- Wilbert Scott, 86, American football player (Pittsburgh Steelers, Montreal Alouettes, Hamilton Tiger-Cats)
- Gilberto Severini, 84, Italian novelist.
- Martial Sinda, 89–90, Congolese poet and politician, senator (1992–1993).
- Alexander Tantlevsky, 95, Russian art historian.
- Claude Teisseire, 94, French rugby league player (AS Carcassonne, Lézignan, national team).
- Wayne Thomas, 77, Canadian ice hockey player (Montreal Canadiens, Toronto Maple Leafs, New York Rangers), cancer.
- Taylor Wong, 75, Hong Kong film director (Behind the Yellow Line, The Truth, The Three Swordsmen), throat cancer.
- Xu Jingye, 73, Chinese politician, heart failure.

=== 17 ===
- Felix Baumgartner, 56, Austrian skydiver and extreme sportsman (Red Bull Stratos), paragliding crash.
- Jac Bekker, 82, South African politician, permanent delegate to the National Council of Provinces (2009–2014).
- Alan Bergman, 99, American songwriter ("The Way We Were", "You Don't Bring Me Flowers"), Oscar winner (1968, 1974, 1984).
- Mark Bonokoski, 78, Canadian newspaper columnist, lung cancer.
- Skip Brittenham, 83, American attorney.
- Gary Chown, 73, Canadian football player (Montreal Alouettes).
- Wyn Davies, 83, Welsh footballer (Newcastle United, Bolton Wanderers, national team).
- Thomas Sayers Ellis, 61, American poet, photographer and musician.
- Berit Frodi, 99, Swedish actress (The Koster Waltz).
- Tommy Gallagher, 82, Northern Irish politician, MLA (1998–2011).
- Francesco Gnerre, 81, Italian essayist, literary critic, and sociologist.
- Russ Jackman, 95, Canadian curler.
- Joanna Kołaczkowska, 59, Polish actress, brain tumor.
- Evgeny Krasavin, 83, Russian scientist.
- Jake Larson, 102, American WWII veteran and TikToker.
- David Mazzarella, 87, American journalist and newspaper editor (USA Today), complications from a fall.
- Don McIntosh, 94, New Zealand rugby union player (Wellington, national team).
- Ramiro, 92, Brazilian footballer (Santos, Atlético Madrid, national team).
- William I. Rose, 80–81, American geologist.
- Giuseppe Spalazzi, 82, Italian footballer (Bologna, Palermo).
- William Spelman, 68, American criminologist and politician.
- John Stone, 96, Australian politician, senator (1987–1990).
- István Szabó, 80, Hungarian Olympic handball player (1972).
- Jean Tartier, 83, French Protestant pastor, president of the Protestant Federation of France (1997–1999).
- Greer Twiss, 88, New Zealand sculptor (Karangahape Rocks), AFNZ Icon (since 2011).
- Laura Vinson, 78, Canadian singer-songwriter.
- Udo Voigt, 73, German politician, MEP (2014–2019).
- Daphne Walker, 94, New Zealand singer.

=== 18 ===
- José Acosta Cubero, 78, Spanish politician, deputy (1979–2008).
- David Alliance, Baron Alliance, 93, Iranian-born British retailer, member of the House of Lords (2004–2025).
- Michał Bałasz, 102, Polish architect.
- Clark Perry Baldwin, 63, American serial killer.
- Percy Barnevik, 84, Swedish business executive, chairman of ABB (1999–2002), complications from a stroke.
- Margaret Boden, 88, British cognitive scientist.
- Andrea Bonomi, 84–85, Italian philosopher.
- Joseph Casello, 73, American politician, member of the Florida House of Representatives (since 2018), heart attack.
- Choi Jongcheon, 71, South Korean poet, cerebral infarction.
- Helen Cornelius, 83, American country singer-songwriter.
- Roberto Duailibi, 89, Brazilian advertising executive.
- Aganetha Dyck, 87, Canadian sculptor.
- Edwin Feulner, 83, American political scientist, founder of The Heritage Foundation.
- Florência, 86, Portuguese singer.
- René Fortunato, 67, Dominican filmmaker, cancer.
- Hal Galper, 87, American jazz pianist, composer, and bandleader.
- José María Guelbenzu, 81, Spanish writer.
- Pasty Harris, 81, English cricketer (Middlesex, Nottinghamshire, Wellington).
- Homayun, 88, Iranian actor (Topoli, Soltane Ghalbha).
- Jimmy Hunt, 85, American actor (Invaders from Mars, Cheaper by the Dozen, Sorry, Wrong Number), complications from a heart attack.
- Christian Joerges, 81, German legal scholar.
- Elizabeth Topham Kennan, 87, American academic administrator, president of Mount Holyoke College (1978–1995).
- Edward Kupczyński, 96, Polish speedway rider.
- Svatopluk Kvaizar, 77, Czech racing driver.
- Michael Melski, 56, Canadian filmmaker (Mile Zero, Touch & Go, Charlie Zone) and playwright.
- Sir Roger Norrington, 91, British conductor (London Classical Players, Camerata Salzburg, Stuttgart Radio Symphony Orchestra).
- Hitomi Obara, 44, Japanese wrestler, Olympic champion (2012).
- Josip Pejaković, 78, Bosnian actor (Silent Gunpowder) and writer (Novi Plamen).
- Velu Prabhakaran, 68, Indian film director (Adhisaya Manithan, Rajali, Puratchikkaaran).
- Peter Ryan, 64, Australian journalist.
- Patrick Sawyerr, 77, French ice hockey player and coach (OHS Paris-Viry, ASG Tours, Nantes HC).
- Olga Sirotinina, 102, Russian linguist.
- Harry Standjofski, 66, Canadian actor (Assassin's Creed, Barney's Version, Young Robin Hood).
- Robert M. Stein, 75, American political scientist, cancer.
- Abdul Mannan Talukder, 89, Bangladeshi politician, MP (1991–2006).
- Shunsaku Tamiya, 90, Japanese business executive (Tamiya Corporation).
- Michel Van Roye, 73, Belgian politician, member of the Parliament of the Brussels-Capital Region (2001–2004).
- María Gracia Varas, 23, Chilean athlete, infectious mononucleosis.
- Fish Venkat, 53, Indian actor (Kushi, Aadi, Samanyudu), complications from kidney and liver failure.
- Mary Vingoe, 70, Canadian playwright, actress, and theatre company founder (Nightwood Theatre, Ship's Company Theatre, Eastern Front Theatre), multiple myeloma.
- André Vingt-Trois, 82, French Roman Catholic cardinal, archbishop of Paris (2005–2017).
- Graylin Warner, 62, American basketball player (Louisiana Ragin' Cajuns), prostate cancer.
- Kenneth Washington, 89, American actor (Hogan's Heroes, Adam-12, Westworld).
- Rex White, 94, American Hall of Fame racing driver, NASCAR Cup Series champion (1960).
- Jim Youngsman, 87, American politician, member of the Washington House of Representatives (1989–1991).
- Roberto Zywica, 78, Argentine football player (Gimnasia de La Plata, Stade de Reims, national team) and manager.

=== 19 ===
- Soltan Abbas, 92, Azerbaijani poet.
- Dmitri Alekseyev, 52, Russian footballer (Dynamo Saint Petersburg, Rubin Kazan, Dynamo Bryansk).
- Ingvar Ambjørnsen, 69, Norwegian writer.
- Alain Anziani, 74, French politician, senator (2008–2017).
- Charles Augins, 81, American actor, choreographer (Red Dwarf, Labyrinth, Five Guys Named Moe) and dancer.
- David Benaron, 66, American digital health businessman, physician and academic (Stanford University).
- Jeff Bittiger, 63, American baseball player (Chicago White Sox, Philadelphia Phillies, Minnesota Twins), cancer.
- Bobby Bright, 80, English-born Australian singer (Bobby & Laurie) and television host (Dig We Must).
- Sergio Campana, 90, Italian footballer (LR Vicenza, Bologna) and lawyer.
- John P. Campbell, 87, American psychologist.
- Luigi Antonio Cantafora, 82, Italian Roman Catholic prelate, bishop of Lamezia Terme (2004–2019).
- Raymond Damblant, 94, French-born Canadian judoka.
- Giora Epstein, 87, Israeli Air Force officer and fighter ace.
- Karl G. Johnson, 52, American neuroscientist.
- Jeremy Kinross, 65, Australian politician, New South Wales MP (1992–1999), choked.
- Zofia Kowalczyk, 96, Polish Olympic gymnast (1952).
- Uvalde Lindsey, 85, American politician, member of the Arkansas House of Representatives (2009–2013) and Senate (2013–2019).
- Joanna Macy, 96, American environmentalist.
- Anton Marik, 84–85, Austrian conductor.
- Ray Millington, 93, Australian footballer (Fitzroy).
- Aldo Monges, 83, Argentine singer.
- Kenichi Morita, 76, Japanese computer scientist.
- Lee Mummery, 89, New Zealand cricketer (Central Districts) and table tennis player.
- M. K. Muthu, 77, Indian actor (Pillaiyo Pillai, Pookkari, Anaiya Vilakku), playback singer and politician.
- Zed Ndamane, 61, South African cricketer umpire.
- Altan Öymen, 93, Turkish journalist and politician, minister of tourism (1977), multiple organ failure.
- Lena Pappa, 93, Greek poet.
- Matthew Patrick, 73, American politician, member of the Massachusetts House of Representatives (2001–2011), cancer.
- Jérôme Peignot, 99, French novelist and poet.
- Michael Ranville, 81, American political consultant and author.
- Ross Rowland, 85, American railroad preservationist, cancer.
- Michael Rowlands, 80-81, British academic and anthropologist.
- Al-Waleed bin Khalid Al-Saud, 36, Saudi prince, complications from a cerebral hemorrhage.
- Raymond Saunders, 90, American visual artist.
- Rezeda Sharafieva, 59, Russian singer, cancer.
- Gary Smith, 90, American television producer.
- Rustem Suleymanov, 47, Russian violinist and conductor.
- Yasmeen Tahir, 88, Pakistani broadcaster (Radio Pakistan).
- Béatrice Uria-Monzon, 61, French mezzo-soprano.
- Joe Vigil, 95, American track and field coach (Adams State Grizzlies).
- Elena Zhambalova, 38, Russian poet, cardiac arrest.

=== 20 ===
- Chandra Barot, 86, Indian film director (Don), pulmonary fibrosis.
- Rodney Baxter, 85, British-born Australian physicist.
- Edoardo Boncinelli, 84, Italian geneticist.
- Joan Callau i Bartolí, 65, Spanish teacher and politician, mayor of Sant Adrià de Besòs (2013–2021).
- Preta Gil, 50, Brazilian singer-songwriter, actress (Agora É que São Elas, Caminhos do Coração), and businesswoman, complications from colorectal cancer.
- Shmuel Goren, 97, Israeli military officer, commander of Unit 504 (1962–1968).
- Owen Gray, 86, Jamaican reggae musician.
- Abu Hena, 75, Indian politician, West Bengal MLA (1991–2021).
- Kenneth Hermele, 76, Swedish economist.
- Hal Hopson, 92, American composer.
- Razia Jan, 81, Afghan humanitarian.
- Lale Karabıyık, 59, Turkish politician and academic, MP (2015–2023), soft-tissue sarcoma.
- Otto H. Kegel, 91, German mathematician.
- Hamiduzzaman Khan, 79, Bangladeshi sculptor, complications from dengue fever and pneumonia.
- Bob Kosid, 83, Canadian football player (Saskatchewan Roughriders).
- Urszula Kozioł, 94, Polish poet and writer, Nike Award laureate (2024).
- José Maria Marin, 93, Brazilian politician, football administrator, and convicted racketeer, São Paulo MLA (1971–1979), governor of São Paulo (1982–1983), and president of the CBF (2012–2015).
- Sir Jamie McGrigor, 6th Baronet, 75, Scottish politician, MSP (1999–2016), emphysema.
- Sasho Pargov, 79, Bulgarian footballer (Marek Dupnitsa).
- Bianca Maria Piccinino, 101, Italian journalist and television presenter.
- Mario Pirata, 67, Brazilian writer.
- Samuel L. Reed, 90, American judge and politician, member of the Indiana House of Representatives (1972–1976).
- Lloyd Stephen Riford Jr., 101, American politician, member of the New York State Assembly (1971–1983) and Senate (1983–1986).
- Viktor Safronov, 93, Russian painter.
- Peter Seidel, 98, American architect and writer.
- Donald Soffer, 92, American businessman and real estate developer.
- Andrew Soward, 81, British fluid dynamicist.
- Tom Troupe, 97, American actor (Kelly's Heroes, My Own Private Idaho, The Devil's Brigade).
- Malcolm-Jamal Warner, 54, American actor (The Cosby Show, Malcolm & Eddie, The Resident) and musician, Grammy winner (2015), drowned.
- Robin Whitfield, 81, English rugby league referee, complications from Alzheimer's disease.
- Henning Wind, 88, Danish sailor, Olympic bronze medalist (1964).
- Wayne W. Wood, 95, American politician, member of the Wisconsin State Assembly (1976–2005).

=== 21 ===
- V. S. Achuthanandan, 101, Indian politician, chief minister of Kerala (2006–2011) and seven-time Kerala MLA, complications from cardiac arrest.
- Pau Alsina, 17, Spanish motorcycle racer, training crash.
- Bruce Anderson, 75, American politician, member of the Minnesota House of Representatives (1995–2013) and Senate (since 2013).
- Jorge Aulicino, 75, Argentine journalist.
- Cedric Badjeck, 30, Cameroonian-Dutch footballer (FC Utrecht, Excelsior).
- Roy Black, 80, American defense attorney.
- Jean Boyer, 88, French politician, senator (2001–2014).
- Sir Kenneth Calman, 83, Scottish oncologist and academic administrator, CMO for England (1991–1997), chancellor of the University of Glasgow (2006–2020) and vice-chancellor of Durham University (1998–2006).
- Maherin Chowdhury, 46–47, Bangladeshi teacher, burns.
- Kirk Corbin, 70, Barbadian footballer (Wycombe Wanderers, Cambridge United).
- Gilles Dowek, 58, French computer scientist, cancer.
- Thomas Anthony Durkin, 78, American defense attorney, lung cancer.
- James E. Ferguson II, 82, American lawyer (Wilmington Ten).
- Rose Leiman Goldemberg, 97, American playwright and screenwriter (The Burning Bed, Stone Pillow).
- José Luis González, 37, Spanish triathlete, traffic collision.
- Crescencio Gutiérrez, 91, Mexican footballer (Chivas, Atlas, national team).
- Jane Kessler, 104, American psychologist.
- Ivan Laluha, 92, Slovak historian, academic and politician, MP (1992–1994).
- Peter Lockemann, 89, German computer science academic.
- Bohdan Melnychuk, 88, Ukrainian writer, journalist and translator.
- Cahit Ölmez, 62, Dutch actor (Flikken, Kauwboy, Baantjer), cancer.
- John Palmer, 82, English musician (Family, Blossom Toes, Bakerloo).
- David Rendall, 76, English operatic tenor.
- Robert Resnik, 72, American radio host.
- Lalrintluanga Sailo, 65, Indian politician, Mizoram MLA (since 2018).
- Ronald G. Sheppard, 85, American politician, member of the Oklahoma House of Representatives (1979–1980).
- B. R. Skelton, 92, American politician, member of the South Carolina House of Representatives (2002–2014).
- Waldemar Skrzypczak, 69, Polish general.
- Todor Slavkov, 54, Bulgarian businessman and television personality, suicide by gunshot.
- John Stevens, 77, American Buddhist priest and religious scholar.
- Ivan Ulanov, 92, Russian actor.
- Paul Ulenbelt, 73, Dutch politician, trade unionist and academic, member of the House of Representatives (2006–2017).
- Des van Jaarsveldt, 96, Southern Rhodesian-born South African rugby union player (national team, Rhodesia national team).
- June Wilkinson, 85, English actress (The Private Lives of Adam and Eve, The Bellboy and the Playgirls) and model (Playboy Magazine).
- Tatyana Yegorova, 81, Russian actress (Office Romance, Time of Desires, Armavir), writer and journalist.
- Fritz Ynfante, 84, Filipino television director (Bida si Mister, Bida si Misis) and actor.
- Dan Ziskie, 80, American actor (Concussion, Thirteen Days, Adventures in Babysitting) and photographer, arteriosclerotic cardiovascular disease.

=== 22 ===
- Lars Akerhaug, 43, Norwegian journalist (Minerva, Verdens Gang, Aftenposten) and writer.
- Mian Muhammad Azhar, 80, Pakistani politician, governor of Punjab (1990–1993), mayor of Lahore (1987–1990), and three-time MNA.
- Lawrence Bossidy, 90, American conglomerate industry executive, CEO of AlliedSignal (1991–1999).
- Michael Bury, 79, British sociologist.
- Brian Charrington, 68, English drug trafficker.
- Paul Chiu, 83, Taiwanese politician, vice premier (2008–2009) and minister of finance (1996–2000).
- Emily Cranz, 82, American-born Mexican actress (La cigüeña distraída, Canta mi corazón, Farewell to Marriage) and singer.
- Chris Doyle, 66, American multi-media artist.
- Charles C. Droz, 101, American politician, member (1957–1969) and speaker (1965–1966) of the South Dakota House of Representatives.
- John Fallon, 84, Scottish footballer (Celtic).
- Muhamed Glavović, 81, Bosnian footballer (Velež Mostar, Sloboda Užice, Radnički Niš).
- Sir Guy Green, 87, Australian judge, governor of Tasmania (1995–2003), and acting governor-general of Australia (2003).
- Jane Greer, 72, American poet.
- Iie Sumirat, 74, Indonesian badminton player.
- Joey Jones, 70, Welsh footballer (Wrexham, Liverpool, national team).
- Tsunehiko Kamijō, 85, Japanese actor (Princess Mononoke, Spirited Away, Death of a Tea Master).
- George Kooymans, 77, Dutch musician (Golden Earring) and songwriter ("Twilight Zone", "Radar Love"), complications from amyotrophic lateral sclerosis.
- Julian LeFay, 59, Danish video game designer (The Elder Scrolls, Dragon's Lair, The Terminator 2029), cancer.
- Volodymyr Lukan, 64, Ukrainian artist.
- Chuck Mangione, 84, American flugelhornist, composer ("Feels So Good") and actor (King of the Hill), Grammy winner (1977, 1979).
- David Fairley McInnis, 90, American politician, member of the South Carolina House of Representatives (1975–1982).
- Ozzy Osbourne, 76, English Hall of Fame musician (Black Sabbath), songwriter ("Paranoid"), and television personality (The Osbournes), heart attack.
- Celeste Pin, 64, Italian footballer (Perugia, Verona, Fiorentina).
- Irina Podnosova, 71, Russian jurist, chief justice (since 2024), cancer.
- Julio Sacristán, 71, Spanish politician.
- Berle M. Schiller, 81, American jurist, judge of the Superior Court of Pennsylvania (1996–2000) and the U.S. District Court for the Eastern District of Pennsylvania (since 2000).
- Mikhail Tarasenko, 77, Russian politician, MP (since 2007).
- Rumena Trifonova, 81, Bulgarian actress (Porcupines Are Born Without Bristles, Warming Up Yesterday's Lunch, The Grey Zone).
- Alfie Wise, 82, American actor (Smokey and the Bandit, The Cannonball Run, Stroker Ace).
- Edvard Zaikouski, 72, Belarusian archaeologist.
- Shelly Zegart, 84, American artist.

=== 23 ===
- Carl Auteried Jr., 81, Austrian Olympic sailor (1976).
- Jacques Borker, 102, French artist.
- Abdallah Bou Habib, 83, Lebanese diplomat, minister of foreign affairs and emigrants (2021–2025) and ambassador to the United States (1983–1990), heart attack.
- Michael A. Cardozo, 84, American lawyer.
- Michelle Duff, 85, Canadian motorcycle racer.
- Alexandru Gheorghiaș, Romanian sports commentator.
- Mir Belayet Hossain, 70, Bangladeshi cricketer (Abahani Krira Chakra, national team).
- Ahmed Jan, 73, Pakistani football referee.
- Laurence Kelly, 92, English biographer.
- Jean Kerléo, 93, French perfumer.
- Maeve Kyle, 96, Irish Olympic track athlete (1956, 1960, 1964) and hockey player.
- Jean Lacombe, 82, French politician, deputy (1981–1993).
- Caius Lungu, 36, Romanian footballer (Fortuna Covaci, Voința Sibiu, Ripensia Timișoara), heart attack.
- Michael Ochs, 82, American photographic archivist.
- Oscar, 18, Jersey bionic cat. (death announced on this date)
- Brian Owen, 80, English footballer (Watford, Colchester United, Wolverhampton Wanderers).
- Arnold Palacios, 69, Northern Marianan politician, governor (since 2023), lieutenant governor (2019–2023) and president of the Senate (2017–2019).
- Tony Peers, 78, British actor (Emmerdale, Coronation Street, L.A. Without a Map).
- Ajit Rai, 57, Indian film and theatre critic and cultural journalist.
- Warren Ralph, 66, Australian footballer (Carlton).
- Jeffery Rowthorn, 91, Welsh Anglican bishop and hymnographer.
- Violeta Sekuj, 94, Albanian actress.
- Annette Shelby, 86, American academic.
- Ron Silverman, 92, American film producer (Brubaker, Krull, Shoot to Kill).
- Mikhail Smolin, 54, Russian historian.
- Henri Szeps, 81, Swiss-born Australian actor (Mother and Son, Palace of Dreams, Run, Rebecca, Run), complications from Alzheimer's disease.
- Ants Tael, 89, Estonian dancer and dance pedagogue.
- Ahmad Tavakkoli, 74, Iranian politician, minister of labour (1981–1983), member of the Expediency Discernment Council (since 2017) and twice MP, heart attack.
- Ratan Thiyam, 77, Indian playwright (Lairembigee Eshei).
- Antonio Trevín, 69, Spanish teacher and politician, president of Asturias (1993–1995) and deputy (2011–2017), pancreatic cancer.
- George Veikoso, 55, Fijian musician.
- Andreas Zafiropoulos, 91, Greek football executive, president of AEK Athens (1981–1982, 1984–1988).

=== 24 ===
- Octavio Alberola, 97, Spanish physicist and anti-Francoist activist.
- Peter Betthausen, 84, German art historian.
- G. Holmes Braddock, 100, American politician, member of the Miami-Dade County Public School Board (1962–2000).
- Viktor Burakov, 70, Ukrainian Olympic sprinter (1980).
- Hendrika B. Cantwell, 100, German-born American physician and educator.
- Josef Černý, 85, Czech ice hockey player (Spartak Plzeň, ZKL Brno, ATSE Graz) and coach.
- Julio César Cortés, 84, Uruguayan football player (Rosario Central, Guanacasteca, national team) and coach.
- Jean-Pol Dubois, 74, French actor (A Captain's Honor, Vidocq, Fanfan la Tulipe).
- Sulochana Gadgil, 81, Indian meteorologist.
- Hulk Hogan, 71, American Hall of Fame professional wrestler (WWF, WCW) and actor (Suburban Commando), heart attack.
- Khanhuseyn Kazimli, 82, Azerbaijani politician, MP (1995–2020), complications from Parkinson's disease.
- Richard Kennedy, 92, American children's book writer (Amy's Eyes).
- Dame Cleo Laine, 97, English jazz singer (On the Town), Grammy winner (1986).
- Sir Mark Lennox-Boyd, 82, British politician, MP (1978–1996) and under-secretary of state for foreign affairs (1990–1994), brain cancer.
- Amalia Macías, 91, Mexican singer and actress.
- Tommy McLain, 85, American swamp pop musician ("Sweet Dreams").
- Chiel Montagne, 80, Dutch television presenter and radio DJ, chronic obstructive pulmonary disease.
- Robert Nadeau, 81, American science historian.
- P. Namperumalsamy, 85, Indian ophthalmologist.
- Jacques Neirynck, 93, Belgian-Swiss writer, politician and academic, emeritus professor at the EPFL.
- Danny Peacock, 57, Australian rugby league footballer (Western Suburbs, Gold Coast, Bradford Bulls).
- Maksim Pichugin, 50, Russian Olympic cross-country skier (1998).
- Edward Roy Pike, 95, British physicist and mathematician.
- Robert E. Pursley, 97, American Air Force general.
- Ozzie Rodriguez, 81, American playwright, cancer.
- Christopher Rowe, 81, British classical scholar.
- Yaroslav Rushchyshyn, 57, Ukrainian politician, MP (since 2019), traffic collision.
- Lionel Astor Sheridan, 98, English educator and academic.
- Garnett Smith, 87, American actor (Scarface, Frankenstein's Great Aunt Tillie).
- Don Zimmerman, 81, American film editor (Coming Home, Being There, The Prince of Tides), leukemia.

=== 25 ===
- Bayani Casimiro Jr., 57, Filipino comedian and actor.
- P. Dayaratna, 88, Sri Lankan politician, MP (1977–2015).
- Doris Gercke, 88, German writer.
- Sandra Grimes, 80, American intelligence agent.
- Shun-ichi Iwasaki, 98, Japanese engineer, president of Tohoku Institute of Technology (since 1989), pneumonia.
- Gudrun Kalmbach, 88, German mathematician, co-founder of EWM.
- Gerry Kersey, 86, British radio presenter (BBC Radio Sheffield).
- Obafemi Lasode, 69, Nigerian musician, film director (Sango) and producer.
- Georges Lemoine, 91, French politician, three-time deputy, mayor of Chartres (1977–1998).
- Daniel Lentz, 83, American composer, congestive heart failure.
- Bill Morris, 92, American politician, mayor of Shelby County, Tennessee (1978–1994).
- Colm Mulholland, 96, Irish Gaelic footballer (Lavey).
- Sir David Nabarro, 75, British medical academic and international civil servant, heart attack.
- Herbert Pankau, 83, German footballer (SC Empor Rostock, East Germany national team, 1964 Olympics).
- Jan Ivar Pedersen, 89, Norwegian nutritionist.
- Dwight Muhammad Qawi, 72, American boxer, WBC light-heavyweight champion (1981–1983) and WBA cruiserweight champion (1985–1986).
- Abdyl Xhaja, 82, Albanian economist and politician, MP (1996–1997) and deputy prime minister (1991–1992).

=== 26 ===
- Salijon Abdurahmanov, 75, Uzbek journalist.
- Ángel Aldana, 89, Guatemalan Olympic wrestler (1968).
- Martin Bakes, 88, English footballer (Bradford City, Scunthorpe United).
- Daddy Lumba, 60, Ghanaian singer-songwriter and musician.
- Mary DeCongé-Watson, 91, American mathematician.
- Evelio Droz, 88, Puerto Rican Olympic basketball player (1960, 1964).
- Susan Eng, 72, Canadian lawyer, chair of the Toronto Police Services Board (1991–1995).
- Ray French, 85, English rugby league (St. Helens, Widnes) and union (national team) player, complications from dementia.
- Prithvi Man Gurung, 76, Nepali politician, governor of Gandaki Province (2021–2024).
- Willie Irvine, 82, Northern Irish footballer (Burnley, Preston North End, national team).
- Rosemary Kilbourn, 94, Canadian printmaker.
- Jiří Krampol, 87, Czech actor (The Borstal, Malý pitaval z velkého města, Synové a dcery Jakuba skláře).
- Tom Lehrer, 97, American singer-songwriter ("The Elements", "The Old Dope Peddler", "The Vatican Rag"), satirist, and mathematician.
- Piotr Łossowski, 100, Polish historian and academic.
- P. J. Marshall, 91, British historian, president of the Royal Historical Society (1997–2001).
- John McQueen, 82, American sculptor.
- Lutz Mommartz, 91, German experimental filmmaker.
- Okello Oculi, 83, Ugandan poet, author and academic.
- Andrew Oliver, 41, New Zealand man, oldest known person to have survived with Fryns–Aftimos syndrome, pneumonia.
- Qian Yongnian, 91, Chinese diplomat, ambassador to Indonesia (1990–1995).
- Ziad Rahbani, 69, Lebanese composer.
- Ohidur Rahman, 81, Bangladeshi politician, MP (1986–1988).
- John Saladino, 86, American interior designer.
- Dick Schneider, 77, Dutch footballer (Feyenoord, Go Ahead Eagles, national team).
- Süreyya Serdengeçti, 73, Turkish economist, governor of the Central Bank (2001–2006).
- Keith Sorrenson, 92, New Zealand historian.
- Jean Marie Sylla, 42, Guinean footballer (Ergotelis, PAS Giannina, ES Viry-Châtillon).
- Don Wehby, 62, Jamaican conglomerate executive (GraceKennedy) and politician, senator (2007–2009).
- John Werry, 94, New Zealand child and adolescent psychiatrist.
- Leonid Yakovyshyn, 86, Ukrainian agrarian, politician and publicist, MP (1990–1994).

=== 27 ===
- Mikhail Afonin, 68, Russian football manager (Krasnodar-2000, Nizhny Novgorod).
- Atiba Allert, 44, Trinidadian cricketer (national team).
- Parviz Ansari, 71, Iranian-born American physicist.
- Herbert Brandl, 66, Austrian painter (Junge Wilde) and academic (University of Applied Arts Vienna).
- Greg Brannon, 64, American physician and political activist.
- Léonard Dutz, 77, Belgian Olympic wrestler (1968).
- Don Elbaum, 94, American Hall of Fame boxing matchmaker, promoter and manager.
- Alhassan Mohammed Gani, 66, Nigerian academic administrator, vice-chancellor of the FUK (2016–2020).
- Edgar Allan García, 66, Ecuadorian writer.
- Shohei Harumoto, Japanese manga artist (Kirin).
- Eric Heath, 101, New Zealand artist, illustrator and cartoonist.
- Henry Hu, 105, Hong Kong academic administrator and politician, founder of HKSYU, MLC (1976–1983) and MUC (1965–1981).
- Mick Kearin, 82, Irish footballer (Bohemians, Shamrock Rovers, national team).
- Richard Lee, 62, American marijuana rights activist.
- Horst Mahler, 89, German lawyer, convicted Holocaust denier and political activist, founding member of the Red Army Faction.
- Serhiy Maksymenko, 83, Ukrainian psychologist.
- Brian McHale, 73, American academic, metastatic melanoma.
- John Miszuk, 84, Polish-born Canadian ice hockey player (Detroit Red Wings, Chicago Black Hawks, Philadelphia Flyers).
- Edward O'Grady, 75, Irish National Hunt racehorse trainer.
- Hassan Ouakrim, 85, Moroccan-born American dancer, choreographer and art collector.
- Nancy Poore, 85, American printmaker and activist.
- Nuno Portas, 90, Portuguese architect.
- Lou Sebert, 89, American politician, member of the South Dakota House of Representatives (1999–2006).
- Judith Shuval, 99, Israeli sociologist.
- Jerzy Sztwiertnia, 78, Polish film director (The Clan, Plebania) and screenwriter.
- Celso Valli, 75, Italian composer.
- Michael Waldman, 83, British palaeontologist.
- Yuri Yampolsky, 78, Ukrainian astronomer.

=== 28 ===
- Wallis Annenberg, 86, American philanthropist, president of the Annenberg Foundation.
- Marcelo Beraba, 74, Brazilian journalist, co-founder of ABRAJI.
- Leda Bisol, 100, Brazilian linguist.
- Jack Bloomfield, 94, American baseball player (Kintetsu Buffaloes) and coach (Chicago Cubs, San Diego Padres).
- Hein Boele, 85, Dutch actor (De Luizenmoeder) and voice actor.
- Roger K. Burton, 76, British creative businessman, acute myeloid leukaemia.
- Michel Callon, 79–80, French sociologist and engineer.
- Laura Dahlmeier, 31, German biathlete, double Olympic champion (2018), landslide.
- Cécile Dionne, 91, Canadian media personality, member of the Dionne quintuplets.
- Raffaele Fiore, 71, Italian militant (Red Brigades).
- Amelia Freedman, 84, British arts administrator (Nash Ensemble).
- John L. Gainer, 87, American chemical engineer, co-founder of Diffusion Pharmaceuticals.
- Salvatore Gionta, 94, Italian water polo player, Olympic champion (1960).
- Mildred Barnes Griggs, 83, American academic (University of Illinois at Urbana-Champaign).
- Kwik Kian Gie, 90, Indonesian economist and politician, minister of national development planning (2001–2004), coordinating minister for economic affairs (1999–2000), and deputy speaker of the PCA (1999).
- Humphrey Maris, 86, British-born American physicist.
- Morton Mintz, 103, American investigative journalist (The Washington Post, St. Louis Star-Times, St. Louis Globe-Democrat).
- Gerry Morrow, 75, Martinique-born Canadian professional wrestler.
- Alejandra Oliveras, 47, Argentine boxer, stroke.
- Bonnie D. Parkin, 84, American religious leader, Relief Society general president (2002–2007).
- Iftiquar Uddin Talukder Pintu, 60, Bangladeshi politician, MP (2014–2019, 2024).
- Ryne Sandberg, 65, American Hall of Fame baseball player (Chicago Cubs) and manager (Philadelphia Phillies), prostate cancer.
- Sean Sheehy, 73, Irish footballer (Dundalk, Thurles Town, Shelbourne).
- Hassan Sobir, 73, Maldivian politician and diplomat, member of the People's Majlis (2000–2005), cancer.
- Rosita Velázquez, 74, Puerto Rican singer (Moliendo Vidrio) and comedian.
- I. William Zartman, 93, American academic.
- Stepan Zhiryakov, 77, Russian politician, senator (2013–2018).
- Joseph Ziegler, 71, Canadian actor (Side Effects, Black Harbour, The Grid) and theatre director.

=== 29 ===
- Alon Abutbul, 60, Israeli actor (The Dark Knight Rises, London Has Fallen, Rambo III).
- Allan Ahlberg, 87, British children's author (Burglar Bill, The Jolly Postman).
- Thomas J. Balkany, 77, American ear surgeon.
- Xuan Bello, 60, Spanish poet and writer.
- Tommy Brooks, 71, American boxing trainer (Evander Holyfield, Mike Tyson), colon cancer.
- Paul Coe, 76, Australian Aboriginal rights activist.
- Tom Cousins, 93, American real estate developer, philanthropist and basketball executive, owner of the Atlanta Hawks (1968–1977).
- Lena Cronqvist, 86, Swedish painter and sculptor.
- Paul Mario Day, 69, English singer (Iron Maiden, More, The Sweet), cancer.
- Ruth Dayhoff, 73, American physician and medical bioinformatician.
- Meghnad Desai, Baron Desai, 85, Indian-born British economist and politician, member of the House of Lords (since 1991).
- Jean-Pierre Egger, 81, Swiss Olympic shot putter (1976, 1980).
- Gerard Endenburg, 92, Dutch businessman (Sociocracy Circle Organisation Method).
- Sir Michael Hill, 86, New Zealand jeweller, founder of Michael Hill Jeweller.
- Ian Jenkins, 84, Scottish politician, MSP (1999–2003).
- Machiel Kiel, 87, Dutch professor of art history and specialist in Ottoman architecture.
- Bill Krisher, 89, American football player (Pittsburgh Steelers, Dallas Texans).
- André Ladner, 63, Swiss footballer (Grasshopper Club, Basel, national team).
- Mark Lazarus, 86, English footballer (QPR, Leyton Orient).
- João Leal Neto, 87, Brazilian football player (América SP, São Paulo), manager (Ittihad Kalba), and referee.
- Jon Harlan Livezey, 86, American politician, member of the Maryland House of Delegates (1970–1974).
- Margaret Maritz, South African longevity claimant.
- Carmel Muscat, 63, Maltese Olympic cyclist (1980), traffic collision.
- Cecil Pringle, 81–82, Irish Anglican priest, Archdeacon of Clogher (1989–2014).
- Geert Reuten, 79, Dutch economist and politician, senator (2007–2015, 2018–2019).
- Sir Robin Ross, 85, British Royal Marines officer, complications from Parkinson's disease.
- Rakel Surlien, 81, Norwegian politician, minister of the environment (1983–1986).
- Helmut Swiczinsky, 81, Austrian architect.
- David Tartakover, 81, Israeli graphic designer and political activist, complications from Parkinson's disease.
- Robert Major Walker, 81, American politician, mayor of Vicksburg, Mississippi (1988–2001).
- Dimitrios Zarzavatsidis, 69, Greek Olympic weightlifter (1980), cancer.

=== 30 ===
- Rebekah Baptiste, 10, American student of elementary school, blunt force trauma.
- Ross Adler, 80, Australian business executive.
- David Argue, 65, Australian actor (Razorback, Hercules Returns, Gallipoli), cancer.
- David Wilson Barnes, 52, American actor (Hell on Wheels, The Son, Miss Sloane), cancer.
- Viktor Borshch, 76, Russian volleyball player, Olympic bronze medalist (1972).
- William K. Brehm, 96, American businessman and philanthropist, assistant secretary of the army (manpower and reserve affairs) (1968–1970) and assistant secretary of defense for legislative affairs (1976–1977).
- Nicholas Clapp, 89, American filmmaker and writer, complications from a stroke.
- Hugh Dickinson, 95, English Anglican clergyman, dean of Salisbury (1986–1996).
- Marina Donato, 76, Italian television producer and author.
- T. S. Ellis III, 85, American jurist, judge of the U.S. District Court for Eastern Virginia (since 1987), complications from COVID-19.
- Alan Finney, 91, English footballer (Sheffield Wednesday, Doncaster Rovers, Alfreton Town).
- Mick Gadsby, 77, English footballer (Hartlepool, York City, Notts County).
- Marianne Jahn, 82, Austrian Olympic alpine skier (1960, 1964).
- Lotfy Labib, 77, Egyptian actor (The Embassy in the Building, Keda Reda, Assal Eswed).
- Pat Lesser Harbottle, 91, American golfer.
- Jerzy Makarczyk, 87, Polish judge.
- T. N. Manoharan, 69, Indian chartered accountant, president of the ICAI (2006–2007) and chairman of Canara Bank (2015–2020).
- Johnny Mayes, 78, Australian rugby league player (Eastern Suburbs, Manly-Warringah, national team), brain cancer.
- Linda McGill, 79, Australian Hall of Fame Olympic swimmer (1964), emphysema.
- Dennis Mendyk, 90, American college football and baseball player.
- Rodrigo Moya, 91, Mexican photojournalist.
- George Nigh, 98, American politician and academic administrator, governor (1963, 1979–1987) and twice lieutenant governor of Oklahoma, president of the University of Central Oklahoma (1992–1997).
- Matthew Christopher Pietras, 40, American financial fraudster. (death announced on this date)
- Felipe de la Pozas, 91, Cuban Olympic basketball player (1952).
- Steve Regal, 73, American professional wrestler (AWA, WWA).
- Adalberto Paulo da Silva, 96, Brazilian Roman Catholic prelate, bishop of Viana (1975–1995) and auxiliary bishop of Fortaleza (1995–2004).
- H. Catherine W. Skinner, 94, American geologist and mineralogist.
- Per Terje Vold, 80, Norwegian civil servant.
- Sylvia Young, 86, British theatre teacher, founder of the Sylvia Young Theatre School.
- Gail D. Zimmerman, 92, American politician, member of the Wyoming House of Representatives (1985–1989) and Senate (1989–1999).

=== 31 ===
- Adriana Asti, 94, Italian actress (Rocco and His Brothers, Accattone, The Phantom of Liberty).
- Sebastian Barrie, 55, American football player (Green Bay Packers, Arizona Cardinals, San Diego Chargers), cancer.
- Léandre Bergeron, 91, Canadian writer, historian and cartoonist.
- Geneviève Brunet, 95, French actress (The City of Lost Children, Lovers on a Tightrope, It Happened in Aden).
- John F. Callinan, 90, American jurist, judge on the New Jersey Superior Court (1982–2002).
- Sir Graham Day, 92, British-Canadian business executive (British Shipbuilders, Austin Rover Group, Cadbury Schweppes).
- John Deveau, 63, Canadian politician, Nova Scotia MLA (1998–1999).
- Jan Dukszta, 93, Canadian politician, MPP (1971–1981).
- Robert W. Fleming, 97, Canadian-American healthcare executive.
- Syed Tanveer-ul-Hassan Gillani, 67, Pakistani politician.
- Jesto, 40, Italian rapper, heart attack.
- Flaco Jiménez, 86, American musician (Texas Tornados, Los Super Seven).
- Peter Kaack, 84, German footballer (VfR Neumünster, Eintracht Braunschweig).
- Béla Kathi, 46, Hungarian bodybuilder, traffic collision.
- Gerhard Körner, 83, German football player (Vorwärts Berlin), Olympic bronze medalist (1964), and manager. (death announced on this date)
- Ludwig Lang, 79, German footballer (Borussia Neunkirchen).
- Jonathan Lloyd, 76, British composer.
- Lothar Matthes, 78, German Olympic diver (1968, 1972).
- Yasmeen Murshed, 80, Bangladeshi political adviser and teacher, founder of Scholastica.
- Vladimir Ploskikh, 88, Kyrgyz archaeologist and historian.
- Georg Riesch, 92, Swiss Olympic ice hockey player (1956).
- Chris Riley, 70, Australian Catholic priest, founder of Youth Off The Streets.
- Norman Robinson, 88, South African karateka.
- Seán Rocks, 64, Irish broadcaster and actor (Dear Sarah, Go Now).
- Derk Sauer, 72, Dutch journalist and media proprietor, founder of The Moscow Times, injuries sustained in a sailing accident.
- Suryadharma Ali, 68, Indonesian politician, minister of religious affairs (2009–2014).
- Andrey Terekhov, 75, Russian mathematician and computer scientist.
- Diane Wray Williams, 87, American businesswoman and politician, member of the Minnesota House of Representatives (1989–1991).
- Robert Wilson, 83, American experimental theatre director and playwright (Einstein on the Beach), founder of The Watermill Center.
- Marlena Zagoni, 74, Romanian rower, Olympic bronze medallist (1980).
- Edward Zakrzewski, 60, American convicted murderer, execution by lethal injection.
