= Trevor Lloyd =

Trevor Lloyd may refer to:

- Trevor Lloyd (artist) (1863–1937), New Zealand artist, illustrator and cartoonist
- Trevor Lloyd (geographer) (1906–1995), Canadian geographer, Hans Egede Medal and Massey Medal recipient
- Trevor Lloyd (rugby union) (1924–2015), Welsh international rugby union player
- Trevor Lloyd (priest) (born 1938), Anglican priest and author
- Trevor Lloyd (footballer) (1952–2025), Australian rules football player for Fitzroy
