= Ronald T. Borchardt =

American pharmaceutical chemist (1944–2025)

- Born: Ronald Terrance Borchardt; February 18, 1944; Wausau, Wisconsin, U.S.
- Died: July 15, 2025 (aged 81); Lawrence, Kansas, U.S.
- Education: University of Wisconsin–Madison; University of Kansas
- Occupation: Pharmaceutical chemist
- Scientific career
- Fields: Medicinal chemistry
- Thesis: A stereochemical approach to the adrenergic system (1970)
- Doctoral advisor: Edward E. Smissman

Ronald Terrance Borchardt (February 18, 1944 – July 15, 2025) was an American pharmaceutical chemist.

== Life and career ==
Borchardt was born in Wausau, Wisconsin, on February 18, 1944, the son of Martin and Helen Borchardt. He attended the University of Wisconsin–Madison, earning his BS degree in pharmacy in 1967. He also attended the University of Kansas, earning his PhD degree in medicinal chemistry in 1970. After earning his degrees, he worked as a postdoctoral fellow at the National Institutes of Health.

Borchardt served as a professor in the department of pharmaceutical chemistry at the University of Kansas from 1971 to 2015. During his years as a professor, in 1981, he was named the Solon E. Summerfield distinguished professor.

== Personal life and death ==
In 1966, Borchardt married Pamela Bohl. Their marriage lasted until Borchardt's death in 2025.

Borchardt died in Lawrence, Kansas, on July 15, 2025, at the age of 81.
