= John McQueen (sculptor) =

American artist, sculptor (1943–2025)

John McQueen (Jan. 21, 1943 – July 26, 2025) was an American sculptor who worked with natural materials like bark, vine, and branches.

== Early life and education ==
McQueen was born in 1943 in Oakland, Illinois. In 1971, he graduated with a bachelor's degree from the University of South Florida in Tampa, Florida. He then studied at the Tyler School of Art at Temple University, where he received a master of fine arts (MFA) degree in 1975.

== Career ==
He received fellowships from the National Endowment for the Arts in 1977, 1979, and 1986. His work is in the collection of the Smithsonian American Art Museum.

== Death ==
He died of pneumonia on July 26, 2025 in Schenectady, New York at the age of 82.
