= Vinzenz Ziswiler =

Swiss zoologist (1935–2025)

Vinzenz Johannes Ziswiler (1 February 1935 – 5 July 2025), also known as Vincent Ziswiler, was a Swiss zoologist and university lecturer.

== Life and career ==
Ziswiler was born in Lucerne on 1 February 1935. He worked under Hans Burla as a curator at the Zoological Museum of the University of Zurich. In 1967 Ziswiler became a private lecturer, in 1972 an associate professor and in 1981 a professor at the University of Zurich. From 1984 to 1987 he was President of the Research Commission of the University.

He had research stays at Harvard University, the American Museum of Natural History in New York and the National Museum of Natural History in Leiden. He also undertook research trips to Lake Kivu, Papua New Guinea, New Caledonia and the Southwest Pacific archipelagos.

Ziswiler died on 5 July 2025, at the age of 90.
