= Mick Gadsby =

English footballer (1947–2025)

Personal information
- Full name: Michael David Gadsby
- Date of birth: 1 August 1947
- Place of birth: Oswestry, England
- Date of death: 30 July 2025 (aged 77)
- Place of death: England
- Position: Goalkeeper

Youth career
- Ashbourne

Senior career*
Years	Team	Apps	(Gls)
1968–1969	Notts County	11	(0)
1969–1971	York City	13	(0)
1970	→ Grimsby Town (loan)	2	(0)
1970–1971	→ Bradford City (loan)	6	(0)
1971–1972	Hartlepool	21	(0)
- Dover Town
Total		53	(0)
- * Club domestic league appearances and goals

Michael David Gadsby (1 August 1947 – 30 July 2025) was an English professional footballer who played as a goalkeeper in the Football League for Notts County, York City, Grimsby Town, Bradford City and Hartlepool.

== Career ==
Born in Oswestry, Gadsby played for Ashbourne, Notts County, York City, Grimsby Town, Bradford City, Hartlepool and Dover Town.

For Bradford City he made six appearances in the Football League.

== Sources ==
- Frost, Terry (1988). Bradford City A Complete Record 1903-1988. Breedon Books Sport. ISBN 0-907969-38-0.
