= Claude Roire =

French journalist (1939–2025)

- Born: 20 May 1939
- Died: 15 July 2025 (aged 86)
- Occupation: Journalist

Claude Roire (20 May 1939 – 15 July 2025) was a French journalist.

== Life and career ==
Born on 20 May 1939, Roire was the son of radio host Jean Roire. He was a member of the Union of Communist Students and joined the newspaper Libération in the 1950s. He then began working for Le Canard enchaîné in April 1976. He covered the Murder of Robert Boulin in 1979 and the Chaumet affair in 1987. In the 1990s, he revealed the salary of businessman Jacques Calvet, which led to a condemnation from the European Court of Human Rights. He retired from journalism in 2008.

Claude Roire died on 15 July 2025, at the age of 86.
