= Gami Astoingué Richard =

Chadian film director (1991–2025)

- Born: 3 April 1991; N'Djamena, Chad
- Died: 14 July 2025 (aged 34); N'Djamena, Chad
- Education: University of N'Djamena; University of Dschang
- Occupation: Film director

Gami Astoingué Richard (3 April 1991 – 14 July 2025) was a Chadian film director.

== Life and career ==
Born in N'Djamena on 3 April 1991, Richard graduated from the University of N'Djamena before earned a Master of Philosophy from the University of Dschang. He notably directed the Anaïs film series alongside actress Brigitte Tchanegue. In 2025, his film Le rendez-vous du siècle was presented at the Panafrican Film and Television Festival of Ouagadougou in the Yenanga co-production category.

According to his family, Richard's health deteriorated significantly after his return from Burkina Faso. He died in N'Djamena on 14 July 2025, at the age of 34.
