= Sabine Klamroth =

German lawyer and author (1933–2025)

Sabine Klamroth (10 August 1933 – 7 July 2025) was a German lawyer and author. Sabine Klamroth studied languages and law in Heidelberg, Berlin and Munich. She worked for a long time as a lawyer in Heidelberg and served as the editor-in-chief of various legal journals. After German reunification in 1991, she returned to her hometown of Halberstadt (Saxony-Anhalt). Her book "Erst wenn der Mond bei Seckbachs steht" ("Only When the Moon Rises Above the Seckbachs' House") about the Halberstadt's lost Jewish community before and during the Nazi era was published and internationally recognized in 2006. A second edition was published in 2014.

Klamroth died on 7 July 2025, at the age of 91.
