= Louis Yinda =

Cameroonian businessman (1939 or 1940 – 2025)

- Born: 1939 or 1940; Ngompen, French Cameroon
- Died: 6 July 2025 (aged 85)
- Citizenship: Cameroonian
- Education: Collège Libermann
- Occupation: Businessman
- Known for: Former CEO of Cameroonian sugar company Sosucam
- Political party: Cameroon People's Democratic Movement

Louis Yinda (1939 or 1940 – 6 July 2025) was a Cameroonian businessman. He started his career as a civil servant and became CEO of the Cameroon sugar company Sosuca. He was also served on the central committee of the Cameroon People's Democratic Movement.

== Early life ==
Born in 1939 or 1940 in Ngompen, French Cameroon Yinda attended a Catholic school in Pouma and the Collège Libermann in Douala. He then studied in Aix-en-Provence and Paris.

== Career ==
He returned to Cameroon in 1969 and worked as a civil servant for the Ministry of Industrial and Commercial Development. He also served as secretary-general of Electricité du Cameroun and oversaw the merger between Edc de Powercam and Enelcam to create the national Cameroonian electric company, Sonel.

He first joined the sugar company Sosucam in November 1975, moving up in the ranks until his service as CEO of the company from 2000 to 2018.

He also advocated for the Institut Universitaire Louis Yinda, created by the Cameroonian government in 2014.

== Politics ==
In the political realm, he served on the central committee of the Cameroon People's Democratic Movement.

== Death ==
Louis Yinda died on 6 July 2025, at the age of 85.

== Recognition ==
- Knight of the Legion of Honour
- Pro Ecclesia et Pontifice
