= Bob Hutchison (athlete) =

Canadian sprinter (1931–2025)

Personal information
- Full name: Robert Bruce McDiarmid Hutchison
- Nationality: Canadian
- Born: 2 June 1931 Victoria, British Columbia, Canada
- Died: 15 July 2025 (aged 94) Victoria, British Columbia, Canada

Sport
- Sport: Sprinting
- Event: 100 metres

Robert Bruce McDiarmid Hutchison (2 June 1931 – 15 July 2025) was a Canadian sprinter. He competed in the men's 100 metres at the 1952 Summer Olympics.

Hutchison died on 15 July 2025, at the age of 94.
