= A. Derek Guthrie =

Canadian lawyer and judge (1935–2025)

A. Derek Guthrie (December 16, 1935 – July 12, 2025) was a Canadian lawyer and judge who was Justice with the Quebec Superior Court, Canada.

Guthrie was a graduate of the McGill University Faculty of Law (BCL 1960), where he served as Editor-in-chief of the McGill Law Journal. He died on July 12, 2025, at the age of 89.
