= Álamo Oliveira =

Portuguese poet (1945–2025)

- Born: José Henrique Álamo Oliveira; 2 May 1945; Raminho, Terceira
- Died: 6 July 2025 (aged 80)
- Occupation(s): Writer, poet

José Henrique Álamo Oliveira (2 May 1945 – 6 July 2025) was a Portuguese poet and writer.

== Life and career ==
Oliveira was born in the parish of Raminho, on the island of Terceira, archipelago of the Azores. Having begun his studies at the Episcopal Seminary of Angra, he left the seminary without completing. He always worked in several cultural departments of the state, later retiring in 2001.

His most notable works include the novel 'I don't like chocolates anymore' and 'Solidão da Casa do Regalo'.

On 10 June 2010, he was awarded the degree of Commander of the Order of Merit.

Álamo Oliveira died on 6 July 2025, at the age of 80.
