= Douglas Loeffler =

American politician (1932–2025)

Douglas J. Loeffler
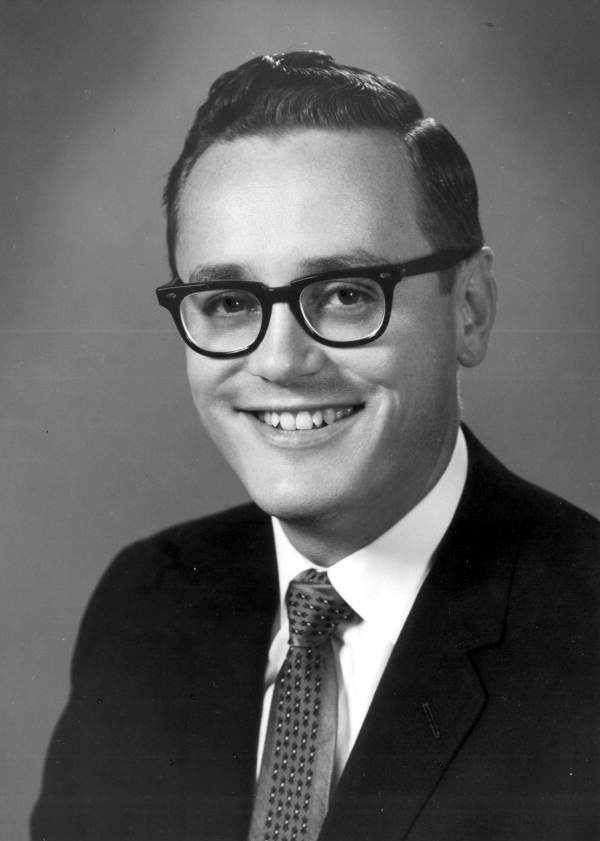

Member of the Florida House of Representatives from the Pinellas County district
- In office 1961–1964

Personal details
- Born: May 14, 1932 Detroit, Michigan, U.S.
- Died: July 2, 2025 (aged 93) Oak Ridge, Tennessee, U.S.
- Party: Republican
- Spouse: Patricia Bailey (m. 1953; died 2024)
- Children: 3
- Education: University of Florida
- Occupation: attorney

Douglas Jay Loeffler (May 14, 1932 – July 2, 2025) was an American politician who served in the Florida House of Representatives from 1961 to 1964, representing Pinellas County, and was a county judge in Pinellas from 1966 to 1970. Loeffler died on July 2, 2025, at the age of 93.
