= Joseph A. Capineri =

American politician (1929–2025)

Joseph A. Capineri

Joseph A. Capineri (May 2, 1929 – July 9, 2025) was an American politician. He was a member of the Rhode Island House of Representatives from 1957 to 1980. He died on July 9, 2025, at the age of 96.
