= Edgar Allan García =

Ecuadorian writer (1958–2025)

Edgar Allan García Rivadeneira (December 17, 1958 – July 27, 2025) was an Ecuadorian writer.

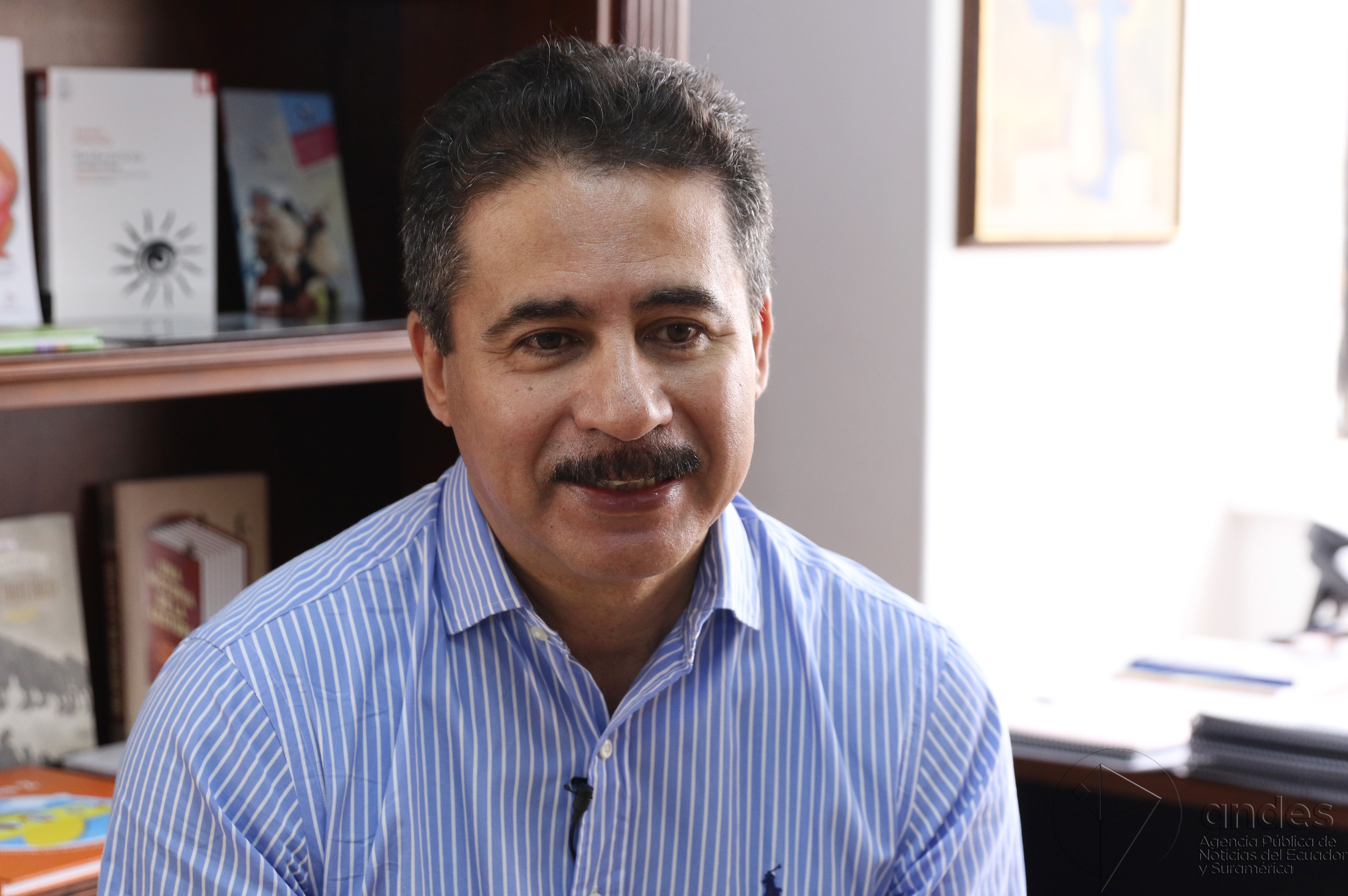
Edgar Allan Garcia

== Life and career ==
Garcia was born in Guayaquil on December 17, 1958. Throughout his career as a writer, he published 74 books in the genres of short stories, poetry, novels, essays and children's literature.

He was the director of the José de la Cuadra National Book and Reading Plan of Ecuador.

García died on July 27, 2025, at the age of 66.
