= Serhiy Maksymenko =

Ukrainian psychologist (1941–2025)

Serhiy Maksymenko

Serhiy Dmytrovych Maksymenko (Ukrainian: Сергій Дмитрович Максименко; 15 December 1941 – 27 July 2025) was a Ukrainian psychologist.

== Life and career ==
Maksymenko was born 15 December 1941 in the village of Zapruddia, then in Rokytne Raion, Kyiv Oblast.

Throughout his life, he was awarded a number of titles, including Full Academician-Secretary of the National Academy of Pedagogical Sciences of Ukraine.

He was named an Honored Worker of Science and Technology of Ukraine, and laureate of the State Prize of Ukraine in the field of science and technology.

Maksymenko died on 27 July 2025, at the age of 83.
