= Viktor Safronov (painter) =

Russian painter (1932–2025)

- Виктор Сафронов
- Born: Viktor Alekseevich Safronov; 25 January 1932; Nizhny Novgorod, Russian SFSR, USSR
- Died: 20 July 2025 (aged 93); Ulyanovsk, Russia
- Education: Gorky Art College
- Occupation: Painter

Viktor Alekseevich Safronov (Russian: Виктор Алексеевич Сафронов; 25 January 1932 – 20 July 2025) was a Russian painter. He was a recipient of the Honored Artist of the RSFSR (1970).

Safronov died in Ulyanovsk on 20 July 2025, at the age of 93.
