= Lee Mummery =

New Zealand cricketer

Personal information
- Full name: Ernest Lee Mummery
- Born: 26 November 1935; Whanganui, New Zealand
- Died: 19 July 2025 (aged 89); Whanganui, New Zealand
- Batting: Right-handed
- Bowling: Slow left-arm orthodox
- Source: Cricinfo, 29 October 2020

Ernest Lee Mummery (26 November 1935 – 19 July 2025) was a New Zealand cricketer, table tennis player and school principal.

Mummery played in five first-class matches for Central Districts in the 1961/62 season. Chiefly a slow left-arm orthodox spin bowler, his best figures were 4 for 152 against Canterbury in the Plunket Shield in January 1962.

Mummery was also a noted table tennis player. He was a principal at a primary school in Whanganui.

Mummery died in Whanganui on 19 July 2025, at the age of 89. He and his wife Joy were married for 67 years.
