= George T. Warren II =

American politician (1937–2025)

Member of the Georgia State Senate from the 43rd district
- In office 1973–1976

Personal details
- Born: May 18, 1937 DeKalb County, Georgia, U.S.
- Died: July 13, 2025 (aged 88) Madison, Georgia, U.S.
- Party: Republican
- Education: Georgia State University

George Thomas Warren II (May 18, 1937 – July 13, 2025) was an American politician. He served as a Republican member for the 43rd district of the Georgia State Senate.

== Life and career ==
Warren was born in DeKalb County, Georgia, on May 18, 1937. He attended Georgia State University.

He was a real estate and insurance broker.

Warren served in the Georgia State Senate from 1973 to 1976, representing the 43rd district.

Warren died in Madison, Georgia, on July 13, 2025, at the age of 88.
