= Francesco Tagliarini =

Italian politician (1935–2025)

Member of the Chamber of Deputies of Italy for Brescia
- In office 24 February 1971 – 24 May 1972

Personal details
- Born: 5 November 1935; Lecco, Italy
- Died: 13 July 2025 (aged 89); Bergamo, Italy
- Political party: DC
- Occupation: Lawyer

Francesco Tagliarini (5 November 1935 – 13 July 2025) was an Italian politician. A member of Christian Democracy, he served in the Chamber of Deputies of Italy from 1971 to 1972.

Tagliarini died in Bergamo on 13 July 2025, at the age of 89.
