= Tetiana Sheliha =

Ukrainian actress (1948–2025)

- Тетяна Шеліга
- Born: Tetiana Leonardivna Sheliha; 10 December 1948; Kyiv, Ukrainian SSR, USSR
- Died: 3 July 2025 (aged 76); Kyiv, Ukraine
- Citizenship: Ukraine
- Occupation: Actress
- Years active: 1972–2021

Tetiana Leonardivna Sheliha (Ukrainian: Тетяна Леонардівна Шеліга; 10 December 1948 – 3 July 2025) was a Ukrainian film and stage actress.

== Life and career ==
Sheliha was born in Kyiv on 10 December 1948.

Sheliha didn't get into a theatre college the first time. She worked as an assistant director in the children's editorial office of Ukrainian television for a year, and then went there to apply again. In 1972, after graduating from the Nemirovich-Danchenko Moscow Art Theatre School-Studio at the Moscow Art Theatre School, where she studied in the workshop of Professor V.K. Monyukov, she went to Sevastopol. There she worked for 23 years at the Sevastopol Drama Theatre. From 1995 to 2010 she was an actress at the Lesya Ukrainka National Academic Theater of Russian Drama.

In 2010, Sheliha was awarded the title of Honored Artist of Ukraine.

Sheliha is best known for the television series "When We Are Home", in which she played the role of the wife of Stanislav Boklan's character. She was an actress with a sharp character.

Her daughter announced that Sheliha had died in Kyiv, on 3 July 2025, at the age of 76.
