= José Cestero (painter) =

Dominican painter (1937–2025)

- Born: 19 March 1937; Santo Domingo, Dominica
- Died: 16 July 2025 (aged 88)
- Occupations: Draftsman, painter

José Cestero (19 March 1937 – 16 July 2025) was a Dominican draftsman and painter.

== Life and career ==
He studied at the National School of Fine Arts of the Dominican Republic (ENBA), graduating in 1954. Throughout his career, he developed a distinctive style that integrated urban and spiritual elements into his works, characterized by his use of drawing and painting.

Cestero was a student of renowned masters such as Joseph Fulop, Gilberto Hernández Ortega, and José Gausachs. A year later, he moved to the United States, where he continued his artistic training and became considered one of the most outstanding draftsmen in that field.

In 1960, he returned to the Dominican Republic, and after the overthrow of Rafael Leónidas Trujillo's dictatorship, Cestero combined his creative talent with that of visual artists Silvano Lora, José Ramírez Conde, Iván Tovar, and Ada Balcácer, forming the avant-garde group known as "Art and Liberation."

He received several awards both in the Dominican Republic and abroad and participated in several international exhibitions, including the 17th International Painting Festival at the Château-Musée de Cagnes-sur-Mer, in France, and the First Italian-Latin American Biennial of Graphic Arts, held in Rome.

His artistic production was recognized both in the country and abroad, and in 2015 he received the National Prize for Plastic Arts, the main recognition granted by the Dominican State in that field. His work is part of the national artistic heritage and continues to be studied and exhibited in various cultural spaces.

On 16 July 2025, Cestero died at his residence, at the age of 88.

== Exhibitions ==
Group exhibitions (Santo Domingo, Dominican Republic)

- 2004 'Tropical Paintings Paint Their Country'
- 2003 'Tropical Paintings Paint Their Country'
- 2002 'Dominican Proverbs', sponsored by Banco del Reservas Individual

Exhibitions (Santo Domingo, Dominican Republic)

- 2005 'Wanderings of Don Quixote', Dominican Museum of Modern Art (MAM)
- 2005 'Tribute and Landscape', French Embassy
- 2001 'Six Faces', El Espacio Art Gallery
- 2000 'Two Faces', El Espacio Art Gallery
- 1999 'Ten Faces', El Espacio Art Gallery Space
