= Klaus-Jürgen Holzapfel =

German publisher (1930–2025)

insert a caption here

Klaus-Jürgen Holzapfel (German: [ˈklaʊs ˈjʏrɡən ˈhɔlt͡sˌap͡fl̩]; 18 May 1930 – 15 July 2025) was a German publisher.

== Life and career ==
Holzapfel was born in Berlin on 18 May 1930, as the son of the publisher Adolf Holzapfel. After his death in 1958 he took over the Neue Darmstädter Verlagsanstalt (NDV) founded by his father. Under his leadership, the company increasingly specialized in political manuals. In 1971 the company moved to Rheinbreitbach.

In addition to Kürschners Volkshandbuch Deutscher Bundestag, handbooks on the German state parliaments and the European Parliament were published. In 1990, a popular handbook with the biographies of the members of the first freely elected Volkskammer was published. In cooperation with the school television of the Westdeutscher Rundfunk (WDR), NDV published accompanying material. In 1998, it launched the biographical database politikus.de on the Internet.

At the beginning of the 2000s he gradually retired from the operative business of the publishing house and handed over the management to his son Andreas. He lived in Linz am Rhein.

Holzapfel died in Linz am Rhein on 15 July 2025, at the age of 95.

== Honors ==
- 2011: Order of Merit of the Federal Republic of Germany for his great contributions to political education.
