= Florência (singer) =

Portuguese singer (1938–2025)

Florência

Florência Martins da Cunha Vieira (12 September 1938 – 18 July 2025) was a Portuguese singer. She began as Florência de Fátima, then Florência Rodrigues, and then simply Florência.

== Life and career ==
Florência was born in Porto on 12 September 1938. Florência began performing at Rádio Clube do Norte and in 1952, at just thirteen years old, she won the Queen of the Singers contest in Porto, sponsored by the Jornal de Notícias. She won the Queen of the Singers of Portugal contest in Lisbon.

In 1953, she left for Brazil with her family. In this country, she worked on radio and television, and performed at the most prestigious venues; she participated in festivals, gained fame, and collected awards. TV Tupi awarded her the "Best of the Week" award. Her first LP was released by Todamérica. She recorded her first albums under the name "Florência de Fátima". Among them was "Recado a Lisboa", which she received from her friend João Villaret.

In 1966, a contract to perform at the Estoril Casino, Espinho Casino, and Póvoa de Varzim Casino brought her to Portugal permanently. Florência began another stage in her artistic career, beyond fado, singing light music and folklore.

She recorded for the Ofir label.

Florência died in Lisbon on 18 July 2025, at the age of 86. She had lived at Casa do Artista from 2023.

== Discography ==
=== Compilations ===
- "The Best of the Best" Collection (n.º 38) (1994, CD, Movieplay)
