= Hassan Ouakrim =

Moroccan-born American dancer (died 2025)

- Ouakrim in 1968
- Born: 1939 or 1940; Aday, Morocco
- Died: July 27, 2025 (aged 85); Manhattan, New York, U.S.
- Occupation(s): Dancer, choreographer, art collector

Hassan Ouakrim (1939 or 1940 – July 27, 2025) was a Moroccan-born American dancer, choreographer and art collector. He was best known as the artistic director who taught traditional Moroccan dances at La MaMa Experimental Theatre Club.

In 2017, he wrote his autobiography Memoir of a Berber: Brian Jones Of The Rolling Stones In Jahjouka, the Beat Generation in Morocco, published by Fulton Books.

Ouakrim died on July 27, 2025, in Manhattan, New York, at the age of 85.
