= Gheorghe Șevcișin =

Moldovan conductor (1946–2025)

Șevcișin

Gheorghe Șevcișin (1 July 1945 – 11 July 2025) was a Moldovan conductor and musician.

== Life and career ==
Șevcișin was born on 1 July 1945. In 1996 he founded the Orchestra of the Center of Culture and Art Ginta Latina.

He was awarded the Honored Man of the Republic of Moldova in 1989, People's Artist of Moldova in 2010 and the Order of Labour Glory in 2000.

Șevcișin died on 11 July 2025, aged 80.
