= Marilynne Morgan =

British lawyer and public servant (1946–2025)

Marilynne Ann Morgan, CB (née Williams; 22 June 1946 – 12 July 2025) was a British barrister and senior civil servant.

== Life and career ==
After studying history at Bedford College, London (now part of Royal Holloway, University of London), she joined the Foreign Office, before being called by Middle Temple in 1972. She held a succession of posts in the government legal service, rising to be Director-General of the Law and Special Policy Group at the Department for Work and Pensions. In this role, she was one of the most senior civil servants reporting directly to the Permanent Secretary, in the largest UK government department with over 100,000 employees at the time.

Morgan was trustee of the Alzheimer's Society between 2003 and 2009, trustee of the Alzheimer's Brain Bank between 2005 and 2011, and non-executive director of Treasury Solicitor's Department between 2004 and 2010. She was Chairman, Friends of Buckinghamshire's Historic Churches and Chairman of Trustees, University Women's Club. She was also an officer of the Middle Temple, serving as Master of the Kitchen.

She was appointed a Companion of the Most Honourable Order of the Bath (CB) in 1996, one of the United Kingdom's most senior orders of chivalry.

Morgan died after a long illness on 12 July 2025, at the age of 79.
