= Alexander Tantlevsky =

Russian art historian (1930–2025)

- Born: Alexander Semyonovich Tantlevsky; 17 January 1930; Kharkiv, Ukrainian SSR, USSR
- Died: 16 July 2025 (aged 95); Moscow, Russia
- Occupation: Art historian

Alexander Semyonovich Tantlevsky (Russian: Александр Семёнович Тантлевский; 17 January 1930 – 16 July 2025), also known as A.S. Tantlevsky, was a Russian art historian. He was a recipient of the Medal "Defender of a Free Russia" (1993).

Tantlevsky died in Moscow on 16 July 2025, at the age of 95.
