= Ray Millington =

Australian rules footballer (1932–2025)

Personal information
- Full name: Raymond Millington
- Born: 15 May 1932
- Died: 19 July 2025 (aged 93)
- Original team: Eastern Suburbs
- Height: 178 cm (5 ft 10 in)
- Weight: 76 kg (168 lb)

Playing career
Years	Club	Games (Goals)
1952	Fitzroy	2 (0)

Raymond Millington (15 May 1932 – 19 July 2025) was an Australian rules footballer with Fitzroy in the Victorian Football League (VFL).

He was recruited from the Eastern Suburbs club in the New South Wales competition.

Millington's career in Victoria was short-lived and by the start of the 1954 season he had returned to New South Wales and taken up rugby union with Randwick.

Millington died on 19 July 2025, at the age of 93.
