= Saul Cordero =

Puerto Rican broadcaster

- Born: Saul Humberto Cordero Ferrer; November 16, 1940; Aguadilla, Puerto Rico
- Died: July 1, 2025 (aged 84); New Jersey
- Education: Interamerican University of Puerto Rico (BEc)
- Occupation: Television journalist

Saul Cordero born in Aguadilla, Puerto Rico was a well known radio and television personality in Aguadilla and the western region of Puerto Rico.

== Biography ==
Saul Cordero was born on November 16, 1940, in Aguadilla, Puerto Rico to Jose Cordero and Elena Ferrer. He was married to Myrna Cerezo since 1966; they had one daughter and three sons. He earned a bachelor degree in economics from the Interamerican University of Puerto Rico.

Cordero worked in radio and TV for over 60 years, interviewing many important figures in the world of sports, politics, and culture. In 2019, the Puerto Rico legislature honored him for his 60 years in radio and TV and for his contributions to Puerto Rico. He worked as the anchorman of the West Coast daily news program for WOLE-TV. He also had a weekly program on WWNA (1340 AM) where he discussed topics of interest for the west coast residents.

Cordero died on July 2, 2025 at the age of 84 in New Jersey. He was buried at Paraiso del Cielo Municipal Cemetery in Aguadilla, Puerto Rico.
