= Viktor Gostishchev =

Russian scientist (1937–2025)

- Born: Viktor Kuzmich Gostishchev; 21 November 1937; Gostishchevo, Belgorod Oblast, Russian SFSR, USSR
- Died: 13 July 2025 (aged 87)
- Education: Kursk State Medical University
- Occupation: Scientist

Viktor Kuzmich Gostishchev (Russian: Виктор Кузьмич Гостищев; 21 November 1937 – 13 July 2025) was a Russian scientist. He was a recipient of the Order of the Red Banner of Labour (1991).

Gostishchev died on 13 July 2025, at the age of 87.
