= Volodymyr Lukan =

Ukrainian painter (1961–2025)

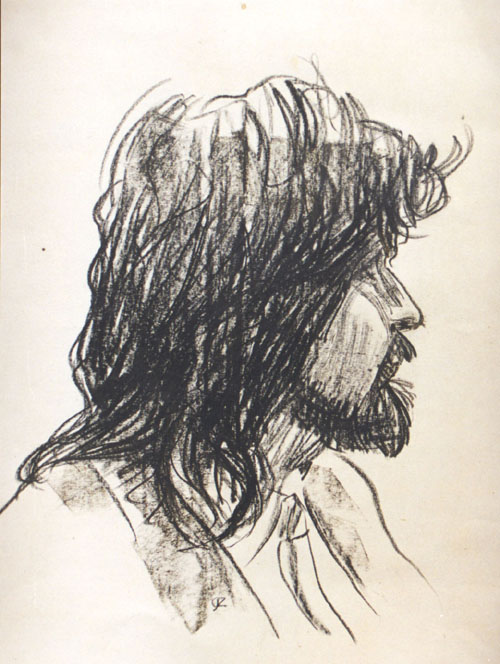
Self-portrait by Volodymyr Lukan

Volodymyr Hryhorovych Lukan (Ukrainian: Володимир Григорович Лукань; 26 March 1961 – 22 July 2025) was a Ukrainian artist.

== Life and career ==
Lukan was born on 26 March 1961 in Drohobych, Lviv Oblast. He graduated from the Lviv State Institute of Applied and Decorative Arts in 1984, before moving to Ivano-Frankivsk to teach at the Faculty of Art and Graphics of the Pedagogical Institute.

He was a Member of the National Union of Artists of Ukraine.

Lukan died on 22 July 2025, at the age of 64.
