= Robert Resnik =

American radio host (died 2025)

Robert Resnik (died July 21, 2025) was an American reference librarian, radio host, and author. He was the host of the program All the Traditions on VPR from 1996 until his death in 2025.

Resnik died on July 21, 2025.

== Awards and honors ==
In 2019, Resnik received the Herb Lockwood Prize in the Arts. In 2023, he was inducted into the Folk Alliance International's Folk DJ Hall of Fame.

== Albums ==
- Playing Favorites
- Old & New Vermont Songs

== Books ==
Legendary Locals of Burlington (2013)
