= Jean-Pierre Putters =

French journalist and film critic (1946–2025)

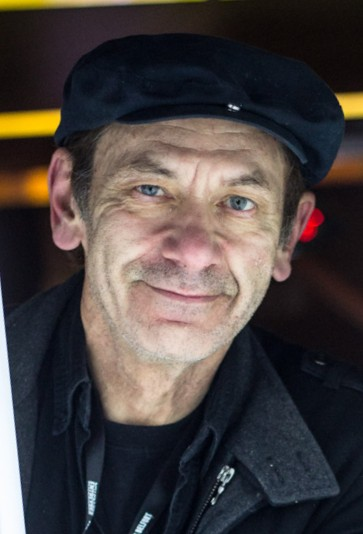
- Putters in 2013
- Born: 29 March 1946; Paris, France
- Died: 10 May 2025 (aged 79); Moissy-Cramayel, France
- Occupations: Journalist; film critic

Jean-Pierre Putters (29 March 1946 – 10 May 2025) was a French journalist and film critic.

Putters founded the magazine Mad Movies in 1972 and held small roles in films such as Ogroff and Time Demon.

Putters died on 10 May 2025, at the age of 79.

== Bibliography ==
- Ze craignos monsters tome 1 (1991)
- Ze craignos monsters tome 2 : le retour (1995)
- Ze craignos monsters tome 3 : le re-retour (1998)
- 101 monstres ringards (1999)
- Ça l'affiche mal ! : le meilleur du pire des affiches de cinéma du monde, Le Ghana (2011)
- « Mad Movies », la légende : « Mad », ma vie ! (2012)
- Ze craignos monsters tome 4 : le retour du fils de la vengeance (2014)
