= José Luis González (triathlete) =

Spanish triathlete (1988–2025)

Personal information
- Nationality: Spanish
- Born: 1988 Toledo, Spain
- Died: 21 July 2025 (aged 37) Spain

Sport
- Country: Spain
- Sport: Triathlon

José Luis González (Spanish: [xoˈse ˈlwiz ɣonˈθaleθ]; 1988 – 21 July 2025) was a Spanish triathlete.

== Biography ==
González was born 1988 in Toledo. He participated in the 2010 Puerto Vallarta PATCO Triathlon Pan-American Championships.

González was involved in a traffic accident whilst training on 16 July 2025. He died from his injuries on 21 July, at the age of 37.
