= Bob Hiensch =

Dutch diplomat (1948–2025)

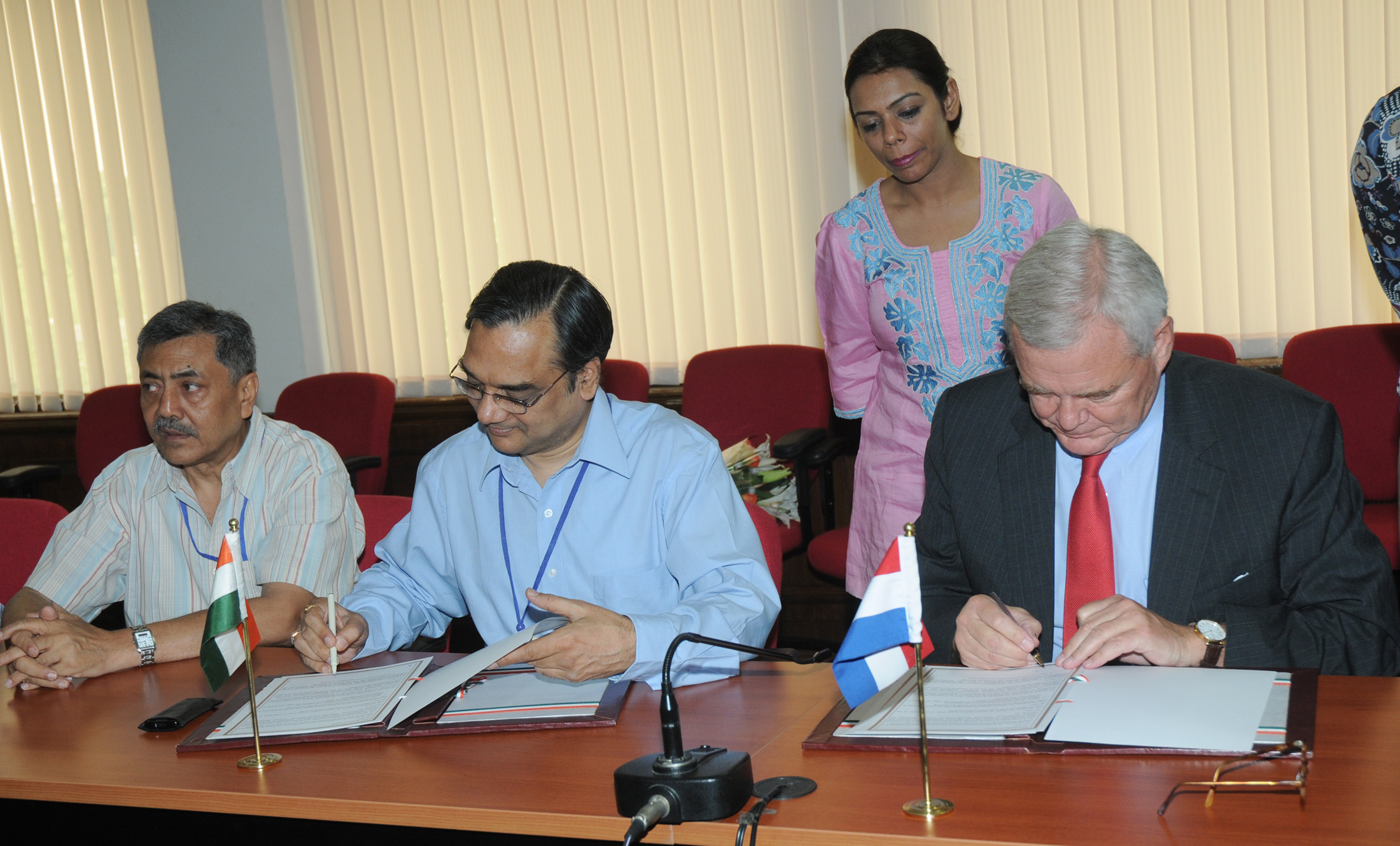
The Secretary, Ministry of Corporate Affairs, Shri D.K. Mittal and the Ambassador of the Netherlands, Mr. Bob Hiensch signing the Letter of Intent between Netherlands and Ministry of Corporate Affairs on Corporate Social Responsibility, in New Delhi

Bob Hiensch (17 May 1948 – 14 July 2025) was a Dutch diplomat who served as the ambassador-at-large at the Ministry of Foreign Affairs of the Netherlands.

== Life and career ==
Hiensch was born in Hilversum on 17 May 1948.

From 2003 to 2007, Hiensch was the Dutch ambassador to Israel. From 2007 until 2012, he was the ambassador to the Republic of India and non-resident Dutch ambassador to Bhutan and Nepal.

Hiensch died in Santa Cristina d'Aro, Spain on 14 July 2025, at the age of 77.
