= Jac Bekker =

South African politician (1942–2025)

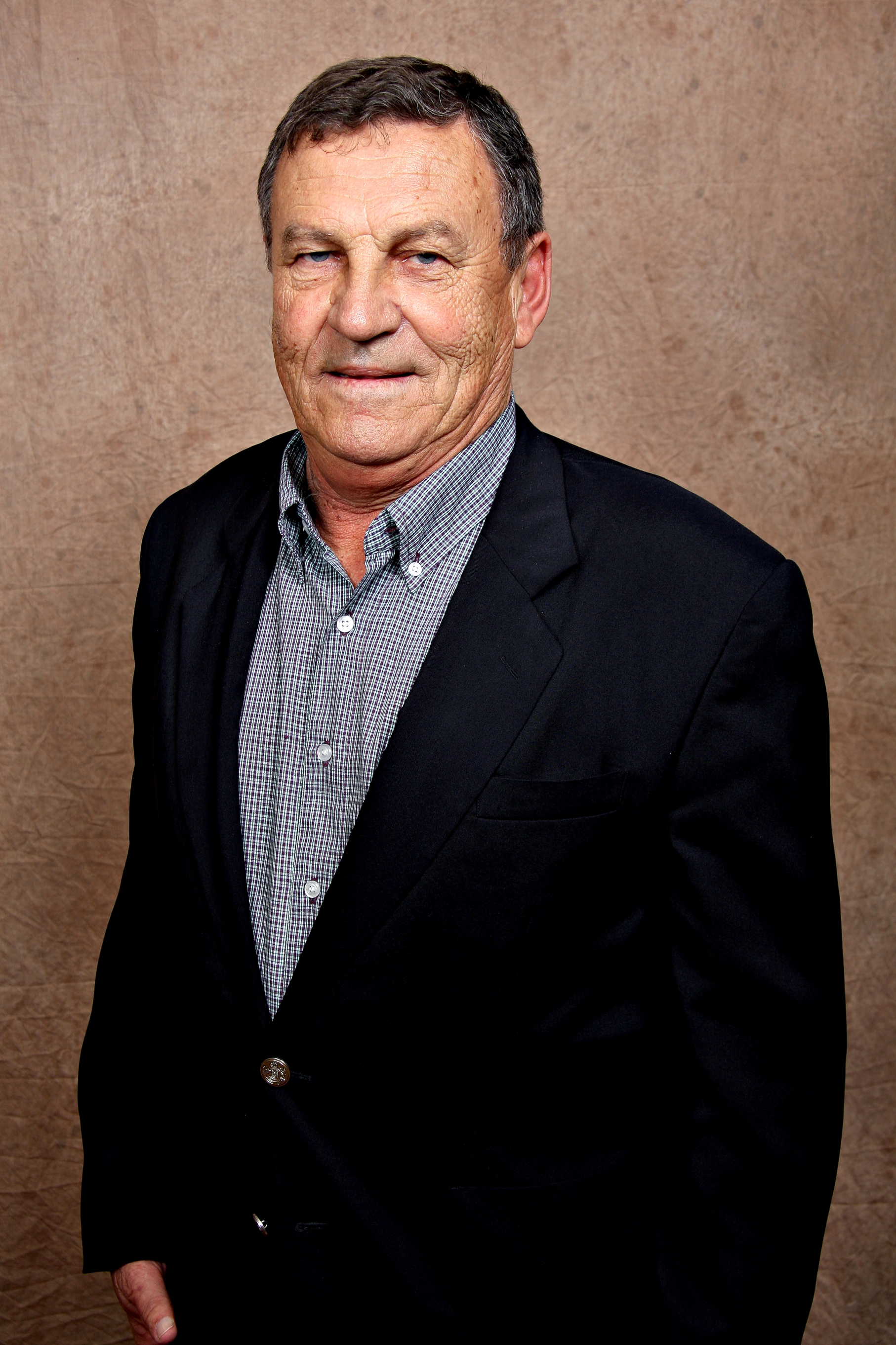
- Bekker in 2009

Permanent Delegate to the National Council of Provinces from the Western Cape
- In office 7 May 2009 – 6 May 2014

Personal details
- Born: 1 November 1942
- Died: 17 July 2025 (aged 82)
- Party: Democratic Alliance
- Spouse: Suna (died 2011)

Jacobus Marthinus Geyser Bekker (1 November 1942 – 17 July 2025) was a South African politician who served as a Permanent Delegate to the National Council of Provinces from the Western Cape from 2009 until 2014.

A member of the Democratic Alliance, he served as the chief whip of the party's caucus in the Eden District Municipality in the Western Cape. He was elected as a Permanent Delegate to the National Council of Provinces, the upper house of the South African parliament, following the 2009 general election. During his tenure in the NCOP, he was a member of the Select Committee on Security and Constitutional Development, the Select Committee on Co-operative Governance and Traditional Affairs, the Select Committee on Labour and Public Enterprises, the Select Committee on Public Services, the Joint Committee on Ethics and Members' Interests, the Ad Hoc Committee on General Intelligence Laws Amendment Bill, and the Joint Standing Committee on Defence. He was also the DA's constituency head in Oudtshoorn.

Bekker's wife, Suna, died following a long illness in 2011. The National Council of Provinces passed a motion of condolence to Bekker's family.

Bekker stood for election to the South African National Assembly as 156th on the DA's national list for the 2014 general election. He was not elected to the National Assembly and did not return to the NCOP.

Bekker died on 17 July 2025.
