= Yuri Lishaev =

Ukrainian mountaineer (1955–2025)

- Born: Yuri Mikhailovich Lishaev; 22 March 1955; Simferopol, Ukrainian SSR, USSR
- Died: 8 July 2025 (aged 70)
- Occupation: Mountaineer

Yuri Mikhailovich Lishaev (Russian: Юрий Михайлович Лишаев; 22 March 1955 – 8 July 2025) was a Soviet and Ukrainian mountaineer. He was a recipient of the Master of Sports of the USSR (1978).

Lishaev died on 8 July 2025, at the age of 70.
