= Lutz Mommartz =

German film director (1934–2025)

Lutz Mommartz (German: [ˈlʊts mɔˈmaːɐ̯ts]; 6 March 1934 – 26 July 2025) was a German film director.

== Life and career ==
Mommartz was born in Erkelenz on 6 March 1934. In 1937, he moved to Düsseldorf with his parents. From 1952 to 1975 he worked at local government administration of Düsseldorf as an inspector. From 1967, when he gave up painting, Mommartz began shooting 16 mm films. In the same year, he won a world-famous film prize with his film Selbstschüsse at the Knokke-Le-Zoute Experimental Film Festival in Belgium. On 1 October 1975 he founded a film class at the Kunstakademie Düsseldorf, Department of Kunsterzieher Münster. In 1977, he received the Federal Film Prize in silver for Beckett and 1978 the same for The Garden of Eden. In 1978 he received the professorship for film at the Künstakademie Münster. At the time of his death, he was working on securing and distributing his archive.

He lived and worked in Düsseldorf, and from 2001 to 2011 in Berlin.

Mommartz died on 26 July 2025, at the age of 91.

== Filmography ==
- 1965: Egon Wolke (Producer: Gustav Ehmck)
- 1967: Eisenbahn
- 1967: Selbstschüsse
- 1967: Die Treppe
- 1967: Markeneier
- 1967: Tanzschleife
- 1967: Oben / Unten
- 1967: Der Finger
- 1968: Gegenüber ZWEILEINWANDKINO
- 1968: Rechts/Links ZWEILEINWANDKINO
- 1968: 3Gläser
- 1968: Immatrikulation
- 1968: Weg zum Nachbarn
- 1969: Überfordert
- 1969: 400 m IFF
- 1969: Soziale Plastik (with Joseph Beuys)
- 1970: Mietersolidarität
- 1970: Wählt ADF
- 1970: Altersporno
- 1970: Spanienkrimi
- 1971: Inspektion
- 1971: Das aggressive braune Wasser in den Leitungen des Herrn Professors
- 1971: Farbstreifen
- 1972: Denkmäler (with Jürgen Kuhfuß)
- 1974: Die Angst am Rhein
- 1974: Haircut
- 1975: Farbstreifen
- 1975: Der gerechte Krieg 1525 (with Hartmut Kaminski and the Filmgruppe Düsseldorf)
- 1975: Als wär's von Beckett
- 1976: Die Schiller
- 1976: Flügelschlagen
- 1977: Der Garten Eden
- 1978: Mehr als Zwei
- 1979: Schattenkur
- 1980: Tango durch Deutschland
- 1982: Dreharbeit
- 1983: Jeder Mensch ist ein Tisch, nur, ich bin ein Stuhl
- 1983: Transit nach Berlin (with Mama Woju)
- 1985: Marmor bleibt immer kühl
- 1985: Anziehen
- 1986: Die italienische Jagd
- 1986: Die letzte Zigarette
- 1987: Focus
- 1987: Langsamer Walzer
- 1988: aurich
- 1988: Vier kleine Stücke
- 1989: Angst unter den Sternen
- 1990: Eddie

== Videos ==
- 1992: Fensterbild
- 1992: Die Tänzerin
- 1993: Schattenwand
- 1996: Bergbach bei Schrunz – Painting
- 1996: Fenster zum Hof
- 1997: Tausend Scherben – Die große Baustelle
- 1997: Digitale Kompression
- 1997: El periodo especial
- 1997: Buckow
- 1997: Der Mann, der Hitler verbrannte
- 1998: Jugendweihe 98
- 1998: Cafe Buckow
- 2003: Sonata Volumen (Ohne Titel)
- 2007: Margrets Film
- 2010: Schwarz/Weiss
- 2010: Barcelona 1999, Zehn Jahre danach (Alias: I am Rembrand)
- 2011: Kleine Stücke
- 2011: NICHTS
- 2013: Mafia XU
- 2017: DEPTHINESS – Hans Rombach buchstabiert
- Working on the project Instanz change of basic law

== Bibliography ==
- 1979: "Frei – wozu" ISBN 3-9800569-3-7 (free – for what)
  Speech addressed to the students on the occasion of their matriculation on 17 October 1979. Edition of the department art educators Münster of the Academy of Fine Arts Düsseldorf.
- 2000: "Das Authentische als Kunst" 3 Volumes, Hardcover, 13 x 18 cm with 3146 film stills (1846 in color). The Authentic as Art.
  Band 1–3 ISBN 3-89770-086-7
  Reviews and short own texts between the image sequences. A comprehensive look at his work from 1964 to 1999 consisting of early recordings of friends with the 8mm camera, his successes in the Artists' Film and Underground Cinema, his documentary work to study human limits – People in experimental situations and his work with students at the Art Academy Münster Germany. THE BOOK AS AN ART OBJECT can be ordered with the author himself or at the bookstore Walther König / Cologne / Germany.
- 2004: "text 2002/3" Hardcover, ISBN 3-86516-425-0
  The newspaper reading in the internet still was for free. I moved with 68 years to Berlin to witness the descent of the city after the reunification before it might eventually rise up again. While reading the SPIEGEL in the internet I came across one onlinepartnership agency, that started to establish them at that time in the internet. Quite unintentionally an exchange developed with multiple mail partners. I fell in love a few times. Two relations went beyond. And here with the background of a forty year old community with my partner in Düsseldorf a new love story evolved. The idea of finding material for a time map, led me to save the correspondence.
  text 2002/3 (ISBN 3-86516-425-0) is a book that consists of mail and SMS – in their original form without omissions or corrections. It was joined in "Justified" in four seamless columns to a language mesh. So it is to the reader to associate in the sea of words or to embark on the search for the intimate story. The mail data is underlined, the SMS data not.
  For the sake of authenticity the text is available in an easily readable form at archive.org. Involved with which the publication has not been discussed, remain anonymous.
- 2006: "text 2003/6" Hardcover, ISBN 3-936363-41-2
  The continuation of the book text 2002/3 also consists of mails and text messages in the original form without omissions or corrections. However, unlike in this language mesh text 2003/6 hides itself completely in a visual poem. Layout with 18 columns per double page . Courier New font 11.5 flush right, spread with 4.5 pt and compressed with 3 pt line spacing, so that the letters overlap each other in half. However, watching a screen the letters do overlap only the lower halves. The printing process makes it visible by cutting off the top half of the letters and with the other lower halves a new font is created.
  For the sake of authenticity the text is available in an easily readable form at archive.org. Involved with which the publication has not been discussed, remain anonymous.
- 2008: "Margret" Hardcover, ISBN 978-3-939777-10-6 Margret G., born in 1929 in Tecklenburg, was my partner since more than 45 years. With metastases in the abdomen, she fought the last years of her life and spent her last days in a hospice in Düsseldorf Germany. When I said goodbye to her to go to sleep in the evening of 15 August, I was surprised by her call later that evening. She had taken off her clothes and wanted me to come to take a picture of her: "A picture for the art". I was irritated when I drove to her and I went without my camera, because she always had refused to be photographed. It was then when I saw her in front of me, that I realized what was going on. The next day I fulfilled her desire – as if it was mine. With taking pictures of her we fulfilled miraculously both our lives.
  Margaret's letters from August 1957 to March 1961, her death on 16 /17 August 2006 (taken with a video camera) and extracts from her travel logs and her last notes.
