= Ruzaika Al-Tarish =

Emirati actress and media personality (1954–2025)

- رزقية الطرش سعد العتيبة
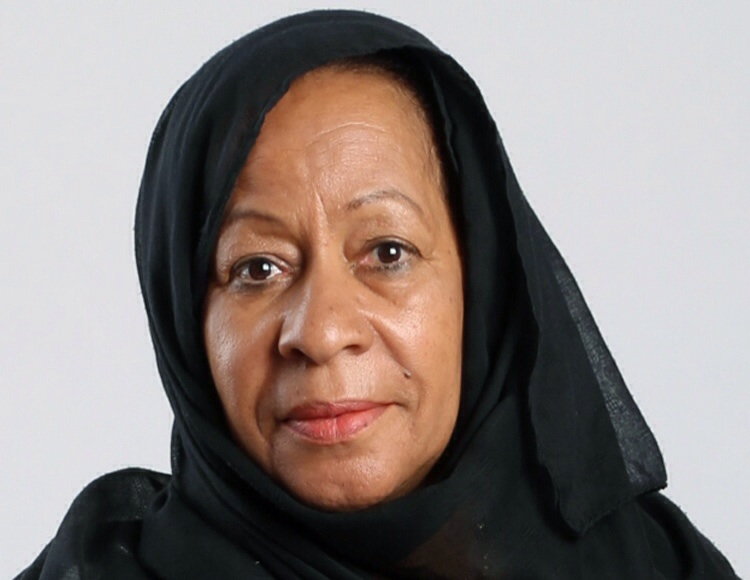
- Born: Razqiya Al Tarsh Saad Al Otaiba; 3 June 1954
- Died: 4 July 2025 (aged 71)
- Occupations: Actress, radio presenter, television personality

Raziqa Al Tarsh (3 June 1954 – 4 July 2025) was an Emirati actress and media personality.

== Life and career ==
Al-Tarsh was one of the first female media personalities in the United Arab Emirates. She began her career as a broadcaster by working for Abu Dhabi Radio in 1969, then moved to television in the 1970s, where she presented numerous television programs, before entering the acting field in the late 1970s, where she participated in several distinguished series, most notably "Luck, Nassib," "Hair Flying," "Tamasha," and "Saeed Al Haz." And "Al-Qiyada."

She began her career in the world of radio, which she loved, in 1964. She starred in the program "Women" through the short stories it included, in addition to participating in the program "True or True," which told the story of a couple discussing their daily issues and problems. In 1969, Razika joined the staff of Abu Dhabi Radio.

Al-Tarsh starred in five plays between 1969 and 1979, including "Allah Ya Dunya," "Patience Is Good," and "Tab Al Awal Tahwal." In 1977 and 1978, she moved into the world of acting in drama, appearing in three television productions: "Al Shaqiqan" and "Ashhafan" with Sultan Al Shaer and Mohammed Al Janahi, and "Al Ghus" with Khaled Al Nafisi, Ali Al Mufidi, and Maryam Al Saleh.

From 1980 onwards, Al-Tarsh appeared in 40 television series, ranging from drama to comedy, most of which aired during different Ramadan seasons. She played distinguished traditional and comedic roles, starring in Ramadan dramas, most notably "Hareem Bouhlel," "Manaqat Zawaj," "Sawalef," "Tamasha" in its various parts, "Ajeeb Ghareeb," "Saeed El Haz," "Habet Raml," "Bahr El Lail," "Shabih El Reeh," and "El Qayadah." During the 2020 Ramadan season, she participated in three series: "Miftah El Qafel," "Bint Soghan," and "Kena Ams."

In film, Al-Tarsh appeared in three films: "Eqab," "El Khetba," and "Zel." She also contributed to the world of writing. Her first work was "Naema and Naema," a comedy series starring actress Samira Ahmed and the artist Ahmed Al-Ansari, and she also wrote the scripts for some series such as “Azab Al-Dameer” and “Ateeja and Ateej.”

Al-Tarish died on 4 July 2025, at the age of 71.
