= Harald Groth =

German politician (1943–2025)

Member of the Landtag of Lower Saxony
- In office 21 June 1986 – 4 March 2003

Personal details
- Born: 14 April 1943; Uslar, Gau Southern Hanover-Brunswick, Germany
- Died: 6 July 2025 (aged 82); Bad Salzuflen, North Rhine-Westphalia, Germany
- Political party: SPD
- Education: University of Oldenburg; University of Bremen
- Occupation: Social worker

Harald Groth (German: [ˈhaʁalt ˈgʁoːt]; 14 April 1943 – 6 July 2025) was a German politician. A member of the Social Democratic Party, he served in the Landtag of Lower Saxony from 1986 to 2003.

Groth died in Bad Salzuflen on 6 July 2025, at the age of 82.
