= Jack Katz (audiologist) =

American audiologist

Jack Katz (March 25, 1934 - July 13, 2025) was an American audiologist and academic known for his work in central auditory processing. He developed the Staggered Spondaic Word (SSW) Test in the 1960s, a tool widely used in the assessment of central auditory processing disorder (CAPD). Having a Ph.D. in Audiology from the University of Pittsburgh, Katz authored several editions of the Handbook of Clinical Audiology, a standard reference in the field, and co-founded the International Guild of Auditory Processing Specialists (IGAPS).

Katz held academic appointments at institutions including Tulane University School of Medicine and the University at Buffalo, where he contributed to research and teaching in communicative disorders particularly to the development of the Buffalo Model for auditory processing. His work influenced diagnostic and therapeutic approaches to auditory processing for over five decades.

Katz also served as a consultant for NASA, the U.S. Penitentiary at Leavenworth, Roswell Park Memorial Institute, and Pearson Assessments.
