= Ossi Huber =

Austrian musician (1954–2025)

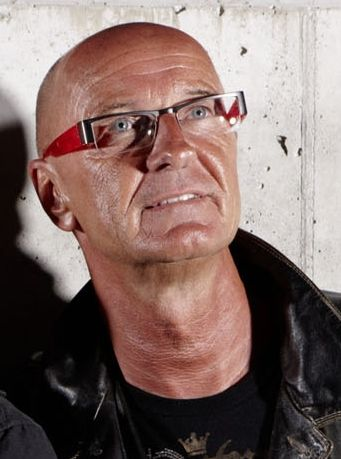
Huber in 2010

Oskar Huber (31 July 1954 – 6 July 2025) was an Austrian singer-songwriter, musician and author.

== Life and career ==
Huber attended the Bundeskonvikt in Lienz, where he also founded his first band Universe, which mainly played the popular classics of the 1960s. He left boarding school in 1971 after his mother died, and he took care of his widowed father.

In 1983, Huber founded the Bluesbreakers together with Reinhold Habernig. The band undertook numerous concert tours abroad, including two concerts in Beijing, Tianjin and Guilin. With the title Yellow Moon (1990), the Bluesbreakers achieved number 15 in the Austrian music charts, number 1 in the Austroparade of Ö3, and number 30 with the accompanying album Bad News, which was released in the same year.

In 1995, Huber founded the group Sterz, in which he played with Dieter Themel, Jörg Frießnegg and Claudio Ghidini, among others.

Outside of music, Huber published two cookbooks with accompanying CDs, Carinthia Kuchlklong and Carinthia Kuchlklong 2.

Huber died on 6 July 2025, at the age of 70.
