= Philippe Mellier =

French businessman (1955–2025)

- Born: 2 September 1955; Nancy, France
- Died: 8 July 2025 (aged 69); Bandol, France
- Education: ENSTA Paris, and INSEAD
- Occupation: Business executive
- Known for: CEO of Renault Trucks

Philippe Mellier (2 September 1955 – 8 July 2025) was a French business executive, known for his senior positions in the automotive industry.

== Early life ==
Born in Nancy on 2 September 1955, Mellier graduated from ENSTA Paris in 1979 and from INSEAD the following year.

== Career ==
In 1980, he began his career with the Ford Motor Company as a planning supervisor and sales analyst. For 19 years, he held various roles within the company in France, Portugal, New Zealand, and Mexico.

In 2000, he was named CEO of Renault Trucks and joined the board of directors of Volvo. On 1 May 2003, he was named as president of Alstom Transport and was named executive vice president of the wider company. In a 2009 interview with the Financial Times, he denounced the protectionism that was being established in the Chinese railroad market, calling on Western nations boycott of Chinese trains.

He then became CEO of De Beers in 2011 before joining FRAIKIN as president in 2018.

== Death ==
Mellier died in Bandol on 8 July 2025, at the age of 69.
