= Edward Roy Pike =

Australian physicist (1929–2025)

Edward Roy Pike FRS (4 December 1929 – 24 July 2025) was a British physicist and mathematician.

His early work was in the areas of thermodynamics, electrochemistry and many-body quantum theory. He later performed some of the first experiments in photon statistics, leading to a new field of statistical optical spectroscopy. Commercial exploitation has achieved worldwide sales of ‘Malvern’ photon-correlation equipment.

He was a Fellow of the Royal Society, Clerk Maxwell Professor of Theoretical Physics at King's College, London, U.K and a recipient of the MacRobert Award for engineering innovation among many other acknowledgements of his work.

== Life and career ==
Roy Pike was born in Perth, Australia on 4 December 1929, his parents having emigrated there a few years earlier. They returned to the U.K two years later, to Oxford, where he later attended Southfield Grammar School.

He joined the Royals Corps of Signals in 1948, to fulfil his National Service and served as General Montgomery’s Radio Engineer in SHAPE Headquarters in Fontainebleau, France.

He then went to University College Cardiff, in Wales, where he gained B.Sc degrees in both Mathematics and Physics. He remained at Cardiff to obtain his Ph.D. in X-ray diffraction.

On gaining his Ph.D. He took up a Fulbright Scholarship to become a lecturer at the Massachusetts Institute of Technology, Cambridge, Boston, U.S.A.

After his return to the U.K in 1960, he joined the Ministry of Defence (M.O.D) as a Scientific Officer in the theoretical physics group at the Royal Radar Establishment (later Royal Signals and Radar Establishment ) in Malvern, Worcestershire, U.K. It was at Malvern that Pike and his group developed the new field of statistical optical spectroscopy.

Statistical optical spectroscopy refers to the application of statistical and computational methods to interpret and analyse data from various optical spectroscopy techniques, including photon correlation spectroscopy, in which single particles of light from a laser are detected after being scattered from very small particles. This enables the measurement of the size of the particles, or the speed at which they are moving. His research ranged from measurements of wind tunnel supersonic velocities, molecular parameters of colloids, proteins and viruses and sound waves in liquid helium to super-resolving optical microscopy.

The photon correlation techniques developed have been commercialised and enables automated, non-destructive analysis for applications such as material identification, medical diagnostics, and food authentication.

In 1986 he retired from the M.O.D to take up the chair of Clerk Maxwell Professor of Theoretical Physics at King's College, London, U.K.

At King’s he tackled the more general cases of inverse problems (of which photon correlation is an application), working on speech acoustics and antenna theory.

He continued his work at King’s until his retirement in 2019. Pike died on 24 July 2025, at the age of 95.

== Publications ==
He was co-author with Sarben Sarkar of The Quantum Theory of Radiation (Clarendon Press, 1995).

He was editor or joint editor of the following:

- Photon Correlation and Light Beating Spectroscopy (joint editor, 1974)
- High Power Gas Lasers (editor, 1975)
- Photon Correlation Spectroscopy and Velocimetry (joint editor, 1977)
- Frontiers in Quantum Optics (joint editor, 1986)
- Chaos, Noise and Fractals (joint editor, 1987)
- Quantum Measurement and Chaos (joint editor, 1987)
- Squeezed and Non-classical Light (joint editor, 1988)
- Photons and Quantum Fluctuations (joint editor, 1988)
- Inverse Problems in Scattering and Imaging (joint editor, 1991)
- Photon Correlation and Light Scattering Spectroscopy (joint editor, 1997)
- Scattering (joint editor, 2002)
