= Sándor M. Kiss =

Hungarian historian (1943–2025)

Sándor M. Kiss (25 June 1943 – 8 July 2025) was a Hungarian historian.

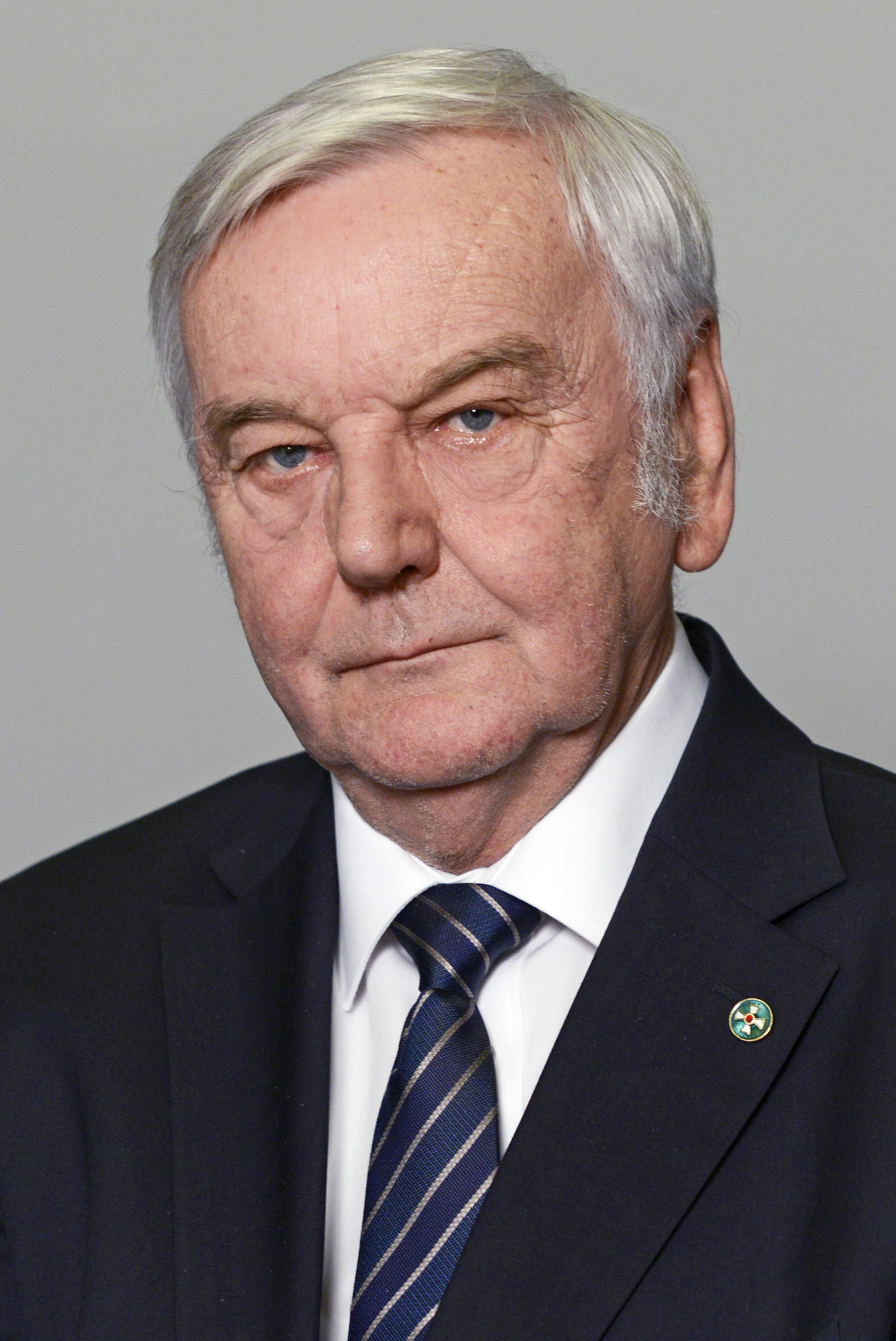
Sándor M. Kiss

== Life and career ==
Kiss was born in Budapest on 25 June 1943. He graduated from the Faculty of Humanities of Eötvös Loránd University in 1967 as a teacher of Hungarian and history.

In 1990-91 he was the head of the department of the Cabinet Office of the Ministry of Culture, and between 1991 and 1994 he was the chief government adviser of the Prime Minister's Advisory Board. He was a member of the Historical Fact-Finding Committee researching the history of the volleys during the 1956 Revolution and War of Independence. From 1997 to 2013, he was the head of the Institute of History of the Faculty of Humanities of the Pázmány Péter Catholic University, and taught at the university as a professor emeritus. Since 1, July 2013, he has been the Deputy Director General of the Institute and Archive for the History of the Regime Change.

In 2000, he was awarded the Officer's Cross of the Order of Merit of the Republic of Hungary.

Kiss died on 8 July 2025, at the age of 82.
