= Trevor Lloyd (footballer) =

Australian rules footballer (1952–2025)

Personal information
- Full name: Trevor Lloyd
- Born: 14 February 1952
- Died: 3 July 2025 (aged 73)
- Original team: Olympic Youth Club
- Height: 189 cm (6 ft 2 in)
- Weight: 89 kg (196 lb)
- Position: Half back / Back pocket

Playing career
Years	Club	Games (Goals)
1971–75	Fitzroy	61 (19)

Trevor Lloyd (14 February 1952 – 3 July 2025) was an Australian rules footballer who played with Fitzroy in the Victorian Football League (VFL). He died on 3 July 2025, at the age of 73.
