= 2025 in Russia =

- Decades: 2000s; 2010s; 2020s
- See also: History of Russia; Timeline of Russian history; List of years in Russia

Events in the year 2025 in Russia.

== Incumbents ==
- President: Vladimir Putin
- Prime Minister: Mikhail Mishustin

=== Governors ===
- Amur Oblast: Vasily Orlov (ER)
- Arkhangelsk Oblast: Alexander Tsybulsky (ER)
- Astrakhan Oblast: Igor Babushkin (ER)
- Belgorod Oblast: Vyacheslav Gladkov (ER)
- Bryansk Oblast: Alexander Bogomaz (ER)
- Chelyabinsk Oblast: Alexey Teksler (ER)
- Irkutsk Oblast: Igor Kobzev (ER)
- Ivanovo Oblast: Stanislav Voskresensky (ER)
- Kaliningrad Oblast: Alexey Besprozvannykh (ER)
- Kaluga Oblast: Vladislav Shapsha (ER)
- Kemerovo Oblast: Ilya Seredyuk (ER)
- Kirov Oblast: Alexander Sokolov (ER)
- Kostroma Oblast: Sergey Sitnikov (ER)
- Kurgan Oblast: Vadim Shumkov (ER)
- Kursk Oblast: Alexey Smirnov (ER)
- Leningrad Oblast: Alexander Drozdenko (ER)
- Lipetsk Oblast: Igor Artamonov (ER)
- Magadan Oblast: Sergey Nosov (ER)
- Moscow Oblast: Andrey Vorobyov (ER)
- Murmansk Oblast: Andrey Chibis (ER)
- Nizhny Novgorod Oblast: Gleb Nikitin (ER)
- Novgorod Oblast: Andrey Nikitin (ER)
- Novosibirsk Oblast: Andrey Travnikov (ER)
- Omsk Oblast: Vitaliy Khotsenko (ER)
- Orenburg Oblast: Denis Pasler (ER)
- Oryol Oblast: Andrey Klychkov (CPRF)
- Penza Oblast: Oleg Melnichenko (ER)
- Pskov Oblast: Mikhail Vedernikov (ER)
- Rostov Oblast: Yury Slyusar (ER)
- Ryazan Oblast: Pavel Malkov (ER)
- Sakhalin Oblast: Valery Limarenko (ER)
- Samara Oblast: Vyacheslav Fedorishchev (ER)
- Saratov Oblast: Roman Busargin (ER)
- Smolensk Oblast: Vasily Anokhin (ER)
- Tambov Oblast: Yevgeny Perfilov (LDPR)
- Tomsk Oblast: Vladimir Mazur (ER)
- Tula Oblast: Dmitry Milyaev (ER)
- Tver Oblast: Igor Rudenya (ER)
- Tyumen Oblast: Aleksandr Moor (ER)
- Ulyanovsk Oblast: Alexey Russkikh (CPRF)
- Vladimir Oblast: Alexander Avdeyev (ER)
- Volgograd Oblast: Andrey Bocharov (ER)
- Vologda Oblast: Georgy Filimonov (ER)
- Voronezh Oblast: Alexander Gusev (ER)
- Yaroslavl Oblast: Mikhail Yevrayev (ER)
- Jewish Autonomous Oblast: Maria Kostyuk (ER)

== Ongoing ==
- Russo-Ukrainian War
  - Russian invasion of Ukraine (2022–present)
  - Timeline of the Russian invasion of Ukraine (1 January 2025 – present)

== Events ==
=== January ===
- 1 January – A Mil Mi-28 helicopter crashes in Voronezh Oblast.
- 11 January – Ukraine announces the capture of two North Korean soldiers during fighting in Russia's Kursk Oblast.
- 17 January – Iran and Russia sign a "comprehensive strategic partnership treaty".
- 23 January – The Russian spy vessel Kidin is reported to have caught fire off the coast of Syria.
- 29 January – An illegal logger opens fire at forest rangers trying to arrest him in Usokhi, Kaluga Oblast, killing three rangers and holding two others hostage before committing suicide.

=== February ===
- 6 February – Yury Borisov is dismissed as director-general of Roscosmos by President Putin and is replaced by Gonets head Dmitry Bakanov.
- 8 February –
  - An underwater cable in the Baltic Sea owned by Rostelecom is damaged following an "external impact".
  - At least eight people are injured in a fire at the former Elektrozavod building in Moscow.
- 9 February – A state of emergency is declared in Sakhalin Oblast after the Chinese cargo vessel An Ying 2 runs aground off the coast of Nevelsky District.
- 11 February –
  - The European Court of Human Rights rules that the Russian government had engaged in "a coordinated effort to suppress dissent" over its invasion of Ukraine.
  - Marc Fogel, an American teacher detained in Russia for drugs charges since 2021, is released and repatriated to the United States as part of a prisoner exchange.
- 12 February – US President Donald Trump announces the beginning of negotiations with Russia to end the war in Ukraine following a phone call with President Putin.
- 13 February –
  - The FSB says that it had killed several members of a terrorist group plotting an attack on the Pskov train station following a shootout.
  - Two miners are killed in a collapse at a potash mine operated by Uralkali in Solikamsk, Perm Krai.
  - Cryptocurrency exchange operator Alexander Vinnik, who had been imprisoned in the United States for a cybercrime conviction, is released and repatriated to Russia as part of a prisoner exchange.
- 17 February – Konstantin Rachalovsky, the deputy governor of Rostov Oblast, is arrested on suspicion of abuse of power over the provision of state subsidies amounting to 155.2 million rubles ($1.7 million) to financially distressed companies that eventually went bankrupt.
- 18 February – Russia and the United States began official discussions in Saudi Arabia on ending the war in Ukraine.
- 26 February – Denis Alexeyev, the deputy governor of Vologda Oblast, is arrested along with Kirill Bocharov, head of the Vologda Oblast representative office in Moscow, on suspicion of receiving part of a 100 million ruble ($1.1 million) bribe.
- 27 February – A man is arrested for throwing a grenade at the entrance to the regional administration office of Samara Oblast in Samara.
- 28 February – The FSB arrests two church officials on suspicion of plotting to kill Russian Orthodox bishop Tikhon Shevkunov, who is close to Putin.

=== March ===
- 3 March – The FSB says it shot and killed a man who planned "terrorist attacks" on the Moscow metro and a Jewish religious institution in Moscow.
- 4 March – Nikolai Onishchenko, the head of Zavyalovsky District, Altai Krai, is shot dead while leaving a cafe in Zavyalovo.
- 5 March – Four suspected Islamic State militants are killed in an "anti-terrorist operation" in Makhachkala, Dagestan.
- 10 March – Two British diplomats are expelled from Russia for alleged spying.
- 11 March – Two students are injured in a knife attack at a school in Nizhny Novgorod. The suspect, who is also a student, is arrested.
- 13 March – The Russian defence ministry says its forces had retaken Sudzha, Kursk Oblast from Ukraine.
- 18 March –
  - The Ukrainian military launches a major incursion into Belgorod Oblast.
  - Yury Bezdudny resigns as Governor of Nenets Autonomous Okrug.
  - A Mil Mi-28 helicopter of the Russian military crashes in Leningrad Oblast, killing its entire crew.
- 31 March – Konstantin Rudnev, the founder of the Ashram Shambala sect, is arrested along with 13 of his followers in Argentina on human trafficking charges.

=== April ===
- 1 April – President Putin orders a ban on government, telecommunications and banking sector employees from using foreign messaging applications.
- 2 April – A Tu-22M3 bomber crashes in Usolsky District, Irkutsk Oblast, killing one of its four crew.
- 3 April – The State Duma expels Yury Napso as a deputy of the Liberal Democratic Party of Russia for failing to attend its sessions without valid reason since 2023.
- 4 April – Three Moldovan diplomats are expelled from Russia in retaliation for Moldova expelling three Russian diplomats it accused of involvement in facilitating the escape of fugitive MP Alexandr Nesterovschi.
- 8 April – Dual US-Russian national Ksenia Karelina, who had been imprisoned in Russia for donating to a charity providing humanitarian aid for Ukraine, is released and repatriated to the United States following a prisoner exchange in the United Arab Emirates that sees the release of Arthur Petrov, a dual German-Russian citizen arrested on suspicion of supplying manufacturers linked to the Russian military with microelectronics.
- 9 April – The Romanian defense attaché and his deputy are expelled from Russia in retaliation for Romania expelling their Russian counterparts in March.
- 17 April –
  - The Supreme Court of Russia removes the Taliban from Russia's list of designated terrorist organizations.
  - Vadim Shamarin, the former deputy chief of the Russian General Staff, is convicted and sentenced to seven years' imprisonment by a court martial for accepting 36 million rubles ($437,600) in bribes from a phone manufacturing plant in exchange for state contracts and “general patronage.”
- 22 April – Four people, including three soldiers, are injured in an explosion at the arsenal of the 51st Main Missile and Artillery Directorate in Kirzhachsky District, Vladimir Oblast.
- 23 April – A state of emergency is declared in Zabaykalsky Krai due to wildfires.
- 25 April – Major General Yaroslav Moskalik, deputy head of the Main Operational Directorate of the General Staff of the Russian Armed Forces, is killed in a car bombing in Balashikha, Moscow Oblast.
- 26 April – Russian forces announce the clearing of Kursk Oblast from Ukrainian forces.

=== May ===
- 4 May –
  - Four people are killed in an explosion inside an apartment in Yasenevo District, Moscow.
  - Azerbaijani MP Azer Badamov is detained in Astrakhan amid reports that he had been barred entry by Russia over allegations of Russophobia.
- 5 May – Three police officers and two gunmen are killed in a shootout in Makhachkala, Dagestan.
- 7 May – Russia signs a strategic partnership treaty with Venezuela.
- 8 May – Alrosa announces the discovery of the largest diamond mined in Russia, a 468-carat piece named "80 Years of Victory in the Great Patriotic War" that was dug from the Mir mine in the Sakha Republic.
- 12 May – The International Civil Aviation Organization finds Russia responsible for the downing of Malaysia Airlines Flight 17 over eastern Ukraine in 2014.
- 13 May – A state of emergency is declared in Buryatia due to wildfires.
- 14 May – A court in Moscow convicts Grigory Melkonyants, the co-chair of the election monitor Golos, on charges of working for an "undesirable" organisation and sentences him to five years' imprisonment.
- 16 May –
  - Ukraine and Russia hold their first direct peace negotiations since 2022 in Turkey.
  - A blackout hits Kemerovo Oblast, cutting electricity to 28,000 people.
- 19 May –
  - The FSB announces the arrest of nine people in Stavropol Krai on suspicion of plotting attacks on police officers during Victory Day.
  - The government designates Amnesty International as an "undesirable organization".
- 23 May – An Mi-8 helicopter of the Russian military crashes during a training flight in Uritsky District, Oryol Oblast, killing its entire crew.
- 26 May – A European Union diplomat is injured in an assault by suspected Russian security agents in Vladivostok.
- 28 May – Five people are killed in a knife attack at a house in Baikalsk, Irkutsk Oblast. The assailant also dies after setting the house on fire.
- 31 May –
  - A road bridge collapses into railway tracks in Bryansk Oblast and derails a train underneath, killing seven people and injuring 47 others.
  - A second road bridge collapses into railway tracks in Zheleznogorsky District, Kursk Oblast and derails a train underneath.

=== June ===
- 1 June – Ukraine launches Operation Spider's Web, a series of drone attacks on Russian air bases as far as Irkutsk Oblast.
- 8 June – A ship towing two barges runs aground and breaks apart along the Yenisei River in Kazachinsky District, Krasnoyarsk Krai, spilling around 79.3 metric tons of diesel fuel and causing an oil spill reaching up to 50 kilometers along the shoreline that results in 1.2 billion rubles ($15.3 million) in environmental damage.
- 9 June – The mayor of Krasnoyarsk, Vladislav Loginov, is arrested on suspicion of accepting more than 180 million rubles ($2.3 million) in bribes. He resigns on 15 September.
- 17 June – The Supreme Court of Russia orders the dissolution of the Civic Initiative party for failing to participate in elections since 2018, during which its candidates were blocked from registering by election officials.
- 25 June – The FSB arrests two Moldovan nationals on suspicion of spying for Moldova.
- 27 June –
  - A state of emergency is declared in Izhevsk following a fuel leak of undetermined origin that began on 29 May and contaminated the Starkovka River.
  - Two Azerbaijani nationals die following a raid by Russian authorities in Yekaterinburg, triggering a diplomatic dispute between Moscow and Azerbaijan.
- 30 June – Religious leader Vissarion is sentenced to 12 years' imprisonment by a court in Novosibirsk for harming the mental and physical health of his followers in the Church of the Last Testament.

=== July ===
- 1 July –
  - Former deputy defense minister Timur Ivanov is convicted and sentenced to 13 years' imprisonment by the Moscow City Court for embezzling 3.9 billion rubles ($50 million) in public funds.
  - An Su-34 fighter-bomber of the Russian Aerospace Forces crashes during a training flight in Nizhny Novgorod Oblast following a suspected mechanical failure. The two crew members safely eject.
- 3 July –
  - Major General Mikhail Gudkov, the deputy commander of the Russian Navy, is killed along with 10 people in a suspected Ukrainian missile attack in Kursk Oblast.
  - Russia becomes the first country to recognize the Taliban as the legitimate government of Afghanistan since they retook power in 2021.
- 6 July – a Communist Party of the Russian Federation congress adopted a resolution calling the 1956 report "On the Cult of Personality and Its Consequences" made by Nikita Khrushchev erroneous.
- 7 July –
  - Roman Starovoit is dismissed as minister of transportation and is found dead in a suspected suicide hours later.
  - Former deputy Rosgvardiya director Viktor Strigunov is arrested on suspicion of bribery involving the construction of a training facility in Kemerovo Oblast.
- 8 July – A Sokol Altius military drone crashes into a dacha during a training flight in Tatarstan. No injuries are reported.
- 9 July – The European Court of Human Rights finds Russia responsible for the downing of Malaysia Airlines Flight 17 over eastern Ukraine in 2014.
- 11 July – Russia orders the closure of the Polish consulate in Kaliningrad in response to Poland's decision to close the Russian consulate in Kraków in May.
- 14 July –
  - A Mil Mi-8 helicopter crashes northeast of Okhotsk, Khabarovsk Krai, killing all five people on board.
  - Three people are killed in a lightning strike at a resort in Tula Oblast.
- 16 July – The Federal Customs Service and the FSB seize 820 kilograms of cocaine valued at 12 billion rubles ($153 million) hidden under a shipment of bananas from South America.
- 20 July –
  - A magnitude 7.4 earthquake hits off the coast of Kamchatka, triggering a 1.53 m (5 ft 0 in) tsunami.
  - A Moscow court fines bookstore Falalster and its founder for selling books deemed LGBTQA+ “propaganda.”
- 21 July – A bus carrying mine workers falls into a ravine in Sakha Republic, killing 13 people and injuring 20 others.
- 22 July –
  - Gleb Trifonov, the editor-in-chief of the Telegram-based media outlet Baza, is arrested in Moscow on bribery charges.
  - A state of emergency is declared in Tuva due to wildfires.
- 23 July –
  - The Supreme Court of Russia designates the "International Satanist Movement" as an extremist organization.
  - President Putin signs a law allowing Belarusian citizens living as permanent residents in Russia to vote in local elections and run for local office.
- 24 July –
  - Angara Airlines Flight 2311, a Antonov An-24 operated by Angara Airlines, crashes near Tynda, Amur Oblast, killing all 48 people on board.
  - Maksim Yegorov, the former governor of Tambov Oblast, is arrested on bribery charges.
- 25 July –
  - Six people, including a child, are killed in a gas explosion at an apartment building in Saratov.
  - A state of emergency is declared in parts of Voronezh Oblast due to agricultural damage caused by a storm.
- 26 July – A fire at an electrical substation causes a major power outage in Makhachkala.
- 27 July – The Russian airliner Nordwind launches flights to Pyongyang, marking the first commercial flights between Russia and North Korea.
- 28 July – A cyberattack is carried out on the flag carrier Aeroflot and its subsidiaries Rossiya Airlines and Pobeda, causing disruptions to hundreds of flights.
- 30 July –
  - 2025 Kamchatka Peninsula earthquake: A M_{w} 8.8 earthquake hits off the coast of Kamchatka Krai, triggering a tsunami that hits parts of the Kuril Islands and other damages in Sakhalin Oblast.
  - The Klyuchevskaya Sopka volcano erupts in Kamchatka Krai.
  - Federal agency Rospotrebnadzor blocks web service Speedtest after identifying alleged threats to the security of the public communications network and a segment of the Internet in the country.
  - The Justice Ministry designates Alexey Navalny's memoir, Patriot, as extremist material.
- 31 July – President Putin signs laws criminalizing online access and searches for online deemed as extremist, and banning the advertising of VPN services.

=== August ===
- 1 August –
  - President Putin signs a law allowing police to preemptively freeze bank accounts without a court order.
  - A state of emergency is declared in parts of Kabardino-Balkaria due to mudslides caused by heavy rains near Mount Elbrus.
  - US President Donald Trump orders the repositioning of two nuclear submarines to "appropriate regions" in response to highly-charged comments made by former Russian president and deputy National Security Council chair Dmitry Medvedev.
- 2 August – Authorities designate Sakhalin Oblast as the first Russian region to achieve carbon neutrality.
- 3 August – The Krasheninnikov volcano in Kamchatka erupts for the first time since the 15th century.
- 4 August –
  - A cargo train hits a tourist bus at a level-crossing in Lodeynopolsky District, Leningrad Oblast, killing one person.
  - Authorities announce the deaths of three people suspected of plotting attacks against police officers in a shootout near Islamei, Kabardino-Balkaria.
  - Russia ends a voluntary ban on its deployment of intermediate-range missiles, citing threats from the United States and other Western countries.
- 5 August – The government designates the Zimin Foundation as an "undesirable organization".
- 6 August –
  - Four people, including a soldier, are killed in a grenade explosion in Kurkino, Tula Oblast.
  - President Putin signs a decree allowing Russia to increase its greenhouse gas emissions by 20% by 2035 compared with 2021 levels.
- 11 August – Major General Denis Putilov, the former head of the armored vehicle service of the Central Military District, is sentenced by a court-martial to eight years' imprisonment for accepting a 10-million-ruble ($126,000) bribe over a state defense contract.
- 14 August –
  - The government designates Reporters Without Borders as an "undesirable organization".
  - Three workers are killed in a fall at a power plant in Vladivostok.
  - A judge is found murdered in Kamyshin, Volgograd Oblast.
- 15 August –
  - Twenty-eight workers are killed in an explosion at a gunpowder factory in Lesnoy, Ryazan Oblast.
  - President Putin holds a summit meeting with US President Donald Trump in Alaska.
- 24 August – One person is killed in a gas explosion at the Central Children's Store on Lubyanka in Moscow.
- 25 August – Vladimir Bazarov, the deputy governor of Kursk Oblast, is arrested on suspicion of embezzling funds meant for border fortifications when he was deputy governor of Belgorod Oblast.
- 27 August – Dmitry Naumov, the mayor of Vladimir, is arrested amid accusations of fraud and involvement in organized crime.
- 29 August –
  - The first imported case of chikungunya in Russia is detected in a patient in Moscow who had traveled to Sri Lanka.
  - Around 30 cubic meters of oil leak out during loading at the Port of Novorossiysk, causing an oil spill that affects around 350 square kilometers of the Black Sea.
  - Authorities seize 1.5 metric tons of cocaine valued at more than 20 billion rubles ($240 million) from a ship carrying bananas from Ecuador that docked in Saint Petersburg.

=== September ===
- 2 September –
  - A court-martial sentences General Alexander Ogloblin, the former head of communications of the Ministry of Defence, to nine years' imprisonment for taking bribes.
  - Two people are killed in a landmine explosion in Popovka, Kursk Oblast.
  - Uzbekistan sends a diplomatic note to Russia in protest over a video of an Uzbek taxi driver being subjected to verbal abuse in Khimki.
- 3 September – President Vladimir Putin meets with General Secretary of the Chinese Communist Party Xi Jinping and General Secretary of the Workers' Party of Korea Kim Jong Un in Beijing as part of the 2025 China Victory Day Parade.
- 4 September – The Russian government expels an Estonian diplomat in retaliation for the expulsion of a Russian diplomat from Estonia in August.
- 8 September – The FSB arrests an Azerbaijani citizen accused of joining an unidentified Ukrainian terrorist organization and conducting surveillance of potential targets in Stavropol and Yessentuki.
- 13 September – A magnitude 7.4 earthquake hits off the coast of Kamchatka.
- 14 September –
  - 2025 Russian elections.
  - A locomotive derails in Gatchinsky District, Leningrad Oblast, killing the driver.
- 15 September – An all-terrain vehicle falls into Lake Amudisa in Zabaykalsky Krai, killing five people.
- 19 September –
  - A magnitude 7.8 earthquake hits off the coast of Kamchatka Krai, damaging several buildings in Petropavlovsk-Kamchatsky and generating a tsunami measuring 60 cm (2.0 ft).
  - The International Olympic Committee allows athletes from Russia to compete as neutrals in the 2026 Winter Olympics in Italy under strict conditions.
- 20 September – Intervision 2025
- 26 September – A freight train carrying gasoline derails and catches fire after colliding with a truck at a crossing in Smolensk Oblast, killing one person and injuring two others.
- 27 September –
  - The International Paralympic Committee lifts the partial suspension of Russia and Belarus from competition that had been imposed following the start of Russo-Ukrainian war in 2022.
  - An agricultural emergency is declared in Rostov Oblast due to damage caused by spring frosts and summer drought.
- 29 September –
  - Two people are injured in a stabbing at the Arkhangelsk College of Construction and Economics in Arkhangelsk.
  - Oleg Chemezov, the former governor of Sverdlovsk Oblast, is arrested amid an investigation into corruption involving utility companies in the oblast.

=== October ===
- 3 October –
  - At least 41 people are reported to have died after consuming bootleg alcohol in Leningrad Oblast.
  - An Antonov An-2 aircraft operated by Borus Airlines crashes near Tanzybei in Krasnoyarsk Krai, killing its two pilots.
- 9 October –
  - President Putin admits that Russian air defenses were responsible for the shooting down of Azerbaijan Airlines Flight 8243 over Chechnya in 2024.
  - A MiG-31 crashes in Lipetsk Oblast, the two pilots on board eject safely.
- 10 October – The first direct passenger flight from Riyadh to Moscow, operated by Saudi Arabian flag carrier Saudia, lands at Sheremetyevo Airport.
- 14 October – The European Court of Human Rights orders Russia to pay Georgia more than 250 million euros ($289,000,000) for violations committed following the Russo-Georgian War in 2008.
- 17 October – Three people are killed in an explosion at an explosives factory in Sterlitamak, Bashkortostan.
- 18 October – An outbreak of food poisoning connected to ready-made food products sold in grocery stores breaks out in Buryatia, resulting in at least 121 people being hospitalized.
- 20 October – A passenger aircraft operated by Azerbaijan Airlines skids off the runway of Pulkovo Airport in Saint Petersburg while performing an emergency landing due to a landing gear malfunction, resulting in the evacuation of all 155 passengers.
- 22 October – The US imposes sanctions on Rosneft and Lukoil.
- 23 October – An explosion at a munitions plant in Kopeysk, Chelyabinsk Oblast, kills 23 people and injures 19 others.
- 28 October – A massive power outage caused by a broken lightning-protection cable falling onto a high-voltage transmission line hits central and southern Sakhalin Oblast.
- 31 October – A tram derails and collides with two minibuses on a bridge in Tula, killing four people.

=== November ===
- 4 November – President Putin signs a law moving the Russian military toward a year-round conscription model beginning in 2026.
- 5 November – President Putin appoints Vitaly Korolyov as acting governor of Tver Oblast.
- 7 November – A Kamov Ka-226 helicopter operated by the Kizlyar Electromechanical Plant crashes into an empty house in Dagestan, killing four people and injuring three.
- 11 November – Ulyanovsk Oblast becomes the first federal subject of Russia to impose a permanent internet blackout, restricting mobile internet access to parts of the region for the duration of the Russo-Ukrainian war.
- 13 November – An Su-30 crashes in the Republic of Karelia, killing the two occupants on board.
- 20 November – The Supreme Court orders the dissolution of the Party of Growth following a request from the party itself, citing failure to meet legal requirements for regional representation.
- 22 November – Two suspected saboteurs are killed in a shootout with the FSB along a railway line in Altai Krai.
- 27 November –
  - Russia orders the closure of the Polish consulate in Irkutsk in retaliation for the Polish government's decision to close the Russian consulate in Gdańsk on 19 November over Polish accusations of Russian involvement in sabotaging its railway systems.
  - The Southern District Military Court in Rostov-on-Don sentences eight people to life imprisonment on charges of carrying out the 2022 Crimean Bridge explosion.
  - The Supreme Court designates the Anti-Corruption Foundation as a terrorist organization.
  - The International Judo Federation allows Russian athletes to compete under the Russian flag, ending a ban imposed since the start of the Russo-Ukrainian war in 2022.
- 28 November – The government designates Human Rights Watch as an "undesirable organization".

=== December ===
- 1 December –
  - President Putin signs an executive order suspending visa requirements for Chinese nationals until 14 September 2026.
  - Saudi Arabia and Russia sign an agreement on mutual visa exemption for each other's citizens.
- 2 December –
  - The Court of Arbitration for Sport overturns a ban imposed by the International Ski and Snowboard Federation on Russian athletes competing as neutrals since the beginning of the Russo-Ukrainian war.
  - The State Duma expels Anatoly Voronovsky as an MP for United Russia amid an investigation against him for bribery.
- 3 December –
  - The Babushkinsky District Court in Moscow convicts imprisoned former Khabarovsk Krai governor Sergey Furgal on charges of involvement in organized crime and sentences him to an additional 23 years in prison.
  - At least 484 Caspian seals are found dead in a mass die-off along the Caspian Sea coast of Dagestan.
  - The government blocks access to Roblox, accusing it of containing "inappropriate content" for children.
- 4 December –
  - A public inquiry in the United Kingdom finds president Putin "morally responsible" for the death of Dawn Sturgess from Novichok poisoning in the aftermath of the attempted assassination of former double agent Sergei Skripal in 2018. The UK government subsequently imposes sanctions on the GRU over the attack.
  - A two-week mask mandate is imposed in Blagoveshchensk due an increase in cases of respiratory diseases.
  - The government announces that it had blocked access to FaceTime and Snapchat, accusing the applications of being used for terrorist and criminal purposes.
- 8 December – The Supreme Court designates the Poland-based Congress of People's Deputies led by exiled former MP Ilya Ponomarev as a terrorist organization.
- 9 December –
  - The Supreme Court voids a 2013 decree that allowed courts in Russia to apply the European Convention on Human Rights and adhere to the European Court of Human Rights.
  - An AN-22 military transport aircraft carrying seven people crashes during a test flight in Ivanovo Oblast, killing everyone on board.
- 11 December – Two people are killed in an explosion at a laboratory of the Perm National Research Polytechnic University in Perm.
- 12 December – The Moscow City Court convicts International Criminal Court chief prosecutor Karim Ahmad Khan and eight ICC judges in absentia over their investigations into alleged war crimes by Russian nationals during the Russo-Ukrainian war and sentences them to up to 15 years' imprisonment.
- 12 December – A court in Moscow designates Pussy Riot as an "extremist organization".
- 14 December – FIDE allows Russian chess players to compete under their national flag for the first time since the start of the Russo-Ukrainian war in 2022.
- 15 December – President Putin signs a law allowing the clearing of forests deemed to have lost their ecological, water-protection and other protective functions along Lake Baikal.
- 16 December –
  - One person is killed while another is injured in a knife attack at a high school in Gorki-2, Moscow Oblast.
  - The government designates Deutsche Welle as an "undesirable organization".
  - A court in Yekaterinburg sentences five self-described Marxists from Bashkortostan to up to 22 years' imprisonment on charges of terrorism and plotting a coup.
- 22 December –
  - The head of the Operational Training Directorate of the Russian General Staff, Lieutenant General Fanil Sarvarov, is killed in a car bombing in Moscow.
  - The Federal Service for Supervision in Education and Science suspends the operating license of the Moscow School for the Social and Economic Sciences amid allegations over poor accreditation and quality issues.
  - A court in Mordovia issues the first fine issued in Russia for the offense of coercing a woman to undertake an abortion.
  - The State Duma dismisses 15 parliamentary aides for illegally selling seats at legislative roundtables to outside individuals and business groups that were supposed to be free.
- 24 December – Three people, including two police officers and the suspect, are killed in an suspected bomb attack in Moscow.
- 25 December –
  - The FSB says it had killed a person accused of plotting bomb attacks in Kaluga Oblast following a shootout.
  - A court-martial in Moscow sentences far-left activist Sergei Udaltsov to six years' imprisonment on charges of "justifying terrorism" regarding his support for a Marxist group arrested in Ufa for terrorism-related offenses in 2022.
- 26 December –
  - A court in Kursk Oblast sentences former Kursk Oblast Duma deputy Maxim Vasilyev to 5.5 years' imprisonment on charges of embezzling funds meant to strengthen the region's defenses along the border with Ukraine.
  - The first two stations of the Krasnoselsk-Kalininskaya Line of the Saint Petersburg Metro are opened.
- 29 December –
  - President Putin signs a law relieving Russian courts of obligations to enforce criminal rulings issued by foreign courts or international judicial bodies to which Russia is not a member.
  - The government designates George Washington University as an "undesirable organization".
  - Foreign Minister Sergey Lavrov accuses Ukraine of carrying out an unsuccessful drone attack on Putin's residence near Lake Valdayskoye in Novgorod Oblast.

== Holidays ==
- 1–7 January – New Year's Day and Holidays
- 7 January – Christmas (Orthodox)
- 23 February – Defender of the Fatherland Day
- 24 February – Defender of the Fatherland Holiday
- 8 March – International Women's Day
- 10 March – International Women's Day Holiday
- 1 May – Spring and Labour Day
- 9 May – Victory Day
- 12 June – Russia Day
- 4 November – Unity Day

== Deaths ==
- 1 January:
  - Viktor Alksnis, 74, politician, mayor of Tuchkovo (2013–2015), MP (2000–2007), and deputy of the Soviet Union (1989–1991).
  - Vladimir Kosykh, 74, politician, MP (1993–1995).
- 10 January: Yevgenia Dobrovolskaya, 60, actress (Queen Margot, The Irony of Fate 2, Guys from Mars).
- 29 January:
  - Vadim Naumov, 55, Olympic figure skater (1992, 1994), world champion (1994)
  - Evgenia Shishkova, 52, Olympic figure skater (1992, 1994), world champion (1994)
- 27 February: Boris Spassky, 88, chess grandmaster, world champion (1969–1972).
- 13 March: Sofia Gubaidulina, 93, composer.
- 21 March: Oleg Gordievsky, 86, KGB double-agent.
- 5 April: Pasha Technique, 40, rapper
- 22 April: Zurab Tsereteli, 91, Georgian-born sculptor, president of the Russian Academy of Arts (since 1997)
- 5 May: Pavel Kachkayev, 73, MP (since 2011)
- 19 May:
  - Yury Grigorovich, 98, ballet dancer and choreographer
  - Yuri Vladimirov, 83, ballet dancer and choreographer
- 4 June: Tatiana Sakharova, 51, senator (since 2021)
- 4 July: Andrei Badalov, 62, vice president of Transneft (since 2021)
- 7 July: Roman Starovoit, 53, governor of Kursk Oblast (2019–2024) and minister of transport (2024–2025)
- 11 July: Vadim Medvedev, 96, former Secretary of the Secretariat of the Communist Party of the Soviet Union and Member of the Politburo
- 17 July: Evgeny Krasavin, 83, scientist
- 18 July: Olga Sirotinina, 102, linguist
- 19 July:
  - Rezeda Sharafieva, 59, singer
  - Elena Zhambalova, 38, poet
- 22 July:
  - Irina Podnosova, 72, chief justice (since 2024)
  - Mikhail Tarasenko, 77, MP (since 2007)
- 28 July: Stepan Zhiryakov, 77, senator (2013–2018)
- 31 July: Derk Sauer, 72, Dutch-born journalist and media proprietor, founder of The Moscow Times
- 12 August: Kseniya Alexandrova, 30, model
- 21 August: Viktor Vidmanov, 91, politician, MP (2003–2007).
- 19 August: Konstantin Polozov, 59, ice hockey player.
- 22 August:
  - Ruggero Gilyarevsky, 95, philologist.
  - Yuriy Rudnev, 70, futsal coach.
- 29 August:
  - Rodion Shchedrin, 92, composer (Lolita, Carmen Suite) and pianist.
  - Stanislav Tarasov, 72, political scientist.
  - Irina Zorina, 87, historian, writer and translator.
- 30 August: Evgeny Levitan, 81, pianist.
- 26 September: Tigran Keosayan, 59, film director, actor and television presenter.
- 2 November: Igor Palmin, 92, photographer and journalist.
- 3 November: Valery Borshchyov, 81, human rights activist, member of the Mossoviet (1990–1993), MP (1993–1999).
- 9 November: Erik Bulatov, 92, artist.
- 25 November: Valerian Sobolev, 87, weapons designer.
- 6 December: Aleksandr Matsegora, 70, ambassador to North Korea (since 2014).
- 13 December: Filip Naumenko, 39, politician, mayor of Reutov (since 2023).
- 14 December: Levon Oganezov, 84, musician, composer and actor.
- 17 December: Dmitry Kachin, 96, member of the Soviet of the Union (1974–1989).
- 18 December: Mikhail Malyshev, 60, convicted murderer and cannibal.
- 22 December – Fanil Sarvarov, military officer, head of the Operational Training Directorate of the General Staff.
- 25 December – Vera Alentova, 83, actress (Moscow Does Not Believe in Tears, Shirli-myrli, The Envy of Gods).
