= Talovy =

Talovy (Russian: Таловый; masculine), Talovaya (Таловая; feminine), or Talovoye (Таловое; neuter) is the name of several inhabited localities in Russia.

Urban localities

- Talovaya, Talovsky District, Voronezh Oblast, a work settlement under the administrative jurisdiction of Talovskoye Urban Settlement in Talovsky District of Voronezh Oblast

Rural localities

- Talovy, Primorsky Krai, a settlement in Pogranichny District of Primorsky Krai
- Talovy, Rostov Oblast, a khutor in Kamyshevskoye Rural Settlement of Orlovsky District of Rostov Oblast
- Talovy, Volgograd Oblast, a khutor in Sukhodolsky Selsoviet of Sredneakhtubinsky District of Volgograd Oblast
- Talovoye, a selo in Krasnovsky Selsoviet of Pervomaysky District of Orenburg Oblast
- Talovaya, Kemerovo Oblast, a village in Kostenkovskaya Rural Territory of Novokuznetsky District of Kemerovo Oblast
- Talovaya, Balakhtinsky District, Krasnoyarsk Krai, a village under the administrative jurisdiction of the work settlement of Balakhta in Balakhtinsky District of Krasnoyarsk Krai
- Talovaya, Dzerzhinsky District, Krasnoyarsk Krai, a village in Nizhnetanaysky Selsoviet of Dzerzhinsky District of Krasnoyarsk Krai
- Talovaya, Tyumen Oblast, a village in Slobodchikovsky Rural Okrug of Aromashevsky District of Tyumen Oblast
- Talovaya, Verkhnekhavsky District, Voronezh Oblast, a village in Verkhnekhavskoye Rural Settlement of Verkhnekhavsky District of Voronezh Oblast
