= Uglyanets =

Uglyanets Углянец
- Selo
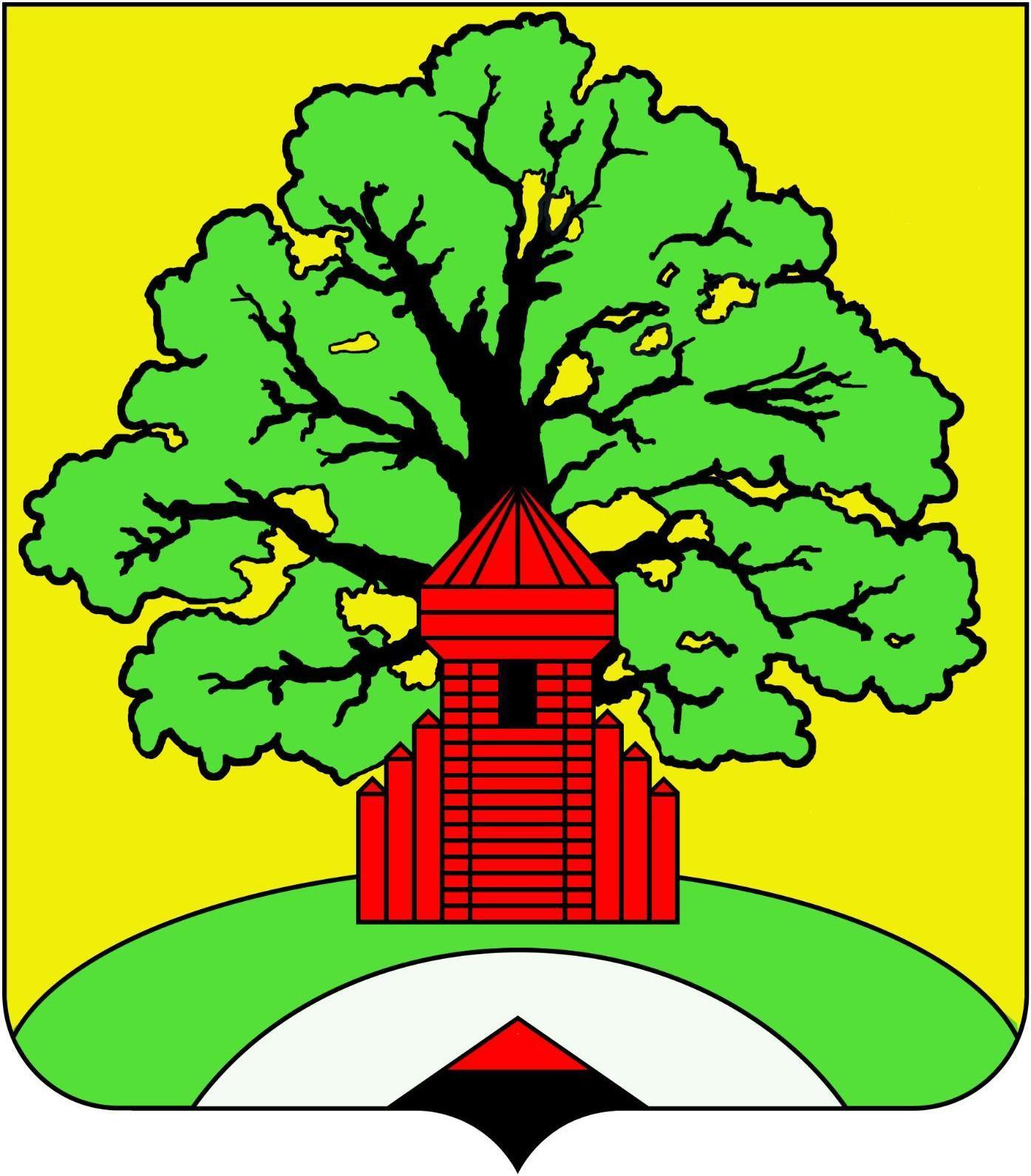
- The coat of Uglyanets

- Location within Voronezh Oblast Location within Russia
- Coordinates: 51°49′10″N 39°35′20″E
- Country: Russia
- Region: Voronezh Oblast
- District: Verkhnekhavsky District
- Time zone: UTC+3:00

Uglyanets (Russian: Углянец) is a rural locality (a selo) and the administrative center of Uglyanskoye Rural Settlement, Verkhnekhavsky District, Voronezh Oblast, Russia. The population was 4,151 (2021 census); 3,658 as of 2010. There are 53 streets.

== Geography ==
Uglyanets is located 38 km west of Verkhnyaya Khava (the district's administrative centre) by road. Podlesny is the nearest rural locality.

== Cultural heritage ==
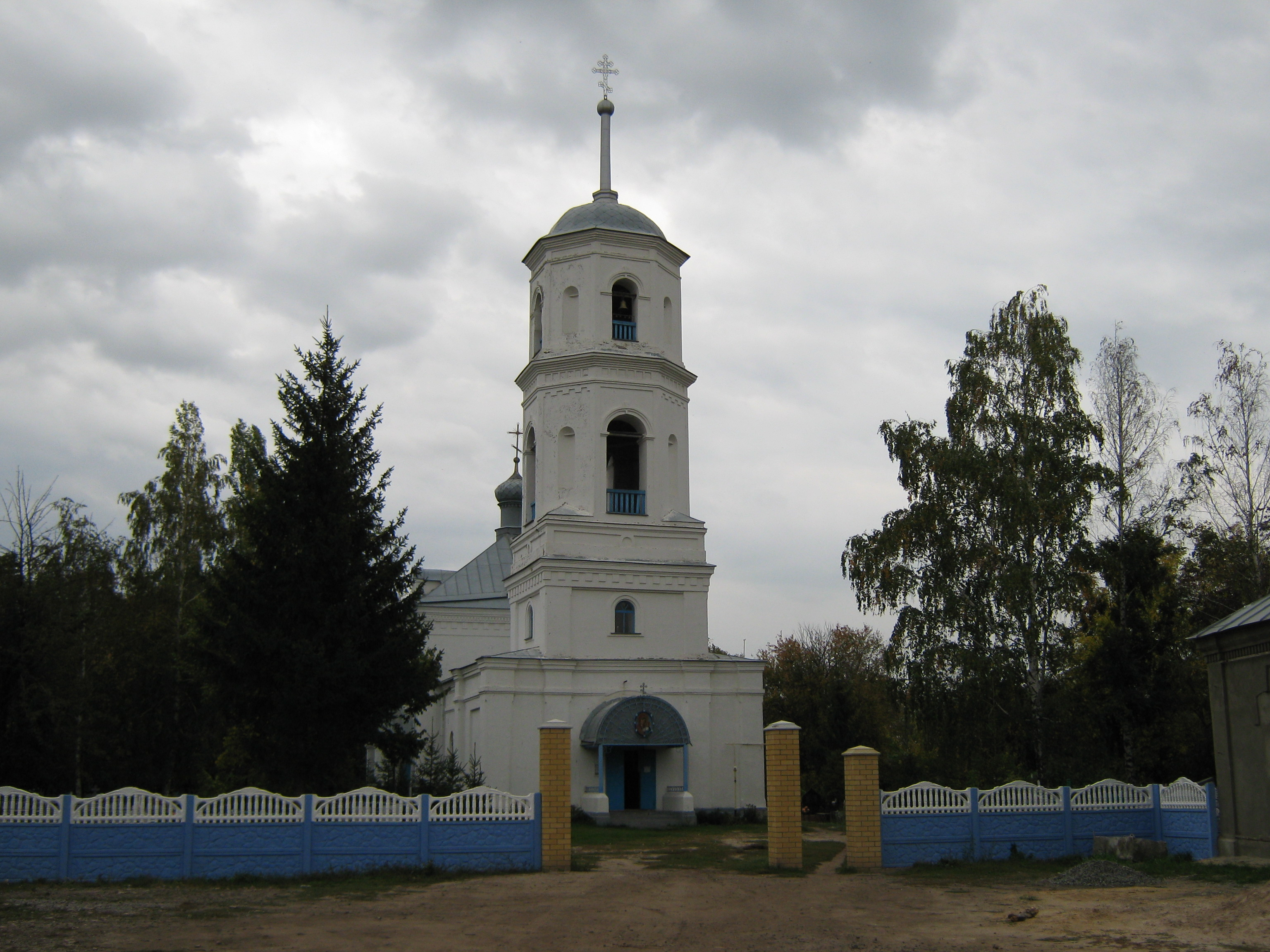
Church of the Kazan Icon of the Mother of God

Stephen's Church (Our Lady of Kazan) is located in Uglyanets. According to the decree of the Voronezh regional administration N 850 dated August 14, 1995, Stephen's Church has been designated as an object of historical and cultural heritage.
