= Maly Samovets =

Maly Samovets Малый Самовец
- Settlement
- Location within Voronezh Oblast Location within Russia
- Coordinates: 51°55′N 40°19′E
- Country: Russia
- Region: Voronezh Oblast
- District: Verkhnekhavsky District
- Time zone: UTC+3:00

Maly Samovets (Russian: Малый Самовец) is a rural locality (a settlement) and the administrative center of Malosamovetskoye Rural Settlement, Verkhnekhavsky District, Voronezh Oblast, Russia. The population was 79 as of 2010. There are 7 streets.

== Geography ==
Maly Samovets is located 34 km northeast of Verkhnyaya Khava (the district's administrative centre) by road. Verkhnyaya Plavitsa is the nearest rural locality.
