= Plyasovatka =

Plyasovatka Плясоватка
- Selo
- Location within Voronezh Oblast Location within Russia
- Coordinates: 51°53′N 40°06′E
- Country: Russia
- Region: Voronezh Oblast
- District: Verkhnekhavsky District
- Time zone: UTC+3:00

Plyasovatka (Russian: Плясоватка) is a rural locality (a selo) and the administrative center of Plyasovatskoye Rural Settlement, Verkhnekhavsky District, Voronezh Oblast, Russia. The population was 259 as of 2010. There are 3 streets.

== Geography ==
Plyasovatka is located 17 km northeast of Verkhnyaya Khava (the district's administrative centre) by road. Pokrovka is the nearest rural locality.
