= Grushino =

Grushino Грушино
- Selo
- Location within Voronezh Oblast Location within Russia
- Coordinates: 51°50′N 39°48′E
- Country: Russia
- Region: Voronezh Oblast
- District: Verkhnekhavsky District
- Time zone: UTC+3:00

Grushino (Russian: Грушино) is a rural locality (a selo) in Spasskoye Rural Settlement, Verkhnekhavsky District, Voronezh Oblast, Russia. The population was 124 in 2010. There are three streets.

== Geography ==
Grushino is located 12 kilometres (7.5 mi) west of Verkhnyaya Khava (the district's administrative centre) by road. Vishnyovka is the nearest rural locality.
