= Andreyevka 1-ya =

Andreyevka 1-ya Андреевка 1-я
- Village
- Location within Voronezh Oblast Location within Russia
- Coordinates: 51°45′N 39°51′E
- Country: Russia
- Region: Voronezh Oblast
- District: Verkhnekhavsky District
- Time zone: UTC+3:00

Andreyevka 1-ya (Russian: Андреевка 1-я) is a rural locality (a village) in Sukhogayovskoye Rural Settlement, Verkhnekhavsky District, Voronezh Oblast, Russia. The population was 72 as of 2010. There are 2 streets.

== Geography ==
Andreyevka 1-ya is located 13 km southwest of Verkhnyaya Khava (the district's administrative centre) by road. Sukhiye Gai is the nearest rural locality.
