= Shukayevka =

Shukayevka Шукавка
- Settlement
- Location within Voronezh Oblast Location within Russia
- Coordinates: 51°52′N 40°11′E
- Country: Russia
- Region: Voronezh Oblast
- District: Verkhnekhavsky District
- Time zone: UTC+3:00

Shukayevka (Russian: Шукавка) is a rural locality (a settlement) and the administrative center of Shukayevskoye Rural Settlement, Verkhnekhavsky District, Voronezh Oblast, Russia. The population was 593 as of 2010. There are 4 streets.

== Geography ==
Shukayevka is located 20 km east of Verkhnyaya Khava (the district's administrative centre) by road. Plyasovatka is the nearest rural locality.
