= Nikonovo, Voronezh Oblast =

Nikonovo Никоново
- Selo
- Location within Voronezh Oblast Location within Russia
- Coordinates: 51°47′N 39°35′E
- Country: Russia
- Region: Voronezh Oblast
- District: Verkhnekhavsky District
- Time zone: UTC+3:00

Nikonovo (Russian: Никоново) is a rural locality (a selo) in Parizhskokommunskoye Rural Settlement, Verkhnekhavsky District, Voronezh Oblast, Russia. The population was 548 as of 2010. There are 6 streets.

== Geography ==
Nikonovo is located 36 km southwest of Verkhnyaya Khava (the district's administrative centre) by road. Uglyanets is the nearest rural locality.
