= Bolshaya Privalovka =

Bolshaya Privalovka Большая Приваловка
- Selo
- Location within Voronezh Oblast Location within Russia
- Coordinates: 51°54′N 39°45′E
- Country: Russia
- Region: Voronezh Oblast
- District: Verkhnekhavsky District
- Time zone: UTC+3:00

Bolshaya Privalovka (Russian: Большая Приваловка) is a rural locality (a selo) and the administrative center of Bolsheprivalovskoye Rural Settlement, Verkhnekhavsky District, Voronezh Oblast, Russia. The population was 582 as of 2010. It has 13 streets.

== Geography ==
Bolshaya Privalovka is located 16 km northwest of Verkhnyaya Khava (the district's administrative centre), by road. Belovka is the nearest rural locality.
