= Podlesny, Verkhnekhavsky District, Voronezh Oblast =

Podlesny Подлесный
- Settlement
- Location within Voronezh Oblast Location within Russia
- Coordinates: 51°48′N 39°34′E
- Country: Russia
- Region: Voronezh Oblast
- District: Verkhnekhavsky District
- Time zone: UTC+3:00

Podlesny (Russian: Подлесный) is a rural locality (a settlement) in Uglyanskoye Rural Settlement, Verkhnekhavsky District, Voronezh Oblast, Russia. The population was 2,460 as of 2010. There are 30 streets.

== Geography ==
Podlesny is located 39 km west of Verkhnyaya Khava (the district's administrative centre) by road. Nikonovo is the nearest rural locality.
