= NIIOKH =

NIIOKH НИИОХ
- Settlement
- Location within Voronezh Oblast Location within Russia
- Coordinates: 51°50′N 39°49′E
- Country: Russia
- Region: Voronezh Oblast
- District: Verkhnekhavsky District
- Time zone: UTC+3:00

NIIOKH (Russian: НИИОХ) is a rural locality (a settlement) in Spasskoye Rural Settlement, Verkhnekhavsky District, Voronezh Oblast, Russia. The population was 256 as of 2010. There are 5 streets.

== Geography ==
NIIOKH is located 9 km west of Verkhnyaya Khava (the district's administrative centre) by road. Vishnyovka is the nearest rural locality.
