= Sukhiye Gai =

Sukhiye Gai Сухие Гаи
- Selo
- Location within Voronezh Oblast Location within Russia
- Coordinates: 51°46′N 39°52′E
- Country: Russia
- Region: Voronezh Oblast
- District: Verkhnekhavsky District
- Time zone: UTC+3:00

Sukhiye Gai (Russian: Сухие Гаи) is a rural locality (a selo) and the administrative center of Sukhogayovskoye Rural Settlement, Verkhnekhavsky District, Voronezh Oblast, Russia. The population was 381 as of 2010. There are 8 streets.

== Geography ==
Sukhiye Gai is located 11 km southwest of Verkhnyaya Khava (the district's administrative centre) by road. Dmitro-Pokrovskoye is the nearest rural locality.
