= Verkhnyaya Baygora =

Verkhnyaya Baygora Верхняя Байгора
- Selo
- Location within Voronezh Oblast Location within Russia
- Coordinates: 51°55′N 39°52′E
- Country: Russia
- Region: Voronezh Oblast
- District: Verkhnekhavsky District
- Time zone: UTC+3:00

Verkhnyaya Baygora (Russian: Верхняя Байгора) is a rural locality (a selo) in Nizhnebaygorskoye Rural Settlement, Verkhnekhavsky District, Voronezh Oblast, Russia. The population was 396 as of 2010. There are 10 streets.

== Geography ==
Verkhnyaya Baygora is located 15 km north of Verkhnyaya Khava (the district's administrative centre) by road. Nizhnyaya Baygora is the nearest rural locality.
