= Zheldayevka =

Zheldayevka Желдаевка
- Settlement
- Location within Voronezh Oblast Location within Russia
- Coordinates: 51°51′N 39°38′E
- Country: Russia
- Region: Voronezh Oblast
- District: Verkhnekhavsky District
- Time zone: UTC+3:00

Zheldayevka (Russian: Желдаевка) is a rural locality (a settlement) in Maloprivalovskoye Rural Settlement, Verkhnekhavsky District, Voronezh Oblast, Russia. The population was 79 as of 2010. There are 2 streets.

== Geography ==
Zheldayevka is located 21 km west of Verkhnyaya Khava (the district's administrative centre) by road. Yenino is the nearest rural locality.
