= Volya, Verkhnekhavsky District, Voronezh Oblast =

Volya Воля
- Settlement
- Location within Voronezh Oblast Location within Russia
- Coordinates: 51°52′N 40°17′E
- Country: Russia
- Region: Voronezh Oblast
- District: Verkhnekhavsky District
- Time zone: UTC+3:00

Volya (Russian: Воля) is a rural locality (a settlement) in Shukayevskoye Rural Settlement, Verkhnekhavsky District, Voronezh Oblast, Russia. The population was 58 as of 2010.

== Geography ==
Volya is located 28 km east of Verkhnyaya Khava (the district's administrative centre) by road. Aleksandrovka is the nearest rural locality.
