= Naumenko =

Naumenko (Ukrainian: Науменко) is a Ukrainian-language surname. It may refer to:

- Aleksandr Naumenko, several people
- Filipp Naumenko (1985–2025), Russian politician
- Gregg Naumenko (born 1977), American ice hockey player
- Irina Karpova, née Naumenko (born 1980), Kazakhstani heptathlete
- John Newman (Australian politician) (formerly John Naumenko, 1946–1994), Australian politician
- Liudmyla Naumenko (born 1993), Ukrainian basketball player
- Mike Naumenko (1955–1991), Soviet musician
- Nick Naumenko (born 1974), American ice hockey player
- Nikolai Naumenko (1901–1967), Soviet military aviator
- Oleg Naumenko (born 1986), Ukrainian wheelchair fencer
- Oleksiy-Nestor Naumenko (born 1973), Ukrainian film director, screenwriter, cinematographer, and producer
- Olga Naumenko (born 1949), Russian actress
- Pavlo Naumenko (1965–2023), Ukrainian aerospace engineer
- Stepan Naumenko (1920–2004), Soviet pilot
- Vladlen Naumenko (1947–2024), Soviet footballer
- Volodymyr Pavlovych Naumenko (1852–1919), Ukrainian pedagogue and community leader
- Vyacheslav Naumenko (1883–1979), Kuban Cossack leader
