= Stephen's Church (Our Lady of Kazan) =

Church building in Uglyanets, Russia

Coordinates: 51°49′14″N 39°35′51″E

- Our Lady of Kazan
- Церковь Архидиакона Стефана (Казанской иконы Божией Матери)
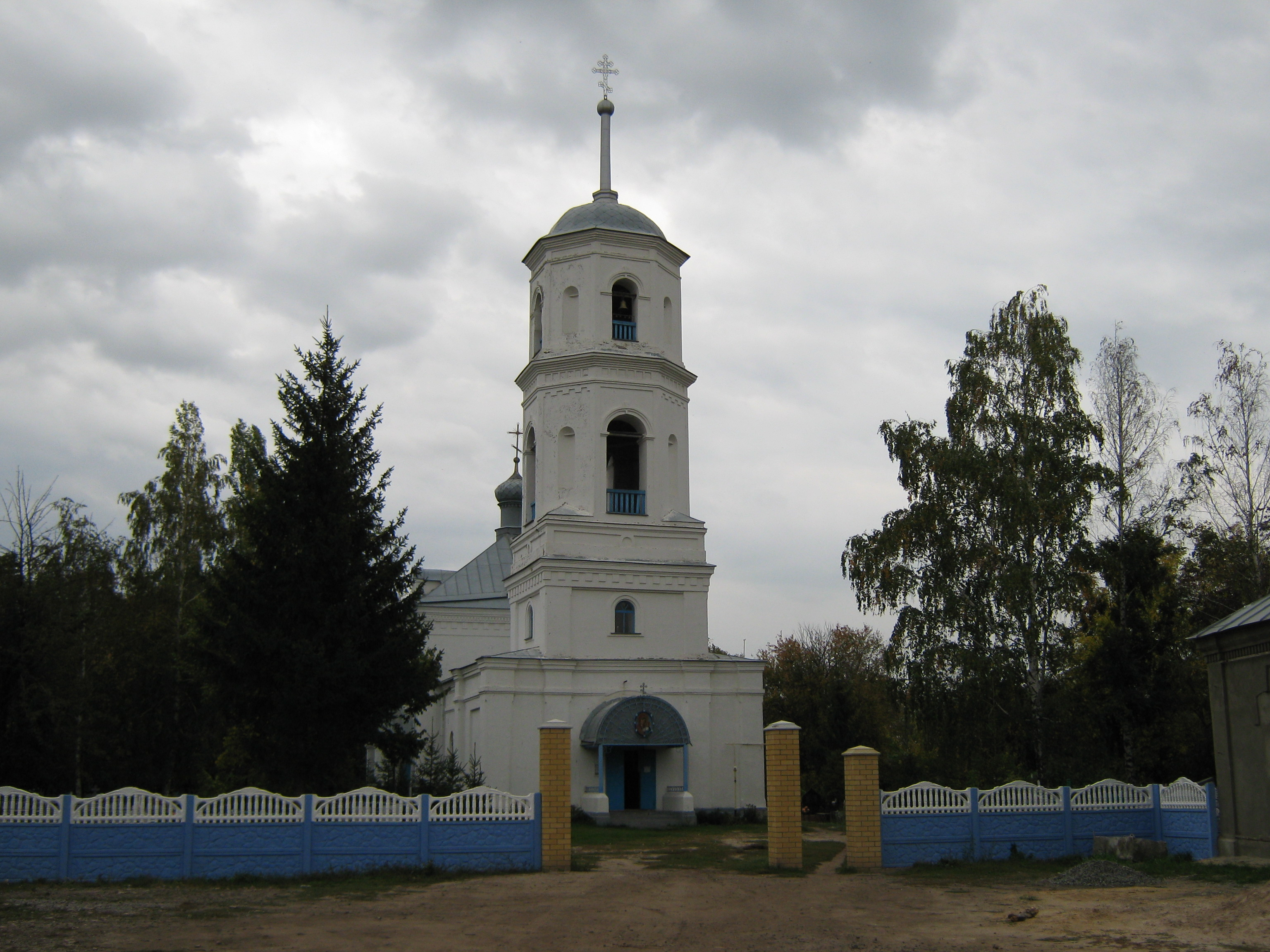
- Stephen's Church
- Location: Russia

History
- Status: functioning
- Founded: 1645

Stephen's Church (Our Lady of Kazan) (in Russian: Церковь Стефана (Казанской иконы Божией Матери)) - is a Russian Orthodox church of the Diocese of Voronezh, in the village of Uglyanets, Verkhnekhavsky District, Voronezh Oblast.

== History ==
The construction date of the first wooden church building was in the middle of the 17th century.

In the second half of the 19th century, a parish school was established on the territory of the church, there were about twenty children of rich people from the village of Uglyanets studied.

In 1868, at the expense of the local landowner Kryzhev, a stone church with the same name was built in place of the old one. The church was located in the center of the village. From 1896 to 1918 the rector of the church was a prist Alexander Yakovlevich Korablinov. His son Vladimir Korablinov was born in Uglyanets and became a famous Soviet writer.

The beginning of the 20th century marked the start of difficult times for the church. First, on October 20, 1914, a major fire occurred, which destroyed a significant portion of the structure. In 1934, as directed by the new Soviet authorities, the church's bells were removed. And finally, in 1937, the Uglyanets church was closed.

From the 1930s to the 1990s, the church was used as a warehouse. After the collapse of the Soviet Union, it was handed over to the diocese of Voronezh.

== Architecture ==
The church is made of brick. The architectural design is common for all churches in rural areas during those times.

== Current status ==
According to the decree of the Voronezh regional administration N 850 dated August 14, 1995, Stephen's Church has been designated as an object of historical and cultural heritage.

== Gallery ==
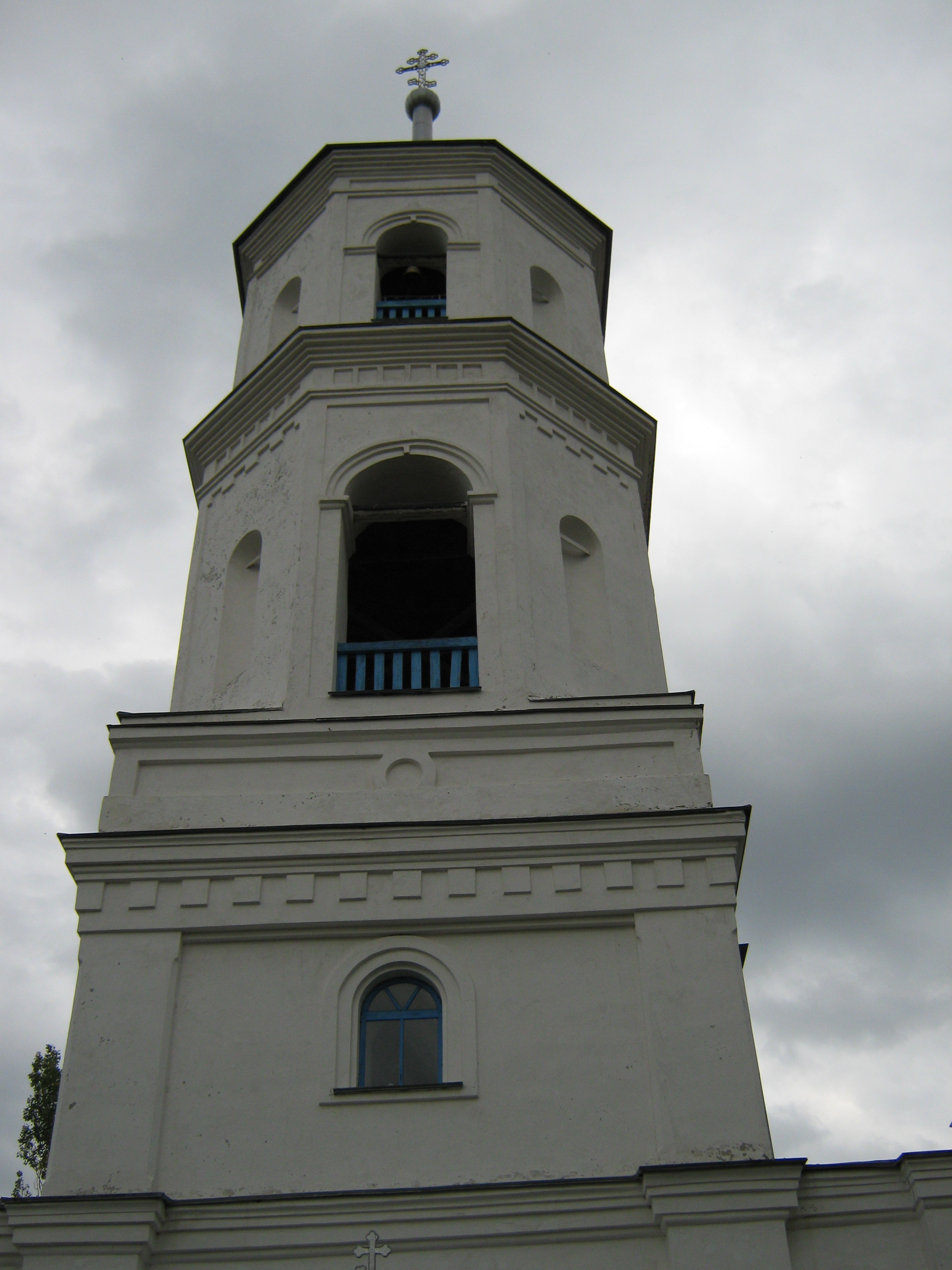

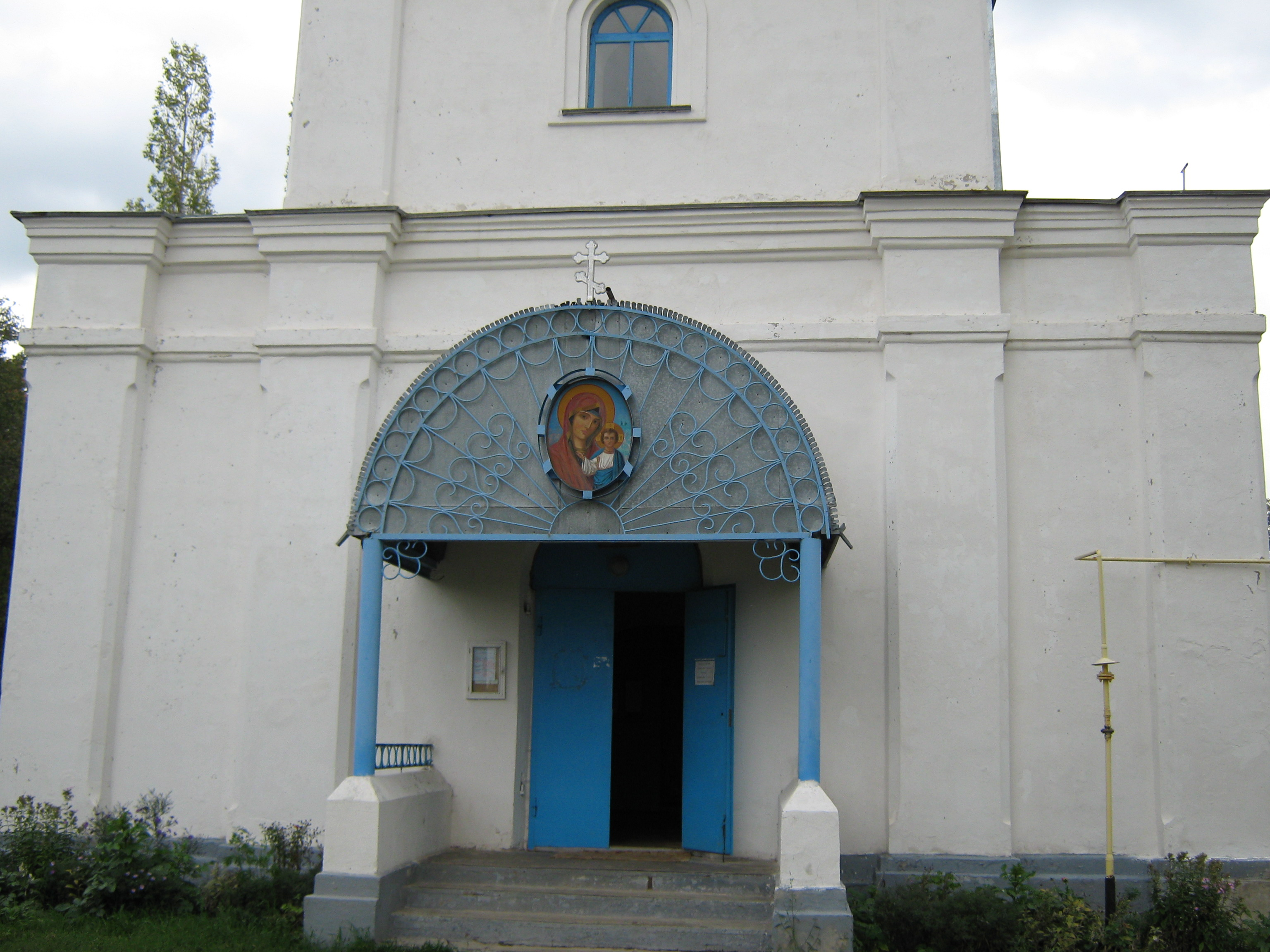

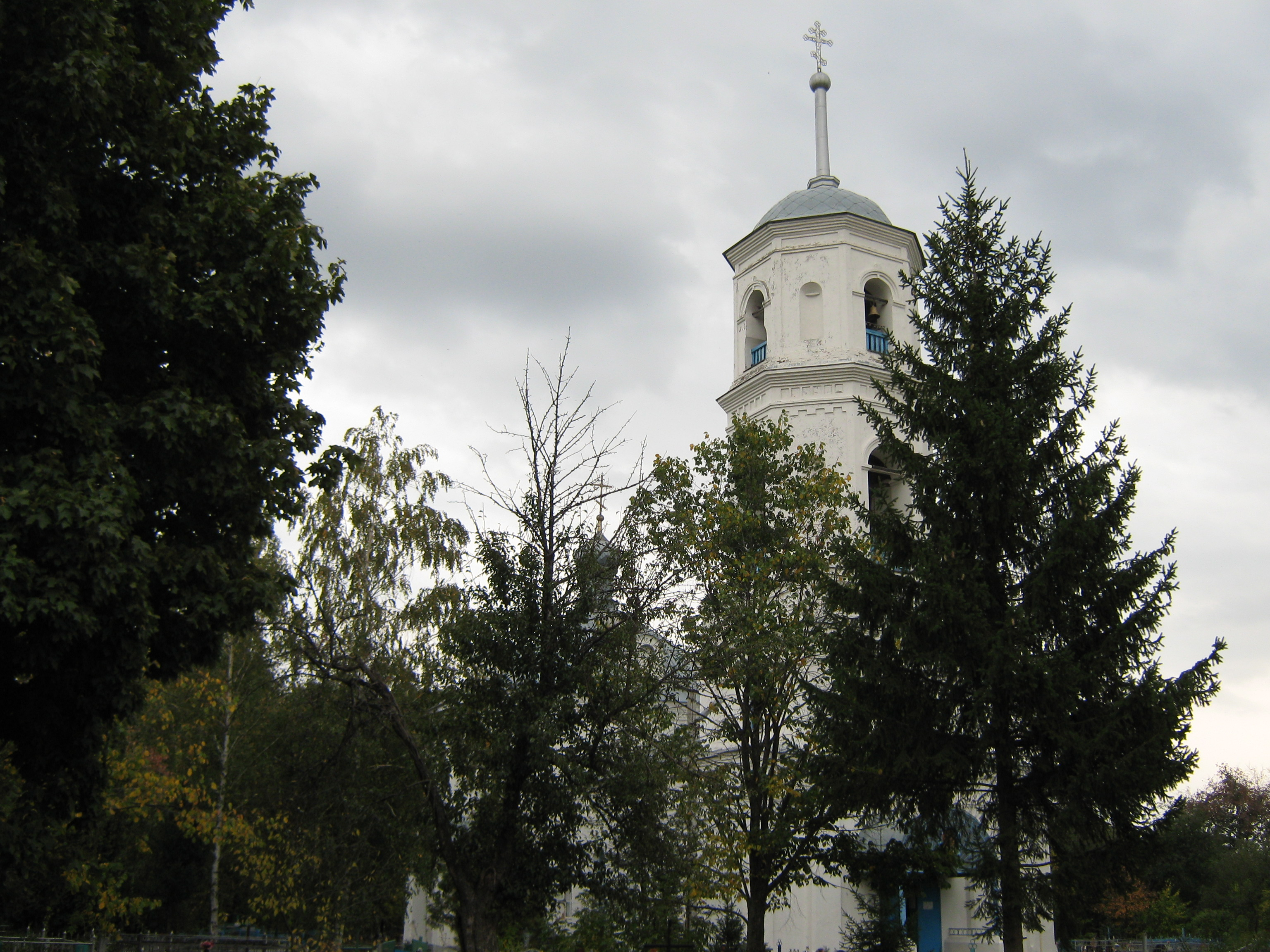
