= List of Kazan Universities =

There are 44 institutes of higher education in Kazan, including 19 branches of universities from other cities. More than 140 000 students are educated in the city. Most prominent universities are:

- Kazan Federal University - founded in 1804, third oldest university in Russian Federation after Saint Petersburg State University (1724) and Moscow State University (1755). In 2009 it got Federal status as main university of Volga Region
- Kazan National Research Technological University - founded in 1919 on the base of pre-existing vocational school;
- Kazan State Technical University - founded in 1932. In 2009 it got status of National university;
- Kazan State Medical University - founded in 1814 as a department within Kazan State University;
- Kazan State Academy of Veterinary Medicine - founded in 1873;
- Kazan State University of Architecture and Engineering - founded in 1919 on the base of pre-existing vocational school;
- Kazan State Agrarian University - founded in 1922;
- Kazan State Conservatory - founded in 1945;
- Kazan State Energetics University - founded in 1968 as a branch of Moscow Power Engineering Institute;
- Kazan State University of Culture and Arts - founded in 1969 as a branch of Leningrad State Institute of Culture;
- Kazan Institute of Social and Humanitarian Knowledge - founded in 1991;
- Academy of Management «TISBI» - founded in 1992;
- Kazan Institute for Economics, Management and Law - founded in 1994;
- Russian Islamic University - founded in 1998;
- Kazan Institute of Finance, Economics and Informatics - founded in 2003;
