= National research university =

Kind of academic institution in Russia

National Research University of Russia (NRU, Russian: Национальный исследовательский университет России, romanized: Natsionalniy issledovatelskiy universitet Rossii) is a status granted to universities on a competitive basis for a revocable period of ten years. Institutions awarded this status are required to integrate both education and research into their operations.

== Competition ==
The aim of the competition was to select universities that not only provided effective professional training but were also capable of integrating scientific research into their institutional activities.

The competition was organized by the Russian Ministry of Education and Science. In order to obtain the status of a National Research University, applicants were evaluated on factors including the university's current condition and development dynamics, staff development, educational and research infrastructure, the effectiveness of education, science and innovation activities, internationally recognized indicators of quality and relevance, and the anticipated impact of awarding the status.

== Revocation of status ==
Universities are required to report regularly on the implementation of their development programs. The status may be revoked.

== History ==
The National Research University project was launched on 7 October 2008. In the same year, the President of the Russian Federation issued a decree "On the implementation of the pilot project to establish national research universities". Under the same decree, the Moscow Engineering Physics Institute and the National University of Science and Technology MISIS were granted National Research University status without competition as the first institutions to receive it.

On 13 July 2009, the Government of the Russian Federation issued a resolution establishing an open competition among Russian universities for National Research University status. The official launch of the competition took place on 31 July 2009. Of the 110 applications submitted, 28 finalists were selected. On 17 October 2009, a commission determined the 12 winners.

On 5 February 2010, an order was issued to conduct a second competition. This competition received 128 applications. From 32 finalists, a commission selected 15 universities to be granted National Research University status. The list was approved by the government on 20 May 2010.

== List of NRU ==
1. National University of Science and Technology MISIS
2. Moscow Engineering Physics Institute
3. Belgorod State University
4. Higher School of Economics
5. Irkutsk National Research Technical University
6. Kazan National Research Technical University
7. Kazan National Research Technological University
8. Mordovian State University
9. Moscow Aviation Institute
10. National Research University of Electronic Technology
11. Moscow State University of Civil Engineering
12. Bauman Moscow State Technical University
13. Moscow Institute of Physics and Technology
14. Moscow Power Engineering Institute
15. N. I. Lobachevsky State University of Nizhny Novgorod
16. Novosibirsk State University
17. Perm National Research Polytechnic University
18. Perm State National Research University
19. Russian National Research Medical University
20. Gubkin Russian State University of Oil and Gas
21. Samara University
22. Saint Petersburg Mining University
23. Peter the Great St. Petersburg Polytechnic University
24. ITMO University
25. Saint Petersburg Academic University
26. Saratov State University
27. Tomsk Polytechnic University
28. Tomsk State University
29. South Ural State University

== See also ==
- Research university
