= Talovaya, Verkhnekhavsky District, Voronezh Oblast =

Talovaya Таловая
- Village
- Location within Voronezh Oblast Location within Russia
- Coordinates: 51°48′N 39°55′E
- Country: Russia
- Region: Voronezh Oblast
- District: Verkhnekhavsky District
- Time zone: UTC+3:00

Talovaya (Russian: Таловая) is a rural locality (a village) in Verkhnekhavskoye Rural Settlement, Verkhnekhavsky District, Voronezh Oblast, Russia. The population was 104 as of 2010.

== Geography ==
Talovaya is located 6 km south of Verkhnyaya Khava (the district's administrative centre) by road. Verkhnyaya Khava is the nearest rural locality.
