= Dmitry Kachin =

Russian politician (1929–2025)

- Дмитрий Качин

Member of the Soviet of the Union for Kamchatka Oblast
- In office 25 July 1974 – 1989

Personal details
- Born: Dmitry Ivanovich Kachin; 7 November 1929 Bolshaya Rechka, Buryat ASSR, Russian SFSR, USSR
- Died: 17 December 2025 (aged 96) Moscow, Russia
- Party: CPSU
- Education: Kaliningrad State Technical University
- Occupation: Fisherman

Dmitry Ivanovich Kachin (Russian: Дми́трий Ива́нович Ка́чин; 7 November 1929 – 17 December 2025) was a Russian and Soviet politician and diplomat. A member of the Communist Party of the Soviet Union, he served in the Soviet of the Union from 1974 to 1989.

Kachin died in Moscow on 17 December 2025, at the age of 96.
