= Elena Zhambalova =

Russian poet (1986–2025)

- Еле́на Алекса́ндровна Жамба́лова
- Born: 22 September 1986; Balakhta, Balakhtinsky District, Krasnoyarsk Krai, Russian SFSR, USSR
- Died: 19 July 2025 (aged 38)
- Education: Buryat State University
- Writing career
- Genre: Poetry

Elena Alexandrovna Zhambalova (ru:Еле́на Алекса́ндровна Жамба́лова; 22 September 1986 – 19 July 2025) was a Russian poet.

== Life and career ==
Zhambalova was born in Balakhta on 22 September 1986. She studied in the Department of Philology at Buryat State University, graduating in 2008.

She had works published in various publications, including the magazines Baikal, Siberian Lights, Znamya, New Youth, Lights of Kuzbass, and Literaturnaya Gazeta.

Zhambalova married and had four children; she and her family lived in Erkhirik in Buryatia.

Zhambalova died from a cardiac arrest on 19 July 2025, at the age of 38.

== Awards and recognition ==
- 2018 Lyceum Award.
- 2018 Leader of Culture, Ministry of Culture of Buryatia
