= Rezeda Sharafieva =

Russian singer (1966–2025)

Rezeda Sharafieva (ru: Резеда Дамировна Шарафиева; 10 January 1966 – 19 July 2025) was a Russian singer.

== Life and career ==
Sharafieva was born 10 January 1966 in the village of Naratly-Kichu in the Menzelinsky District. Following graduation from the pedagogical Menzelinsky educational institution, she participated in various creative performances, including in the ensemble "Serdash". Beginning in 2001 she worked at the Kazan City Philharmonic. In 2003 she graduated from the theater faculty of the Kazan State University of Culture and Arts.

In 2016 she was awarded the People's Artist of the Republic of Tatarstan.

She died after a long battle with cancer on 19 July 2025, at the age of 59.
