= Yuriy Rudnev =

Russian futsal coach (1954–2025)

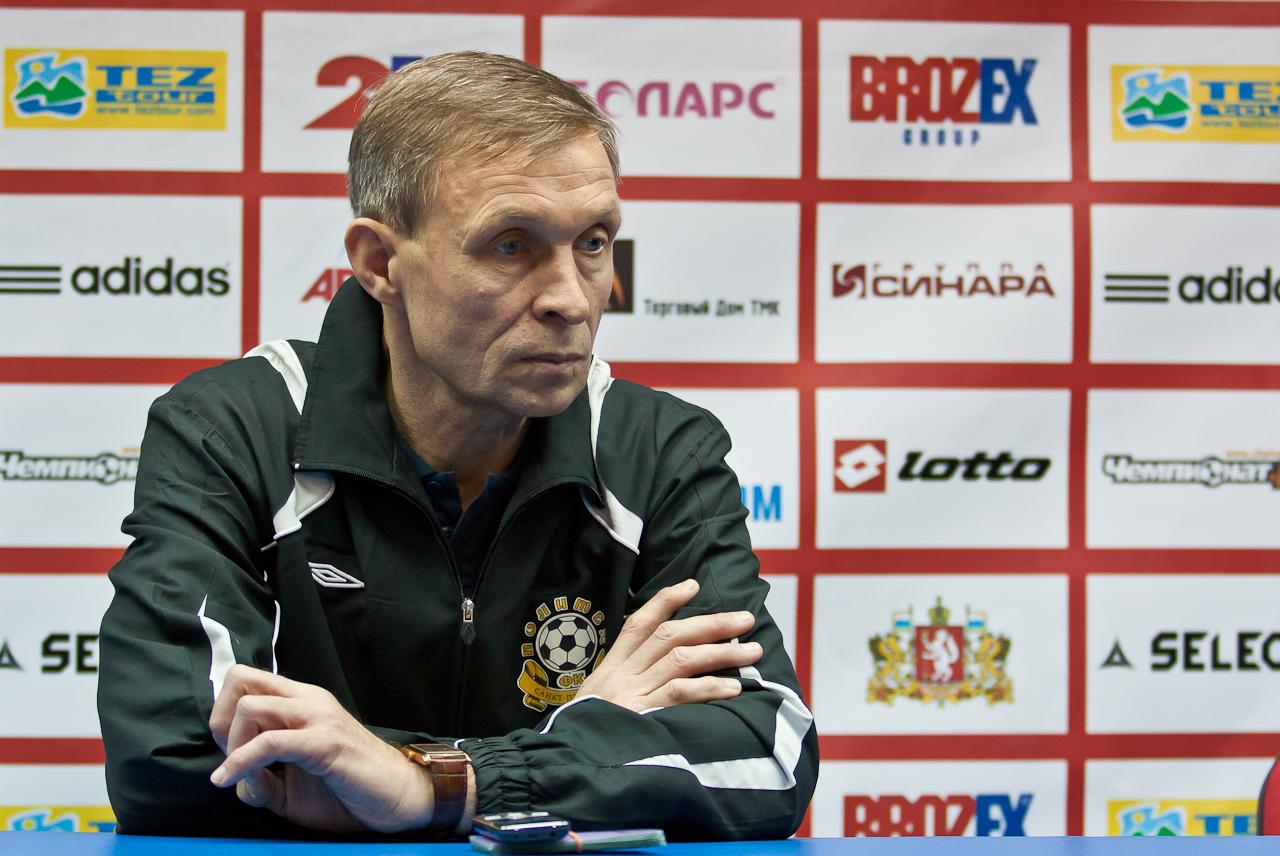
Rudnev in 2011

Yuriy Rudnev (Russian: Юрий Николаевич Руднев; 19 December 1954 – 21 August 2025) was a Russian futsal coach.

== Biography ==
Rudnev's playing career took place in Kirovets Leningrad. After retiring, he took the position of coach and then head coach at the club. In 1993, he switched to futsal, coaching the St. Petersburg clubs Galax and Zenit in 1993–1999, and Norilsk Nickel in the 1999–2000 season. Then he joined the coaching staff of Spartak, helping the club to become champions in the 2000/01 season, after which he coached the local Unity St. Petersburg for one season.

Leading Alfa Yekaterinburg, Rudnev led the club to victories in the Russian Futsal Cup and the European Futsal Cup Winners Cup. After the breakup of Alfa, he headed another Yekaterinburg club VIZ-Sinara with which he achieved victory in the regular season and third place in the playoffs.

In 2003, he headed Dynamo Moscow with whom he became the champion in his first season. In 2005, he left Dynamo but after coaching Norilsk Nickel and TTG-Yava he returned two years later. In 2007, he led the club to victory in the UEFA Futsal Cup.

At the beginning of 2009, Rudnev was fired from Dynamo due to unsatisfactory results and replaced by Brazilian Sergio Sapo, but less than two months later he returned again. A year later, he was fired again, as the management of Dynamo Yamal was dissatisfied with the third place in the 2010–11 season.

From the summer of 2010, he headed the St. Petersburg Polytechnic University futsal team Politekh. He led the club to the best result in the history of the team – seventh place. In the next season, the team began to show more modest results, and Rudnev left it to soon head Dina Moscow. He led the club to the playoffs, where in the quarterfinals the team lost to Sibiryak on aggregate. The club's management did not renew the contract for the new season. In 2012, he headed the Novaya Generatsiya Syktyvkar club instead of Vadim Yashin who left for Sinara.

He then became the head coach of the futsal club Ukhta.

Rudnev died in Saint Petersburg on 21 August 2025, at the age of 70. He was buried at Southern (Yuzhnoe) Cemetery on 27 August.
