= Aleksandr Naumenko =

Aleksandr Naumenko, Alexandre Naumenko or Alexandre Naoumenko (Александр Науменко) may refer to the following notable people:

- Aleksandr Naumenko (footballer) (born 1997), Russian football player
- Aleksandr Naumenko (singer), Russian operatic tenor, vocal coach and composer

== See also ==
- Alyaksandr Naumenka (born 1970), Belarusian army officer
