= 2025 Plastmass Factory explosion =

Explosion in Chelyabinsk Oblast, Russia

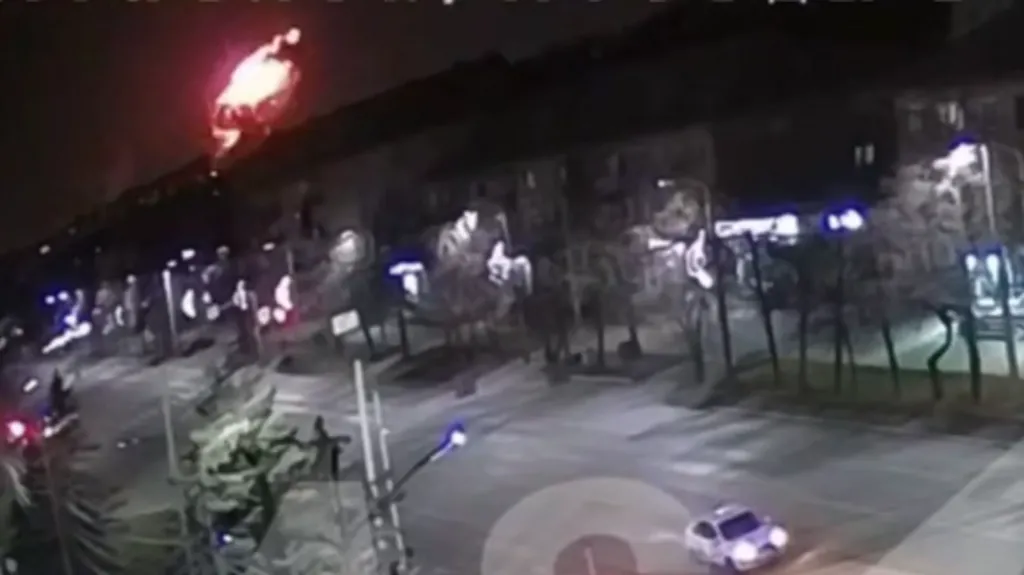
- A CCTV still of the explosion
- Date: 22 October 2025
- Time: c.22:30 (YEKT)
- Venue: Plastmass Factory
- Location: Kopeysk, Chelyabinsk Oblast, Russia; 55.124765°N 61.5675°E
- Type: Explosion
- Cause: Under investigation
- Filmed by: Closed-circuit television cameras
- Deaths: 23
- Injuries: 19

On 22 October 2025, an explosion and fire occurred at the Plastmass Factory in Kopeysk, Chelyabinsk Oblast, Russia, killing 23 people.

== Background ==
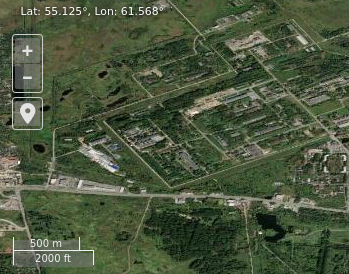
Satellite imagery of the factory prior to the explosion

The Plastmass Factory is located in Kopeysk in the Chelyabinsk region and is owned by Technodinamika, itself a holding company within the Rostec state corporation. The factory produces larger caliber munitions from 76 to 152 mm, Russian artillery shell calibers used by the Russian Army in the Russo-Ukrainian war.

== Explosion ==
On 22 October 2025 at around 22:30 one and then at around midnight a second explosion occurred. Local residents reportedly testified that at least 3 drones attacked the factory. Investigative outlet ASTRA reported that Russia's Investigative Committee opened a criminal case into 'alleged violations of industrial safety rules at a hazardous facility resulting in multiple deaths" – stating the blast was caused by breaches of safety during a technological process in a workshop.

Governor Aleksey Teksler stated that the cause of the explosion was not related to a drone attack. He also noted that the fire had been extinguished by the morning of 23 October but that there were still 10 people unaccounted for.

Later on 29 October 2025 Teksler announced that 23 people had died in the explosion.

== Reaction ==
Hundreds of residents gathered at Kopeysk central square to pay tribute to the victims and demanded news about the missing workers. They forced the head of a local labor union to read out the names of the 12 employees whose deaths have been confirmed. Governor Teksler was later seen laying flowers at a makeshift memorial, while Plastmass CEO Alexander Balashovtold residents, "It's hard to understand" how the tragedy occurred.

== See also ==
- Russian mystery fires
- 2025 Lesnoy factory explosion
