= Valerian Sobolev =

Russian weapons designer (1938–2025)

Valerian Markovich Sobolev (Russian: Валериан Маркович Соболев; 19 August 1938 – 25 November 2025) was a Russian weapons designer.

== Life and career ==
Sobalev was born in Stalingrad on 19 August 1938. He graduated from the Stalingrad Mechanical Institute with a degree in mechanical engineering in 1960. From 1960 to 1963, he worked at the Volgograd Tractor Plant.

Throughout his career, he worked as a lead designer at a number of companies, including the Titan Central Design Bureau, as well as being a developer of self-propelled launchers and ground equipment for strategic missile systems linked to Temp-2S intercontinental ballistic missiles (ICBMs).

In 1973, he was awarded the USSR State Prize and in 1977 the Lenin Prize.

Sobolev died on 25 November 2025, at the age of 87.
