= Talovy, Volgograd Oblast =

Talovy Таловый
- Khutor
- Location within Volgograd Oblast Location within Russia
- Coordinates: 48°35′N 44°55′E
- Country: Russia
- Region: Volgograd Oblast
- District: Sredneakhtubinsky District
- Time zone: UTC+4:00

Talovy (Russian: Таловый) is a rural locality (a khutor) in Sukhodolskoye Rural Settlement, Sredneakhtubinsky District, Volgograd Oblast, Russia. The population was 26 as of 2010. There is 1 street.

== Geography ==
Talovy is located 17 km southeast of Srednyaya Akhtuba (the district's administrative centre) by road. Sukhodol is the nearest rural locality.
