= Olga Sirotinina =

Russian linguist (1923–2025)

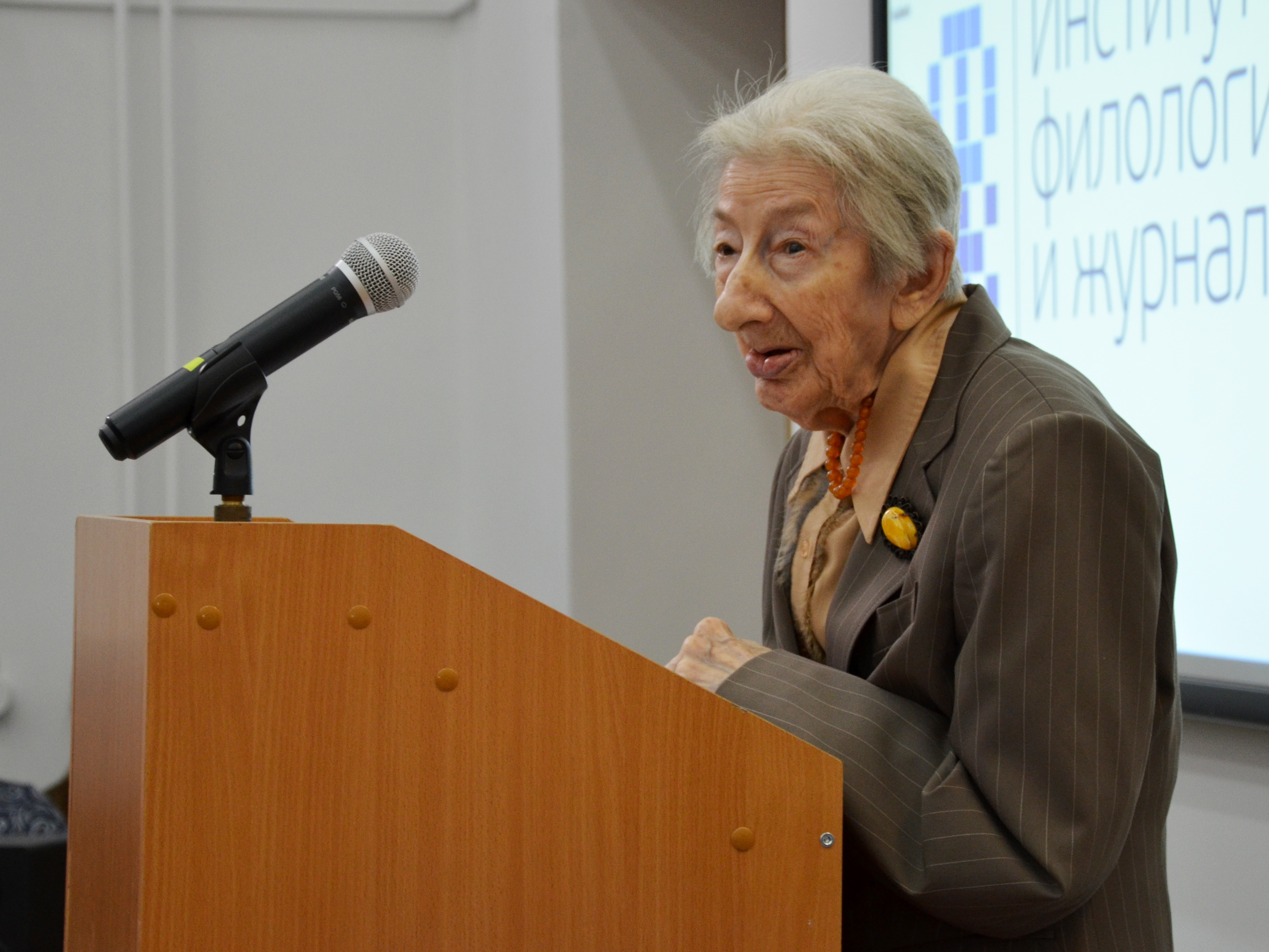
Sirotinina in 2019

Olga Borisovna Sirotinina (Russian: Ольга Борисовна Сиротинина; 27 June 1923 – 18 July 2025) was a Soviet and Russian linguist.

== Life and career ==
Sirotinina was born on 27 June 1923 in Saratov. She was the granddaughter of Saratov politician Nikolai Nikolayevich Sirotinin. In 1940 she entered the Faculty of Philology of Saratov University, which she graduated from in 1945.

She held several positions at the university following graduation, including senior lecturer at the Department of Slavic-Russian Linguistics. During 1973–1993 she was the head of the Department of the Russian Language, then the Head of the Department of Russian Language and Speech Communication. After 1993 she was a professor of the Department of Russian Language and Speech Communication.

She was awarded the Honored Scientist of the Russian Federation in 1999. In 2023 she was awarded the Russian Federation Presidential Certificate of Honour.

Sirotinina died on 18 July 2025, at the age of 102.
