= Levon Oganezov =

Russian musician and actor (1940–2025)

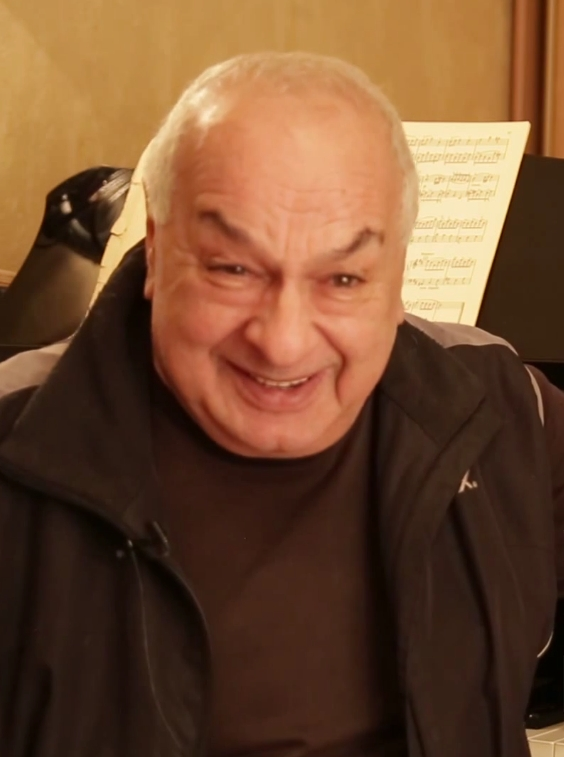
Oganezov in 2013

Levon Sarkisovich Oganezov (Russian: Лево́н Сарки́сович Оганезов; 25 December 1940 – 13 December 2025) was a Russian musician, composer and actor.

== Life and career ==
Oganezov was born in Moscow on 25 December 1940. His father, Sarkis Artemovich Oganezov, was a shoemaker, and his mother Mariam Sergeevna Oganezova (nee Karumova), was a housewife. He was the sixth child in the family; According to him, he was born because of the ban on abortion that came into force in 1936. He grew up in a Georgian speaking household, and also understood Armenian.

He began his stage career as a child, and according to family legend, one of the concerts where he performed as a child was attended by Joseph Stalin. He graduated from the Ippolitov-Ivanov Music College, then in 1967 from the Moscow Conservatory in piano class. At the age of 18, he replaced Naum Walter at a concert in the Column Hall, where he accompanied tenor Mikhail Alexandrovich.

He was a co-host of the television programs "White Parrot Club", "Fuss Around the Piano", "Good Evening with Igor Ugolnikov" (1997) and "Life is Beautiful".

On 18 March 1993, he was named an Honored Artist of the Russian Federation. On 25 December 2010, he was awarded the People's Artist of the Russian Federation.

Oganezov died in New York City on 13 December 2025, at the age of 84.
