= Bolshaya Rechka, Republic of Buryatia =

Bolshaya Rechka Большая Речка
- Selo
- Location within Republic of Buryatia Location within Russia
- Coordinates: 51°58′N 106°19′E
- Country: Russia
- Region: Republic of Buryatia
- District: Kabansky District
- Time zone: UTC+8:00

Bolshaya Rechka (Russian: Большая Речка) is a rural locality (a selo) in Kabansky District, Republic of Buryatia, Russia. The population was 494 as of 2010. There are 4 streets.

== Geography ==
Bolshaya Rechka is located 31 km (19 mi) southwest of Kabansk (the district's administrative centre) by road. Posolskaya is the nearest rural locality.
