= Evgeny Levitan =

Russian pianist (1943–2025)

Evgeny Levitan (Russian: Евге́ний Алекса́ндрович Левита́н; 9 December 1943 – 30 August 2025) was a Russian pianist.

== Life and career ==
Levitan was born in Leningrad on 9 December 1943, to a family of doctors. On his mother's side, he was the nephew of the poet Alexander Vvedensky. From 1973 he taught at the Ural State Mussorgsky Conservatory; For a number of years he was the head of the department of special piano. Since 2005 he had been the head of the Department of Special Piano of the Chelyabinsk State Academy of Culture and Arts.

He was the author of fundamental works on Stanislav Neuhaus and Bertha Maranz, and was the chairman and jury member of a number of piano competitions in Russia and abroad.

Levitan founded the Stanislav Neuhaus International Competition, which took place in April 2007 and November 2010 in Chelyabinsk under the chairmanship of Vladimir Krainev and Eliso Virsaladze. A third competition was held in November 2015.

Levitan died on 30 August 2025, at the age of 81.
