= 2025 Lesnoy factory explosion =

Explosion in Lesnoy, Russia

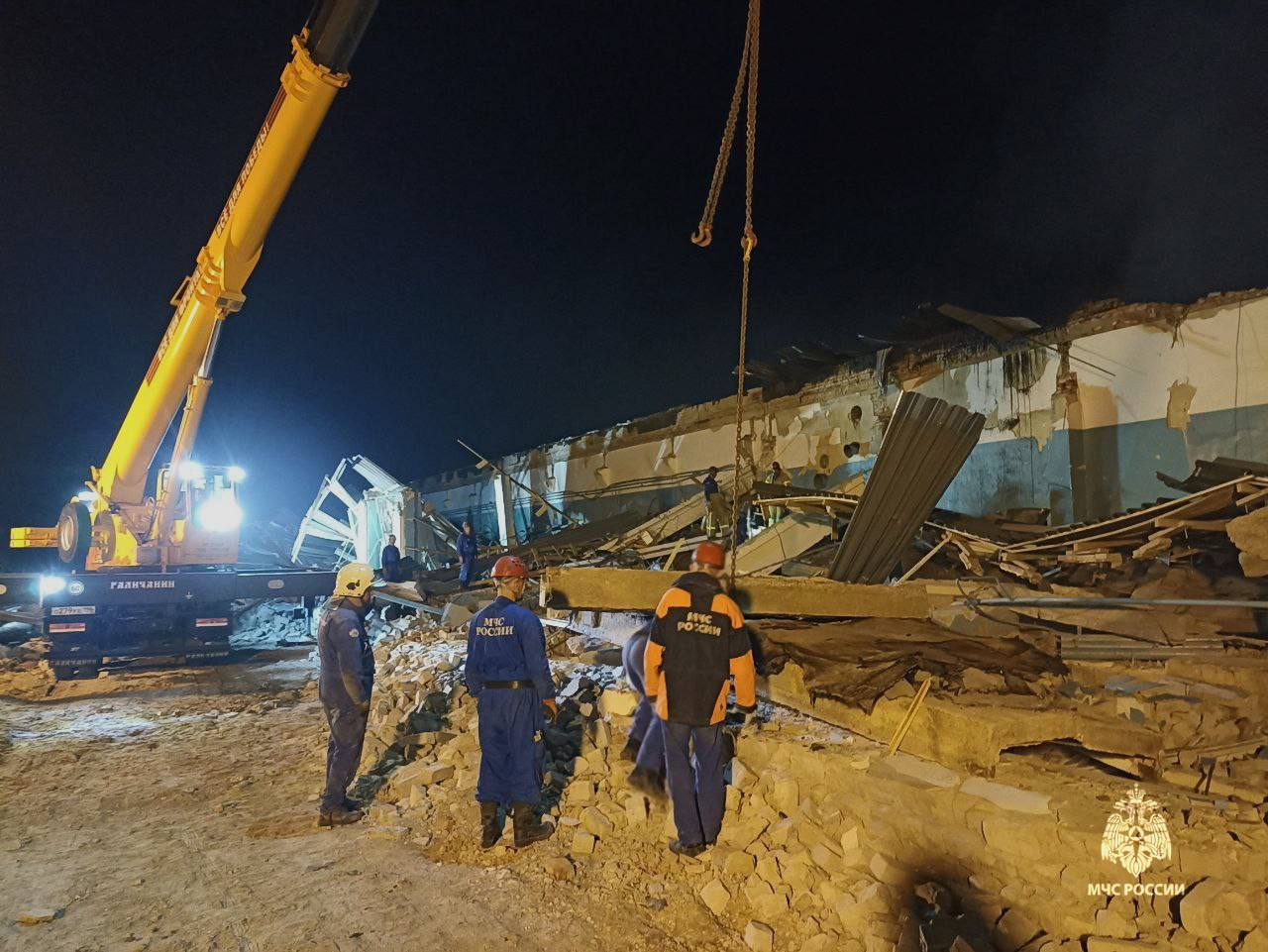
- Ministry of Emergency Situations employees at the scene
- Date: August 15, 2025
- Time: 10:41 (MSK)
- Venue: Elastik plant
- Location: Lesnoy, Shilovsky District, Ryazan Oblast, Russia
- Type: Explosion
- Cause: Fire inside a gunpowder workshop
- Deaths: 28
- Injuries: 157
- Property damage: Four buildings, over 300 tons of gunpowder and 600 shells destroyed

On August 15, 2025, an explosion and fire at the Elastik industrial plant in Shilovsky District, Ryazan Oblast, Russia, killed 28 people and injured 157 others.

== Background ==
The explosion occurred at the Elastik industrial plant. The Elastik plant began operations in 1962, and at the time, was essentially the town's main employer. They initially produced elastic and ammonite threads, and then created filling complexes for loading ammunition for various purposes, as well as bush-roller combine chains, drills, and cumulative charges. In 2015, the plant declared bankruptcy. Two years later, operations were completely suspended and employees were laid off in mass. In 2021, another explosion at the plant killed 17 people. The factory had received multiple warnings from authorities on labor safety previously.

== Fire and explosion ==
The fire initially started at 10:40 local time in the gunpowder workshop before spreading to three other buildings, including a warehouse containing shells loaded with TNT and a production facility. The explosion was reportedly caused by the detonation of a rogue shell. The buildings, along with over 300 tons of gunpowder and 600 shells, were destroyed in the accident. More than 360 people and 90 pieces of equipment were deployed to the scene. A state of emergency was declared.

== Victims ==
28 people were killed and 157 others were injured. Most of the fatalities were discovered during search and rescue operations. Of the injured, at least 17 were transported to specialized medical centers in Moscow.

== Investigation ==
According to preliminary data, the explosion was caused by a violation of industrial safety requirements. A technological failure may have occurred in one of the workshops, after which a detonation occurred. The Investigative Committee of Russia opened a criminal case under Article 217, Part 3 of the Criminal Code of the Russian Federation (violation of industrial safety requirements for hazardous production facilities, resulting through negligence in the death of two or more persons).

== Reactions ==
Governor of Ryazan Oblast Pavel Malkov stated that the families of the deceased will be paid more than 1.5 million rubles, and the injured will receive from 313,500 to 627,000 rubles, depending on the damage caused to health.

A national day of mourning was declared on August 18.

== See also ==
- 2025 Plastmass Factory explosion
