= Irina Zorina =

Russian historian, writer and translator (1938–2025)

Irina Nikolaevna Zorina (Russian: Ири́на Никола́евна Зо́рина; 7 July 1938 – 29 August 2025) was a Russian historian, writer and translator.

== Life and work ==
Zorina was born in the family of a hydraulic engineer, Honored Land Reclamator of the RSFSR Nikolai Afanasievich Zorin (1904–1969), during her father's business trip to Perm. The next year, the family returned to Moscow, where Irina graduated from school (1955) and before attending the history faculty of Moscow State University (1960), specializing in modern and contemporary history. From 1960 to 1993, she worked at IMEMO in the Division for Developing Countries. In 1963–1964, she worked in Cuba for "almost a year" as a translator with Soviet specialists. From the summer of 1964, she worked for a year and a half in the journal "Problems of Peace and Socialism" (Prague). In 1966, she returned to Moscow and resumed her postgraduate studies at the Institute of World Economy and International Relations.

In 1968, she defended her dissertation "The Christian Democratic Party of Chile: Ideology and Politics". In 1971, she published her first book "Revolution or Reform in Latin America. A Critique of the Reformism of Chilean Christian Democracy."

In 2020, her book of memoirs "Swaddling Memory" was published.

Zorina died in Moscow on 29 August 2025, at the age of 87.
