= Stanislav Tarasov =

Russian political scientist (1953–2025)

Stanislav Nikolayevich Tarasov (Russian: Станислав Николаевич Тарасов; 1953 – 29 August 2025) was a Russian political scientist.

== Life and work ==
Tarasov was born in Azerbaijan in 1953. He graduated from the Faculty of History of the Azerbaijan University and postgraduate studies at the Moscow State University.

In 1978–1991, he worked in the Turkish editorial office of the USSR State Television and Radio in the Middle East, special correspondent and commentator of the Main Editorial Office of International Life of the Central Television of the USSR State Television and Radio. In 2004–2006, he was editor-in-chief of the international affairs department of the weekly newspaper Vek. Since 2007, he had been the editor-in-chief of the weekly newspaper Rossiiskiye Vesti.

Tarasov died of lung cancer on 29 August 2025, at the age of 72.
