= Mikhail Malyshev =

Russian cannibal, murderer and possible serial killer (1965–2025)

- Михаил Малышев
- Born: Mikhail Yuryevich Malyshev; 31 October 1965; Perm, Perm Oblast, Russian SFSR, USSR (present-day Perm Krai, Russia)
- Died: 19 December 2025 (aged 60); Perm, Russia
- Other name: "The Perm Cannibal"
- Convictions: Murder x2 Rape x2 False imprisonment x2 Cannibalism x2 Animal cruelty
- Penalty: 25 years imprisonment, with two years time served

Details
- Victims: 2–8
- Span of crimes: 1997–1998
- Country: Russia
- State: Perm
- Date apprehended: 1998

Mikhail Yuryevich Malyshev (Russian: Михаил Юрьевич Малышев; 31 October 1965 – 19 December 2025), known as the Perm Cannibal (Russian: Пермский людоед), was a Russian murderer, cannibal and possible serial killer who was convicted of murdering, dismembering and eating the remains of two acquaintances in the city of Perm between 1997 and 1998. He was also suspected of six similar murders for which he was never charged. Malyshev was sentenced to 25 years' imprisonment but was released in 2022, and later lived in Perm.

== Early life ==
Mikhail Yuryevich Malyshev was born on 31 October 1965, in the city of Perm, which was then the administrative centre of Perm Oblast in the Russian SFSR (now the Russian federal subject of Perm Krai). Malyshev was raised in an affluent and well-respected family; some sources claim that his mother worked as a schoolteacher, while others say that she worked as a high-ranking engineer at a nuclear power plant. As a child, Malyshev attended violin classes but was forced to abandon this pursuit after sustaining an injury to his arm.

Following his parents' divorce in the late 1970s, Malyshev's mother remarried and had a daughter with her new husband in 1983. The divorce greatly affected Malyshev emotionally and mentally, further distancing him from peers who had already bullied him for being overweight. This led to Malyshev being highly stressed and frequently angry, often resorting to killing stray cats and dogs to vent his frustrations. In 1980, Malyshev was arrested on charges of cruelty against animals and interned at a juvenile detention centre, where he started exercising and attended boxing classes.

In order to effectively build muscle mass, Malyshev decided that he would need to eat more meat; as there was a shortage of meat products, he resorted to eating dog meat. Malyshev changed high schools three times before enrolling at a vocational school, and upon graduation in 1984, he was drafted into the Soviet Army. After completing his service, Malyshev returned to his mother's home, whereupon he became even more aggressive and began to show signs of mental illness. Due to his frequent outbursts, his mother and stepfather accused him of being anti-social and forbade him from contacting his younger sister.

=== Marshal Rybalko Street apartment ===
In 1986, Malyshev's mother exchanged the family's current one-room apartment for two separate apartments, one of which was located on Marshal Rybalko Street in the Zakamsk District of Perm. Malyshev eventually moved into this apartment, where he lived for the following years and where all of his murders ultimately occurred.

It is unclear what professions Malyshev held during this period – one source claims that he worked at the "Sorbent" nuclear plant, while others claim that he worked as a welder or carpenter. He led a secluded life and was never married. Malyshev was fond of reading and weightlifting, but despite this, he held a reputation as an anti-social man who enjoyed killing stray dogs.

In the mid-1990s, Malyshev quit his job due to delayed wage payments. To avoid the economic hardship common in post-Soviet Russia at the time, he began to produce and sell moonshine on the streets, as well as hats made from the skins of dogs he had killed. In 1995, Malyshev met an eighteen-year-old mentally-ill orphan named Nikolai, whom he allowed to stay in his apartment; not long after, he began physically and sexually abusing the youth. As payment for the housing, Nikolai was ordered to bring stray dogs back to the apartment, which he and Malyshev would later kill and eat. At around this time, Malyshev resorted to drinking large quantities of alcohol.

=== Growing paranoia ===
In mid-1996, Malyshev met a nineteen-year-old nurse named Inna Borovik, with whom he soon began a romantic relationship. He soon introduced her to his mother and eventually met her father, who was also an alcoholic. A few months later, Borovik moved into Malyshev's apartment, where she soon found herself imprisoned. Malyshev would torture, rape and abuse both her and Nikolai, and would go so far as to force them to have sex with one another while he watched.

During this period, Malyshev's mental state began to rapidly decline, and he started experiencing paranoid delusions. He eventually installed a metal door inside his apartment with several locks and peepholes to monitor the stairwell, as well as steel bars and blinds on the apartment's windows, crafted from horizontal plates of thick metal steel. In order to prevent theft, Malyshev also placed several pieces of furniture, including his television set, in steel cages that he kept locked up.

Malyshev understood that Borovik suffered from low self-esteem and depression, and in order to keep her under his control he forbade her to go outside without him, in addition to intimidating and humiliating her regularly. During one particular beating, Malyshev took a knife and cut off one of Nikolai's ears in front of Borovik, thus completely crushing her will to resist.

As he spent most of his time on the streets, Malyshev often befriended various marginalized people whom he would invite back to his apartment to drink alcohol and eat pies and pelmeni made from dog meat. As a consequence of his alcoholism, his behaviour became even more unstable, with him developing an obsession with collecting items. In the span of a few years, his apartment was turned into a run-down brothel where most of the rooms were filled with various garbage, random items and animal carcasses that were stacked onto one another. In the kitchen Malyshev would attach hooks to the walls to hang said carcasses, and would usually dismember animal remains on a cutting board using various carving knives.

== Murders ==
=== Natalia Suvorova ===
Malyshev's first known murder victim was sixteen-year-old Natalia Suvorova, a student at a Perm vocational school. At the end of 1997, Malyshev let Borovik out of his apartment so she could bring back a girl to satisfy his sexual urges. After meeting Suvorova on the streets, Borovik persuaded her to come back to the apartment to purportedly drink alcohol together. According to Borovik's later testimony, after Suvorova became intoxicated, Malyshev and several friends (including a supposed police officer) proceeded to sexually abuse the girl for several hours. This version of events was deemed to be faulty by Lt. Gulnara Abibulaeva, a retired Lieutenant Colonel of Justice and former senior investigator of the local prosecutor's office, who ascertained that aside from Malyshev, Borovik and Nikolai, there was nobody else inside the apartment.

After Malyshev stopped abusing the girl, Suvorova threatened to call the police. Upon hearing this, Malyshev grabbed an axe and bludgeoned her to death. With Borovik and Nikolai's help, he then dismembered her body and made minced meat out of her flesh, with which he later used to prepare pelmeni and cutlets. During the dismemberment, Borovik suffered a nervous breakdown, after which Malyshev beat both her and Nikolai, threatening to kill them as well if they did not cooperate. In a bid to intimidate them, Malyshev bit off the tip of Borovik's nose and ate it in front of them. He then put Suvorova's hands, feet and head in a bag, which he then threw into the Kama river. The girl's remains were soon found, but another resident of Perm was wrongfully arrested and coerced into confessing by authorities. Malyshev was reportedly not considered a suspect in her murder at the time.

=== Anton ===
Malyshev committed his second known murder in 1998, with this victim being an acquaintance named "Anton." On the day of the murder, Malyshev invited Anton to spend the night in his apartment to drink alcohol. The pair drank until the late hours, when Borovik attempted to throw Anton out. Unwilling to leave, an argument arose between Anton and his hosts, upon which Malyshev grabbed an axe and bludgeoned him to death. He then dismembered the remains and ate the victim's heart. However, Malyshev made no serious effort to cover his tracks, throwing Anton's remains behind a garage lot near his apartment building, where they were soon found by a passerby.

After identifying the victim, police questioned Anton's brother, who stated that Anton had gone to visit an acquaintance named Mikhail Malyshev for a barbecue. As Malyshev was already notorious for killing animals, he was immediately considered the prime suspect. A few weeks after the murder, police officers were sent to the apartment. During the subsequent search, they found packages containing human remains, as well as over 600 kilograms of meat of unknown origin, after which Malyshev was immediately arrested.

== Arrest and confessions ==
Shortly after his arrest, Borovik and Nikolai agreed to testify against Malyshev. During the first day of interrogations, Malyshev denied any and all responsibility for the killings, but eventually cracked under pressure from the abundance of physical evidence and confessed to killing Suvorova and Anton. In his confessions, Malyshev claimed that he committed both killings in a state of both anger and drunkenness brought upon him due to his heavy consumption of vodka.

As he continued his confession, Malyshev explained that he believed dog meat had medicinal qualities and a high protein intake that he needed to build up his muscle mass. He attributed his urge to cannibalize his victims to curiosity, as he had no idea what human meat tasted like, pointing out that various tribes in Africa also reportedly ate human flesh. Later on, however, he refused to cooperate and threatened physical violence against Lt. Abibulaeva, claiming that "if [he] had a hammer right now, he would smash all [her] fingers".

Malyshev's roommates were also prosecuted. Borovik was charged with aiding and abetting in the commission of a crime but was ultimately given a suspended sentence and released. During interrogations, she claimed that she was afraid of Malyshev, who threatened that he would throw her in the freezer if she attempted to run away from him. Due to her constant state of stress, Borovik had a hormonal breakdown and was unable to have her period for six months. It's unclear what happened to Nikolai after his arrest.

== Prosecution ==
A psychiatric evaluation determined that Malyshev was fit to stand trial, despite the fact that he did indeed suffer from some mental abnormalities. During the investigation, he was ordered to take a polygraph test, the results of which were inconclusive. While searching through Malyshev's apartment, investigators found several articles of clothing that did not belong to him, which they believed were from possible additional victims. Malyshev failed to answer several questions during questioning, and when asked if he was involved in at least six similar murders committed in Perm in recent years, he refused to acknowledge whether he was involved or not.

At the request of the prosecutor's office, the 600 kilograms of meat were sent to a laboratory in order to determine what kind of meat it was. Samples were taken from various packages, and results showed that a majority of it was dog meat. However, law enforcement officials later stated that they were unable to completely verify that all 600 kilograms were dog meat due to a lack of resources.

In the end, no evidence implicating Malyshev in other murders ever surfaced, and since results from polygraph tests could not be admitted as evidence, he was only charged with the murders of Suvorova and Anton. The trial was held behind closed doors at Perm Regional Court, and due to this much of the process and materials related to the case were never released to the public. In 2000, Malyshev was found guilty on all charges and sentenced to 25 years' imprisonment, with two of these years counting as time served due to the fact he was immediately detained at a penal colony after his arrest.

== Imprisonment and release ==
After his conviction, Malyshev was transferred to the high-security penal colony No. 10 in Chusovoy. At the said colony, he was placed in a 200-bed unit and worked as a food handler, a prestigious position that allowed him unlimited access to food. As a result, Malyshev quickly gained weight, and while he participated in boxing competitions, he did not achieve any outstanding results.

Throughout his time in prison, Malyshev was treated as an outcast by other inmates, but was otherwise not bullied in any way and left to his own devices. In 2005, journalists visited him for an interview, during which he claimed that he was remorseful and currently attempting to better himself physically and spiritually. As he was not popular with the prison staff, Malyshev was constantly disciplined for being unkempt and keeping spoiled food in his cell, due to which his mental health deteriorated sharply and he contracted a number of neurological diseases, even developing a stutter. Malyshev only communicated with a few inmates and his mother, and after spending more than a decade in prison, he developed a meeker personality and would often cry while being scolded by prison guards.

In 2016, Malyshev began receiving a pension for his previous work in hazardous conditions. Due to this and his job as a food handler, he earned a reputation as one of the most financially secure convicts in the country. Despite this, Malyshev began to experience health issues, and due to being overweight he was diagnosed with a number of cardiovascular and musculoskeletal diseases which caused him to walk with a limp.

=== Release from prison and death ===
In early 2022, several of Malyshev's acquaintances claimed that he had become institutionalized and supposedly would confess to additional murders so he could receive a new sentence and be kept in prison, but this never occurred. After serving 23 years in prison, Malyshev was released in October 2022 and returned to his apartment on Marshal Rybalko Street. His release caused great outrage from the public, thanks to which his life and crimes received renewed attention from the Russian media.

After returning to Perm, Malyshev refused to talk to journalists and avoided publicity. His release caused a moral panic among some residents, leading to allegations that residents of his apartment building were collecting signatures to have him evicted since there was a school and a kindergarten near the building; however, these claims remain unconfirmed. Law enforcement officials stated that there was no legal basis to evict Malyshev since he was the registered owner of the apartment, had served his sentence in full and regularly reported his status to the local police.

Malyshev died in Perm on 19 December 2025, at the age of 60.

== In media and culture ==
Malyshev's crimes were covered on an episode of Frank Confessions (Russian: Чистосердечное признание) in 2005.

== See also ==
- List of incidents of cannibalism
- Abolish and hang cannibalism
