= Evgeny Krasavin =

Russian scientist (1942–2025)

Krasavin c. 2018

Evgeny Alexandrovich Krasavin (Russian: Евгений Александрович Красавин; 20 April 1942 – 17 July 2025) was a Russian scientist.

== Life and career ==
Krasavin was born in Dubna, Moscow Oblast on 20 April 1942.

From 1971 to 1980, he was a researcher at the Institute of Biomedical Problems M3 of the USSR. From 1980 to 1995, he worked at the Dzhelepov Laboratory of Nuclear Problems of the Joint Institute for Nuclear Research. Krasavin obtained a doctorate in Biological Sciences in 1985, and in 1989 he was made a professor at the State University of Dubna. In 1986, he became head of the Biological Research Sector at the JINR, and presided over the Biophysics Department which he created in 1988, In 1995, Krasavin was made head of the Radiation and Radiobiological Research Department at JINR.

In 1996 he was awarded the Medal of the Order of Merit for the Fatherland.

Krasavin died on 17 July 2025, at the age of 83.
