= Ruggero Gilyarevsky =

Russian philologist (1929–2025)

Ruggero Gilyarevsky (Russian: Рудже́ро Серге́евич Гиляре́вский; 31 August 1929 – 22 August 2025) was a Russian philologist.

== Life and work ==
Gilyarevsky was born in Moscow on 31 August 1929, to Ettore Macchi, captain of the military attaché of the Italian embassy in Moscow, and Ekaterina Vladimirovna Krylaeva, ballerina at the Kazan Opera House.

In 1947-1948, Gilyarevsky studied at the Moscow Power Engineering Institute at the Faculty of Electric Vacuum Industry, then at the Lomonosov Moscow State University at the Spanish Department of the Faculty of Philology, from which he graduated in 1953; with the thesis "Aesthetic principles of Lope de Vega".

In 1958, he defended his Ph.D. thesis "Description of Books in Foreign Languages for Catalogs of Soviet Libraries", and in 1989 - his doctoral dissertation on the topic "General Patterns in the Development of Disciplines of Scientific Information and Communication".

Gilyarevsky died on 22 August 2025, at the age of 95.
