= Igor Palmin =

Russian photographer (1933–2025)

- Игорь Анатольевич Пальмин
- Born: 7 January 1933; Stalingrad, Russian SFSR, USSR
- Died: 2 November 2025 (aged 92)
- Occupations: Photographer, journalist
- Awards: State Prize of the Russian Federation (2003)

Igor Anatolyevich Palmin (Russian: Игорь Анатольевич Пальмин; 7 January 1933 – 2 November 2025) was a Russian photographer and journalist.

== Life and career ==
Palmin was born in Stalingrad on 7 January 1933. He is primarily known for his publications on Art Nouveau architecture. In 2003, he was awarded the State Prize of the Russian Federation.

== Death ==
Palmin died on 2 November 2025, at the age of 92.
