= Erkhirik =

Erkhirik Эрхирик
- Selo
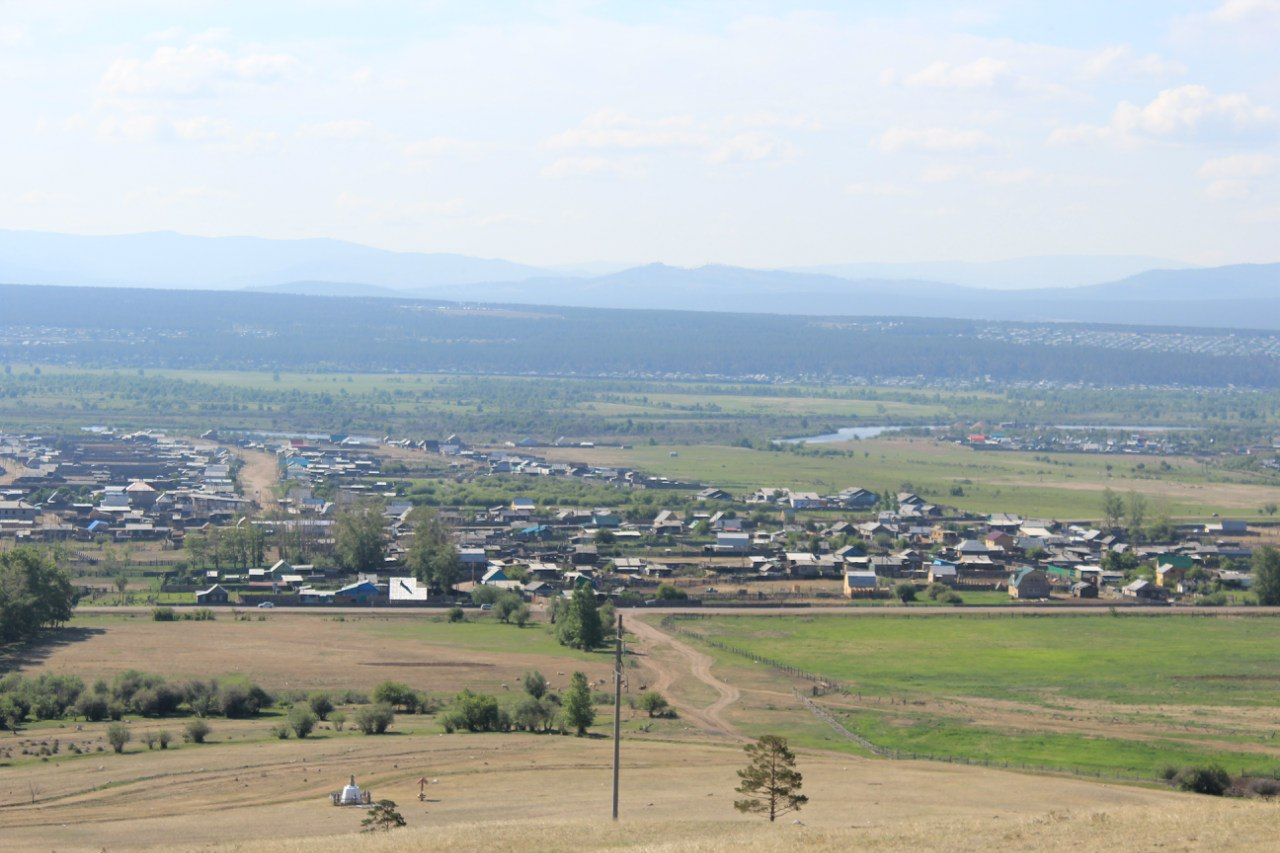
- View of Erkhirik

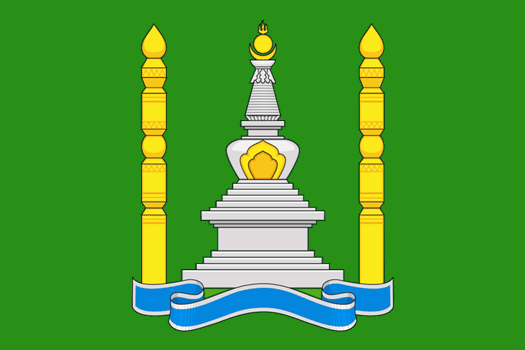
- Flag

- Location within Republic of Buryatia Location within Russia
- Coordinates: 51°53′N 107°49′E
- Country: Russia
- Region: Republic of Buryatia
- District: Zaigrayevsky District
- Time zone: UTC+8:00

Erkhirik (Russian: Эрхирик; Buryat: Эрхэрэг, Erkhereg) is a rural locality (a selo) in Zaigrayevsky District, Republic of Buryatia, Russia. The population was 2,261 as of 2010. There are 63 streets.

== Geography ==
Erkhirik is located 42 km northwest of Zaigrayevo (the district's administrative centre) by road. Dabata is the nearest rural locality.
