= Filipp Naumenko =

Russian politician (1985–2025)

- Филипп Науменко
- Filipp Naumenko in 2024

Mayor of Reutov
- In office 8 December 2023 – 13 December 2025; Acting until 1 February 2024
- Governor: Andrey Vorobyov
- Preceded by: Stanislav Katorov
- Succeeded by: Alexei Kovyazin (acting)

Personal details
- Born: 28 December 1985 Moscow, Russian SFSR, USSR
- Died: 13 December 2025 (aged 39) Moscow, Russia
- Party: United Russia
- Education: Moscow Power Engineering Institute; RANEPA
- Occupation: Financier; Jurist; Politician

Filipp Anatolyevich Naumenko (Russian: Фили́пп Анато́льевич Нау́менко; 28 December 1985 – 13 December 2025) was a Russian politician who served as the mayor of Reutov from December 2023 until his death in traffic collision in December 2025.

== Early life and career ==
Naumenko was born in Moscow on 28 December 1985. He played football including at FC Prialit Reutov. In 2007 he graduated from the Moscow Power Engineering Institute (Faculty of Finance and Credit), and in 2012 — from the RANEPA (Faculty of Law).

From April 2007 to September 2014, he was an adviser in the Moscow Oblast Duma. In 2014, he was elected from the multi-member constituency No 3 to the Council of Deputies of the Balashikha urban district. Since March 2017, he worked as deputy head of the administration of the Balashikha urban district. Since December 2023, he had been appointed acting mayor of the Reutov urban district, the inauguration ceremony took place on 1 February 2024.

== Death ==
On 7 December 2025, Naumenko was involved in a traffic collision in Nizhny Novgorod Oblast, he was seriously injured and hospitalized in the intensive care unit in Moscow. Naumenko died six days later, on 13 December, at the age of 39.
