= Kazan State University of Culture and Arts =

- Казанский государственный институт культуры
- Established: 1969
- Rector: Roza Akhmadieva
- Location: Kazan, Russia; 55°45′43.2″N 49°9′10.1″E

Kazan State University of Culture and Arts (KazSUCA) is located in Kazan, Tatarstan, Russia. It was founded in 1969 as a branch of the Saint Petersburg State Institute of Culture. It became the Kazan State Institute for Culture in 1974 and was named the Kazan State Institute for Culture and Arts in 1991. It acquired the status of an academy in 1995. On July 4, 2002, it acquired university status and became the Kazan State University of Culture and Arts.

== Personnel ==
The founder of Kazan State University of Culture and Arts is the Ministry of Culture of the Russian Federation. The rector of the university is Rivkat Youssoupov.

KazSUCA is represented by more than 300 teachers, including 32 professors, 107 senior lecturers, and 148 Doctors of Science. About 70 professors and lecturers of the university have honorary titles from the Tatarstan Republic and the Russian Federation, among them are winners of state awards from the Tatarstan Republic and the Russian Federation.

Kazan State University of Culture and Arts has about 3000 students (who study in a full-time and correspondence faculties), 9 Faculties, and 30 Departments. KazSUKA fulfills 25 licensed programs of bachelors, 3 programs of masters, and 5 programs of experts.

== International activity ==
There are agreements in place to enhance the university's cooperation in the fields of education, science, and culture, and recreational development with 23 state academies and universities in other countries, including: Belarus, Kazakhstan, South Africa, Iran, Tajikistan, Hungary, Kyrgyzstan, and Azerbaijan.

== Advancements in human rights education ==
In April 2011, a branch of UNESCO's Special Department of Human Rights and Democracy was established at the Moscow State Institute of International Relations (MGIMO), under the Ministry of Foreign Affairs of the Russian Federation, pursuant to an agreement with UNESCO.
