= Perm National Research Polytechnic University =

University in Perm, Russia

- Пермский Национальный Исследовательский Политехнический Университет
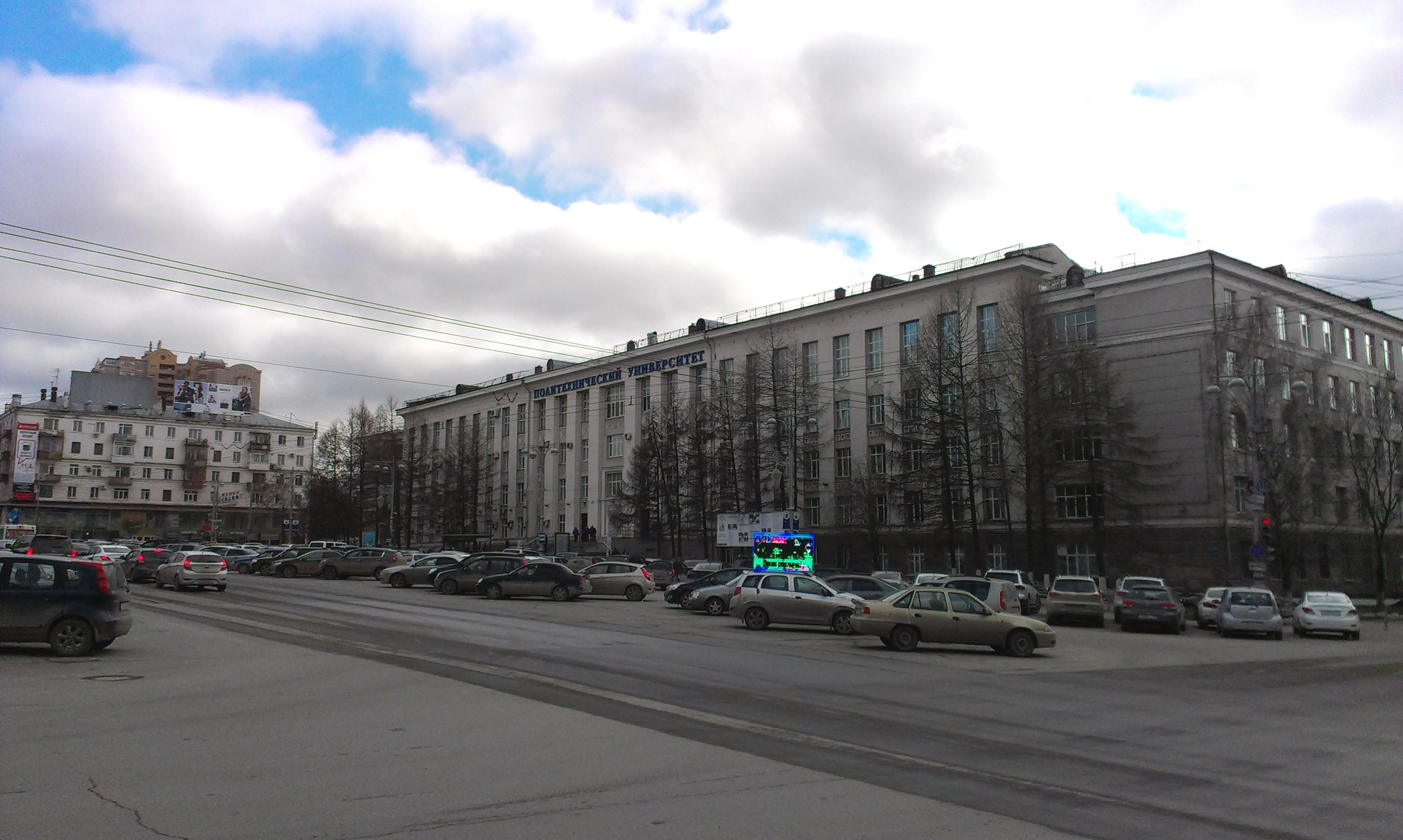
- Type: Public
- Established: 1953
- Rector: Anatoly Tashkinov
- Location: Komsomolsky prospect, 29, Perm, Russia; 58°00′29″N 56°14′25″E
- Website: http://pstu.ru/

University rankings

Regional – Overall
- QS Emerging Europe and Central Asia: 200 (2022)

Perm National Research Polytechnic University (PNRPU; Russian: Пермский Национальный Исследовательский Политехнический Университет) is a multidisciplinary higher educational institution that provides training for scientific, technical, technological, economic, managerial, social and humanitarian areas and specialties for enterprises and organizations of the Western Ural and Russia. The university is located in the city of Perm, Perm Krai, Russia. Its rector is Anatoly Таshkinov.
