= Verkhnyaya Khava =

Rural locality in Voronezh Oblast, Russia

Coordinates: 51°50′38″N 39°56′01″E

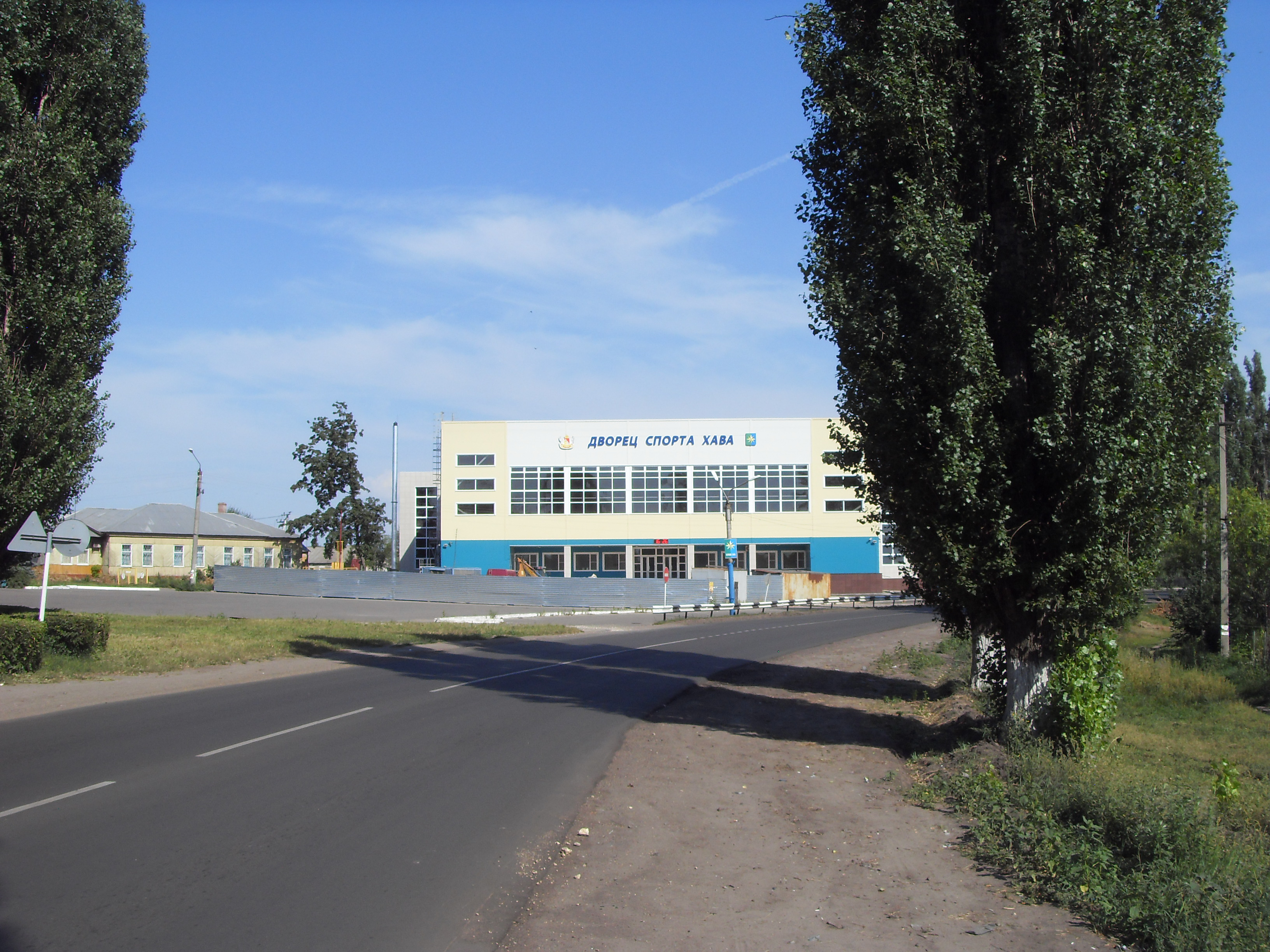
Street of Verkhnyaya Khava

Verkhnyaya Khava (Russian: Ве́рхняя Ха́ва) is a rural locality (a selo) and the administrative center of Verkhnekhavsky District of Voronezh Oblast, Russia. Population: 7,344 (2021 census); 8,154 (2010 census); 7,980 (2002 census); 8,937 (1989 Soviet census).
