= Verkhnekhavsky District =

Verkhnekhavsky District Верхнехавский район (Russian)
- District
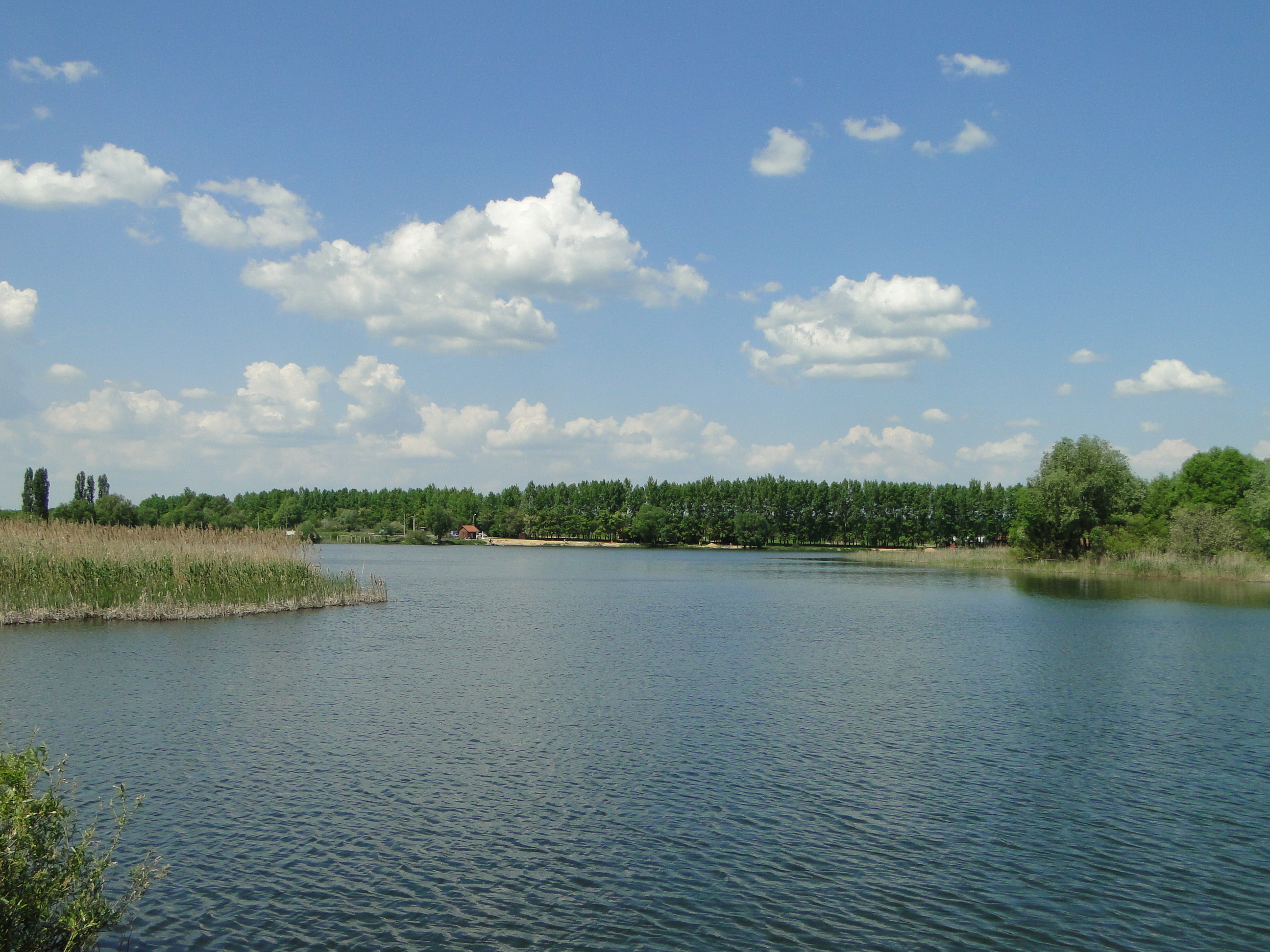
- Laptevsky Pond, Verkhnekhavsky District

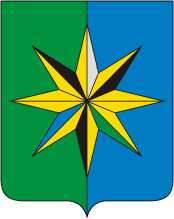
- Flag Coat of arms
- Location of Verkhnekhavsky District in Voronezh Oblast
- Coordinates: 51°50′20″N 39°56′30″E
- Country: Russia
- Federal subject: Voronezh Oblast
- Established: 1928
- Administrative center: Verkhnyaya Khava

Area
  - Total: 1,253 km^{2} (484 sq mi)

Population (2010 Census)
  - Total: 25,156
  - Density: 20.08/km^{2} (52.00/sq mi)
  - Urban: 0%
  - Rural: 100%

Administrative structure
  - Administrative divisions: 17 Rural settlements
  - Inhabited localities: 65 rural localities

Municipal structure
  - Municipally incorporated as: Verkhnekhavsky Municipal District
  - Municipal divisions: 0 urban settlements, 17 rural settlements
- Time zone: UTC+3 (MSK)
- OKTMO ID: 20611000
- Website: http://www.vhava.ru/

Verkhnekhavsky District (Russian: Верхнеха́вский райо́н) is an administrative and municipal district (raion), one of the thirty-two in Voronezh Oblast, Russia. It is located in the north of the oblast. The area of the district is 1,253 square kilometers (484 sq mi). Its administrative center is the rural locality (a selo) of Verkhnyaya Khava. Population: 23,058 (2021 census); 25,156 (2010 census); 26,656 (2002 census); 30,896 (1989 Soviet census). The population of Verkhnyaya Khava accounts for 31.9% of the district's total population.
