= 2025 in Ireland =

- Centuries: 19th; 20th; 21st
- Decades: 2000s; 2010s; 2020s
- See also: 2025 in Northern Ireland; Other events of 2025; List of years in Ireland

Events during the year 2025 in Ireland.

== Incumbents ==
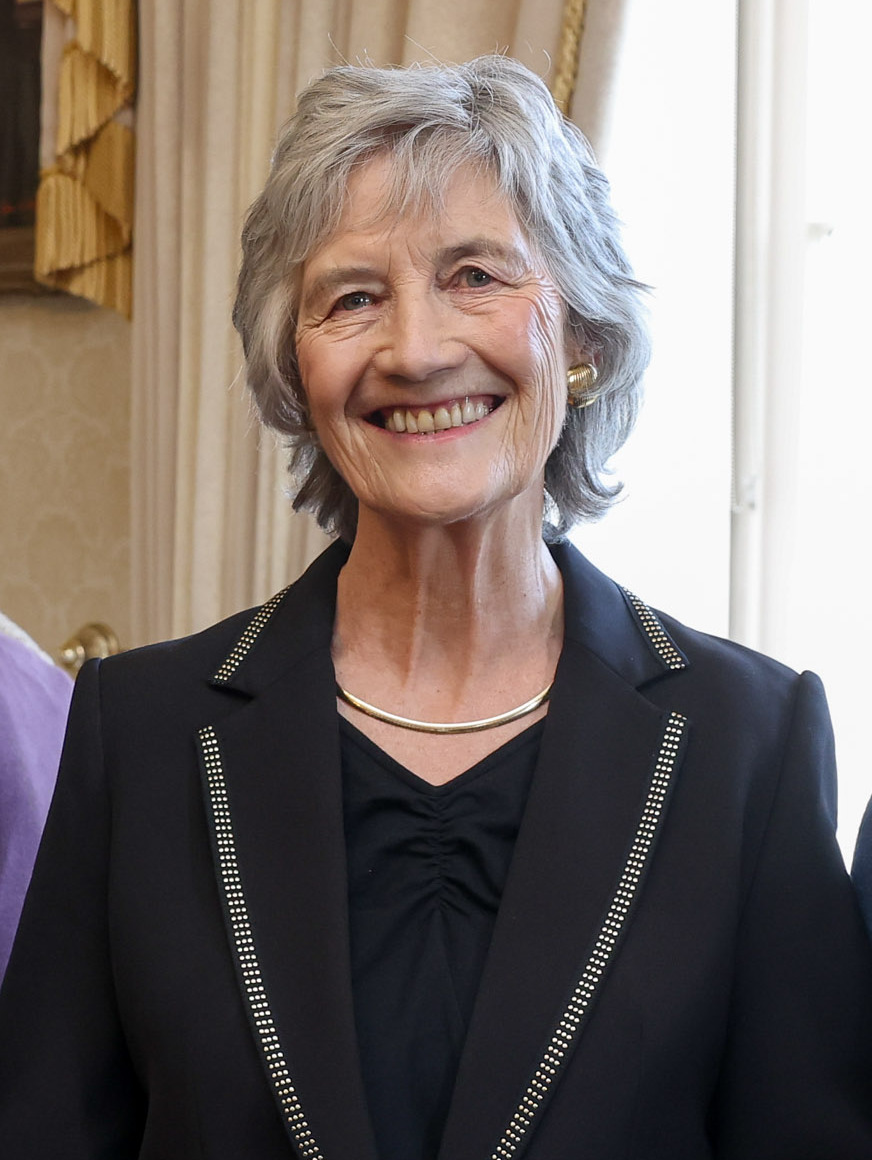
President Catherine Connolly

- President:
  - Michael D. Higgins (until 10 November 2025)
  - Catherine Connolly (from 11 November 2025)
- Taoiseach:
  - Simon Harris (FG) (until 23 January 2025)
  - Micheál Martin (FF) (from 23 January 2025)
- Tánaiste:
  - Micheál Martin (FF) (until 23 January 2025)
  - Simon Harris (FG) (from 23 January 2025)
- Minister for Finance:
  - Jack Chambers (FF) (until 23 January 2025)
  - Paschal Donohoe (FG) (from 23 January 2025 until 18 November 2025)
  - Simon Harris (FG) (from 18 November 2025)
- Chief Justice: Donal O'Donnell
- Dáil Éireann: 34th
- Seanad Éireann:
  - 26th (until 30 January 2025)
  - 27th (from 12 February 2025)

== Events ==
=== January ===
- 1 January
  - The 2025 Seanad election (for university members) was in progress (which began 30 December 2024).
  - The minimum wage rose to €13.50 per hour. The Irish minimum wage was introduced in April 2000.
- 4 January – The United States president Joe Biden presented the Irish singer Bono with the Presidential Medal of Freedom for his activism against AIDS and poverty.
- 8 January – The annual Art O'Neill Challenge endurance race, due to take place on 10 January from Dublin Castle, was postponed due to unsafe conditions along the route caused by an extreme cold weather and snow event affecting Ireland and Britain.
- 9 January – A provisional temperature record of −8.2 °C was recorded in County Longford as a cold snap continued with a Status Orange weather warning issued by Met Éireann.
- 10 January – Three sisters aged 12, 15, and 17 from Presentation Secondary School, Tralee were announced as the winners of the Young Scientist Exhibition for their project "Aid Care Treat", a medical assistance application designed to support emergency healthcare response.
- 15 January
  - A programme for government was published by a coalition of the Fianna Fáil and Fine Gael parties, together with Independent politicians, all recently elected at the general election in November. Micheál Martin of Fianna Fáil was proposed as the new taoiseach (prime minister) until November 2027, when Simon Harris of Fine Gael (currently the acting taoiseach) would replace him.
  - Seanad election ballot papers – for panel members – were issued.
- 16 January
  - Passenger and freight sea ferry sailings between Dublin Port and the Port of Holyhead in Wales resumed after over a month's interruption. Storm Darragh in December damaged the Welsh port.
  - Ireland and Northern Ireland announced restrictions on animal imports from Germany following an outbreak of foot-and-mouth disease.
- 22 January – Dáil Éireann returned after the Christmas break.
- 23 January
  - The Dáil elected the leader of the Fianna Fáil party, Micheál Martin, as the new taoiseach. Martin named his new Cabinet then went to Áras an Uachtaráin to receive his seal of office from President Higgins. The Dáil adjourned until 5 February.
  - Met Éireann issued a Status Red wind warning for the entire country. All education and childcare services were closed and public transport was suspended.
- 24 January – Ireland's worst storm since 1961, Storm Éowyn, left 768,000 homes, farms and businesses without power, and brought record-breaking gusts of 183 km/h. A man died in County Donegal after a tree fell on his car, while the Connacht GAA Air Dome was destroyed. Galway's former champion hurler Michael Coleman died near his home in February while dealing with the storm's aftermath.
- 25 January – Thousands of people marched in a National Demonstration for Palestine in Dublin that was organised by the Ireland Palestine Solidarity Campaign (IPSC) together with more than 150 civil society groups. The IPSC called for Israel to stop its attacks on the West Bank and for the enactment of the Occupied Territories Bill.
- 26 January – Phase 6a of the BusConnects transport infrastructure programme finished completion in Dublin, having been launched in September 2024. The 46a bus route made its last journey.
- 29 January – The Seanad election poll for university members closed.
- 30 January – The Seanad election poll for panel members closed.

=== February ===
- 3 February – The Ceann Comhairle in Dáil Éireann, Verona Murphy, ruled that the Regional Technical Group of independent teachtaí dála (TDs) may not form a Dáil technical group to acquire additional speaking rights. She said, "I have decided that the Group are not eligible for recognition under Standing Order 170. I therefore cannot accord recognition as a technical group to the Regional Technical Group." Opposition politicians welcomed the development including Social Democrat Cian O'Callaghan who said, "Government backbenchers cannot masquerade as members of the opposition in a cynical attempt to avail of opposition speaking rights."
- 5 February – The postal service An Post announced that the price of a domestic postage stamp will increase for the third time in two years. The cost will increase by 25 cents to €1.65, on 27 February for personal customers, and on 1 March for businesses. The price of an international letter stamp will rise from €2.20 to €2.65. The number of letters being posted has declined by half in the past decade. Businesses and government now send 93 percent of post, with just seven percent being sent by the general public.
- 9 February – Three men, aged in their mid-20s to mid-40s, were injured following a stabbing incident in Stoneybatter, Dublin. The alleged attacker, a man in his late 20s, was arrested near the scene of the incident.
- 11 February – BT Ireland announced it would withdraw as organiser and sponsor of the Young Scientist Exhibition after 25 years.
- 12 February – ESB Networks, Ireland's state owned electricity company, confirmed that it had restored electricity to all customers across the nation whose power had been cut during Storm Éowyn. The last of those to be reconnected had been without electricity for almost three weeks.
- 14 February – In Goa, India, Vikat Bhagat was convicted of the murder of Danielle McLaughlin, a 28-year-old backpacker from County Donegal, whose body was found in a field in Goa in March 2017.
- 15 February – A 34-year-old man, Quam Babatunde, died after being stabbed on South Anne Street in Dublin.
- 17 February – The director of the Office of the Central Foreign Affairs Commission, Wang Yi, met the taoiseach, Micheál Martin, and the tánaiste, Simon Harris, at Government Buildings to discuss bilateral relations. Martin visited China as minister for foreign affairs in May 2010, and as tánaiste in November 2023. Xi Jinping visited Ireland in 2012 before he became the CCP general secretary. The Chinese premier, Li Keqiang, visited in 2015, and his successor, Li Qiang, visited in January 2024.
- 19 February – The European Organisation for Nuclear Research (CERN) accepted in principle Ireland's application to join the organization as an associate member, starting next year. CERN near Geneva is the largest particle physics laboratory in the world and is the home of the Large Hadron Collider in which protons collide destructively at cosmic speed.
- 21 February – Sinn Féin confirmed it would boycott Saint Patrick's Day events at the White House over US President Donald Trump's stance on the Israel-Gaza conflict.
- 25 February – The Irish and UK governments announced plans to explore formal engagement with paramilitary groups to help bring about their disbandment.
- 27 February – The taoiseach met the president of Ukraine at Shannon Airport. Zelenskyy was flying to Washington DC to meet the president of the United States.
- 28 February – Irish and European political leaders declared support for President Zelenskyy and Ukraine following an angry public exchange between the American and Ukrainian presidents in Washington DC. Speaking on The Late Late Show, the taoiseach said, "We've got to hold our nerve in Europe. We've got to get behind Ukraine, engage with the United States and others, with a view to giving Ukraine the security that it requires." The minister for foreign affairs tweeted, "Ukraine is not to blame for this war brought about by Russia's illegal invasion. We stand with Ukraine."

=== March ===
- 4 March – An 11-year-old boy was stabbed by another child at a primary school in Dublin. The victim was brought to hospital with serious injuries.
- 6 March – Taoiseach Micheál Martin attended an Ireland–UK summit in Liverpool alongside UK Prime Minister Keir Starmer. Starmer said the two countries had "turned a page on the turbulent years" and were ready for a meaningful partnership.
- 12 March – Taoiseach Micheál Martin arrived at the White House to meet US President Donald Trump as part of the Irish Government's traditional round of Saint Patrick's Day engagements.
- 13 March – Gardaí launched an investigation after vandals damaged the Trump International Golf Links Ireland golf course in Doonbeg, County Clare.

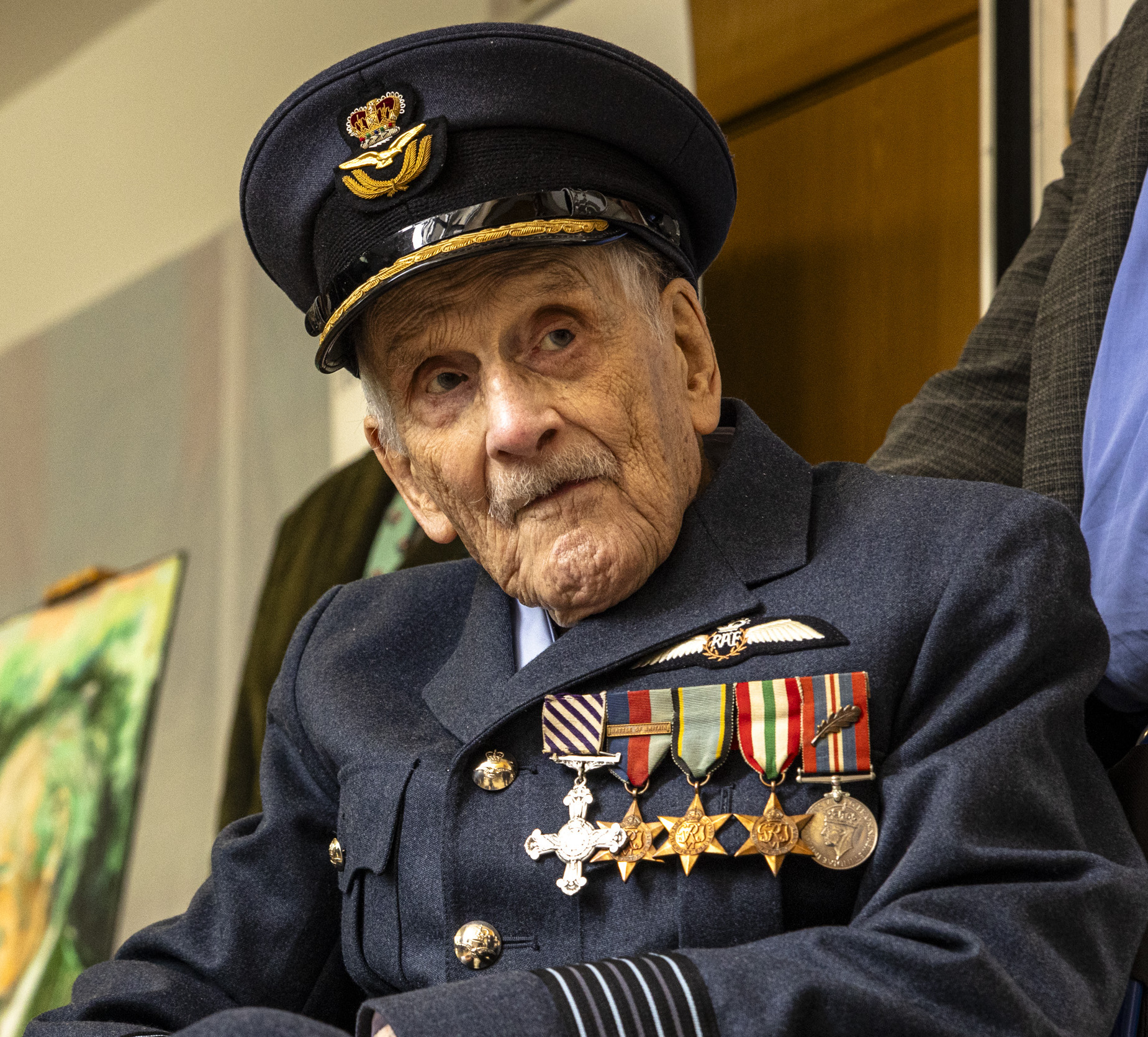
John "Paddy" Hemingway, last surviving pilot of the Battle of Britain

- 17 March
  - The Second World War Royal Air Force fighter pilot, John "Paddy" Hemingway, from Dublin, died at the age of 105. He served in the Battle of Dunkirk, the Battle of Britain (he was the last surviving pilot of the battle), the Invasion of Italy, and the Invasion of Normandy. He was shot down four times.
  - The taoiseach condemned as "wrong" statements made by Conor McGregor during the fighter's meeting with the US president, Donald Trump, in the Oval Office on Saint Patrick's Day. McGregor attacked the Irish government and its policies on immigration and asylum seekers. Micheál Martin said McGregor did not represent the views of the people of Ireland. The tánaiste and minister for foreign affairs, Simon Harris, echoed Martin's remarks. The chief executive of the Dublin Rape Crisis Centre, Rachel Morrogh, said the meeting between McGregor and Trump was shocking since a jury had recently found that McGregor had committed rape. Matthew O'Toole of the Social Democratic and Labour Party said the meeting was an "insult to the island of Ireland" and "deeply depressing", and that McGregor was an "appalling individual" and "beyond the pale". Referring to Trump and McGregor, Ruth Coppinger TD said in Dáil Éireann, "two rapists met each other in the White House". During the meeting, Trump described McGregor as "inspiring" and "fantastic".
- 19 March – The Turkish group Democratic Türkiye Community in Ireland began a multi-day series of demonstrations in Dublin against the arrest of Ekrem İmamoğlu, mayor of Istanbul and aspirant presidential candidate in Turkey.
- 20 March – Sheep and cattle farmer Michael Gaine disappeared in County Kerry. Human remains, subsequently found, were identified as being those of the missing man.
- 25 March – An angry and chaotic row broke out in Dáil Éireann leading the Ceann Comhairle to adjourn the session after the government won a vote to change standing orders which allowed the Regional Independents' technical group additional speaking time in the Dáil.
- 28 March – Seismometers across Ireland detected the magnitude 7.7 earthquake that struck Mandalay just before 7 am, Irish time. The shockwaves reached Ireland a few minutes later.
- 29 March – A partial solar eclipse, the deepest for a decade, was visible from Ireland.

=== April ===
- 1 April – Dáil Éireann voted 96–71 to uphold a motion of confidence in Ceann Comhairle Verona Murphy, the first time the Dáil had voted on a motion of confidence in a Ceann Comhairle.
- 15 April – The sky above Ireland was lit by the northern lights overnight.
- 16 April – An electricity interconnector was launched between Pembrokeshire in Wales and Great Island in Wexford Harbour. The 190 km cable will allow electricity to be imported from Britain and surplus Irish electricity to be exported from Ireland.
- 19 April – Aontú submitted a bill to the bills office of the Dáil seeking to allow Northern Ireland citizens to vote in Irish presidential elections.
- 22 April – It was announced that President Higgins and his wife, Sabina, the taoiseach, Michaél Martin, and the tánaiste, Simon Harris, would attend the funeral of Pope Francis on 26 April. Francis died yesterday, on Easter Monday.

=== May ===
- 2 May – The Data Protection Commission fined the video-sharing app TikTok €530 million because of the company's violation of the General Data Protection Regulation when it transferred the personal data of European users to China.
- 7 May – RTÉ asked the European Broadcasting Union for a discussion about Israel's inclusion in the Eurovision Song Contest because of the continuing war in Gaza.
- 8 May – Eamon Martin, the Archbishop of Armagh and Primate of All Ireland, paid tribute to the newly-elected Pope Leo XIV, describing him as "calm, affable and approachable", and a "friend of Ireland".
- 11 May – 49-year-old Garda Kevin Flatley became the 90th Garda to be killed in the line of duty after being struck by a motorcycle at a speed checkpoint in north county Dublin.
- 22 May – Following a protracted period of wrangling within the camogie community over the Camogie Association Rule 6a that players must wear skirts or skorts (shorts that look like a skirt) or divided skirts during matches, delegates at a special congress in Croke Park voted 98 percent in favour of adding shorts to the uniform alternatives, shorts being the preferred choice of players themselves.
- 24 May – The first intact Roman pot found in Ireland was discovered at Drumanagh in County Dublin.
- 26 May – The investigation into the disappearance of Fiona Pender was reclassified as a murder investigation, as Gardaí began searches near Killeigh.

=== June ===
- 3 June – In an e-mail to staff, Adam Smyth, the director of BBC Northern Ireland, said the BBC has "no intention" of blocking its news or other output in the Republic of Ireland.
- 4 June – Richard Satchwell was sentenced to life imprisonment by Dublin's Central Criminal Court for the March 2017 murder of his wife, Tina Satchwell, who was buried under the stairs at their home in Youghal, County Cork.
- 6 June
  - Garda Commissioner Drew Harris announced a review into the investigation of the murder of Tina Satchwell.
  - Ten cattle were killed by a lightning strike at Butlersbridge, County Cavan.
- 17 June – A major demonstration took place outside the Dáil over Ireland's growing housing crisis.
- 20 June – An Coimisiún Pleanála refused an application to redevelop the site of the Creeslough explosion with the establishment of another petrol station and shop.

=== July ===
- 3 July – The partner of Ashling Murphy reached a settlement with BBC Northern Ireland over a defamation case concerning a November 2023 edition of The View which discussed his victim impact statement.
- 10 July – The Department of Justice, Home Affairs and Migration rejected visa applications for a team of GAA Palestine players from the West Bank who were scheduled to visit Ireland for a tour later in the month.
- 14 July – A full excavation began of a mass grave at the site of the former Bon Secours Mother and Baby Home in Tuam, County Galway.
- 21 July – Forty-five thousand fans greeted the victorious Tipperary hurling team at Semple Stadium in Thurles after the team's victory over Cork in yesterday's All-Ireland hurling final match at Croke Park in Dublin.
- 28 July – Thousands of Gaelic football fans greeted the victorious Kerry football team in Rathmore, Tralee, and Killarney after the team's victory over Donegal in yesterday's All-Ireland football final match at Croke Park in Dublin.
- 31 July – Mixed martial arts fighter Conor McGregor lost a civil jury appeal against a finding that he sexually assaulted a woman.

=== August ===
- 3 August – While opening the Fleadh Cheoil music festival in Wexford, President Higgins called on the United Nations Security Council to intervene more effectively on behalf of the starving people of Gaza – which he called "the destruction of an entire people" – and for starving Israeli hostages held by Hamas – which he described as "a shocking act of cruelty". He said that using Chapter VII of the UN Charter would allow the international defence of a corridor to allow aid into Gaza.
- 6 August – Taoiseach Micheál Martin appealed to the kidnappers of Irish missionary Gena Heraty, kidnapped with a number of other people in Haiti on 3 August, to release her.
- 11 August – Thousands of fans greeted the victorious Galway camogie team in Ballinasloe and Clarinbridge after the team's victory over Cork in yesterday's All-Ireland camogie final match at Croke Park in Dublin.
- 12 August
  - President Michael D. Higgins condemned recent attacks on members of the Indian community in Ireland, describing them as "despicable" and "diminish all of us", while the annual India Day festival at Farmleigh was postponed due to fears over safety. Prashant Shuki, chair of the Ireland India Council said: "...the situation at the moment for holding India Day is not conducive ... we will announce new dates for India Day this year."
  - Responding to the famine in Gaza, the minister for foreign affairs, Simon Harris, joined 22 other European foreign ministers and those of Australia, Canada, and Japan in an appeal to Israel to unblock "food, nutrition supplies, shelter, fuel, clean water, medicine and medical equipment" into the starving territory.
- 13 August – The fashion accessories retailer Claire's went into administration in the UK and Ireland.
- 14 August – Mairead McGuinness of Fine Gael ended her candidacy in the forthcoming presidential election on medical advice following a stay in hospital last week.
- 17 August – In an article for The Irish Times, author Sally Rooney said she will continue to support Palestine Action despite it having been proscribed as a terrorist group by the UK government.
- 28 August – Over 2,600 school secretaries and caretakers, who are members of Fórsa, began indefinite strike action to highlight their demands for public sector pensions and other entitlements.
- 29 August – A mass was held at Glasnevin Cemetery commemorating the 50th anniversary of the death of Éamon de Valera, in attendance by his grandson Éamon Ó Cuív and Bertie Ahern, both of whom expressed interest in their candidacy for the presidential election.
- 30 August – Taoiseach Micheál Martin endorsed former Dublin Gaelic football manager Jim Gavin as the Fianna Fáil Presidential candidate.
- 31 August – Colum Eastwood, the former leader of the Social Democratic and Labour Party, ruled himself out of running in the presidential election.

=== September ===
- 3 September – Temperature trends recorded by Met Éireann showed that spring and summer this year were the hottest experienced by the island of Ireland since records began in 1900. The average summer temperature in 2025 was 16.19 °C. Unpredictable levels of wetness and dryness in the past four years caused by human-induced atmospheric heating created uncertain and difficult operating conditions for Irish farmers, with extremes of heat, and consequent increases in both rain and drought, expected to grow.
- 5 September – Former taoiseach and Fianna Fáil leader Bertie Ahern, former Met Éireann meteorologist Joanna Donnelly and the creator and former star of Riverdance, Michael Flatley, all confirmed they had withdrawn their presidential candidacies.
- 6 September – Fórsa withdrew strike action by school secretaries and caretakers after an agreement was reached at the Workplace Relations Commission to engage in resolving the dispute.
- 8 September
  - Sinn Féin leader Mary Lou McDonald ruled herself out of running in the Irish presidential election.
  - RTÉ reported that Gardaí were investigating a number of phone calls to Garda stations relating to threats against the home of tánaiste Simon Harris.
- 11 September – RTÉ said it would not take part in the 2026 Eurovision Song Contest "if the participation of Israel goes ahead".
- 19 September – Secretary of State for Northern Ireland Hilary Benn and Tánaiste Simon Harris announced a new UK and Irish deal on the legacy of the Troubles to replace the Northern Ireland Troubles (Legacy and Reconciliation) Act, with Harris describing the new framework as "a big step forward".
- 20 September
  - Cearta: A National Protest for the Irish language and the Gaeltacht was held in Dublin. A rally left Parnell Square and proceeded to a demonstration at Leinster House, the seat of Government. Activists sought improvements in funding of the Irish language and the Gaelacht, as well as improvements in Gaeltacht housing, education, and language rights.
  - Sinn Féin announced it would back Independent TD Catherine Connolly in the forthcoming presidential election.
- 24 September – Closing date for nominations in the Presidential election. Catherine Connolly, Jim Gavin and Heather Humphreys emerged as the three candidates.
- 25 September – The Hawaiian Nobel Prize winner and former president of the United States, Barack Obama, accepted the Freedom of the City of Dublin at a ceremony "held for security reasons" in the Shelbourne Hotel in Dublin. He was also presented by the Lord Mayor of Dublin with a bottle of Dublin whiskey and a first edition of James Joyce's novel, Ulysses. Obama and his wife, Michelle, were granted the honour by Dublin City Council "in its infinite wisdom", according to the Lord Mayor, in 2017. Obama revealed that he would not be grazing sheep in St Stephen's Green, because he has none.
- 29 September – Three people were found dead at a property in Drumgowna, County Louth. A man was arrested in connection with the deaths.
- 30 September – A man was charged in connection with three deaths in County Louth.

=== October ===
- 1 October – Met Éireann issued a Status Yellow wind warning ahead of the arrival of Storm Amy, the first named storm of the 2025–26 season, on Friday 3 October.
- 3 October – About 174,000 properties were without power across Ireland as Storm Amy battered the country, with a Status Orange wind warning issued for the northwest and a Status Red wind warning issued for County Donegal, where a man fell to his death in Letterkenny.
- 5 October – Fianna Fáil candidate Jim Gavin withdrew from the Irish presidential election, stating he had "made a mistake that was not in keeping with my character and the standards I set myself".
- 7 October
  - The 2026 Irish budget was presented by the Minister for Finance Paschal Donohoe and the Minister for Public Expenditure Jack Chambers.
  - Jack Chambers announced the restoration of daily flights between Derry and Dublin from 2026; the route was withdrawn in 2011.
- 9 October – RTÉ announced that broadcaster Ray D'Arcy had been fired.
- 16 October – Betting firm Paddy Power announced the closure of 57 outlets in the UK and Ireland.
- 17 October – One week before the forthcoming presidential election, a campaign was launched in Dublin to encourage people to spoil their votes. The "Spoil the Vote" campaign included businessman Declan Ganley who said he believed the ballot was rigged.
- 18 October – A 17-year-old boy was charged with the murder of a Ukrainian teenage boy who was stabbed at an emergency accommodation in north Dublin.
- 19 October – Phase 7 of the BusConnects transport infrastructure programme was launched in Dublin
- 21 October – Six people were arrested for public order offences after a protest at an International Protection Accommodation Services in Citywest turned violent.
- 22 October – The energy minister, Darragh O'Brien, said that Ireland is planning to construct a submarine electricity interconnector to Spain during the 2030s. Ireland has two existing connectors to Britain, with a third planned, and one to France to be introduced in 2027.
- 23 October – On the eve of the presidential election, singer Bob Geldof confirmed that he would have won easily, had he been a candidate. Speaking at an event to mark the 50th anniversary of the first concert by The Nightlife Thugs (later The Boomtown Rats), he said, "If I'd stood, I'd have walked it. And I would have been really good."
- 24 October – Presidential election day. Voting took place between 7 am and 10 pm in more than 5,500 polling stations.
- 25 October – Vote counting for the presidential election started at 9 am. Catherine Connolly was declared the tenth president of Ireland in Dublin Castle at 7.22 pm. In a record-breaking election, she won the most first preference votes ever in an Irish presidential election (63.4 percent); the number of spoiled votes was the highest ever (12.9 percent); and voter turnout was low (45.8 percent).
- 31 October
  - At a hearing in New York, Marcin Pieciak pleaded guilty to the manslaughter of Irish citizen Sarah McNally, of County Longford, who was stabbed at a pub in Queens in 2024.
  - Firefighters rescued five people, including four children, from an International Protection Accommodation Services centre in Drogheda, County Louth, after fireworks were thrown into the building, causing a fire.

=== November ===
- 1 November – Newly published figures showed that the number of Irish citizens deported from the United States had risen by 50% in 2025 compared to the previous year.
- 5 November – President-elect Catherine Connolly and her husband Brian McEnery visited President Higgins and his wife Sabina at Áras an Uachtaráin. After two presidential terms, or 14 years, the Higginses will leave the presidential residence for their home in Galway the day before the Connolly inauguration on the 11th.
- 6 November – The taoiseach, Micheál Martin, addressed the UN COP30 climate change summit in Belém, Brazil stating "I am concerned that the spirit of common purpose is weakening" and that there were fewer world leaders at the conference this year.
- 7 November – The team excavating the Bon Secours Mother and Baby Home in Tuam, County Galway, announced they had found seven sets of infant remains, but said they were unsure if these date to the time the home was in operation, or from an earlier time.
- 8 November – The Football Association of Ireland overwhelmingly backed a motion to call on UEFA to ban Israel from European club and international games.
- 10 November
  - Michael D. Higgins and his wife Sabina left Áras an Uachtaráin on the final day of his presidency. His term of office expired at midnight.
  - An outbreak of avian flu was confirmed at a farm in Clontibret, County Monaghan.
- 11 November
  - Catherine Connolly was inaugurated at midday as the new president of Ireland in Saint Patrick's Hall at Dublin Castle.
  - The minister for international development, Neale Richmond, arrived in Brazil for a busy round of engagements at the COP30 climate summit.
  - The sky above Ireland was lit by the northern lights overnight.
- 14 November – The Department of Foreign Affairs revealed that 242,772 people in the United Kingdom applied for an Irish passport last year.
- 17 November – The climate minister and leader of the Irish COP30 climate summit delegation Darragh O'Brien hosted an international meeting in Brazil to work towards including "a clear road map that shows how the world can exit fossil [fuels]" in the final agreement that the Brazilian summit presidency was aiming for.
- 18 November – The minister for finance Paschal Donohoe resigned to take up the second most senior position in the World Bank, as Managing Director and Chief Knowledge Officer.
- 19 November – Speaking to the broadcaster RTÉ at the COP30 climate summit in Brazil, former president of Ireland Mary Robinson expressed her frustration as a lawyer that conference negotiators are not highlighting their legal obligations under the Paris Accords, the Kyoto Protocol, and international law to reduce greenhouse gas emissions and protect the climate. She was also dissatisfied that the UNFCCC Gender Action Plan was not receiving the priority it needed. The Plan is a framework to connect gender equality and female empowerment to climate policies and actions to reflect the reality that women and children suffer most from climate change.
- 20 November- A private Vulcanair P.68 crashes near Lissalen, Co Waterford killing the pilot. A fuel pump issue was blamed for the accident.
- 21 November – The taoiseach, Micheál Martin, arrived in Johannesburg before tomorrow's two-day G20 summit. He participated in a series of events and bilateral meetings during the day.
- 22 November – Daragh Morgan from County Galway became the second person to swim around Ireland, travelling 1,468 kilometres. The first Irish circumnavigation by swimming was performed by Henry O'Donnell in May 2022.
- 22–23 November – Micheál Martin attended the G20 summit. It was Ireland's first time participating in such a summit, at the invitation of the South African presidency. Martin held further bilateral meetings with world leaders on the margins.
- 26 November – President Connolly received her first foreign head of government visitor, First Minister of Scotland, John Swinney, at Áras an Uachtaráin.
- 27 November – Taxi drivers protested in Dublin against a new Uber fixed-price fare scheme. Traffic was delayed by the disruption, including routes to Dublin Airport.

=== December ===
- 1 December – The president of Ukraine Volodymyr Zelenskyy and his wife Olena Zelenska arrived from Paris just before 11 pm to begin their first official state visit to Ireland. They were greeted at Dublin Airport by the taoiseach, Micheál Martin, and by Thomas Byrne, the minister of state for European affairs. Zelenskyy previously met the taoiseach in Ireland during a refuelling stop at Shannon Airport in February.
- 2 December – Amid tight security including traffic disruption in Dublin, President Zelenskyy and Olena Zelenska began their round of formal engagements with a visit to President Connolly at Áras an Uachtaráin. This was to be followed by a bilateral meeting at Government Buildings between the taoiseach and Zelenskyy; a trade forum with the tánaiste and minister for foreign affairs; the inauguration of the Ireland-Ukraine Economic Forum; a press conference at Government Buildings; an address in person by Zelenskyy to a joint sitting of the Oireachtas; a meeting between Olena Zelenska and the minister for higher education; and a meeting between the Zelenskyys and representatives of the Ukrainian community in Ireland.
- 3 December – Taxi drivers held their second protest in Dublin and Galway against a new Uber fixed-price fare scheme. Traffic was delayed by the disruption, including routes to Dublin Airport.
- 4 December – The Supreme Court ruled that it would not permit a further appeal by the fighter Conor McGregor against a High Court finding last year that he raped Nikita Hand. The Court also dismissed an appeal by McGregor's friend, James Lawrence, against a decision not to award him his costs in the case.
- 5 December
  - The team excavating the Bon Secours Mother and Baby Home in Tuam, County Galway, said they had uncovered evidence of a burial ground.
  - The Garda Síochána launched an investigation following reports of drone activity in the skies on the night President Zelenskyy arrived in Ireland.
- 7 December – Gardaí launched a murder investigation following the death of a woman and a young boy in a house fire at a property in Edenderry, County Offaly.
- 16 December – The EU's Soil Monitoring Law entered into force, intended to protect and restore soils in member states, and ensure they are used sustainably.
- 17 December – The Swedish activist Greta Thunberg visited President Connolly at Áras an Uachtaráin during the afternoon. She was in Dublin for a winter fundraising event for families in Gaza.
- 18 December – Tasers were issued for the first time to 128 gardaí (police) in four garda stations as part of a pilot programme in response to an increase in violent attacks. Since 2007, only specialist armed gardaí had them (typical gardaí are unarmed). The Irish Council for Civil Liberties criticised the initiative.
- 31 December – Five people were taken to hospital following an arson attack on a house in the Finglas area of Dublin.

== Arts and sciences ==
- 5 January – Irish actor Colin Farrell won his third Golden Globe award at a ceremony in Beverly Hills, California for his performance in The Penguin television series. He won previously for his performances in the films In Bruges and The Banshees of Inisherin.
- 7 February – Norwegian singer Emmy was chosen to represent Ireland in the Eurovision Song Contest 2025 with the song "Laika Party". The winner was chosen by combined votes of the public vote, an international jury and a national jury on the Late Late Show Eurosong Special.
- 23 February – Colin Farrell won a Screen Actors Guild award at a ceremony in Los Angeles, California for best actor in a television miniseries for his performance in The Penguin.
- 15 May – Emmy failed to qualify for the Eurovision Song Contest 2025 final.
- 23 June – U2 guitarist David Evans, known as The Edge, became an Irish citizen at a ceremony in Killarney, County Kerry. He had been the only member of his band not to be an Irish citizen.
- 25 June – Author Donal Ryan won the Orwell Prize for political fiction for Heart, Be at Peace.
- 8 August – The world record for the most tin whistles played together was beaten by 2,516 musicians, attending the Fleadh Cheoil music festival, who performed The Boys of Wexford and Fáinne Geal an Lae at Wexford Park stadium.
- 18 November – Research was published that identified more than 600 suspected hilltop dwellings dating to the Neolithic period and Early Bronze Age in the Brusselstown Ring, "a site of major national and international heritage importance" within the Baltinglass Hillfort Cluster, making it the largest nucleated prehistoric settlement by far ever discovered in Ireland and Britain. The discovery won the Prehistoric Society's James Dyer prize for 2025 and challenged the theory that the Vikings built the first Irish towns; the Baltinglass settlement existed 2,000 years before the Vikings arrived.
- 4 December – RTÉ announced that it would not broadcast, nor would Ireland participate in, the 2026 Eurovision Song Contest because the European Broadcasting Union permitted Israel to take part. Spain, the Netherlands, and Slovenia made similar announcements.

== Sport ==
=== Association football (men) ===
==== Nations League ====
Play-off fixtures:

- 20 March – Bulgaria 1–2 Ireland.
- 23 March – Ireland 2–1 Bulgaria (4–2 agg).

==== International friendly matches ====
- 6 June – Ireland 1–1 Senegal.
- 10 June – Luxembourg 0–0 Ireland.

==== 2026 World Cup qualification ====
UEFA Group F:

- 6 September – Ireland 2–2 Hungary.
- 9 September – Armenia 2–1 Ireland.
- 11 October – Portugal 1–0 Ireland.
- 14 October – Ireland 1–0 Armenia.
- 13 November – Ireland 2–0 Portugal.
- 16 November – Hungary 2–3 Ireland.

Ireland advanced to the play-off round.

Play-off semi-final

- 26 March 2026 – Czech Republic v Ireland.

Play-off final

- 31 March 2026 – Czech Republic or Ireland v Denmark or North Macedonia.

=== Association football (women) ===
==== Nation's League ====
Group B2

- 21 February – Ireland 1–0 Turkey. This was the team's first match with manager Carla Ward in charge, after she replaced Eileen Gleeson.
- 25 February – Slovenia 4–0 Ireland.
- 4 April – Greece 0–4 Ireland.
- 8 April – Ireland 2–1 Greece.
- 30 May – Turkey 1–2 Ireland.
- 3 June – Ireland 1–0 Slovenia.

Play-off fixtures:

- 24 October – Ireland 4–2 Belgium.
- 28 October – Belgium 2–1 Ireland
  (Ireland 5–4 Belgium aggregate).

==== International friendly matches ====
- 26 June – USA 4–0 Ireland (in Denver).
- 29 June – USA 4–0 Ireland (in Cincinnati).
- 29 November – Ireland 3–2 Hungary (in Marbella).

=== Camogie ===
All-Ireland Senior Camogie Championship:

Semi-finals:

- 26 July
  - Galway 1–18 to 1–11 Tipperary.
  - Cork 1–21 to 1–11 Waterford.

All-Ireland camogie final:

- 10 August – Galway beat Cork and lifted the O'Duffy Cup in Croke Park, Dublin.
  Result: Cork 1–13 to 1–14 Galway.

=== Gaelic football ===
2025 All-Ireland Senior Football Championship:

- 27 July – Kerry beat Donegal and lifted the Sam Maguire Cup in Croke Park, Dublin. Score: Kerry 1–26 to 0–19 Donegal.

=== Golf ===
- 13 April – Rory McIlroy became the sixth golfer and the first European to win a career grand slam when he won the Masters Tournament in Augusta National Golf Club in Georgia, USA.
- 7 September – Rory McIlroy won the Irish Open for the second time after a play-off against Joakim Lagergren from Sweden.
- 10 September – It was announced that Donald Trump's Doonbeg golf course will be the venue for the 2026 Irish Open, on 10–13 September.
- 28 September – Irish golfers Rory McIlroy and Shane Lowry were part of the European team that won the Ryder Cup in Farmingdale, New York.

=== Hurling ===
2025 All-Ireland Senior Hurling Championship:

- 20 July – Tipperary beat Cork and lifted the Liam MacCarthy Cup in Croke Park, Dublin. Score: Cork 1–18 to 3–27 Tipperary.

=== Rowing ===
- 26 September – Fintan McCarthy and Philip Doyle won the bronze medal in the men's double sculls at the World Rowing Championships in Shanghai.

=== Rugby (men) ===
Six Nations Championship

- 1 February – Ireland 27–22 England.
- 9 February – Scotland 18–32 Ireland.
- 22 February – Wales 18–22 Ireland. This was Ireland's 14th Triple Crown win, having defeated England, Scotland, and Wales.
- 8 March – Ireland 27–42 France.
- 15 March – Italy 17–22 Ireland.

Autumn Nations Series

- 1 November – Ireland 13–26 New Zealand (in Chicago).
- 8 November – Ireland 41–10 Japan.
- 15 November – Ireland 46–19 Australia.
- 22 November – Ireland 13–24 South Africa.

=== Rugby (women) ===
Six Nations Championship

- 22 March – Ireland 15–27 France.
- 30 March – Italy 12–54 Ireland.
- 12 April – Ireland 5–49 England.
- 20 April – Wales 14–40 Ireland.
- 26 April – Scotland 26–19 Ireland.

==== Women's Rugby World Cup ====
Pool C

- 24 August – Ireland 42–14 Japan.
- 31 August – Ireland 43–27 Spain.
- 7 September – New Zealand 40–0 Ireland.

Quarter-finals

- 14 September – France 18–13 Ireland.

== Annual events ==
(H) = public holiday

=== January ===
- 1 January – New Year's Day. (H)
- 6 January – Nollaig na mBan.
- 8–11 January – Young Scientist Exhibition.

=== February ===
- 1 February – Imbolc.
- 3 February – Saint Brigid's holiday. (H)
- 20 February–2 March – Dublin International Film Festival.

=== March ===
- 1–8 March – Irish Astronomy Week.
- 17 March – Saint Patrick's Day. (H)
- 20 March – Spring equinox.
- 28–30 March – Skellig Coast Dark Sky Festival (Féile Spéartha Dorcha).

=== April ===
- 8–13 April – Cúirt Festival of Literature.
- 21 April – Easter Monday. (H)

=== May ===
- 1 May – Bealtaine.
- 2–10 May – Galway Theatre Festival.
- 5 May – May holiday. (H)
- 16–25 May – International Literature Festival Dublin.
- 24 May–2 June – Fleadh Nua festival.
- 24 May–2 June – Cork Harbour Festival.
- 28 May–1 June – Listowel Writers' Week.
- 29 May–2 June – Bloom gardening festival.

=== June ===
- June – Pride Month.
- 2 June – June holiday. (H)
- 12–15 June – Yeats Day literary festival.
- 12–15 June – Taste of Dublin food festival.
- 16 June – Bloomsday.
- 20–22 June – Donegal International Rally.
- 21 June – Summer solstice.

=== July ===
- 5–6 July – Longitude Festival.
- 5–13 July – Willie Clancy Summer School.
- 20 July – All-Ireland hurling final.
- 23 July–1 August – Yeats International Summer School.
- 27 July – Reek Sunday.
- 27 July – All-Ireland football final.
- 28 July–3 August – Galway Races.

=== August ===
- 1 August – Lúnasa.
- 2 August – Bray Air Display.
- 4 August – August holiday. (H)
- 3–10 August – Fleadh Cheoil festival.
- 10 August – All-Ireland camogie final.
- 10–12 August – Puck Fair.
- 15–19 August – Rose of Tralee festival.
- 16–24 August – National Heritage Week.
- 29–31 August – Electric Picnic festival.

=== September ===
- 1–30 September – Lisdoonvarna Matchmaking Festival.
- 16–18 September – National Ploughing Championships.
- 22 September – Autumn equinox.
- 25 September–12 October – Dublin Theatre Festival.
- 26–28 September – Galway Oyster Festival.

=== October ===
- 4–10 October – National Space Week.
- 27 October – October holiday. (H)
- 31 October – Hallowe'en.

=== November ===
- 1 November – Samhain.

=== December ===
- 21 December – Winter solstice.
- 25 December – Christmas Day. (H)
- 26 December – Saint Stephen's Day, also Lá an Dreoilín. (H)

== Deaths ==
=== January ===
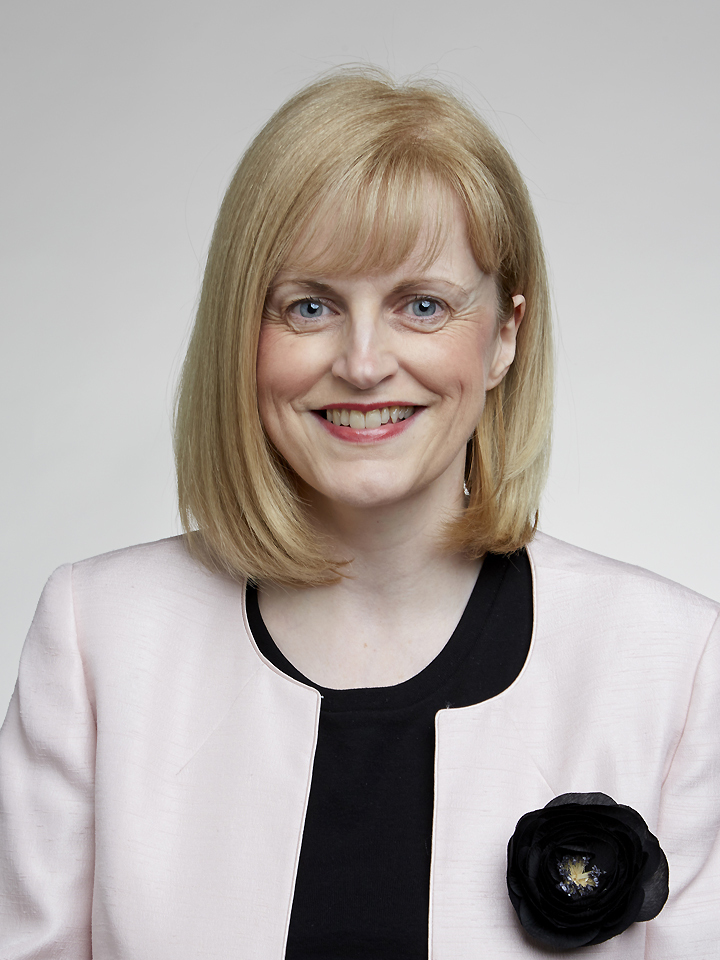
Eleanor Maguire

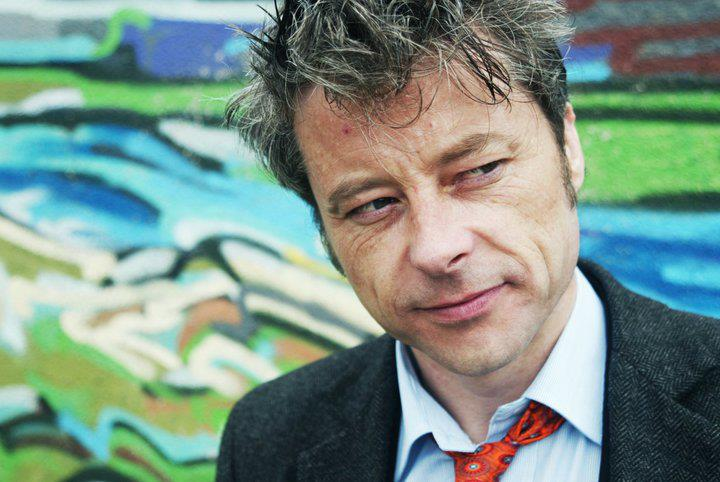
Robbie Bonham

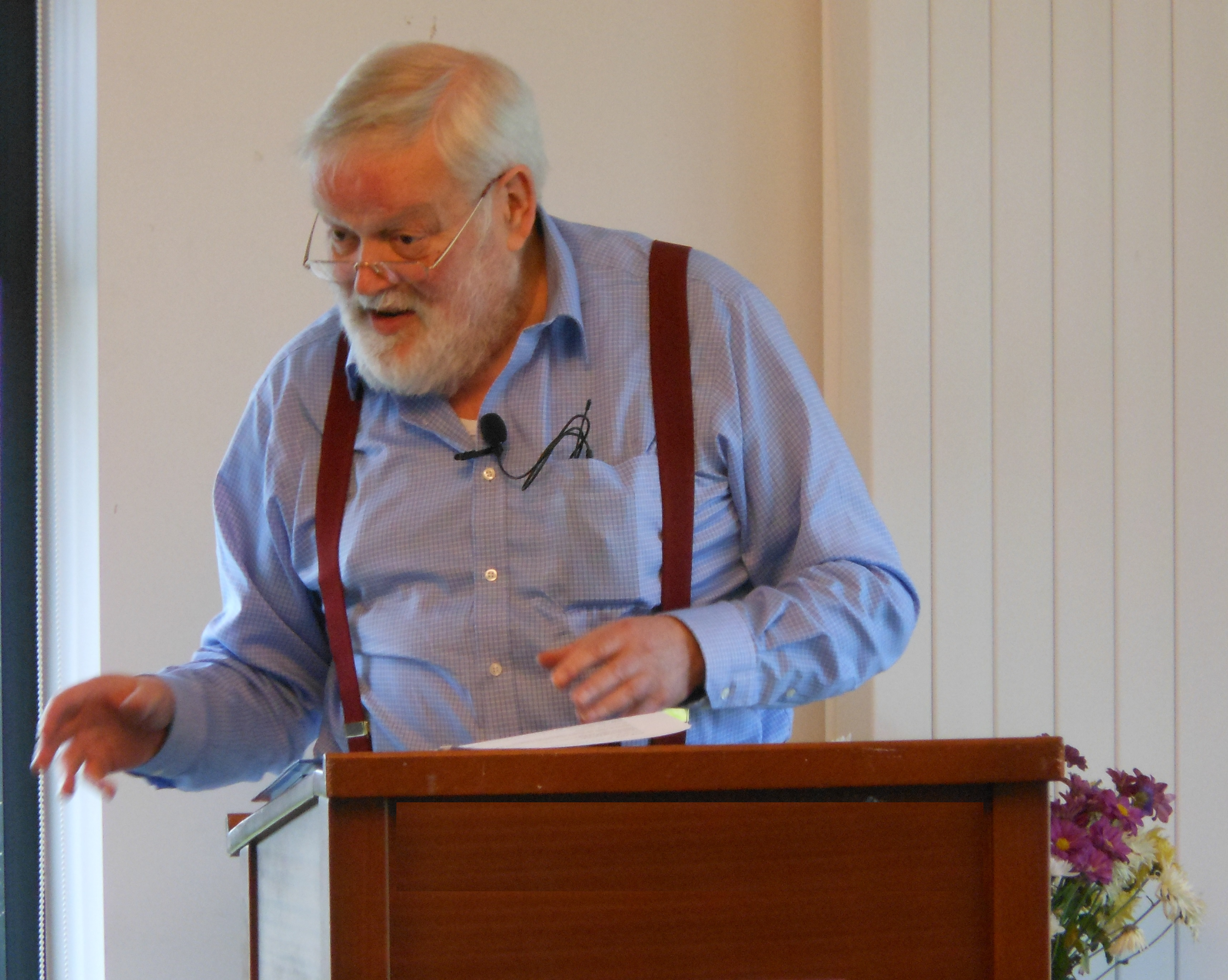
Michael Longley

- 2 January – Pádraig Ó Snodaigh, 89, Irish language writer, publisher, activist, and former president of Conradh na Gaeilge.
- 3 January – Donal Kelly, 86, journalist and news correspondent for RTÉ News.
- 4 January
  - Colm Connolly, 82, journalist, newsreader and reporter for RTÉ News.
  - Eleanor Maguire, 54, neuroscientist.
- 8 January – Des O'Grady, 72, Gaelic footballer (St Finbarr's, Cork senior team) and politician, county councillor (2014–2019).
- 9 January – Mick Kennedy, 89, hurler and Gaelic footballer (Marlfield, Clonmel Commercials, Faughs, Tipperary senior team, Dublin senior team, Leinster).
- 11 January – Kitty Flynn, 98, historian.
- 13 January – Mary Fennelly, 76, camogie player (St Paul's, Kilkenny senior team) and administrator, President of the Camogie Association (1982–1985).
- 14 January – Pat Goggin, 84, association footballer (Cork Hibernians, Tramore Athletic).
- 15 January – Linda Nolan, 65, singer, actress and television personality (The Nolans).
- 17 January – Martin Fallon, 55, Gaelic footballer (Strokestown, Roscommon senior team).
- 21 January – Robbie Bonham, 53, comedian and cartoonist.
- 22 January
  - Paddy Cole, 85, singer, saxophone player and band leader.
  - Michael Longley, 85, poet, Ireland Professor of Poetry (2007–2010). Born in Northern Ireland.
- 26 January – Éamonn Walsh, 79, politician, teachta dála (TD) (1992–1997).

=== February ===
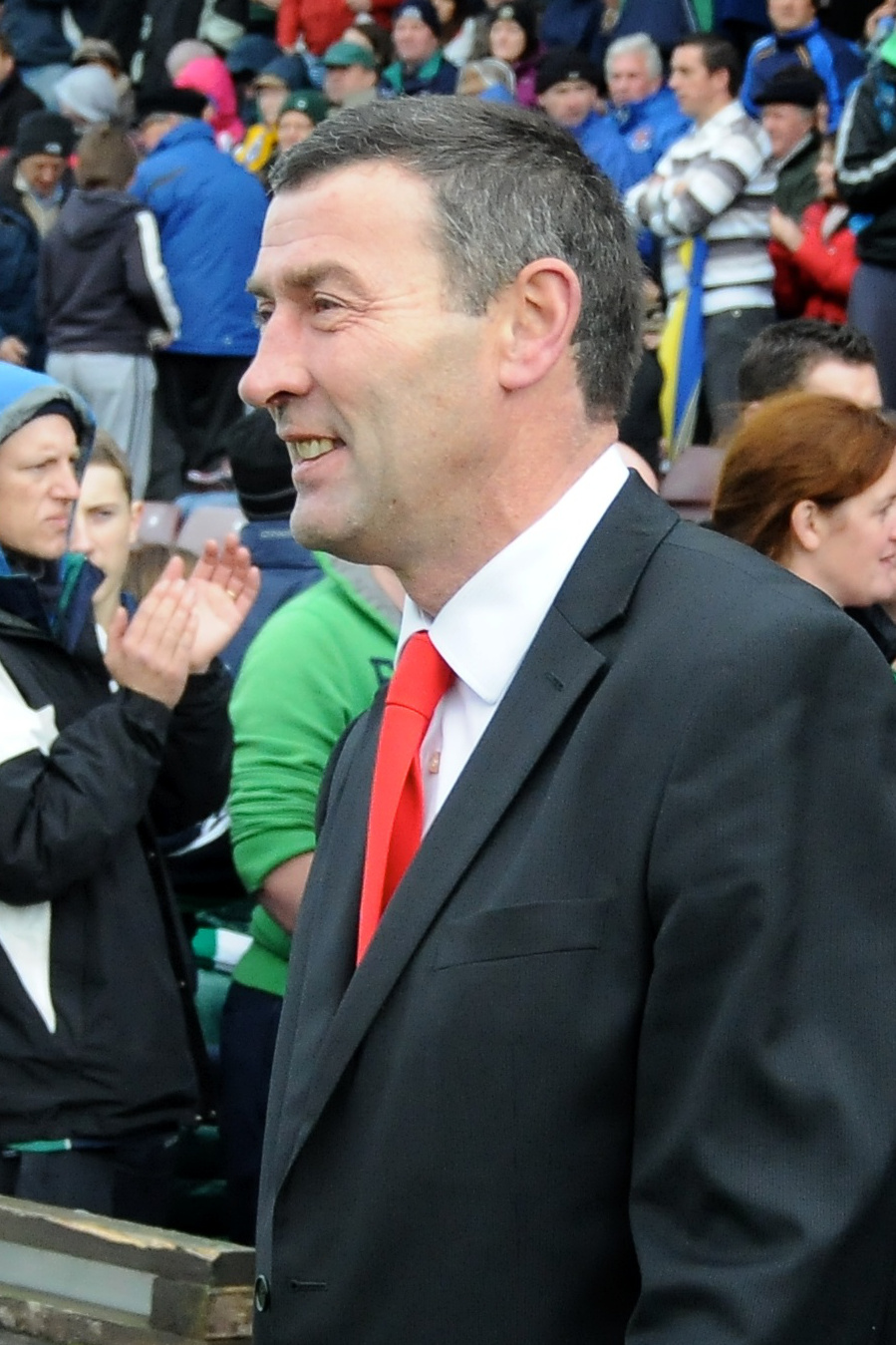
Michael Coleman

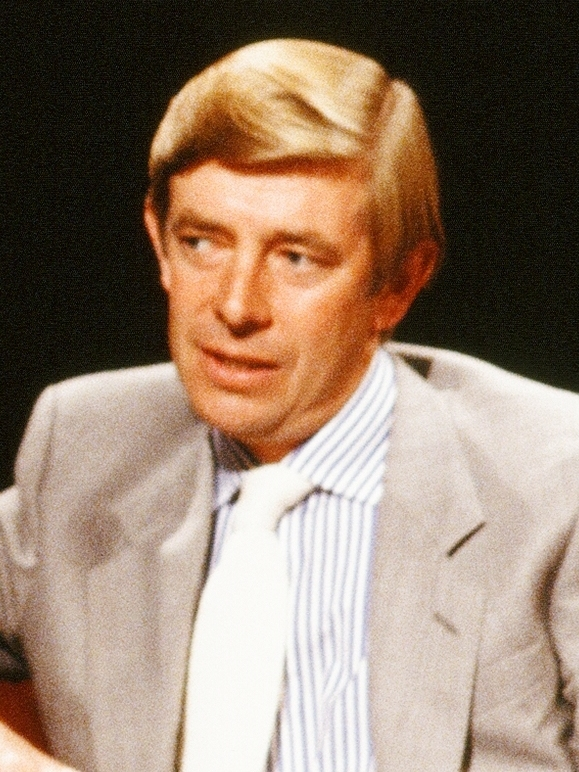
Henry Kelly

- 6 February – Paddy Cullen, 80, Gaelic footballer (O'Connell Boys, Dublin senior team, Leinster) and manager (Dublin senior team).
- 7 February – Michael Coleman, 61, hurler (Abbeyknockmoy, Galway senior team, Connacht).
- 8 February
  - John Cooney, 28, boxer, intracranial haemorrhage.
  - Matt Doyle, 70, tennis player. Born in the United States.
- 15 February – Eddie Wade, 76, politician, TD (1997–2002).
- 16 February – Michael O'Sullivan, 24, jockey.
- 17 February – Dan Wallace, 82, politician, TD (1982–2007) and Minister of State (1992–1993 and 1997–2002).
- 18 February – James Donovan, 80, forensic scientist.
- 19 February – Willie Walsh, 90, Roman Catholic prelate, Bishop of Killaloe (1994–2010).
- 21 February – Brendan McFarlane, 73, Irish republican activist.
- 22 February – Colette Doherty, poker player.
- 24 February – Johnny Culloty, 88, Gaelic footballer (Killarney Legion, East Kerry, Kerry senior team, Munster)).
- 26 February
  - Jennifer Johnston, 95, novelist and playwright.
  - Henry Kelly, 78, broadcaster, actor and journalist.
  - Ray Ryan, 43, hurler (Sarsfields, Cork senior team).

=== March ===
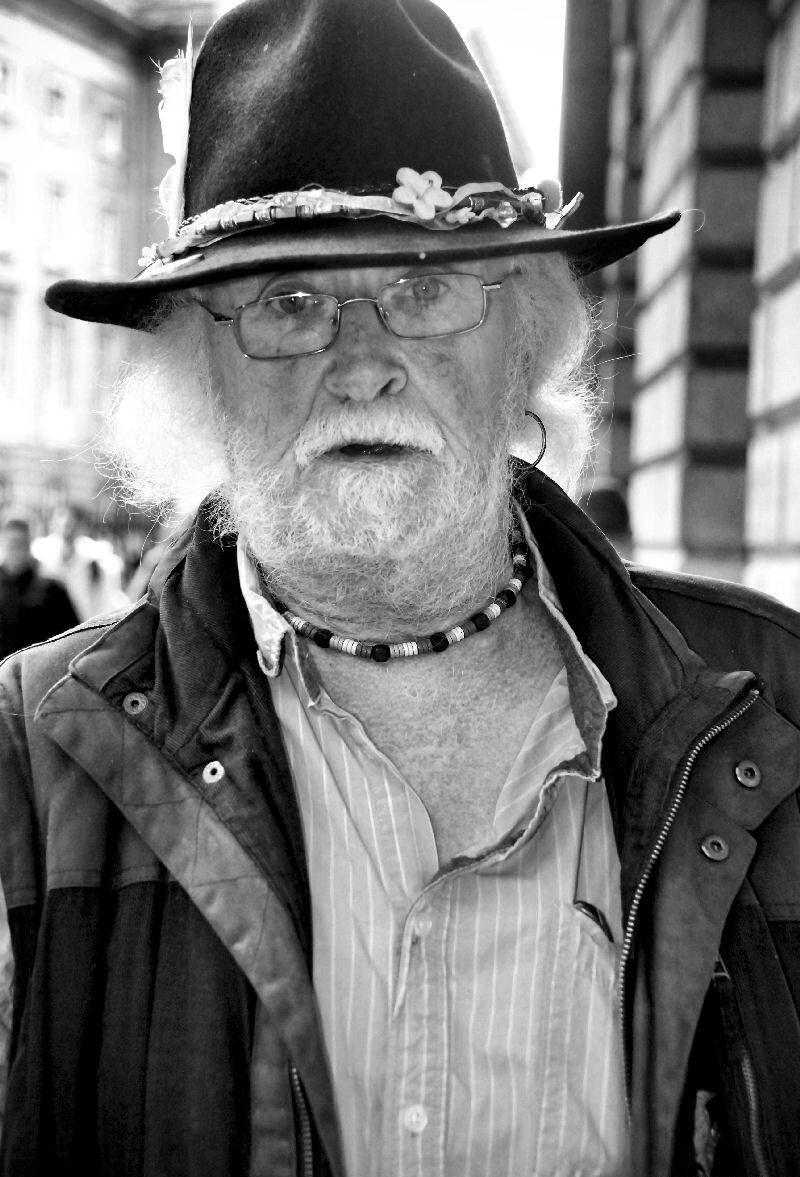
Pat Ingoldsby

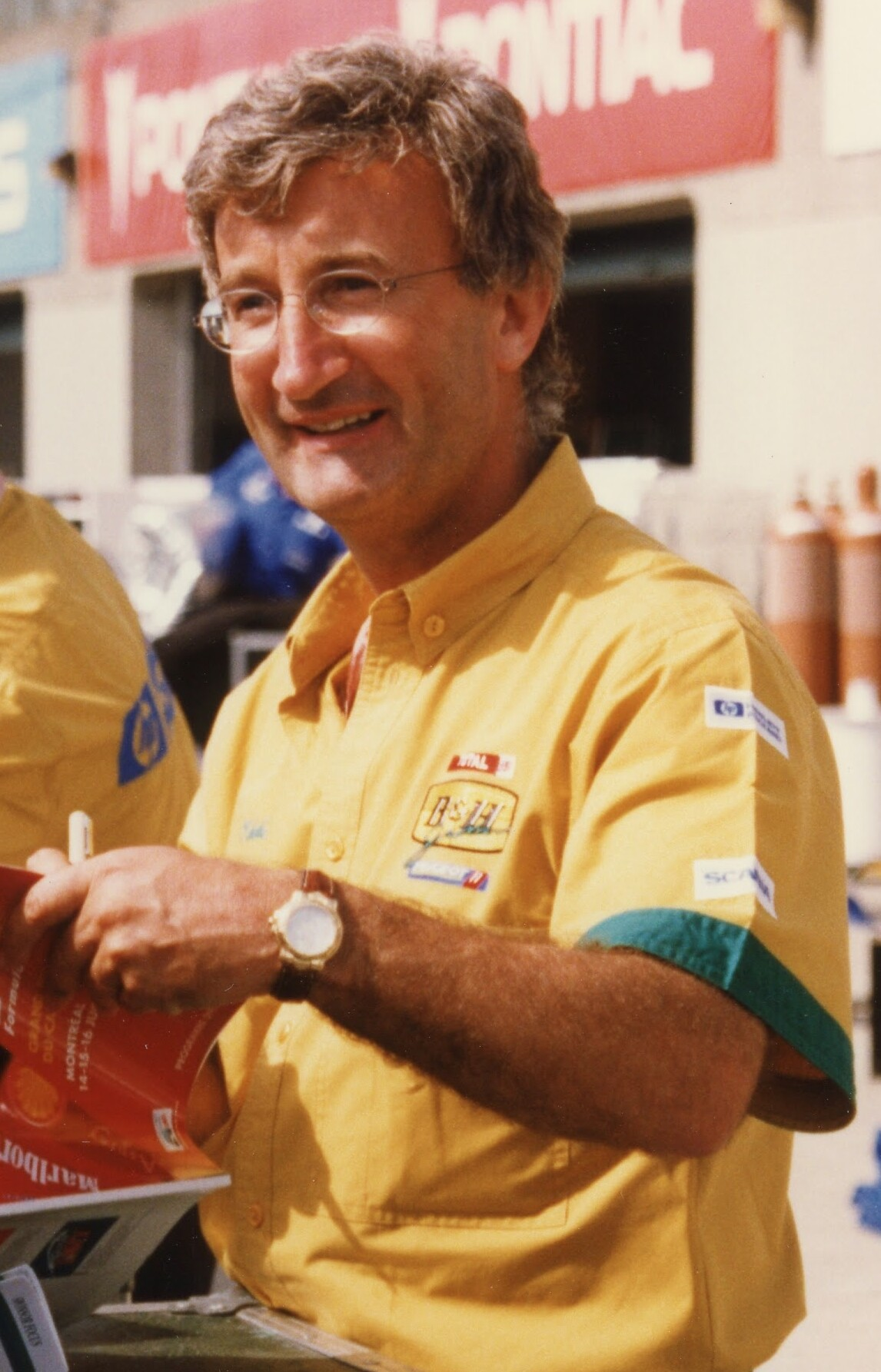
Eddie Jordan

- 1 March – Pat Ingoldsby, 82, poet, writer and broadcaster.
- 11 March – Billy Joyce, 75, Gaelic footballer (Killererin, Galway senior team) and manager (Galway senior team).
- 12 March
  - Billy McCombe, 76, rugby union player (Bangor, Dublin University, national team).
  - Fiona McHugh, 57, journalist and editor.
- 17 March
  - John Hemingway, 105, fighter pilot who served in the Second World War; last survivor of the Battle of Britain; shot down four times.
  - Ger FitzGerald, 60, hurler (Midleton, Cork senior team, Munster) and selector (Cork senior team).
- 20 March
  - Eddie Jordan, 76, racing driver and Formula One team owner.
  - Patrick Dineen, 87, businessman and cricketer (national team).
  - Ruby Druce née Crawford, 109, Ireland's oldest person, from Castlefin, County Donegal. Born in 1915.
- 25 March – Gene Mangan, 88, cyclist.
- 26 March – John Herrick, 78, footballer (Cork Hibernians, Galway United, national team) and manager (Galway United).
- 29 March – Ken Bruen, 74, writer.

=== April ===
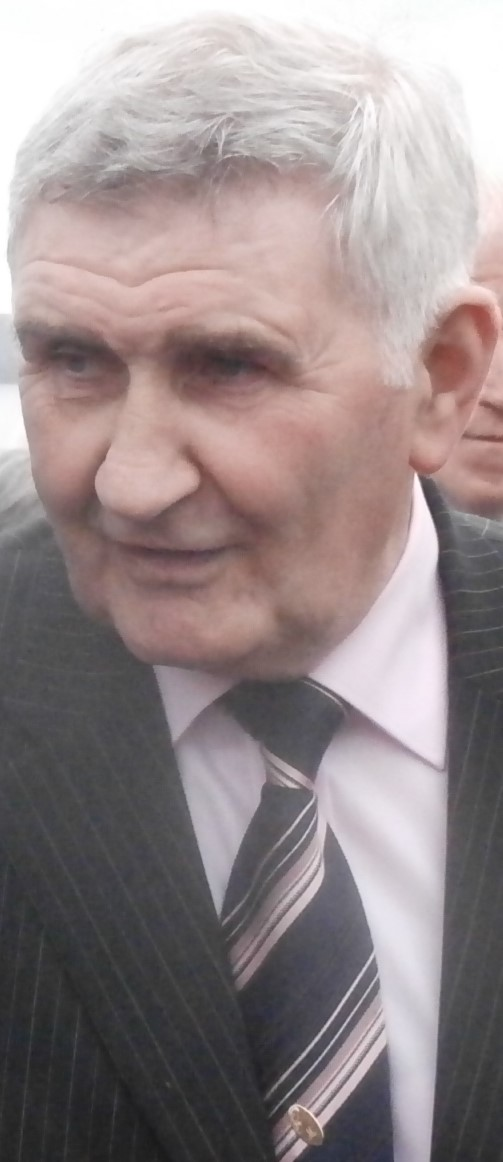
Mick O'Dwyer

- 2 April – Matt Hassett, 93, hurler (Toomevara, Tipperary senior team).
- 3 April – Mick O'Dwyer, 88, Gaelic footballer (Waterville, Kerry senior team, Munster) and manager (Kerry senior team).
- 6 April – Dan Murray, 90, Gaelic footballer (Macroom, Cork senior team, Munster).
- 7 April – Colman O'Donovan, 97, hurler (Midleton, Cork senior team).
- 9 April – Eamon Farrell, 83, footballer (Shamrock Rovers).
- 15 April – Seán Murphy, 93, Gaelic footballer (Dingle, West Kerry, Kerry senior team, Munster).
- 17 April – Billy Young, 87, footballer (Bohemians) and manager (Shamrock Rovers, Bohemians).
- 18 April – Clodagh Rodgers singer, 78.
- 19 April – Julian Benson, 54, terpsichorean.
- 20 April – Mick McGrath, 89, footballer (Blackburn Rovers, national team).
- 22 April – Michael O'Brien, 91, politician and activist.
- 25 April – Michael Hely-Hutchinson, 8th Earl of Donoughmore, 97, peer, member of the House of Lords (1981–1999).
- 28 April – Brendan Comiskey, 89, Roman Catholic prelate, Bishop of Ferns (1984–2002).
- 29 April – Tommy Keenan, 81, Gaelic footballer (Dunmore MacHales, Galway senior team) and selector (Galway minor team).
- 30 April – Seán Sherwin, 78, politician, TD (1970–1973).

=== May ===
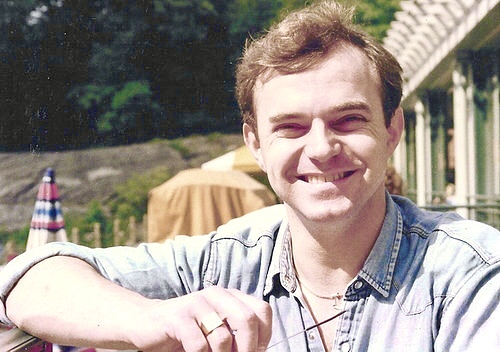
Peter Morwood

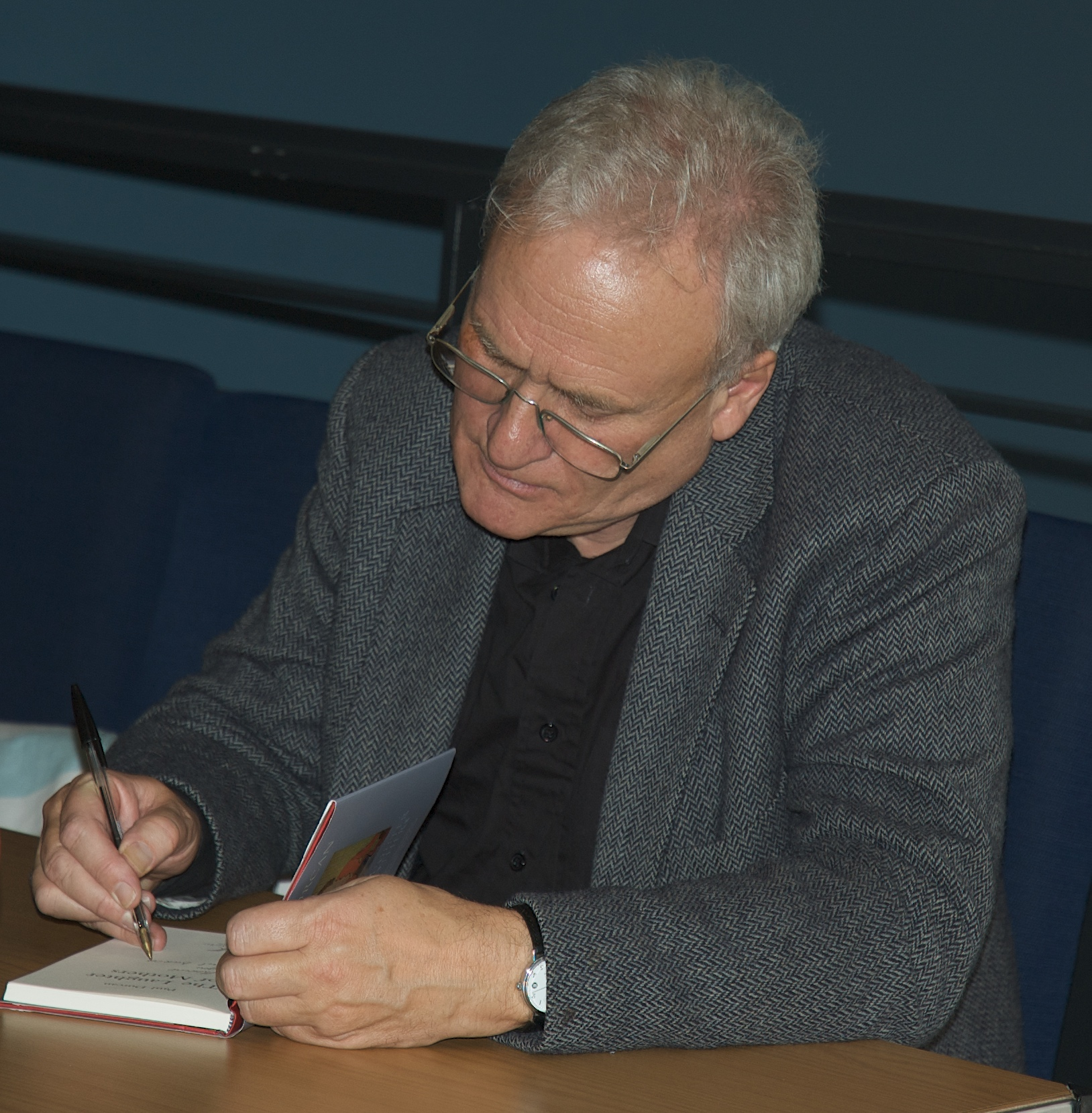
Paul Durcan

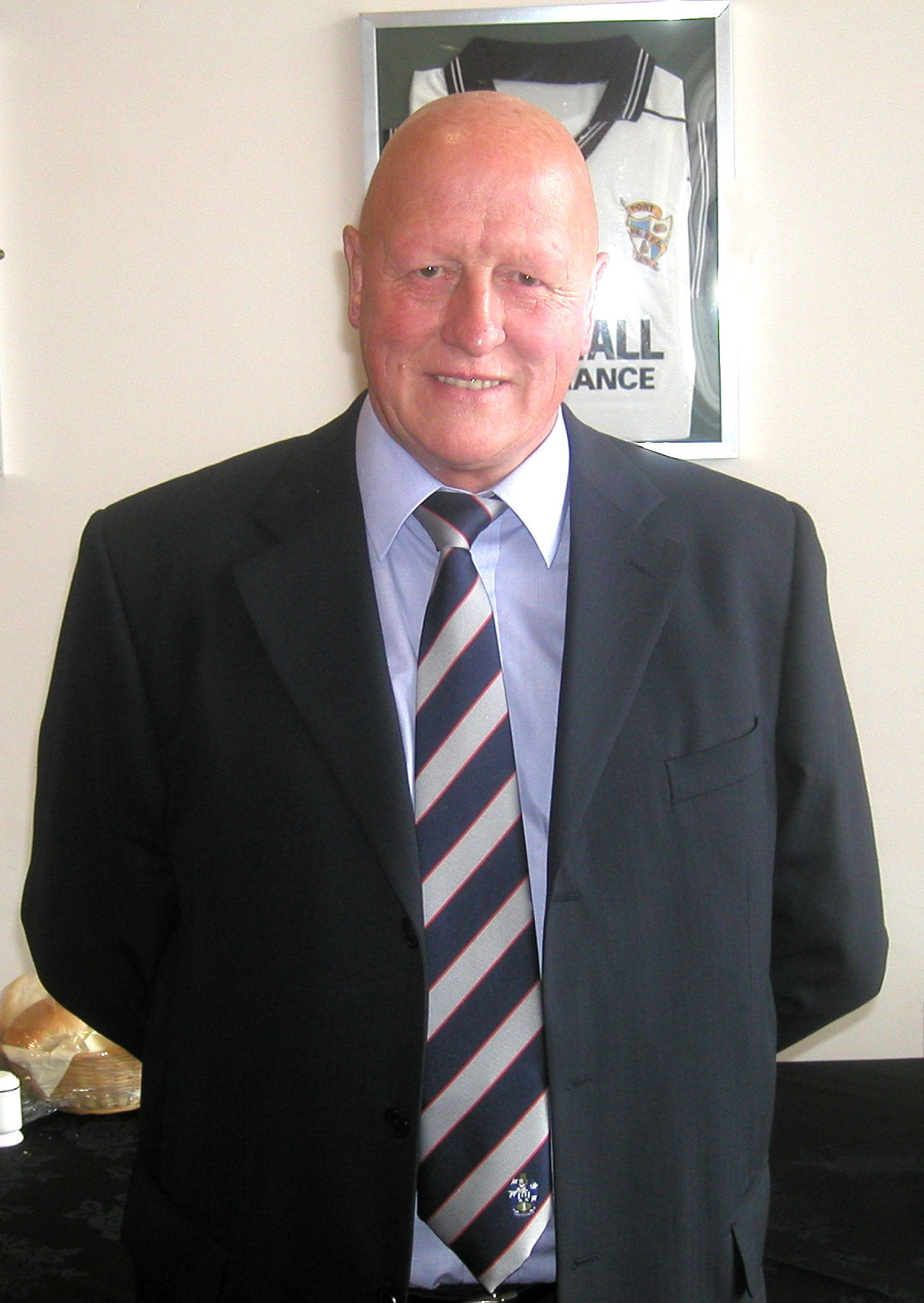
Gerry Murphy

- 9 May – Peter Morwood, 68, novelist and screenwriter. Born in Northern Ireland.
- 11 May – Paddy O'Toole, 87, politician, TD (1977–1987), senator (1973–1977 & 1987) and Minister for Defence (1986–1987).
- 13 May – Alice Hanratty, 86, artist.
- 17 May – Paul Durcan, 80, poet.
- 23 May – Gerry Murphy, 81, football manager (Huddersfield Town).
- 25 May – Kenneth Nicholls, 90, academic and historian.
- 26 May – Oliver Kilmurray, 78, Gaelic footballer (Daingean, Offaly senior team). Death announced on this date.
- 31 May – Carmencita Hederman, 85, politician, Lord Mayor of Dublin (1987–1988) and senator (1989–1993).

=== June ===
- 10 June – Paschal Long, 75, hurling referee.
- 11 June – Liam Fitzgerald, 75, politician, TD (1981–1982 and 1982–1997) and senator (1997–2007).
- 15 June – Patrick Ryan, 95, defrocked Roman Catholic priest and arms supplier.
- 18 June – Henry Mountcharles, 74, aristocrat, custodian of Slane Castle.
- 20 June – Kevin Prendergast, 92, racehorse trainer.
- 29 June – Seán Rice, 83, Gaelic footballer and hurler (Éire Óg, Antrim senior teams). Born in Northern Ireland.

=== July ===
- 2 July – Kevin Crowley, 90, Capuchin friar.
- 3 July – Mickey MacConnell, 78, singer-songwriter and journalist.
- 7 July – Seán Doherty, 78, Gaelic footballer (Ballyboden St Enda's, Dublin senior team).
- 14 July – Avril MacRory, 69, television producer and director.
- 17 July – Tommy Gallagher, 82, politician, MLA (1998–2011). (death announced on this date)
- 23 July – Maeve Kyle, 96, Olympic track athlete (1956, 1960, and 1964) and hockey player.
- 25 July – Colm Mulholland, 96, Gaelic footballer (Lavey, Derry senior team).
- 27 July
  - Mick Kearin, 82, footballer (Bohemians, Shamrock Rovers, national team).
  - Edward O'Grady, 75, racehorse trainer.
- 28 July – Seán Sheehy, 73, footballer (Dundalk, Bohemians, Shelbourne) and manager (Thurles Town).
- 29 July – Cecil Pringle, 81, Anglican priest.
- 31 July – Seán Rocks, 63, broadcaster and actor.

=== August ===
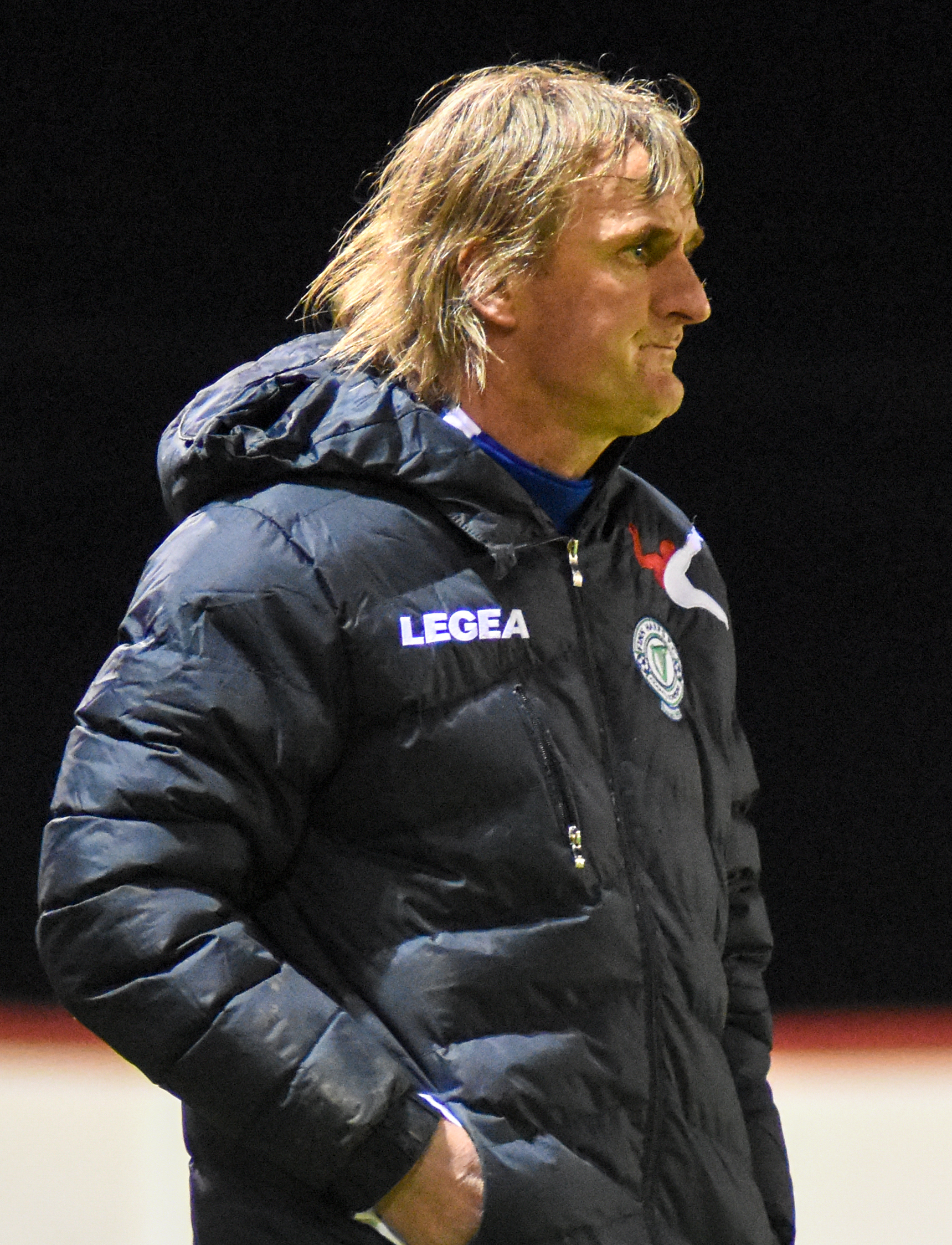
Ollie Horgan

- 1 August – Frank Grimes, 78, actor.
- 3 August – Hilary Weston, 83, fashion industry executive (Selfridges) and politician, lieutenant governor of Ontario (1997–2002).
- 4 August
  - Don Connellan, 51, Gaelic footballer (Roscommon senior team) and manager (Moycullen).
  - George Morrison, 102, documentary film director.
- 7 August – Tony Hadden, 89, Gaelic footballer (Newry Shamrocks, Down senior team, Ulster). Born in Northern Ireland.
- 17 August – Derry O'Sullivan, 81, poet. Death announced on this date.
- 18 August – Oliver Galligan, 76, Gaelic footballer (Cavan Gaels, Cavan senior team) and administrator.
- 23 August – Peter Doyle, 79, Olympic road racing cyclist (1968, 1972).
- 28 August – Ollie Horgan, 57, football manager (Finn Harps).

=== September ===
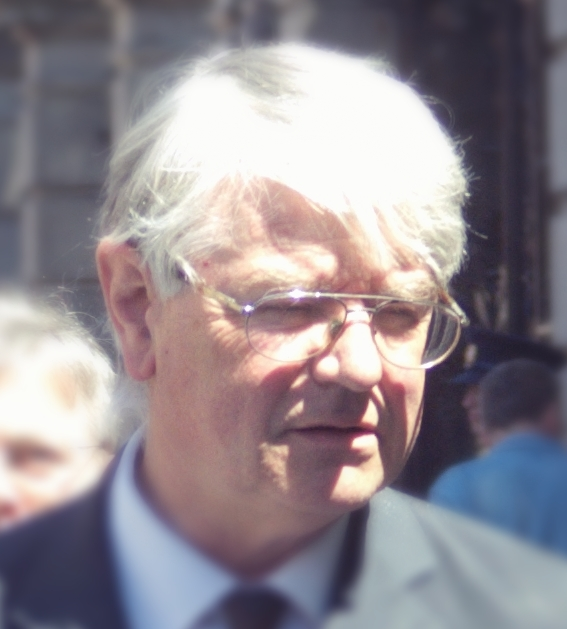
Martin Mansergh

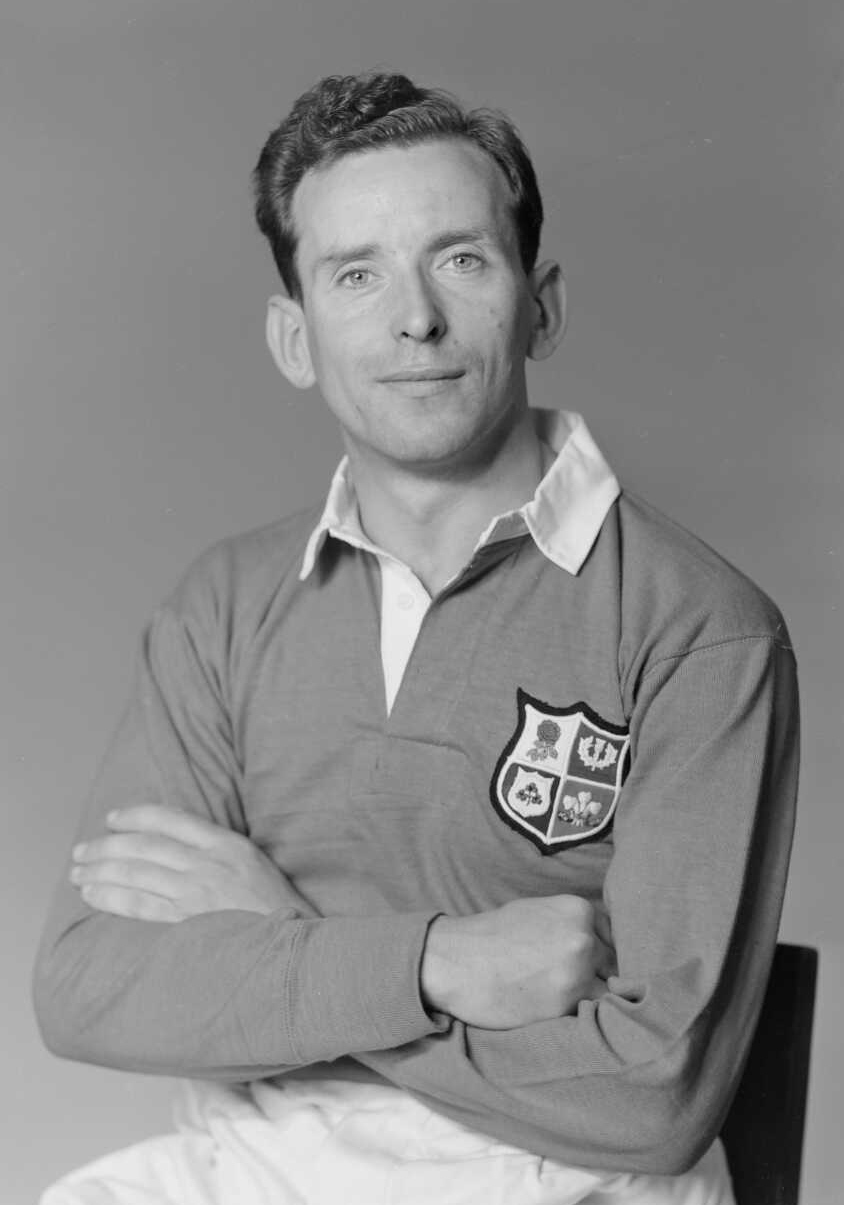
Mick Lane

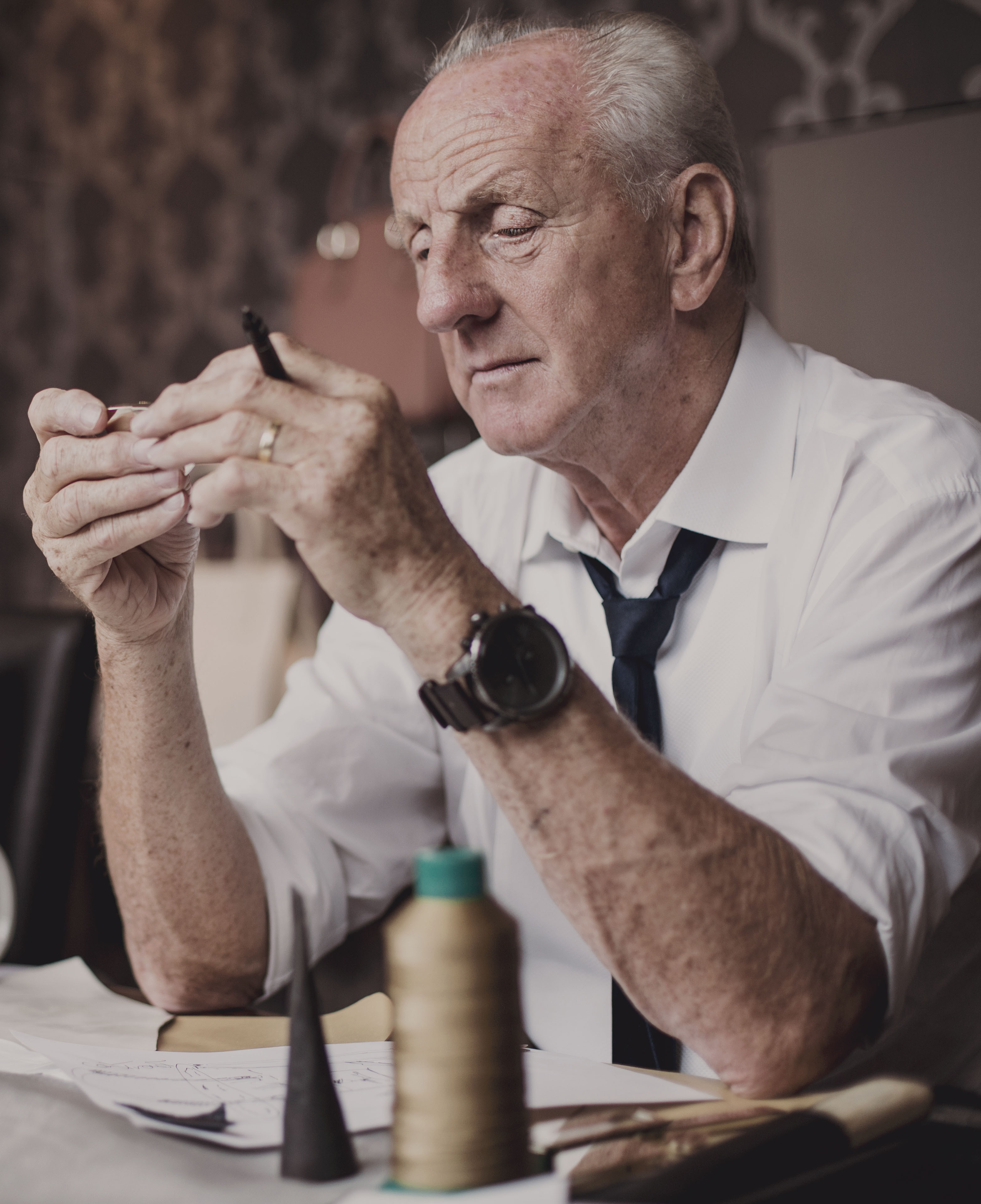
Paul Costelloe

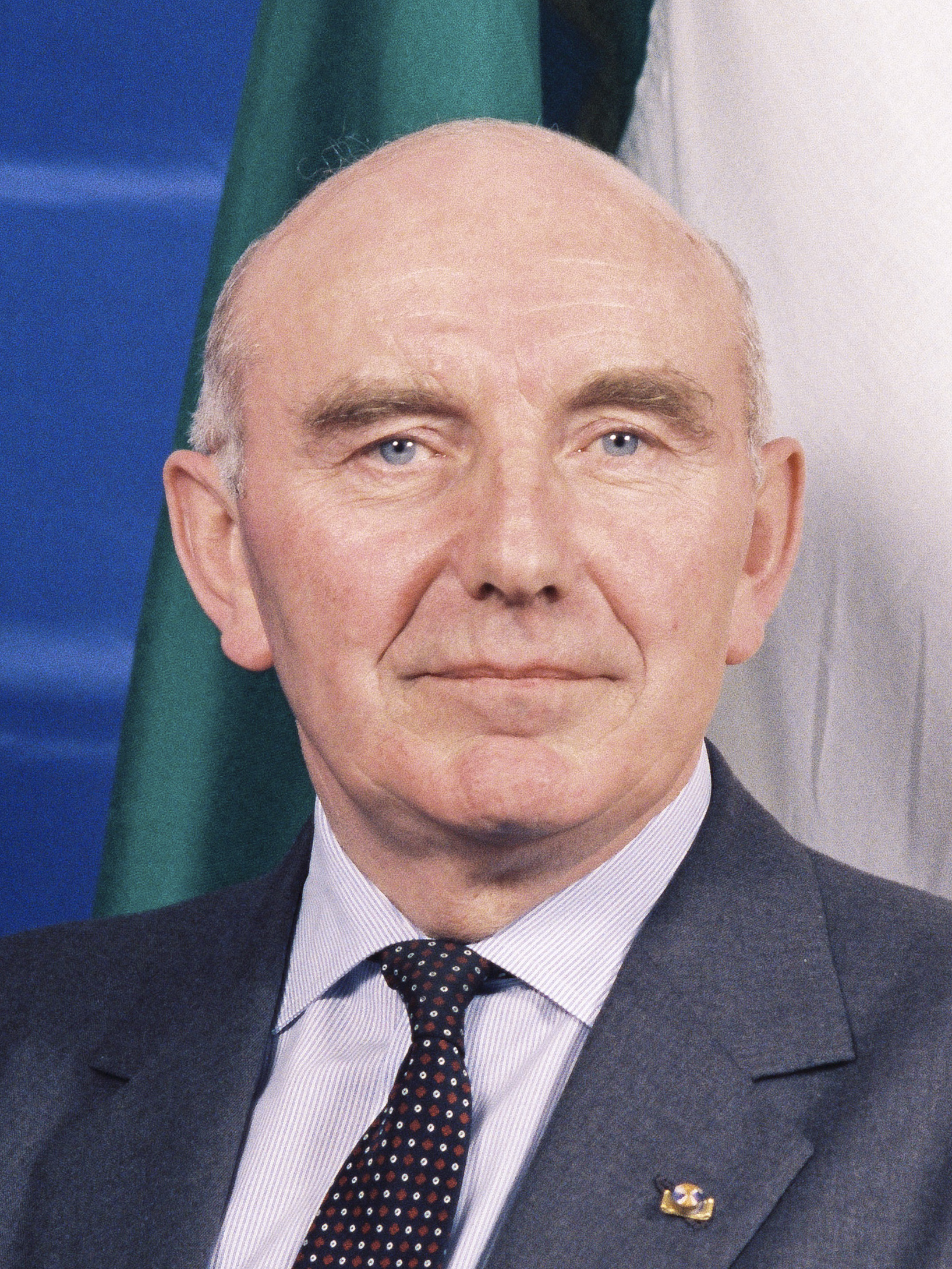
Paddy Cooney

- 1 September – Seán McLoughlin, 89, hurler (Thurles Sarsfields, Tipperary senior team, Munster).
- 5 September – Derry Power, 90, actor (Educating Rita, Far and Away).
- 6 September
  - Noel Mullaney, 88, Gaelic footballer (Sooey, Shamrock Gaels, Sligo senior team, Connacht).
  - Denis Murphy, 86, hurler (St Finbarr's, Cork senior team, Munster).
- 11 September
  - Jim Doolan, 95, academic and politician, senator (1980–1981).
  - Conor Gearty, 67, legal scholar.
  - Nicky Ryan, 79, music producer.
- 16 September – Jimmy Fay, Gaelic footballer (Trim, Meath senior team).
- 19 September – Paddy Carolan, 96, Gaelic footballer (Cúchulainns, Cavan senior team).
- 26 September
  - Michèle Burke, 75, makeup artist (Quest for Fire, Bram Stoker's Dracula), two-time Oscar winner.
  - Martin Mansergh, 78, civil servant and politician, senator (2002–2007), TD (2007–2011) and Minister State (2008–2011).
- 27 September – Keith Gorman, 46, Gaelic footballer (O'Dwyers, Newtown Blues, Dublin senior team).

=== October ===
- 1 October – Hughie McElvaney, 76, politician, councillor (1974–2024).
- 2 October – Manchán Magan, 55, author, traveller, broadcaster and documentary maker.
- 5 October – Frank Evers, 91, Gaelic footballer (Menlough, Galway senior team, Connacht).
- 8 October – Dinny Lowry, 90, footballer (St Patrick's Athletic, Bohemians, national team).
- 11 October – Tom O'Dea, 76, footballer (Shamrock Rovers, Hartford Bicentennials). (death announced on this death)
- 17 October – Ed Moloney, 77, journalist.
- 18 October – Philly Ryan, 56, Gaelic footballer (Clonmel Commercials, Tipperary senior team) and manager (Tipperary senior team).
- 21 October – Michael Calnan, politician, senator (1993–1997).
- 23 October – John McKenna, 87, hurler (Burgess, Borrisokane, Tipperary senior team, Munster).
- 28 October – May McGee, 81, winner of a historic privacy and contraception case in the Supreme Court in 1973.

=== November ===
- 3 November
  - Stanislaus Kennedy, 86, nun, social activist.
  - Eugene Hughes, 67, Gaelic footballer.
- 8 November – Barry McGann, 77, rugby union player (Cork Constitution, national team).
- 9 November – Mick Lane, 99, rugby union player (University College Cork, Munster, national team).
- 11 November – Geraldine O'Grady, 93, violinist.
- 21 November
  - David Hanly, 82, broadcaster.
  - Paul Costelloe, 80, fashion designer.
- 23 November – Margaretta D'Arcy, 91, author, actress, activist.
- 25 November – Donal Carey, 88, politician, senator (1981–1982), TD (1982–2002) and Minister of State (1995–1997).
- 29 November – Michael Greenan, Gaelic footballer (Drumalee, Cavan senior team), referee and president of Ulster GAA.
- 30 November – Michael McLoone, 80, Gaelic footballer (St Joseph's, Donegal senior team, Ulster), Team of the Millennium member and public servant.

=== December ===
- 1 December – Hugh Wallace, 68, architect and television presenter.
- 6 December – Paddy Cooney, 94, politician, TD (1970–1977 and 1981–1989), senator (1973–1977), MEP (1989–1995) and Minister for Justice (1973–1977).
- 8 December – Eamon Melaugh, 82, civil rights campaigner.
- 18 December – Máirín Quill, 89, politician, TD (1987–1997) and senator (1997–2002).
- 21 December – Anne Madden, 93, artist. Born in England.
- 24 December – Tony McKenna, 86, politician, senator (1987–1993).
- 30 December – David Heap, 76, actor (Fair City, Father Ted). Born in England.
