= Seán Rocks =

Irish broadcaster and actor (1961–2025)

Seán Rocks (8 June 1961 – 30 July 2025) was an Irish broadcaster and actor.

== Life and career ==
Rocks was born 8 June 1961 in Monaghan, and began presenting on RTÉ lyric fm in 2000. He became a regular on RTÉ radio and television throughout the 2000s and 2010s.

Rocks died on 30 July 2025, at the age of 64. President Michael D. Higgins issued a statement following his death.
