= GAA Palestine =

Sports organisation

Palestine GAA
- Irish: An Phalaistín
- Founded: 2024; 2 years ago
- County colours: Red; White; Green
- Website: gaapalestine.com

Clubs
- Total: 1

GAA Palestine is the organisation responsible for the promotion and playing of the Gaelic games in Palestine. As of February 2025, the only club in the region was the Moataz Sarsour GAA Club in Ramallah.

== History ==
In January 2024, Irishman Stephen Redmond travelled to the West Bank and launched a campaign to raise funds for and set up GAA Palestine, in order to bring the Gaelic games (particularly Gaelic football and hurling) to young people in the Ramallah area. £1,960 was raised to purchase equipment. Several other groups, such as Irish Sports for Palestine and Gaels against Genocide helped to connect the club with resources and people in Ireland to help set up the project. The original club, formerly Ramallah Hurling Club, was renamed to Moataz Sarsour GAA Club in honour of one of the club's volunteers, who was shot by Israeli forces and later pronounced dead in August 2024.

Later, in February 2025, the Tulkarm Governorate made a commitment to GAA Palestine to construct a Gaelic Athletic Association (GAA) pitch for the community, and sourced local manufacturers in the West Bank to produce hurleys. At that time, this was one of three planned GAA clubs within the West Bank, with others proposed for Al Khalil and Bethlehem.

While, as of May 2025, a "summer tour" of juvenile players to Ireland was proposed, by July 2025 the required visas had not been approved by the Department of Justice, Home Affairs and Migration.

In early 2026, David Hickey, a three-time All-Ireland winner with Dublin, donated the jersey he wore in Dublin's victory in the 1976 All-Ireland Senior Football Championship Final, along with his winners' medal and All-Star Award from that year, to GAA Palestine in support of the organisation's efforts to develop Gaelic football and hurling in Palestine.
