= Oliver Galligan =

Irish Gaelic footballer and Gaelic games administrator (1949–2025

Personal information
- Native name: Oilibhéar Ó Gealagáin (Irish)
- Born: 1949 Cavan, Ireland
- Died: 18 August 2025 (aged 76) Cavan, Ireland
- Occupation: Draughtsman
- Height: 5 ft 9 in (175 cm)

Sport
- Sport: Gaelic football
- Position: Centre-back
Club
- Years: Club
- Cavan Gaels
Club titles
- Cavan titles: 3
Inter-county
- Years: County
- 1969–1973: Cavan
Inter-county titles
- Ulster titles: 0
- All-Irelands: 0
- NFL: 0
- All Stars: 0

Oliver Galligan (1949 – 18 August 2025) was an Irish Gaelic footballer and Gaelic games administrator. At club level, he played with Cavan Gaels and at inter-county level with the Cavan senior football team. Galligan later served as president of the Ulster Council.

== Playing career ==
Galligan first played Gaelic football at club level with Cavan Gaels. He won a Cavan MFC medal as team captain in 1967, before later winning Cavan SFC medals in 1975, 1977 and 1978. Galligan also lined out with Cavan at inter-county level. After beginning as a member of the minor team in 1967, he progressed to under-21 level and was part of the senior team between 1969 and 1973.

== Administrative career ==
Galligan began his administrative career when he served as chairman of the Cavan Gaels club. He was first elected to the Cavan County Board in 1995, before becoming Cavan's delegate to the Ulster Council in 2001. Galligan served in a number of roles with the provincial council, including PRO, treasurer, vice-president and president from 2019 to 2022.

== Death ==
Galligan died on 18 August 2025, at the age of 76.

== Honours ==
Cavan Gaels

- Cavan Senior Football Championship: 1975, 1977, 1978
- Cavan Minor Football Championship: 1967 (c)
