= Bray Air Display =

Annual aerobatic display in Ireland

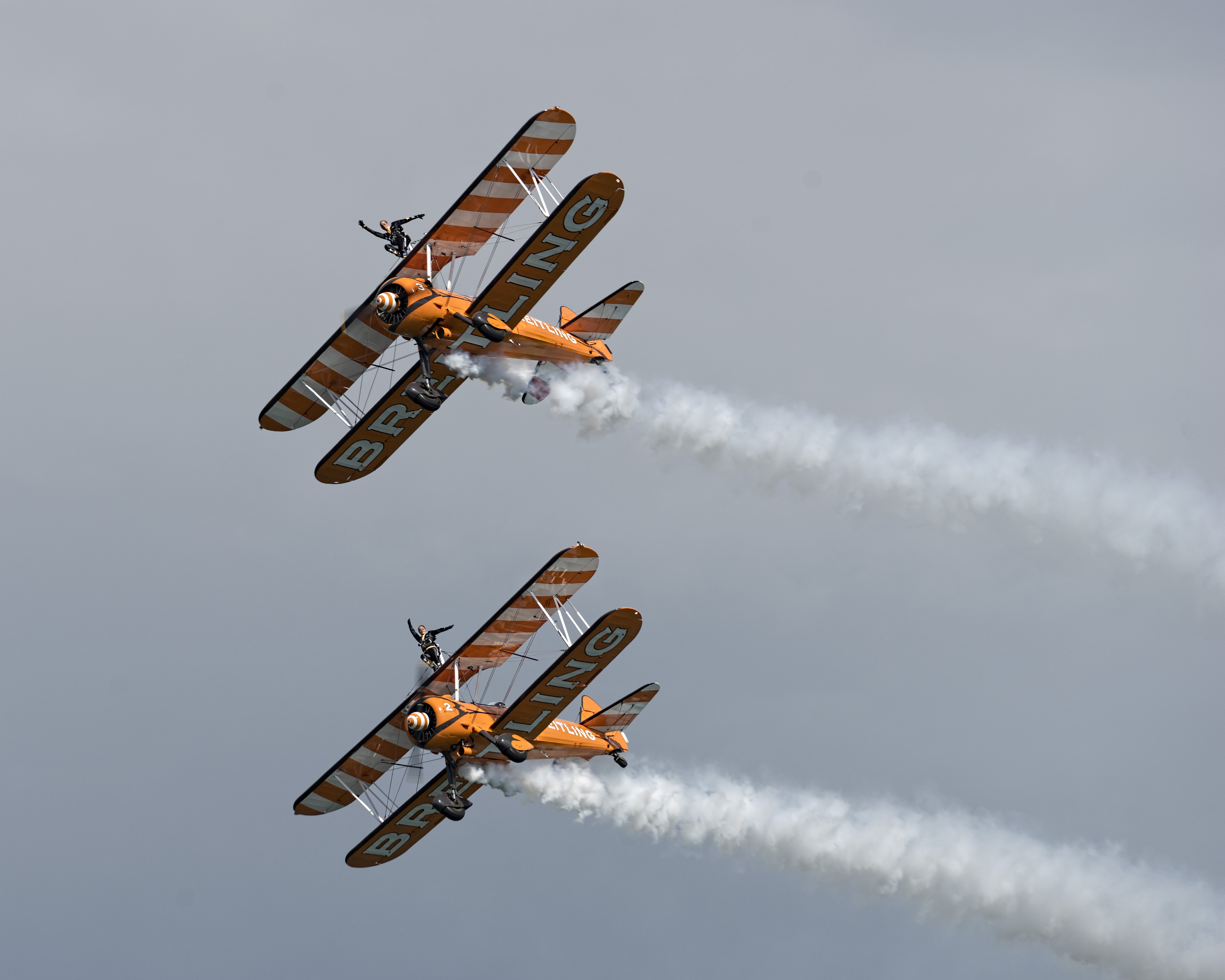
Breitling Wingwalkers at the 2018 Bray Air Display

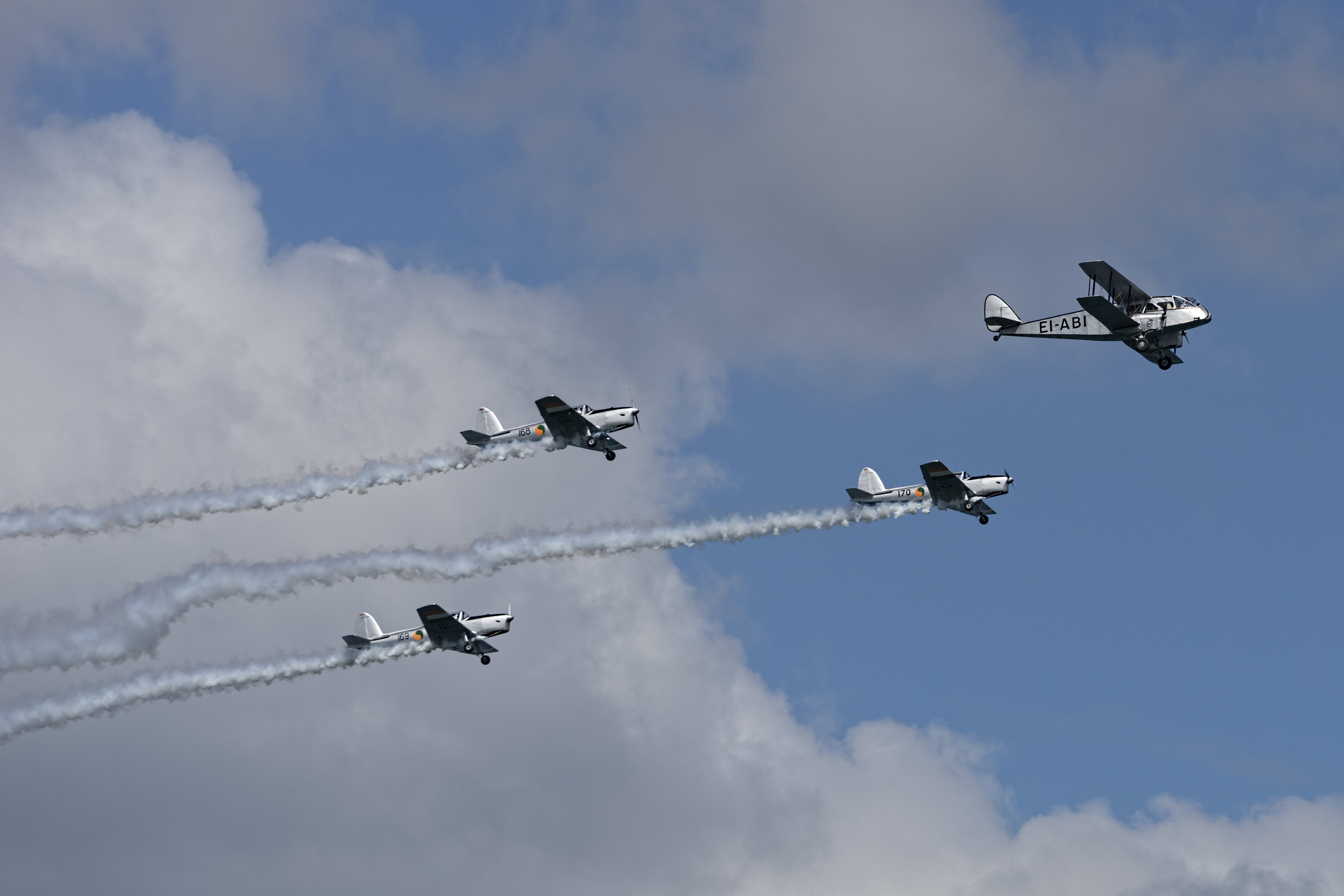
Flight of historic Irish aircraft at 2018 event

The Bray Air Display, also sometimes known as the Bray Air Show, is an air show which takes place in the seaside town of Bray, County Wicklow in Ireland. It typically takes place on a weekend in mid or late July or early August. The event has been held annually since its inception in 2005, except when it was cancelled in 2020 and 2021 due to the COVID-19 pandemic. It is held on the Bray Seafront, with planes flying over the Irish Sea, flanked by Bray Head to the south. The show is part of the town's Summerfest, with amusements and food and drink stands on the Seafront.

The show lasts about two and a half hours, and has included shows on both the Saturday and Sunday of the airshow weekend. The 2025 event, however, was scheduled for the Saturday, only.

The event is free of charge and was attended by over 140,000 people in 2018, according to organisers. Tickets can, however, be bought for a private area, known as the "Flight Deck", which includes a private barbecue and a bar, with free parking. Tickets were €120 per person in 2022.

Past participants have included a US military Boeing C-17 Globemaster III, the Royal Air Force Red Arrows, Patrouille Suisse, the Royal Jordanian Falcons, and the Black Knights parachute team. Flag carrier airline Aer Lingus usually also performs a flypast at the event.

The 2023 show took place on Saturday 29 and Sunday 30 July 2023. The 2025 event took place Saturday 2 August in front of 40,000 spectators.

== Attending the event ==
Attendees are encouraged to use public transport as the event due to the extreme popularity of the event, although parking is provided. Bray is served by several bus routes, as well as the Iarnród Éireann DART service. Road closures are often in place throughout the town over the weekend.

=== DART incident at 2022 show ===
The 2022 event took place on 24 July, the same day as the 2022 All-Ireland Senior Football Championship Final in Croke Park, a stadium with a capacity of over 80,000. This caused trains to be exceptionally busy. According to the Irish Examiner, at around 3pm, passengers "between Dalkey and Bray 'forced doors open' [after the train] stopped to 'await a clear platform at Bray". Some passengers reportedly experienced "panic attacks" due to there being "no air conditioning", with "families seen walking along the tracks towards Bray station". The line was closed between Dalkey and Bray, before being reopened at around 5.15pm.
