= Fiona McHugh =

Irish journalist, editor and restaurateur (1968 – 2025)

Fiona McHugh (1968 – 12 March 2025) was an Irish journalist and editor, and the first woman to be appointed editor of the Irish edition of The Sunday Times. She later co-founded two high-end deli stores and other hospitality operations.

== Career ==
Educated at University College Dublin, where she studied English and philosophy. As a journalist, she worked for The Economist, Bloomberg, and Reuters, before succeeding Rory Godson as editor of the Irish edition of The Sunday Times in 2000, making her one of the first female newspaper editors-in-chief in Ireland.

She held this position until 2005, when, alongside her husband, property developer Paul Byrne, she founded Fallon & Byrne, the high-end food store on Exchequer Street in Dublin. In 2017, they opened another branch in Rathmines, which included a restaurant. The Rathmines branch was closed in January 2020, and they sold Fallon & Byrne in early 2020. McHugh and her husband owned and ran Lenehans Bar and Grill, in Rathmines.

McHugh died from cancer in a hospice in Harold's Cross, Dublin, on 12 March 2025, at the age of 57.
