= Patrick Dineen =

Irish cricketer (1938–2025)

- Born: 13 May 1938; Cork, Ireland
- Died: 20 March 2025 (aged 86); Blackrock, Cork, Ireland
- Education: St. Joseph's NS Mardyke Presentation Brothers College Cork
- Occupation: Businessman
- Known for: Businessman and cricketer

Patrick Dineen
Cricket information
- Batting: Left-handed

International information
- National side: Ireland

Career statistics
Competition	First-class
Matches	7
Runs scored	179
Batting average	17.90
100s/50s	0/1
Top score	84
Catches/stumpings	3/–
- Source: CricketArchive, 10 October 2022

Patrick Joseph Dineen (13 May 1938 – 20 March 2025) was an Irish cricketer and businessman. From Cork, he was educated at St Joseph's NS Mardyke and Presentation Brothers College. After his Leaving Certificate, he went to work first for Norwich Union and then for Standard Life. Married with three children, he was a keen golfer. When asked about his wealth by an Irish Times journalist he replied famously: "All I need is a new golf swing".

== Background ==
Dineen was born in Cork, Ireland, on 13 May 1938. He died on 20 March 2025, at the age of 87. He was survived by his wife Colette, sons Peter and Roger, and daughter Linda.

== Sports career ==
A left-handed batsman, Dineen made his first-class cricket debut for the Ireland cricket team in August 1962 against the Combined Services. He went on to play for Ireland on 23 occasions, his last match coming against the MCC at Lord's in July 1973.

Of his matches for Ireland, seven had first-class status. In all matches for Ireland, he scored 621 runs at an average of 19.41. His top score was 84 against Scotland in August 1968. He also played one match for the MCC, against Scotland in July 1972. As of 2014, he is the most capped Cork County player and was a member of the Irish side which famously bowled out the West Indies for 25 at Sion Mills on 2 July 1969.

Dineen also played rugby for Dolphin in Cork and League of Ireland soccer for Cork United while still at school.

== Business career ==
In 1965, Dineen established his own life and pensions company in Cork, selling 40 per cent of the company to Charterhouse. This stake was subsequently acquired by Sedgwick a year later and the company became Sedgwick Dineen. He sold his stake in the company, which was valued at over £10 million, in 1994.

Dineen's business career included involvement with a succession of Irish state firms. He chaired Bord Gáis from 1984 to 1989 where he oversaw the acquisition of the town gas companies throughout the State and the construction of the Kinsale Head gas field and pipeline. While at Bord Gáis, Dineen came up with the idea for a public park on the site of the company's disused and historic gasometers. Shalom Park opened in 1989.

Dineen also chaired Irish Steel, joining the company as executive chairman in 1993. Irish Steel had accumulated losses of £118 million since 1979. It lost another £10 million in the following year and Dineen was appointed by the Minister for Enterprise and Employment, Ruairi Quinn, to rescue the plant. The company was ultimately sold to an Indian firm, Ispat, in 1994, but only just. "We had come within eight hours of closure. I had accepted the fact that it was going to happen," Dineen said in an interview to the Irish Times. "It would have been very difficult if we had closed the place down . . . We got the company into profit. We went looking for a buyer and found Ispat."

His final stint with a state company saw him head up Bord na Móna where he faced controversy over the pay and expenses of CEO, Eddie O'Connor – and O'Connor's subsequent exit.

Dineen was also a member of the Housing Finance Agency from 8 February 1982 to 31 December 1986.
