= Cecil Pringle =

Irish Anglican priest (1943–2025)

Cecil Thomas Pringle (1943 – 29 July 2025) was an Irish Anglican priest who served as Archdeacon of Clogher from 1989 to 2014.

== Biography ==
Pringle was born near Clones, County Monaghan in 1943; educated at Trinity College, Dublin and the Church of Ireland Theological College; and ordained in 1967. After a curacy in Belfast he held incumbencies at Cleenish and Rossorry. On his retirement, Bishop John McDowell said

‘Cecil Pringle has an unparallelled knowledge of the Diocese of Clogher and has brought all of his skills, enthusiasm and dedication to bear during his period of service as Archdeacon'.

Pringle died on 29 July 2025.
