= Paschal Long =

Irish hurling referee (1950–2025)

Paschal R. Long (1950 – 10 June 2025) was an Irish hurling referee, selector and player.

== Life and career ==
Born in Stoneyford, County Kilkenny, Long played hurling at junior level as a goalkeeper with the Carrickshock club. In retirement from playing, he served as a selector. Long also had a 16-year career as a referee. During that time he took charge of 32 finals, including the 1984 All-Ireland SHC final between Cork and Offaly. At club level, Long refereed six Kilkenny SHC finals, Kilkenny IHC finals, five Kilkenny SHC finals and a host of other junior and minor finals.

Long died on 10 June 2025, at the age of 75.
