= Murder of Tina Satchwell =

2017 disappearance and murder of an Irish woman in Youghal, County Cork

Tina Satchwell
- Born: 30 November 1972
- Died: c. 20 March 2017 (aged 44); Youghal, County Cork, Ireland
- Body discovered: 12 October 2023
- Other name: Tina Dingivan
- Height: 5 ft 7 in (1.70 m)
- Spouse: Richard Satchwell

Tina Satchwell (born Dingivan; 30 November 1972 – c. 20 March 2017) was an Irish woman who disappeared in mysterious circumstances in March 2017. In October 2023, her remains were found, wrapped in black plastic sheets beneath a one-metre thick layer of concrete, under the stairs of her home in the seaside town of Youghal.

Satchwell's husband Richard, an Englishman, was later arrested and charged with her murder. On 30 May 2025, the trial of Richard Satchwell ended with his conviction for murder. He was sentenced to life imprisonment on 4 June 2025.

== Background ==
Tina Dingivan was from St Bernard's Place in Fermoy, County Cork. In the 1980s she moved to Coalville outside of Leicester, England, to live with her grandmother. There she met Richard Satchwell (born 16 June 1966), and, in 1990, they married in Oldham. The couple later moved back to Ireland, and settled in Fermoy.

In November 2001, Richard Satchwell was sentenced to seven days in prison for larceny and three days in prison for fraudulent use of a motor tax disc at Fermoy District Court, as well as being disqualified from driving for one year for driving without insurance. In December 2002, he was sentenced to a month in prison after being found guilty of social welfare fraud. In 2016, the couple moved to Grattan Street in the seaside town of Youghal, where they lived with their two dogs.

== Disappearance ==
Tina Satchwell was last seen alive in public on Sunday 19 March 2017, with her husband, at a car boot sale in the town of Carrigtwohill. On 24 March 2017, Richard Satchwell went to Fermoy Garda station around 7 pm and reported that Tina had gone missing from their home in Youghal. He claimed that the last time he had spoken to her was four days previously on the morning of Monday 20 March 2017: at 10:30 am that day, he drove to Aldi (which was 30 kilometres away) in Dungarvan to buy fish at Tina's request; when he returned to their house at around noon, Tina was gone and he had not heard from her since.

Satchwell said his wife had been depressed and was troubled by family disputes. He claimed that she had chosen to leave "to get her head straight". He later added that she might have gone to live with family in the UK with the help of a third party; however, the Dingivan family rejected this idea. Satchwell stated that his wife had taken €26,000 in cash, the proceeds of the sale of a house, in two suitcases now missing from the house. The police said that Tina had not passed through any Irish or UK port or airport and that they believed she had not left Ireland. She did not possess a passport and her identification documents were not missing. Her phone has not been used, nor had her bank account been accessed since the day she disappeared.

== Missing person investigations ==
On 7 June 2017, Gardaí conducted a technical examination of the couple's house on Grattan Street; however, nothing of evidential value was discovered. On 19 August 2017, the Garda water unit assisted by the Irish Coast Guard conducted search operations in Youghal harbour at low tide. In March 2018, Garda Síochána carried out a search in Mitchel's Wood near Castlemartyr in County Cork, 20 minutes from Youghal. The operation was based on a tip from a member of the public who claimed to have seen a blonde haired woman matching Tina's description enter the woods with another person on the night she had disappeared, but that this person thereafter left the woods alone without the blonde woman. A no-fly zone was established over the area. Despite an extensive search, which included the use of detection dogs, no trace of Satchwell was found. Searches were also carried out in scrubland and off the quays in Youghal, but nothing was discovered. Gardaí also engaged with Interpol.

== Media coverage ==
Satchwell's sudden disappearance attracted significant media attention in Ireland, with Satchwell making frequent appeals for information and granting interviews he claimed were intended to generate publicity for her case. Satchwell would later accuse the Irish print media of quoting his words out of context in an effort to create misleading stories, and eventually turned down all requests for newspaper articles in favour of live television or radio interviews, in an attempt to prevent his words, as he said, being "twisted".

=== RTÉ programming ===
In June 2017, Satchwell appeared alongside Tina's aunt, Margaret Maher, on the RTÉ television programme Crimecall to make a public appeal for information about Satchwell's disappearance. Satchwell later claimed that this appeal generated thousands of phone calls to Gardaí; however, he did not think the authorities "got anything concrete" on Tina's whereabouts. The following month, in response to social media speculation that he was involved in her disappearance, Satchwell stated that Gardaí had recently searched the Grattan Street house without his knowledge, that nothing incriminating had been found and that he would be willing to take a lie detector test to prove his innocence. In January 2018, RTÉ Television aired a Prime Time special programme on Tina's disappearance, featuring Satchwell, Tina's cousin Sarah Howard, and Gardaí involved in the case.

=== Ray D'Arcy interview ===
On 11 March 2018, Satchwell appeared on The Ray D'Arcy Show on RTÉ Television to discuss Tina's disappearance. During the interview, Satchwell further claimed that €26,000 in cash that he claimed went missing from their house came from the sale of their former home in Fermoy, and claimed it had not been deposited in a bank account as he was receiving unemployment benefit at the time and depositing it would have affected his eligibility to receive social welfare payments. When D'Arcy asked Satchwell why he thought there was speculation that he was involved in Tina's disappearance, he said the husband would be the primary suspect in the majority of missing persons' cases. Satchwell reiterated his claim that Tina was alive, and suggested a man had recently come forward to say he had spoken to a woman who resembled Tina, walking a dog on a beach a few months previously in County Dublin, and who said she was renting accommodation in the area. The man, Satchwell claimed, had approached this woman, concerned for her wellbeing and that she was underdressed for the extremely cold January weather, and, Satchwell claimed, she informed him that she was "just walking a new puppy" she had bought.

=== Neil Prendeville interview ===
On 12 March 2018, Satchwell was interviewed by Neil Prendeville on Cork's Red FM regarding Tina's disappearance. Satchwell reiterated his claim that Tina was alive and had left to deal with personal problems. Satchwell also claimed that, a few months before his wife vanished, she had asked him for his UK National Insurance number, which, he said, reinforced his belief that she was living with friends or relatives in England. When asked by Prendeville why he did not think to enquire with Tina's best friend about her location in the days before he officially reported her as missing to the police, Satchwell replied that he did not have her phone number and that it was not saved on Tina's phone either. When challenged that it was strange she did not save her best friend's number on her phone, Satchwell claimed they met up daily, always at the same place, when they had lived in Fermoy, so it was unnecessary to pre-arrange any meetups by phone. Regarding continuing speculation that he was involved in her disappearance, Prendeville offered Satchwell the chance to take a lie detector test live on air; however, Satchwell rejected the offer, claiming to be "feeling tired and unwell".

== Murder investigation ==
In July 2023, a team of detectives from Cork began reviewing witness statements previously provided by a person of interest and found major discrepancies between what he had stated and what Garda inquiries had subsequently ascertained. The suspect's mobile phone activity and email records in the days and weeks following his wife's disappearance were likewise analysed in detail. Gardaí subsequently discovered that, while the suspect had claimed he was not in County Cork on the morning Tina vanished, mobile device forensics proved this to be untrue. While reviewing the case file, investigating officers also noticed a new brick wall had been built to block off the underside of a stairwell when comparing pictures of the house at Grattan Street taken before and after her disappearance. According to some media reports, in early October 2023, utility workers attempting to clear a blocked drain of the terraced house next door to Satchwell's found suspicious material, which was then reported to Gardaí

On 10 October 2023, Satchwell's disappearance was upgraded to a murder investigation. Satchwell was arrested on suspicion of murder and taken to a Garda station in Cork for questioning. A Garda team was brought in to search a premises in Youghal, County Cork. On 11 October 2023, the suspect was released without charge. The suspect was re-arrested the next day following the discovery of human remains at the Satchwell house. A cadaver dog had indicated the stairwell area of the Grattan Street house to Gardaí, who, after knocking down the wall and digging down through a one-metre thick layer of concrete, discovered the dead body of a woman wrapped in black plastic sheets. On 13 October 2023, the remains were identified through dental records and confirmed to be those of Tina Satchwell. Later that day, Satchwell was charged with her murder. When arrested, he stated "guilty or not guilty – guilty".

== Trial of Richard Satchwell ==
=== Preliminaries ===
On 14 October 2023, the then 57-year-old Satchwell appeared before Cashel District Court and was remanded in custody in Limerick Prison to await trial. On 3 November 2023, Satchwell was denied bail, as Judge Siobhan Lankford considered him a flight risk. On 26 March 2024, Satchwell was served with the book of evidence at a sitting of Clonmel District Court. After ordering the release of video recordings of Garda interrogations to the defense team, Judge Brian O'Shea administered the alibi warning to Satchwell, informing him that if he intended to rely on an alibi during his trial he must notify the Director of Public Prosecutions in writing within the next 14 days.

Satchwell's trial for the murder of his wife was scheduled for late April 2025 at the Central Criminal Court. His barrister Brendan Grehan indicated that the defence would call a significant amount of witnesses evidence from persons the accused had "communicated with by way of interview and the media as well". In December 2024, Satchwell's legal team successfully applied to have the venue of his trial moved from Cork to Dublin.

=== Plea ===
On 28 April 2025, before Mr Justice Kerida Naidoo at the Central Criminal Court in Dublin, 57-year-old Satchwell entered a formal plea of not guilty to the murder of his wife. Justice Naidoo thereafter swore in a jury consisting of seven women and five men, warning them to deal with all upcoming evidence objectively in light of previous media coverage. The Director of Public Prosecutions was represented in court by prosecution counsel Geraldine Small SC, while Brendan Grehan SC headed the defence legal team.

=== Opening statements ===
Prosecution lawyer Gerardine Small SC narrated to the jury how in March 2017 Satchwell had originally told Gardaí in Fermoy that he believed Tina had left due to the breakdown of their relationship and that he was not overly concerned about her welfare. In May 2017, Satchwell made a number of detailed formal statements to Gardaí, describing how he returned from Dungarvan to an empty house on the day in question and noticed two suitcases and €26,000 in cash were also missing. Investigations later uncovered inconsistencies in Satchwell's statements, such as CCTV footage showing him collecting his social welfare payments from Youghal Post Office shortly after 11:10am on the day his wife disappeared, along with mobile phone location data proving he returned home straight afterwards and stayed there until 12:50pm. Analysis by a forensic accountant of the couple's savings and income streams found that they did not have the financial capacity to save €26,000 either.

Small SC then described to the jury how an invasive search was carried out at Satchwell house by Garda officers in October 2023, the result of which was the recovery of Tina Satchwell's decomposed body from a concrete covered shallow grave under the stairs, after which Satchwell was arrested on suspicion of her murder. During interviews, Satchwell claimed that, on the morning of 20 March 2017, Tina suddenly attacked him with a chisel, and that, while trying to fend off her attempted stabbing, he accidentally strangled her with the belt of her dressing gown wrapped around her neck. According to Satchwell, he then transferred her body to a chest freezer in their garden shed, before burying her a few days later wrapped in black plastic sheeting under the stairs of their house. Electronic forensic evidence showed Satchwell tried to give away for free the same freezer via an online marketplace later that month, and Satchwell was observed to be selling Tina's clothes and footwear at a car boot sale shortly after her disappearance.

=== Prosecution evidence ===
Garda James Butler testified to the court how on 11 May 2017 he recorded a statement from Satchwell for Tina's missing persons report. Satchwell claimed to Garda Butler that his wife could have had an "undiagnosed psychiatric condition", while in other statements to Gardaí he alleged that she would physically assault him several times a year during emotional outbursts. Detective Garda Aidan Dardis told the court how he took a statement from Satchwell about his movements on the morning Tina disappeared, and that Satchwell claimed to have left his house around 10am to collect his social welfare payments, then travelled to a pet shop to buy parrot food. Retired Garda Sergeant John Sharkey testified that Gardaí became concerned for Tina's welfare after no trace of her was found in the following months, and that, after coming to the belief that "something criminal" had occurred, he applied for, and was granted, a search warrant for the Satchwell house in Grattan Street.

On 17 June 2017, a team of 10 Garda officers conducted a thorough 12 hour search of the property, who as well as taking photographs of its various rooms also carried out forensic tests looking for blood spatters. Garda Cathal Whelan, who was tasked with photographing the interior of the house, described the property as cluttered and unkempt, remarking that dog faeces was observed on the floor. Garda Whelan also narrated to the court how he took photos of the interior of a storage space under the stairs, copies of which were then handed out to the jury. The stairs had caught Garda Whelan's attention, as they appeared to be made of new untreated and unpainted wood, while their side was likewise made of new unpainted plasterboard. In response to a question from defence counsel Brendan Grehan SC, Garda Whelan agreed that what looked like a new red brick wall was visible under the stairs in one of the images. Excerpts from several TV and radio interviews from the summer of 2017 were then played to the court, where Satchwell described returning from Dungarvan to find his wife had gone missing and reiterated his claim that Tina had gone away to take a break from their relationship. Footage of Satchwell, during an interview with Paul Byrne, denying that he had murdered his wife was also shown to the jury, along with a 2018 radio interview in which he claimed his wife had been suffering from depression since 2012.

Detective Sergeant David Noonan testified to the court how in June 2021 he interviewed Satchwell regarding his relationship with Tina, explaining that the session was recorded on video and a transcript was created afterwards. In the interview, Satchwell asserted that his wife was prone to emotional outbursts, and claimed that she had physically assaulted him on numerous occasions. On the day she disappeared, Satchwell claimed to have started doing household chores around 5:45am, then, he claimed, he had made Tina breakfast just before 9am. She allegedly asked him to go to Dungarvan to buy parrot food, and Satchwell headed out just after 10am. When he purportedly returned home shortly after 12 noon, Tina was not in the house and, supposedly, a sum of €26,000 was missing from a money box they had hidden in the attic room. Satchwell then waited four days before contacting the Dingivan family, but no one had any knowledge of her whereabouts. Satchwell claimed that a possible motive for her disappearance was to exact revenge for a previous incident when he claimed to have abruptly moved back to England for a short period in 2002.

Detective Garda Dave Kelleher described to the court how he examined laptops seized during the June 2017 search of the Satchwell house and recovered several emails to the "International Monkey Rescue Organisation", which detailed conversations regarding payments for the purchase of Marmoset monkeys. Hundreds of text messages were similarly recovered from a Samsung SMA300 phone regarding the attempted purchase of marmoset monkeys from the same organization. In response to questions from the defence team, Detective Garda Kelleher clarified that Satchwell had sent significant amounts of money over several years; however, despite demands for more money, the monkeys never arrived, and it appeared that Satchwell had, in fact, been the target of a scam. Forensic accountant Tadhg Twomey informed the court how the couple's joint bank account was constantly overdrawn in the years leading up to Tina's disappearance, and that thousands of dollars had also been moved through a Western Union account.

Detective Garda David Kelleher testified how he arrested Satchwell at his house on Grattan Street around 5 pm on 10 October 2023 on suspicion of murder, while also executing a search warrant on the same premises, and thereafter transported him to Cobh Garda station for questioning. In the presence of a solicitor, Satchwell again claimed he returned to an empty house on the day in question to find Tina had vanished and their cash savings were also missing. Gardaí interrogators challenged Satchwell that they had evidence that what he had been saying for many years was untrue. They showed Satchwell pictures of the storage area under the stairs, and informed him that they intended to dig up parts of the property. Satchwell was thereafter released without charge at 4:39pm on 11 October 2023.

Forensic Archaeologist Doctor Niamh McCullagh testified to the court how she led the search team at Satchwell's house, describing how the team worked from the top floor down using ground metal detectors and penetrating radar. The under stair storage had been inspected with penetrating radar without anything unusual being detected; however, a Detection dog had indicated interest in the bottom step. Search team member Garda Brian Barry's attention was drawn to the red brick wall along the bottom of the stairs due to its poor build quality, and he decided to visually check the storage area again. After lifting up the linoleum floor covering, he observed that new concrete (due to its different colour) had been poured in a specific six-foot long by three-foot wide area, and Garda Barry ordered the new concrete to be broken up with a jackhammer. After digging down approximately 64 centimetres, black plastic was discovered, and Gardaí decided to halt work until the next day.

The black plastic bundle containing the decomposed body, subsequently formally identified as Tina Satchwell, was later removed from the property and taken to Cork University Hospital's mortuary. The body had first been wrapped in a blanket before being covered in the plastic sheeting, and was clothed in tartan-style pyjamas and a dressing gown. Detective Garda Karen McCarthy told the court a wallet was found in the dressing gown pocket, which contained among other items Tina's Public Service Card. Doctor Laureen Buckley, who was present at the Satchwell house and at the subsequent post mortem examination conducted by State pathologist Doctor Margot Bolster, narrated to the court how Tina's body was found face down in the shallow grave under the stairs, and that her arms were crossed in front of her while her legs were folded back up over Tina's thighs. Doctor Buckley confirmed to the court that no fractures were detected in any of Tina's bones during the post mortem. Assistant State Pathologist Doctor Margaret Bolster told the court how 15 shards of glass were recovered from Tina's remains, including four pieces from her scalp. Forensic scientist Brian Gorey described the glass fragments as being between two millimetres and five millimetres in size, and coming from the same original piece of heat-treated glass.

Detective Garda David Kelleher testified to the court how he re-arrested Richard Satchwell in Youghal on the afternoon of 12 October 2023, and that Satchwell was then taken to Cobh Garda Station for questioning. The jury was then shown a video recording of Satchwell's interrogation, where he told Detective Sergeant David Noonan that on the day in question Tina had attempted to stab him with a chisel, and that in defending himself he claimed to have accidentally strangled her with the belt from her own dressing gown, remarking that it happened so quickly she was dead before he realized what had occurred. Satchwell claimed the next few days went by in a blur, but that he placed Tina's dead body in a freezer as their dogs kept interacting with her remains, before he started to dig a grave under the stairs. Satchwell claimed to have lined the hole with black plastic and lowered Tina's body into her grave, then folded the plastic over and placed flowers on top. He claimed to then have filled in the hole with soil, and to have poured concrete over the shallow grave. When challenged that he could recall events before and after Tina's death in great detail, but was scant on exactly how she came to die and that it seemed to Gardaí he had something to hide, Satchwell denied Tina's killing was premeditated.

At the conclusion of the prosecution's case, and in absence of the jury, defence lawyers applied to have the charge of murder withdrawn against Satchwell, asserting that no evidence had been submitted that proved an intention to kill or cause serious injury. Justice McDermott ruled that the clandestine disposal of Tina's dead body, and his six-year campaign of deceit to prevent its discovery, was relevant to the issue of intent, and that the jury could decide for themselves if Satchwell was guilty.

=== Defence submissions ===
Defence counsel Brendan Grehan called only a single witness, Tina Satchwell's half-sister Lorraine Howard, who told the court that Satchwell had previously shown controlling behaviour towards Tina. Howard also testified that she once overheard Tina telling her grandmother that she had slapped Satchwell in the face. When offered the opportunity to take the stand in his own defense, Satchwell exercised his right to silence and declined to give evidence or be cross examined by the prosecution.

=== Closing statements ===
Addressing the jury, prosecuting counsel Gerardine Small denounced Satchwell's account of how Tina had died as implausible and self-serving, pointing out the many lies he had told before her body was discovered in the shallow grave he had dug for her. Small S.C. also highlighted the email sent to a charity on the day of her death hinting that Tina might walk out on him, which she dismissed as a calculated attempt at creating a digital footprint that he could rely on if her body was ever discovered in the future. Defence counsel Brendan Grehan told the jury that the prosecution had not presented evidence that proved Satchwell had intended to kill or cause serious injury to Tina, urging them to consider finding him guilty of manslaughter instead. Presiding judge, Justice Paul McDermott, told the jury to assess the case in a very careful and clinical way, and that their verdict must only be in accordance with the evidence presented in court.

After Justice McDermott had finished instructing the jury, Satchwell instructed his lawyers to seek the jury's discharge, asserting that the judge had placed more emphasis on the prosecution's evidence rather than offering a balanced view of both sides of the argument. The judge rejected this accusation of bias and rejected the defense application; however, Justice McDermott did give the jury further directions regarding certain aspects highlighted by Satchwell's legal team.

=== Verdict and sentencing ===
On 30 May 2025, after more than nine hours of jury deliberations over four days, Richard Satchwell was unanimously found guilty of the murder of Tina Satchwell. Satchwell showed no emotion as the verdict was announced; he was later sentenced to the mandatory penalty of life in prison. Satchwell appealed his conviction but it is not expected to be heard before 2027.

== Post trial ==
In early June 2025, Garda Commissioner Drew Harris stated that a review of the investigation into Tina Satchwell's murder would be carried out.

A book published in late 2025 accused Satchwell of conducting coercive control over his wife for a period of over thirty years.

== See also ==
- List of solved missing person cases (2010s)
