= Robbie Bonham =

Irish comedian (1971–2025)

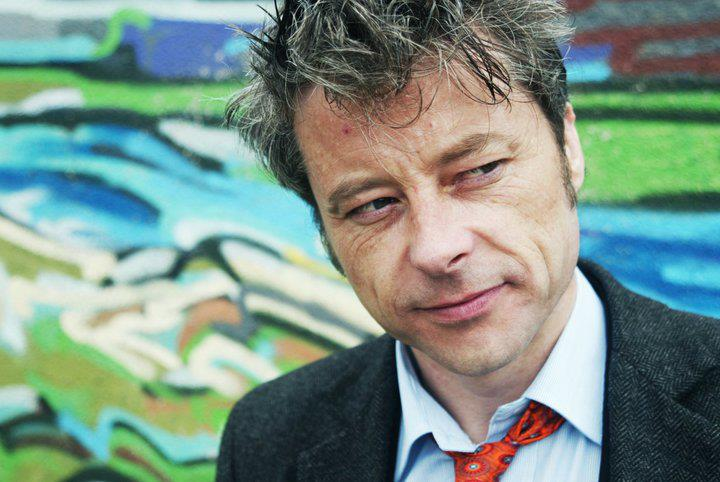
- Picture by Emmet O'Malley
- Born: Robert Bonham; 7 April 1970; Dublin, Ireland
- Died: 21 January 2025 (aged 53); Dublin, Ireland

Comedy career
- Years active: 2003–2025
- Medium: Stand-up, Cartoon, Art, Music, Radio, Film, clown, adult entertainer
- Genres: Observational comedy, Black comedy
- Subjects: Relationships, Nerd Culture, Everyday Life, Ireland, Recreational drug use, Human sexuality, Religion, Men's Rights, Self-deprecation, philosophy, Spirituality, Pessimism, Conspiracy Theories
- Website: robbiebonham.wordpress.com

Robbie Bonham (7 April 1970 – 21 January 2025) was an Irish comedian who performed stand-up in Ireland and internationally from 2004.

Robbie was also a cartoonist and artist, with published cartoons in English, Spanish, French, Dutch, and Italian. He worked in radio, presenting a weekly show on Liber8 FM and appearing on many other Irish radio shows.

Bonham died in Dublin on 21 January 2025, at the age of 54.
