= Don Connellan =

Irish Gaelic footballer (1973–2025)

Personal information
- Born: 26 September 1973 County Roscommon, Ireland
- Died: 4 August 2025 (aged 51) Moycullen, County Galway, Ireland
- Occupation: Garda

Sport
- Sport: Gaelic football
- Position: Right Half Forward
Club
- Years: Club
- Kilmore
College
- Years: College
- 1992: UCG
College titles
- Sigerson titles: 1
Inter-county
- Years: County
- 1993–2000's: Roscommon
Inter-county titles
- Connacht titles: 1

Don Connellan (26 September 1973 – 4 August 2025) was an Irish Gaelic football manager and player. He played his football for the Kilmore club and at senior level for the Roscommon county team, while working as a garda.

Connellan was from Kilmore. He made his senior inter-county championship debut in 1993 in a 1–12 to 1–10 win over Leitrim in Carrick-on-Shannon. Connellan won a Connacht Senior Football Championship title while playing for Roscommon in 2001.

As a manager, he led Moycullen to a maiden Galway Senior Football Championship title in 2020. Don would again lead Moycullen to another county title in 2022, before going on to win the Connaught Club Championship, beating Sligo champions Tourlestrane by a scoreline of 13pts to 6pts.

Don was part of Maurice Sheridan's management team when NUI Galway got a Sigerson Cup in 2022, beating University of Limerick in the final by 12 pts to 1-6.

Connellan died on 4 August 2025, at the age of 51.
