= Paddy Carolan =

Irish Gaelic footballer (1929–2025)

Personal information
- Native name: Pádraig Ó Cearúlláin (Irish)
- Born: 1929 Mullagh, County Cavan, Ireland
- Died: 19 September 2025 (aged 96) Mullagh, County Cavan, Ireland
- Height: 5 ft 11 in (180 cm)

Sport
- Sport: Gaelic football
- Position: Right wing-back
Clubs
- Years: Club
- Mullagh; Cúchulainns
Club titles
- Cavan titles: 0
Inter-county
- Years: County
- Cavan
Inter-county titles
- Ulster titles: 3
- All-Irelands: 1
- NFL: 1

Patrick J. Carolan (1929 – 19 September 2025) was an Irish Gaelic footballer. At club level, he played with Cúchulainns and at inter-county level with the Cavan senior football team. Carolan died in Mullagh, County Cavan on 19 September 2025, at the age of 96.

== Honours ==
Mullagh

- Cavan Junior Football Championship: 1955

Cavan

- All-Ireland Senior Football Championship: 1952
- Ulster Senior Football Championship: 1952, 1954, 1955
- National Football League: 1949–50
