= Cathedral Square, Milan (painting) =

1968 painting by Gerhard Richter

- Domplatz, Mailand (German)
- Artist: Gerhard Richter
- Year: 1968
- Catalogue: Catalogue Raisonné: 169
- Medium: Oil on canvas
- Dimensions: 290 cm × 275 cm (110 in × 108 in)
- Owner: Private collection
- Website: gerhard-richter.com

Cathedral Square, Milan is a 1968 painting by Gerhard Richter. The photorealistic painting is one of Richter's largest figurative paintings at 2.75 m x 2.90 m. It depicts Milan's Cathedral Square between the Galleria Vittorio Emanuele and the Milan Cathedral. It was sold by Sotheby's in New York on 14 May 2013 for 37.1 million dollars, breaking Richter's own record price for an artwork by a living artist, his 1994 32.4 million dollar painting Abstraktes Bild (809-1).

== History ==
Cathedral Square, Milan was commissioned by Siemens Elettra and from 1968 to 1998 hung in their offices in Milan. In 1998, it was acquired by the Pritzker family and was on display for more than ten years at the Park Hyatt Hotel in Chicago. In 2013, the Hyatt Hotels Corporation consigned it to Sotheby's to be auctioned. It was bought by Donald L. Bryant, a Californian art collector and the founder of the Bryant Family Vineyard in Napa County.

== Description ==
The painting shows the northern part of the Milan cathedral square from a bird's-eye view. The facade of the Galleria Vittorio Emanuele, an imposing structure from the 19th century, takes up most of the left half of the painting, while only a part of the northern transept and the front of the nave of the gothic cathedral Santa Maria Nascente are visible. Between the Galleria and the Cathedral Square, one can see parked cars, on the square itself, several candelabra and – blurred like in many early photographs – vague outlines of people and undetermined objects. The contours of the buildings are out of focus and blurry. The many greytones in which the painting has been executed are reminiscent of black-and-white photography.

Richter did not place the cathedral, the best-known tourist attraction in Milan, in the centre of the painting. Instead he directed his view to its immediate surroundings with the space between the Galleria and the cathedral at its centre. Richter had already painted the facade of the cathedral in 1964 with Mailand, Dom also in graytones but in a smaller format of 130 x 130 cm. Parallel to Domplatz, Mailand Richter created another painting that had Milan as its subject, based on an aerial photograph, also in graytones and blurry contours that Richter later cut up in pieces of 85 x 90 cm, and declared them individual images that are listed in the Catalogue Raisonné as 170/1 to 170/9.

The source after which Richter executed Domplatz, Mailand was a newspaper photograph that was in focus, from which Richter clipped a section and modified it.

== Photography and cityscapes in the work of Gerhard Richter ==
From the 1960s onward Richter increasingly dealt with the photographic medium by referring to photographs as his choice of pictorial motif. In 1962 he created the first representational paintings that were based on photographs.

In interviews, Richter has spoken about his attitude to photography several times. The motives were never arbitrary, but he had difficulties "to find a suitable photo at all". Provocatively and contrary to established media theories, he naively considered photography "the only image that reports the absolute truth because it sees 'objectively'; it has primary credibility, even though it is technically deficient ".

In a conversation with Dieter Hülsmanns und Fridolin Reske he said:

A photo, unless it is "designed" by an art photographer, is simply the best picture I can think of. It's perfect, so independent and unconditional, it has no style. The photo is the only image that can truly inform, even if it is technically deficient and the depicted is barely recognizable.

— Interview with Dieter Hülsmanns und Florian Reske. 1966

Richter continued to create work that was based on aerial photography, from the Stadtbild M series 170/1 to 170/9 from 1968 to the print series Bridge 14 FEB 45 (II) from 2000.

After his gray pictures, which represent the rejection of everything creative and according to Richter are "the most welcome and only possible equivalence to indifference, meaninglessness, refusal to statement and formlessness", from 1976 he began dealing with colour in his Abstrakte Bilder (Abstract Pictures).

== See also ==
- List of most expensive artworks by living artists

== Bibliography ==
- Angelika Thill u. a.: Gerhard Richter: A Catalogue Raisonné 1962-1993. Bd. 3. Ostfildern-Ruit, Hatje-Cantz, 1993. Kat. Nr. 169.
- Gerhard Richter. 1962-1993. Volume III. Bonn/Paris: Kunst- und Ausstellungshalle der Bundesrepublik Deutschland. 1993. OCLC 464016167.
- Gerhard Richter. Fotografie und Malerei - Malerei als Fotografie. Acht Texte zu Gerhard Richters
- Elger, Dietmar; Küster, Kerstin (2011). Gerhard Richter: Fotografie und Malerei - Malerei als Fotografie : acht texte zu Gerhard Richters Medienstrategie (in German). Köln: W. König. ISBN 9783863350772. OCLC 836140070.
- Richter, Gerhard; Städtisches Museum (Mönchengladbach) (1975). Gerhard Richter, graue Bilder: 4. Dezember bis 12. Januar 1975 (in German). Mönchengladbach. OCLC 164604834.
- Richter, Gerhard; Elger, Dietmar; Sprengel-Museum (2002). Gerhard Richter: Landschaften (in German). Ostfildern-Ruit: Hatje Cantz. ISBN 3775791051. OCLC 185759268.
