= Elaine Dannheisser =

Elaine Dannheisser (Brooklyn 1923 - 2001 Manhattan) was an avid contemporary art collector and driving force behind the Werner and Elaine Dannheisser Art Collection. She was a onetime trustee of the Guggenheim Museum. Following an exhibition of her collection in 1997-98, she donated the largest ever cache of contemporary art to the Museum of Modern Art.

== Early activity ==
Early in her life, Elaine Dannheisser studied art at Art Students League of New York. Werner Dannheisser (1909–1992) and Elaine married and initially collected French painting such as Pablo Picasso, Jean Dubuffet, Maurice Utrillo and Fernand Léger.

In the 1980s the Dannheissers sold their French painting collection and began to purchase contemporary art from Soho and East Village galleries. Elaine became a passionate bridge player, frequently spending six hours a day at the Beverly Bridge Club, at Lexington Avenue and 57th Street.

== Dannheisser Foundation ==
In 1982, the couple established the Dannheisser Foundation, which donated art works to museums and maintained a 9,000-square-foot space on Duane Street in lower Manhattan for art display and on-site performance art. There they held an extensive collection of contemporary art, including work by Bruce Nauman, Brice Marden and Robert Gober. With The Dannheisser Foundation, the Dannheissers focused on a comparatively small number of key figures from the wide variety of new art produced during this period. Their taste ran to art of severe formality or startling graphic intensity, from the minimalist sculpture of Carl Andre and Richard Serra, the austere paintings of Robert Ryman, and the conceptual art projects of Felix Gonzalez-Torres to the staged photographs of Cindy Sherman. Other artists in the collection at one time or another included Mark Innerst, Jeff Koons, Matthew Barney, Joseph Nechvatal, Bernd and Hilla Becher, Andreas Gursky, Thomas Struth, Gilbert & George, Dan Graham, Tom Otterness, Joseph Beuys, Tony Cragg, Katharina Fritsch, Anselm Kiefer, and Sigmar Polke. Much of this adventurous collection of contemporary artworks has been donated to The Museum of Modern Art, although MOMA turned down Dannheisser's 1996 offer to donate Christopher Wool's celebrated 1988 word painting Apocalypse Now, which would sell in 2013 for $26,485,000 at Christie's auction house.

The Dannheisser Foundation at Duane Street closed in 2001 on the death of Elaine Dannheisser.
