= Cologne Cathedral Window =

Stained-glass window in Cologne cathedral

Coordinates: 50°56′27″N 6°57′29″E

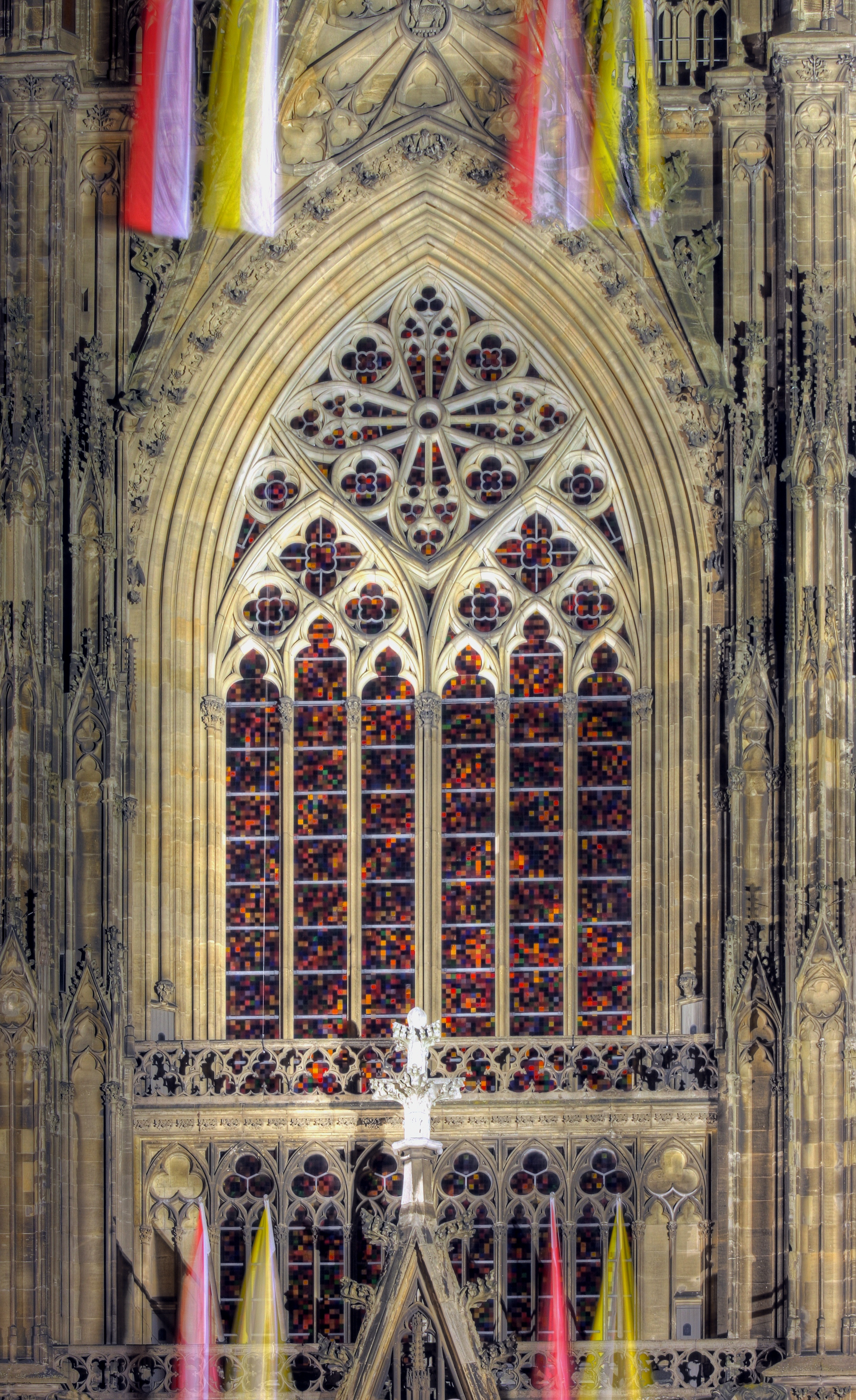
External, nocturnal view of the Richter window in the south transept

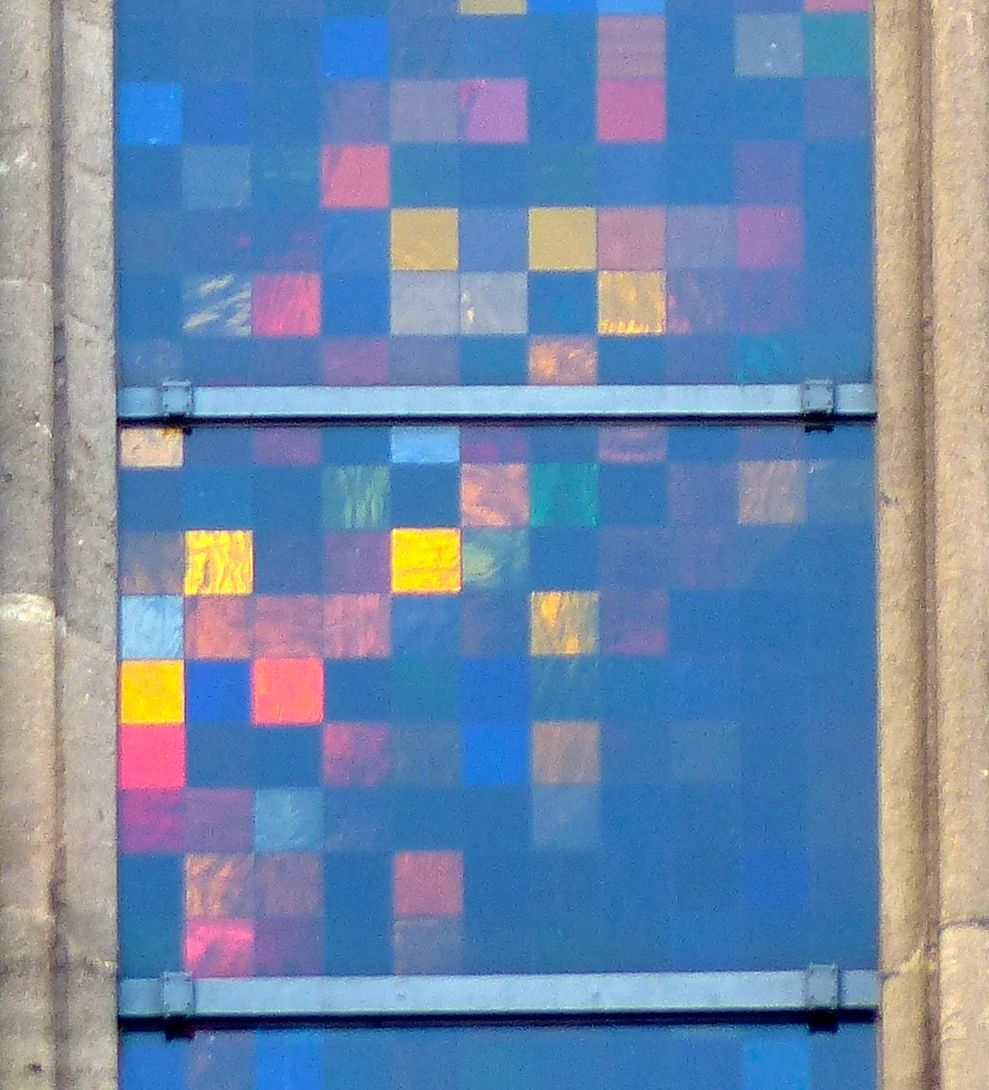
Sunshine through the Richter window (detail)

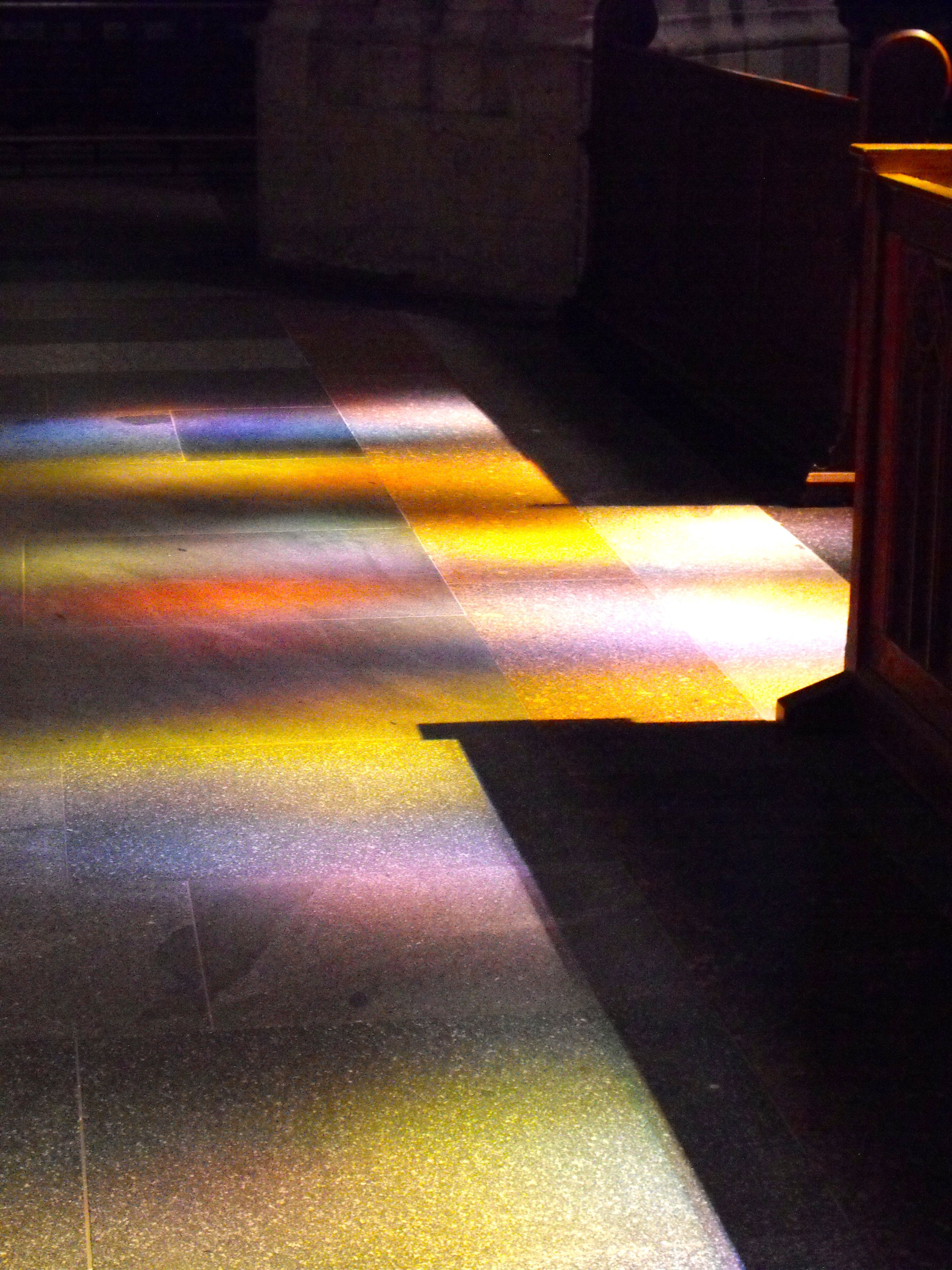
Transillumination of colour in the cathedral's interior, created by the passage of light through the window's mouth-blown glass

The Cologne Cathedral Window is the stained glass window in the south transept of the Cologne Cathedral designed by Cologne artist Gerhard Richter. On a surface of 106 square metres, 11,263 glass squares in 72 colours of 9.6 cm × 9.6 cm were principally arranged randomly, with others selected in response to architectural context. The window was inaugurated on 25 August 2007 as part of a Eucharistic celebration; the abstract execution was both celebrated and strongly criticized.

== Predecessors ==
Originally, in 1863, windows with the depiction of secular and Christian rulers made by the Royal Stained Glass Institute in Berlin-Charlottenburg had been installed, donated by the Kingdom of Prussia. The windows were destroyed in World War II and replaced in 1948 by a simple ornamental glazing by Wilhelm Teuwen, that was in need of restoration. Because of their colourlessness, the incident light was very bright, which was perceived as very disturbing.

== Prehistory and implementation ==
In 2003 the cathedral chapter for the Cologne cathedral decided to have the window renewed. The original designs from the 19th century were, like the stained glass windows themselves, destroyed in World War II and no longer available. It was planned to make a memorial to the German martyrs of the twentieth century, such as Edith Stein and Maximilian Kolbe, and to commemorate the Holocaust. The visual designs of the commissioned artists Egbert Verbeek and Manfred Hürlimann could not convince the cathedral chapter, but the abstract design by Gerhard Richter, who had been asked to provide one by master builder Barbara Schock-Werner did. He had cut up a photo of his painting 4096 Farben from 1974 and pasted it behind the tracery of the window. In 2005 the cathedral chapter asked Richter to develop the design further. In 2006, the artist was finally commissioned.

The €370,000 in manufacturing costs were funded by about 1,200 donors; Gerhard Richter himself worked without a fee.

== Execution ==
From a palette of 800, Richter chose 72 colours that were also in use in the medieval windows of the cathedral and those of the 19th century.

The coloured squares were arranged by a random number generator. Reflections and repetitions were predetermined, the lanes 1 and 3, 2 and 5 as well as 4 and 6 mirror each other. At a few spots Richter made corrections to the distribution, for example where the arrangement of the pixel was suggestive of meaning, for example in the lower part the number "1". Richter said to that: "I rather held myself back. I wanted the window to have something self-evident, something everyday, at least it should not be 'color noise'. Not too warm, not too cold, restrained, as neutral as possible."

"This interaction of chance and calculation created an abstract 'colour-tone carpet' whose particles glow in the light of day and are not held together with lead cames, but fixed on a support disc with silicone gel, so that the coloured facets interact without the usual lines in the glass painting. In addition, the different incidence of light continually changes the colour effect of the window".

The window was fabricated by Derix Glasstudios.

== Reception ==
Georg Imdahl wrote in the Kölner Stadt-Anzeiger: "In the 60s Richter painted his first colour grids as an attack against the falsehood and piety, how abstraction was celebrated, with phoney reverence; downright fulminating against "devotional art" and "religious applied arts", as which the grids were celebrated".

Master builder Barbara Schock-Werner: "Stained glass can only be done on the premises". Initial designs had a "bathroom touch" or would have emitted the light of a "tavern glazing".

Richter himself found one of the designs "too Christmas-like".

Cologne cardinal Joachim Meisner, who was not part of the cathedral chapter, strongly criticized the window: "The window would be better suited to a mosque or another house of prayer. If we're going to have a new window, it should be one that reflects our faith. Not just any." In Islam, pictorial representations of people (as created in God's image) are prohibited. The statement was later relativized by the spokesman of the archdiocese, but it nevertheless came to nationwide attention in the media.

"In seiner überwältigenden Farbenfülle ist es selbst eine Symphonie des Lichts, in der alle Farben des Doms erklingen" ("In its overwhelming abundance of colours, it is itself a symphony of light in which all the colours of the cathedral ring out") concluded Josef Sauerborn, artist pastor of the Cologne diocese, in his sermon at the festival service on the occasion of the unveiling in August 2007.

"Dieses Fenster stellt nichts Religiöses dar" ("This window does not represent anything religious"), explained provost Norbert Feldhoff in 2006, "but a challenge to seeing; it invites silence, it creates a light shimmering with colours, it animates, inspirits, calls for meditation and creates a flair that opens for the religious".

The window also found the approval of those responsible for the Reims Cathedral, who also considered Richter for the design of a window; after Richter declined, the commission was given to the artist Imi Knoebel.

== Bibliography ==
- Bühren, Ralf van (2008). Kunst und Kirche im 20. Jahrhundert : die Rezeption des Zweiten Vatikanischen Konzils (in German). Paderborn: Ferdinand Schöningh. ISBN 978-3-506-76388-4. OCLC 150267397.
- Diederich, Stephan (2007). Gerhard Richter, Zufall : das Kölner Domfenster und 4900 Farben = The Cologne cathedral window, and 4900 colours (in German). Köln: Verlag Kölner Dom. ISBN 978-3-86560-298-5. OCLC 183257862.
