= Maurice Choriol =

French Roman Catholic priest and abbot (1959–2025)

- Born: Alain Choriol; 22 November 1959; Erstein, France
- Died: 9 July 2025 (aged 65); Sankt Wendel, Saarland, Germany
- Education: University of Fribourg
- Occupation(s): Priest abbot

Mauritius Choriol (né Alain Choriol; 22 November 1959 – 9 July 2025) was a French-born German Roman Catholic priest and abbot.

Choriol worked as a renowned chef in Switzerland before attending the University of Fribourg and his ordination as a priest in 1993. He joined the Benedictines and became a German naturalised citizen in 2002. Later he was elected an abbot of the Tholey Abbey.

Choriol died of a heart attack at the hospital in Sankt Wendel, on 9 July 2025, at the age of 65.
