= Gerhard Richter =

German visual artist (born 1932)

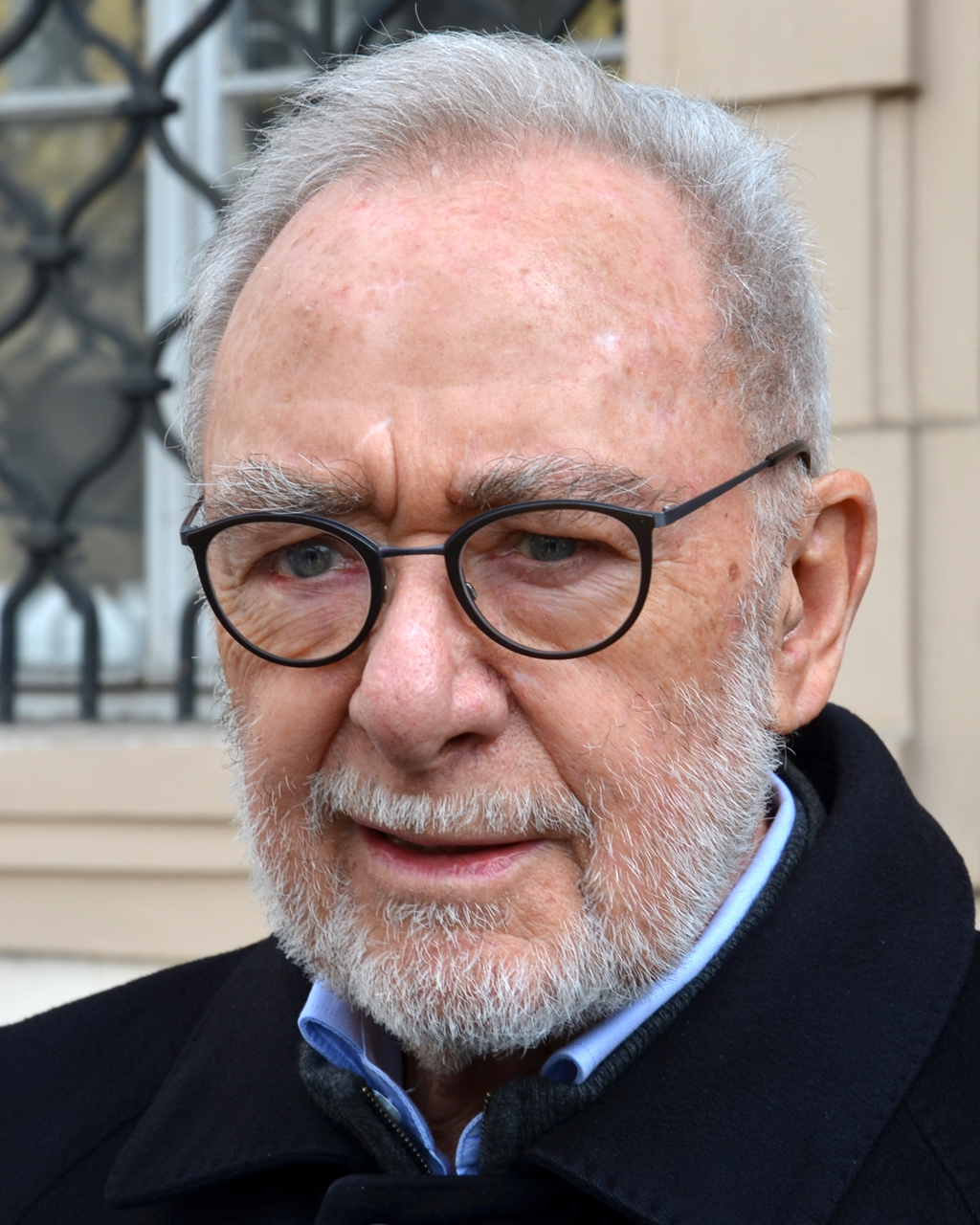
- Richter in 2017
- Born: 9 February 1932 (age 94); Dresden, Free State of Saxony, German Reich
- Education: Dresden Art Academy, Kunstakademie Düsseldorf
- Known for: Painting
- Movement: abstract art, photo realism, conceptual art, capitalist realism
- Website: www.gerhard-richter.com

Gerhard Richter (German: [ˈɡeːɐ̯haʁt ˈʁɪçtɐ]; born 9 February 1932) is a German visual artist. Richter has produced abstract as well as photorealistic paintings, photographs and glass pieces. He is widely regarded as one of the most important contemporary German artists and several of his works have set record prices at auction, with him being the most expensive living painter at one time.

Richter has been called the "greatest living painter", "the world's most important artist" and the "Picasso of the 21st century".

== Personal life ==
=== Childhood and education ===
Richter was born in Hospital Dresden-Neustadt in Dresden, Saxony, and grew up in Reichenau (now Bogatynia, Poland), and in Waltersdorf (Zittauer Gebirge), in the Upper Lusatian countryside, where his father worked as a village teacher. Gerhard's mother, Hildegard Schönfelder, gave birth to him at the age of 25. Hildegard's father, Ernst Alfred Schönfelder, at one time was considered a gifted pianist. Ernst moved the family to Dresden after taking up the family enterprise of brewing and eventually went bankrupt. Once in Dresden, Hildegard trained as a bookseller, and in doing so realized a passion for literature and music. Gerhard's father, Horst Richter, was a mathematics and physics student at the Technische Hochschule in Dresden. The two were married in 1931.

After struggling to maintain a position in the new National Socialist education system, Horst found a position in Reichenau. Gerhard's younger sister, Gisela, was born there in 1936. Horst and Hildegard were able to remain primarily apolitical due to Reichenau's location in the countryside. Horst, being a teacher, was eventually forced to join the National Socialist Party. He never became an avid supporter of Nazism, and was not required to attend party rallies. When he was 10 years old, Gerhard was conscripted into the Deutsches Jungvolk; the Hitler Youth, for teenage boys, was dissolved at the end of the war, before Richter reached the age of enlistment. In 1943, Hildegard moved the family to Waltersdorf, and was later forced to sell her piano. Two brothers of Hildegard died as soldiers in the war and a sister, Gerhard's aunt Marianne, who had schizophrenia, was starved to death in a psychiatric clinic, a victim of the Nazi euthanasia program.

Richter left school after 10th grade and apprenticed as an advertising and stage-set painter, before studying at the Dresden Academy of Fine Arts. In 1948, he finished vocational high school in Zittau and, between 1949 and 1951, successively worked as an apprentice with a sign painter and as a painter. In 1950, his application for study at the Dresden Academy of Fine Arts was rejected as "too bourgeois". He finally began his studies at the Academy in 1951. His teachers there were Karl von Appen, Heinz Lohmar, and Will Grohmann.

=== Relationships ===
Richter married Marianne Eufinger in 1957; she gave birth to his first daughter. He married his second wife, the sculptor Isa Genzken, in 1982. Richter had two sons and a daughter with his third wife, Sabine Moritz, after they were married in 1995.

=== Early career ===
In the early days of his career, he prepared a wall painting (Communion with Picasso, 1955) for the refectory of his Academy of Arts as part of his B.A. Another mural entitled Lebensfreude (Joy of life) followed at the German Hygiene Museum for his diploma. It was intended to produce an effect "similar to that of wallpaper or tapestry".

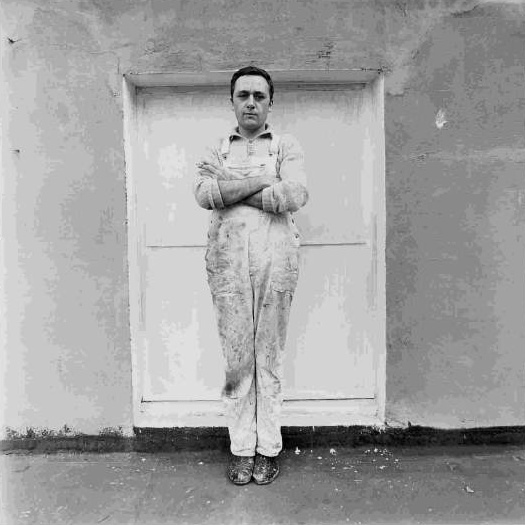
Gerhard Richter c. 1970, photograph by Lothar Wolleh

From 1957 to 1961 Richter worked as a master trainee in the academy and took commissions for the then state of East Germany. During this time, he worked intensively on murals like Arbeiterkampf (Workers' struggle), on oil paintings (e.g. portraits of the East German actress Angelica Domröse and of Richter's first wife Ema), on various self-portraits, and on a panorama of Dresden with the neutral name Stadtbild (Townscape, 1956).

Together with his wife Marianne, Richter escaped from East to West Germany two months before the building of the Berlin Wall in 1961. Both his wall paintings in the Academy of Arts and the Hygiene Museum were then painted over for ideological reasons. Much later, after German reunification, two "windows" of the wall painting Joy of life (1956) would be uncovered in the stairway of the German Hygiene Museum, but these were later covered over when it was decided to restore the Museum to its original 1930 state. A large portion of the mural was finally uncovered and restored in 2024.

In West Germany, Richter began to study at the Kunstakademie Düsseldorf under Karl Otto Götz, together with Sigmar Polke, Werner Hilsing, HA Schult, Kuno Gonschior, Franz Erhard Walther, Konrad Lueg, and Gotthard Graubner. With Polke and Konrad Fischer (pseudonym Lueg), he introduced the term Kapitalistischer Realismus (Capitalistic Realism) as an anti-style of art, appropriating the pictorial shorthand of advertising. This title also referred to the realist style of art known as Socialist Realism, then the official art doctrine of the Soviet Union, but it also commented upon the consumer-driven art doctrine of Western capitalism.

Richter taught at the Hochschule für bildende Künste Hamburg and the Nova Scotia College of Art and Design as a visiting professor; he returned to the Kunstakademie Düsseldorf in 1971, where he worked as a professor for over 15 years.

In 1983, Richter resettled from Düsseldorf to Cologne, where he still lives and works today. In 1996, he moved into a studio designed by architect Thiess Marwede.

== Art ==
=== Photo-paintings and the "blur" ===
Hunting Party (1966) at the Art Institute of Chicago, in 2023

Richter created various painting pictures from black-and-white photographs during the 1960s and early 1970s, basing them on a variety of sources: newspapers and books, sometimes incorporating their captions, (as in Helga Matura (1966)); private snapshots; aerial views of towns and mountains, (Cityscape Madrid (1968) and Alps (1968)); seascapes (1969–70); and a large multipart work made for the German Pavilion in the 1972 Venice Biennale. For Forty-eight Portraits (1971–72), he chose mainly the faces of composers such as Gustav Mahler and Jean Sibelius, and of writers such as H. G. Wells and Franz Kafka.

From around 1964, Richter made a number of portraits of dealers, collectors, artists, and others connected with his immediate professional circle. Richter's two portraits of Betty, his daughter, were made in 1977 and 1988 respectively; the three portraits titled IG were made in 1993 and depict the artist's second wife, Isa Genzken. Lesende (1994) portrays Sabine Moritz, whom Richter married in 1995, shown absorbed in the pages of a magazine. Many of his realist paintings reflect on the history of Nazism, creating paintings of family members who had been members, as well as victims, of the Nazi party. From 1966, as well as those given to him by others, Richter began using photographs he had taken as the basis for portraits. In 1975, on the occasion of a show in Düsseldorf, Gilbert & George commissioned Richter to make a portrait of them.

Richter began making prints in 1965. He was most active before 1974, only completing sporadic projects since that time. In the period 1965–1974, Richter made most of his prints (more than 100), of the same or similar subjects in his paintings. He has explored a variety of photographic printmaking processes – screenprint, photolithography, and collotype – in search of inexpensive mediums that would lend a "non-art" appearance to his work. He stopped working in print media in 1974, and began painting from photographs he took himself.

While elements of landscape painting appeared initially in Richter's work early on in his career in 1963, the artist began his independent series of landscapes in 1968 after his first vacation, an excursion that landed him besotted with the terrain of Corsica. Landscapes have since emerged as an independent work group in his oeuvre. According to Dietmar Elger, Richter's landscapes are understood within the context of traditional German Romantic Painting. They are compared to the work of Caspar David Friedrich (1774–1840). Friedrich is foundational to German landscape painting. Each artist spent formative years of their lives in Dresden. Große Teyde-Landschaft (1971) takes its imagery from similar holiday snapshots of the volcanic regions of Tenerife.

Atlas was first exhibited in 1972 at the Museum voor Hedendaagse Kunst in Utrecht under the title Atlas der Fotos und Skizzen. It included 315 parts. The work has continued to expand, and was exhibited later in full form at the Lenbachhaus in Munich in 1989, the Museum Ludwig in Cologne in 1990, and at Dia Art Foundation in New York in 1995. Atlas continues as an ongoing, encyclopedic work composed of approximately 4,000 photographs, reproductions or cut-out details of photographs and illustrations, grouped together on approximately 600 separate panels.

In 1972, Richter embarked on a ten-day trip to Greenland. His friend Hanne Darboven was meant to accompany him, but instead, he traveled alone. His intention was to experience and record the desolate arctic landscape. In 1976, four large paintings, each titled Seascape, emerged from the Greenland photographs.

In 1982 and 1983, Richter made a series of paintings of Candles and Skulls that relate to a longstanding tradition of still life memento mori painting. Each composition is most commonly based on a photograph taken by Richter in his own studio. Influenced by old master vanitas painters such as Georges de La Tour and Francisco de Zurbarán, the artist began to experiment with arrangements of candles and skulls placed in varying degrees of natural light, sitting atop otherwise barren tables. The Candle paintings coincided with his first large-scale abstract paintings, and represent the complete antithesis to those vast, colorful and playfully meaningless works. Richter has made only 27 of these still lifes. In 1995, the artist marked the 50th anniversary of the allied bombings of his hometown Dresden during the Second World War. His solitary candle was reproduced on a monumental scale and placed overlooking the River Elbe as a symbol of rejuvenation. Richter has said that while painting this series, "I did experience feelings to do with contemplation, remembering, silence, and death."

In a 1988 series of 15 ambiguous photo paintings entitled 18 October 1977, he depicted four members of the Red Army Faction (RAF), a German left-wing militant organization. These paintings were created from black-and-white newspaper and police photos. Three RAF members were found dead in their prison cells on 18 October 1977 and the cause of their deaths was the focus of widespread controversy. In the late 1980s, Richter had begun to collect images of the group which he used as the basis for the 15 paintings exhibited for the first time in Krefeld in 1989. The paintings were based on an official portrait of Ulrike Meinhof during her years as a radical journalist; on photographs of the arrest of Holger Meins; on police shots of Gudrun Ensslin in prison; on Andreas Baader's bookshelves and the record player to conceal his gun; on the dead figures of Meinhof, Ensslin, and Baader; and on the funeral of Ensslin, Baader, and Jan-Carl Raspe.

Since 1989, Richter has worked on creating new images by dragging wet paint over photographs. The photographs, not all taken by Richter himself, are mostly snapshots of daily life: family vacations, pictures of friends, mountains, buildings, and streetscapes.

Richter was flying to New York on 11 September 2001, but due to the 9/11 attacks, including on the World Trade Center, his plane was diverted to Halifax, Nova Scotia. A few years later, he made one small painting specifically about the planes crashing into the World Trade Center. In September: A History Painting by Gerhard Richter, Robert Storr situates Richter's 2005 painting September within a brand of anti-ideological thought that he finds throughout Richter's work. He considers how the ubiquitous photographic documentation of 11 September attacks affects the uniqueness of one's distinct remembrance of the events, and he offers a valuable comparison to Richter's 18 October 1977 cycle.

In the 2000s, Richter made a number of works that dealt with scientific phenomena. In 2003, he produced several paintings with the same title: Silicate. Large oil-on-canvas pieces, these show latticed rows of light- and dark-grey blobs whose shapes quasi-repeat as they race across the frame, their angle modulating from painting to painting. They depict a photo, published in the Frankfurter Allgemeine Zeitung, of a computer-generated simulacrum of reflections from the silicon dioxide found in insects' shells.

In 2014, Richter created a cycle of four paintings using the Sonderkommando photographs, which were taken in the Auschwitz-Birkenau concentration camp during the Holocaust, titled Birkenau. In October 2021, Gerhard Richter decided to make his Birkenau images permanently available to the International Auschwitz Committee. Currently, the cycle is on permanent display in an exhibition pavilion on the grounds of the International Youth Meeting Center in Oświęcim/Auschwitz, around 2 kilometers from the Auschwitz II-Birkenau site. The pavilion was built according to a design by the artist. In 2024, an edition of the works as prints on metal plate, made and donated by Richter, went on display at the Centre.

=== Abstract work ===
Richter's early work Table (1962) consisted of a painting of a table, taken from a photograph in a magazine, with tachiste gestural marks overlapping. Those marks can be read as cancelling the photorealist representation, using haptic swirls of grey paint, as well as a form of generativity.

In 1969, Richter produced the first of a group of grey monochromes that consist exclusively of the textures resulting from different methods of paint application.

In 1976, Richter first gave the title Abstract Painting to one of his works. By presenting a painting without even a few words to name and explain it, he felt he was "letting a thing come, rather than creating it." In his abstract pictures, Richter builds up cumulative layers of non-representational painting, beginning with brushing big swaths of primary color onto canvas. The paintings evolve in stages, based on his responses to the picture's progress: the incidental details and patterns that emerge. Throughout his process, Richter uses the same techniques he uses in his representational paintings, blurring and scraping to veil and expose prior layers.

From the mid-1980s, Richter began to use a homemade squeegee to rub and scrape the paint that he had applied in large bands across his canvases. In an interview with Benjamin H.D. Buchloch in 1986, Richter was asked about his "Monochrome Grey Pictures and Abstract Pictures" and their connection with the artists Yves Klein and Ellsworth Kelly. The following are Richter's answers:

The Grey Pictures were done at a time when there were monochrome paintings everywhere. I painted them nonetheless. ... Not Kelly, but Bob Ryman, Brice Marden, Alan Charlton, Yves Klein and many others.

In the 1990s the artist began to run his squeegee up and down the canvas in an ordered fashion to produce vertical columns that take on the look of a wall of planks.

Richter's abstract work and its illusion of space developed out of his incidental process: an accumulation of spontaneous, reactive gestures of adding, moving, and subtracting paint. Despite unnatural palettes, spaceless sheets of color, and obvious trails of the artist's tools, the abstract pictures often act like windows through which we see the landscape outside. As in his representational paintings, there is an equalization of illusion and paint. In those paintings, he reduces worldly images to mere incidents of Art. Similarly, in his abstract pictures, Richter exalts spontaneous, intuitive mark-making to a level of spatial logic and believability.

Firenze continues a cycle of 99 works conceived in the autumn of 1999 and executed in the same year and thereafter. This series belongs to the body of work of the overpainted photographs, or übermalte Fotografien, counting more than 2,000 pieces. Firenze consists of small paintings bearing images of the city of Florence, created by the artist as a tribute to the music of Steve Reich and the work of Contempoartensemble, a Florence-based group of musicians.

After 2000, Richter made a number of works that dealt with scientific phenomena, in particular, with aspects of reality that cannot be seen by the naked eye. In 2006, Richter conceived six paintings as a coherent group under the title Cage, named after the American avant-garde composer John Cage. The Cage paintings are large works constructed from intersecting fields, lines, and swaths of uneven smears that reflect the broad squeegee tool which Richter drags across the canvases, before removing areas of paint to generate a subtractive method of concealing and revealing variegated layers and patches. In May 2002, Richter photographed 216 details of his abstract painting no. 648-2, from 1987. Working on a long table over a period of several weeks, Richter combined these 10 x 15 cm details with 165 texts on the Iraq war, published in the German Frankfurter Allgemeine Zeitung newspaper on 20 and 21 March. This work was published in 2004 as a book entitled War Cut.

In November 2008, Richter began a series in which he applied ink droplets to wet paper, using alcohol and lacquer to extend and retard the ink's natural tendency to bloom and creep. The resulting November sheets are regarded as a significant departure from his previous watercolours in that the pervasive soaking of ink into wet paper produced double-sided works. Sometimes, the uppermost sheets bled into others, generating a sequentially developing series of images. In a few cases, Richter applied lacquer to one side of the sheet, or drew pencil lines across the patches of colour.

=== Color chart paintings ===
As early as 1966, Richter had made paintings based on colour charts. For these works, he drew inspirations from using the charts as found objects, which arranged rectangles of colors in an apparently limitless variety of hues. Richter's experiments culminated in 1973-74 in a series of large-format pictures, such as 256 Colours. Between 1966 and 1974, Richter painted three series of Color Chart works, each growing more ambitious in its attempt to create meaning through the purely arbitrary arrangement of colors. The artist began his investigations into the complex permutations of color charts in 1966, with a small painting entitled 10 Colors. The charts provided anonymous and impersonal source material, a way for Richter to disassociate color from any traditional, descriptive, symbolic or expressive end. When he began to make these paintings, Richter had his friend Blinky Palermo randomly call out colors, which Richter then adopted for his work. Chance thus plays its role in the creation of his first series.

Returning to color charts in the 1970s, Richter changed his focus from the readymade to the conceptual system, developing mathematical procedures for mixing colors and employing chance operations for their placement. The range of the colors he employed was determined by a mathematical system for mixing the primary colors in graduated amounts. Each color was then randomly ordered to create the resultant composition and form of the painting. Richter's second series of Color Charts was begun in 1971 and consisted of only five paintings. In the final series of Color Charts which preoccupied Richter throughout 1973 and 1974, additional elements to this permutational system of color production were added in the form of mixes of a light grey, a dark gray and later, a green.

Richter's 4900 Colours from 2007 consisted of bright monochrome squares that have been randomly arranged in a grid pattern to create stunning fields of kaleidoscopic color. It was produced at the same time he developed his design for the south transept window of Cologne Cathedral. 4900 Colours consists of 196 panels in 25 colors that can be reassembled in 11 variations – from a single expansive surface to multiple small-format fields. Richter developed Version II – 49 paintings, each of which measures 97 by 97 centimeters – especially for the Serpentine Gallery.

=== Sculpture ===
Richter began to use glass in his work in 1967, when he made Four Panes of Glass. These plain sheets of glass could tilt away from the poles on which they were mounted at an angle that changed from one installation to the next. In 1970, he and Blinky Palermo jointly submitted designs for the sports facilities for the 1972 Olympic Games in Munich. For the front of the arena, they proposed an array of glass windows in twenty-seven different colors; each color would appear fifty times, with the distribution determined randomly. In 1981, for a two-person show with Georg Baselitz in Düsseldorf, Richter produced the first of the monumental transparent mirrors that appear intermittently thereafter in his oeuvre; the mirrors are significantly larger than Richter's paintings and feature adjustable steel mounts. For pieces such as Mirror Painting (Grey, 735-2) (1991), the mirrors were coloured grey by coating the back of the glass with pigment. Arranged in two rooms, Richter presented an ensemble of paintings and colored mirrors in a special pavilion designed in collaboration with architect Paul Robbrecht at Documenta 9 in Kassel in 1992.

In 2002, for the Dia Art Foundation, Richter created a glass sculpture in which seven parallel panes of glass refract light and the world beyond, offering altered visions of the exhibition space; Spiegel I (Mirror I) and Spiegel II (Mirror II), a two-part mirror piece from 1989 that measures 7' tall and 18' feet long, which alters the boundaries of the environment and again changes one's visual experience of the gallery; and Kugel (Sphere), 1992, a stainless steel sphere that acts as a mirror, reflecting the space. Since 2002, the artist has created a series of three dimensional glass constructions, such as 6 Standing Glass Panels (2002/2011).

=== Drawings ===
In 2010, the Drawing Center showed Lines which do not exist, a survey of Richter's drawings from 1966 to 2005, including works made using mechanical intervention such as attaching a pencil to an electric hand drill. It was the first career overview of Richter in the United States since 40 Years of Painting at the Museum of Modern Art in 2002. In a review of Lines which do not exist, R. H. Lossin wrote in The Brooklyn Rail: "Viewed as a personal (and possibly professional) deficiency, Richter's drawing practice consisted of diligently documenting something that didn't work—namely a hand that couldn't draw properly. ...Richter displaces the concept of the artist's hand with hard evidence of his own, wobbly, failed, and very material appendage."

=== Commissions ===
Throughout his career, Richter has mostly declined lucrative licensing deals and private commissions. Measuring 9 by 9 ½ feet and depicting both the Milan Duomo and the square's 19th-century Galleria Vittorio Emanuele II, Domplatz, Mailand (1968) was a commission from Siemens, and it hung in that company's offices in Milan from 1968 to 1998. (In 1998, Sotheby's sold it in London, where it fetched what was then a record price for Richter, $3.6 million). In 1980, Richter and Isa Genzken were commissioned to design the König-Heinrich-Platz underground station in Duisburg; it was only completed in 1992. In 1986, Richter received a commission for two large-scale paintings – Victoria I and Victoria II – from the Victoria insurance company in Düsseldorf. In 1990, along with Sol LeWitt and Oswald Mathias Ungers, he created works for the Bayerische Hypotheken- und Wechselbank in Düsseldorf. In 1998, he installed a wall piece based on the colours of Germany's flag in the rebuilt Reichstag in Berlin. In 2012 he was asked to design the first page of the German newspaper Die Welt. In 2017 Richter designed the label of the 2015 Chateau Mouton Rothschild's first wine of that year.

=== Church windows ===
Gerhard Richter, Symphony of Light, c. 2007; stained glass window in the Cologne Cathedral, 20 metres (66 ft) tall

In 2002, the same year as his MoMA retrospective, Richter was asked to design a stained glass window in the Cologne Cathedral. In August 2007, his window was unveiled. It is an 113 square metres (1,220 sq ft) abstract collage of 11,500 pixel-like squares in 72 colors, randomly arranged by computer (with some symmetry), reminiscent of his 1974 painting 4096 colours. The artist waived any fee, and the costs of materials and mounting the window came to around €370,000 ($506,000), covered by donations from more than 1,000 people. Cardinal Joachim Meisner did not attend the window's unveiling as he would have preferred it to have been a figurative representation of 20th century Christian martyrs and said that Richter's window would fit better in a mosque or other prayer house. A professed atheist with "a strong leaning towards Catholicism", Richter had his three children with his third wife baptized in the Cologne Cathedral.

In September 2020, Richter unveiled his three 30-foot-tall stained-glass windows for the Tholey Abbey, one of the oldest monasteries in Germany. He called them his last major work, adding that he would focus on drawings and sketches from then on. The large choir windows were made by Gustva van Treeck, an esteemed glass workshop in nearby Munich. They are abstract painted works inspired by his "Pattern" series from the 1990s. An additional 34 figurative stained glass windows designed for the abbey by Afghan-German Muslim artist Mahbuba Maqsoodi are expected to be completed by Easter 2021. The monks of the abbey hoped the windows would promote tourism to the abbey and its town and bring people into the faith.

== Exhibitions ==
Richter first began exhibiting in Düsseldorf in 1963. Richter had his first gallery solo show in 1964 at Galerie Schmela in Düsseldorf. Soon after, he had exhibitions in Munich and Berlin and by the early 1970s exhibited frequently throughout Europe and the United States. In 1966, Bruno Bischofberger was the first to show Richter's works outside Germany. Richter's first retrospective took place at the Kunsthalle Bremen in 1976 and covered works from 1962 to 1974. A traveling retrospective at Düsseldorf's Kunsthalle in 1986 was followed in 1991 by a retrospective at the Tate Gallery, London. In 1993, he received a major touring retrospective "Gerhard Richter: Malerei 1962–1993" curated by Kasper König, with a three volume catalogue edited by Benjamin Buchloh. This exhibition containing 130 works carried out over the course of thirty years, was to entirely reinvent Richter's career.

Richter became known to a U.S. audience in 1990, when the Saint Louis Art Museum circulated Baader-Meinhof (18 October 1977), a show that was later seen at the Lannan Foundation in Marina del Rey, California. Richter's first North American retrospective was in 1998 at the Art Gallery of Ontario and at the Museum of Contemporary Art, Chicago. In 2002, a 40-year retrospective of Richter's work was held at the Museum of Modern Art, New York, and traveled to the Art Institute of Chicago, the San Francisco Museum of Modern Art, and the Hirshhorn Museum and Sculpture Garden, Washington, D.C. In 2016 he took part in international exhibition Doppelgänger, curators: Sandra Mann, Ichiro Irie, Julia-Constance Dissel, Max Presneill, Torrance Art Museum, California. His work is included in the permanent collections of several museum institutions in the US, such as the Pérez Art Museum Miami.

He has participated in several international art shows, including the Venice Biennale (1972, 1980, 1984, 1997 and 2007), as well as Documenta V (1972), VII (1982), VIII (1987), IX (1992), and X (1997). In 2006, an exhibition at the Getty Center connected the landscapes of Richter to the Romantic pictures of Caspar David Friedrich, showing that both artists "used abstraction, expansiveness, and emptiness to express transcendent emotion through painting."

The Gerhard Richter Archive was established in cooperation with the artist in 2005 as an institute of the Staatliche Kunstsammlungen Dresden. In 2020, Gerhard Richter established the Gerhard Richter Art Foundation, a non-profit foundation dedicated to preserving his work and making it available for exhibitions.

The first major exhibition of his work in Australia, Gerhard Richter: The Life of Images, was mounted by the Queensland Gallery of Modern Art in Brisbane from 14 October 2017 to 4 February 2018. It included more than 90 works, including the newly created Atlas Overview, a 400-panel extract selected by Richter from the larger Atlas project now deemed too fragile for loan or travel. In 2022, the Raphael Durazzo Gallery exhibited 2014: 20. November 2014, oil on colored photograph, 15 x 10 cm.

=== Solo exhibitions (selection) ===
- Gerhard Richter 4900 Colours: Version II at the Serpentine Gallery, London, United Kingdom. 2008
- Gerhard Richter Portraits at the National Portrait Gallery, London, United Kingdom. 2009
- Gerhard Richter: Panorama at the Tate Modern, London, United Kingdom. 2011
- Gerhard Richter at the Centre Pompidou, Paris, France. 2012
- Gerhard Richter: Panorama at the Neue Nationalgalerie, Berlin, Germany. 2012
- Gerhard Richter – Editions 1965–2011 at me Collectors Room Berlin, Berlin, Germany
- Gerhard Richter: 'Mood', at Beyeler Foundation, Riehen, Switzerland. 2017.
- Gerhard Richter: The Birkenau Paintings at the Metropolitan Museum of Art, The Met Fifth Avenue. 2020
- Gerhard Richter: Painting After All at the Metropolitan Museum of Art, The MET Breuer, New York. 2020.
- Gerhard Richter: Drawings, 1999-2021, at the Hayward Gallery, London, United Kingdom. 2021.
- Gerhard Richter. Landschaft, Kunsthaus Zürich, Zurich. 2021
- Gerhard Richter: Engadin, joint exhibition at Nietzsche-House, Sils-Maria; the Segantini Museum, St. Moritz; and Hauser & Wirth, St. Moritz, Switzerland. 2024.
- Gerhard Richter at the Fondation Louis Vuitton, Paris, France. 2025 - 2026.
- Gerhard Richter at the David Zwirner Gallery, Paris, France. 2025.

== Gallery ==
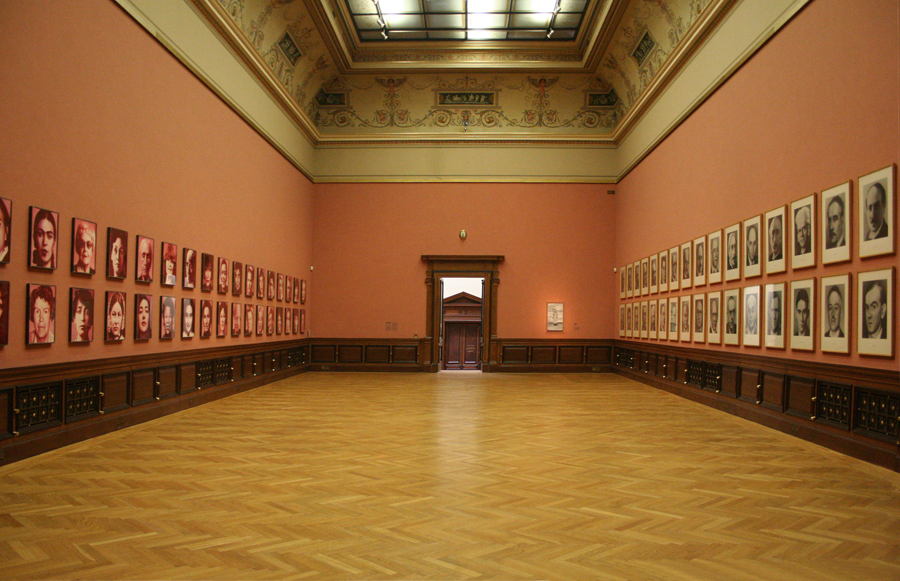
Gerhard Richter, Undeniable Me, 1971/72, 48 painted portraits at the right; at the left portraits of Gottfried Helnwein, 1991–92

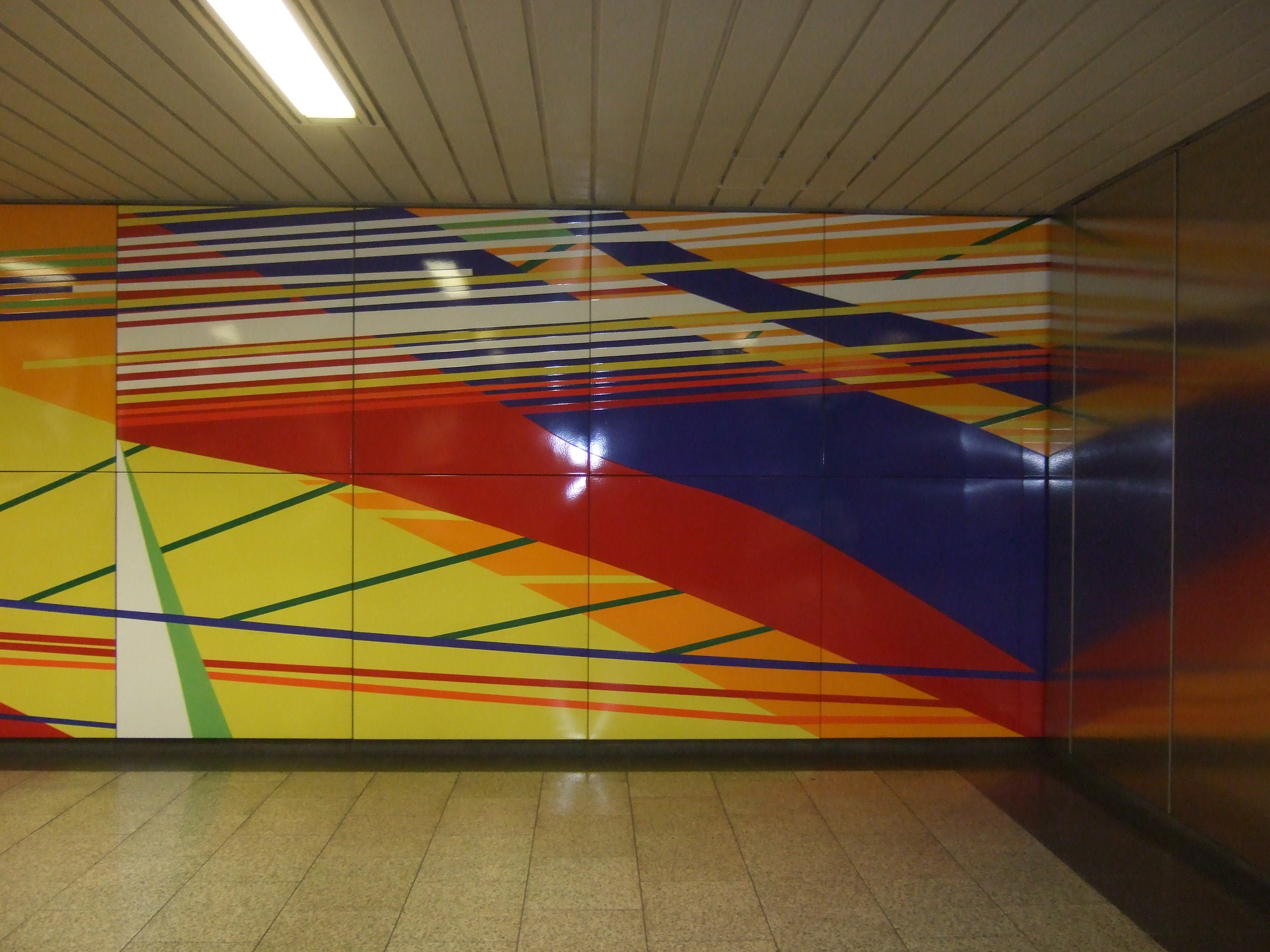
Gerhard Richter & Isa Genzken, Wall-art in underground, Duisburg, 1980–1992, in colorful enamel plates

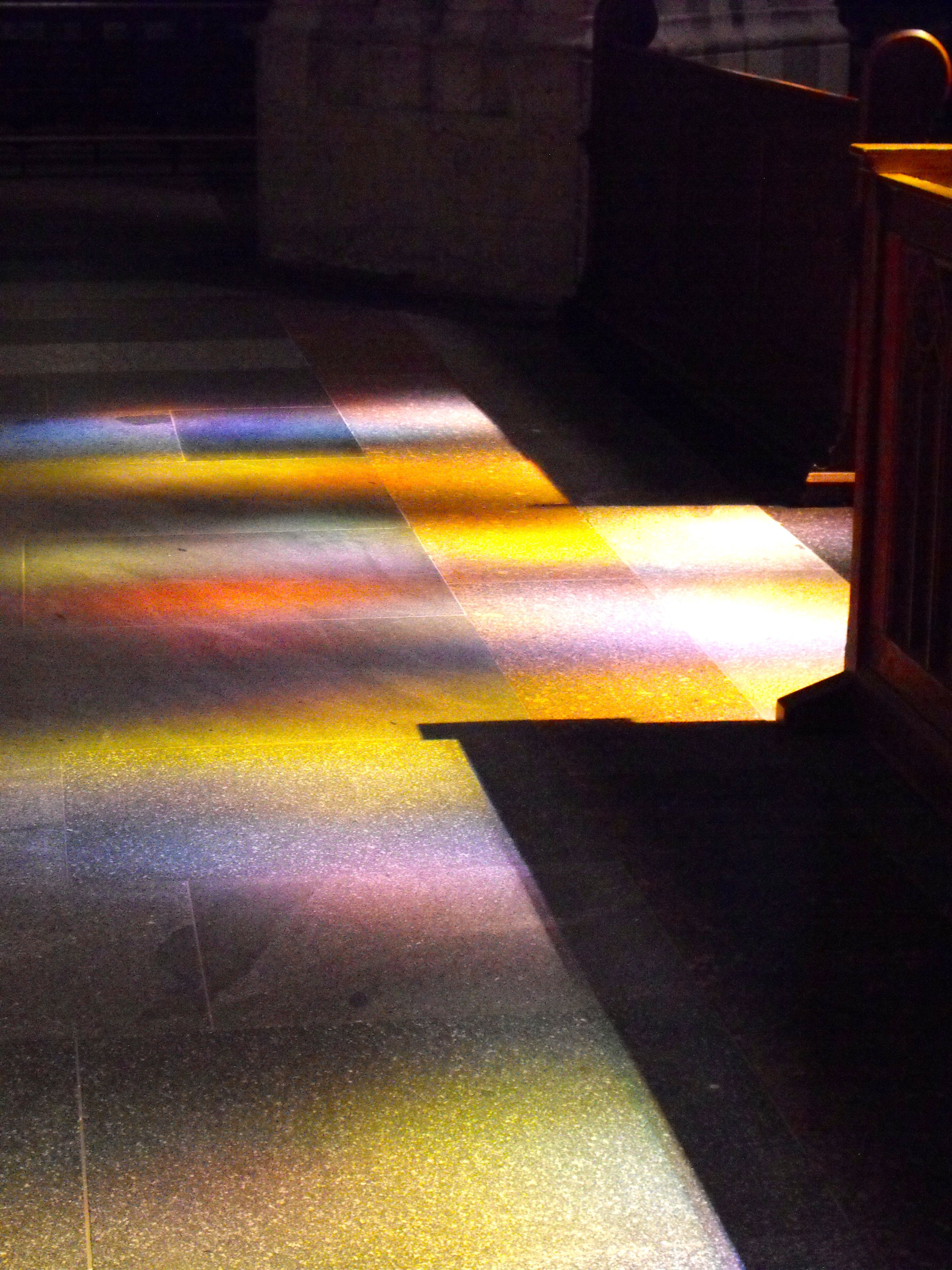
Gerhard Richter, Cologne Cathedral Window, c. 2007, light passing through stained-glass window in Cologne Cathedral

== Recognition ==
Although Richter gained popularity and critical praise throughout his whole career, his fame burgeoned during his 2005 retrospective exhibition, which declared his place among the most important artists of the 20th century. Today, many call Gerhard Richter the best living painter. In part, this comes from his ability to explore the medium at a time when many were heralding its death. Richter has been the recipient of numerous prominent awards, including the State Prize of the state North Rhine-Westphalia, 2000; the Wexner Prize, 1998; the Praemium Imperiale, Japan, 1997; the Golden Lion of the 47th Biennale, Venice, 1997; the Wolf Prize, Israel, 1994/5; the Goslarer Kaiserring Prize der Stadt Goslar, Mönchehaus-Museum für Moderne Kunst, Goslar, Germany, 1988; the Oskar Kokoschka Prize, Vienna, 1985; the Arnold Bode Prize, Kassel, 1981; and the Junger Western Art Prize, Germany, 1961. He was made an honorary citizen of Cologne in April 2007. He was elected to the American Philosophical Society in 2012.

=== Influence ===
Among the students who studied with Richter at the Kunstakademie Düsseldorf between 1971 and 1994 were Ludger Gerdes, Hans-Jörg Holubitschka, Bernard Lokai, Thomas Schütte, Thomas Struth, Katrin Kneffel, Michael van Ofen, and Richter's second wife, Isa Genzken. He is known to have influenced Ellsworth Kelly, Christopher Wool and Johan Andersson.

He has also served as a source of inspiration for writers and musicians. Sonic Youth used a painting of his for the cover art for their album Daydream Nation in 1988. He was a fan of the band and did not charge for the use of his image. The original, over 7 metres (23 ft) square, is now showcased in Sonic Youth's studio in NYC. Don DeLillo's short story "Baader-Meinhof" describes an encounter between two strangers at the Museum of Modern Art in New York. The meeting takes place in the room displaying 18 October 1977 (1988).

Photographer Cotton Coulson described Richter as "one of [his] favourite artists".

For the last 18 years, Gerhard Richter has been the number one on a Kunstkompass scale of most important world artists, made by a German magazine Capital.

=== Position in the art market ===
Following an exhibition with Blinky Palermo at Galerie Heiner Friedrich in 1971, Richter's formal arrangement with the dealer came to an end in 1972. Thereafter, Friedrich was only entitled to sell the paintings that he had already obtained contractually from Richter. In the following years, Richter showed with Galerie Konrad Fischer, Düsseldorf, and Sperone Westwater, New York. Richter's primary dealer and representative gallery between 1985 and 2022 was Marian Goodman. Since December 2022, Richter is represented by David Zwirner Gallery. Today, museums own roughly 38% of Richter's works, including half of his large abstract paintings. By 2004, Richter's annual turnover was $120 million. At the same time, his works often appear at auction. According to artnet, an online firm that tracks the art market, $76.9 million worth of Richter's work was sold at auction in 2010. Richter's high turnover volume reflects his prolificacy as well as his popularity. As of 2012, no fewer than 545 distinct Richter's works had sold at auctions for more than $100,000. 15 of them had sold for more than $10,000,000 between 2007 and 2012. Richter's paintings have been flowing steadily out of Germany since the mid-1990s even as certain important German collectors – Frieder Burda, Josef Fröhlich, Georg Böckmann, and Ulrich Ströher – have held on to theirs.

Richter's candle paintings were the first to command high auction prices. Three months after his MoMA exhibition opened in 2001, Sotheby's sold his Three Candles (1982) for $5.3 million. In February 2008, the artist's eldest daughter, Betty, sold her Kerze (1983) for £7,972,500 ($15 million), triple the high estimate, at Sotheby's in London. His 1982 Kerze (Candle) sold for £10.5 million ($16.5 million) at Christie's London in October 2011.

In February 2008, Christie's London set a first record for Richter's "capitalist realism" pictures from the 1960s by selling the painting Zwei Liebespaare (1966) for £7,300,500 ($14.3 million) to Stephan Schmidheiny. In 2010, the Weserburg modern art museum in Bremen, Germany, decided to sell Richter's 1966 painting Matrosen (Sailors) in a November auction held by Sotheby's, where John D. Arnold bought it for $13 million. Vierwaldstätter See, the largest of a distinct series of four views of Lake Lucerne painted by Richter in 1969, sold for £15.8 million ($24 million) at Christie's London in 2015.

Another coveted group of works is the Abstrakte Bilder series, particularly those made after 1988, which are finished with a large squeegee rather than a brush or roller. At Pierre Bergé & Associés in July 2009, Richter's 1979 oil painting Abstraktes Bild exceeded its estimate, selling for €95,000 ($136,000). Richter's Abstraktes Bild, of 1990 was made the top price of 7.2 million pounds, or about $11.6 million, at a Sotheby's sale in February 2011 to a bidder who was said by dealers to be an agent for the New York dealer Larry Gagosian. In November 2011, Sotheby's sold a group of colorful abstract canvases by Richter, including Abstraktes Bild 849-3, which made a record price for the artist at auction when Lily Safra paid $20.8 million only to donate it to the Israel Museum afterwards. Months later, a record $21.8 million was paid at Christie's for the 1993 painting Abstraktes Bild 798-3. Abstraktes Bild (809–4), one of the artist's abstract canvases from 1994, was sold by Eric Clapton at Sotheby's to a telephone bidder for $34.2 million in late 2012. (It had been estimated to bring $14.1 million to $18.8 million.)

This was exceeded in May 2013 when his 1968 piece Cathedral Square, Milan was sold for $37.1 million (£24.4 million) in New York. This was further exceeded in February 2015 when his 1986 painting Abstraktes Bild (599) sold for $44.52 million (£30.4 million) in London at Sotheby's Contemporary Evening Sale. This was the highest price at auction of a piece of contemporary art at the time; Richter's record was broken on 12 November 2013 when Jeff Koons' Balloon Dog (Orange), sold at Christie's Post-War and Contemporary Art Evening Sale in New York City for US$58.4 million.

When asked about art prices like these, Richter said "It's just as absurd as the banking crisis. It's impossible to understand and it's daft!"

=== Film ===
External videos
- Portraits, Paul Moorhouse, 2009, 15:46
- Gerhard Richter's Betty, 4:58 on YouTube, Smarthistory

In 2003, Gerald Fox made a documentary on the life of Gerhard Richter in which he starred. In 2007, Corinna Belz made a short film called Gerhard Richter's Window. In 2011, Belz's feature-length documentary entitled Gerhard Richter Painting was released. The film focused almost entirely on the world's highest paid living artist producing his large-scale abstract squeegee works in his studio. The 2018 drama film Never Look Away is inspired by Richter's life story.

In 2016 and 2019 Richter worked again with Corinna Belz on two films based on his 2012 book Patterns. The previous piece named Richters Patterns when shown is partnered with music by the German composer Marcus Schmickler, the later one by the American composer Steve Reich, both performed by a live ensemble. The later work in turn is part of a larger two-section collaboration, Reich Richter Pärt which was commissioned for the inaugural season at The Shed in the Hudson Yards development in Manhattan in New York City.

== See also ==
- Wand (Wall)
- Birkenau series
