= Mahbuba Maqsoodi =

German-Afghan artist

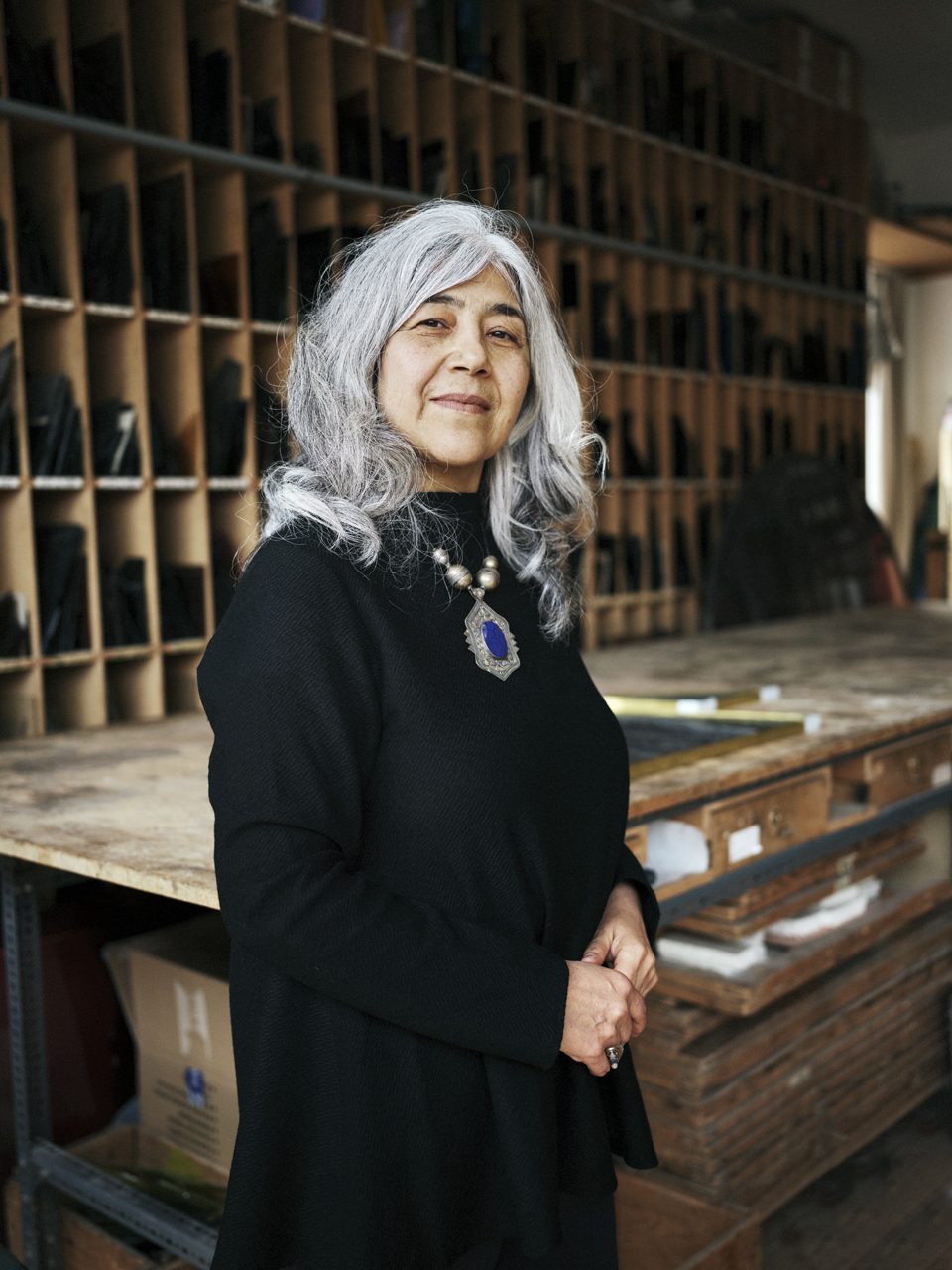
Mahbuba Elham Maqsoodi, 2020 Photo by Dieter Mayr

Mahbuba Elham Maqsoodi (born 1957) is a German-Afghan artist based in Munich, Germany. She is recognized for miniature paintings and painting on glass, including designing 34 stained glass windows for Tholey Abbey in Germany. She is an advocate for women's rights, a published author, and received a PhD in Art History.

== Early life and education ==
Born in Herat, Afghanistan, Mahbuba Elham Maqsoodi is the fourth of seven daughters. Her father, an educator, founded a school for girls. She graduated from high school with a university entrance diploma, and obtained teaching qualifications. She taught chemistry and biology at an all girls high school.

Together with her older sister Afifa, she became politically active. Both sisters were members of the youth wing of a political party which primarily advocated for women's rights in Afghanistan. In 1979, an Islamist extremist assassinated Afifa.

== Artistic life ==
=== Afghanistan (1973 – 1979) ===
Maqsoodi's artistic career began in 1973, when she started studying the art of Persian miniature paintings with Fazl Maqsoodi, whom she later married. At the time, Fazl was a master-class student of Ustad Mohammad Sayed (otherwise known as Mashal). Mashal's organisation was famous across Iran and Afghanistan for its Behzadinian art of miniatures (also known as the "torch of Behzadinian miniature tradition").

Once married, the couple participated in group exhibitions in both Herat and Kabul. One of Maqsoodi's miniatures was added to the collection of Kabul's National Gallery.

=== Russia (1979 – 1994) ===
In 1979, Mahbuba and Fazl Maqsoodi received a scholarship from Afghanistan's Ministry of Culture. Both artists were allowed a course of studies in a foreign country; this led them to Saint Petersburg, Russia. Mahbuba became a scholarship holder at Mukhina Academy of Arts (presently known as the Stieglitz Academy of Arts). In Saint Petersburg, the official socialistic doctrine of arts meant that students had to strictly follow socialist realism.

In 1987 Maqsoodi finished her scholarship with a final thesis at the faculty for ceramics and glass as the best student of the course. Additionally, her academic submission was added to the academy's collection. As a result, both Mahbuba and Fazl Maqsoodi were able to hold an art exhibition, which opened on December 3, 1987, at Arseniy's Morozov Villa, formerly "House of Friendship with Foreign Nations".

After the scholarships ended, there was no chance of return to Afghanistan due to the ongoing civil war. The couple applied for postgraduate scholarships and The Ministry of Culture, for the purpose of research studies, approved both applications. In 1993, Mahbuba completed her studies at the Stieglitz Academy for Arts with a PhD in Art History. Her PhD thesis was entitled: "The tradition of ornaments in contemporary Afghan ceramics".

=== Germany (1994 – present) ===
In 1994, Fazl Maqsoodi had a solo exhibition at Gallery Goethe 53 in Munich, Germany. The exhibition was titled "Afghanistan on fire".

In the years between 2001 and 2012, Maqsoodi's artwork mainly focused on architectural based contractual orders. For her, it meant to professionally adapt the artistic language of the 19th century (Pre-Raphaelite and Romanesque style).

From 2012, she developed her art and gained attention in 2017 with her solo exhibition "GlasKlar" at Munich's Maximilianeum.

In 2018, she participated and won an art competition to design 34 new windows for Germany's oldest Benedict monastery in Tholey. Alongside Maqsoodi, the artist Gerhard Richter was contracted to design 3 of the windows. All of the windows have been fabricated at Bayerische Hofglasmalerei Gustav van Treeck (est. 1887) in Munich, and at Glasmalerei Frese in Saarbrücken.

Maqsoodi has always seen herself as a painter and drawer. For her, painting on glass is part of a wider artistic body of works. The complexity and variety of (hand-made) glass creates a three-dimensionality, which is characteristic for the artist.

== Social commitments ==
From her early years, Maqsoodi has been socially engaged and interested in women's rights. In 2003, she founded the "Afghan Women in Munich" association (a membership corporation). The association's mission is to support women refugees and their families to establish participation in society and to receive adequate information on their rights and duties. The female role in society is of utmost importance for Maqsoodi: "If I don't like something, I will change it. Sometimes unknowingly, but always naturally. I emancipated myself in Afghanistan, and I would like to make life for Afghan women easier."

As a member for many years of the "Alliance of women's associations in Munich", her commitment to institutions like the "Munich advisory committee for foreigners" and the "Munich municipal council commission for integration", has made a great contribution to the process of cultural and social integration. For her social engagement, she received the Bavarian Constitution Medal in silver on December 16, 2013.

== Personal life ==
In 1994 Maqsoodi, her husband, and their two sons were granted political asylum in Munich, Germany. In 2010, Fazl Maqsoodi died from cancer at the age of 60.

Mahbuba Elham Maqsoodi continues to live and work in Munich.

== Book publication ==
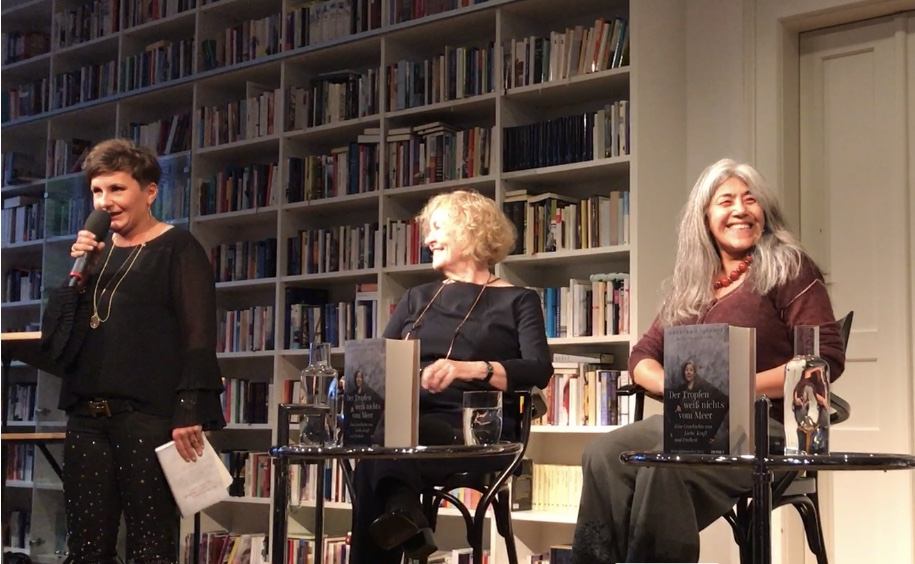
Book reading "Der Tropfen weiß nichts vom Meer", Literaturhaus München, 12.09.2017

=== "Der Tropfen weiß nichts vom Meer" ===
On September 12, 2017, Mahbuba Maqsoodi presented her book "Der Tropfen weiß nichts vom Meer" (The drop knows nothing of the sea) to the public, which she wrote together with her close friend and editor Hanna Diederichs. The autobiographical work includes 77 short stories, divided into three episodes: Afghanistan, Russia, and Germany.

The book was published by Wilhelm Heyne Verlag, Munich, and their publishing group Random House GmbH (ISBN 978-3-453-20156-9).

== Selected exhibitions ==
- 1976: School of Persian Miniature Painting, group exhibition: "Young Herati Artists and the Persian Miniature Painting." (Herat, Afghanistan)
- 1980: Faculty of Fine Arts, University of Kabul, group exhibition: "Modern Painting in Afghanistan" ( Kabul, Afghanistan)
- 1981: Culture Centre Tashkent, group exhibition: "Miniature Paintings, Paintings by Mahbuba Elham Maqsoodi and Fazl Maqsoodi" (Tashkent, Uzbekistan)
- 1985: Academy of Arts, group exhibition; miniature paintings, graphics, paintings, ceramics: "Herat-Leningrad" (Saint Petersburg, Russia)
- 1987: Arseniks Morozov Villa, group exhibition; paintings, graphics, ceramics: "What happened in seven years" (Moscow, Russia)
- 1987 travelling exhibition: "Selected pieces from diploma thesis submitted to the Stieglitz Academy of Arts" (Saint Petersburg, Russia), (Minsk, Belarus), (Warsaw, Poland)
- 1992: MANEGE Art Gallery Sankt Petersburg, group exhibition; "White Porcelain" (Saint Petersburg, Russia)
- 1997: VHS München, group exhibition: "Afghanistan Land voller Hoffnungen?" (Munich, Germany)
- 1999: Kulturzentrum Pasinger Fabrik, group exhibition (Munich, Germany)
- 1999: SOAS Library, group exhibition: "Art from the destroyed Afghanistan" (London, United Kingdom)
- 2000: Museum Fünf Kontinente, group exhibition: "Frieden für Afghanistan" (Munich, Germany)
- 2001: Crypt Gallery St. Martin in the Fields, group exhibition: "Flug in die Freiheit" (London, United Kingdom)
- 2002: Bonn Women's Museum, group exhibition; "Wegziehen" (Bonn, Germany)
- 2003: European Patent Organisation, group exhibition: "Afghanistan die neue Freiheit" (Munich, Germany)
- 2003: Suermondt-Ludwig-Museum, group exhibition: "Ex Orient - Isaak und der weiße Elefant", (Aachen, Germany)
- 2004: Glashalle Gasteig, "Lange Nacht der Frauen" (Munich, Germany)
- 2005: Rheinisches Landesmuseum Bonn, "Afghanistan- meine Hoffnungen, mein Leiden" (Bonn, Germany)
- 2008: Kulturzentrum Trudering, group exhibition "2 künstlerischen Wege" (Munich, Germany)
- 2017: Maximilianeum "GLASKlar" (Munich, Germany)
- 2017: Katharina von Bora Haus: "Kunstwerk des Monats - VIELFALT" (Berg am Starnberg, Germany)
- 2018: Kunstverein Wörth, group exhibition: "EUROPA ohne Grenzen" (Wörth am Rhein, Germany)
- 2019: Nazareth Kirche, "Und ICH!" (Munich, Germany)
- 2020: Kunstraum van Treeck, Malereien und Glasbilder im Rahmen des "First View Neue Künstlerfenster" Mahbuba Maqsoodi und Gerhard Richter für die Benediktinerabtei Tholey, (Munich, Germany)
