= Wand (Wall) =

Painting by Gerhard Richter

- Artist: Gerhard Richter
- Year: 1994
- Catalogue: GRAD 806
- Medium: Oil on canvas
- Dimensions: 240 cm × 240 cm (94 in × 94 in)
- Location: Private collection

Wand (Wall) is an oil painting by Gerhard Richter executed in 1994. It was in Richter's private collection for over 15 years before he sold it to the Wako Works of Art gallery in Tokyo in 2010. It was sold at Sotheby's, London, on 12 February 2014 for £17,442,500.

== Bibliography ==
- Exhibition Catalogue, London, Anthony d'Offay Gallery, Gerhard Richter, 1998, p. 87, no. 806, illustrated in colour
- art Das Kunstmagazin, no. 12, December 1999, front cover, illustrated in colour
- Robert Storr, Gerhard Richter: Malerei, Ostfildern 2002, p. 245, illustrated in colour
- Joost Zwagerman, Transito, Amsterdam/Antwerp 2006, pp. 160–61, illustrated in colour
