= 48 Portraits =

Series of 48 portrait images of Gerhard Richter

48 Portraits is a group of works by the German painter Gerhard Richter. In the years 1971–1972 Richter created a series of portraits of personalities who influenced modernity in a photorealistic manner. They all portray exclusively men. Oriented towards a central imaginary observer, they give the impression of a modern painted frieze of portrait heads. Richter participated in the 1972 edition of the Venice Biennale with this work. They are exhibited in the Museum Ludwig in Cologne as well as in Albertinum Museum in Dresden.

The series includes portraits of the following persons:

top row
(left to right)
- Mihail Sadoveanu (1880–1961)
- Otto Schmeil (1860–1943)
- William James (1842–1910)
- Jean Sibelius (1865–1957)
- Hans Pfitzner (1869–1949)
- Frédéric Joliot-Curie (1900–1958)
- James Chadwick (1891–1974)
- Max Planck (1858–1947)
- James Franck (1882–1964)
- Manuel de Falla (1876–1946)
- Paul Valéry (1871–1945)
- Enrico Fermi (1901–1954)
- Alfred Mombert (1872–1942)
- Bjørnstjerne Bjørnson (1832–1910)
- Giacomo Puccini (1858–1924)
- Saint-John Perse (1887–1975)
- Paul Hindemith (1895–1963)
- Albert Einstein (1879–1955)
- Wilhelm Dilthey (1833–1911)
- Isidor Isaac Rabi (1898–1988)
- François Mauriac (1885–1970)
- Rainer Maria Rilke (1875–1926)
- Karl Manne Siegbahn (1886–1978)
- Anton Webern (1883–1945)
bottom row
(left to right)
- José Ortega y Gasset (1883–1955)
- Gustav Mahler (1860–1911)
- Arrigo Boito (1842–1918)
- Igor Stravinski (1882–1971)
- Pjotr Iljitsch Tschaikowski (1840–1893)
- Herbert George Wells (1866–1946)
- Alfredo Casella (1883–1947)
- Paul Dirac (1902–1984)
- Paul Claudel (1868–1955)
- Nicolai Hartmann (1882–1950)
- Thomas Mann (1875–1955)
- John Dos Passos (1896–1970)
- Patrick Maynard Stuart Blackett (1897–1974)
- Franz Kafka (1883–1924)
- Louis-Victor de Broglie (1892–1987)
- Graham Greene (1904–1991)
- Alfred Adler (1870–1937)
- Hugo von Hofmannsthal (1874–1929)
- Émile Verhaeren (1855–1916)
- Oscar Wilde (1854–1900)
- Anton Bruckner (1824–1896)
- William Somerset Maugham (1874–1965)
- André Gide (1869–1951)
- Rudolf Borchardt (1877–1945)
