= Apocalypse Now (painting) =

1988 painting by Christopher Wool

Apocalypse Now, Christopher Wool, 1988

Apocalypse Now is a 1988 painting by the American artist Christopher Wool, widely regarded as among the most important of his "word paintings" created in the late 1980s. It consists of the words "SELL THE HOUSE SELL THE CAR SELL THE KIDS", stenciled in black, block letters in alkyd enamel on an off-white painted aluminum and steel plate measuring 84 x 72 inches (213.4 x 182.9 cm). The quotation is from the 1979 Francis Ford Coppola movie Apocalypse Now, where it is written in a letter mailed home by a character who has lost his mind in the jungle. (Note: In the 1979 film the full text of the letter, written by Captain Colby, reads "SELL THE HOUSE/SELL THE CAR/SELL THE KIDS/FIND SOMEONE ELSE/FORGET IT!/I'M NEVER COMING ~~HOME~~ BACK/FORGET IT!!!")

The work (a first version of which exists on paper (Note: The 1988 enamel on paper version of Apocalypse Now measures 28.3 × 26.8 in (71.8 x 65.4 cm) and is in the collection of Stephanie Seymour.)) was originally displayed in April 1988 at a collaborative show in the East Village at the 303 Gallery, along with three urinals sculpted by artist Robert Gober. It was purchased, with the urinals, by its first owners Werner and Elaine Dannheisser, who are thought to have paid around $7,500 for the painting (according to a later estimate by Bloomberg Business). "It was probably the painting of the year", said Richard Flood, chief curator of the New Museum, who said its text served as "a kind of late-'80s mantra" in the wake of the 1987 "Black Monday" stock market crash. To critic Kay Larson, the stark formatting and "fractured code" of Wool's syntax in Apocalypse Now conveys a warning of disaster "in the coldest terms" and with "telegraphic urgency". Peter Schjeldahl has written about the "hiccup in comprehension" caused by the elimination of standard spacing and punctuation. The painting is unusual in Wool's output for having a title, and Flood has observed that the word "apocalypse" itself originally connoted "revelation", the disclosure of knowledge and the lifting of a veil.

Apocalypse Now was exhibited in the Whitney Biennial of 1989. After the Museum of Modern Art turned down Elaine Dannheisser's 1996 offer of its donation—at the time, the painting was probably valued at under $80,000, and MOMA already owned a Wool—the painting was owned by a series of prominent collectors, beginning in 1999 when it entered the collection of Donald L. Bryant, Jr. in St. Louis, Missouri. In 2001, according to former Christie's auctioneer Philippe Ségalot, Bryant confided that "my wife hates it. She can’t live with a work that says ‘SELL THE HOUSE SELL THE CAR SELL THE KIDS.’ So do you know anyone who might want to buy it?"

Ségalot engineered a 2001 sale to François Pinault, owner and chairman of Christie's auction house, for approximately $400,000. Pinault sold it four years later to hedge fund manager David Ganek (of Level Global Investors) for approximately $2 million. Ganek was reported to have taken bank loans out against the painting, which changed hands again shortly before a Christie's auction on November 12, 2013, where it sold for $26,485,000 to an unnamed buyer. In its lot description, Christie's described the painting as "timeless and affecting, imposing and arresting" and "of robust relevance today".

The sale of Apocalypse Now broke the previous Christopher Wool auction record of £4,913,250 ($7,758,022) set in February 2012 by Untitled ('Fool'). The record was in turn eclipsed in May 2015 when Untitled ('Riot'), a work Wool painted in 1990, sold for $29,930,000 at Sotheby's. An unnamed European curator told The Art Newspaper that Wool's reputation as a blue-chip "must-have artist" was established by a 2008 limited edition monograph issued by Taschen, but that his market inventory, in relatively short supply, was at risk of being controlled (like that of Jean-Michel Basquiat) by a small, powerful clique of collectors.
