= Tholey Abbey =

Benedictine monastery in Tholey, Saarland, Germany

Coordinates: 49°28′52″N 7°01′52″E

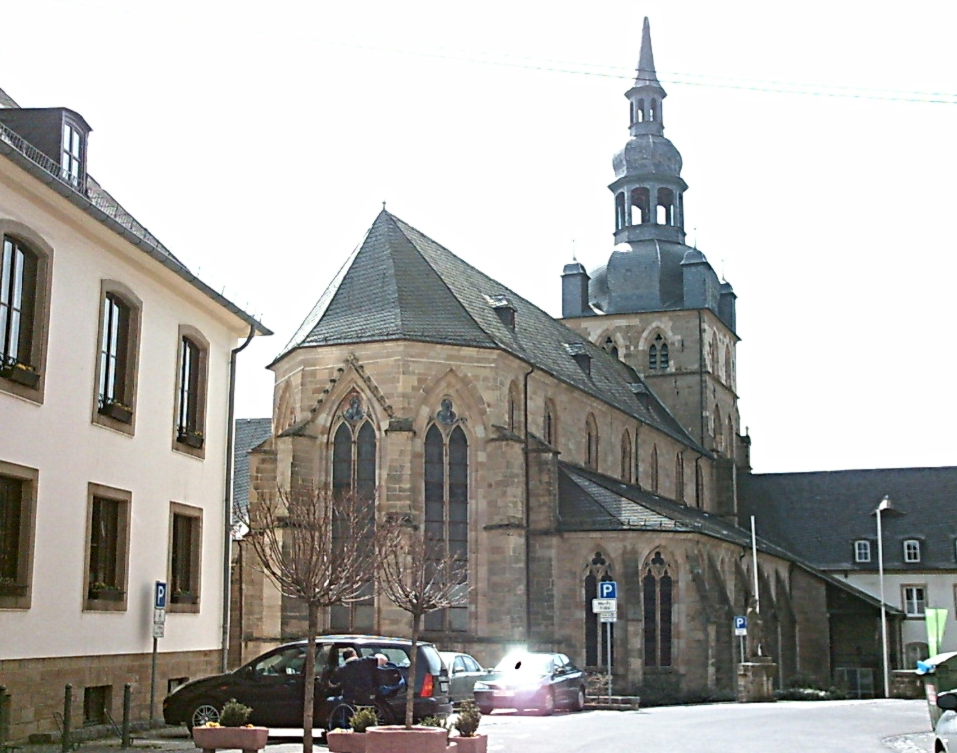

Tholey Abbey (German: Abtei Tholey) in Tholey, in the district of Sankt Wendel in Saarland, Germany, is a Benedictine monastery dedicated to Saint Maurice. It is part of the Beuronese Congregation within the Benedictine Confederation.

== History ==
As early as the 5th and 6th centuries a group of clerics had established themselves here in the Roman ruins. On the instructions of Magnerich, bishop of Trier from 566 to 600, these hermits formed themselves into monastic communities. One of the earliest of such communities, at the foot of the Schaumberg, is said to have had Saint Wendelin as its head, who is thus counted by tradition as the first abbot of Tholey.

The Benedictine history of Tholey is thought to have begun in about 750. At the end of the 15th century the abbey joined the Bursfelde Congregation.

In 1794 during the French Revolution the abbey was plundered and burnt down, and dissolved the same year. In 1798 the remaining buildings were auctioned off. In 1806 they became the property of the municipality, as the parish church and priest's house.

The present abbey was established by the Benedictines in 1949 and settled in 1950 by monks from St. Matthias' Abbey, Trier. The monks work in pastoral care and run the guesthouse and book shop. As of 2020, twelve monks from five nations reside in the monastery.

in 2008, with philanthropic support from Edmund and Ursula Meiser, the chapter house was renovated, and baroque-style pavilion was erected on the grounds of the abbey.

In 2020, the abbey installed stained glass windows created by German artists Gerhard Richter and Mahbuba Maqsoodi. Richter's three windows — with deep reds and blues prevailing on the two outer displays and the central one dominated by radiant gold — are more than 30 feet tall and made to a symmetrical design. Maqsoodi's 34 windows for the church feature figurative images portraying saints and scenes from the Bible.

== Abbots since the re-establishment in 1949 ==
- 1949–1976 Dr. Petrus Borne
- 1977–1981 Hrabanus Heddergott
- 1982–1985 Athanasius Weber (Prior Administrator)
- 1985–2007 Makarios Hebler
- 2008–2025 Mauritius Choriol (until 2014 as Prior Administrator)
- 2025- Wendelinus (Johannes) Naumann
