= Donald L. Bryant Jr. =

American businessman

- Born: June 30, 1942; Mount Vernon, Illinois, United States
- Died: March 1, 2025 (aged 82); Napa, California, United States
- Other name: Don Bryant
- Education: Denison University; Washington University in St. Louis
- Occupations: Vineyard owner Art collector
- Board member of: Formerly on the Board of Trustees of MoMA
- Spouse: Barbara Bryant (1982–2007) Bettina Sulser Bryant (2009)

Donald L. Bryant Junior (June 30, 1942 – March 1, 2025) was an American businessman, art collector, vineyard owner and philanthropist. He was the chairman of The Bryant Group, a St. Louis–based wealth management firm. His Bryant Family Vineyards in Napa, California, produces some of the country's most highly-rated wines.

== Early life and education ==
Bryant graduated from Denison University in Ohio in 1964, and from the Washington University School of Law in 1967.

== Career ==
He owned Bryant Family Vineyard, a boutique winery in Napa, California, and The Bryant Group, an executive compensation and wealth management firm in St. Louis, Missouri. As a vintner, he purchased his first vineyard in the late 1980s and initially replanted it entirely with cabernet sauvignon vines to both reflect the terroir of California and the traditions from Bordeaux.

=== Art collection ===
Bryant moved to London for a year when he was 51 in order to study art history. He toured 47 different museums and employed a curator from Tate Museum to teach him about twentieth century art. He later became a trustee of the Tate; as well as being formerly on the Board of Trustees of MoMA in New York. He has several times been named among the world's top 200 collectors by ARTnews magazine. The Bryant collection includes works by Jasper Johns, Willem de Kooning, Jackson Pollock, Alberto Giacometti, Jean Dubuffet, Robert Rauschenberg, Ellsworth Kelly, and others. An Andy Warhol portrait of Marlon Brando, purchased by Bryant for $5 million just a decade before, was sold by Bryant in 2013 for $23.7 million.

In 1999, Bryant purchased Christopher Wool's painting Apocalypse Now, but sold it two years later to Christie's chairman François Pinault, allegedly because his wife could not live with a work that said "SELL THE HOUSE SELL THE CAR SELL THE KIDS".

== Personal life ==
Bryant's marriage to Barbara Bryant ended in divorce in 2007. The couple had three children. In April 2009, he married Bettina Sulser Bryant, an art consultant and former ballet dancer, with the couple reportedly living in New York.

Bryant died in his Napa home on March 1, 2025, due to natural causes.
