= Abstraktes Bild (809-1) =

1994 painting by Gerhard Richter

- Artist: Gerhard Richter
- Year: 1994
- Dimensions: 225 cm (89 in) × 200 cm (79 in)

Abstraktes Bild (809-1) is a 1994 painting by the Dresden-born artist Gerhard Richter. In the top-ten list of the most expensive paintings by Richter it occupied 6th place in 2013.

Abstraktes Bild (809-1) is the first from a series of four paintings. Abstraktes Bild (809-3) is in the collection of the Tate Gallery. When Eric Clapton brought Abstraktes Bild (809-4) to auction at Christie's in 2013, it sold for US$34,190,757 At the same auction, Abstraktes Bild (809-2) sold for US$3,119,403.

== Provenance ==
The painting was first shown at the exhibition Gerhard Richter: Painting in the Nineties at the Anthony d’Offay Gallery in London where it was purchased by Heiner Pietzsch.

It was exhibited from June to August 2000 in the Dresden castle at the exhibition Dalí, Miró, Picasso… Sammlung Ulla und Heiner Pietzsch, Juni-August 2000. In 2001, Ulla and Heiner Pietzsch brought the painting to auction at Sotheby's in New York where Eric Clapton bought it together with two other Richters for a total of €2,600,000. Christie's auctioned Abstraktes Bild (809-1) on November 12, 2013 where it fetched US$20,885,000.

== Description ==
The abstract painting is painted in the fall colours scarlet, emerald green, gold- end lemon yellow with spots of violet and Prussian blue.

The complicated and tedious, repeatedly interrupted process of its creation remains visible in the picture. The paint stripes or stains, which are quickly and randomly applied with a brush, are drawn down to the lower edge of the picture with the aid of a squeegee on the canvas, they dry, layers of other colours are applied here and there. Again, distributed with the squeegee randomly, they dry again, colour layers are here and there scraped off to the ground. These processes are repeated until the painter considers the painting as completed. The vertical and horizontal lines created by the movement of the board seem to give the picture, with its abundance of colours, a certain structure and convey a certain aspect of calm and harmony. Its creation process remains recognizable in the painting, but at the same time remains "veiled". According to the artist, these paintings are to a considerable extent dependent on chance and often contradict in their final version of his initial image idea.

The painting is signed, numbered and dated on the reverse.

== Bibliography ==
- Gerhard Richter. Catalogue Raisonné 1993-2004. Dusseldorf 2005. P. 270 and 309, Nr. 809–1.
