= Manfred Hürlimann =

Swiss artist

Manfred Hürlimann (born 29 September 1958) is a Swiss painter.

== Life ==
From 1977 to 1979 Hürlimann completed an apprenticeship as a church painter, after which he began his academic training. Until 1986 he studied painting with Günter Voglsamer at the Academy of Fine Arts in Nuremberg. In 1983, Hürlimann was named a master student and in 1984 received a scholarship to the Summer Academy in Salzburg with Wolf Vostell. In 1988 he received the Debutant Prize of the Bavarian State Ministry for Education, Culture, Science and the Arts. In 1992 he was awarded the art prize of the district of Middle Franconia. In 2005, he won first prize in the Nuremberg News Art Prize.

At the Leipzig Book Fair in 1999, together with the Spätlese publishing house, he presented his catalog entitled: Emptiness, Death and Life. In 2001, the Bayerische Rundfunk filmed with him the studio visit with Manfred Hürlimann. The film premiered at the Nuremberg Opera House and was subsequently broadcast on television.

== Work ==
Hürlimann has a style of painting that refuses all fashions and trends. In the works of Manfred Hürlimann there are reflections on ancient mythology, but also on the medieval mythological world. The painter also draws on literary models by Dante, Charles Baudelaire or Sarah Kane.

Hürlimann paints human images on expansive wall and ceiling paintings, which are often laid out as diptychs.
