= Charline von Heyl =

German abstract painter (born 1960)

- Born: 1960 (age 65–66); Mainz, West Germany
- Known for: Painting
- Movement: Abstract

Charline von Heyl (born 1960) is a German abstract painter. She also works with drawing, printmaking, and collage. She moved to the United States in the 1990s, and has studios in New York City and in Marfa, Texas.

== Life ==
Von Heyl was born in Mainz and spent her childhood in Bonn. Her father was a lawyer, her mother a psychologist. She studied painting at the Hochschule für bildende Künste of Hamburg under Jörg Immendorff, and at the Kunstakademie Düsseldorf under Fritz Schwegler. In the mid-1990s she moved to New York City, where she has a studio in the Brooklyn Navy Yard.

Since 1997, Charline von Heyl has been married to fellow artist Christopher Wool.

== Work ==
In 2005, von Heyl's exhibition Concentrations 48: Charline von Heyl was held at the Dallas Museum of Art in Dallas, Texas, USA, and in 2009, her work was exhibited in Le jour de boire est arrivé held at Le Consortium, a contemporary art center in Dijon, France.

In 2011–2012, von Heyl had two major traveling retrospectives. Charline von Heyl, Now or Else started at the Tate Liverpool in Liverpool, England and subsequently traveled to the Kunsthalle Nürnberg in Nuremberg, Germany and the Bonner Kunstverein in Bonn, Germany. A second show, Charline von Heyl, was exhibited within the United States at the Institute of Contemporary Art, Boston and the Institute of Contemporary Art, Philadelphia.

In 2018, the Hirshhorn Museum and Sculpture Garden exhibited the largest U.S. museum survey ever of von Heyl's work. Featuring more than thirty large-scale paintings, Charline von Heyl: Snake Eyes was extended due to its popularity at the museum.

In 2024, von Heyl was among the 18 artists selected by the Port Authority of New York and New Jersey to create installations for John F. Kennedy International Airport’s new Terminal 6, set to open in 2026.

Her work was included in the 2024 exhibition Making Their Mark: Works from the Shah Garg Collection at the Berkeley Art Museum and Pacific Film Archive (BAMPFA).

== Reception ==
Von Heyl was one of six finalists for the 2014 Hugo Boss Prize.
