= Bryant Family Vineyard =

Coordinates: 38.484348°N 122.340211°W

Bryant Estate
- Location: St. Helena, California (Pritchard Hill), USA
- Appellation: St. Helena AVA
- Founded: 1986
- First vintage: 1992
- Key people: Donald L. Bryant Jr., Founder; Bettina S. Bryant, Proprietor & President; Kathryn Carothers, Winemaker; Michel Rolland, Consulting Enologist
- Known for: Bryant Family Vineyard Cabernet; BETTINA
- Varietals: Cabernet Sauvignon, Merlot, Cabernet Franc, Petit Verdot
- Tasting: not available for tastings or tours
- Website: www.bryantwines.com

Bryant Family Vineyard is a California wine estate in the Napa Valley, founded by businessman Donald L. Bryant Jr.

Known for their 100% Bryant Family Vineyard Cabernet Sauvignon wines grown on their Pritchard Hill estate, Bryant Estate was one of the original cult wines to emerge during the early 1990s, along with wineries such as Screaming Eagle and Harlan Estate. Low production levels and high demand for the wines have driven prices to the upper echelon of wines produced in the United States.

As of 2009, Bryant Estate produces two additional labels, "Bettina" and "DB4". Bettina is a parallel wine to Bryant Family Vineyard, DB4 is a second wine, made of declassified wine from both Bettina and Bryant Family Vineyard labels.

== History ==
In 1985, Bryant purchased the current site of the vineyard and winery with the intention of building a home. After learning that the site held excellent potential for grape growing, the decision was made to plant a vineyard at the location. The first vintage was released in 1992 with winemaker Helen Turley at the helm. Through the 1990s, the wines became part of the cult wine phenomenon, propelling Bryant Family Vineyard into cult winery status along with a number of other Napa Valley wineries, driving up prices and demand. The 1993, 1994, 1995, 1996 and 1997 wines scored 97, 98, 99, 99 and 100 points, respectively, on Robert Parker's Wine Advocate, thus solidifying the winery's status as one of the top Cabernet Sauvignon producers in the United States.

Critic Robert Parker Jr., has remarked about Bryant Estate, "The wine from this hillside vineyard near Napa's Pritchard Hill, has already become mythical (1992 was the debut vintage). This is a wine of world-class quality, and is certainly as complete and potentially complex as any first-growth Bordeaux...It is not too much to suggest that in the future, Bryant's Pritchard Hill Cabernet Sauvignon might well be one of the wines that redefines greatness in Cabernet Sauvignon." Critic Antonio Galloni, who has taken over Robert Parker Jr.'s role in scoring California wines for the Wine Advocate as of 2011, has stated, "Bryant is without question one of the most spectacular vineyards in Napa Valley. I don’t see any reason why the Cabernets that emerge from this property shouldn't be among the top 5-10 wines in the valley each and every year".

== Production ==
Bryant Estate overlooks Lake Hennessey and has approximately 13 acres under vine, all planted to 100% Cabernet Sauvignon. The wine itself is called "Bryant Family Vineyard." Bettina wine is composed of Cabernet Sauvignon, Merlot, Cabernet Franc and Petit Verdot from some of David Abreu's vineyards. DB4 is the second wine for Bryant Family, consisting of declassified wine from Bryant Family Vineyard and Bettina.
