= Christopher Wool =

American painter

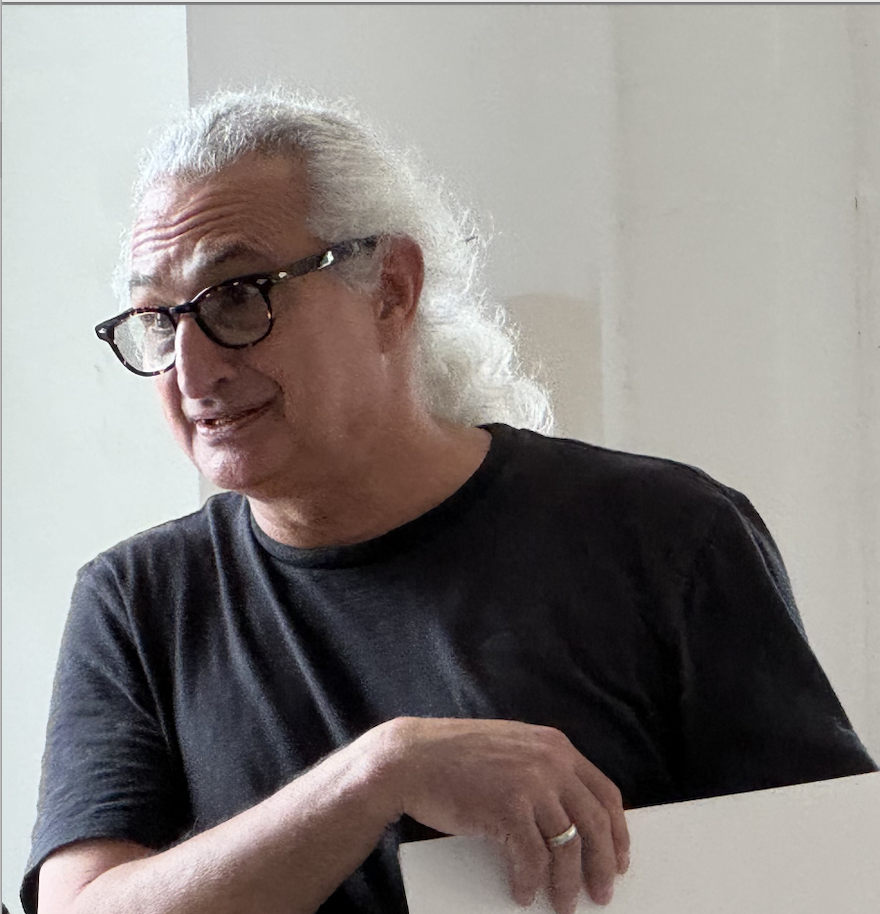
- Christopher Wool in New York, 2024
- Born: September 16, 1955 (age 71); Chicago, US
- Movement: Abstract Art
- Partner: Charline von Heyl
- Awards: Wolfgang Hahn Prize, amfAR's Award
- Website: https://wool735.com

Christopher Wool (born 1955) is an American artist. Since the 1980s, Wool's art has incorporated post-conceptual ideas.

== Early life and career ==
Wool was born in Chicago, Illinois to Glorye and Ira Wool, a molecular biologist and a psychiatrist. He grew up in Chicago. In 1973, he moved to New York City and enrolled in Studio School studies with Jack Tworkov and Harry Krame. After a short period of formal training as a painter at the New York Studio School, he dropped out and immersed himself in the world of underground film and music. Between 1980 and 1984, he worked as part-time studio assistant to Joel Shapiro.

== Work ==
Wool is best known for his paintings of large, black, stenciled letters on white canvases. Wool began to create word paintings in the late 1980s, reportedly after having seen graffiti on a brand new white truck. Writing in 2000, for The New York Times, Ken Johnson explains, "in the 1980s, Christopher Wool was doing a Neo-Pop sort of painting using commercial rollers to apply decorative patterns to white panels. One day he saw a new white truck violated by the spray-painted words 'sex' and 'luv.' Mr. Wool made his own painting using those words and went on to make paintings with big, black stenciled letters saying things like 'Run Dog Run' or 'Sell the House, Sell the Car, Sell the Kids.' The paintings captured the scary, euphoric mood of a high-flying period."

At 303 Gallery in 1988, Wool and fellow artist Robert Gober presented a collaborative exhibition and installation which included Wool's seminal text-based painting, Apocalypse Now (1988). The work features words from a famous line in Francis Ford Coppola's film Apocalypse Now, based on the Joseph Conrad novel Heart of Darkness. From the early 1990s through the present, the silkscreen has been a primary tool in Wool's practice. In his abstract paintings Wool brings together figures and the disfigured, drawing and painting, casual impulses and well thought-out ideas. He draws lines on the canvas with a spray gun and then, directly after, wipes them out again with a rag drenched in solvent to give a new picture in which clear lines have to stand their own against smeared surfaces.

Although Wool is best known as a painter, he has also amassed a large body of black-and-white photographs taken at night in the streets between the Lower East Side and Chinatown. Originally begun in the mid-1990s, the project was resumed and completed in 2002. In 2004, Holzwarth Publications published East Broadway Breakdown, a book reproducing all 160 photographs.

In 2012, Wool contributed the set design for Moving Parts, a piece conceived by Benjamin Millepied's L.A. Dance Project.

=== Artist books ===
- Can your monkey do the dog, Christopher Wool & Josh Smith. 168 pages, 27,9 x 21,5 cm. Limited edition of 1000 copies and 300 artist's proofs. Produced and published in 2007 by mfc-michèle didier.

== Exhibitions ==
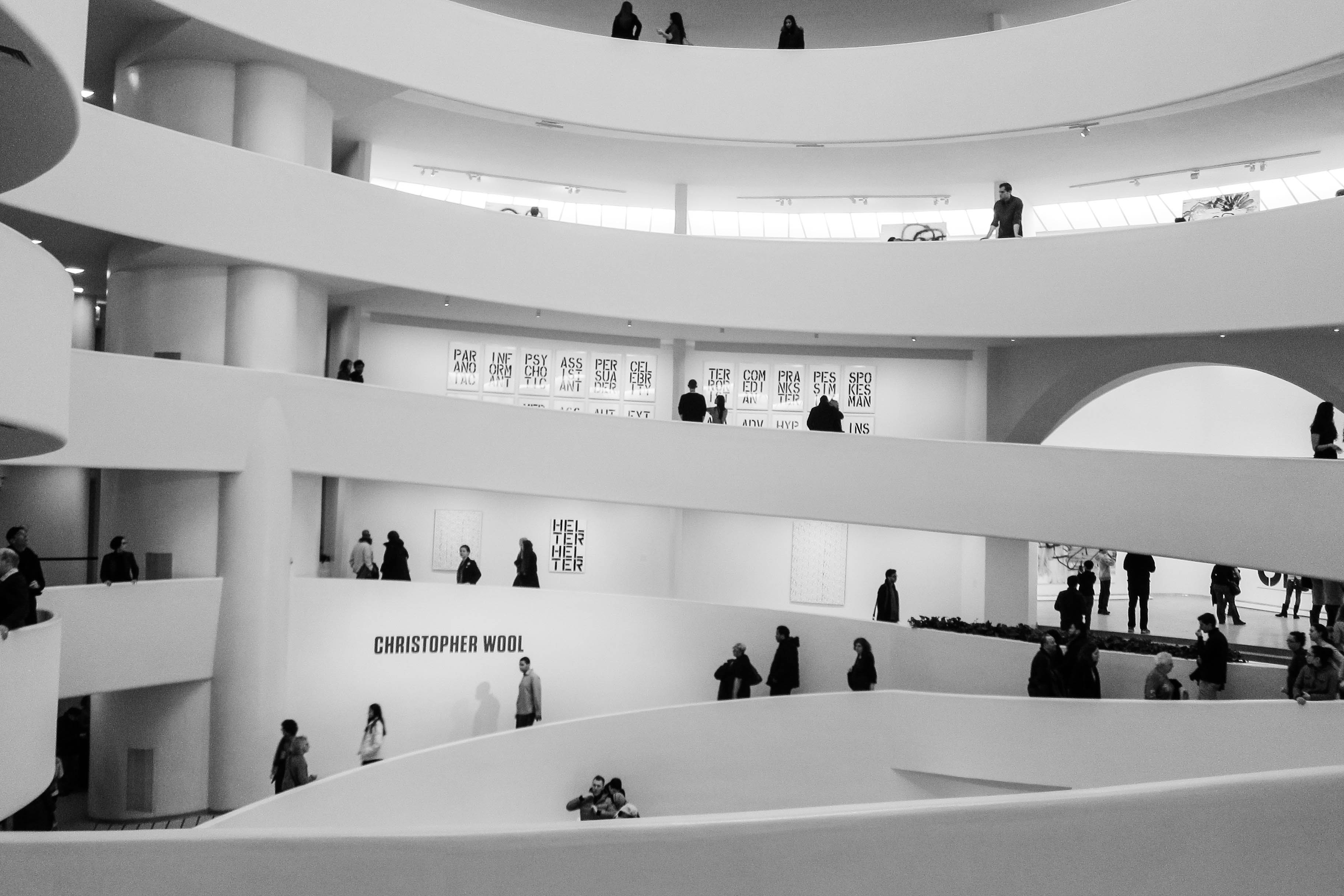
Christopher Wool – Personal exhibition at Guggenheim Museum, 2014

In 1998, a retrospective of Wool's work was mounted at the Museum of Contemporary Art, Los Angeles, an exhibition which then traveled to the Carnegie Museum of Art in Pittsburgh and Kunsthalle Basel in Switzerland. In 2009 he had an exhibition at the Gesellschaft für Moderne Kunst am Museum Ludwig in Köln, Germany and in 2012 at the Musée d'Art Moderne de la Ville de Paris. From October 25, 2013 to January 22, 2014, a retrospective of Wool's work was exhibited at The Guggenheim Museum in New York City, and traveled to the Art Institute of Chicago in the spring of 2014.

== Recognition ==
Wool has been named a Fellow of the American Academy in Rome (1989), served as a DAAD Berlin Artist-in-Residence (1992), and received the Wolfgang Hahn Prize. In 2010, he was honored with amfAR's Award of Excellence for Artistic Contributions to the Fight Against AIDS.

== Art market ==
In 2006, he had a solo exhibition at Gagosian Gallery, Beverly Hills.

Wool's Word paintings made between the late 1980s and early 2000s are his most sought-after pieces on the art market; as of 2013, seven "word" works feature in Wool's top ten auction sales. At Christie's London in February 2012, Untitled (1990), a later word painting bearing the broken word FOOL, sold for £4.9 million ($7.7 million). In November 2013, art dealer Christophe van de Weghe bought Apocalypse Now (1988) for $26.4 million on behalf of a client at Christie's New York. Wool's monumental black and white word painting Riot (1990) sold for $29.9 million at Sotheby's New York in 2015. That same month, Untitled (1990), made with alkyd and graphite on paper and featuring the words 'RUN DOG EAT DOG RUN', realized $2.4 million, the record for a work on paper by the artist.

== Personal life ==
He lives and works in New York City and Marfa, Texas, together with his wife and fellow painter Charline von Heyl.
