= Deaths in August 2025 =

The following is a list of notable deaths in August 2025.

Entries for each day are listed alphabetically by surname. A typical entry lists information in the following sequence:

- Name, age, country of citizenship at birth, subsequent country of citizenship (if applicable), reason for notability, cause of death (if known), and reference.

== August 2025 ==
=== 1 ===
- Rahaman Ali, 82, American boxer.
- Henry Arklin, 97, American politician, member of the California State Assembly (1969–1971).
- Arif Babayev, 87, Azerbaijani singer.
- Jack W. Batman, 81, American theatre producer (Pippin, On the Town, Carousel), Tony winner (2013), pancreatic cancer.
- Oleksandr Berestianyi, 70, Ukrainian poet.
- Vasanthi Devi, 86, Indian academic administrator, vice-chancellor of Manonmaniam Sundaranar University (1992–1998), cardiac arrest.
- Daniel Divinsky, 83, Argentine lawyer and publisher (Ediciones de la Flor).
- Fleg, 62, Canadian editorial cartoonist, pancreatic cancer.
- Romano Forleo, 91, Italian politician, senator (1993–1994).
- Reg Gaffley, 97, South African Olympic weightlifter (1956).
- Frank Grimes, 78, Irish actor (A Bridge Too Far, Strumpet City, Coronation Street).
- Trevor Haynes, 95, Zambian Olympic long-distance runner.
- Linda Hodes, 94, American dancer.
- Maryam Hosseinian, 50, Iranian writer.
- Jonathan Kaplan, 77, American film and television director (The Accused, Over the Edge, ER), liver cancer.
- Maeve Kelly, 95, Irish writer and activist.
- Tanel Kerikmäe, 55, Estonian lawyer.
- Koji Kinutani, 82, Japanese Yōga painter.
- Ruedi Külling, 90, Swiss graphic designer and art director.
- Ira Lember, 99, Estonian writer.
- John Robert Middlemas, 89, American politician, member of the Florida House of Representatives (1966–1970).
- Jack Morava, 80, American mathematician (Morava K-theory).
- Dariush Mostafavi, 80, Iranian football player (national team) and executive, chairman of Persepolis (2008–2009) and the IRIFF (1994–1997).
- Aribert Munzner, 95, German-American abstract painter.
- Kalabhavan Navas, 51, Indian actor (Hitler Brothers, Junior Mandrake, Mattupetti Machan) and comedian.
- José Paes, 79, Brazilian-born Ecuadorian footballer (Portuguesa, Barcelona, Ecuador national team).
- Glòria Rognoni, 81, Spanish actress, playwright and theatre director.
- Zdenko Roter, 98, Slovenian sociologist.
- Jeannie Seely, 85, American singer ("Don't Touch Me", "I'll Love You More (Than You Need)", "Wish I Didn't Have to Miss You"), Grammy winner (1967), intestinal infection.
- Harold Palmer Smith Jr., 89, American academic.
- Yuri Yeryomin, 81, Russian theatre director.
- Zhou Heng, 95, Chinese physicist, member of the Chinese Academy of Sciences.

=== 2 ===
- Julio Alcázar, 82, Spanish actor (Marielena, Toda mujer, Sabor a ti).
- Jean-Pierre Allali, 85, Tunisian-born French academic, writer, and journalist.
- Michal Blažek, 69, Czech sculptor.
- Uta-Renate Blumenthal, 89, German-born American medievalist.
- Madhan Bob, 71, Indian actor (Magalir Mattum, Gopura Deepam, Ayya) and comedian, cancer.
- Gérard Chaillou, 79, French actor (Caméra Café).
- Tõnis Erilaid, 81, Estonian journalist.
- Norman Eshley, 80, English actor (George and Mildred, See No Evil, Brookside), cancer.
- Walker Evans, 86, American racing driver (NASCAR Craftsman Truck Series).
- Charlie Flannagan, 91, Australian footballer (Richmond).
- José Roberto Guzzo, 82, Brazilian journalist (Veja), heart attack.
- Kelley Mack, 33, American actress (The Walking Dead), glioma.
- Greg O'Connell, 83, American property developer.
- Ariovaldo Umbelino de Oliveira, 78, Brazilian geographer.
- Edson Peri, 97, Brazilian Olympic water polo player (1952).
- Vladimir Popov, 63, Russian Greco-Roman wrestler, Olympic bronze medallist (1988).
- Jim Redpath, 88, Canadian mining engineer.
- Hays Hamilton Rockwell, 88, American Episcopal prelate, bishop of Missouri (1992–2002).
- Ross Ariffin, 63, Malaysian composer and record producer.
- M. K. Sanu, 96, Indian writer and literary critic, pneumonia.
- Anwar Seyidov, 76, Azerbaijani lawyer.
- Bernard Springsteel, 94, American illustrator and sculptor.
- Vicky Tafoya, 57, American singer-songwriter, colon cancer.
- Howie Tee, 61, English-born American DJ and record producer.
- Dmitry Vasilyev, 61, Russian herpetologist.
- Peter Veselovský, 60, Slovak ice hockey player (TJ VSŽ Košice, Hockey Club de Caen, Dunaújvárosi Acélbikák).
- Hilary Weston, 83, Irish-Canadian fashion industry executive (Selfridges) and lieutenant governor of Ontario (1997–2002).

=== 3 ===
- Daayiee Abdullah, 71, American Muslim imam.
- Elchin Afandiyev, 82, Azerbaijani writer and politician.
- György Alexa, 67, Hungarian politician, MP (2006–2010).
- M. Shamsher Ali, 87, Bangladeshi astrophysicist and academic administrator, president of the BAS (2004–2012), vice-chancellor of BOU (1992–1996) and SEU (2002–2010).
- Satyapal Anand, 94, Indian-American poet and writer.
- Loni Anderson, 79, American actress (WKRP in Cincinnati, All Dogs Go to Heaven, A Night at the Roxbury), uterine leiomyosarcoma.
- Nando Angelini, 91, Italian actor (Bloody Pit of Horror, The Seventh Grave, The Three Faces).
- Sam Backo, 64, Australian rugby league player (Canberra Raiders, Brisbane Broncos, national team), melioidosis.
- Sue Bender, 91, American author.
- Christopher Calladine, 90, British engineer.
- Lori Cannon, 74, American LGBT activist and AIDS awareness advocate.
- Federico Caputi, 75, Italian football player (Taranto FC, Latina, Pescara) and manager.
- Joseph Daley, 75, American jazz musician and composer.
- Fajar Adriyanto, 55, Indonesian air force officer and pilot, plane crash.
- Elmira Gevorgyan, 93, Armenian physician.
- François Gouges, 83, French pétanque player.
- Michel Gratton, 86, Canadian politician, Quebec MNA (1972–1989), Quebec minister of tourism (1987–1989).
- Sylvain Hanquez, 67, French footballer (Abbeville).
- James Hepburne-Scott, 78, British forester, glioblastoma.
- Cho-yun Hsu, 94, Taiwanese-American historian and sinologist.
- Rhoda Kalema, 96, Ugandan politician, MP (1994–1996).
- Kiril Kavadarkov, 81, Bulgarian actor.
- Jane Lancaster, 89, American anthropologist.
- Fritz Lobinger, 96, German Roman Catholic prelate, bishop of Aliwal (1987–2004).
- Giuseppe Malandrino, 94, Italian Roman Catholic prelate, bishop of Acireale (1979–1998) and Noto (1998–2007).
- David Mangelsdorf, 67, American biologist and chemist.
- Chhering Mutup, 80, Indian army officer.
- Ulli Potofski, 73, German sports journalist and television presenter.
- Dame Stella Rimington, 90, British intelligence officer, director general of MI5 (1992–1995).
- Byron Rogers, 83, Welsh journalist, essayist and historian.
- Margaret W. Rossiter, 81, American historian and writer (Isis).
- Tom Sawyer, Baron Sawyer, 82, British trade unionist and politician, member of the House of Lords (since 1998).
- Ercole Spada, 88, Italian car designer (Alfa Romeo 2600, Volvo GTZ, Ford GT70).
- Deoroop Teemal, 68, Trinidadian politician, senator (since 2018).
- Protais Zigiranyirazo, 87, Rwandan businessman and politician, governor of Ruhengeri (1974–1989).

=== 4 ===
- James Barrington, 65, English cricketer.
- Marco Bonamico, 68, Italian basketball player (Virtus Bologna, Mens Sana Siena), Olympic silver medallist (1980).
- Tor Åge Bringsværd, 85, Norwegian writer.
- Wolfgang Buresch, 84, German puppeteer.
- Laurent Chu Văn Minh, 81, Vietnamese Roman Catholic prelate, auxiliary bishop of Hanoi (2008–2019).
- Dominique Collignon-Maurin, 76, French actor.
- Don Connellan, 51, Irish Gaelic football player (Roscommon) and manager (Moycullen).
- Roland Courteau, 82, French politician, senator (1980–2020).
- Paul Vincent Davis, 90, American puppeteer.
- Miloš Dvořák, 86, Czech actor.
- M. Harun-Ar-Rashid, 75, Bangladeshi military officer, chief of army staff (2000–2002), brain haemorrhage.
- Sir Leo Hielscher, 98, Australian public servant, namesake of Sir Leo Hielscher Bridges.
- Mike Hill, 86, American golfer (Senior PGA Tour).
- Arnfinn Hofstad, 91, Norwegian oil and paper industry executive, CEO of Norske Skog (1982–1994) and acting chairman of Statoil (1996).
- Billy Howton, 95, American football player (Green Bay Packers, Cleveland Browns, Dallas Cowboys).
- Leland Kleinsasser, 90, American politician, member of the South Dakota Senate (1981–1988).
- Else Lidegaard, 92, Danish journalist (DR).
- Maurice McGregor, 105, South African-born Canadian cardiologist.
- Jane Morgan, 101, American singer ("Fascination", "The Day the Rains Came", "Two Different Worlds").
- Mario Moronta, 76, Venezuelan Roman Catholic prelate, bishop of Los Teques (1995–1999) and San Cristóbal (1999–2024).
- George Morrison, 102, Irish documentary filmmaker.
- Talgat Musabayev, 74, Kazakh cosmonaut (Soyuz TM-19, Soyuz TM-27, Soyuz TM-32) and politician, senator (2017–2023).
- Antonio Oteiza, 99, Spanish sculptor.
- Itamar Prat, 92, Israeli poet.
- Terry Reid, 75, English rock singer (Peter Jay and the Jaywalkers), complications from cancer.
- Derlis Rodríguez, 45, Paraguayan lawyer and politician, deputy (since 2023), heart attack.
- Shanawas, 71, Indian actor (Aasha, Mylanji, Irattimadhuram).
- Eldar Shengelaia, 92, Georgian film director (The White Caravan, Unusual Exhibition, Blue Mountains) and politician, MP (1990–2004).
- Song Young-gyu, 55, South Korean actor.
- Shibu Soren, 81, Indian politician, four-time MP, three-time chief minister of Jharkhand and three-time minister of coal.
- Ban Ziad Tariq, 34, Iraqi psychiatrist and TikToker.
- Peter Temin, 87, American economist and economic historian.
- Wang Yousheng, 96, Chinese engineer.
- James Whale, 74, British radio personality (Radio Aire, Talksport, talkRADIO) and television presenter, kidney cancer.

=== 5 ===
- Doyin Abiola, 82, Nigerian journalist and editor.
- Suzanne Adams, 83, American realtor, blunt injury of head with neck compression.
- Selçuk Alagöz, 81, Turkish singer.
- Santhosh Balaraj, 34, Indian actor (Kempa, Ganapa, Kariya 2), complications from jaundice.
- Minnie Lou Bradley, 93, American Hall of Fame cattle rancher.
- Salvador Chuliá Hernández, 81, Spanish composer.
- Jorge Costa, 53, Portuguese football player (Porto, national team), manager (AVS) and executive, cardiac arrest.
- Christophe de Menil, 92, American heiress and costume designer.
- Keïta Fatoumata Diallo, 82, Malian archivist, first lady (1962–1968).
- Alexandr Grishin, 47, Russian sports commentator.
- Anthony Leonard Harris, 90, British geologist, president of Geological Society of London (1990–1992).
- Tomohiko Hashimoto, 47, Japanese professional wrestler (DDT), cancer.
- Ion Iliescu, 95, Romanian politician, president (1989–1996, 2000–2004), state councillor (1979–1980), and five-time MP, lung cancer.
- Col Joye, 89, Australian Hall of Fame singer and business manager (Bee Gees, Andy Gibb).
- Glorya Kaufman, 95, American philanthropist.
- Ove Kindvall, 82, Swedish footballer (IFK Norrköping, Feyenoord, national team).
- Nancy King, 85, American jazz singer.
- Parviz Koozehkanani, 96, Iranian footballer (Taj, Bayer Leverkusen, national team).
- John Laband, 78, South African historian and writer.
- Robin Lakoff, 82, American linguist.
- Enrico Lanzi, 72, Italian football player (Perugia, Campobasso, Paganese) and manager.
- Leonard Lopate, 84, American radio personality (WKCR, WNYC), complications from amyotrophic lateral sclerosis.
- Jay Lorsch, 92, American business theorist.
- Satya Pal Malik, 79, Indian politician, MP (1980–1991), governor of Jammu and Kashmir (2018–2019) and Meghalaya (2020–2022), kidney disease.
- Enriqueta Maroni, 98, Argentine human rights activist (Mothers of Plaza de Mayo).
- Stanley McGeagh, 88, Northern Irish actor (Doctor Who, UFO, Gandhi).
- Morton Meyerson, 87, American computer industry executive, namesake of Morton H. Meyerson Symphony Center.
- Frank Mill, 67, German footballer (Borussia Mönchengladbach, Borussia Dortmund, West Germany national team), world champion (1990), complications from a heart attack.
- Mykola Nechyporuk, 72, Ukrainian scientist.
- Kenth Olsson, 79, Swedish hurdler (IFK Helsingborg).
- Luis Ortiz Quiroga, 91, Chilean lawyer.
- Angelo Maria Ricci, 79, Italian comics artist (Diabolik, Martin Mystère, Tiramolla).
- Snyder Rini, 77, Solomon Islands politician, prime minister (2006), MP (since 1997).
- Vladimir Safronov, 84, Russian actor.
- Calvin Seerveld, 94, American academic.
- Mick Tilse, 67, Australian rugby league player (Canberra Raiders).
- Francine Van Hove, 83, French contemporary painter.
- Lesley B. Wells, 87, American jurist, judge of the U.S. District Court for the Northern District of Ohio (1994–2015).
- Lloyd A. Williams, 80, American community leader, prostate cancer.
- Ofer Yaakobi, 64, Israeli basketball player (Hapoel Holon, Hapoel Tel Aviv, national team).
- Perry Yaney, 94, American physicist.
- Shidrak Yousif, 83, Iraqi footballer (national team).
- Boris Yukhananov, 67, Russian theatre director, heart failure.
- Vladimiro Zagrebelsky, 85, Italian jurist, justice of the European Court of Human Rights (2001–2010).

=== 6 ===
- Juliet Ace, 87, Welsh television writer (EastEnders, The District Nurse).
- Mario Agüero, 68, Argentine roller hockey player (HC Liceo).
- Đorđe Andrijašević, 94, Serbian basketball player (Crvena zvezda, Pallacanestro Pavia) and coach (Olympique Antibes).
- Gianni Berengo Gardin, 94, Italian photographer (Morire di classe).
- Christopher H. Bidmead, 84, English television writer (Doctor Who) and journalist.
- Volodymyr Bilotserkovets, 25, Ukrainian footballer (Zorya Luhansk).
- Sallie Bingham, 88, American author, stroke.
- Franco Casella, 52, Venezuelan politician, deputy (2016–2021), heart attack.
- Mário Júlio de Almeida Costa, 97, Portuguese academic and jurist, president of the Corporative Chamber (1973–1974).
- David Dale, 77, Australian author and journalist.
- Mustafa Demir, 64, Turkish architect and politician, MP (2002–2015), minister of public works and housing (2009–2011), and mayor of Samsun (2019–2024).
- Alain de Dieuleveult, 99, French historian.
- Peter Elliott, 81, Australian Roman Catholic prelate, auxiliary bishop of Melbourne (2007–2018).
- Stanislav Filipenko, 87, Ukrainian circus artist.
- Ives Goddard, 84, American linguist.
- Phil Latreille, 87, Canadian ice hockey player (New York Rangers).
- Jon Miyahara, 83, American actor (Superstore).
- Margarita Nava, 79, Mexican Olympic equestrian (1984).
- Job Ndugai, 62, Tanzanian politician, member (since 2000) and speaker (2015–2022) of the National Assembly.
- Suleiman Obeid, 41, Palestinian footballer (Shabab Al-Am'ari, national team), shot.
- Eddie Palmieri, 88, American pianist and composer, nine-time Grammy Award winner.
- Sylvio Perlstein, Belgian-Brazilian art collector.
- Krastyo Ralenkov, 60, Bulgarian poet, cancer.
- Rajat Kanta Ray, 79, Indian historian.
- Doris Lockhart Saatchi, 88, American art collector.
- Barnett Shepherd, 87, American historian.
- Aida Tağızada, 91, Azerbaijani academic and musicologist.
- Lionel Taylor, 89, American football player (Denver Broncos, Houston Oilers) and coach (England Monarchs).
- R. Dean Tice, 97, American army lieutenant general.
- Anatoliy Tomkiv, 71, Ukrainian writer and journalist.
- André Tronc, 96, French curler.
- Leonid Yandakov, 91, Russian journalist and playwright.
- Notable Ghanaians killed in the Ghanaian Air Force Harbin Z-9 crash:
  - Ibrahim Murtala Muhammed, 50, minister for environment, science, technology and innovation (since 2025) and MP (since 2021)
  - Limuna Mohammed Muniru, 57, Northern regional minister
  - Edward Omane Boamah, 49, minister for communications (2013–2017) and defence (since 2025)
  - Samuel Sarpong, 67, Ashanti regional minister

=== 7 ===
- Anthony Irvine Adams, 89, Australian public health physician, chief medical officer (1988–1997).
- Ümit Aktan, 76, Turkish sports commentator, journalist and author.
- Ramón Bayés, 94, Spanish psychologist.
- François Chaslin, 76, French architect.
- Juan Chavetta, 55, Argentine illustrator and writer, cancer.
- Choy Weng Yang, 95, Singaporean artist and curator.
- Jasem Delavari, 38, Iranian boxer, cancer.
- Nemanja Đurić, 89, Serbian basketball player (Crvena zvezda, Reyer Venezia) and coach (Crvena zvezda).
- Lucia Efrim, 57, Romanian journalist.
- Robbie Ellis, 82, American professional wrestler.
- Rosa Gauditano, 70, Brazilian photographer, heart attack.
- Tony Hadden, 89, Northern Irish Gaelic footballer (Newry Shamrocks, Down).
- Heinz Hardt, 88, German politician, member of the Landtag of North Rhine-Westphalia (1970–2005).
- Rich Hinton, 78, American baseball player (Chicago White Sox).
- Sonya Klopfer, 90, American Olympic figure skater (1952).
- Nana Konadu Yiadom III, 98, Ghanaian traditional ruler, Asantehemaa (since 2017).
- Wolfgang Kuhlmann, 85, German philosopher (Goethe University, RWTH Aachen University).
- Jim Lovell, 97, American astronaut (Gemini 12, Apollo 8, Apollo 13).
- Antony Maitland, 90, British children's author and illustrator, cancer.
- Dionysios Mantalos, 72, Greek Orthodox prelate, metropolitan bishop of Corinth (since 2006), cancer.
- Luc Misson, 72, Belgian lawyer (Bosman ruling).
- Ibrahim Musa, Nigerian politician, senator (2011–2015).
- Myint Swe, 74, Burmese politician, acting president (since 2021), first vice-president (since 2016), and chief minister of Yangon Region (2011–2016), complications from Parkinson's disease.
- Osvaldo Piro, 88, Argentine bandoneonist and conductor.
- Jean-Louis Riguet, 78, French writer.
- Mykola Tabola, 72, Ukrainian oncologist.
- James Vrentas, 89, American chemical engineer.

=== 8 ===
- Eugenio Baena Calvo, 71, Colombian journalist, cardiac complications.
- Judy Bailey, 89, New Zealand-Australian pianist.
- León Balter, 97, Argentine journalist.
- Peter Charleston, 94, Australian footballer (Hawthorn, South Melbourne).
- Arlindo Cruz, 66, Brazilian singer-songwriter and samba musician (Fundo de Quintal).
- Gérard Fayolle, 87, French politician, president of the General Council of Dordogne (1992–1994), senator (1997–1998).
- Avraham Golik, 91, Israeli marine geologist and oceanographer.
- Grass Wonder, 30, American Thoroughbred racehorse and sire, multiple organ failure.
- Stephen Haycox, 85, American historian.
- Terry Hennessey, 82, Welsh footballer (Birmingham City, Nottingham Forest, national team).
- Estanislao Esteban Karlic, 99, Argentine Roman Catholic cardinal, archbishop of Paraná (1986–2003).
- Kotofuji Takaya, 60, Japanese sumo wrestler.
- Peter Lester, 70, New Zealand sailor and broadcaster, heart attack.
- Mats Lindh, 77, Swedish ice hockey player (Winnipeg Jets, Frölunda, Mora IK).
- Christopher Loeak, 72, Marshallese politician, president (2012–2016), Iroijlaplap of Ailinglaplap Atoll (2021–2023).
- Mohammed Al Manea, 95, Kuwaiti actor.
- Eric Midwinter, 93, English author, broadcaster and academic.
- Virgil Miller Newton, 86, American priest.
- Jaume Obrador Soler, 84–85, Spanish social activist.
- Mirella Parutto, 89, Italian operatic soprano.
- Jamal Al-Qadiri Al-Boutchichi, 82–83, Moroccan murshid, leader of Budshishiyya (since 2017).
- Julián Riera, 84, Spanish footballer (RCD Espanyol, UE Sant Andreu).
- Tico Rodríguez Paz, 85, Argentine journalist.
- Sayed Sadiq, 80, Egyptian actor.
- Michal Stiborek, 57, Czech economist and manager, director of the IKEM (2019–2023).
- Félix Torres, 93, Puerto Rican baseball player (Los Angeles Angels).
- John Watson, 88, Australian politician, senator (1978–2008).
- William H. Webster, 101, American jurist and intelligence officer, director of the FBI (1978–1987) and CIA (1987–1991), chairman of the HSAC (2005–2020).
- Leo Windtner, 74, Austrian football administrator, president of the Austrian Football Association (2009–2021).

=== 9 ===
- Otto Altweck, 88, German racing cyclist.
- Ray Brooks, 86, English actor (Mr Benn, Big Deal, EastEnders), complications from dementia.
- Mark Busby, 79, American academic, novelist and writer.
- Gordon Connell, 80, Scottish rugby union player (national team).
- John Cruickshank, 105, Scottish Royal Air Force officer, Victoria Cross recipient.
- Mahmoud Farshchian, 95, Iranian painter, pneumonia.
- Sylvester Grigsby, 74, Liberian politician, acting minister of foreign affairs (2010).
- Maggie Jeffus, 90, American politician, member of the North Carolina House of Representatives (1991–1995, 1997–2013).
- Bjørn Kjellemyr, 74, Norwegian jazz bassist.
- Ivan Krasko, 94, Russian actor (The Prince and the Pauper, A Beautiful Stranger, Afghan Breakdown), People's Artist of Russia (1992), cancer.
- Bunny Larkin, 89, English footballer (Birmingham City, Norwich City, Watford).
- Stanislao Loffreda, 93, Italian friar, biblical scholar, and archaeologist.
- Carl Miller, 86, American politician, member of the Colorado House of Representatives (1996–2004).
- Mun Ki-nam, 77, North Korean-born South Korean football player (Rodongja, North Korea national team) and manager (North Korea national team).
- Audu Ogbeh, 78, Nigerian politician, minister of agriculture (2015–2019).
- Theodoros Pallas, 75, Greek footballer (Aris, Olympiacos, national team).
- Patrick Ryan, 85, American academic and Jesuit priest.
- Dame Steve Shirley, 91, German-born English computer industry executive and philanthropist (Autistica).
- Vladimir Socor, 80, Romanian political analyst.
- Gary Theroux, 73, American radio personality, author and producer.
- Barbara Underwood, 93, American politician, member of the New Hampshire House of Representatives (1970–1972, 1974–1976, 1978–1984).
- Brian Wade, 80, British convicted murderer.
- Dale Webster, 76, American surfer.
- James Woodward, 84, American physicist.
- Nobuo Yamada, 61, Japanese singer (Make-Up, Project.R), kidney cancer.
- Zhu Liang, 101, Chinese politician, head of the International Department of the CCP (1985–1993) and director of the Foreign Affairs Committee of the NPC (1993–1998).

=== 10 ===
- Amnon Barzel, 90, Israeli art critic.
- Biddy Baxter, 92, English television producer (Blue Peter).
- Debbie Blackburn, 74, American politician, member of the Oklahoma House of Representatives (1995–2007).
- John F. Brady, 66, American politician.
- Warren Brodey, 101, Canadian-born American psychiatrist.
- Yuri Butusov, 63, Russian theatre director, drowned.
- Marc-André Charguéraud, 100, French-born Swiss historian and businessman.
- Tatyana Chervenyakova, 71, Bulgarian physician.
- Davyd Chychkan, 39, Ukrainian artist and anarchist, killed in action.
- Marc Estrin, 86, American writer (Insect Dreams: The Half Life of Gregor Samsa) and political activist, heart failure.
- Graham Fenton, 78, English rockabilly singer, heart attack.
- Pat Foote, 95, American Army officer.
- Nikolai Golushko, 88, Ukrainian-Russian intelligence officer, director of the Committee for State Security (1987–1991) and director of the Federal Security Service (1993–1994).
- Thaddeus Gromada, 96, American historian.
- Egon Henninger, 85, German swimmer, Olympic silver medallist (1964, 1968).
- Richard E. Jackson, 80, American politician, mayor of Peekskill, New York (1984–1991).
- Lillie Johnson, 103, Jamaican-Canadian nurse and public health advocate.
- Kunishige Kamamoto, 81, Japanese Hall of Fame footballer (Yanmar Diesel, national team) and politician, MP (1995–2001), pneumonia.
- David Ketchum, 97, American actor (Get Smart, I'm Dickens, He's Fenster) and television writer (Happy Days).
- Michael Klick, 77, American television producer (24, Homeland, Love & Death), Emmy winner (2006, 2012).
- Narcisse Kouokam, 63, Cameroonian comedian and songwriter.
- Manuel Lourenzo, 82, Spanish theatre director.
- Paola Mauriello, 44, Italian basketball player (national team).
- Opi Bachtiar, 43, Indonesian actor and designer.
- Erich Redman, 61, Russian-born German actor (Captain America: The First Avenger, United 93, Overlord).
- Lois G. Schwoerer, 98, American historian.
- Bruce Slovin, 89, American lawyer and philanthropist.
- Leonard Tow, 97, American businessman (Frontier Communications).
- Andrey Urnov, 87, Russian diplomat, ambassador to Armenia (1994–1998).
- Bobby Whitlock, 77, American singer, songwriter ("Bell Bottom Blues") and musician (Derek and the Dominos, Delaney & Bonnie and Friends).

=== 11 ===
- Richard Carr, 87, English football executive (Arsenal).
- Yevgeny Chizhov, 58, Russian writer and journalist, drowned.
- Choo Hoey, 90, Singaporean violinist and conductor.
- Éric Colmet-Daâge, 76–77, French journalist (Photo).
- Thomas P. Costin Jr., 98, American politician, mayor of Lynn, Massachusetts (1956–1961).
- Hemanta Dutta, 83, Indian dramatist and lyricist.
- Jerzy Dziewulski, 81, Polish politician and policeman, MP (1991–2005).
- Jerome Epstein, 88, American politician and convicted felon, member of the New Jersey Senate (1972–1974).
- Carlos Ferraro, 72, Argentine journalist and politician, governor of Jujuy Province (1996–1998).
- Christian Forestier, 80, French academic and civil servant, general administrator of the Conservatoire national des arts et métiers (2008–2013).
- Mario Forte, 88, Italian politician, mayor of Naples (1984), MEP (1989–1994).
- Celso Garrido-Lecca, 99, Peruvian composer.
- Claude Gasnal, 76, French basketball player (SCM Le Mans, national team).
- Dany Gignoux, 81, Swiss photographer.
- Chuck Girard, 81, American musician (The Castells, The Hondells, Love Song), cancer.
- Dumeni Solomon Hawala, 89, Namibian military officer, chief of defence force (2000–2006).
- Heinz Jaeger, 101, German philatelist.
- Fadhel Jaziri, 77, Tunisian film director.
- Sheila Jordan, 96, American jazz singer.
- Alexander Kanevsky, 65, Russian painter.
- Benő Káposzta, 83, Hungarian footballer (Újpest, national team).
- Samuel Krislov, 95, American academic.
- Sid Ali Lazazi, 67, Algerian footballer (NA Hussein Dey, national team).
- Marie-Mad, 102, French comic books author and illustrator.
- Alfredo Messina, 89, Italian politician, senator (2008–2022).
- Nazima, 77, Indian actress (Arzoo, Be-Imaan, Honeymoon).
- Gabi Novak, 89, Croatian singer.
- Mary Karooro Okurut, 70, Ugandan politician, MP (since 2004).
- Robert Keating O'Neill, 80, American librarian.
- Danielle Spencer, 60, American actress (What's Happening!!) and veterinarian, cancer.
- Mustapha Tahiri, 72, Moroccan footballer (MC Oujda, RS Berkane, national team).
- Noel Tovey, 90, Australian dancer.
- Miguel Uribe Turbay, 39, Colombian politician, senator (since 2022), complications from gunshot wounds.
- Margaret Walton-Roberts, 57, Canadian geographer, cancer.
- Yōtsukasa Dai, 51, Japanese sumo wrestler.

=== 12 ===
- Kseniya Alexandrova, 30, Russian model, complications from a traffic collision.
- Nel Beltrán Santamaría, 83, Colombian Roman Catholic prelate, bishop of Sincelejo (1992–2014).
- Rodrigue Biron, 90, Canadian politician, Quebec MNA (1976–1985), cancer.
- Amaresh Roy Chowdhury, 96, Bangladeshi singer.
- Hefin David, 47, Welsh politician, MS (since 2016).
- Mattia Debertolis, 29, Italian orienteer.
- Alfredo Diana, 95, Italian politician, MEP (1979–1984), senator (1983–1992).
- Henri Donnadieu, 82, Mexican businessman and LGBT rights activist.
- Tiébilé Dramé, 70, Malian politician, minister of foreign affairs (1991–1992, 2019–2020).
- René Escudié, 83, French writer.
- Cool John Ferguson, 71, American blues musician.
- Rikki Fleming, 78, Scottish footballer (Ayr United, Berwick Rangers, Hibernian).
- Marcel Gagnon, 89, Canadian politician, MP (2000–2006) and Quebec MNA (1976–1985).
- Goh Cheng Liang, 98, Singaporean coatings industry executive.
- The Great Wojo, 73, American professional wrestler (WWA), heart attack.
- Barbara Harvey, 97, British medieval historian.
- Bill Hepler, 79, American baseball player (New York Mets).
- Antonio Isa Conde, 85, Dominican politician, minister of energy and mines (2015–2020).
- Aisa Kirabo Kacyira, 61, Rwandan diplomat, mayor of Kigali (2006–2011).
- Mahfuza Khanam, 79, Bangladeshi academic administrator, president of the Asiatic Society of Bangladesh (2018–2021), heart attack.
- Borys Kovtonyuk, 76, Ukrainian journalist and local historian.
- Louis Leloup, 96, Belgian stained-glass artist.
- Irene López, 80, Nicaraguan dancer, choreographer and folklorist.
- Pierre Louis-Calixte, 57, French actor (The Refuge, Bad Girl).
- Bob Maes, 100, Belgian politician, senator (1971–1985).
- David Milne, 66, Scottish rugby union player (Heriot's, Edinburgh District, national team).
- Ali al-Moselhi, 76, Egyptian politician, minister of social solidarity (2005–2011).
- Dmitri Osipov, 59, Russian fertiliser industry executive, chairman of Uralkali (2013–2020) and CEO of VSMPO-AVISMA (2021–2023).
- Aino Pervik, 93, Estonian writer.
- Sir George Reid, 86, Scottish politician, MP (1974–1979), MSP (1999–2007) and presiding officer of the Scottish Parliament (2003–2007), kidney cancer.
- Joseph Willy Romélus, 94, Haitian Roman Catholic prelate, bishop of Jérémie (1977–2009).
- Ronnie Rondell Jr., 88, American stuntman (Wish You Were Here, Speed, Lethal Weapon).
- Richard Tarrant, 83, American politician.
- David Thieme, 83, American industrial designer and motor racing sponsor (Lotus).
- Gregory H. Williams, 81, American author and academic, president of the University of Cincinnati (2009–2012) and City College of New York (2001–2009).

=== 13 ===
- Anatoly Adamishin, 90, Russian diplomat, MP (1994), ambassador to the United Kingdom (1994–1997) and Italy (1990–1992).
- Nicolas Beaucaire, 52, French actor (Serial Teachers).
- Jack Brennan, 89, English rugby league player (Blackpool Borough, Salford Red Devils, Lancashire). (death announced on this date)
- Éric Brian, 67, French historian and sociologist.
- Elspeth Cameron, 82, Canadian writer.
- Tony Clavier, 85, English archbishop.
- Stan Collard, 89, Australian politician, senator (1975–1987).
- Frank Dangeard, 67, Canadian-born French businessman, CEO of Thomson Multimedia (2004–2008).
- Kevin Dawtry, 67, English footballer (Southampton, Bournemouth, Reading).
- Norma Eagleton, 91, American politician, Oklahoma corporation commissioner (1979–1989).
- Milka Eftimova, 89, Macedonian opera singer
- Rachid Ferhani, 80, Algerian Kabyle singer.
- Emanuel Jardim Fernandes, 81, Portuguese politician, MEP (2004–2009).
- Geoff Foulds, 85, English snooker player.
- Cipriano García Fernández, 93, Spanish Roman Catholic prelate, bishop of Cafayate (1991–2007).
- William Glen, 93, American geologist.
- Mathias Grassow, 62, German ambient musician.
- Gary Hooper, 86, Australian wheelchair athlete, Paralympic champion (1964, 1968).
- Sonallah Ibrahim, 88, Egyptian novelist (Zaat, Sharaf, The Stealth), pneumonia.
- Klaus Føge Jensen, 80, Danish Olympic sailor.
- Theresa Kachindamoto, 66, Malawian politician and child marriage opponent.
- Szilárd Keresztes, 93, Hungarian Catholic hierarch, auxiliary bishop (1975–1988) and bishop (1988–2007) of Hajdúdorog.
- Marian Błażej Kruszyłowicz, 89, Polish Roman Catholic prelate, auxiliary bishop of Szczecin-Kamień (1989–2013).
- Väino Kull, 81, Estonian politician, mayor of Tartu (1993–1996).
- Li Xinliang, 88, Chinese military officer, commander of Guangxi (1983–1988), Shenyang (1995–1997), and Beijing (1997–2003) military regions.
- José Antonio Marín Rite, 84, Spanish lawyer and politician, mayor of Huelva (1979–1988) and president of the Andalusian parliament (1988–1994).
- Jacques Martial, 69, French actor (Navarro, Street of No Return) and politician, member of the Council of Paris (since 2020).
- Louis Naidorf, 96, American architect.
- Valerie Pearlman, 89, British judge.
- Derreck Robinson, 43, American football player (San Diego Chargers, Miami Dolphins, Cleveland Browns).
- Mark Rothman, 77, American television writer and producer (Laverne & Shirley, Happy Days, The Odd Couple).
- Tomo Sakurai, 53, Japanese voice actress (Rurouni Kenshin, Yu-Gi-Oh! GX, Pokémon the Series: Diamond and Pearl), cancer.
- Jatin Sarker, 88, Bangladeshi writer.
- Michael Sloan, 78, American television writer and producer (The Equalizer, B. J. and the Bear, Quincy, M.E.).
- Gerry Spence, 96, American attorney (Karen Silkwood, Imelda Marcos, Randy Weaver).
- Njattyela Sreedharan, 86, Indian lexicographer.
- Peter Stasiuk, 82, Canadian Ukrainian Catholic hierarch, bishop of Saints Peter and Paul of Melbourne (1992–2020).
- Grant Tavinor, 51–52, New Zealand academic and philosopher.
- Gayle Thompson, 86, American Olympic rower (1960).
- Kars Veling, 77, Dutch politician and philosopher, MP (2002) and member of the Senate (1991–2002).
- Art Wander, 97, American sportscaster (WWKB, WWWS, WGR).
- Klaus Wirzenius, 37, Finnish singer, drowned.

=== 14 ===
- Paulo Sérgio Almeida, 80, Brazilian film director (Xuxa e os Duendes), complications from lung cancer.
- Sharanabasappa Appaji, 89, Indian philosopher.
- Auro Enzo Basiliani, 90, Italian footballer (Spezia, Hellas Verona, Lucchese-Libertas).
- Rokeya Begum, Bangladeshi politician, MP (2005–2006).
- Noureddine Ben Omar, 74, Algerian film and television director.
- Jackie Bezos, 78, American philanthropist, co-founder of the Bezos Family Foundation.
- Teresa Caeiro, 56, Portuguese politician, member (2002–2003, 2005–2019) and vice president (2009–2019) of the Assembly of the Republic.
- Mike Castle, 86, American politician, lieutenant governor (1981–1985) and governor (1985–1992) of Delaware, member of the U.S. House of Representatives (1993–2011).
- Ingeborg Elzevier, 89, Dutch actress (Kinderen geen bezwaar, The Dress, Grimm).
- Roy Estrada, 82, American musician (The Mothers of Invention, Little Feat, The Magic Band).
- Rod Hackney, 83, British architect, president of RIBA (1987–1989), kidney failure.
- Sammy Johnston, 58, Scottish footballer (St Johnstone, Glenavon, Partick Thistle).
- Eddy Kaspard, 24, Tahitian footballer (A.S. Tefana, A.S. Vénus, national team), traffic collision.
- Gideon Kleinman, 70, Israeli footballer (Maccabi Netanya, Maccabi Hadera).
- Elie Martel, 90, Canadian politician, Ontario MLA (1967–1987).
- Mark McArdle, 68, Australian politician, Queensland MLA (2004–2020), cancer.
- Donald M. McPherson, 103, American fighter pilot.
- Melahat Okuyan, 101, Turkish physician, academic and scientist.
- Vece Paes, 80, Indian field hockey player, Olympic bronze medallist (1972), complications from Parkinson's disease.
- Nicanor Perlas, 75, Filipino environmentalist and politician.
- Charles Plosser, 76, American macroeconomist.
- Guy Rivard, 89, Canadian politician, MNAQ (1985–1994).
- Bernardo Ruiz, 100, Spanish racing cyclist, 1948 Vuelta a España winner.
- José María Saponi, 87, Spanish politician, mayor of Cáceres (1995–2007).
- Moselio Schaechter, 97, Italian-American microbiologist.
- Sen Sōshitsu XV, 102, Japanese tea master, iemoto of Urasenke (1964–2002).
- Dawie Snyman, 76, South African rugby union player (Western Province, national team) and coach (Golden Lions).
- David Stratton, 85, English-born Australian film critic (The Australian, The Movie Show).
- Mats Wahl, 80, Swedish author.

=== 15 ===
- Miriam Benyamini, 85, Israeli astrologer.
- Heiko Bleher, 80, German ichthyologist.
- Ali Boğa, 76, Turkish politician, MP (2011–2015), traffic collision.
- Anita Lyons Bond, 95, American civil rights activist.
- Brian Dobson, 91, English footballer (Colchester United).
- João Barreiras Duarte, 60, Portuguese politician, deputy (1991–1999, 2002–2005, since 2024).
- Fred Emery, 91, British television presenter and investigative journalist.
- Catherine Galliford, 58, Canadian police officer and whistleblower, liver cancer.
- La. Ganesan, 80, Indian politician, MP (2016–2018), governor of Manipur (2021–2023) and Nagaland (since 2023), complications from a fall.
- April Hickox, 70, Canadian artist and photographer.
- Bill Higginson, 88, English cricketer (Middlesex).
- Greg Iles, 65, American novelist (The Quiet Game, 24 Hours, The Footprints of God), multiple myeloma.
- Warren Jacques, 87, Australian tennis player and coach.
- Maria Krushelnytska, 90, Ukrainian pianist.
- Javier Lambán, 67, Spanish politician, president of Aragon (2015–2023) and senator (2023–2025), colon cancer.
- Sara Leighton, 91, English actress (You Know What Sailors Are, The Woman Eater, Dial 999) and portrait painter.
- Gary Little, 61, Scottish comedian, fall.
- Brian Martin, 63, American basketball player (Seattle SuperSonics, Portland Trail Blazers).
- Nina Carolina, 38, Indonesian comedian and host, breast cancer.
- Lohan Ratwatte, 57, Sri Lankan politician, MP (2010–2024).
- Philip Joe Regal, 86, American biologist.
- Tristan Rogers, 79, Australian actor (General Hospital, The Young and the Restless, The Rescuers Down Under), lung cancer.
- Jamshied Sharifi, 64, American film composer (Muppets from Space, Clockstoppers) and orchestrator (The Band's Visit), Tony winner (2018).
- Ramdas Soren, 62, Indian politician, Jharkhand MLA (2009–2014, since 2019).
- Jack Spence, 94, British academic (King's College London).
- George S. Stuart, 95–96, American sculptor and historian.
- Walter Swennen, 79, Belgian painter.
- Timothy Yu Gyoung-chon, 62, South Korean Roman Catholic prelate, auxiliary bishop of Seoul (since 2013), bile duct cancer.

=== 16 ===
- Clyde Austin, 67, American basketball player (NC State Wolfpack, Harlem Globetrotters).
- Vidadi Babanli, 98, Azerbaijani writer.
- Pippo Baudo, 89, Italian television presenter (Settevoci, Sanremo Music Festival, Domenica in).
- Graeme Campbell, 86, Australian politician, MP (1980–1998), stroke.
- Jyoti Chandekar, 68, Indian actress (Mee Sindhutai Sapkal, Dholki).
- Niels Lund Chrestensen, 85, German businessman and plant breeder.
- Fernando Cruz, 85, Portuguese footballer (Benfica, Paris Saint-Germain, national team).
- Amalia Del Ponte, 89, Italian visual artist.
- Ewald Eberle, 92, Liechtensteiner Olympic alpine skier (1956).
- Janet Grieve, 85, New Zealand biological oceanographer, president of the World Association of Copepodologists (2008–2011).
- Ted Grossman, 83, American radio host (Night Train, WLRN).
- Joachim Grubich, 90, Polish organist.
- A. James Hudspeth, 79, American academic.
- Isyaku Ibrahim, 88, Nigerian politician.
- Larry Jones, 83, American basketball player (Denver Rockets, Philadelphia 76ers, The Floridians).
- Caroline Krook, 80, Swedish Evangelical Lutheran prelate, bishop of Stockholm (1998–2009), lung cancer.
- Alberto Martín, 81, Argentine actor (Brigada en acción, Los hijos de López, My Family's Beautiful!).
- Ann McManus, 67, British television writer (Waterloo Road, Bad Girls, Take the High Road), cardiac arrest.
- Andi Meister, 86, Estonian politician.
- Cecil Moore, 95, Guyanese Olympic weightlifter (1952).
- Derry O'Sullivan, 81, Irish poet.
- Mincho Panayotov, 80, Bulgarian painter.
- Joe Reece Salter, 82, American politician, member (1986–2008) and speaker (2004–2008) of the Louisiana House of Representatives.
- Mohammed Sani Sami, 81, Nigerian politician, governor of Bauchi State (1984–1985).
- Bob Simpson, 89, Australian cricket player (New South Wales, national team) and coach (national team).
- Dan Tana, 90, Serbian-American restaurateur, actor and football administrator (Los Angeles Toros, Red Star Belgrade).
- Richard Tylinski, 87, French footballer (Saint-Étienne, national team).
- Berel Wein, 91, American rabbi and writer (Faith and Fate).
- Jules Witcover, 98, American journalist, cardiovascular disease.

=== 17 ===
- Paolo Angioni, 87, Italian equestrian, Olympic champion (1964).
- John Bartley, 78, New Zealand-born Canadian cinematographer (The X-Files, Lost, Wrong Turn).
- Agnès Berthon, 66, French actress (Knife+Heart), lung cancer.
- Marcelo Bianconi, 69, Brazilian journalist, cancer.
- Vardan Bostanjyan, 75, Armenian politician, MP (1999–2003).
- John Bowers, 97, American writer.
- Reinhard Brandt, 88, German philosopher.
- Humberto Calzada, 81, Cuban-American artist.
- Sheila R. Canby, 76, American art historian and curator, cancer.
- José Ricardo Carballo, 42, Costa Rican presenter, journalist, and writer, traffic collision.
- Joe Caroff, 103, American graphic designer.
- Sawat Chotipanich, 93, Thai judge, president of the Supreme Court (1991–1992).
- Gayle Cook, 91, American medical manufacturing executive, co-founder of the Cook Group.
- David Crawley, 88, Canadian Anglican clergyman, bishop of Kootenay (1990–2004).
- Debebe Eshetu, 83, Ethiopian actor (Shaft in Africa), journalist and human rights advocate.
- Elon Dershowitz, 64, American film producer (The Whole Truth), stroke.
- James Farris, 33, American baseball player (Arizona Wildcats), liver cancer.
- Zija Grapshi, 94, Albanian actor and puppeteer.
- Niilo Halonen, 84, Finnish ski jumper, Olympic silver medallist (1960).
- Joe Hickerson, 89, American folk singer and lyricist ("Where Have All the Flowers Gone?").
- Oldo Hlaváček, 91, Slovak actor and screenwriter.
- John Joannopoulos, 78, American physicist and academic.
- Eleni Karpeta, 88, Greek actress.
- Mark Kirton, 67, Canadian ice hockey player (Toronto Maple Leafs, Detroit Red Wings, Vancouver Canucks), complications from amyotrophic lateral sclerosis.
- Stuart Kornfeld, 89, American scientist.
- Julio César León, 100, Venezuelan Olympic track cyclist (1948).
- Víctor Maldonado Barreno, 98, Ecuadorian Roman Catholic prelate, auxiliary bishop of Guayaquil (1990–2003).
- Annie Massay, 94, Belgian trade unionist.
- Bill Mather-Brown, 89, Australian wheelchair athlete, Paralympic silver medallist (1960, 1968).
- Hans-Bert Matoul, 80, German footballer (Sachsen Leipzig, 1. FC Lokomotive Leipzig, East Germany).
- Torsten Michaelis, 64, German actor (Tatort).
- Sergio Pollastrelli, 90, Italian politician, senator (1976–1987).
- Mohamed Riad, 97, Egyptian scholar and geographer.
- Joseph C. Ritchie, 95, American politician, mayor of Newport News (1976–1986).
- Terence Stamp, 87, English actor (Billy Budd, Superman, The Adventures of Priscilla, Queen of the Desert).

=== 18 ===
- Vivian Ayers Allen, 102, American poet and playwright.
- Lloyd Ashby, 94, New Zealand rugby union player (Southland, national team).
- Joseph Trumah Bayel, 71, Ghanaian politician, MP (1993–2004).
- Eduard Carbonell i Esteller, 79, Spanish art historian, director of the Museu Nacional d'Art de Catalunya (1994–2005).
- Paul H. Cheney, 79, American academic.
- Elfi Deufl, 66, Austrian alpine skier.
- Issaâd Dhomar, 92, Algerian football player (JS El Biar, national team) and executive, president of the Algerian Football Federation (1984–1986).
- Monique Fortier, 97, Canadian film editor (The Crime of Ovide Plouffe, The Decline of the American Empire).
- Oliver Galligan, 76, Irish Gaelic football player (Cavan Gaels, Cavan) and administrator.
- Sandrino Gavriloaia, 61, Romanian journalist.
- Iman al-Ghuri, 58, Syrian actress.
- Banu Kırbağ, 74, Turkish singer, composer and arranger.
- Josef Kutheil, 86, Czech Olympic skier (1964).
- Lin Chia-cheng, 73, Taiwanese politician, minister of examination (2004–2008) and the research, development and evaluation commission (2000–2004). (death announced on this date)
- Jorge Maestro, 73, Argentine screenwriter and playwright.
- Jack McClelland, 74, American Hall of Fame poker tournament director (WSOP).
- Gilbert Mendonca, 72, Indian politician and convicted land-grabber, Maharashtra MLA (2009–2014).
- Tendai Ndoro, 40, Zimbabwean footballer (Cape Town City, Orlando Pirates, national team).
- Jean Nicolas, 96–97, French academic and historian.
- Nissar, 65, Indian film director (Sudhinam, Three Men Army, Captain).
- Walt Piatkowski, 80, American basketball player (Denver Rockets, The Floridians).
- Alvaro Piccardi, 84, Italian actor (Italian Secret Service).
- Jean Pormanove, 46, French streamer, videographer and comedian.
- Achyut Potdar, 90, Indian actor (Dabangg 2, Ferrari Ki Sawaari, 3 Idiots).
- Ralph Pratt, 85, American politician, member of the Pennsylvania House of Representatives (1975–1986).
- Guy-Patrick Sainderichin, 75, French screenwriter (Maigret, Spiral) and actor (Father of My Children).
- Shahrzad, 74, Iranian actress.
- Lindsay Sparks, 80, New Zealand cricketer (Marlborough, Central Districts, Auckland) and rugby union player.
- John Russell Taylor, 90, English critic and author.
- Abraham Than, 97, Burmese Roman Catholic prelate, auxiliary bishop (1968–1972) and bishop (1972–2001) of Kengtung.
- Marvin Tile, 92, Canadian orthopedic surgeon.
- Nicolae Todos, 89, Moldovan politician, deputy.
- Bill Williams, 91, American broadcaster (WBIR-TV).

=== 19 ===
- Alain Anen, 75, Luxembourgish Olympic fencer (1972).
- Michael Antunes, 85, American saxophonist (John Cafferty & the Beaver Brown Band, Ernie and the Automatics) and actor (Eddie and the Cruisers), kidney failure.
- Eftichios Bitsakis, 97, Greek physicist, chemist and writer.
- Anne Cartwright, 79, American politician, member of the New Hampshire House of Representatives (2010–2012).
- Sir David Davies, 89, British electric engineer and educator.
- Jonathan Farnum, 86, American politician, member of the Rhode Island Senate (1981–1987).
- Michel Fessler, 70, French film director and screenwriter (Farinelli, Ridicule, March of the Penguins).
- André Fort, 89, French Roman Catholic prelate, bishop of Perpignan-Elne (1996–2002) and Orléans (2002–2010).
- Harvey Glatt, 91, Canadian music promoter, founder of CHEZ-FM.
- Cathie Jung, 88, American Victorian dress and corset enthusiast, Guinness World Record holder for smallest waist.
- Priidik Kippar, 81, Estonian boxer.
- Martin Laamers, 58, Dutch footballer (Vitesse, Gent, national team).
- Ney López, 95, Colombian Olympic weightlifter (1956, 1960).
- Luz, 32, Japanese singer.
- Phil Meeler, 77, American baseball player (Detroit Tigers).
- Michel Odent, 95, French obstetrician, stroke.
- Razak Omotoyossi, 39, Nigerian-born Beninese footballer (Sheriff Tiraspol, Helsingborg, Benin national team).
- Eemeli Peltonen, 30, Finnish politician, MP (since 2023), suicide.
- Konstantin Polozov, 59, Russian ice hockey player.
- Michael C. J. Putnam, 91, American classicist.
- Idun Reiten, 83, Norwegian mathematician (Auslander–Reiten theory).
- Gustavo Saberbein, 80, Peruvian economist and engineer, minister of economy and finance (1987–1988).
- Erich Sailer, 99, American skiing coach, complications from a fall.
- Herwig Schopper, 101, German experimental physicist, director general of CERN (1981–1988).
- Eduardo Serra, 81, Portuguese cinematographer (The Wings of the Dove, Harry Potter and the Deathly Hallows, Girl with a Pearl Earring), BAFTA winner (1998).
- John Sherwood, 80, British hurdler, Olympic bronze medallist (1968).
- Ken Shuttleworth, 80, English cricketer (Lancashire, Leicestershire, national team).
- Lucio Tarquinio, 76, Italian politician, senator (2013–2018).
- Johan Vermeersch, 73, Belgian football player (K.V. Kortrijk, Gent) and manager (R.W.D. Molenbeek).
- Salvo Vitale, 82, Italian poet and writer.

=== 20 ===
- Everaldo Anunciação, 65, Brazilian politician, council member of Itabuna (1997–2000).
- A. K. Best, 92, American fly fisher and angling writer.
- Enrique Borgo Bustamante, 96, Salvadoran politician, vice president (1994–1999).
- Debra Boutin, 67, American mathematician.
- Dame Annette Brooke, 78, British politician, MP (2001–2015).
- Frank Caprio, 88, American judge and television personality (Parking Wars), pancreatic cancer.
- Gérard Chaliand, 91, Belgian-French historian.
- Sona Ram Choudhary, 80, Indian politician, MP (1996–2004, 2014–2019) and Rajasthan MLA (2008–2013), heart attack.
- Dinesh Chandra Dakua, 95, Indian politician, West Bengal MLA (1967–1969, 1977–2006).
- George Davida, 81, American computer scientist.
- Ian Fells, 92, British energy conversion expert.
- Levan Gachechiladze, 61, Georgian wine industry executive and politician, MP (1999–2002, 2004–2008).
- Mariana Gándara Salazar, 41, Mexican playwright and theater director.
- Tricia Gardiner, 90, British Olympic equestrian (1988).
- Ann Fagan Ginger, 100, American lawyer and political activist.
- Graham Haley, 77, Canadian author and television host.
- Brent Hinds, 51, American heavy metal musician (Mastodon, Giraffe Tongue Orchestra) and songwriter ("Colony of Birchmen"), Grammy winner (2018), traffic collision.
- Reginald Horsman, 93, English-born American historian.
- Edward Hurwitz, 94, American diplomat, ambassador to Afghanistan (1983–1986) and Kyrgyzstan (1992–1994).
- Andrew Huse, 52, American historian and writer, expert on the Cuban sandwich, suicide.
- Paul Kempeneers, 89, Belgian philologist and linguist.
- Edouard Kisonga Ndinga, 79, Congolese Roman Catholic prelate, auxiliary bishop of Kinshasa (1999–2022).
- Ichizo Konishi, 86, Japanese tennis player.
- Józef Kowalczyk, 86, Polish Roman Catholic prelate, apostolic nuncio to Poland (1989–2010), archbishop of Gniezno and primate of Poland (2010–2014).
- Erja Lahikainen, 70–71, Finnish politician, MP (1991–1995). (death announced on this date)
- Roger Laughton, 83, British television producer.
- Jacques Le Guen, 67, French politician, deputy (2002–2012).
- Marcel Łoziński, 85, Polish film director (89mm from Europe).
- Claudio Maccone, 77, Italian astronomer, heart attack.
- Karidjo Mahamadou, 71, Nigerien politician, MP (1993–1996, 2016–2020).
- Malcolm Margolin, 84, American author and publisher (Heyday Books), complications from Parkinson's disease.
- Costin Miereanu, 82, Romanian-born French composer and musicologist.
- Francesco Musotto, 78, Italian politician, MEP (1999–2008).
- Tatsuya Nagamine, 53, Japanese anime director (Dragon Ball Super, One Piece, HappinessCharge Pretty Cure!).
- Norma Nolan, 87, Argentine model and beauty pageant winner, Miss Universe (1962).
- Marian H. Rose, 104, Belgian-born American physicist and environmentalist, complications from a stroke.
- Michael Q. Schmidt, 72, American actor (Tom Goes to the Mayor, John Dies at the End, Hamlet A.D.D.).
- Herbert Schreiner, 94, Austrian Olympic sprint canoer (1952).
- Petr Sommer, 78, Czech boxer.
- Ernesto Vila, 89, Uruguayan visual artist.
- Humpy Wheeler, 86, American racing executive and actor (Cars).
- Anna Záborská, 77, Slovak politician, MP (1998–2004, since 2020) and MEP (2004–2019).
- Wayne Zahn, 84, American Hall of Fame bowler.

=== 21 ===
- Jan Erik Berntsen, 80, Norwegian actor and singer.
- Francis Bertin, 75, French historian and translator.
- Gordon Bowker, 82, American businessman, co-founder of Starbucks, bone marrow disease.
- Ricardo Bruera, 93, Argentine academic and politician, minister of education (1976–1977).
- Patricia du Roy de Blicquy, 81, Belgian Olympic alpine skier (1964).
- James Dobson, 89, American evangelist and writer (Marriage Under Fire), founder of Focus on the Family.
- Hans Feldmeier, 101, German pharmacist.
- Yoshiyuki Fukuda, 93, Japanese playwright and director.
- Kurt-Hans Goedicke, 90, German percussionist, injuries sustained in fall.
- Eugen Gomringer, 100, Bolivian-born Swiss poet.
- Karl Henke, 80, American football player (New York Jets, Boston Patriots).
- Günther Hussong, 77, German poet and comedian.
- Ago Kalde, 79, Estonian volleyball player.
- Jane Kidd, 82, English equestrian.
- Saburo Komoto, 74, Japanese politician, MP (1992–2000, 2003–2009).
- Starling Lawrence, 82, American book editor.
- Liz Liddy, 81, American information science academic.
- Keith Nelson, 86, New Zealand rugby union player (Otago, Auckland, national team).
- Yaroslav Omelyan, 96, Ukrainian artist.
- Amir Osmanović, 55, Bosnian footballer (Radnički Lukavac, Chemnitzer FC, national team).
- Swraj Paul, Baron Paul, 94, Indian-born British industrialist and politician, member of the House of Lords (since 1996).
- Rod Petrie, 69, Scottish football executive, chairman of Hibernian (2004–2019), cancer.
- Jacques Poulin, 87, Canadian novelist (Volkswagen Blues).
- Stuart Prebble, 74, British television executive, pancreatic cancer.
- Yuriy Rudnev, 70, Russian futsal coach.
- Louise Rummel, 88, New Zealand nurse and nursing educator.
- Gail Shea, 66, Canadian politician, MP (2008–2015), twice minister of fisheries, and minister of national revenue (2011–2013).
- Stanisław Sojka, 66, Polish jazz and pop musician and composer.
- Vazhoor Soman, 72, Indian politician, Kerala MLA (since 2021).
- Apostolos Vesyropoulos, 59, Greek politician, MP (since 2012), cardiac arrest.
- Viktor Vidmanov, 91, Russian politician, MP (2003–2007). (death announced on this date)
- Joe Zanussi, 76–77, Canadian ice hockey player (Winnipeg Jets, New York Rangers, St. Louis Blues).

=== 22 ===
- Tony Archer, 86, English jazz double-bassist.
- Vidal Balielo, 80, Brazilian journalist (RPC).
- Jaswinder Bhalla, 65, Indian actor (Jatt & Juliet, Carry On Jatta, Mahaul Theek Hai) and comedian, stroke.
- Denis Cameron, 86, New Zealand rugby union player (Mid Canterbury, Counties Manukau, national team).
- Javier Cid, 46, Spanish journalist (El Mundo), writer and LGBT rights activist.
- Sir Derek Cons, 97, British colonial and overseas judge, Vice-President of the Court of Appeal of the Supreme Court of Hong Kong (1986–1993).
- Artur Endreß, 93, German Olympic field hockey player (1956).
- Gene Espy, 98, American hiker.
- Edgar Feuchtwanger, 100, German-British historian.
- Ruggero Gilyarevsky, 95, Russian philologist.
- Johannes Helm, 98, German psychologist, painter and writer.
- Michael Henderson, 89, New Zealand fencer.
- Kan'ichi Kanegae, 94, Japanese politician, mayor of Shimabara (1980–1992).
- Frances A. Karnes, 87, American writer and educator.
- Mohammed Mana, 74, Nigerian military officer and politician, senator (2007–2011) and military governor of Plateau State (1993–1996).
- Raymond A. Mason, 88, American financier, founder of Legg Mason.
- Nancy Njie, 59, Gambian politician, minister of tourism and culture (2008–2010).
- Kali Prasad Pandey, 78, Indian politician, MP (1984–1989).
- Irene C. Peden, 99, American electrical engineer.
- Miguel Proença, 86, Brazilian classical pianist.
- Céline Ratsiraka, 87, Malagasy politician, first lady (1975–1993, 1997–2002).
- Suravaram Sudhakar Reddy, 83, Indian politician, MP (1998–1999, 2004–2009).
- Rolf Seelmann-Eggebert, 88, German journalist and television presenter.
- Martin Smyth, 94, Northern Irish politician, MLA (1982–1986) and MP (1982–2005).
- Marlon O. Snow, 77, American politician, member of the Utah House of Representatives (1998–2000).
- Ron Turcotte, 84, Canadian Hall of Fame jockey (Secretariat).
- Yaroslav Yevdokimov, 78, Ukrainian-born Belarusian singer.
- Iryna Zarutska, 23, Ukrainian refugee, stabbed.
- Zuristyo Firmadata, 52, Indonesian politician, MP (2019–2024).

=== 23 ===
- Jerry Adler, 96, American actor (The Sopranos, Rescue Me, The Good Wife).
- Hugo Berghuser, 91, Papua New Guinean businessman and politician.
- Reinhold Bocklet, 82, German politician, member of the Landtag of Bavaria (1994–2018) and MEP (1979–1993).
- Ioan Donca, 85, Romanian diplomat, ambassador to China (1999–2002).
- Peter Doyle, 79, Irish Olympic road racing cyclist (1968, 1972).
- Teodoro de Faria, 94, Portuguese Roman Catholic prelate, bishop of Funchal (1982–2007).
- Manuel Gausa, 66, Spanish architect.
- Mohamed Said Gees, 78, Somaliland politician, minister of foreign affairs (2002–2003).
- Gerry Harrison, 89, English football commentator.
- Giles Havergal, 87, Scottish theatre director, actor and adaptor.
- László Hetey, 83, Hungarian actor.
- Per Holst, 86, Danish film producer (I Am Dina, Max Pinlig, Simon and the Oaks).
- Yoshiharu Horii, 72, Japanese football player (Yanmar Diesel) and manager.
- Ruslan Kurmanaliev, 53, Kyrgyz actor.
- Guy H. Lillian III, 76, American lawyer.
- Forrest Lucas, 83, American oil industry executive, founder of Lucas Oil.
- Giuseppe Maggi, 95, Italian archaeologist.
- Miguel Ángel Martínez, 70, Dominican actor (La soga, Trópico de sangre).
- Patrick Edward McGovern, 80, American ancient foods expert.
- Stephen Muss, 97, American real estate developer and philanthropist, owner of Fontainebleau Miami Beach (1978–2005).
- Nandi Nyembe, 75, South African actress (Yesterday, Ses'Top La, Ashes to Ashes).
- André Oostrom, 72, Dutch footballer (FC Utrecht, Go Ahead Eagles, VVV-Venlo).
- Gerhard Palm, 78, Belgian politician, member of the Parliament of the German-speaking Community (1974–2010).
- Ausberto Rodríguez Jara, 83, Paraguayan journalist. (death announced on this date)
- Abdul Jawad Salih, 93, Palestinian politician, member of the Palestinian Legislative Council (1996–2006), mayor of Al-Bireh (1967–1973).
- Art Seitz, 82, American photographer.
- Joel Sill, 78, American music supervisor, pulmonary fibrosis.
- Dave Taylor, 61, British comic book artist (Force Works, Batman, Judge Dredd), prostate cancer.
- Maurice Tempelsman, 95, Belgian-American diamond magnate, CEO of LKI.
- Kirill Vyshinsky, 58, Ukrainian-born Russian journalist.
- Artur Zheji, 63, Albanian journalist and television host.

=== 24 ===
- Bang Yong-suk, 79, South Korean politician, minister of labour (2002–2003).
- John Barnett, 80, New Zealand film and television producer (Footrot Flats: The Dog's Tale, Whale Rider, Sione's Wedding).
- Biko Botowamungu, 68, Austrian Olympic boxer (1988).
- Stéphane Bouquet, 57, French writer (Presque rien, Wild Side, Going South).
- Michael Bustin, 88, Romanian-born American molecular biologist, senior investigator at the NCI.
- Michael Bywater, 72, British writer, columnist and cultural critic, Lewy body dementia.
- Joseph I. Castro, 58, American academic administrator, chancellor of the CSU (2021–2022) and president of the California State University, Fresno (2013–2020), cancer.
- Michael Charlton, 98, Australian-born British journalist.
- Loreto Cucchiarelli, 82, Italian rugby union player (L'Aquila Rugby, national team).
- Verónica Echegui, 42, Spanish actress (My Name Is Juani, You're Killing Me Susana, My Heart Goes Boom!), cancer.
- Mehrdad Falahatgar, 65, Iranian actor, cancer.
- Valery Fateyev, 79, Russian politician, governor of Smolensk Oblast (1991–1993), senator (1993–1995).
- Emam-Ali Habibi, 94, Iranian freestyle wrestler, Olympic champion (1956).
- Marc Hill, 73, American baseball player (St. Louis Cardinals, San Francisco Giants, Chicago White Sox).
- Richard Hobert, 73, Swedish film director (Spring of Joy, Everybody Loves Alice), screenwriter and composer.
- Margareta Ivănuș, 75, Moldovan singer.
- Jaguar, 93, Brazilian cartoonist, founder of O Pasquim.
- Dimitris Konstantaras, 78, Greek journalist and politician, MP (2004–2007).
- Luis Alberto Lamata, 65, Venezuelan film director and screenwriter (Bolívar, Man of Difficulties).
- Floyd Levine, 93, American actor (Bloodbrothers, Melrose Place, Airplane II: The Sequel).
- Khaled Louma, 70, Algerian musician and radio presenter.
- Luís Lucas, 73, Portuguese actor (A Portuguese Goodbye, Aqui na Terra, Dot.Com), heart attack.
- M. J. Mahlangu, 72, South African diplomat, ambassador to the United States (2015–2020).
- Ricardo Poma, 79, Salvadoran businessman and philanthropist.
- Yuri Presekin, 63, Russian swimmer, Olympic champion (1980).
- Pedro Rosas Bravo, 73, Venezuelan economist and politician, minister of finance (1992–1993), heart disease.
- Mariuxi Sánchez, 43, Ecuadorian politician, MP (since 2021), cancer.
- Reza Soukhtehsaraei, 75, Iranian Olympic wrestler (1976).
- Mort Todd, 63, American writer and businessman.
- Valery Uskov, 92, Russian film director (The Slowest Train, Stewardess, Eternal Call) and screenwriter.
- Theo Vonk, 77, Dutch football player (AZ Alkmaar) and manager (FC Twente, AZ Alkmaar).
- Ken Waller, 63, American politician, member of the Missouri House of Representatives (since 2023).

=== 25 ===
- Ole Aarsvold, 84, American politician, member of the North Dakota House of Representatives (1989–2008).
- Michael Aiken, 93, American sociologist and academic administrator, chancellor of the University of Illinois Urbana-Champaign (1993–2001) and provost of the University of Pennsylvania (1987–1993).
- Joy Banerjee, 62, Indian actor (Nagmoti) and politician, respiratory disease.
- Bill Christine, 87, American sportswriter.
- Robert Cook, 94, British equine veterinarian.
- Yves Cuau, 90, French writer and journalist (Le Figaro, L'Express).
- William I. Donnermeyer Sr., 100, American politician, member of the Kentucky House of Representatives (1970–1994).
- Paul Fisher, 48, English cricketer (Leicestershire Cricket Board).
- Léo Gantelet, 85, French poet.
- Tommy Hamilton, 90, Irish footballer (Shamrock Rovers, Limerick, national team).
- Ron Harbertson, 95, English footballer (Lincoln City, Darlington, Wrexham).
- Diane Hoh, 88, American author.
- Allan Hornyak, 74, American basketball player (Ohio State Buckeyes).
- Barbara Jakobson, 92, American art collector, pneumonia.
- Paul Johnson, 69, English footballer (Stoke City, Southern California Lazers, Chester). (death announced on this date)
- Paula Julander, 86, American politician, member of the Utah Senate (1999–2005).
- Igor Kalinauskas, 80, Russian artist, theatre director and singer (Duo Zikr).
- Dinesh Mangaluru, 55, Indian actor (Smile, Ambari, Savari) and art director.
- E. D. Mondainé, 65, American pastor and political activist.
- Angela Mortimer, 93, British Hall of Fame tennis player, cancer.
- James Mosley, 90, British librarian and historian.
- Jim Murray, 87, American football executive, general manager of the Philadelphia Eagles (1973–1982) and co-founder of Ronald McDonald House Charities.
- John Parkinson, 80, Australian footballer (Claremont, Collingwood).
- Isabel Pisano, 81, Uruguayan journalist (El Mundo), writer, and actress (Savage Pampas), complications from Alzheimer's disease.
- Frank Price, 95, American television producer (The Virginian) and studio executive (Columbia Pictures, Universal Television).
- Zdena Salivarová, 91, Czech-born Canadian writer, translator, and publisher (68 Publishers).
- José María Sánchez Silva, 74, Spanish military officer.
- Rainer Weiss, 92, German-American physicist (LIGO), Nobel Prize laureate (2017).
- Mike White, 86, American baseball player (Houston Colt .45s/Astros).
- Peter C. Whybrow, 86, American psychiatrist.
- Notable Palestinians killed in the Nasser Hospital strikes:
  - Ahmed Abu Aziz, 28, freelance journalist
  - Moaz Abu Taha, 26, freelance video journalist
  - Mariam Dagga, 33, journalist
  - Hussam al-Masri, 48, cameraman

=== 26 ===
- Tim Armstead, 60, American jurist and politician, justice of the Supreme Court of Appeals of West Virginia (since 2018) and speaker of the West Virginia House of Delegates (2015–2018).
- Akinwale Arobieke, 64, British convicted criminal.
- Pedro Arreitunandia, 51, Spanish road racing cyclist.
- Che Zakaria Mohd Salleh, 64, Malaysian politician.
- Mestre Damasceno, 71, Brazilian Carimbó singer and cultural director.
- Franklin Domínguez, 94, Dominican playwright, theater director, and actor (Ratman, The Lost City).
- Edward Faulkner, 93, American actor (Hellfighters, The Green Berets, Rio Lobo).
- Benjamin Feindouno, 42, Guinean footballer (AS Beauvais, Vendée Poiré-sur-Vie, La Roche VF). (body discovered on this date)
- Kathy Galloway, 72, Scottish Church of Scotland minister and leader of the Iona Community, cancer and sepsis.
- Karel Gult, 77, Czech actor.
- Salima Khudair, 78, Iraqi actress.
- Yvan Lamonde, 81, Canadian academic and historian.
- Geoff Lewis, 89, Welsh jockey.
- Pier Luigi Luisi, 87, Italian scientist.
- Sarah Minear, 84, American politician, member of the West Virginia Senate (1987–2007).
- Flip Pallot, 83, American angler.
- Mikhail Prusak, 65, Russian politician, governor of Novgorod Oblast (1991–2007).
- William Robinson, 89, Australian painter and lithographer.
- Tony Saletan, 94, American folk singer, complications from Alzheimer's disease.
- Paul Sproule, 80, Australian football player (Essendon, Richmond) and coach (Sandy Bay).
- Joe Stevens, 87, American photographer.
- David Warburton, 59, British politician, MP (2015–2023).
- Arlene Buckneberg Ydstie, 97, American composer and choral conductor.

=== 27 ===
- Damien Alary, 74, French politician, vice-president of the Regional Council of Occitania (2016–2021).
- Mathilda Bains, 67, South African politician, MP (since 2024).
- Claude Bénard, 98, French Olympic high jumper (1948, 1952).
- Shane Christie, 39, New Zealand rugby union player (Tasman, Highlanders, Māori All Blacks), suicide.
- Duke Cunningham, 83, American politician, member of the U.S. House of Representatives (1991–2005).
- Jacques Dorfmann, 79, French film producer (Patate, Juliette and Juliette, The Witness), screenwriter and film director.
- Charmaine Papertalk Green, 62–63, Australian poet and artist.
- Esther Grether, 89, Swiss art collector and businesswoman.
- Takaya Hashi, 72, Japanese voice actor (Fist of the North Star, Naruto, Moomin), heart attack.
- Steve Hayden, 78, American advertising executive, CEO and vice-chairman of Ogilvy.
- David Hays, 80, English-born Scottish cricketer (Cambridge University).
- María Izaguirre Francos, 73, Mexican politician, deputy (2003–2006, 2009–2012) and senator (2012–2018).
- Jim Kimball, 59, American drummer (Laughing Hyenas, Mule, The Jesus Lizard).
- Serhiy Kolisnyk, 60, Ukrainian artist.
- Dame Peggy Koopman-Boyden, 82, New Zealand gerontologist.
- Abdellah Liegeon, 67, Algerian footballer (Monaco, Strasbourg, national team).
- Frederica Massiah-Jackson, 74, American judge.
- Atis Monteiro, 93, Brazilian footballer (Portuguesa).
- Mitsuru Motoi, 83, Japanese tennis player.
- Cesare Nosiglia, 80, Italian Roman Catholic prelate, archbishop of Vicenza (2003–2010) and Turin (2010–2022).
- Park Sung-soo, 55, South Korean archer, Olympic champion (1988).
- Eusebio Poncela, 79, Spanish actor (Law of Desire, Arrebato, Ogro).
- Oleg Skorkin, 64, Russian footballer (SKA-Khabarovsk, FC Luch).
- Trần Duyệt, 92, Vietnamese prison warden.
- Richard Vasgaard, 75, American politician, member of the South Dakota House of Representatives (2021–2023).
- Andrée Yanacopoulo, 97, Tunisian-born Canadian doctor and sociologist.

=== 28 ===
- Thelma Admon, 75, Israeli writer.
- Lourdes Ambriz, 67, Mexican soprano, cancer.
- Jamal Amer, 57, Yemeni journalist and politician, minister of foreign affairs of the Houthi-led government (since 2024), airstrike.
- Daniel Ariciu, 74, Romanian footballer (Argeș Pitești, Baia Mare, Olt Scornicești).
- Rinchen Barsbold, 89, Mongolian paleontologist.
- Lucia de Berk, 63, Dutch paediatric nurse, subject of Accused.
- Randy Boone, 83, American actor (The Virginian, Cimarron Strip, Terminal Island).
- Gary Burbank, 84, American radio personality (WLW, Earl Pitts, Gilbert Gnarley).
- Lillian G. Burry, 89, American politician.
- Mike de Leon, 78, Filipino film director, screenwriter, and producer (Sister Stella L., Itim, Batch '81).
- David Daubney, 78, Canadian politician.
- Ex Tuuttiz, 36, Finnish rapper, music producer and DJ.
- Muhammad Abd al-Karim al-Ghamari, Yemeni military officer, chief of staff of the Yemeni Armed Forces (since 2016).
- Tibor Hajdu, 95, Hungarian historian.
- Rami Heuberger, 61, Israeli actor (Schindler's List, Dawn, Golda) and theatre director, cancer.
- Donna Hobin, 69, Canadian Olympic basketball player.
- Ollie Horgan, 57, Irish football manager (Finn Harps, Fanad United), cancer.
- Bal Karve, 95, Indian actor (Lapandav, Chatak Chandni).
- David Keighley, 77, Canadian film producer and executive (IMAX), cancer.
- Mufti Kifayatullah, 62, Pakistani Islamic scholar and politician, member of the Provincial Assembly of Khyber Pakhtunkhwa (2008–2013), complications from gunshot wounds.
- Zhanna Kolodub, 95, Ukrainian composer and teacher.
- Cal Langford, 66, Canadian Olympic bobsledder (1988, 1992).
- Joseph W. Luter III, 86, American meat processing executive, chairman of Smithfield Foods.
- Dan Margalit, 87, Israeli journalist (Haaretz) and television host.
- Randy Moffitt, 76, American baseball player (San Francisco Giants, Toronto Blue Jays, Houston Astros).
- Estela Molina, 77, Mexican professional wrestler.
- Daryl Patterson, 81, American baseball player (Detroit Tigers, Pittsburgh Pirates, St. Louis Cardinals), World Series champion (1968).
- Gary Didier Perez, 59, Haitian singer.
- Ahmed al-Rahawi, Yemeni politician, prime minister of the Houthi-led government (since 2024), airstrike.
- Walfredo de los Reyes, 92, Cuban percussionist.
- Sir Roger Sands, 83, British public servant, clerk of the House of Commons (2003–2006).
- Naun Shundi, 66, Albanian actor, skin cancer.
- Jan Szkodoń, 78, Polish Roman Catholic prelate, auxiliary bishop of Kraków (1988–2022).
- Ed Toner, 81, American football player (Boston Patriots).
- Oscar Zijlstra, 73, Dutch footballer (Cambuur).

=== 29 ===
- Arantza Arruti, 79, Spanish politician and ETA militant.
- Giulia Barone, 78, Italian historian, medievalist and paleographer.
- Charles Bierbauer, 83, American journalist (CNN).
- Helmut Böck, 94, German Olympic Nordic skier (1952, 1956).
- Arthur Brauss, 89, German actor (Cross of Iron, Hot Pavements of Cologne, The Goalkeeper's Fear of the Penalty).
- Ram Caspi, 86, Israeli attorney.
- Jayme Chemello, 93, Brazilian Roman Catholic prelate, auxiliary bishop (1969–1977) and bishop (1977–2009) of Pelotas.
- James B. Culbertson, 87, American diplomat, ambassador to the Netherlands (2008–2009).
- Robert Diouf, 83, Senegalese Olympic wrestler (1972, 1976).
- Tarek Ehlail, 43, German filmmaker, screenwriter and producer, traffic collision.
- Gabriel Feltz, 54, German conductor.
- Gary Gray, 72, American baseball player (Texas Rangers, Cleveland Indians, Seattle Mariners).
- Menachem Hacohen, 93, Israeli rabbi and politician, MK (1974–1988).
- Kim Hughes, 73, American basketball player (New York / New Jersey Nets, Denver Nuggets, Cleveland Cavaliers), ABA champion (1976).
- Inshan Ishmael, 57, Trinidadian broadcaster, founder of the Islamic Broadcast Network, cancer.
- Stephen Q. Luckett, 86, American painter.
- Yoshio Matsumoto, 87, Japanese businessman, pancreatic cancer.
- Alan Moffat, 73, Canadian football player (Hamilton Tiger-Cats).
- Uhuru Moiloa, 66, South African politician, member of the Gauteng Provincial Legislature (2014–2019). (death announced on this date)
- Francis Okobo, 88, Nigerian Roman Catholic prelate, bishop of Nsukka (1990–2013).
- Eric Ozario, 76, Indian Konkani music composer, kidney disease.
- Alberto Padilla, 60, Mexican journalist and television presenter.
- Louis M. Pate Jr., 88, American politician, member of the North Carolina House of Representatives (1995–1997, 2003–2009) and Senate (2011–2019).
- Ahmad Pejman, 90, Iranian-American composer.
- Rodion Shchedrin, 92, Russian composer (Lolita, Carmen Suite, Anna Karenina) and pianist.
- Uwe Siemon-Netto, 88, German religious editor.
- Liisa Suihkonen, 81, Finnish cross-country skier, Olympic silver medalist (1976).
- Stanislav Tarasov, 72, Russian political scientist, lung cancer.
- Steve Thompson, 70, English football player (Lincoln City, Charlton Athletic) and manager (Lincoln City), cancer.
- Klaus Thunemann, 88, German bassoonist.
- Ramón Tolosa, 65, Colombian road cyclist.
- Taimo Toomast, 63, Estonian operatic baritone.
- Álvaro Vidal Rivadeneyra, 82, Peruvian politician, minister of health (2003–2004).
- Charlie Walton, 78, American politician, member of the Kentucky House of Representatives (1993–2005).
- Philippe Waxweiler, 81, Belgian painter and sculptor.
- Irina Zorina, 87, Russian historian, writer and translator.

=== 30 ===
- Abu Obeida, 40, Palestinian militant and spokesperson (Al-Qassam Brigades), airstrike.
- Charles Arthurson, 88, Canadian Anglican clergyman, suffragan bishop of Saskatchewan (1989–2008).
- Tim Boswell, Baron Boswell of Aynho, 82, British politician, MP (1987–2010) and member of the House of Lords (2010–2025).
- Bud Brocken, 67, Dutch footballer (Willem II, national team).
- Julie Calvert, 61, Australian cricketer (Victoria, national team).
- Trax Colton, 96, American actor (It Happened in Athens, The Marriage-Go-Round).
- Neil de Beer, 56, South African politician, businessman and security consultant, colon cancer.
- Ed Donovan, 93, American actor and magazine editor.
- Ruth Elton, 91, British-Nigerian Christian missionary.
- Thomas C. Ely, 73, American Episcopal priest, bishop of Vermont (2001–2019).
- Henrique Filellini, 86, Brazilian Olympic water polo player (1968).
- Harrie Geelen, 86, Dutch illustrator, film director and animator.
- Bernard Joseph Harrington, 91, American Roman Catholic prelate, auxiliary bishop of Detroit (1993–1998) and bishop of Winona (1998–2009).
- Marion Irvine, 95, American nun and marathon runner.
- Lee Roy Jordan, 84, American football player (Alabama Crimson Tide, Dallas Cowboys).
- Mark Knoller, 73, American journalist (CBS News, Associated Press).
- Arnoldo Kraus, 73, Mexican physician and writer.
- Evgeny Levitan, 81, Russian pianist.
- Terry Ley, 78, American baseball player (New York Yankees).
- Juhani Markola, 83, Finnish singer.
- Antonio Masa Godoy, 83, Spanish politician, deputy (1977–1979).
- Andriy Parubiy, 54, Ukrainian politician, MP (since 2007), chairman of the Verkhovna Rada (2016–2019), shot.
- Nelson Price, 94, American Southern Baptist Convention pastor.
- Carol Saline, 86, American journalist (Philadelphia), acute myeloid leukemia.
- Rolf Schulmeister, 82, German educator.
- Lynn Simons, 91, American politician.
- Víctor Terradellas Maré, 62, Spanish businessman and political activist, stroke.
- Hélène Tétreault, 67, Canadian Olympic handball player (1976).
- Barrie Thomas, 88, English footballer (Scunthorpe United, Newcastle United, Mansfield Town).
- Anta Toros, 77, Turkish actress.
- Luis Fernando Verissimo, 88, Brazilian writer, pneumonia.
- Greg Whitby, 73, Australian educator.

=== 31 ===
- Sylvain Amic, 58, Senegalese-born French art historian.
- Solomon Arase, 69, Nigerian police officer, inspector general (2015–2016).
- Mike Briggs, 66, American politician, member of the California State Assembly (1998–2002), cancer.
- William Diamond, 80, American politician, secretary of state of Maine (1989–1996), member of the Maine House of Representatives (1977–1982) and three-time Maine senator.
- Bálint Dömölki, 90, Hungarian mathematician.
- Sharon Ellul-Bonici, 55, Maltese politician. (death announced on this date)
- Waldemar Espinoza Soriano, 89, Peruvian historian.
- Jeon Seong-hwan, 84–85, South Korean actor (East of Eden, Deep Rooted Tree).
- Kiril Kadiiski, 78, Bulgarian poet and essayist.
- John Macrae, 92, British diplomat, ambassador to Senegal (1985–1990) and Morocco (1990–1992).
- Priya Marathe, 38, Indian actress (Ya Sukhano Ya, Tu Tithe Me, Pavitra Rishta), cancer.
- Teresa María, 81, Spanish singer and dubbing actress, complications from Alzheimer's disease.
- Diego de Morón, 78, Spanish guitarist.
- Haim Nagid, 84, Israeli poet and writer.
- František Němec, 92, Czech cinematographer.
- Ruth Paine, 92, American teacher.
- Radna Sakhaltuev, 90, Ukrainian animator (Adventures of Captain Wrongel, Treasure Island).
- Elói Schleder, 74, Brazilian Olympic runner (1984).
- Gerald Schubert, 86, American geophysicist.
- Johnny Vilstrup, 58, Danish footballer (Lyngby, Luton Town, AGF).
- Louise Vincent, 49, American harm reduction activist.
- Evgeny Vyborov, 72, Russian bandy player.
- Chelsea Quinn Yarbro, 82, American novelist (Ariosto, Dead & Buried).
