= Jane Kidd =

Jane Kidd may refer to:

- Jane Kidd (artist) (born 1952), Canadian textile artist
- Jane Kidd (equestrian) (1943–2025), British equestrian
- Jane Kidd (politician) (born 1953), American politician
