= György Alexa =

Hungarian politician (1958–2025)

Member of the National Assembly of Hungary
- In office 16 May 2006 – 13 May 2010

Personal details
- Born: 15 June 1958; Budapest, Hungary
- Died: 3 August 2025 (aged 67)
- Political party: MSZP
- Education: Kodolányi János University
- Occupation: Communications professional

György Alexa (15 June 1958 – 3 August 2025) was a Hungarian politician. A member of the Hungarian Socialist Party, he served in the National Assembly from 2006 to 2010.

Alexa died on 3 August 2025, at the age of 67.
