= Heinz Jaeger =

German philatelist (1924–2025)

Heinz Jaeger (8 May 1924 – 11 August 2025) was a German philatelist who was added to the Roll of Distinguished Philatelists in 1987. Jaeger was an expert in the philately of Baden. Jaeger was president of the Federation of German Philatelists. He died on 11 August 2025, at the age of 101.
