= Rolf Schulmeister =

German educator (1943–2025)

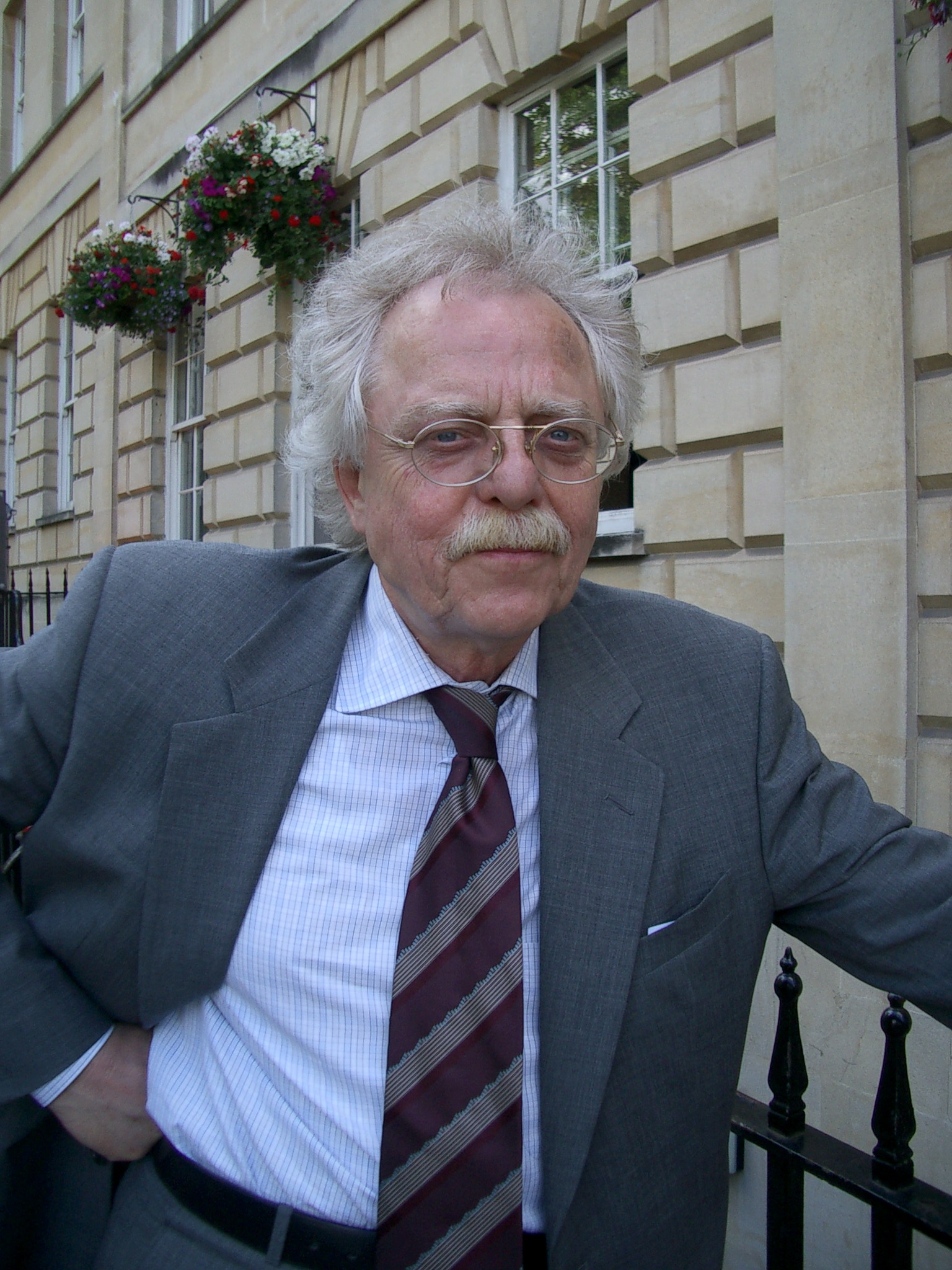
Rolf Schulmeister

Rolf Schulmeister (16 May 1943 – 30 August 2025) was a German educator and professor of education at the University of Hamburg.

== Life and career ==
Schulmeister was born in Hamburg on 16 May 1943. From 1963 to 1969 Rolf Schulmeister studied German and English philology and philosophy. In 1969, he obtained a PhD. In 1969 he headed the conference of education in Marburg, and in 1970 founded the Interdisciplinary Centre for didactic methodology of high school education (IZHD), today is known as the Learning Center of High School and Further Education. In 1976 he became a professor at the Hamburg University. Later, while Professor of didactics at the University, he initially specialized in teaching technologies (teaching and learning methods), and later on the didactics and mass media development.

In 1987, he founded the Institute of Sign Language and Communication for Deaf people in the linguistics field. After that he worked at the Language - Literature and Mass Media departments. In 1990 he attained the position of managing director at the institute once called IZHD and today the High School Learning Center and Further Education. Since 1993 he has taken part in mass media studies in the Language and Literature departments, and in 2005 became responsible for the MA degree award at the University of Hamburg.

Schulmeister was the creator of e-learning newspapers and well known due to his observations in the field of time management researches for students of BA-/BSc and MA-/MSc training programs. Over three years, he examined the learning patterns of German students as part of a one-off international study. His recently published results show that academic achievement and effort have little to do with each other. He was also the project manager of ZEITLast.

Schulmeister died on 30 August 2025, at the age of 82.

== Publications ==
- Fundamentals of the internal education system: Theory - Didactics - Project. 4. Altered and up to date edition, Oldenburg, Munich / Vienna 2007, ISBN 978-3-486-27395-3
- E-learning: acquaintance and prospects. Oldenburg, Munich / Vienna 2006, ISBN 978-3-486-58003-7
- Guidance on orientation units: Fundamentals, Didactics. – Planning methodology and organization of training activities. In cooperation with Ilse Goldschmidt, Beltz, Weinheim / Basel 1982, ISBN 3-407-54129-5
