= Stanislav Filipenko =

Ukrainian circus performer (1938–2025)

Stanislav Bakhstasovych Filipenko (Ukrainian: Станіслав Бахстасович Філіпенко; 8 July 1938 – 6 August 2025) was a Ukrainian circus artist.

== Life and career ==
Filipenko was born on 8 July 1938, and began his career in the circus after graduating from school. He worked with the State Circus for 26 years. In 1983, he joined the folk circus "Youth of Kyiv", where he worked as a tutor. In later life, he taught at the Kyiv Municipal Academy of Variety and Circus Arts, while simultaneously directing the "Youth of Kyiv".

Filipenko died on 6 August 2025, at the age of 87.
