= Kiril Kavadarkov =

Bulgarian actor (1943–2025)

Kiril Stoyanov Kavadarkov (Bulgarian: Кирил Стоянов Кавадарков; 7 August 1943 – 3 August 2025) was a Bulgarian actor.

== Life and career ==
From 1967 he worked at the Yordan Yovkov Drama Theater in Tolbuhin, the Varna Municipal Theater in Varna, the Drama Theater "N. O. Masalitinov" in Plovdiv and the Drama and Puppet Theater "Konstantin Velichkov" in Pazardzhik. From 1976 he was a member of the troupe of the National Theater.

He won the Askeer Award for Supporting Actor for "The Price" in 1993.

Kavadarkov died on 3 August 2025, four days before his 82nd birthday.
