= Warren Brodey =

Canadian-born American psychiatrist (1924–2025)

Warren Brodey (January 25, 1924 – August 10, 2025) was a Canadian-born American psychiatrist, systems theorist and cybernetician. He died at home on August 10, 2025, at the age of 101.
