= Glòria Rognoni =

Spanish actress, playwright and teacher (1944–2025)

Glòria Rognoni Planas (27 March 1944 – 1 August 2025) was a Spanish actress, playwright, teacher and theater director.

== Early life and career ==
Rognoni was born in Barcelona on 27 March 1944. She was a member of the independent theatre company Els Joglars from its founding.

In 1997 Rognoni founded the Femarec Theatre Company, a social theatre group made up of people with mental disabilities.

== Personal life and death ==
In 1975, during a television recording, Rognoni suffered a fall from a platform while rehearsing in the show Àlias Serrallonga. The accident caused a spinal injury leaving her paraplegic in the legs, needing a wheelchair for her movements.

Rognoni died in San Cugat del Vallés on 1 August 2025, at the age of 81.
