= Alain de Dieuleveult =

French historian and author (1926–2025)

- Born: 11 April 1926; Rennes, France
- Died: 6 August 2025 (aged 99)
- Occupations: Author; Historian

Alain de Dieuleveult (French: [alɛ̃ də djøləvø]; 11 April 1926 – 6 August 2025) was a French author and historian.

De Dieuleveult was a member of the noble de Dieuleveult family. He was a schoolteacher at the Lycée français Chateaubriand and the Prytanée national militaire and was co-director of the "Le siècle des petits trains" collection at Éditions Cénomane.

De Dieuleveult died on 6 August 2025, at the age of 99.

== Publications ==
=== Railways ===
- Le siècle des petits trains ou l'histoire exemplaire du réseau départemental de la Sarthe (1985)
- Petits trains d'Ille-et-Vilaine (1986)
- Quand les petits trains faisaient la Manche (1988)
- Petits trains de Touraine (1988)
- Calvados pour les petits trains (1997)
- Finistère en petits trains (1998)
- Chers petits trains du Loir-et-Cher (2001)
- Petits trains départementaux : comment aborder leur histoire (2002)

=== History of La Flèche ===
- La guillotine de La Flèche (1981)
- Histoire de la Providence (1991)
- Comment vivaient les Fléchois aux XVIIe et XVIIIe siècles (2009)
- Louis-François de Bigault d'Harcourt (1768–1832) (2010)

=== Other publications ===
- Le Saint-Cœur de Vendôme. Recrutement d'une communauté religieuse du XIXe siècle à nos jours (1993)
