= Narcisse Kouokam =

Cameroonian comedian and songwriter (1962–2025)

- Born: 29 March 1962; Bafoussam, Cameroon
- Died: 10 August 2025 (aged 63); Yaoundé, Cameroon
- Occupation(s): Comedian; Songwriter

Narcisse Kouokam (29 March 1962 – 10 August 2025) was a Cameroonian comedian and songwriter.

== Life and career ==
Born in Bafoussam on 29 March 1962, Kouokam began his comedy career while attending school in Yaoundé. He was influenced to begin comedy by Ambroise Mbia, Cameroonian actor and founder of the Rencontres Théâtrales Internationales du Cameroun. In the 1980s, he appeared on the Cameroon Radio Television show Roue libre. He also appeared on the TV show Tam-Tam week-end alongside singer François Misse Ngoh. Nicknamed the "Ayatollah of Humour", he took on the stage name Nar6 and produced a variety of sketches on the wrongdoings and shortcomings of society. His other collaborations included the likes of Jean Miché Kankan, Essindi Mindja, and Dave K. Moktoï.

In 2019, Kouokam celebrated 35 years of his career in Yaoundé. He performed in a stage production titled Le Mariage de Miche under the direction of his friend Jacobin Yarro. In 2022, he performed at the Institut français du Cameroun and recounted his 60 ans de conneries (60 years of bullshit). He also cited a United States Department of State report from 2002 about an attack he had faced after criticizing abuses of the Cameroonian government.

Kouokam died in Yaoundé on 10 August 2025, at the age of 63.

== Publications ==
- J'apprends vite à rire, mon livre unique de comique (2022)

== Other works ==
- Appelez-moi honorable (Sketch, 1990)
- Téléphone circulaire (Sketch, 2000s)
- La coupe Karl Marx ; Le Discours dort (Compilation of sketches)
- Le match de l’année (EP, 2019)
