= Flip Pallot =

American angler (1942–2025)

Phillip Roger Pallot (June 6, 1942 – August 26, 2025) was an American angler. He was the host of the ESPN program The Walker's Cay Chronicles from 1992 to 2007.

== Biography ==
Pallot was born in South Florida on June 6, 1942. Originally a banker, he left his career in order to become a television host and professional guide for fishing. In addition, he was a conservationist. Magazine Garden and Gun referred to him as "the most famous angler in the history of saltwater fly fishing", while the American Museum of Fly Fishing called him "one of fly fishing's true greats". He hosted The Walker's Cay Chronicles on ESPN from 1992 to 2006. Pallot died in Thomasville, Georgia on August 26, 2025, at the age of 83.
