= François Gouges =

French pétanque player (1941–2025)

Personal information
- Nationality: French
- Born: 3 September 1941 Argelès-sur-Mer, France
- Died: 3 August 2025 (aged 83)

Sport
- Country: France
- Sport: Pétanque
- Position: Shooter
- Shoots: Right
Medal record
Pétanque
Representing France
Pétanque World Championships
Silver medal – second place	1977 Luxembourg	Men's triples

François Gouges (French: [fʁɑ̃swa guʒ]; 3 September 1941 – 3 August 2025) was a French pétanque player who played as a shooter. He won a silver medal at the 1977 Pétanque World Championships in men's triples and twice won a gold medal at the French Pétanque Championships in head-to-head.

Gouges died on 3 August 2025, at the age of 83.
