= Bálint Dömölki =

Hungarian mathematician (1935–2025)

- Born: 11 July 1935; Budapest, Hungary
- Died: 31 August 2025 (aged 90)
- Education: Eötvös Loránd University
- Occupation: Mathematician

Bálint Dömölki (11 July 1935 – 31 August 2025) was a Hungarian mathematician. A member of the Hungarian Academy of Sciences, he was a recipient of the John von Neumann Award for the Information Society (2003).

Dömölki died on 31 August 2025, at the age of 90.
