= Erja Lahikainen =

Finnish politician (1954–2025)

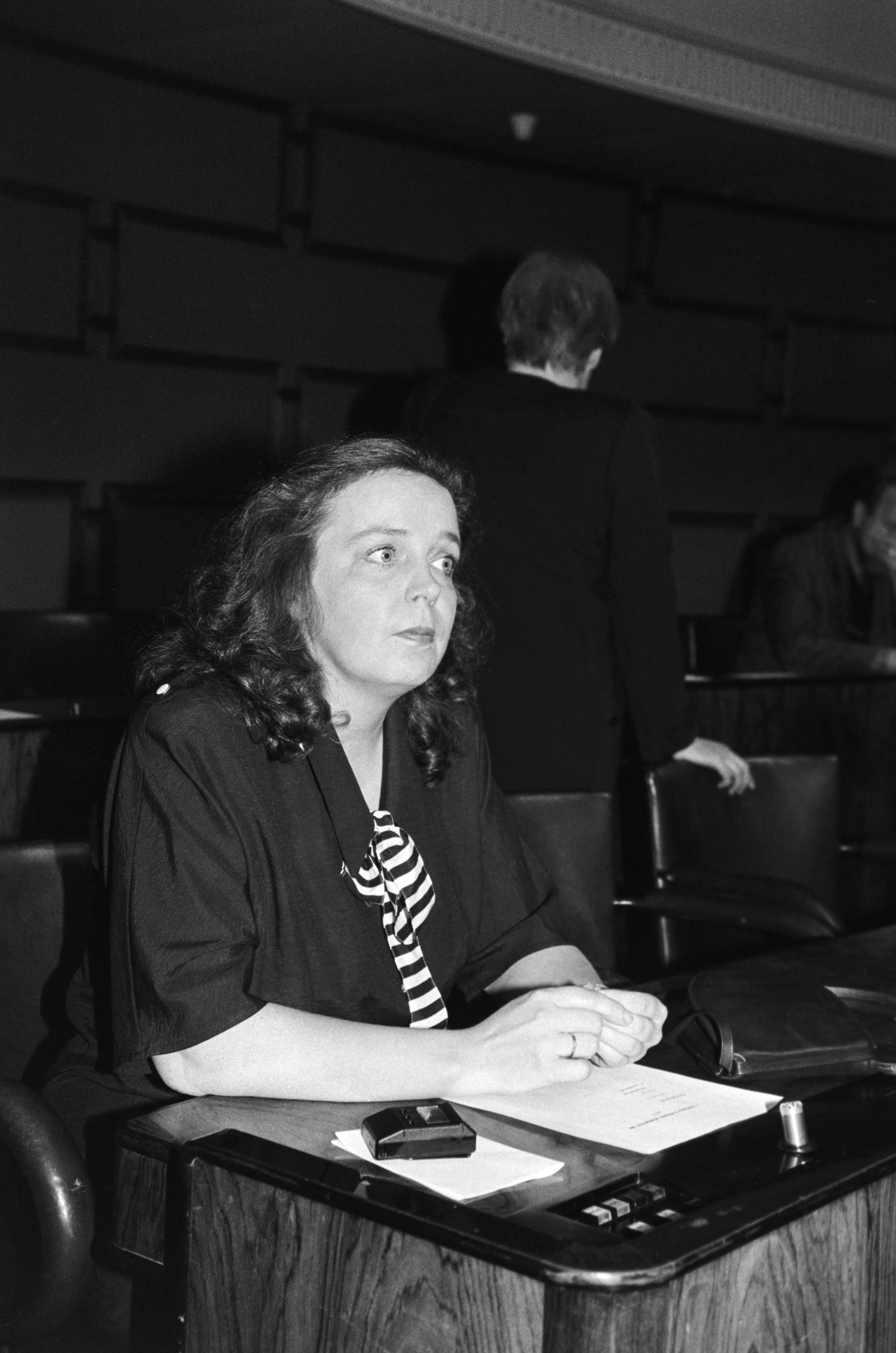
Lahikainen in 1991

Erja Helena Lahikainen (21 February 1954 in Heinola – 2025) was a Finnish politician. She was a Member of the Parliament of Finland from 1991 to 1995, representing the Social Democratic Party of Finland (SDP).
