= Everaldo Anunciação =

Brazilian politician (1960–2025)

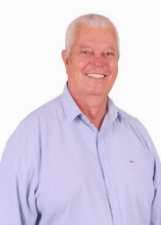
- Anunciação in 2020

Council member of Itabuna
- In office 1997–2000

Vice President of the Workers' Party

Personal details
- Born: May 1, 1960 Ilhéus, Brazil
- Died: August 20, 2025 Santa Izabel Hospital, Salvador, Brazil
- Occupation: Politician

Everaldo Anunciação (May 1, 1960 – August 20, 2025) was a Brazilian politician.

== Life and career ==
Anunciação was born in Ilhéus in 1960. He was a council member of Itabuna (1997–2000). He was the vice president of the Workers' Party.

Anunciação died at the Santa Izabel Hospital in Salvador, on August 20, 2025, at the age of 65.
