= Philip Joe Regal =

American biologist

Philip Joe Regal (December 2, 1939 – August 15, 2025) was an American professor emeritus in the Department of Ecology, Evolution, and Behavior at the University of Minnesota. Prior to working there, he worked at the University of California. He named the salamander species Pseudoeurycea juarezi.

Regal is the author of a book on philosophy, The Anatomy of Judgement, published by University of Minnesota Press in 1990.

He was a prominent advocate for the increased regulation of GMO products, appearing in a major lawsuit and working with the Center for Food Safety.

Regal died on August 15, 2025, at the age of 86.
