= Jean Nicolas (historian) =

French academic and historian (1928–2025)

- Born: 1928; Silhac, France
- Died: 18 August 2025 (aged 96–97)
- Education: Agrégation d'histoire
- Occupation(s): Academic; Historian

Jean Nicolas (1928 – 18 August 2025) was a French academic and historian.

== Life and career ==
Nicolas taught at the University of Montpellier Paul Valéry and Paris Diderot University before his 1981 election to the Académie des sciences, belles-lettres et arts de Savoie. He was also a member of the Comité de vigilance face aux usages publics de l'histoire.

Nicolas died on 18 August 2025.

== Publications ==
- La Savoie au XVIIIe siècle, Noblesse et Bourgeoisie (1978)
- La vie quotidienne en Savoie aux XVIIe et XVIIIe siècles (1979)
- La Révolution française dans les Alpes. Dauphiné et Savoie (1989)
- La Rébellion française, mouvements populaires et conscience sociale (1661-1789) (2002)
- La Savoie d’André Kertèsz (2004)
- La vie quotidienne en Savoie aux XVIe et XVIIIe siècles (2005)
