= Wolfgang Buresch =

German puppeteer (1941–2025)

Wolfgang Buresch (4 February 1941 – 4 August 2025) was a German puppeteer, television writer and film director.

== Background ==
Buresch was born in Kiel on 4 February 1941. From 1959 to 1963, he trained as a puppeteer with the Hohnsteiner Puppentheater under Friedrich Arndt in Hamburg. In 1973, he enrolled at the University of Hamburg for studies in pedagogy, psychology and theatre studies while also completing a professional course in film editing and post-production.

Buresch died on 4 August 2025, at the age of 84.

== Career ==
=== Early television and Stoffel und Wolfgang ===
Buresch first appeared on West German television in 1965, hired simultaneously by NDR and WDR as a freelance author-performer. His breakthrough came with the educational sketch series Der Puppenspieler kommt and the hybrid live-action/puppet format Stoffel und Wolfgang, in which he played the adult foil to the inquisitive hand-puppet Stoffel. The programmes were later described by Buresch himself as “secret toddler television”, airing years before broadcasters officially acknowledged an audience under six.

=== Creation of Hase Cäsar and other puppet icons ===
In the same year, the floppy-eared rabbit Hase Cäsar made his screen debut, voiced and animated by Buresch. After a six-episode trial run in 1966 the character received a standalone series, spawning spin-off musical segments such as Schlager für Schlappohren (1967) and the satirical talk slot Dr. h.c. Cäsar (1971). Environmental special Zwei alte Hasen entdecken Neues (1982) illustrated Buresch’s talent for embedding social issues in children's entertainment. The character returned for Christmas-eve specials in 2001 and 2004, again with Buresch at the controls. He was also an in-demand audio dramatist, lending his voice to series such as Tim und Struppi, Lucky Luke, Die Schlümpfe and Scotland Yard while scripting or producing more than one hundred children's records.
