= Ramón Bayés =

Spanish psychologist (1930–2025)

Ramón Bayés Sopena (Spanish: [raˈmom baˈʝes soˈpena]; 29 September 1930 – 7 August 2025) was a Spanish psychologist.

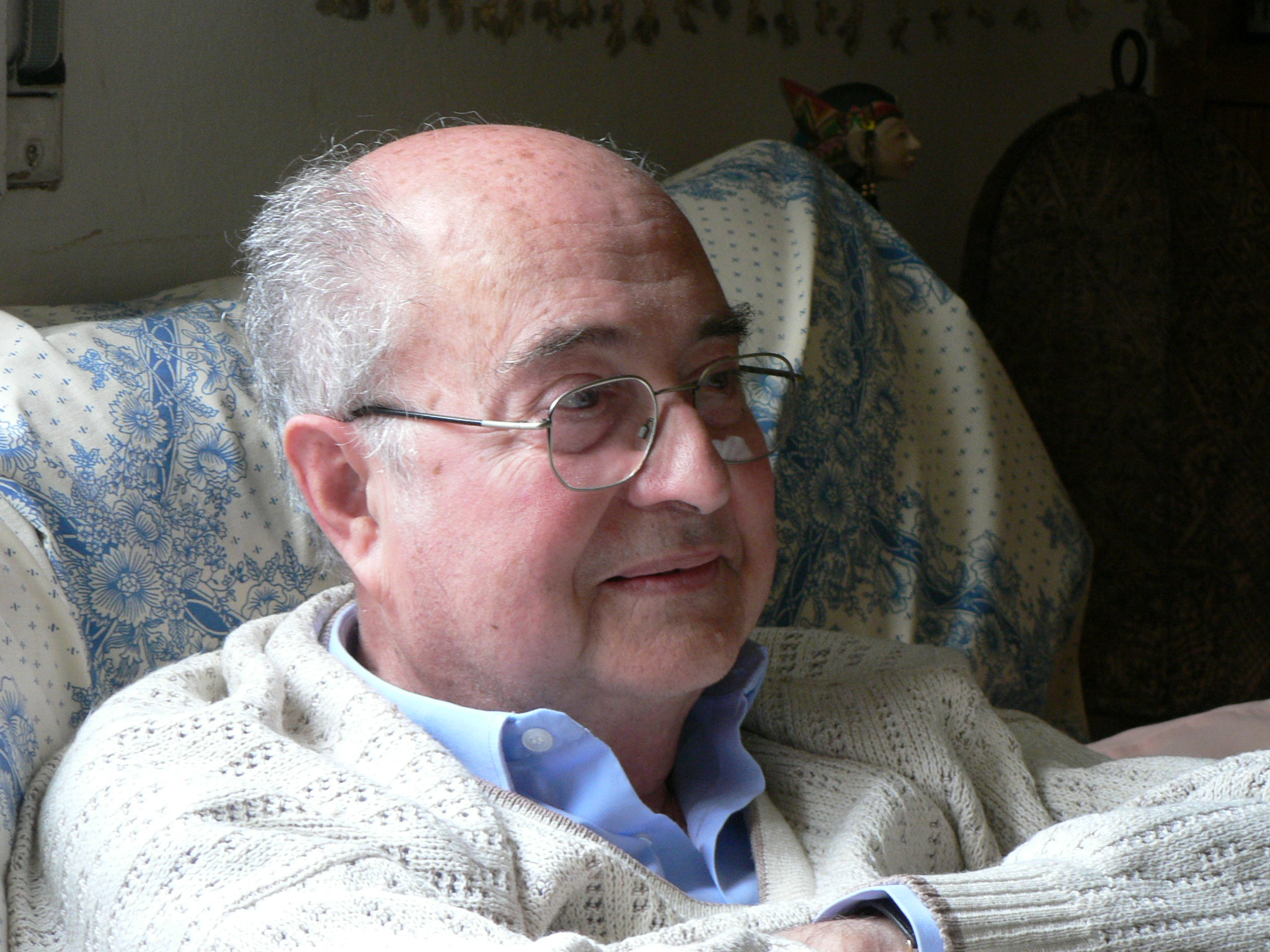
Bayés in 2006

== Life and career ==
Bayés was born in Barcelona on 29 September 1930. He studied psychology at the University of Barcelona where he obtained his doctorate in 1976 with the thesis "Contribution of the experimental analysis of behavior to the research of psychotropic drugs". He was a professor at the Autonomous University of Barcelona from 1983, and appointed professor emeritus after his retirement in 2002.

In 1995, Bayés was awarded the Pavlov prize, and the Honorary Member of the Official Colleges of Psychologists of Catalonia in 2008.

Bayés died on 7 August 2025, at the age of 94.
