= Eftichios Bitsakis =

Greek doctor and philosopher (1927–2025)

- Ευτύχης Μπιτσάκης
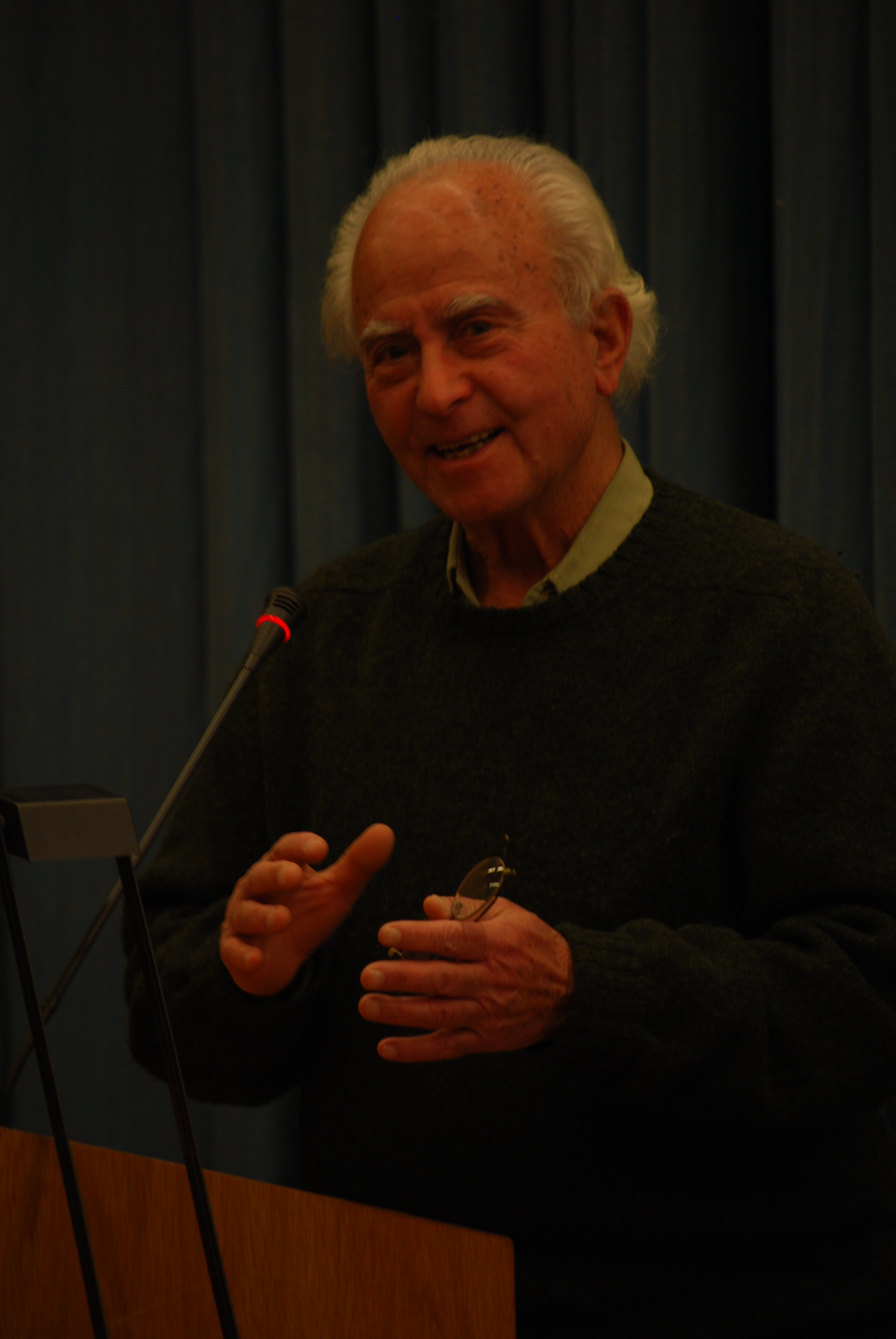
- Bitsakis in 2009
- Born: 24 August 1927; Kantanos-Selino, Greece
- Died: 19 August 2025 (aged 97); Athens, Greece
- Education: National and Kapodistrian University of Athens (BS); University of Paris (PhD); Paris 8 University (DÉ)
- Occupation: Philosopher
- Employer(s): Collège de France; University of Athens; University of Ioannina

Eftichios Bitsakis (Greek: Ευτύχης Μπιτσάκης; 24 August 1927 – 19 August 2025) was a Greek philosopher.

A longtime professor at the University of Ioannina, he was a member of the United Panhellenic Organization of Youth during the Greek Resistance. He earned a Doctor of Philosophy from the University of Paris and a Docteur d'État from Paris 8 University in 1976. He also notably taught at the Collège de France.

Bitsakis died in Athens on 19 August 2025, at the age of 97.

== Publications ==
=== In French and English ===
- Physique contemporaine et matérialisme dialectique (1973)
- Le problème du déterminisme en physique [Thèse d'État], (1976)
- Le concept de système quantique - Définition, séparabilité, transformation (1978)
- La philosophie de la nature d'Aristote (1979)
- Physique et matérialisme (1983)
- Determinism in Physics (1985)
- The Concept of Probability (1989)
- Le nouveau réalisme scientifique: recherches philosophiques en microphysique (2000)
- Paul Langevin: du réalisme scientifique au matérialisme (2002)
- La nature dans la pensée dialectique (2003)
- Microphysique: pour un monisme de la matière (2004)

=== In Italian ===
- La Natura nel pensiero dialettico (2009)
- La Materia e lo Spirito (2014)

=== In Greek ===
- Φυσική και φιλοσοφία (1965)
- Διαλεκτική και νεότερη φυσική (1974)
- Η φύση στη διαλεκτική φιλοσοφία (1974)
- Το είναι και το γίγνεσθαι (1975)
- Η εξέλιξη των ιδεών στη φυσική (επιμ., 1978)
- Τα εννοιολογικά θεμέλια της κβαντικής μηχανικής (1979)
- Θεωρία και πράξη (1980)
- Διαλεκτική: προβλήματα και διερευνήσεις (επιμ., 1983)
- Καρλ Μαρξ: o θεωρητικός του προλεταριάτου (1983)
- Τι είναι φιλοσοφία (1984)
- Το σχολείο των παπαγάλων (1984)
- Ιδεολογικά 1 (1986)
- Ρήξη ή Ενσωμάτωση; (1989)
- Φιλοσοφία του ανθρώπου (1991)
- Ένα φάντασμα πλανιέται (1992)
- Το αειθαλές δέντρο της γνώσεως (1995)
- Βιογραφικά-Δημοσιεύματα (1996)
- Ο νέος επιστημονικός ρεαλισμός (1999)
- Ο δαίμων του Αϊνστάιν (2000)
- Γονίδια του μέλλοντος (2001)
- Δρόμοι της διαλεκτικής (2003)
- Δυναμική του ελαχίστου (2003)
- Οι πόλεμοι της νέας τάξης (2005)
- Από την πυρά στον άμβωνα (2009)
- Η ύλη και το πνεύμα (2011)
- Ανθρώπινη φύση: για έναν κομμουνισμό του πεπερασμένου (2013)
- Χώρος και χρόνος (2014)
- Οι θύελλες της προόδου (2017)
- Οκτωβριανή Επανάσταση 1917-2017 (συμμετοχή, 2017)
- Για μια εγκόσμια ηθική (2025)
