= René Escudié =

French writer (1941–2025)

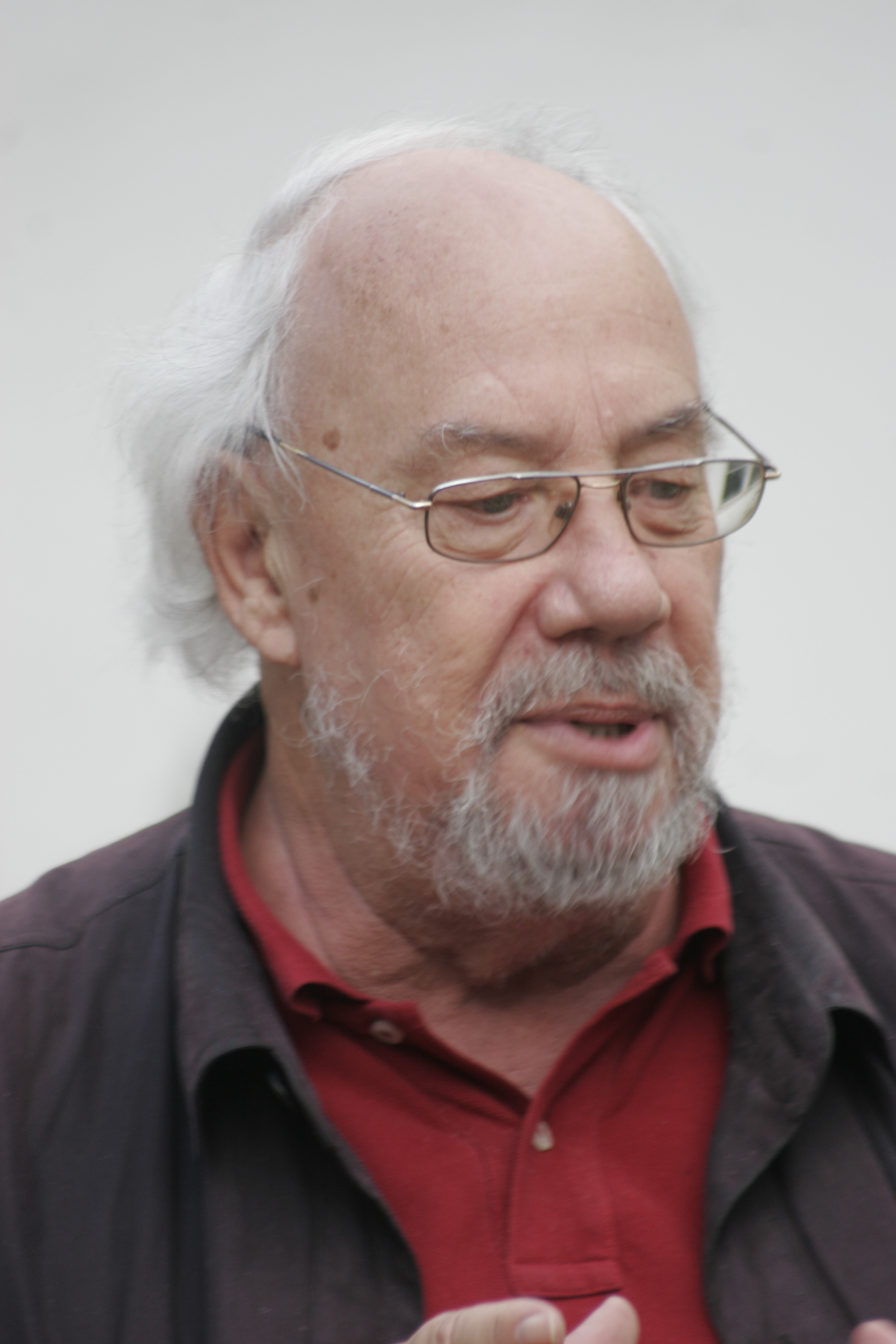
- Escudié in 2008
- Born: 24 October 1941; Clermont-Ferrand, France
- Died: 12 August 2025 (aged 83); Aimargues, France
- Occupation: Writer

René Escudié (24 October 1941 – 12 August 2025) was a French writer.

His extensive list of works can be found at the Departmental Archives of Hérault. His publications included novels, theatrical pieces, television scripts, art critiques, and political works.

Escudié died in Aimargues on 12 August 2025, at the age of 83.
