= Tanel Kerikmäe =

Estonian lawyer (1969–2025)

Tanel Kerikmäe (15 August 1969 – 1 August 2025) was an Estonian lawyer and legal scholar.

== Life and career ==
Kerikmäe was born in Tartu, Soviet Union on 15 August 1969. He studied law at the University of Tartu, graduating in 1992, before receiving a degree in law from the University of Helsinki in 1997.

From 2009, he worked at the School of Law of Tallinn University of Technology: as a researcher in 2009–2010 and as a professor from 2010 to 2020. From 2017, he was the Director of the Department of Law at TalTech and from 2020, Professor of European Legal Policy and Technology Law.

Kerikmäe died on 1 August 2025, at the age of 55.
