= Jean-Pierre Allali =

Tunisian-born French academic, writer and journalist (1939–2025)

- Born: 9 December 1939; Tunis, French protectorate in Tunisia
- Died: 2 August 2025 (aged 85)
- Occupations: Academic; Writer; Journalist

Jean-Pierre Allali (French: [ʒɑ̃pjɛʁ alali]; 9 December 1939 – 2 August 2025) was a Tunisian-born French academic, writer and journalist. He primarily dedicated his work to fighting anti-Semitism and wrote for Al Jazeera from 2010 to 2018.

Allali died on 2 August 2025, at the age of 85.

== Biography ==
Jean-Pierre Allali began his career as a mathematics professor at the University of Paris I, then became a journalist. As editor-in-chief of La Terre Retrouvée and later of Tribune Juive, and as the author or co-author of some thirty books devoted primarily to Jewish history, prominent figures in Judaism, and the fight against racism and antisemitism, he is particularly recognized as an expert on the history of the Jews of Tunisia. A prominent figure in the Jewish community, he holds positions within several organizations, including membership on the executive board and the general assembly of the CRIF.

== Publications ==
- Crif - Étude du Crif no 60 : Les Juifs de Tunisie. Deux mille ans d’une belle histoire
