= Francis Bertin =

French historian and translator (1949–2025)

- Born: 14 December 1949
- Died: 21 August 2025 (aged 75)
- Education: Institut libre d'étude des relations internationales
- Occupation(s): Historian; Translator

Francis Bertin (14 December 1949 – 21 August 2025) was a French historian and translator.

He was most known for his L'Europe de Hitler series, published by La Librairie française. He also translated the works of the likes of John Scotus Eriugena and Nicholas of Cusa.

Bertin died on 21 August 2025, at the age of 75.

== Publications ==
- L'Europe de Hitler 1, Les Décombres des démocraties (1976)
- L'Europe de Hitler 2, La Marche vers l'Est (1977)
- L'Europe de Hitler 3, Les Alliés du Reich (1977)
