= Sayed Sadiq =

Egyptian actor (1945–2025)

- Born: 18 June 1945; Abdin
- Citizenship: Kingdom of Egypt, Republic of Egypt, United Arab Republic, Egypt
- Occupation: Actor

Sayed Sadiq (Arabic: سيد صادق; 18 June 1945 – 8 August 2025) was an Egyptian actor.

== Life and career ==
Throughout his career he portrayed numerous roles in television series including Naji Atallah Band (2012) Legacy of the Wind (2013), and Al-Araf (2013).

Sadiq died on the morning of 8 August 2025, at the age of 80. The funeral prayer was held after Friday prayers at the Police Mosque in Sheikh Zayed, and the burial was held at the family cemetery on Fayoum Road.
