= Eleni Karpeta =

Greek actress (1937–2025)

- Ελένη Καρπέτα
- Born: 1937; Chiliadou, Phthiotis, Greece
- Died: 17 August 2025 (aged 88)

Eleni Karpeta (Greek: Ελένη Καρπέτα; 1937 – 17 August 2025) was a Greek actress.

== Life and work ==
Karpeta was born in Chiliadou, Phthiotis in 1937. Throughout her career, she appeared in a number of feature films, including Psila ta heria Hitler (1962), Electra (1962), Difficult Roads (1965) and prin fygeis gia panta (1969).

Karpeta died on 17 August 2025, at the age of 88.
