= Sylvain Hanquez =

French footballer (1958–2025)

Personal information
- Date of birth: 16 January 1958
- Place of birth: Rue, France
- Date of death: 3 August 2025 (aged 67)
- Height: 1.68 m (5 ft 6 in)
- Position: Midfielder

Senior career*
Years	Team	Apps	(Gls)
?–1979	US Quend	?	(?)
1979–1994	Abbeville	161	(15)
- * Club domestic league appearances and goals

Sylvain Hanquez (16 January 1958 – 3 August 2025) was a French footballer who played as a midfielder. He played for SC Abbeville from 1979 to 1994, appearing in 161 matches and scoring 15 goals.

Hanquez died on 3 August 2025, at the age of 67.
