= Oleg Skorkin =

Russian footballer (1961–2025)

Personal information
- Full name: Oleg Fyodorovich Skorkin
- Date of birth: 29 March 1961
- Place of birth: Khabarovsk, Russian SFSR, USSR
- Date of death: 27 August 2025 (aged 64)
- Place of death: Khabarovsk, Russian SFSR, USSR
- Height: 1.79 m (5 ft 10 in)
- Positions: Forward; midfielder

Youth career
- Zarya Khabarovsk

Senior career*
Years	Team	Apps	(Gls)
1978–1992	SKA-Khabarovsk	403	(53)
1993–1994	Luch Vladivostok	62	(4)
1995	SKA-Khabarovsk	16	(1)
- * Club domestic league appearances and goals

Oleg Fyodorovich Skorkin (Russian: Олег Фёдорович Скоркин; 29 March 1961 – 27 August 2025) was a Russian footballer who played as a forward or midfielder.

== Career ==
Skorkin began playing professional football with local side SKA-Khabarovsk at age 18. Skorkin played for SKA Khabarovsk in the Soviet First League and Soviet Second League scoring more than 50 league goals. In 1993, he had a brief spell at Luch Vladivostok in the Russian Top League.

== Death ==
Sorkin died on 27 August 2025, at the age of 64.
