= Niels Lund Chrestensen =

German businessman and plant breeder (1940–2025)

- Born: 9 August 1940; Erfurt, Thuringia, Nazi Germany
- Died: 16 August 2025 (aged 85); Erfurt, Thuringia, Germany
- Education: Humboldt University of Berlin
- Occupations: Businessman, plant breeder

Niels Lund Chrestensen (9 August 1940 – 16 August 2025) was a German businessman and plant breeder. He was a recipient of the Order of Merit of the Federal Republic of Germany (1999).

Chrestensen died on 16 August 2025, in Erfurt, Thuringia, at the age of 85.

== Early life and education ==
Chrestensen trained in his family's horticultural business from 1954 to 1967, and attended Leicester College for Technology and Commerce in England, earning his Abitur. He went on to study at the Humboldt University of Berlin, graduating as a certified horticulturist (Diplomgärtner).

== Career ==
From 1967 to 1972, Chrestensen served as production manager of his family's horticultural business in Erfurt. The firm was subsequently nationalized, and from 1972 to 1990 he worked as production manager of the East German state enterprise VEB Erfurter Blumensamen.Following German reunification, from 1990 to 2010 he served as co-managing director of the reconstituted Erfurt seed and plant-breeding company N. L. Chrestensen.

From 1990 to 2010, Chrestensen also served as president of the Thuringian Chamber of Industry and Commerce (Industrie- und Handelskammer Thüringen). In that role, he was a co-founder of the Erfurt chamber of commerce after reunification and advocated for Erfurt's inclusion as a stop on Germany's Intercity-Express (ICE) high-speed rail network.

== Honours ==
In addition to the Order of Merit of the Federal Republic of Germany (Bundesverdienstkreuz am Bande), which he received in 1999, Chrestensen was awarded the Order of Merit of the Free State of Thuringia (Verdienstorden des Freistaats Thüringen) in 2005, and received the First Class of the Order of Merit of the Federal Republic of Germany (Bundesverdienstkreuz Erster Klasse) in 2010..
