= Vardan Bostanjyan =

Armenian politician (1949–2025)

- Վարդան Բոստանջյան
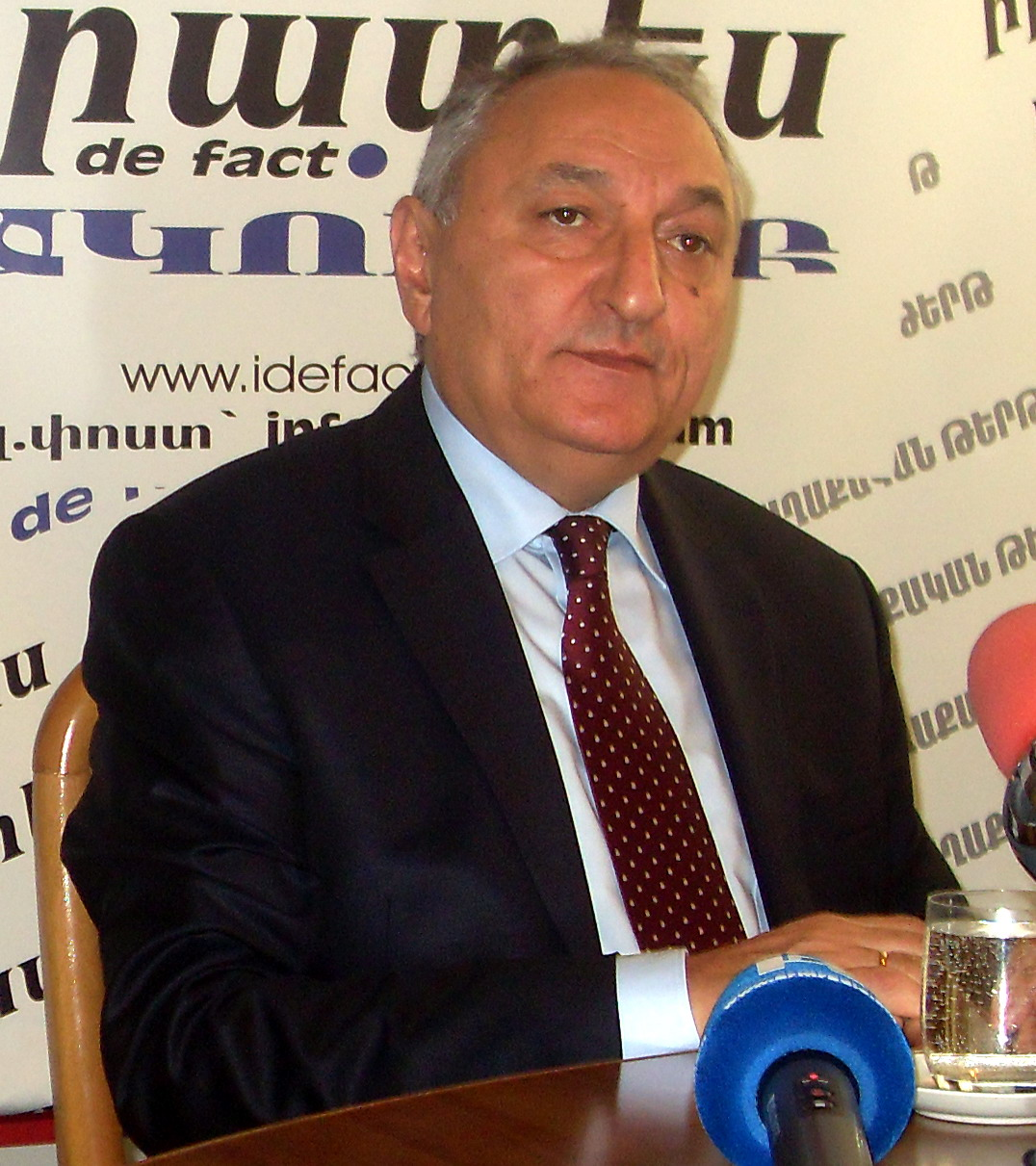
- Bostanjyan in 2014

Member of the National Assembly of Armenia
- In office 2 May 1999 – 12 September 2003

Ambassador of the National Assembly of Armenia
- In office 17 March 2007 – 17 August 2025

Personal details
- Born: 9 September 1949 Yerevan, Armenian SSR, USSR
- Died: 17 August 2025 (aged 75) Yerevan, Armenia
- Party: Prosperous Armenia
- Education: Yerevan State University

Vardan Babkeni Bostanjyan (Armenian: Վարդան Բաբկենի Բոստանջյան; 9 September 1949 – 17 August 2025) was an Armenian politician. A member of the Prosperous Armenia, he served in the National Assembly of Armenia from 1999 to 2003, and was the ambassador of the Assembly from 12 May 2007.

Bostanjyan died in Yerevan on 17 August 2025, at the age of 75.
