= Mykola Tabola =

Ukrainian oncologist (1952–2025)

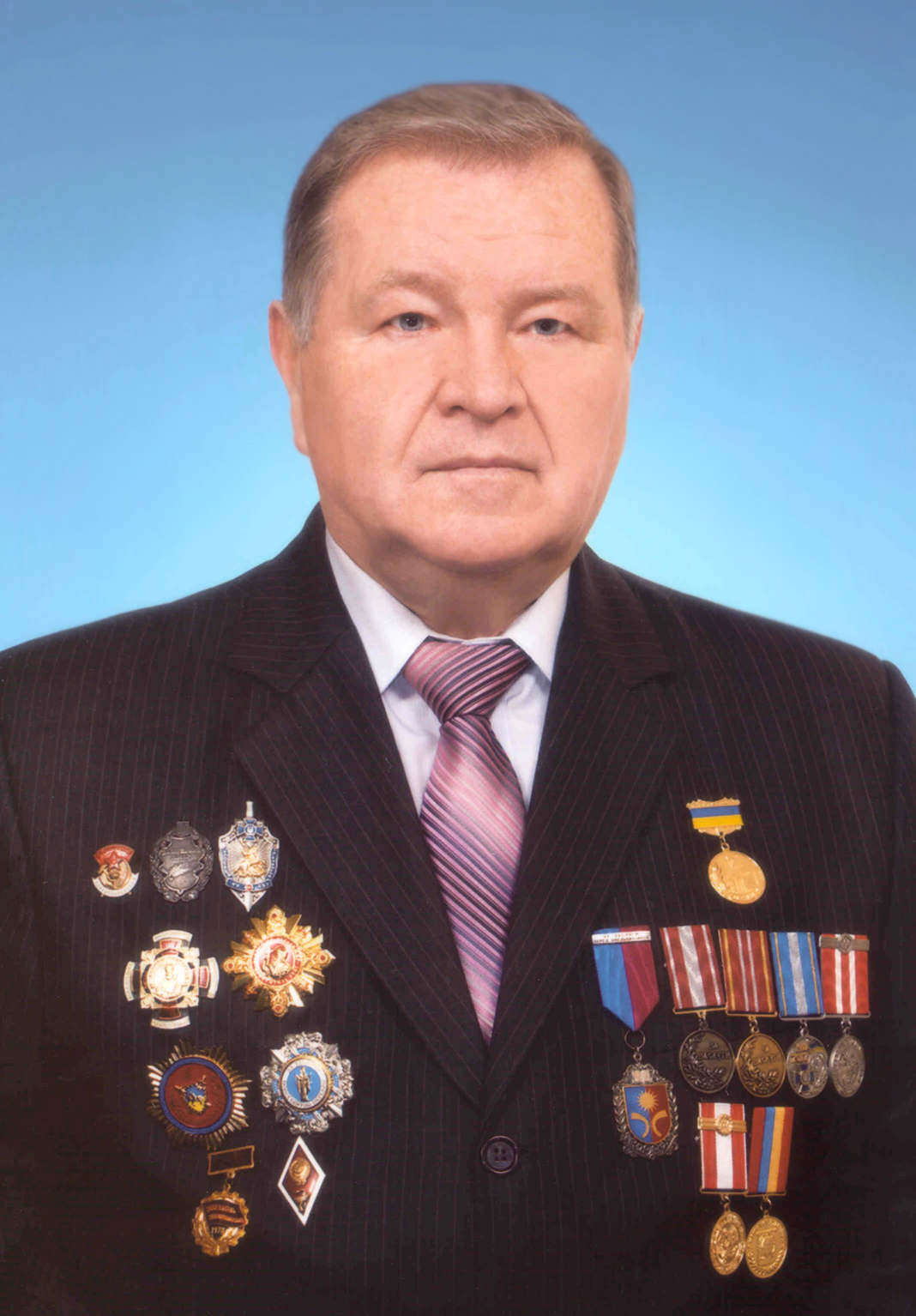
Tabola

Mykola Mykhaylovych Tabola (Ukrainian: Микола Михайлович Табо́ла; 9 September 1952 – 7 August 2025) was a Ukrainian oncologist.

== Life and career ==
Tabola was born on 9 September 1952 in Khmelnytskyi. He played a pioneering role in establishing modern examination and treatment methods in the regional oncology dispensary, notably performing the first liver surgery in the region in 1998. Throughout his career, he authored over a hundred scientific articles related to oncological care.

Tabola died on 7 August 2025, at the age of 72.
