= Jaume Obrador Soler =

Spanish social activist (1940–2025)

Jaume Obrador Soler (1940 – 8 August 2025) was a Spanish missionary, politician and social activist.

== Life and career ==
Obrador Soler was ordained a priest in 1966. From 1966 to 1972, he worked as a missionary in Burundi. He carried out his activity in Gitongo and Bugenyuzi. Returning to Mallorca, he became secularized in 1973. He joined the JOC (Joventut Obrera Cristiana) and participated in the neighbourhood movement of Palma through the neighbourhood commissions, in hiding, which later became anti-capitalist neighbourhood platforms. Later he participated in the promotion of the first neighbourhood associations (1973–1974). He was a member of the Communist Workers' Circles and, later, of the OEC (Communist Left Organization). In 1979, he was elected councillor of the Palma City Council by the PSM (Socialist Party of Mallorca). In 1981, he left office and participated in the constitution of Esquerra Mallorquina (1981–1983). In 1995, he was the founder of "Neighbours Without Borders" (VSF), made up of people linked to the Federation of Neighbourhood Associations of Palma, of which he was the president.

Obrador Soler died on 8 August 2025.

== Awards and honours ==
In 2018, Obrador Soler was awarded the Rosa Bueno Prize by Palma City Council for his promotion of citizen participation as a tool for social transformation.
