= Rokeya Begum (Satkhira politician) =

Bangladeshi politician (died 2025)

Member of Bangladesh Parliament
- In office 2005–2006

Personal details
- Died: 14 August 2025
- Party: Bangladesh Jamaat-e-Islami

Rokeya Begum (Bengali: রোকেয়া বেগম, Bengali pronunciation: [rokeja beɡom]; died 14 August 2025) was a politician of the Bangladesh Jamaat-e-Islami who was a member of the Bangladesh Parliament from a reserved seat.

== Life and career ==
Begum was elected to parliament from reserved seat as a candidate of the Bangladesh Jamaat-e-Islami in 2005. She was in office from 2005 to 2006. Begum died on 14 August 2025.
