= Priidik Kippar =

Estonian boxer and boxing coach (1943–2025)

- Born: 4 November 1943; Jõhvi, Reichskommissariat Ostland
- Died: 19 August 2025 (aged 81)
- Nationality: Estonian

Priidik Kippar (4 November 1943 – 19 August 2025) was an Estonian boxer and boxing coach. He was named the champion athlete of the Soviet Union in 1963.

Kippar died on 19 August 2025, at the age of 81.
