= Yuri Yeryomin =

Soviet and Russian theatre director (1944–2025)

Yeryomin

Yuri Ivanovich Yeryomin (Russian: Юрий Иванович Ерёмин; 9 March 1944 – 1 August 2025) was a Soviet and Russian theatre director.

== Life and career ==
Yeryomin was born in Kolomna, Moscow Oblast on 9 March 1944. After graduating from GITIS, he joined the troupe of the Moscow Youth Theater. From 1973 to 1977, he was the chief director of the Theater of the Young Spectator in Rostov-on-Don. From 1981–1987 he headed the Central Academic Theater of the Soviet Army. From 2000 he was a director at the Mossovet Theatre.

In 1986 he was awarded People's Artist of the RSFSR, and on 5 December 2014 he was awarded the Order of Honour.

Yeryomin died on 1 August 2025, at the age of 81.
