= Bang Yong-suk =

South Korean politician (1945–2025)

- 방용석

Minister of Labor
- In office 29 January 2002 – 26 February 2003
- President: Kim Dae-jung
- Preceded by: Yoo Yong-tae
- Succeeded by: Kwon Ki-hong

Personal details
- Born: 6 November 1945; Jincheon County, United States Army Military Government in Korea
- Died: 24 August 2025 (aged 79)
- Political party: Independent

Bang Yong-suk (Korean: 방용석; 6 November 1945 – 24 August 2025) was a South Korean politician. An independent, he served as Minister of Labor from 2002 to 2003.

Bang died on 24 August 2025, at the age of 79.
