= Bernard Springsteel =

American artist and sculptor (1930–2025)

Bernard Springsteel (December 24, 1930 – August 2, 2025) was an American artist, illustrator, designer and sculptor.

== Background ==
Springsteel was born in Dobbs Ferry, New York, on December 24, 1930. He graduated from the Pratt Institute in Brooklyn, New York, with a BFA in Illustration in 1953. Subsequently, he was employed in the role of art director at Good Housekeeping, McCall's and other magazines. He also acted as an illustrator and designer.

Springsteel died on August 2, 2025, in St. Augustine, Florida, where he resided for several years. He was 94.

== Work ==
In spite of his busy career as an art director in New York City, Springsteel painted in both oils and watercolors and also created sculptures on weekends and during vacations. His artistic works were centered on historic homes, barns, windmills and other structures as well as watercraft. Much of his work was created on the North and South Forks of Eastern Long Island where he vacationed with his family for many years and later resided. After his retirement, Springsteel devoted himself to watercolor painting and sculpture.

Springsteel was the author of six books - Carpentry & Rough Wood; Bernard Herbert Springsteel, A Life in Art, Volume 2 & Volume 3; Figure Drawing Through the Eyes of this Artist; and The Figure of Life.

He also built several wooden boats, numerous small wooden structures including sheds and bridges, and some furniture. Some of these works were featured in his book, Carpentry & Rough Wood.

Springsteel's work was featured in numerous art galleries in the Northeast. Examples of his work can be found in the permanent collections of the Pratt Institute, the Brooklyn Historical Society and the Bridgehampton Museum.

Springsteel formerly operated the Springsteel Art Gallery in Greenport, New York. In recognition of his artistic talent, Springsteel was elected to New York City's Prestigious Salmagundi Club, "one of the oldest art organizations in the United States", whose members have included such well-known artists as N. C. Wyeth, William Merritt Chase and Childe Hassam.

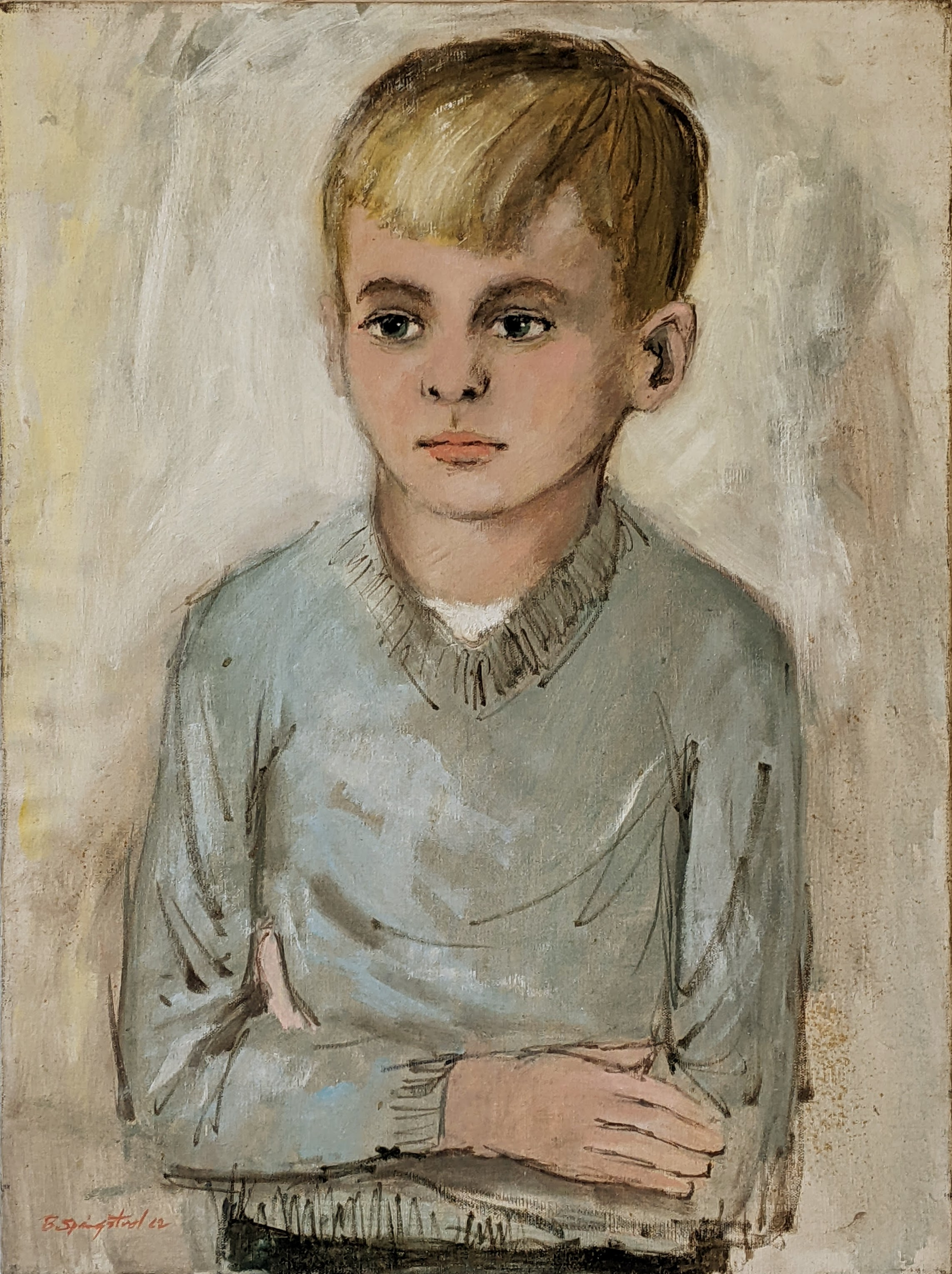
Portrait of Donald Bender by Bernard Springsteel.

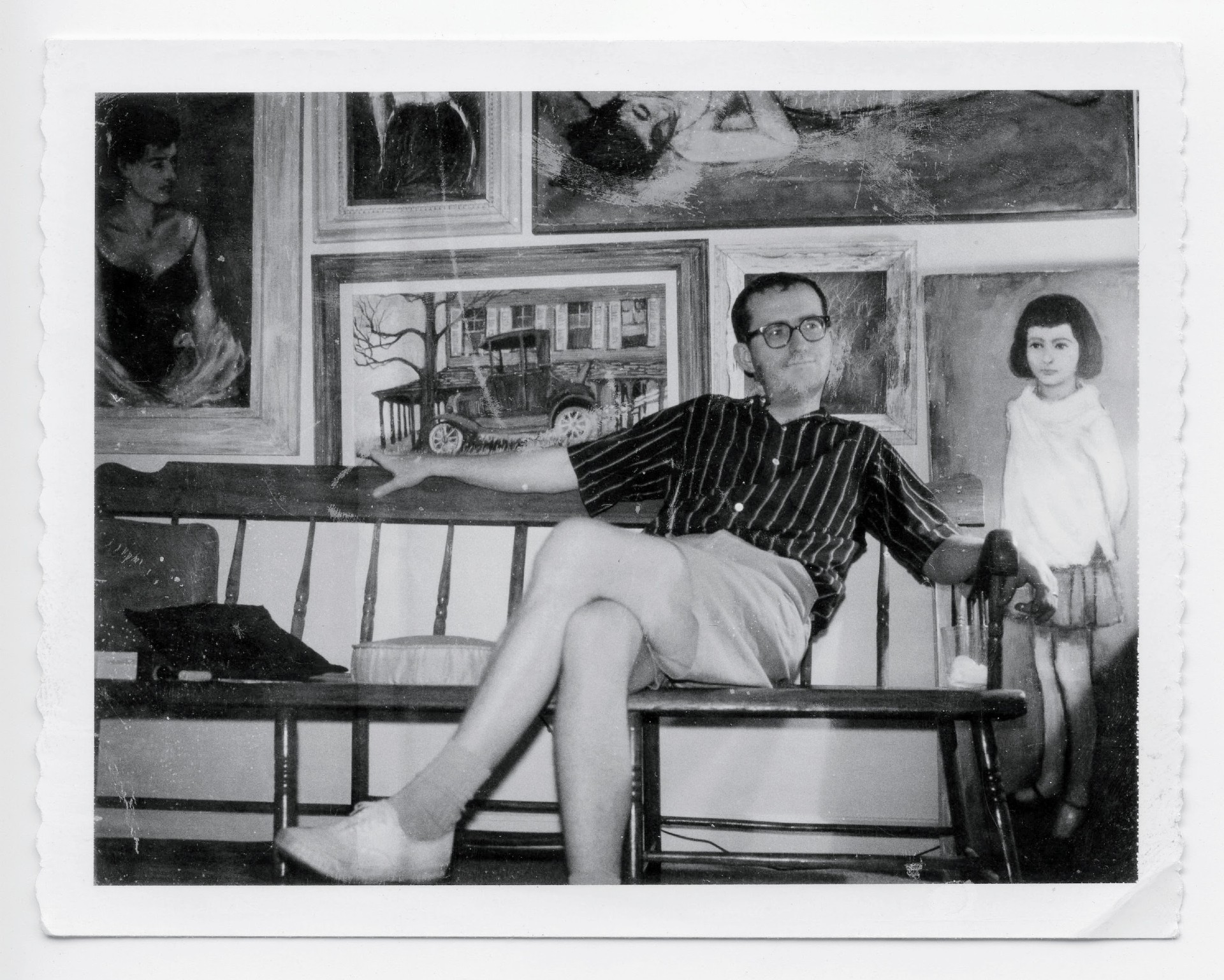
Artist Bernard Springsteel at home in West Orange, New Jersey.
