= Barbara Underwood (New Hampshire politician) =

American politician (1932–2025)

Member of New Hampshire House of Representatives
- In office 1970–1972
- In office 1974–1976
- In office 1978–1984

Personal details
- Born: April 6, 1932 New York City, U.S.
- Died: August 9, 2025 (aged 93) Lancaster, New Hampshire, U.S.
- Party: Republican; Democratic

Barbara Underwood (April 6, 1932 – August 9, 2025) was an American politician. She was a member of the New Hampshire House of Representatives.

In retirement, Underwood lived in Newport, Rhode Island, but had a seasonal home in Sugar Hill, New Hampshire. She died on August 9, 2025, at the age of 93.
