= Tricia Gardiner =

British equestrian (1935–2025)

Personal information
- Nationality: British
- Born: 16 August 1935 London, England
- Died: 20 August 2025 (aged 90)

Sport
- Sport: Equestrian

Tricia Gardiner (16 August 1935 – 20 August 2025) was a British equestrian. She competed in two events at the 1988 Summer Olympics. Gardiner died on 20 August 2025, at the age of 90.
