= Jane Kidd (equestrian) =

English equestrian (1943–2025)

Personal information
- Nationality: English
- Born: 3 June 1943 Leatherhead, Surrey, England
- Died: 21 August 2025 (aged 82)

Sport
- Sport: Equestrianism
- Event(s): Dressage, showjumping

Jane Kidd (3 June 1943 – 21 August 2025) was an English equestrian who authored more than 20 books. She was described by The Times as the "grande dame of British dressage." Kidd died on 21 August 2025, at the age of 82.
