= Deaths in December 2025 =

The following is a list of notable deaths in December 2025.

Entries for each day are listed alphabetically by surname. A typical entry lists information in the following sequence:

- Name, age, country of citizenship at birth, subsequent country of citizenship (if applicable), reason for notability, cause of death (if known), and reference.

== December 2025 ==
=== 1 ===
- Ann Bedsole, 95, American politician, member of the Alabama Senate (1982–1994).
- John Boulter, 94, British tenor (The Black and White Minstrel Show).
- Elden Campbell, 57, American basketball player (Los Angeles Lakers, Detroit Pistons, Charlotte Hornets), drowned.
- Peter Davis (British director), 93, British documentary filmmaker
- R. V. Devraj, 67, Indian politician, Karnataka MLA (2004–2008) and chairman of the KSRTC (2000–2007), cardiac arrest.
- Denis Durnian, 75, English golfer. (death announced on this date)
- Anicet Ekane, 74, Cameroonian politician.
- Ebo Elder, 46, American boxer, glioblastoma.
- Patrick Galan, 75, French journalist, photographer and historian.
- Osvaldo Giuntini, 89, Brazilian Roman Catholic prelate, auxiliary bishop (1982–1987), coadjutor bishop (1987–1992) and bishop of Marília (1992–2013).
- Hawk Wing, 26, American-bred Thoroughbred racehorse and sire, colic.
- Michel van Hulten, 95, Dutch politician and social geographer, state secretary for transport and water management (1973–1977), MP (1971–1973, 1977), prostate cancer.
- Assusete Magalhães, 76, Brazilian magistrate, judge of the Superior Court of Justice (2012–2024).
- Solan Mirisim, 47, Papua New Guinean politician.
- Gabriel Moiceanu, 91, Romanian Olympic cyclist (1960, 1964).
- Volodymyr Muntyan, 79, Ukrainian football player (Dynamo Kiev, Soviet Union national team) and manager (Guinea national team).
- Bruce Niemi, 76, American politician, member of the Oklahoma House of Representatives (1991–1993).
- Nicola Pietrangeli, 92, Italian Hall of Fame tennis player.
- Poorstacy, 26, American musician, suicide by gunshot.
- Coleen Seng, 89, American politician, mayor of Lincoln, Nebraska (2003–2007).
- Luci Shaw, 96, British-American poet and essayist.
- Robin Smith, 62, South African-born English cricketer (Natal, Hampshire, England national team).
- Michael Turner, 91, British illustrator, skin cancer.
- Uthopia, 24, British dressage horse, Olympic champion (2012), euthanised.
- Valegro, 23, British dressage horse, Olympic champion (2012), euthanised.
- Hennie van Zyl, 89, South African rugby union player (Transvaal, national team).
- Antonio Vargiu, 88, Italian Olympic field hockey player (1960), injuries sustained in a traffic collision.
- Vũ Ngọc Hải, 94, Vietnamese politician, minister of industry and trade (1987–1992).
- Hugh Wallace, 68, Irish architect.

=== 2 ===
- Moustafa Ali, 59, Egyptian-born Canadian football player (Winnipeg Blue Bombers, Calgary Stampeders), complications from amyotrophic lateral sclerosis.
- Michael Annett, 39, American racing driver (NASCAR, ARCA Menards Series).
- Anatoli Belyayev, 73, Belarusian ice hockey player (Dinamo Minsk, Dynamo Moscow).
- Olga Cardoso, 91, Portuguese radio announcer, television presenter, and singer.
- Loveday Carlyon, 77, British Cornish nationalist.
- José Luis Cienfuegos, 60–61, Spanish festival programmer and cultural manager, aneurysm.
- Claude, 30, American albino alligator, liver cancer.
- Ena Collymore-Woodstock, 108, Jamaican barrister and magistrate.
- Constança Cunha e Sá, 67, Portuguese journalist and political commentator.
- Daniel Dagallier, 99, French fencer, Olympic bronze medalist (1956).
- Darwin Deason, 85, American information technology services founder (Affiliated Computer Services).
- Marvin Hinton, 85, English footballer (Charlton Athletic, Chelsea).
- Kseniya Kachalina, 54, Russian actress (Over the Dark Water, Three Sisters).
- Essau Kanyenda, 43, Malawian footballer (FC Rostov, Polokwane City, national team), liver cancer.
- Marianne Larsen, 74, Danish poet and writer.
- Estuardo Masías, 85, Peruvian Olympic rower.
- David Matalon, 82, American film producer (What's Eating Gilbert Grape, Color of Night), co-founder of TriStar Pictures.
- Arnfinn Nesset, 89, Norwegian convicted serial killer.
- James H. Payne, 84, American jurist, judge (since 2001) of the U.S. District Courts of Eastern, Northern and Western Oklahoma and chief judge (2002–2017) of the U.S. District Court of Eastern Oklahoma.
- Adrian Pleșca, 64, Romanian singer, stroke.
- Sir Alec Reed, 91, British recruitment executive and philanthropist, founder of Reed and The Big Give.
- Rudi Tröger, 96, German painter and academic.
- Arcadio Venturi, 96, Italian footballer (Roma, Inter Milan, national team).
- Lesley Walker, 80, British film editor (Mona Lisa, Mamma Mia!, The Fisher King).
- Alice S. Whittemore, 89, American epidemiologist and biostatistician.
- Margaret Jane Wray, 62, American soprano.

=== 3 ===
- Devin Battley, 75, American motorcycle racer and businessman.
- Wojciech Błasiak, 73, Polish politician, MP (1993–1997).
- Jaakko Blomberg, 83, Finnish diplomat.
- Luigi Bonazzi, 77, Italian Roman Catholic prelate, apostolic nuncio to Haiti (1999–2004), Canada (2013–2020) and Albania (2020–2025).
- Bernard Charlot, 81, French academic and educational scientist.
- D. L. Coburn, 87, American playwright (The Gin Game), colon cancer.
- Kevin Coe, 78, American serial rapist.
- Steve Cropper, 84, American Hall of Fame guitarist (Booker T. & the M.G.'s), songwriter ("In the Midnight Hour") and record producer ("(Sittin' On) The Dock of the Bay"), two-time Grammy winner.
- Jean-Jacques Croteau, 95, Canadian politician, Quebec MNA (1969–1970).
- R. Bruce Dold, 70, American journalist (Chicago Tribune), esophageal cancer.
- Epy Kusnandar, 61, Indonesian actor (Preman Pensiun, Petualangan Sherina, The Night Comes for Us), brainstem stroke.
- Moisés Fontela, 87, Argentine engineer and politician, deputy (1989–1993) and mayor of Castelli Partido (1987–1989).
- Brian Havelock, 83, British motorcycle speedway rider.
- Beena Masroor, 67, Pakistani actress (Dil Banjaara, Aangan, Betiyaan), writer and director.
- Dave Monk, 72, British broadcaster, pancreatic cancer.
- Maudie Palmer, Australian curatrix.
- Whitney Paul, 72, American football player (Kansas City Chiefs, New Orleans Saints).
- Ted Pickering, 86, Australian politician, New South Wales MLC (1976–1995).
- Theodor Pištěk, 93, Czech artist and costume designer (Amadeus, Valmont, The People vs. Larry Flynt), Oscar winner (1985).
- Mohammed Rahmatullah, 87, Indian football player (Kolkata Mohammedan, national team) and manager (Pakistan national team).
- Nadiya Sabeh, 32, Ivorian actress and content creator, breast cancer.
- Abdulaziz Sachedina, 83, Tanzanian-born American Islamic scholar.
- Charles Norman Shay, 101, American army medic (16th Infantry Regiment) and writer.
- Rodica Stănoiu, 86, Romanian jurist and politician, senator (1996–2000, 2004–2008).
- Maurizio Thermes, 86, Italian footballer (Sambenedettese, Foggia, Cosenza).
- Naĭden Vŭlchev, 98, Bulgarian poet and translator.

=== 4 ===
- Yasser Abu Shabab, 31, Palestinian militia leader (Popular Forces), shot.
- José Luis Alonso Coomonte, 93, Spanish sculptor and academic (University of Salamanca).
- Muho Asllani, 88, Albanian politician, MP (1982–1991).
- Andrew Bakun, 86, American oceanographer.
- Mabel Bocchi, 72, Italian Hall of Fame basketball player (national team).
- Michael Boulter, 83, British paleontologist.
- Giuseppe Caroli, 93, Italian politician, deputy (1968–1994).
- Sergey Dubinin, 74, Russian economist and politician, minister of finance (1994), president of the Central Bank of Russia (1995–1998).
- Ted Egan, 93, Australian folk singer and civil servant, administrator of the Northern Territory (2003–2007).
- Robert B. Fiske, 94, American trial attorney, U.S. attorney for the Southern District of New York (1976–1980), pancreatic cancer.
- Steve Hertz, 80, American baseball player (Houston Colt .45s).
- Swaraj Kaushal, 73, Indian lawyer and politician, MP (1998–2004) and governor of Mizoram (1990–1993).
- Faouzi Khidr, 75, Egyptian journalist and writer.
- Rafał Kołsut, 35, Polish voice actor.
- Roy Kramer, 96, American college football coach (Central Michigan Chippewas) and athletics administrator (Vanderbilt Commodores, Southeastern Conference).
- Roger Lumont, 91, French artistic director and actor (Gendarme in New York, Children of Mata Hari, Litan).
- Ivan Makedonskyi, 83, Ukrainian politician, deputy (1990–1992).
- Eduardo Manzano, 87, Mexican comedian and actor (The Popcorn Chronicles, One for the Road, La hija de Moctezuma).
- Budoy Marabiles, 54, Filipino reggae singer (Junior Kilat).
- Sir Patrick McNair-Wilson, 96, British politician, MP (1964–1966, 1968–1997).
- Pops Mohamed, 75, South African jazz musician.
- Charles Mullins, 91, American physician.
- Milan Nakonečný, 93, Czech psychologist, historian and academic.
- Arunee Nanthiwat, 69, Thai voice actress.
- Paolo Nuvoli, 90, Italian politician, president of Molise (1985–1988).
- Claire Ortiz Hill, 74, American scholar and translator.
- Edward Gabriel Risi, 76, South African Roman Catholic prelate, bishop of Keimoes–Upington (since 2000).
- Emile van Rouveroy van Nieuwaal, 86, Dutch constitutional lawyer and Africanist.
- M. Saravanan, 85, Indian film producer (Naanum Oru Penn, Samsaram Adhu Minsaram, Sivaji: The Boss).
- Cary-Hiroyuki Tagawa, 75, American actor (Licence to Kill, Mortal Kombat, The Man in the High Castle), complications from a stroke.
- Charles R. Tolbert, 89, American astronomer.
- Lee Wright, 81, Canadian Olympic field hockey player (1964, 1976), complications from Alzheimer's disease.
- Tetsu Yamauchi, 79, Japanese bassist (Free, Faces).

=== 5 ===
- Josh Becker, 67, American film and television director (Xena: Warrior Princess) and screenwriter.
- Claude Boucher, 83, Canadian politician, Quebec MNA (1994–2007).
- Bung Moktar Radin, 66, Malaysian politician, MP (since 1999) and Sabah State MLA (since 2020), kidney failure and lung infection.
- Mario Busquets Jordá, 90, Spanish Roman Catholic prelate, bishop of Territorial Prelature of Chuquibamba (2001–2015).
- Camryn, 26, American singer, injuries sustained in traffic collision.
- Vasile Carauș, 37, Moldovan footballer (Metalurh Zaporizhzhia, Dacia Chișinău, national team), cancer.
- Chen Chin-hsing, 90, Taiwanese politician, MP (2002–2005) and magistrate of Hsinchu County (1981–1989).
- Bruce Eastick, 98, Australian politician, speaker of the South Australian House of Assembly (1978–1982).
- Kenneth W. Ford, 99, American theoretical physicist and writer.
- Frank Gehry, 96, Canadian-American architect (Guggenheim Museum Bilbao, Gehry Residence, Louis Vuitton Foundation), respiratory illness.
- Sandro Giacobbe, 75, Italian singer-songwriter, prostate cancer.
- Patrik Hezucký, 55, Czech radio presenter, liver cancer.
- Nick Joanides, 55, American racing driver (ARCA Menards Series).
- Kris Kalifatidis, 67, Australian soccer player (South Melbourne FC, national team).
- Mark Jay Mirsky, 86, American writer and academic, co-founder of Fiction.
- David Mulwa, 80, Kenyan writer.
- Alex R. Munson, 84, American jurist, judge (since 1988) and chief judge (1988–2010) of the District Court for the Northern Mariana Islands.
- Wolfgang Petrick, 86, German painter.
- Jürgen Raps, 74, German pilot and aviation manager.
- Herbert W. Roesky, 90, German chemist.
- Alex Sánchez, 95, Costa Rican footballer (Saprissa, Alajuelense, national team).
- Gerhard Scheu, 82, German politician, MP (1983–2002).
- Dirk Schreyer, 81, German rower, Olympic champion (1968).
- Matti Sundelin, 91, Finnish footballer (TPS, national team).
- Simone Tata, 95, Swiss-born Indian cosmetics and retail industry executive, chairwoman of Lakmé Cosmetics (1982–1996) and Trent Limited (1996–2006).
- Alfonso Ussía, 77, Spanish writer and journalist.
- Marius van der Merwe, 40–41, South African security company owner, shot.
- Bevan Spencer von Einem, 79, Australian convicted child murderer.
- Wang Xun, 91, Chinese academic and physicist.

=== 6 ===
- Khosrow Alikordi, 46, Iranian lawyer and human rights activist, cardiac arrest.
- Kate Allsop, 71, British politician, mayor of Mansfield (2015–2019).
- Fiorenza de Bernardi, 97, Italian commercial airline pilot, co-founder of Aertirrena.
- Christian de Chalonge, 88, French film director and screenwriter (The Wedding Ring, The Roaring Forties).
- Patrick Cooney, 94, Irish politician, senator (1977–1981), minister for defence (1982–1986) and justice (1973–1977).
- Erzsébet Csajbók, 72, Hungarian Olympic handball player (1976, 1980).
- Alfredo Díaz Figueroa, 56, Venezuelan politician, governor of Nueva Esparta (2017–2021), heart attack.
- Oľga Feldeková, 82, Slovak writer.
- Reounodji Gabin, 38, Chadian painter and artist, traffic collision.
- Pierre-Paul Geoffroy, 81, Canadian Quebec nationalist militant (Front de libération du Québec).
- Denar Joseph Hamisi, 56, Kenyan politician, MP (since 2022).
- Tom Hicks, 79, American sports owner (Liverpool F.C., Texas Rangers) and private equity investor, co-founder of HM Capital Partners, heart and lung disease.
- Henry Howes, 96, British Olympic speed skater (1948). (death announced on this date)
- Rafael Ithier, 99, Puerto Rican salsa musician (El Gran Combo).
- Napoleon Jones-Henderson, 82, American artist.
- Jerry Kasenetz, 82, American music producer ("Yummy Yummy Yummy", "Little Bit O' Soul", "Simon Says"), fall.
- Jonah Kinigstein, 102, American artist.
- Byron Knutson, 96, American politician, member of the North Dakota House of Representatives (1958–1962).
- Viacheslav Kryshtofovych, 78, Ukrainian film director (Adam's Rib, A Friend of the Deceased), screenwriter and actor.
- Aleksandr Matsegora, 70, Russian diplomat, ambassador to North Korea (since 2014).
- Viktor Miroshnichenko, 66, Ukrainian boxer, Olympic silver medallist (1980).
- Martin Parr, 73, British photographer and photojournalist, cancer.
- Abdul Rashid, 46, Pakistani Olympic hurdler (2008), heart attack.
- Esko Seppänen, 79, Finnish politician, MP (1987–1996) and MEP (1996–2009).
- Dan J. Stein, 63, South African psychiatrist and academic.
- Bill Sutton, 81, British-born New Zealand politician, MP (1984–1990).
- Tito Topin, 93, French writer and illustrator.
- Manolo Villanova, 83, Spanish football player (Betis, Zaragoza) and manager (Zaragoza).
- Michael J. Williams, 82, American general.
- Hubert Zandstra, 85, Indonesian-born Canadian agronomist.

=== 7 ===
- Marc Alyn, 88, French poet and writer.
- Joseph Sirima Bissiri, 72, Burkinabé politician, Burkina Faso MNA.
- Rachael Carpani, 45, Australian actress (McLeod's Daughters, Against the Wall, Home and Away), chronic illness.
- Kalyan Chatterjee, 83, Indian actor (Pratidwandi, Sabuj Dwiper Raja, Antarjali Jatra), complications from typhoid fever.
- Christine Choy, 73, American filmmaker (Who Killed Vincent Chin?).
- Piotr Cieplak, 65, Polish stage director.
- Glen De Boeck, 54, Belgian football player (Anderlecht, national team) and manager (Cercle Brugge), cerebral haemorrhage.
- Thomas E. Dewberry, 74, American politician and judge, member of the Maryland House of Delegates (1989–2002), complications from heart disease and pneumonia.
- Anita Guerreiro, 89, Portuguese actress and fado singer.
- Tiit Härm, 79, Estonian ballet dancer, master and choreographer.
- Sven Hotz, 96, Swiss property dealer and football club president (FC Zürich).
- Sandra Segal Ikuta, 71, American jurist, judge of the U.S. Court of Appeals for the Ninth Circuit (since 2006), pancreatic cancer.
- Rolf Jähnichen, 86, German politician, member of the Landtag of Saxony (1994–1999).
- Peg Kehret, 89, American author (Earthquake Terror, I'm Not Who You Think I Am, Small Steps: The Year I Got Polio).
- Irène Lindon, 74, French publisher, director of Les Éditions de Minuit (2001–2021).
- Jean-Gilles Malliarakis, 81, French politician and writer.
- Jimmy Mariano, 84, Filipino basketball player (Ysmael Steel Admirals) and coach (Great Taste Coffee Makers, UE Red Warriors).
- Lajos Marton, 94, Hungarian anti-communist activist.
- Adnan Mroueh, 89, Lebanese physician and politician, minister of public health (1982–1984) and tourism (1983–1984).
- Nala, 5–6, British tabby cat (Stevenage railway station).
- Stephen Pearton, 68, Australian-born American materials scientist.
- C. Rajadurai, 98, Sri Lankan politician, MP (1956–1989). (death announced on this date)
- Matylda Růžičková-Šínová, 92, Czech gymnast, Olympic silver medallist (1960) and bronze medallist (1952).
- Volodymyr Sysenko, 63, Ukrainian football player (Pamir Dushanbe, Dinamo Samarqand) and manager (Poltava).
- Baruch Tenembaum, 92, Argentine interfaith activist.
- Ramón Trujillo Carreño, 94, Spanish linguist.
- Frans Weisz, 87, Dutch film director (The Burglar, A Gangstergirl, Red Sien), complications from Alzheimer's disease.

=== 8 ===
- Baba Adhav, 95, Indian social and labor activist and author.
- Poul Andersen, 73, Danish politician, MP (1990–2011).
- Wolfgang Baake, 75, German theologian and journalist.
- Tom Copeland, 101, American politician, member (1957–1973) and speaker (1970–1971) of the Washington House of Representatives.
- Iain Douglas-Hamilton, 83, British zoologist and wildlife conservationist (Save the Elephants).
- Detlef Enge, 73, German footballer (1. FC Magdeburg).
- Gordon Goodwin, 70, American musician (Big Phat Band), composer and conductor, four-time Grammy Award winner, pancreatic cancer.
- Masato Harada, 76, Japanese film director (Climber's High, Chronicle of My Mother) and actor (Fearless).
- Bill Hauritz, 73, Australian festival director.
- Kate Ho, 53, British-American economist, cancer.
- Hiroaki Inoue, 81, Japanese baseball player (Hiroshima Toyo, Chunichi Dragons, Hokkaido-Nippon), hypovolemic shock.
- Arthur Konrad, 91, Liechtensteiner politician, mayor of Vaduz (1980–1995).
- Jaroslav Kubín, 78, Czech politician, senator (2000–2006), member of the Zlín Regional Assembly (2000–2004, 2008–2012).
- Rosa Leal de Pérez, 71, Guatemalan psychologist, first lady (2012–2015).
- Félix Leyzour, 93, French politician, deputy (1997–2002) and mayor of Callac (1983–2008).
- Raul Malo, 60, American musician (The Mavericks) and songwriter ("All You Ever Do Is Bring Me Down", "Dance the Night Away"), Grammy winner (1996), colon and leptomeningeal cancer.
- Eamon Melaugh, 92, Irish political activist.
- José Filomeno Monteiro, 70, Cape Verdean diplomat and politician, minister of foreign affairs (2024–2025).
- George C. Pratt, 97, American jurist, judge of the U.S. District Court for Eastern New York (1976–1982) and U.S. Court of Appeals for the Second Circuit (1982–1995).
- Bill Ratliff, 89, American politician, lieutenant governor of Texas (2000–2003) and member of the Texas Senate (1989–2004).
- Hans Roericht, 93, German designer.
- Eila Roine, 94, Finnish actress (The Big Freeze, Trench Road, Skavabölen pojat).
- Ioan Sdrobiș, 79, Romanian football manager (Oțelul Galați, Selena Bacău, Universitatea Cluj).
- Stan Shillington, 90, Canadian lacrosse historian and sportswriter.
- Jubilant Sykes, 71, American baritone, stabbed.
- Radu Theodoru, 101, Romanian general, writer and Holocaust denier.
- Wang Bingqian, 100, Chinese economist and politician, minister of finance (1980–1992), state councillor (1983–1993), and vice chairperson of the SCNPC (1993–1998).
- Cora Weiss, 91, American human rights activist.
- John Noble Wilford, 92, American journalist (The New York Times) and author, prostate cancer.
- William Yap, 24, Malaysian actor (The Kid from the Big Apple).
- Yun Il-bong, 91, South Korean actor (Suddenly at Midnight, Oyster Village, Obaltan).

=== 9 ===
- Bob Allen, 79, American basketball player (San Francisco Warriors).
- Ludovic Assemoassa, 45, Togolese footballer (Clermont Foot, Granada 74, national team).
- Bai Tianhui, 47, Chinese politician, executed.
- David Best, 82, English footballer (Bournemouth, Ipswich, Oldham).
- Frank Bruneel, 90, American politician, member of the Idaho House of Representatives (1994–2002).
- Arthur L. Carter, 93, American banker, publisher and visual artist.
- Dixie Deans, 79, Scottish footballer (Motherwell, Celtic, national team).
- Octave Houdégbé, 80, Beninese politician, deputy (2015–2023).
- Jorge Ilegal, 70, Spanish musician, pancreatic cancer.
- Kym Ireland, 70, Australian Olympic field hockey player (1984), cancer.
- Kim Ji-mee, 85, South Korean actress (Cruel Youth, Wang-geon, the Great, Gilsotteum), complications from shingles.
- D. G. Martin, 85, American lawyer and politician.
- George Mira, 83, American football player (San Francisco 49ers, Philadelphia Eagles, Montreal Alouettes).
- Ross Morrison, 88, New Zealand cricketer (Auckland) and tennis administrator.
- Rod Paige, 92, American academic, football coach (Jackson State Tigers, Texas Southern Tigers) and government official, U.S. secretary of education (2001–2005).
- Béatrice Picard, 96, Canadian actress (Once Upon a Time in the East, The Outlander, My Aunt Aline).
- Clara Pinto-Correia, 65, Portuguese novelist and journalist.
- Pablo Rodríguez Grez, 87, Chilean politician and lawyer, founder of Fatherland and Liberty.
- Ilya M. Sobol', 99, Russian mathematician (Sobol sequence, Sobol indices).
- Ueli Sutter, 78, Swiss Olympic cyclist (1972).
- Nobuhiro Takashiro, 71, Japanese baseball player (Hokkaido Nippon-Ham Fighters) and coach (Chunichi Dragons, Hanshin Tigers), esophageal cancer.
- Jeff Thorne, 52, American college football coach (North Central Cardinals, Western Michigan Broncos), stomach cancer.
- Marcelo VIPs, 49, Brazilian business consultant, complications from cirrhosis.
- Jeff Wexler, 78, American sound engineer (The Last Samurai, Independence Day, Almost Famous), kidney disease.
- Jean-Pierre Winter, 74, French psychoanalyst and writer.
- Rodolfo Wirz, 83, German-born Uruguayan Roman Catholic prelate, bishop of Maldonado-Punta del Este (1985–2018).

=== 10 ===
- Lewis Entz, 94, American politician, member of the Colorado House of Representatives (1983–1999) and Senate (2001–2007).
- Rafael Leónidas Felipe y Núñez, 87, Dominican Roman Catholic prelate, bishop of Barahona (1999–2015).
- Sergio Flamigni, 100, Italian politician, deputy (1968–1979) and senator (1979–1987), and writer.
- Jeff Garcia, 50, American comedian and actor (Jimmy Neutron: Boy Genius, Barnyard, Mr. Box Office), complications from a collapsed lung.
- Efraín Goldenberg, 95, Peruvian politician, prime minister (1994–1995), minister of economy (1999–2000) and foreign affairs (1993–1995).
- Richard Grégoire, 81, Canadian film (Being at Home with Claude, Exit) and television composer (Les Filles de Caleb).
- Roberto Iniesta, 63, Spanish singer (Extremoduro).
- Manit Jitchan-Klab, 87, Thai politician.
- Sophie Kinsella, 55, English novelist (Shopaholic, Can You Keep a Secret?, The Undomestic Goddess), glioblastoma.
- Robbie Kondor, 70, American film composer (Happiness, The Suburbans, Forever Fabulous), arranger and session musician, prion disease.
- Marian Kotleba, 73, Slovak basketball player (BK Inter Bratislava, Dukla Olomouc, Czechoslovakia national team).
- Annemarie Kuhn, 88, German politician, MEP (1990–1999).
- Lee Hae-gu, 88, South Korean politician, MP (1988–2000, 2002–2004).
- Manfrini, 75, Brazilian footballer (Fluminense, Botafogo, Ponte Preta).
- Carmelo Miceli, 67, Italian footballer (Lecce, Ascoli, Catanzaro), heart attack.
- Jacques Morier-Genoud, 91, Swiss politician, member of the Grand Council of Vaud (1966–1975) and the Council of States (1975–1979).
- Jacques Nadeau, 72, Canadian photojournalist (Le Devoir, The New York Times, The Globe and Mail), cancer.
- Bernardo P. Pardo, 93, Filipino jurist, associate justice of the Supreme Court (1998–2002) and Chairman of the Commission on Elections (1995–1998).
- Ingrid Seeler, 97, German politician, member of the Hamburg Parliament (1974–1986).
- Michelle Simson, 72, Canadian politician, MP (2008–2011).
- Eddie Thornton, 94, Jamaican trumpeter (Georgie Fame and the Blue Flames).
- John Varley, 78, American author (Titan, Millennium, Steel Beach).
- Jim Ward, 66, American voice actor (Ratchet & Clank, The Fairly OddParents) and radio personality (The Stephanie Miller Show), complications from Alzheimer's disease.
- Christopher Wegelius, 81, Finnish Olympic equestrian (1980).

=== 11 ===
- Stanley Baxter, 99, Scottish actor (Crooks Anonymous, Very Important Person) and comedian (The Stanley Baxter Show), BAFTA winner (1961).
- Jean Bedford, 79, English-born Australian writer.
- May Britt, 91, Swedish actress (War and Peace, The Young Lions, The Blue Angel).
- Stan Brookes, 72, English footballer (Doncaster Rovers).
- John Carey, 91, British literary critic.
- Chuzo, 85, Spanish footballer (Atlético Madrid, Málaga, national team).
- Harouna Coulibaly, 63, Nigerien writer and film director.
- Jean Dupont, 87, French racing cyclist.
- Lawrence Ewhrudjakpo, 60, Nigerian politician, senator (2019–2020).
- John Fentener van Vlissingen, 86, Dutch businessman.
- Janet Fish, 87, American realist artist.
- Ceal Floyer, 57, Pakistani-born British visual artist.
- David Gold, 75, American talk radio host (KLIF, KSFO).
- Siegfried Herrmann, 83, Austrian politician, member of the Landtag of Styria (1987–1991), member of the Federal Council (1991–1994).
- Junior King, 28–29, South African dancer, TikTok personality and rapper, traffic collision.
- Kim Woo-nam, 70, South Korean politician, MP (2004–2016), heart attack.
- Glória de Matos, 89, Portuguese actress, heart failure.
- Ernest McCarty, 84, American bass player.
- Gerald McCormick, 63, American politician, member of the Tennessee House of Representatives (2004–2018), complications from amyotrophic lateral sclerosis.
- Jenista Mhagama, 58, Tanzanian politician, MNA (since 2015).
- Meja Mwangi, 76, Kenyan writer (Kill Me Quick, Carcase for Hounds, The Mzungu Boy).
- Harold Wayne Nichols, 64, American serial rapist and convicted murderer, execution by lethal injection.
- Guy Pessiot, 76, French journalist and politician.
- Sylvia Pengilly, 90, British-born American musician and composer.
- Susana Rossberg, 80, Brazilian-born Belgian film editor (Home Sweet Home, Toto the Hero, The Eighth Day).
- Patrick Rylands, 83, English toy designer, vascular dementia.
- Władysław Siemaszko, 106, Polish publicist, lawyer, and author.
- Boris Skrynnik, 77, Russian bandy player (Vodnik Arkhangelsk) and executive, president of the FIB (2005–2022).
- Sam Sommers, 86, American racing driver.
- Georg Springer, 79, Austrian cultural manager.
- Keith Suter, 77, Australian social scientist.
- Joanna Trollope, 82, English novelist (A Village Affair).
- Nermin Abadan Unat, 104, Turkish sociologist and politician, senator (1978–1980).
- Charles Weissmann, 94, Hungarian-Swiss molecular biologist.

=== 12 ===
- Ernesto Acher, 86, Argentine comedian (Les Luthiers), musician, and actor.
- Ahmad Alizadeh, 86, Iranian politician, MP (1980–1984).
- Adamu Baikie, 94, Nigerian educationist.
- Rolf Becker, 90, German actor (In aller Freundschaft, Ein Lied von Liebe und Tod, Nevermore).
- Amato Berardi, 67, Italian-American politician, deputy (2008–2013), heart attack.
- Laila Bokhari, 51, Norwegian political scientist and politician, member of the Gjørv Report commission.
- Françoise Brion, 92, French actress (L'Immortelle, Nelly and Mr. Arnaud, Le Divorce).
- Bob Burns III, 90, American actor (The Ghost Busters, Rat Pfink a Boo Boo, The Naked Monster), archivist and historian.
- David Carlin, 87, American politician, member of the Rhode Island Senate (1981–1993).
- Carl Carlton, 73, American singer ("Everlasting Love", "She's a Bad Mama Jama (She's Built, She's Stacked)") and songwriter, heart problems.
- Arthur Cohn, 98, Swiss film producer (The Garden of the Finzi-Continis, Black and White in Color, One Day in September).
- Adolfo Fernández, 67, Spanish actor (Águila roja, Policías, en el corazón de la calle, Un buen novio).
- Werner Ferrari, 78, Swiss serial killer.
- Susie Figgis, 77, British casting director (Harry Potter and the Philosopher's Stone, The Full Monty, The Killing Fields), cancer.
- James H. Flatley III, 91, American naval rear admiral.
- Hans Flock, 85, Norwegian judge.
- Pere Font Moles, 99, Andorran politician, cultural activist and printing businessman, member of the General Council (1964–1967, 1970–1973).
- Ken Greatorex, 89, English rugby league player (Featherstone Rovers).
- Peter Greene, 60, American actor (Pulp Fiction, The Mask, Clean, Shaven), injuries sustained from accidental gunshot.
- Manny Guerra, 85, American Tejano musician (Sunny and the Sunglows) and record producer, cancer.
- Stepan Hiha, 66, Ukrainian composer and singer.
- Marita Lange, 82, German shot putter, Olympic silver medalist (1968).
- Edmond Lauret, 76, French politician, senator (1995–2001).
- Barry Martin, 82, British artist.
- Marilyn Mazur, 70, American-born Danish percussionist.
- Sergio Miceli, 80, Brazilian sociologist.
- Leonard Morse, 96, American physician and public health official.
- Paul de Nooijer, 82, Dutch photographer and filmmaker.
- Chelliah Paramalingam, 90, Malaysian Olympic field hockey player (1964).
- Shivraj Patil, 90, Indian politician, minister of home affairs (2004–2008), member (1980–2010) and speaker of the Lok Sabha (1991–1996).
- Bolesław Rakoczy, 82, Polish historian, member of the Order of Saint Paul the First Hermit.
- Anatoly Shevtsov, 92, Russian politician, deputy (1990–1993).
- Philip D. Shutler, 99, American marine lieutenant general.
- Helge Skoog, 87, Swedish actor (T. Sventon praktiserande privatdetektiv, Halv åtta hos mig) and comedian (Parlamentet), normal pressure hydrocephalus .
- Greg Thayer, 76, American baseball player (Minnesota Twins).
- Jayne Trcka, 62, American bodybuilder, fitness model and actress (Scary Movie).
- Magda Umer, 76, Polish singer and author.
- Gennady Ustyugov, 89, Russian painter.
- Franco Vaccari, 89, Italian artist and photographer.
- Paul Wiggin, 91, American Hall of Fame football player (Cleveland Browns, Stanford Cardinal), coach (Stanford Cardinal) and executive, NFL champion (1964).

=== 13 ===
- Héctor Alterio, 96, Argentine actor (The Official Story, Flesh and Blood, Son of the Bride).
- Jose Bantolo, 65, Filipino Roman Catholic prelate, bishop of Masbate (since 2011).
- Bruno Baveni, 85, Italian football player (Genoa, Savona, AC Trento) and manager.
- Richard Bell, 88, American football coach (South Carolina Gamecocks).
- Mary Salifu Boforo, 74, Ghanaian politician, MP (1996–2017).
- Anda-Louise Bogza, 60, Romanian opera singer.
- Haroldo Costa, 95, Brazilian actor (A Moreninha, Kananga do Japão, Você Decide).
- Tonny Eyk, 85, Dutch composer, arranger and pianist.
- Ernesto Figueiredo, 88, Portuguese footballer (Sporting CP, Vitória de Setúbal, national team).
- Yves Fréville, 91, French politician, senator (2002–2008).
- Cyrus Jirongo, 64, Kenyan politician, MP (1997–2002, 2007–2013), traffic collision.
- Vladimír Matejička, 69, Slovak politician, MP (2006–2020).
- Ryan McDonough, 46, American cardiologist and member of the Alaska State Medical Board, suicide by firearm.
- Alf Meakin, 87, British Olympic sprinter (1964) and rugby league player (Blackpool Borough).
- Penelope Moreton, 93, Irish Olympic equestrian.
- Filipp Naumenko, 39, Russian politician, mayor of Reutov (since 2023), traffic collision.
- Ian Neale, 71, British Olympic gymnast (1976).
- Kerry O'Brien, 79, Australian Olympic long-distance runner (1968, 1972).
- Levon Oganezov, 84, Russian musician, composer and actor.
- Abraham Quintanilla, 86, American musician and talent manager (Selena).
- Kazi Fazlur Rahman, 93, Bangladeshi civil servant, minister of fisheries and livestock (1990–1991).
- Harry Roberts, 89, English convicted murderer (Shepherd's Bush murders).
- Bobby Rousseau, 85, Canadian ice hockey player (Montreal Canadiens, New York Rangers, national team), four-time Stanley Cup champion, Olympic silver medalist (1960).
- Gary Rowell, 68, English footballer (Sunderland, Middlesbrough, Burnley) and newspaper columnist, leukaemia.
- Ra'ad Sa'ad, 53, Palestinian commander (Al-Qassam Brigades), airstrike.
- Robert J. Samuelson, 79, American journalist (The Washington Post, Newsweek).
- Ivan R. Schwab, 77, American ophthalmologist, heart failure.
- Al Ousseynou Sène, Senegalese footballer (ASC HLM, national team).
- Mohammad Shafiq, 91, Pakistani army general, governor of Khyber Pakhtunkhwa (1999–2000).
- Mohammad Shahcheraghi, 91, Iranian ayatollah, member of the Assembly of Experts (2007–2024).
- Ghassan Skaff, Lebanese politician and neurosurgeon, MP (since 2022), politician.
- Garry Smith, 84, New Zealand rugby league player (West Coast, Wellington, national team).
- Gregory So, 67, Hong Kong politician, secretary for Commerce and Economic Development (2011–2017).
- Dave Ward, 86, American broadcast journalist (KTRK-TV).
- Sir Gerald Watt, 86, Antiguan politician, MP (1971–1976) and speaker of the House of Representatives (2014–2024).
- Juan José Zerboni, 72, Mexican actor (Dra. Lucía, un don extraordinario).

=== 14 ===
- Ahmed Abodehman, 76, Saudi writer and journalist (Al Riyadh).
- Riyad Naasan Agha, 78, Syrian philosopher and diplomat, minister of culture (2006–2010).
- Max Cunningham, 89, Australian Olympic rower (1960).
- Gerald Donaldson, 87, Canadian racing journalist.
- Garrett Ford Sr., 80, American football player (Denver Broncos).
- Paul Gagné, 63, Canadian ice hockey player (Colorado Rockies, Toronto Maple Leafs) and coach (Timmins Rock).
- Anthony Geary, 78, American actor (General Hospital, UHF, Teacher's Pet), complications from surgery.
- Roy Gearry, 78, New Zealand cricketer.
- Eva Giberti, 96, Argentine psychologist and academic.
- Prafulla Govinda Baruah, 93, Indian journalist, editor (since 1966) and owner (since 1977) of The Assam Tribune.
- Solomon Grundy, 64, American professional wrestler (WCCW, CMLL, AAA), heart attack.
- Jozef Gruska, 92, Slovak computer scientist and academic.
- Bob Hannah, 93, American college baseball coach (Delaware Fightin' Blue Hens).
- Nicholas Hum, 32, Australian long jumper, Paralympic bronze medallist (2020).
- Ryō Ishihara, 94, Japanese voice actor and narrator, heart failure.
- Roger Laboureur, 90, Belgian sports journalist (RTBF).
- Dame Shân Legge-Bourke, 82, Welsh landowner and royal lady-in-waiting, Lord Lieutenant of Powys (1998–2018).
- Timothy Light, 87, American sinologist.
- Zulfiqar Ahmad Naqshbandi, 72, Pakistani Islamic scholar.
- Brenda Lucas Ogdon, 90, English concert pianist.
- Ángel Paz, 93, Spanish footballer (Real Sociedad, Real Murcia).
- Michele Singer Reiner, 70, American photographer and film producer (Albert Brooks: Defending My Life, Shock and Awe), stabbed.
- Rob Reiner, 78, American actor (All in the Family) and film director (This Is Spinal Tap, When Harry Met Sally...), Emmy winner (1974, 1978), stabbed.
- Shamanuru Shivashankarappa, 94, Indian politician, MP (1998–1999) and Karnataka MLA (since 2004), multiple organ failure.
- Kōichi Sueyoshi, 91, Japanese politician, mayor of Kitakyushu (1987–2007).
- Amod Prasad Upadhyay, 89, Nepali politician, MP (1991–2005, 2007–2012).
- Mike White, 89, American football coach (California Golden Bears, Illinois Fighting Illini, Oakland Raiders).
- Yang Hsien, 75, Taiwanese folk singer, complications from a stroke.

=== 15 ===
- Jack Abendschan, 82, American football player (Saskatchewan Roughriders).
- John Antrobus, 92, British playwright and screenwriter (The Goon Show).
- Zarifou Ayéva, 83, Togolese politician, minister of foreign affairs (2005–2007).
- William J. Bauer, 99, American jurist, judge of the U.S. District Court for Northern Illinois (1971–1975) and judge (since 1974) and chief judge (1986–1993) of the U.S. Court of Appeals for the Seventh Circuit.
- Ali Aref Bourhan, 91, Djiboutian politician, head of state (1967–1976).
- Ettore Bucciero, 87, Italian politician, senator (1994–2006).
- Mike Campbell, 61, American baseball player (Seattle Mariners, San Diego Padres, Chicago Cubs), heart attack.
- Roderick Chase, 58, Barbadian Olympic cyclist (1988).
- Frank C. Cooksey, 92, American politician and activist, mayor of Austin, Texas (1985–1988), complications from a fall.
- Somachandra de Silva, 83, Sri Lankan cricketer (national team).
- Max Eider, 66, British guitarist (The Jazz Butcher) and songwriter, suicide.
- Joe Ely, 78, American musician (The Flatlanders), complications from Lewy body dementia, Parkinson's disease and pneumonia.
- Ángel González-Adrio, 94, Spanish basketball player (Picadero JC, RCD Espanyol).
- Josef Horešovský, 79, Czech ice hockey player and coach, Olympic silver (1968) and bronze (1972) medalist.
- Kim Mi-sub, 52, South Korean Olympic modern pentathlete (1996).
- Komafudō Daisuke, 60, Japanese sumo wrestler, heart failure.
- Viktor Kotsemyr, 73, Ukrainian politician, governor of Vinnytsia Oblast (2002–2004), governor of Khmelnytskyi Oblast (2004–2005).
- Rudy Kuechenberg, 82, American football player (Chicago Bears, Cleveland Browns, Green Bay Packers).
- Thomas Johannes Mayer, 56, German operatic baritone (Hamburg State Opera, Munich State Opera).
- Lane Rogers, 31, American pornographic actor, traffic collision.
- Anna Rusticano, 71, Italian singer, pneumonia.
- Peter Ryan, 81, British-born Australian police officer, commissioner of New South Wales police (1996–2002).
- Therrell C. Smith, 108, American ballet dancer.
- Steve Taneyhill, 52, American football player (South Carolina Gamecocks).
- Ram Vilas Vedanti, 67, Indian politician and Hindu religious leader, MP (1996–1999).
- Mandus Verlinden, 88, Belgian politician, MFP (1991–1999), senator (1991–1995).
- Kowit Wattana, 78, Thai police officer and politician, twice deputy prime minister, minister of interior (2008), and commissioner general of the Royal Thai Police (2004–2007).

=== 16 ===
- Yitzchak Abadi, 92, Venezuelan-born American Orthodox rabbi.
- Lewis Berman, 90, American veterinarian.
- Richard Browning, 73, American politician, member of the West Virginia House of Delegates (2000–2008) and Senate (2008–2012).
- Michael J. Byron, 84, American general.
- Lusanda Dumke, 29, South African rugby union player (national team), stomach cancer.
- Édika, 84, Egyptian-born French comics artist.
- Gil Gerard, 82, American actor (Buck Rogers in the 25th Century, Airport '77, The Doctors), cancer.
- Vítor Gonçalves, 81, Portuguese footballer (Sporting CP, national team).
- Albert Hall, 67, American baseball player (Atlanta Braves, Pittsburgh Pirates).
- Michael LeBlanc, 63, American football player (New England Patriots, Winnipeg Blue Bombers).
- Nuno Loureiro, 47, Portuguese plasma physicist, shot.
- Alan Marley, 74, New Zealand footballer (New Brighton, Brisbane City, national team).
- Ethan McLeod, 21, English footballer (Stourbridge, Macclesfield), traffic collision.
- Henry Moore, 102, English Anglican cleric, bishop of Cyprus and the Gulf (1981–1986).
- Chuck Neinas, 93, American athletics administrator, commissioner of the Big Eight Conference (1971–1980).
- Norman Podhoretz, 95, American magazine editor and writer, editor-in-chief of Commentary (1960–1995), pneumonia.
- Antony Price, 80, English fashion designer.
- Marcel de Sade, 91, Danish imposter and convicted embezzler, subject of The Reluctant Sadist.
- Abdel Gadir Salim, 79, Sudanese singer and bandleader.
- Anatoly Sergeyev, 85, Russian military officer, commander of the Volga–Ural Military District (1991–1992) and the Volga Military District (1992–2001).
- David Stokes, 79, Guatemalan footballer (national team, 1968 Olympics).
- Tanko Muhammad, 71, Nigerian jurist, chief justice (2019–2022) and justice of the supreme court (2007–2022).
- Maria Trayner, 89, Spanish activist.
- Jefferson Utanes, 46, Filipino voice actor, kidney disease.
- Chris Wallace-Crabbe, 91, Australian poet (The Amorous Cannibal) and academic.
- Manzoor Wattoo, 86, Pakistani politician, chief minister of Punjab (1993–1996) and minister of industry and production (2008–2013).
- Bob Wong, 84, Canadian politician, Ontario MPP (1987–1990), minister of energy (1987–1989) and citizenship (1989–1990).

=== 17 ===
- Oscar Allain, 103, Peruvian painter.
- Kevin Arkadie, 68, American television writer and producer (New York Undercover, Chicago Hope, The Shield).
- Peter Arnett, 91, New Zealand-born American journalist (Associated Press), Pulitzer Prize winner (1966), prostate cancer.
- Ismail Ayob, 83, South African anti-apartheid lawyer.
- Elías Barreiro, 95, Cuban guitarist and academic.
- Ruth Bourne, 99, British codebreaker and World War II veteran.
- Sir Humphrey Burton, 94, British television (Aquarius) and radio presenter.
- Elof Axel Carlson, 94, American geneticist.
- Juli Erickson, 86, American actress (Fullmetal Alchemist, Fairy Tail, Bernie).
- Victor Grossman, 97, American publicist and author.
- Robert Heide, 91, American playwright and author.
- Mohamed Khadhar Ibrahim, 69, Kenyan jurist, justice of the supreme court (since 2012).
- Dmitry Kachin, 96, Russian politician, member of the Soviet of the Union (1974–1989).
- Theo Kelchtermans, 82, Belgian politician, senator (1991–1995, 1999–2003).
- Verena Keller, 83, German operatic mezzosoprano.
- Bushi Kozu, 98, Japanese politician, mayor of Saku City (1977–1989).
- Liu Minfu, 87, Chinese politician.
- Günter Lyhs, 91, German gymnast, Olympic bronze medalist (1964).
- Hans van Manen, 93, Dutch ballet dancer, choreographer and photographer.
- Richard Meier, 55, British poet, lung cancer.
- Eduardo Mendieta, 61, Colombian philosopher and academic.
- Miss Janeth, 52, Mexican professional wrestler (AAA, UWA).
- Barry Mitchell, 60, American basketball player (Youngstown Pride, Quad City Thunder), heart attack.
- Sarath Chandrasiri Muthukumarana, 72, Sri Lankan politician, MP (2010–2020, 2024).
- Eugenio Perico, 74, Italian football player (Atalanta, Spezia, Ascoli) and manager.
- Mario Pineida, 33, Ecuadorian footballer (Barcelona SC, Fluminense, national team), shot.
- Vivian Polania, 37, Colombian lawyer and social media influencer.
- Rosa von Praunheim, 83, German filmmaker (The Bed Sausage, Army of Lovers or Revolt of the Perverts, It Is Not the Homosexual Who Is Perverse, But the Society in Which He Lives) and gay rights activist.
- Anatoliy Romanenko, 97, Ukrainian politician, minister of health of the Ukrainian SSR (1975–1989).
- William Rush, 31, British actor (Waterloo Road, Grange Hill, Coronation Street).
- Eddie Sotto, 67, American experiential designer, mixed-media producer and conceptualist (Walt Disney Imagineering).
- Alexandra Wedgwood, 87, British architectural historian.

=== 18 ===
- Rochelle Abramson, American violinist.
- Marsha Aizumi, 78, American author.
- Slavko Aleksić, 69, Bosnian Serb paramilitary army commander (Chetniks).
- Greg Biffle, 55, American racing driver (NASCAR, ARCA Menards Series West), plane crash.
- František Bočko, 84, Slovak Olympic gymnast (1968).
- Rodrigo Borja Cevallos, 90, Ecuadorian politician, president (1988–1992).
- Mircea Coșea, 83, Romanian politician, deputy (1996–2001) and MEP (2007–2009).
- Michele Dancelli, 83, Italian road racing cyclist.
- Richard Dimitri, 83, American actor (When Things Were Rotten, Johnny Dangerously, The World's Greatest Lover).
- Fernando da Piedade Dias dos Santos, 75, Angolan politician, prime minister (2002–2008), vice president (2010–2012) and twice president of the National Assembly.
- Alfred Esmatges, 93, Spanish racing cyclist.
- Roger Ewing, 83, American actor (Gunsmoke, None but the Brave, Play It as It Lays).
- Robert Goodman, 72, British child psychiatrist, dementia.
- Osman Hadi, 32, Bangladeshi politician and activist, injuries sustained from gunshot.
- Åge Hareide, 72, Norwegian football player (Manchester City, national team) and coach (Denmark national team), brain cancer.
- Alan Harper, 68, American politician, member of the Alabama House of Representatives (2006–2018).
- Jim Hunt, 88, American politician, governor (1977–1985, 1993–2001) and lieutenant governor of North Carolina (1973–1977).
- Toranosuke Katayama, 90, Japanese politician, MP (1989–2007, 2010–2022), minister for internal affairs and communications (2000–2003).
- Peter Kupferschmidt, 83, German footballer (Bayern Munich, Sturm Graz, Kapfenberger SV).
- Aubrey Levin, 87, South African-born Canadian psychiatrist.
- Bethanne McCarthy Patrick, 55, American politician, member of the New Jersey General Assembly (2022–2024).
- Rita Mensah-Amendah, 85, Togolese teacher and writer.
- Stanislav Moskvin, 86, Russian cyclist, Olympic bronze medalist (1960) and cycling coach.
- Héctor Luis Lucas Peña Gómez, 96, Cuban Roman Catholic prelate, auxiliary bishop of Santiago de Cuba (1970–1979) and bishop of Holguín (1979–2005).
- Máirín Quill, 89, Irish politician, TD (1987–1997) and senator (1997–2002).
- René Racine, 86, Canadian astronomer and academic.
- Boyan Radev, 83, Bulgarian wrestler, Olympic champion (1964, 1968).
- Arnulf Rainer, 96, Austrian painter.
- David Roberts, 81, English novelist.
- Terry O'Malley Seidler, 92, American businesswoman, owner of the Los Angeles Dodgers (1979–1997).
- Wilma M. Sherrill, 86, American politician, member of the North Carolina House of Representatives (1995–2007).
- Helen Siff, 88, American actress (You Don't Mess with the Zohan, Hail, Caesar!, Big Top Pee-wee), complications from surgery.
- Ram V. Sutar, 100, Indian sculptor (Statue of Unity).
- Miroslav Vondřička, 92, Czech basketball coach (women's national team).
- Frank A. Walls, 58, American convicted serial killer, execution by lethal injection.

=== 19 ===
- Mick Abrahams, 82, English guitarist and singer (Jethro Tull, Blodwyn Pig).
- Arthur Arntzen, 88, Norwegian humorist and actor.
- Richard Barnes, 81, British singer and actor (Count Dracula, Doctor Who, The Winds of War).
- Roland Bock, 81, German Olympic wrestler (1968).
- Natalya Boyarskaya, 79, Russian violinist.
- Amanda Brotchie, 57, Australian film and television director (Doctor Who, Renegade Nell, Gentleman Jack), cancer.
- Cathy Cabral, 63, Filipino civil engineer and government official.
- Lou Cannon, 92, American journalist (The Washington Post) and presidential biographer (Ronald Reagan).
- Lorraine Cheshire, 65, English actress (Trollied, Ackley Bridge, The Imaginarium of Doctor Parnassus).
- Janine O'Leary Cobb, 92, Canadian women's health activist.
- Dooz Kawa, 45, French rapper.
- Cosimo Filane, 86, Canadian singer.
- Richard Flynn, 92, Irish Olympic sport shooter.
- Terence M. Green, 78, Canadian science fiction writer.
- Benedict Gross, 75, American mathematician.
- Harald Grytten, 87, Norwegian historian.
- Andy Kosco, 84, American baseball player (Minnesota Twins, Los Angeles Dodgers, Cincinnati Reds).
- Maciej Łasicki, 60, Polish Olympic rower (1992).
- Robert Lindsey, 90, American author (The Falcon and the Snowman, An American Life).
- Cynthia Mailman, 82, American painter, pancreatic cancer.
- Mikhail Malyshev, 60, Russian convicted murderer and cannibal.
- Akira Mitsutake, 94, Japanese politician, MP (1990–1993).
- Robert Mnuchin, 92, American art dealer and banker.
- Peter Nwaoboshi, 67, Nigerian politician, senator (2015–2023).
- Konrad Osterwalder, 83, Swiss mathematician and physicist (Osterwalder–Schrader theorem).
- Darrell Pritchett, 78, American special effects artist (The Walking Dead, Die Hard, The Green Mile).
- Palpu Pushpangadan, 81, Indian botanist.
- Tatiana Radziwill, 86, French-Polish princess, bacteriologist and nurse.
- James Ransone, 46, American actor (The Wire, It Chapter Two, The Black Phone), suicide by hanging.
- Oscar da Costa Ribeiro, 89, Brazilian politician, Mato Grosso MLA (1975–1987).
- Annie Salager, 91, French poet.
- Lothar Stäber, 89, German Olympic cyclist.
- Henrik Tallberg, 83, Finnish Olympic sailor (1964, 1968).

=== 20 ===
- Romeo Acop, 78, Filipino police officer and politician, representative (2010–2019, since 2022), heart attack.
- Celso Bugallo, 78, Spanish actor (Mondays in the Sun, The Sea Inside, Salvador).
- Lindomar Castilho, 85, Brazilian singer.
- Ronald Chase, 91, American artist, photographer and film director.
- Bayard D. Clarkson, 99, American physician, hematologist and oncologist.
- Jean-Michel Couve, 85, French cardiologist and politician, deputy (1986–2017) and mayor of Saint-Tropez (1983–1989, 1993–2008).
- George Cowden, 94, American politician, member of the Texas House of Representatives (1963–1967) and chairman of the Public Utility Commission of Texas (1978–1982).
- Steve Ford, 66, English footballer (Stoke City).
- Katina, c. 50, Icelandic captive orca (SeaWorld Orlando).
- A. K. Khandker, 95, Bangladeshi air force officer and politician, chief of air staff (1972–1975), minister of finance (1987–1990) and twice MP.
- Charles F. G. Kuyk, 99, American Air Force general.
- Jean Laudet, 95, French sprint canoeist, Olympic champion (1952).
- Mohamed Lekkak, 88, Algerian football player (FC Rouen, Lyon, national team) and manager. (death announced on this date)
- Anatoly Lobotsky, 66, Russian actor (The Envy of Gods, Mata Hari, AK-47), lung cancer.
- Gerard Lynch, 94, Irish politician.
- Rich McGeorge, 77, American Hall of Fame football player (Green Bay Packers) and coach (Birmingham Stallions, Miami Dolphins).
- Zbigniew Mikołajów, 72, Polish footballer (Zagłębie Sosnowiec, national team).
- Seiichi Motohashi, 85, Japanese photographer and film director.
- Shalini Patil, 94, Indian politician, MP (1984–1989) and Maharashtra MLA (1999–2009).
- Mama Qadeer, 85, Pakistani human rights activist.
- Ike Schab, 105, American Navy sailor, survivor of the attack on Pearl Harbor.
- Sreenivasan, 69, Indian film actor, director (Vadakkunokkiyantram, Chinthavishtayaya Shyamala), and screenwriter (Odaruthammava Aalariyam).
- Michał Urbaniak, 82, Polish jazz musician.

=== 21 ===
- Sigmund Abeles, 91, American artist.
- Asanali Ashimov, 88, Kazakh actor (The Throw, or Everything Started on Saturday), film director and screenwriter.
- Rob Burgess, 68, Canadian software executive (Alias Research, Macromedia).
- Aggrey Burke, 82, Jamaican-born British psychiatrist and academic.
- María Victoria Calle, 66, Colombian jurist, justice of the Constitutional Court (2009–2017).
- Loren Carpenter, 78, American animator (Toy Story, Finding Nemo) and visual effects artist (Return of the Jedi).
- Charles P. Casey, 83, American chemist.
- Renfrew Christie, 76, South African scholar and anti-apartheid activist.
- Robert A. Flaten, 91, American diplomat, ambassador to Rwanda (1990–1993).
- Colin Ford, 91, British photographic curator.
- Joel Gougeon, 82, American politician, member of the Michigan Senate (1993–2002).
- Sebastian Hertner, 34, German footballer (Erzgebirge Aue, VfB Stuttgart II, Schalke 04 II), fall.
- Rowell Huesmann, 82, American academic.
- Irfan Shafi Khokhar, 45, Pakistani politician, Punjab MPA (since 2024), heart attack.
- Anne Madden, 93, English-born Irish painter.
- Clifton McNeil, 86, American football player (Cleveland Browns, Washington Redskins, New York Giants), NFL champion (1964).
- Patricia Montandon, 96, American author and socialite.
- Peng Peiyun, 96, Chinese politician, vice chairperson of the SCNPC (1998–2003), chairperson of the Red Cross Society of China (1999–2009) and the NPFPC (1988–1998).
- Giorgio Rumignani, 86, Italian football player (Sambenedettese, Siena) and manager (Mestre).
- Claudio Segovia, 92, Argentine theatre director (Tango Argentino, Black and Blue) and designer.
- Edmilson Soares, 73, Brazilian politician, Paraíba MLA (2011–2023).
- Betty Reid Soskin, 104, American park ranger.
- Andrei Stocker, 83, Romanian footballer (Jiul Petroșani, Minerul Lupeni).
- Taisto Tähkämaa, 101, Finnish politician, MP (1970–1991), minister of defense (1977–1979) and agriculture (1979–1983).
- Stefano Vavoli, 64, Italian footballer (Jesina, Turris, Puteolana).
- Ortrun Wenkel, 83, German operatic contralto.
- Wayne F. Whittow, 92, American politician, member of the Wisconsin State Assembly (1961–1967) and Senate (1967–1976).
- Vince Zampella, 55, American video game developer (Call of Duty, Titanfall, Star Wars Jedi: Fallen Order), traffic collision.
- Justus Zeyen, 62, German pianist and accompanist.

=== 22 ===
- Adam the Woo, 51, American YouTuber, complications from cardiovascular disease.
- Norton Barnhill, 72, American basketball player (Washington State Cougars, Seattle SuperSonics, Atenas de Córdoba).
- Alan Black, 82, Scottish footballer (Norwich City, Dumbarton, Sunderland). (death announced on this date)
- Frédéric Brun, 68, French racing cyclist.
- Buddy the Beefalo, 7, American beefalo. (death announced on this date)
- John P. Connolly, 75, English businessman, cancer.
- Richard Cramb, 62, Scottish rugby union player (Harlequins, London Scottish, national team), cancer.
- Donnie Demers, 66, American musician.
- Gathie Falk, 97, Canadian painter and sculptor.
- Pat Finn, 60, American actor (The Middle, Murphy Brown, Dude, Where's My Car?), bladder cancer.
- Michael F. Flaherty Sr., 89, American politician, member of the Massachusetts House of Representatives (1967–1991).
- Jean Gainche, 93, French road bicycle racer.
- Sukumar Ranjan Ghosh, 73, Bangladeshi politician, MP (2009–2019), pneumonia.
- Jonathan Hawkins, 42, English chess grandmaster, neuroendocrine cancer.
- Rajesh Juwantha, 49, Indian politician, Uttarakhand MLA (2007–2012).
- Uwe Kockisch, 81, German actor (Our Short Life, Treffen in Travers, Ruby Red).
- Valentina Kozlovskaya, 87, Russian chess player.
- Ray Lynch, 82, American musician and songwriter ("Celestial Soda Pop"), complications from a fall.
- Tom Maentz, 91, American football player (Michigan Wolverines) and manufacturing company owner.
- Syed Shahid Mahdi, 85–86, Indian civil servant and academic.
- Tommy E. Mitchum, 76, American politician, member of the Arkansas House of Representatives (1973–1992).
- David Pinner, 85, British actor and novelist (Ritual).
- Chris Rea, 74, English singer-songwriter ("Fool (If You Think It's Over)", "Driving Home for Christmas", "The Road to Hell").
- Marc Rivière, 75, French film director (The Year of the Hare, La reine et le cardinal).
- Christian Rovsing, 89, Danish politician, MEP (1989–2004, 2007–2009).
- Mohammad-Sadegh Salehimanesh, 66, Iranian Islamic cleric and politician, governor of Qom province (2013–2015), cardiac arrest.
- Fanil Sarvarov, 56, Russian general, car bombing.
- Alan Scanlan, 94, Australian politician. Victoria MLA (1961–1979).
- Walter Schultheiß, 101, German actor (Der Eugen).
- Kazuhiro Sugita, 84, Japanese police officer, deputy chief cabinet secretary (2012–2021).
- Daniel Treier, 53, American biblical scholar and theologian.
- Howard Tucker, 103, American neurologist.
- Robin Turner, 70, English footballer (Ipswich Town, Swansea City).
- Iêda Maria Vargas, 80, Brazilian actress and beauty queen, Miss Universe 1963.

=== 23 ===
- Sylva Akrita, 97, Greek politician and political activist, MP (1974–1977, 1981–1996), deputy minister of health, welfare and social insurance (1986–1988).
- Katie Allen, 59, Australian politician, MP (2019–2022), cholangiocarcinoma.
- Hisham N. Ashkouri, 77, American architect.
- Sivert Guttorm Bakken, 27, Norwegian biathlete.
- Roy Billinton, 90, Canadian scholar.
- Anatoliy Bondarchuk, 85, Ukrainian hammer thrower, Olympic champion (1972).
- Maria Bonghi Jovino, 93–94, Italian archaeologist.
- Roberto Buitrago, 88, Colombian Olympic cyclist (1960).
- Juan Carlos Cabrera, 34, Mexican Olympic rower.
- Sathischandra Edirisinghe, 84, Sri Lankan actor (Christhu Charithaya, Dorakada Marawa, Suhada Koka).
- Dotty Fothergill, 80, American ten-pin bowler.
- Allan Gilliver, 81, English footballer (Bradford City, Brighton & Hove Albion, Lincoln City), complications from dementia.
- Gines Gonzalez, 87, French footballer (Saint-Étienne, Racing, France Olympic).
- Mohammed Ali Ahmed al-Haddad, 57–58, Libyan army general, plane crash.
- Brian Hlongwa, South African politician, Gauteng MEC (2006–2009).
- Paa Kow, Ghanaian drummer and composer.
- Donald Lehmann, 81, American economist.
- Dorothée Aimée Malenzapa, 73–74, Central African politician, activist, and professor.
- Jimmy Miller, 72, Scottish footballer (Morton, Motherwell, Queen of the South). (death announced on this date)
- Masashi Ozaki, 78, Japanese Hall of Fame professional golfer, colorectal cancer.
- Zeferino Peña Cuéllar, Mexican drug lord (Gulf Cartel), shot.
- Josef Ratzenböck, 96, Austrian politician, governor of Upper Austria (1977–1995).
- Vasil Ringov, 70, Macedonian footballer (Vardar, Partizan, Dinamo Zagreb).
- Dick Schulze, 96, American politician, member of the U.S. House of Representatives (1975–1993), heart failure.
- Vinod Kumar Shukla, 88, Indian writer.
- Robert Smellie, 95, New Zealand jurist, judge of the High Court (1990–2000).
- Orville Smidt, 83, American politician, member of the South Dakota Senate (2005–2009) and House of Representatives (1997–2005).
- Carl J. Stewart Jr., 89, American politician, member (1967–1980) and speaker (1977–1980) of the North Carolina House of Representatives.
- D. Tokijan, 62, Singaporean footballer (Jurong Town, Singapore FA, national team).
- Clyde Werner, 78, American football player (Kansas City Chiefs).

=== 24 ===
- Mohammad Bakri, 72, Palestinian film director (Jenin, Jenin) and actor (Haifa, The Lark Farm), heart disease.
- Perry Bamonte, 65, English Hall of Fame rock musician (The Cure, Love Amongst Ruin).
- Carolyn R. Dimmick, 96, American jurist, justice of the Washington Supreme Court (1981–1985), judge (since 1985) and chief judge (1994–1997) of the U.S. District Court for the Western District of Washington.
- Annette Dionne, 91, Canadian media personality, last surviving member of the Dionne quintuplets.
- Larry J. Edgell, 79, American politician, member of the West Virginia Senate (1998–2014).
- Michael J. Flynn, 91, American computer scientist (Flynn's taxonomy).
- Neil Frank, 94, American meteorologist (KHOU), director of the National Hurricane Center (1973–1987).
- Isaiah Jackson, 80, American conductor.
- Carmen A. Kasperbauer, 90, Guamanian nurse and politician, senator (1979–1983).
- Howie Klein, 77, American record label executive (Sire Records, Reprise Records) and activist, cancer.
- Vincent Lardo, 94, American novelist.
- Lynda Blackmon Lowery, 75, American civil rights activist.
- Najih al-Mamouri, 81, Iraqi novelist.
- Isabelle Marciniak, 18, Brazilian gymnast, cancer.
- Tony McKenna, 86, Irish politician, senator (1987–1993).
- Surupsingh Hirya Naik, 87, Indian politician, MP (1977–1981) and three-time Maharashtra MLA.
- Uichiro Niwa, 86, Japanese businessman and diplomat, ambassador to China (2010–2012).
- M. Ravi, 56, Singaporean human rights activist.
- Manjula Sood, 80, Indian-born British politician, lord mayor of Leicester (2008–2009).
- Ken White, 82, English muralist and illustrator.
- David Young, 89, American-British lawyer and academic, heart failure.

=== 25 ===
- Vera Alentova, 83, Russian actress (Moscow Does Not Believe in Tears, Shirli-myrli, The Envy of Gods).
- Andrew Arbuckle, 81, Scottish journalist and politician, MSP (2005–2007).
- Steve Baer, 66, American political activist.
- Ada Balcácer, 95, Dominican multimedia visual artist.
- Dado Banatao, 79, Filipino technology industry executive, neurological disorder.
- Teuda Bara, 84, Brazilian actress (O Contador de Histórias, The Clown, Meu Pedacinho de Chão).
- Nick Bolkus, 75, Australian politician, senator (1981–2005), minister for immigration and ethnic affairs (1993–1996).
- Frank Craighill, 86, American sports agent.
- Warwick Gould, 78, Australian-born British literary scholar.
- Daniel Walker Howe, 88, American historian.
- Geeske Krol-Benedictus, 94, Dutch politician and Frisian cultural advocate, member of the Provincial Council of Friesland (1979–1995).
- Ray Lamb, 80, American baseball player (Cleveland Indians, Los Angeles Dodgers).
- Francis Marmande, 80, French author, musician and journalist, cancer.
- Cláudio Mortari, 77, Brazilian basketball player (Palmeiras) and coach (national team).
- Robert Mosci, 72, American jazz musician and pianist.
- Mart-Olav Niklus, 91, Estonian politician, MP (1992–1995).
- Stu Phillips, 92, Canadian-American country singer.
- Amos Poe, 76, American film director, producer, and screenwriter (The Foreigner, Subway Riders, La commedia di Amos Poe), cancer.
- John Robertson, 72, Scottish footballer (Nottingham Forest, national team).
- David Rosen, 95, American businessman, co-founder of Sega.
- Yuriy Sadovenko, 56, Russian army officer.
- Peter Sattmann, 77, German actor (Das Rätsel der Sandbank, Fool's Mate, Making Up!) and musician.
- Shirin Yazdanbakhsh, 76, Iranian actress (Please Do Not Disturb, Life and a Day, Killer Spider), complications from a stroke.
- Miroslav Zeman, 79, Czech wrestler, Olympic bronze medalist (1968).

=== 26 ===
- Maria Sole Agnelli, 100, Italian philanthropist and politician, mayor of Campello sul Clitunno (1960–1970).
- Radu F. Alexandru, 82, Romanian playwright, prose writer and politician, senator (1996–2004, 2008–2012).
- Carlos Anderson, 65, Peruvian politician and economist, deputy (since 2021).
- Sady Baby, 71, Brazilian actor and director, traffic collision.
- Bahram Beyzai, 87, Iranian film director (Ballad of Tara, Bashu, the Little Stranger) and playwright (Memoirs of the Actor in a Supporting Role).
- Pierre Bordage, 70, French science fiction author (L'Évangile du serpent).
- Stephen Boyden, 100, British-Australian scientist and writer.
- Aldo Maria Brachetti Peretti, 93, Italian oil industry executive, chairman of Gruppo API (1977–2007).
- Don Bryant, 83, American rhythm and blues singer and songwriter ("I Can't Stand the Rain").
- Coqui Calderón, 88, Panamanian visual artist.
- Miguel Caviedes, 95, Chilean Roman Catholic prelate, bishop of Osorno (1982–1994) and of Los Ángeles (1994–2006).
- Bill Clarke, 92, Canadian politician, MP (1973–1984).
- Desiré Dubounet, 74, American alternative medicine inventor and filmmaker.
- Jim Flanigan Sr., 80, American football player (Green Bay Packers, New Orleans Saints).
- Jean-Louis Gasset, 72, French football player (Montpellier) and manager (Montpellier, Ivory Coast national team).
- Robert Gaudreau, 81, American Olympic ice hockey player (1968).
- Kristina Gjerde, 68, American ocean conservationist, pancreatic cancer.
- Bill Hagerty, 86, British journalist and newspaper editor (Sunday People, Sunday Today).
- Emma Johnston, 52, Australian marine ecologist and academic administrator, vice-chancellor of the University of Melbourne (since 2025), cancer.
- Kim Chang-son, 81, North Korean politician, deputy (since 2019).
- Jean Le Gac, 89, French painter and photographer.
- Juanan López, 91, Spanish footballer (Athletic Bilbao, Espanyol).
- Issam Makhoul, 73, Israeli politician, MK (1999–2006).
- Robert Massard, 100, French operatic baritone.
- Pate Mustajärvi, 69, Finnish musician (Popeda).
- Leonard Nolens, 78, Belgian poet and diary writer.
- Allen I. Olson, 87, American politician, governor of North Dakota (1981–1985).
- Karl Quade, 71, German volleyball player and doctor, Paralympic champion (1988).
- Serge Roy, 93, French footballer (Racing Besançon, AS Monaco, national team).
- Biswa Bandhu Sen, 72, Indian politician, member (since 2008), deputy speaker (2018–2023) and speaker (since 2023) of the Tripura Legislative Assembly, complications from a brain haemorrhage.
- Elizabeth V. Spelman, 80, American philosopher.
- Melanie Watson Bernhardt, 57, American actress (Diff'rent Strokes).

=== 27 ===
- Daoud Abdel Sayed, 79, Egyptian film director (The Kit Kat, Land of Dreams, Messages from the Sea) and screenwriter.
- Allwell Ademola, 43, Nigerian actress (Tiwa's Baggage, My Mirror), screenwriter and film director, heart attack.
- Shamshad Akhtar, 70, Pakistani economist and politician, minister of finance (2023–2024) and governor of the State Bank of Pakistan (2006–2009).
- Marco Antonio Bernal, 72, Mexican politician, Peace Commissioner for Chiapas (1995–1997), senator (1997–2000), and deputy (2006–2009, 2012–2015).
- Carlos Cardoso, 80, Portuguese football player (Vitória Setúbal, national team) and manager (Vitória Setúbal).
- Amelia del Castillo, 82, Spanish football club president (Atlético Pinto).
- Fernanda Contri, 90, Italian jurist and politician, judge (1996–2005) and vice president (2005) of the Constitutional Court.
- Kathleen Dalyell, 88, Scottish conservationist.
- Dave Downey, 84, American basketball player (Illinois Fighting Illini).
- Fanny, 46, French singer, cancer.
- Miklós Fazekas, 92, Hungarian steeplechase runner.
- Lou Gerstner, 83, American technology executive, CEO of IBM (1993–2002).
- Gary Graffman, 97, American classical pianist.
- Lee Guerette, 76, American politician, member of the New Hampshire House of Representatives (2014–2016).
- Jeffrey R. Holland, 85, American LDS Church leader, member (since 1994), acting president (2023–2025), and president (since 2025) of the Quorum of the Twelve Apostles, kidney disease.
- Meredith Hooper, 86, Australian historian and writer.
- Eta Kaize, 51, Indonesian Olympic volleyball player.
- Suad Kalesić, 71, Bosnian footballer (Sloboda Tuzla, Osijek, Radnički Niš).
- Fernando Martín, 44, Spanish footballer (Benidorm, Alcoyano, La Nucía), shipwreck.
- Colin Pickthall, 81, British politician, MP (1992–2005).
- Richard Pollak, 91, American journalist.
- Jonathan Powell, 56, British pianist and musicologist.
- Gaspar Quintana Jorquera, 89, Chilean Roman Catholic prelate, bishop of Copiapó (2001–2014).
- Robert D. Rachlin, 89, American lawyer.
- John Roberts, 101, British naval rear-admiral.
- Marcia Rodd, 87, American singer and actress (Little Murders, Shelter, Handle with Care).
- Ants Soots, 69, Estonian conductor.
- Laurence Thomas, 76, American philosopher.
- Garrick Tremain, 84, New Zealand cartoonist.
- Karl Turner, 83, American politician, complications from Parkinson's disease.
- Rafael Viteri, 73, Spanish footballer (Athletic Bilbao, Burgos).
- Latha Walpola, 91, Sri Lankan singer.
- Richard D. Young, 83, American politician, member of the Indiana Senate (1988–2014).

=== 28 ===
- Brigitte Bardot, 91, French actress (And God Created Woman, Contempt, La Vérité) and animal rights activist, cancer.
- Tony Bond, 72, English rugby union player (Broughton Park, Sale, national team). (death announced on this date)
- Gustave Botiaux, 99, French operatic tenor.
- Daniel Brélaz, 75, Swiss mathematician and politician, MP (1979–1989, 2007–2011, 2015–2022).
- Monic Cecconi-Botella, 89, French pianist, composer and academic.
- Stewart Cheifet, 87, American television host (Computer Chronicles).
- Guy Chouinard, 69, Canadian ice hockey player (Atlanta / Calgary Flames, St. Louis Blues) and coach (Québec Remparts).
- Thomas J. Fogarty, 91, American surgeon and inventor.
- Joel Habener, 88, American physician.
- Hedva Harechavi, 84, Israeli poet, cancer.
- Silvan Kindle, 89, Liechtenstein Olympic alpine skier (1960).
- S. Krishnaswamy, 87, Indian documentarist, heart disease.
- Lowell MacDonald, 84, Canadian ice hockey player (Pittsburgh Penguins, Detroit Red Wings, Los Angeles Kings).
- Dikeledi Magadzi, 75, South African politician, MP (2014–2023).
- Pablo Moret, 92, Argentine actor (Responsibility, The Bitter Stems, El Asalto).
- Hugh Morris, 62, Welsh cricketer (Glamorgan, England national team), bowel cancer.
- Maria Pellegrini, 86, Canadian operatic soprano.
- Seyyed Ali Shafiei, 85, Iranian Twelver Shia scholar, member of the Assembly of Experts (since 1991).
- Santiago Sinclair, 97, Chilean Army general and convicted criminal, member of the government junta (1988–1990) and senator (1990–1998).
- Rudi Spring, 63, German composer, pianist, and academic, stroke.
- Iulian Vladu, 64, Romanian politician, deputy (2004–2016), cancer.
- Ruth Wagner, 85, German politician, member of the Landtag of Hesse (1978–1999), Hessian minister of education, research and arts (1999–2003).
- Ed Wallace, 72, American radio personality.

=== 29 ===
- James Akins, 69, American tubist (Columbus Symphony Orchestra) and academic.
- Francisco Barrio, 75, Mexican politician, governor of Chihuahua (1992–1998), complications from cardiac surgery.
- Rhoda Billings, 88, American lawyer and justice, chief justice of the North Carolina Supreme Court (1986).
- Tony Bracegirdle, 83, British rose breeder and horticulturist.
- Pedro Camus, 70, Spanish Olympic footballer (1976).
- Tudorița Chidu, 58, Romanian middle-distance runner.
- Enrique Collar, 91, Spanish footballer (Atlético Madrid, Valencia, national team).
- Carmen de Lavallade, 94, American dancer and choreographer.
- Saber Eid, 66, Egyptian football player (Ghazl El Mahalla, national team).
- Kristaq Eksarko, 66, Albanian footballer (Partizani, national team).
- Gordon Jones, 82, English footballer (Middlesbrough, Darlington).
- Michael Lahti, 80, American politician, member of the Michigan House of Representatives (2007–2011), heart attack.
- Michael Lippman, 79, American music manager (David Bowie, George Michael, Matchbox Twenty).
- Abu Walid al-Masri, 80, Egyptian journalist (Al Jazeera) and Islamic militant (Afghan Arabs). (death announced on this date)
- John Mulrooney, 67, American comedian.
- John Palin, 91, British Olympic sport shooter (1968, 1972).
- Patrice Péron, 76, French rugby union player (Racing 92, national team).
- Michael J. Schumacher, 75, American journalist and author.
- Eddy Shah, 81, British businessman, founder of Today and The Post.
- Syed Mukhtaruddin Shah, 74–75, Pakistani Islamic scholar.
- Davide Tizzano, 57, Italian rower, Olympic champion (1988, 1996).
- Wu Feng, 74, Chinese material scientist and engineer, member of the Chinese Academy of Engineering.

=== 30 ===
- Julius Berman, 90, American rabbi and attorney.
- Mary Bradley, 83, Northern Irish politician, MLA (2003–2011).
- Thomas W. Bradshaw, 87, American politician, mayor of Raleigh, North Carolina (1971–1973).
- Joe Byrne, 72, Northern Irish politician, MLA (1998–2003, 2011–2015).
- Ben Nighthorse Campbell, 92, American politician, member of the U.S. Senate (1993–2005) and House of Representatives (1987–1993).
- Robert Caymaris, 90, French Olympic gymnast (1960).
- Raúl Corriveau, 95, Canadian Roman Catholic prelate, coadjutor bishop (1980–1984) and bishop (1984–2005) of Choluteca.
- Francisco Fernández Marugán, 79, Spanish politician and economist, acting Ombudsman (2017–2021) and deputy (1989–2011).
- Akshu Fernando, 34, Sri Lankan cricketer (Panadura Sports Club).
- Tetsuzo Fuwa, 95, Japanese politician, MP (1969–2003).
- David Heap, 76, English-born Ireland-based actor (Fair City, Botched).
- Tim Kask, 76, American editor and writer.
- Mate Meštrović, 95, Croatian-American journalist, lobbyist and politician.
- K. K. Narayanan, 77, Indian politician, Kerala MLA (2011–2016).
- Sharif Nazarov, 79, Tajik football player (Pamir) and manager (Varzob Dushanbe, national team).
- Margarete Palz, 88, German textile artist.
- Jacqueline de Ribes, 96, French fashion designer.
- Pavel Schenk, 84, Czech volleyball player, Olympic silver (1964) and bronze medalist (1968).
- Tatiana Schlossberg, 35, American journalist (The New York Times), acute myeloid leukemia.
- Richard Smallwood, 77, American gospel singer ("Total Praise"), kidney failure.
- Emilija Soklič, 107, Slovene electrical engineer.
- Monique Tepe, 39, American early childhood educator, shot.
- Spencer Tepe, 37, American dentist, shot.
- Jerry Welsh, 89, American college basketball coach (SUNY Potsdam, Iona).
- Isiah Whitlock Jr., 71, American actor (The Wire, Da 5 Bloods, Your Honor).
- Khaleda Zia, 79, Bangladeshi politician, prime minister (1991–1996, 2001–2006), first lady (1977–1981), and three-time MP.

=== 31 ===
- Godiya Akwashiki, 52, Nigerian politician, senator (since 2019).
- Billy Ray Barnes, 90, American football player (Philadelphia Eagles, Washington Redskins, Minnesota Vikings).
- Jerry Bledsoe, 84, American author (The World's Number One, Flat-Out, All-Time Great Stock Car Racing Book, Bitter Blood, Blood Games).
- Marijan Čerček, 76, Croatian footballer (Dinamo Zagreb, NK Zagreb, Yugoslavia national team).
- Nick Eddy, 81, American football player (Detroit Lions), cardiac arrest.
- Bobby Gosh, 89, American musician and singer-songwriter ("A Little Bit More").
- Peter-Lukas Graf, 96, Swiss flautist, conductor and academic.
- Francis Hallé, 87, French botanist and biologist.
- Enno Hallek, 94, Swedish artist and academic.
- Mahmudul Hasan, 89, Bangladeshi major general and politician, minister of home affairs (1986, 1989–1990) and MP (2001–2008).
- Paul Idlout, 90, Canadian Inuk Anglican bishop.
- Dean C. Jessee, 96, American historian.
- Pasha Kasanov, 72, Ukrainian football player (Nyva Vinnytsia, Metalurh Zaporizhzhia) and manager (Nyva Vinnytsia).
- Bob Keller, 88, American basketball player.
- Elizabeth Kelly, 104, English actress (EastEnders).
- Jon Korkes, 80, American actor (Oz, Catch-22, Little Murders).
- Oscar Maroni, 74, Brazilian night club owner.
- Mark McCullough, 62, American lighting designer.
- Enric Mestre, 89, Spanish ceramist and sculptor
- Gökmen Özdenak, 78, Turkish footballer (İstanbulspor, Galatasaray, national team).
- Harvey Pratt, 84, American forensic and Native American artist.
- Eric Redrobe, 81, English footballer (Southport, Hereford United).
- Yuri Sudakov, 77, Russian boxer.
- Hayden Thompson, 87, American rockabilly musician.
- Dame Gillian Wagner, 98, British writer and philanthropist, chair of Barnardo's.
- Ewa Wojtaszek, 66, Polish Olympic sprint canoeist.
- Dick Zimmer, 81, American politician, member of the U.S. House of Representatives (1991–1997).
- Jiří Zubrický, 61, Czech Olympic weightlifter (1988, 1992).
