= Fontela =

Fontela is a surname. Notable people with the surname include:

- César Silvera Fontela (born 1971), Uruguayan former professional footballer
- Moisés Fontela (1938–2025), Argentine politician
- Orides Fontela (1940–1998), Brazilian poet
- Ramón Mendoza Fontela (1927–2001), Spanish lawyer and businessman
