= Leuven (Flemish Parliament constituency) =

Belgian political subdivision

Bruges was a constituency used to elect members of the Flemish Parliament between 1995 and 2003.

== Representatives ==
| Election | MFP (Party) | MFP (Party) | MFP (Party) | MFP (Party) | MFP (Party) | MFP (Party) | MFP (Party) | MFP (Party) | MFP (Party) |
|---|---|---|---|---|---|---|---|---|---|
| 1995 | Felix Strackx (VB) | Trees Merckx-Van Goey (CVP) | Hugo Marsoul (CVP) | Bruno Tobback (PS) | Marcel Logist (PS) | Patricia Ceysens (VLD) | Mandus Verlinden (VLD) | Gerda Raskin (VU) | René Swinnen (PS) |
| 1999 | Felix Strackx (VB) | Trees Merckx-Van Goey (CVP) | Jan Laurys (CVP) | Bruno Tobback (PS) | Marcel Logist (PS) | Bob Verstraete (VLD) | André Moreau (VLD) | Jos Bex (VU) | Ann De Martelaer (Agalev) |
