= Jacques Morier-Genoud =

Swiss politician (1934–2025)

Member of the Council of States
- In office 1 December 1975 – 25 November 1979

Member of the Grand Council of Vaud
- In office 1966–1975

Personal details
- Born: 3 October 1934 Château-d'Œx, Switzerland
- Died: 10 December 2025 (aged 91)
- Party: PS
- Occupation: Lawyer

Jacques Morier-Genoud (3 October 1934 – 10 December 2025) was a Swiss politician of the Socialist Party (PS), born in Château-d'Oex in 1934.

He studied Law at the University of Lausanne and wrote a Ph.D about British Law ("Le trespass: étude de droit anglais", 1958). He gained his Law Licence in 1960 and soon after opened his own practice.

In the early 1960s, he joined the Socialist party and was one of the founder and contributor of the Swiss opinion newspaper Domaine public.

In 1966, he was elected at the Municipality of Lausanne and the year after he entered the Grand Council of Vaud where he was active for nine years.

In 1975, he was elected on the Federal Council of States, the first Socialist from his state to do so. He did one mandate.

Thereafter, he got involved in the politics of nature. He was president of the Swiss League for the Protection of Nature (Ligue suisse pour la protection de la nature) from 1985 to 1995..

In 1993 the Swiss Federal Council nominated him as the representative of Switzerland at the International Union for Conservation of Nature (IUCN), a position he kept until 2000.

Between 1990 and 1992, Jacques Morier-Genoud sat on the Council of the state of Vaud Bar Association (Conseil de l’Ordre des avocats vaudois).

In 1992, he stepped down from the Council to take a place on the Bar Association of Vaud -- where he stayed until 2001. After that he retired from professional life.

Jacques Morier-Genoud died on 10 December 2025, at the age of 91.
