= Barry Martin =

British artist (1943–2025)

- Born: 20 February 1943; Amersham, Buckinghamshire, England
- Died: 12 December 2025 (aged 82)
- Education: Goldsmith's College; St Martin's School of Art
- Movement: Kinetic art

Barry Martin (20 February 1943 – 12 December 2025) was a British artist associated with the kinetic art movement of the 1960s, in which physical movement was incorporated into art. Martin also explored ideas of movement in the activities of games: among artists whose work has explored chess, Martin was described as "perhaps the most important". His work appears in the collections of the Victoria and Albert Museum, Tate, and British Council, among others. According to the Victoria and Albert Museum:

[Martin] has worked in various media - including kinetic sculpture, film, performance, and the making of environments - but the constant in his work has been drawing, either as a working tool, as a means of recording and observing, or as an end in itself. For Martin, drawing is a system of signs analogous to those of language, and also an intellectual process of enquiry, analysis and proposition.

Martin died on 12 December 2025, at the age of 82.
