= Rowell Huesmann =

American academic (1943–2025)

Rowell Huesmann (January 20, 1943 – December 21, 2025) was an American academic who was the Amos N. Tversky Collegiate Professor Emeritus of Communication Studies and Psychology, and Director, ISR Research Center for Group Dynamics at the University of Michigan.

Huesmann is best known for his emphasis on imitation and observational learning as primary psychological mechanisms promoting the development of aggressive and violent behavior and promoting the contagion of violence. His several longitudinal studies conducted with Leonard Eron and Eric Dubow have shown that more aggressive children grow up to be more aggressive adults and that exposure to violence as a child (including exposure to neighborhood, war, or media violence) is a risk factor for later violent behavior. Prior to coming to Michigan Huesmann was on the faculty of the University of Illinois at Chicago (1973–1992) and Yale University (1968–1973). Huesmann received his Ph.D. from Carnegie Mellon University in 1969 and his B.S. from the University of Michigan in 1964.

Huesmann died on December 21, 2025, at the age of 82.
