= Wu Feng (engineer) =

Chinese academic and engineer (1951–2025)

- 吴锋
- Born: 12 June 1951; Beijing, China
- Died: 29 December 2025 (aged 74); Beijing, China
- Education: Taiyuan University of Technology
- Scientific career
- Fields: New energy materials
- Workplaces: Beijing Institute of Technology

Chinese name
- Simplified Chinese: 吴锋
- Traditional Chinese: 吳鋒
Transcriptions
Standard Mandarin
- Hanyu Pinyin: Wú Fēng

Wu Feng (12 June 1951 – 29 December 2025) was a Chinese engineer who was a professor at Beijing Institute of Technology, and an academician of the Chinese Academy of Engineering.

== Life and career ==
Wu was born in Beijing on 12 June 1951. During the Down to the Countryside Movement, he was a sent-down youth in Shanxi. He received his bachelor's degree and master's degree from Taiyuan University of Technology in 1978 and 1981, respectively.

He taught at Beijing Institute of Technology from 1982, where he was promoted to associate professor in 1986 and to full professor in 1991. In May 2014, he was awarded an honorary Doctor of Science degree from the University of Massachusetts Boston.

Wu died on 29 December 2025, at the age of 74.

== Honours and awards ==
- 2005 State Science and Technology Progress Award (Second Class)
- 2012 Science and Technology Progress Award of the Ho Leung Ho Lee Foundation
- 2013 State Technological Invention Award (Second Class)
- 2014 Member of the International Eurasian Academy of Sciences
- 27 November 2017 Member of the Chinese Academy of Engineering (CAE)
