= Wojciech Błasiak =

Polish politician (1952–2025)

Member of the Sejm
- In office 19 September 1993 – 20 October 1997

Personal details
- Born: Wojciech Bolesław Błasiak; 4 February 1952 Sosnowiec, Poland
- Died: 3 December 2025 (aged 73)
- Party: KPN
- Education: Karol Adamiecki Academy of Economics in Katowice
- Occupation: Sociologist

Wojciech Bolesław Błasiak (4 February 1952 – 3 December 2025) was a Polish politician. A member of the Confederation of Independent Poland, he served in the Sejm from 1993 to 1997.

Błasiak died on 3 December 2025, at the age of 73.
