= Maurizio Thermes =

Italian footballer (1939–2025)

Personal information
- Date of birth: 14 August 1939
- Place of birth: Rome, Italy
- Date of death: 3 December 2025 (aged 86)
- Place of death: Rome, Italy
- Position: Midfielder

Senior career*
Years	Team	Apps	(Gls)
1958–1959	Roma	1	(0)
1959–1960	Sambenedettese	36	(1)
1960–1961	Foggia	21	(0)
1961–1962	Modena	21	(0)
1962–1964	Cosenza	27	(0)
- * Club domestic league appearances and goals

Maurizio Thermes (14 August 1939 – 3 December 2025) was an Italian professional footballer played as a midfielder. His professional debut game for A.S. Roma in the 1958–59 season remained the only Serie A game in his career. Thermes died in Rome on 3 December 2025, at the age of 86.
