= Edmilson Soares =

Brazilian politician (1952–2025)

Member of the Legislative Assembly of Paraíba
- In office 1 February 2011 – 31 January 2023

Personal details
- Born: Edmilson de Araújo Soares; 13 September 1952 João Pessoa, Paraíba, Brazil
- Died: 21 December 2025 (aged 73) João Pessoa, Paraíba, Brazil
- Party: PTB; PSB; PATRI; PODE; Avante
- Occupation: Academic

Edmilson de Araújo Soares (13 September 1952 – 21 December 2025) was a Brazilian politician. A member of multiple political parties, he served in the Legislative Assembly of Paraíba from 2011 to 2023.

Soares died in João Pessoa on 21 December 2025, at the age of 73.
