= Alfred Esmatges =

Spanish racing cyclist (1932–2025)

Personal information
- Full name: Alfredo Esmatges Yuste
- Born: 18 December 1932 Barcelona, Spain
- Died: 18 December 2025 (aged 93) Barcelona, Spain

Cycling career
- Sport: Cycling
- Discipline: Road
- Role: Rider

Professional teams
- 1955: Individual
- 1956: Indaucho
- 1957: Mobylette Coabania
- 1958: Individual
- 1959: Peña Solera
- 1960: Kas–Boxing
- 1961: Ferrys

Major wins
- 1st stages in the Volta a Catalunya

Alfredo Esmatges Yuste (18 December 1932 – 18 December 2025) was a Spanish professional cyclist. Before turning professional, he had around 50 amateur victories.

== Background ==
Esmatges was born in Barcelona, Catalonia, on 18 December 1932. In 1961, he took part in six-day track races on velodrome around the world. After retiring in 1962, he joined the technical commission of the Catalan Cycling Federation and was a technical advisor to the Association of Organizers of Races of Spain. He was president of the Catalan Cycling Federation from 1978 to 1982.

Esmatges died in Barcelona on 18 December 2025, his 93rd birthday.

== Career ==
Esmatges debuted in the Spanish Track Championship as an independent. Later, he was part of the teams Montjuïc Cycling Club 1951, the Poblet Cyclist Penya 1952, Nicky's Peñya (1953–55), Indaucho (1956), Mobylette (1957), Penya Solera (1958–59), Kas–Boxing (1960) and Ferrys (1961). During his tenure, he managed and issued federal licenses from Catalonia and created the first cyclo-cross campaign and an intervelodrome tournament. From 1983, he had been running the Unión Ciclista Igualadina. He was also the director of the Catalan Cycling School (1984–86) and held positions within the organization of the Vuelta a España and the Volta a Catalunya. He received the gold medal of the Royal Spanish Cycling Federation.

== Major results ==
1955
1st Stage 1 Volta a Catalunya
1956
1st Stage 7 Vuelta a Levante
7th Trofeo Masferrer
1959
1st Lleida
1960
1st Stage 6 Vuelta a Levante
