= Félix Leyzour =

French politician (1932–2025)

Félix Leyzour (22 July 1932 – 8 December 2025) was a French politician. He was deputy from 1997 to 2002 and mayor of Callac from 1983 to 2008. Leyzour died on 8 December 2025, at the age of 93.
