= Lee Hae-gu =

South Korean politician (1937–2025)

- 이해구

Member of the National Assembly of South Korea
- In office 8 August 2002 – 29 May 2004
- In office 30 May 1988 – 29 May 2000

Personal details
- Born: 10 September 1937 Anseong, Korea, Japan
- Died: 10 December 2025 (aged 88)
- Party: NKP; GNP
- Education: Korea University (BA); Korea National Defense University
- Occupation: Civil servant

Lee Hae-gu (Korean: 이해구; 10 September 1937 – 10 December 2025) was a South Korean politician. A member of the New Korea Party and the Grand National Party, he served in the National Assembly from 1988 to 2000 and again from 2002 to 2004.

Lee died on 10 December 2025, at the age of 88.
