= Oscar da Costa Ribeiro =

Brazilian politician (1936–2025)

Member of the Legislative Assembly of Mato Grosso
- In office 1 February 1975 – 31 January 1987

Personal details
- Born: 11 September 1936 Santo Antônio de Leverger, Mato Grosso, Brazil
- Died: 19 December 2025 (aged 89) Cuiabá, Mato Grosso, Brazil
- Party: DEM
- Education: Federal University of Mato Grosso
- Occupation: Lawyer

Oscar da Costa Ribeiro (11 September 1936 – 19 December 2025) was a Brazilian politician. A member of the Democrats, he served in the Legislative Assembly of Mato Grosso from 1975 to 1987.

Ribeiro died in Cuiabá on 19 December 2025 at the age of 89.
