= Pedro Camus =

Spanish footballer (1955–2025)

Personal information
- Full name: Pedro Camus Pérez
- Date of birth: 13 July 1955
- Place of birth: Santander, Spain
- Date of death: 29 December 2025 (aged 70)
- Height: 1.77 m (5 ft 10 in)
- Position: Central defender

International career
Years	Team	Apps	(Gls)
- Spain

Pedro Camus Pérez (13 June 1955 – 29 December 2025) was a Spanish footballer who played as a central defender. He competed in the men's tournament at the 1976 Summer Olympics. Camus died on 29 December 2025, at the age of 70.
