= Juanan López =

Spanish footballer (1934–2025)

Personal information
- Full name: Juan Antonio López García
- Date of birth: 9 June 1934
- Place of birth: Irun, Spain
- Date of death: 26 December 2025 (aged 91)
- Place of death: Tenerife, Spain
- Position: Goalkeeper

Youth career
- Umore Ona
- Beasain

Senior career*
Years	Team	Apps	(Gls)
1956–1957	Alavés	19	(0)
1957–1962	Athletic Bilbao	11	(0)
1962–1964	Español	19	(0)
1964–1967	Recreativo Huelva	31	(0)
Total		80	(0)
- * Club domestic league appearances and goals

Juan Antonio "Juanan" López García (9 June 1934 – 26 December 2025) was a Spanish footballer who played as a goalkeeper. He played 22 La Liga games for Athletic Bilbao and Español, and 58 in the Segunda División for Alavés, Español and Recreativo de Huelva.

== Career ==
Born in Irun in Gipuzkoa, López played two seasons for Alavés in the Segunda División before joining Athletic Bilbao. Second-choice to Carmelo Cedrún, he played only 11 games over five seasons, missing out on the Copa del Generalísimo win in 1958.

López departed the San Mamés Stadium in 1962 after the club brought in José Ángel Iribar as understudy to Cedrún. He played for two years at Español, winning promotion to La Liga in his first season (although he was mainly backup to Benito Joanet), and concluded his career in 1967 after three years, all in the second tier, at Recreativo de Huelva.

== Later life and death ==
After retiring from playing football, López relocated to Tenerife, and spent nearly sixty years as an ambassador for Athletic and Basque culture on the island. His sons Gorka and Juantxo, both of whom also became goalkeepers in the lower divisions, were born in Tenerife, and Juanan died there on 26 December 2025 at the age of 91. Athletic announced that their players would wear black armbands for their next match, away to Osasuna on 3 January.
