= Ahmed Abodehman =

Saudi writer and journalist (1949–2025)

- أحمد أبودهمان
- Born: 29 April 1949; Al Khalaf, Saudi Arabia
- Died: 14 December 2025 (aged 76); Paris, France
- Education: King Saud University (BA); University of Paris (MA)
- Occupations: Writer; Journalist

Ahmed Abodehman (Arabic: أحمد أبودهمان; 29 April 1949 – 14 December 2025) was a Saudi writer and journalist.

Following his studies at King Saud University and the University of Paris, he became the first writer from the Arabian Peninsula to write in French. His 1982 novel, La Ceinture, was dedicated to his wife and daughter. As a journalist, he was a Paris correspondent for the newspaper Al Riyadh.

Abodehman died in Paris on 14 December 2024, at the age of 76.
