= Killing of Monique and Spencer Tepe =

2025 double homicide in Columbus, Ohio

- Location: Columbus, Ohio, U.S.
- Date: December 30, 2025; 10 months ago
- Deaths: 2
- Victims: Monique Tepe; Spencer Tepe
- Motive: Under investigation
- Accused: Michael David McKee
- Charges: Aggravated murder (4 counts); aggravated burglary (1 count)

On December 30, 2025, Monique Tepe, 39, and her husband, Spencer Tepe, 37, were found dead from gunshot wounds at their home in Columbus, Ohio, after Spencer failed to arrive for work and a welfare check was requested. Their two young children and the family dog were located unharmed. The investigation soon focused on Monique's ex‑husband, Michael David McKee, 39, who was arrested in Illinois on January 10, 2026, and later indicted in Franklin County on four counts of aggravated murder and one count of aggravated burglary. Criminal proceedings remain ongoing.

== Background ==
Monique Sabaturski was born on October 14, 1986, in Chicago, Illinois. Her family moved to Worthington, Ohio, when she was one year old, and she was raised there. During her youth, she participated in soccer and running and developed an interest in horses and reading. She attended Ohio State University, where she pursued a master's degree in early childhood education. Monique married Michael McKee in August 2015. They separated in March 2016, and she filed for divorce in June 2017. According to her relatives, McKee had been emotionally abusive during the marriage, and Monique was afraid of him.

Spencer Tepe was born on December 9, 1988, in Cincinnati, Ohio. He completed both his undergraduate studies and his Doctor of Dental Surgery degree at Ohio State University. He worked as a dentist in Athens, Ohio. He also had an interest in competitive activities, particularly soccer and golf, and was fluent in Spanish.

Monique and Spencer met online in 2018 and married in 2020. They had two children: a daughter born in 2022 and a son born in 2024.

== Discovery ==
On the morning of December 30, 2025, concerns arose when Spencer did not arrive for work and could not be reached. At 8:58 a.m., his employer, who was on vacation, contacted Columbus police to request a welfare check after staff reported that Spencer had not come in and that neither he nor Monique could be reached. An officer was dispatched at 9:10 a.m. and arrived at 9:15 a.m., but went to the wrong address, knocked, received no response, and left.

At 9:56 a.m., a man who had gone to the correct address called police, reporting that he could hear the couple's children inside but could not access the home. Two minutes later, at 9:58 a.m., a female coworker driving to the residence also contacted authorities to express concern. At 10:03 a.m., a 911 caller reported that someone had entered the house to check on the couple and had found Spencer unresponsive on the floor next to the bed, with blood visible at the scene. Police were dispatched again at 10:04 a.m. and found Monique, 39, and Spencer, 37, dead. Columbus Fire Department Medic 7 formally pronounced both victims dead at 10:11 a.m. No signs of forced entry were found, no firearm was recovered, and three spent 9 mm casings were collected at the scene. The couple's two young children and the family dog were found unharmed inside the home. Autopsy reports later released by the Franklin County Coroner's Office confirmed that Monique had sustained nine gunshot wounds, including one fired at close range, and that Spencer had sustained seven.

== Investigation and arrest ==
Police released surveillance footage on January 5, 2026, showing an unidentified man walking through an alley near the Tepe residence between 2 and 5 a.m., the estimated window of the killings. Police later identified Michael David McKee, 39, Monique's ex‑husband, as the man in the video. Investigators also compared the video with vehicle‑tracking data indicating a car associated with McKee arrived in the neighborhood shortly before the homicides and left soon afterward. The vehicle was later traced to Rockford, Illinois, where McKee was employed.

McKee was arrested in Illinois on January 10, 2026, at a Chick-fil-A restaurant near his workplace. At a January 14 police briefing, the Columbus police chief described the killings as a targeted, "domestic‑violence‑related attack." During a search of McKee's property, investigators recovered a firearm that they said was consistent with the weapon believed to have been used in the homicides. A Franklin County grand jury returned a multi‑count indictment on January 16, charging McKee with four counts of aggravated murder and one count of aggravated burglary. McKee was booked into the James A. Karnes Correctional Center on January 20 ahead of a scheduled court hearing on January 23, where he pleaded not guilty.

According to an affidavit, surveillance footage from December 6, 2025, captured McKee allegedly entering the area immediately surrounding the Tepe residence while Monique and Spencer were out of town. The couple had traveled to Indiana with friends for the Big Ten Championship game, and during the evening Monique returned to their hotel room earlier than the rest of the group. Spencer later told a friend that she was "upset about something involving her ex‑husband" before he went back to check on her. The affidavit states that the man seen in the footage approached the property through the rear alley and left after a period of time. It also states that McKee was not scheduled to work that day.
