= Ángel González-Adrio =

Spanish basketball player (1931–2025)

Personal information
- Born: 10 February 1931 Pontevedra, Spain
- Died: 15 December 2025 (aged 94) Barcelona, Spain
- Listed height: 1.90 m (6 ft 3 in)

Ángel González-Adrio (10 February 1931 – 15 December 2025) was a Spanish basketball player.

== Career ==
Ángel González-Adrio was born on 10 February 1931 in Pontevedra, Spain. but was moved to Argentina. Later, after returning to Spain, he played for Picadero JC and RCD Espanyol.

Adrio competed in the first world basketball championship held in Argentina in 1950.

== Personal life and death ==
González-Adrio was one of the tallest players on the Spain national football team. His nephew Rafael González-Adrio was also a famous Spanish football player that died on 21 July 2025.

González-Adrio died on 15 December 2025, at the age of 94.
