= Patrick Galan =

French journalist, photographer and historian (1950–2025)

- Born: 1950; Annecy, France
- Died: 1 December 2025 (aged 75)
- Occupations: Journalist, photographer, historian

Patrick Galan (French: [patʁik galɑ̃]; 1950 – 1 December 2025) was a French journalist, photographer, and historian.

He worked for the Rupert Murdoch media empire for 17 years in Geneva, New York City, Europe, Africa, and the Middle East. He also founded the magazine L’Esprit du Voyage and wrote tourism articles for travelers in France, Switzerland, Italy, and the Low Countries.

Galan died on 1 December 2025, at the age of 75.

== Publications ==
- Elle, Mary-Poupée, Princesse d'Amour (1999)
- Pourquoi je râle… (2001, 2002, 2005, 2010)
- Bourlingades au Kenya (2004)
- La Malédiction du Sphinx (2004)
- Règlement de comptes à Bornéo (2007)
- Les Copains de Babou (2009)
- Rififi dans les Bauges (2011)
- Opération Fraisolita (2015)
- Les Copains de Filou (2019)
- Une Sacrée journée (2019)
- D'une vision à l'autre (2020)
- Manon des Sables (2025)
