= Sady Baby =

Brazilian actor and film director (1954–2025)

- Born: Sady Plauth; 30 March 1954; Erechim, Rio Grande do Sul, Brazil
- Died: 26 December 2025 (aged 71); Indaial, Santa Catarina, Brazil
- Occupations: Actor, film director

Sady Baby (30 March 1954 – 26 December 2025) was a Brazilian actor and film director.

== Life and career ==
Sady Baby became famous in the 1980s working on Brazilian erotic films (pornochanchada). In the 2010s, with the advent of social media, his productions once again gained notoriety in the virtual environment, generating memes.

In 2013, he was arrested on charges of fraud and forgery, having made payments without sufficient funds at various establishments. He died in Indaial, Santa Catarina, Brazil on 26 December 2025, at the age of 71, after a month in a coma following a traffic collision.
