= Ramón Trujillo Carreño =

Spanish linguist (1931–2025)

Ramón Trujillo Carreño (1931 – 7 December 2025) was a Spanish linguist who specialised in semantics at the University of La Laguna. In 2002, he was given the title of profesor emérito, one of the highest academic distinctions in Spain.

== Life and career ==
Trujillo Carreño was a professor at University of La Laguna from 1967.

He died on 7 December 2025, at the age of 94.
