= Ingrid Seeler =

German politician (1929–2025)

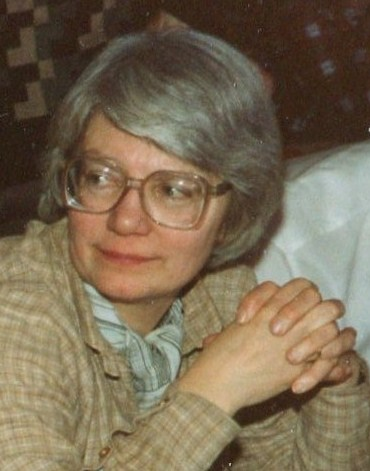
- Seeler in 1981

Member of the Hamburg Parliament
- In office 17 April 1974 – 26 November 1986

Personal details
- Born: Ingrid Burghardt; 5 October 1928 Hamburg, Germany
- Died: 10 December 2025 (aged 97)
- Party: SPD
- Occupation: Schoolteacher

Ingrid Seeler (née Burghardt; 5 October 1928 – 10 December 2025) was a German politician. A member of the Social Democratic Party, she served in the Hamburg Parliament from 1974 to 1986.

Seeler died on 10 December 2025 at the age of 97.
