= Adrian Pleșca =

Romanian singer (1961–2025)

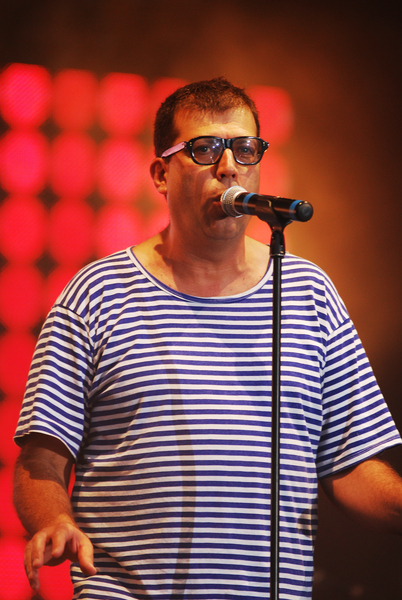
- Pleșca in 2008
- Born: 31 March 1961; Bucharest, Romania
- Died: 2 December 2025 (aged 64); Bucharest, Romania
- Occupations: Musician; Singer
- Years active: 1982–2025

Adrian Pleșca (31 March 1961 – 2 December 2025) was a Romanian singer.

== Early life and career ==
Pleșca studied violin in kindergarten, piano in grades I-VII, and double bass in grade VIII. He attended the Faculty of Metallurgy at the Polytechnic University of Bucharest and worked at the Călărași steel works.

== Controversy ==
In October 2025, Artan attempted to kiss an 18-year-old girl he did not know without her consent in a bar in Bucharest. He justified his action by saying, "I kissed her because she seemed so pensive... She was nervous." Certain sources indicated that this was not the first incident of this kind.

== Death ==
On 2 December 2025, Artan died at Pantelimon Hospital following a stroke. He was 64.

== Discography ==
=== Timpuri Noi ===
- Formații rock 11 (Electrecord, 1988, with Contrast from Suceava)
- Timpuri Noi (Cartianu SRL & Eurostar, 1992)
- Unplugged in concert (Vivo, 1994)
- De regiune superior (Vivo, 1995)
- Basca abundenței (MediaPro Music, 1998)
- Lucky Nights Unplugged (MediaPro Music, 2000, with Vița de Vie)
- Back in Business (MediaPro Music, 2006)

=== Partizan ===
- Am cu ce (Cat Music, 2002)
- București (Cat Music, 2003)
- Nori peste Sălăjan (Electrecord, 2025)
