= Suad Kalesić =

Bosnian-Herzegovinian footballer (1954–2025)

Personal information
- Date of birth: 7 July 1954
- Place of birth: Tuzla, PR Bosnia and Herzegovina, FPR Yugoslavia
- Date of death: 27 December 2025 (aged 71)
- Place of death: Tuzla, Bosnia and Herzegovina
- Position: Defender

Senior career*
| Years | Team | Apps | (Gls) |
| 1972–1976 | Sloboda Tuzla | 47 | (0) |
| 1976–1977 | Osijek | 20 | (0) |
| 1978–1979 | Radnički Niš | 19 | (0) |
| 1979–1988 | Budućnost Banovići | | |

Managerial career
- -2002: Sloboda Tuzla
- * Club domestic league appearances and goals

Suad Kalesić (7 July 1954 – 27 December 2025) was a Bosnian-Herzegovinian football who played as a defender in several clubs in Yugoslav First and Second League.

== Playing career ==
Born in Tuzla, PR Bosnia and Herzegovina back then within Yugoslavia, he started playing in local side Sloboda Tuzla playing in the Yugoslav First League between 1972 and 1976. In summer 1976 he moved to Osijek which were playing in the Yugoslav Second League but were aspiring to promotion, which they achieved at the end of the season. Kalesić then played the first half of the 1977–78 Yugoslav First League with Osijek, but at the winter break another top-league side brought him to their team, Radnički Niš. He played in Niš until summer 1979 when he moved to Budućnost Banovići playing with them until 1988 in third level.

== Managerial career ==
Kalesić was replaced by Mirza Hadzić as manager of Sloboda Tuzla in March 2002.

== Death ==
Kalesić died in Tuzla on 27 December 2025, at the age of 71.
