= Rita Mensah-Amendah =

Togolese teacher and writer (1940–2025)

- Born: 1940; Dakar, Colony of Senegal, French West Africa
- Died: 18 December 2025 (aged 85); Lomé, Togo
- Education: École normale d'instituteurs de Metz (Lic.)
- Occupations: Teacher; Writer

Rita Mensah-Amendah (1940 – 18 December 2025) was a Togolese writer and teacher.

Mensah-Amendah studied classical letters and English at the École normale d'instituteurs de Metz in France before teaching in Togo. Upon her retirement from teaching in 1996, she devoted her time to the Centre de recherche, d'information et de formation pour la femme and to campaigning against violence against women.

Mensah-Amendah died in Lomé on 18 December 2025, at the age of 85.

== Works ==
- Mosaïques africaines : chroniques féminines (2003)
- Faits divers et d'espoir (2010)
- Fleur vive (2022)
