= Jürgen Raps =

German pilot (1951–2025)

Hans Jürgen Raps
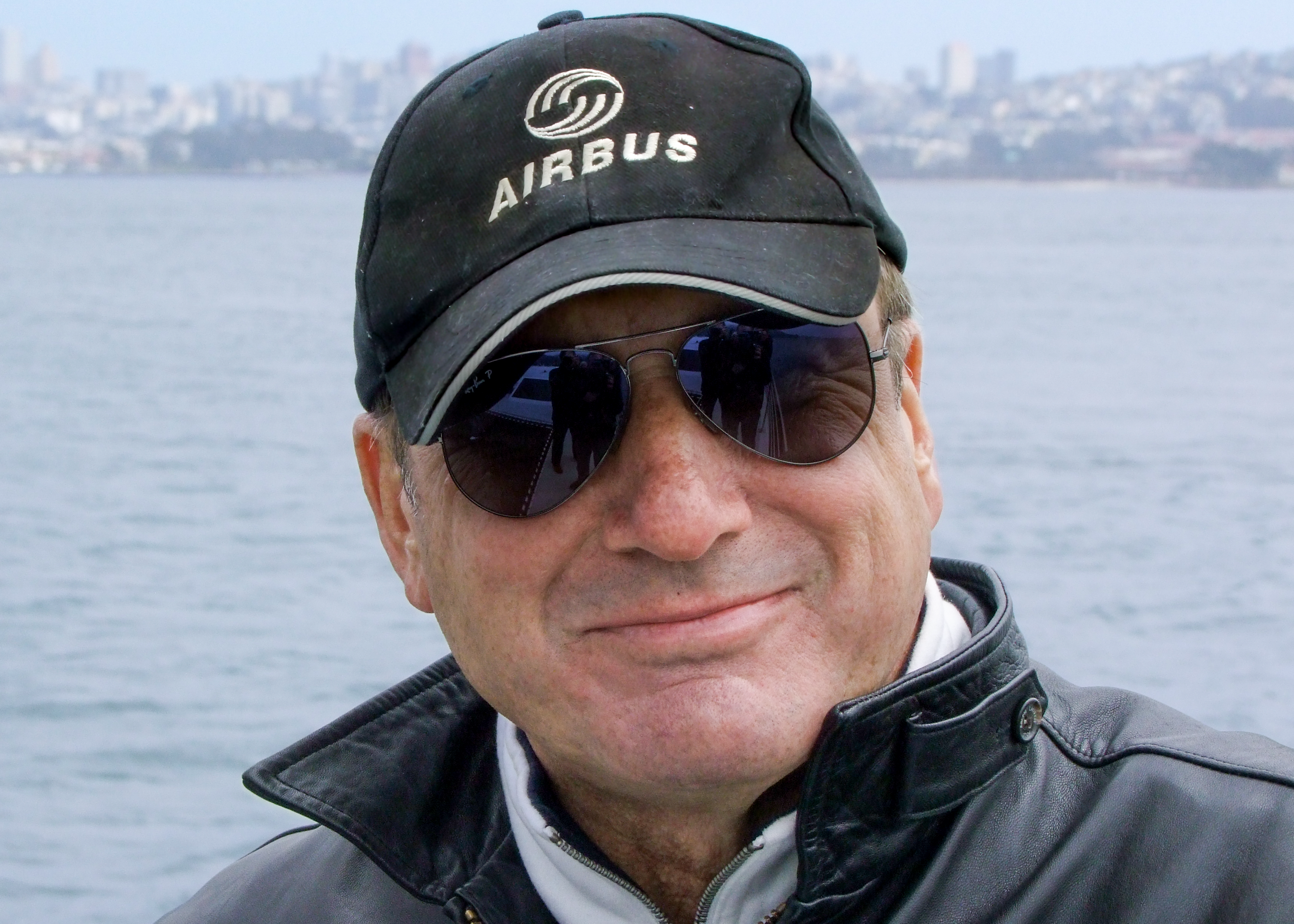
- Raps at a retirement reception on a sailing boat. (San Francisco Bay, 2012)
- Born: August 11, 1951; Bayreuth, Bavaria
- Died: November 6, 2025 (aged 74); Phoenix, Arizona
- Education: Lufthansa Aviation Acedemy, Bremen
- Years active: 1972–2012
- Employer: Lufthansa Airlines
- Television: PilotsEYE.tv
- Title: Prof. Capt. FRAeS
- Website: online-tribute.com/juergenraps

Hans Jürgen Raps (11 August 1951 – 6 December 2025) was a German pilot and aviation manager. He served as Chief Operating Officer (Operations) at Lufthansa Passenger Airlines (Lufthansa Passage), and is described in obituaries as a member of the Lufthansa Passage executive board as well as the accountable manager (AOC) and chief pilot. He was also an honorary professor at Hochschule Bremen in the fields of aviation and management.

== Life and career ==
Raps was born in Bayreuth. At the age of five, he took a sightseeing flight with his father departing from Bayreuth Airport (Verkehrslandeplatz Bayreuth), flying over Upper Franconia. At age 13, he learned gliding with the Luftsportgemeinschaft Bayreuth.

After completing secondary school, he applied to the Deutsche Lufthansa commercial pilot school in Bremen. He began training there in 1970 and obtained his pilot licence in 1972. He subsequently served as a first officer on the Boeing 737 and the McDonnell Douglas DC-10. In 1984, he became a captain on the Boeing 737.

In 1990, Raps became head of the Lufthansa commercial pilot school in Bremen. In 1996, he was appointed chief pilot and head of flight operations (Senior Vice President Flight Operations).

He was credited with leading Lufthansa's first scheduled service linking West Germany and East Germany in 1989. In 2007, he was among the first pilots worldwide to obtain a licence for the Airbus A380. In 2010, he flew an A380 transporting the German national football team to the 2010 FIFA World Cup in Johannesburg.

Additional leadership roles and dates are listed in his professional profile.

Raps died on 6 December 2025 in Phoenix, Arizona, at the age of 74.

== Activities ==
Raps served as president (industry and aviation) of the aviation initiative AIREG (Aviation Initiative for Renewable Energy in Germany). AIREG advocates the expansion and use of renewable energy and alternative aviation fuels to reduce CO₂ emissions in aviation.

== Media ==
Raps was the protagonist of the PilotsEYE.tv documentary San Francisco A380 – The final flights of JR (episode 12). He also appeared as an interviewee in the hr documentary series Mittendrin – Flughafen Frankfurt (A 380: Letzter Take-off für den Supervogel). A two-part podcast/video interview (planeTALK) was also published in the PilotsEYE environment.
