= Nadiya Sabeh =

Ivorian actress and content creator (1994-2025)

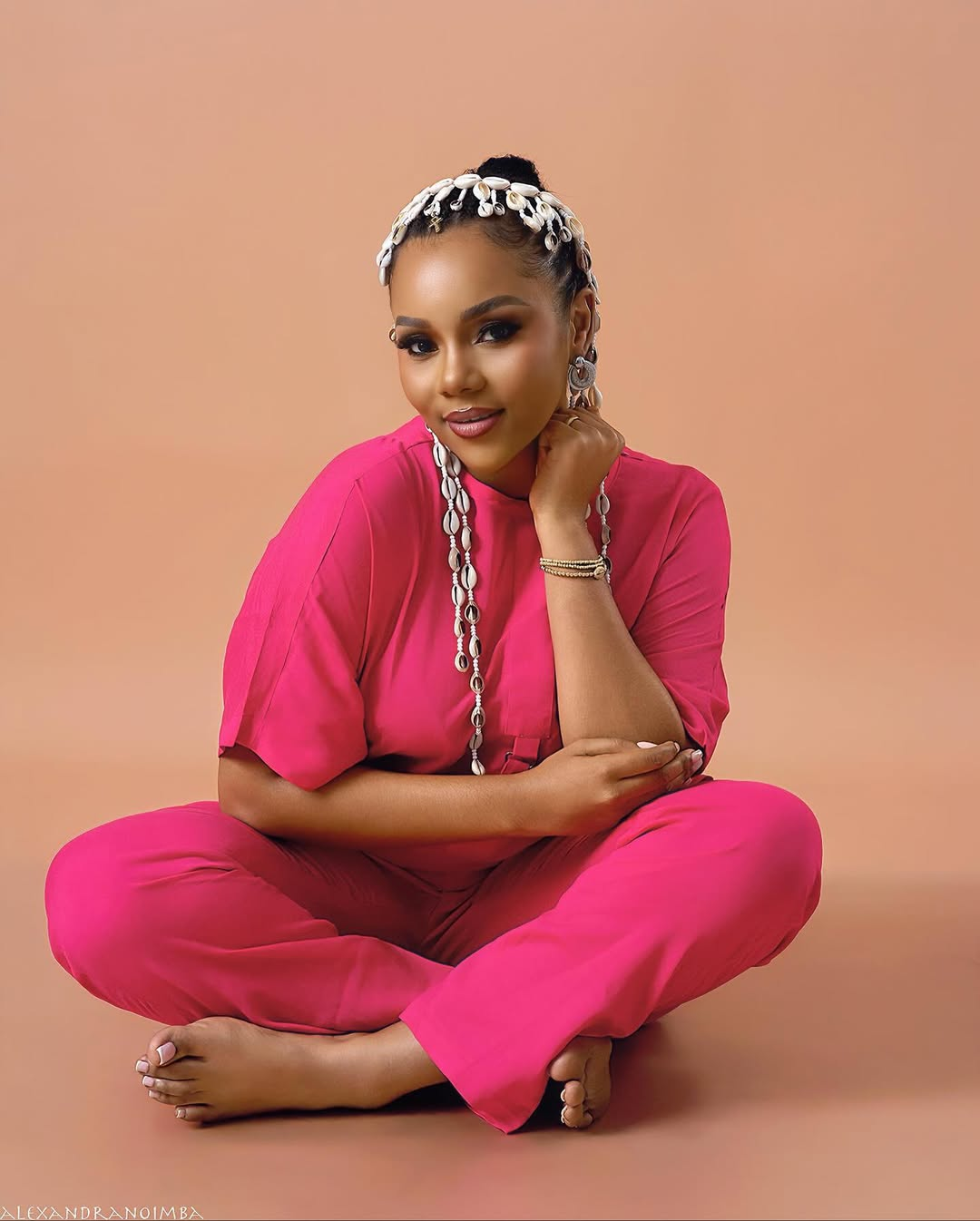
- Nadiya Sabeh in 2025
- Born: 1 November 1994
- Died: 3 December 2025 (aged 32); Abidjan, Ivory Coast
- Occupations: Actress; Content creator

Nadiya Sabeh (1 November 1994 – 3 December 2025) was an Ivorian actress and content creator.

Sabeh first gained recognition through theatrical productions before appearing on television, which garnered her a growing audience. She gained an active online presence and amassed a significant platform. In 2024, she publicly announced her diagnosis with breast cancer and published an autobiography titled Voyage au cœur de la vie later that year, which covered her personal experiences in social media and battling the disease.

Sabeh died from breast cancer in Abidjan, on 3 December 2025, at the age of 31 after a year long battle with breast cancer.
