= Iulian Vladu (politician) =

Romanian politician

Member of the Chamber of Deputies of Romania
- In office 2004–2016

Personal details
- Born: 1 April 1961 Cobia, Dâmbovița, Romania
- Died: 28 December 2025 (aged 64)
- Party: PNL

Iulian Vladu (1 April 1961 – 28 December 2025) was a Romanian politician. A member of the National Liberal Party, he served in the Chamber of Deputies of Romania from 2004 to 2016.

Vladu died on 28 December 2025 of cancer, at the age of 64.
