= Guy Pessiot =

French journalist and politician (1949–2025)

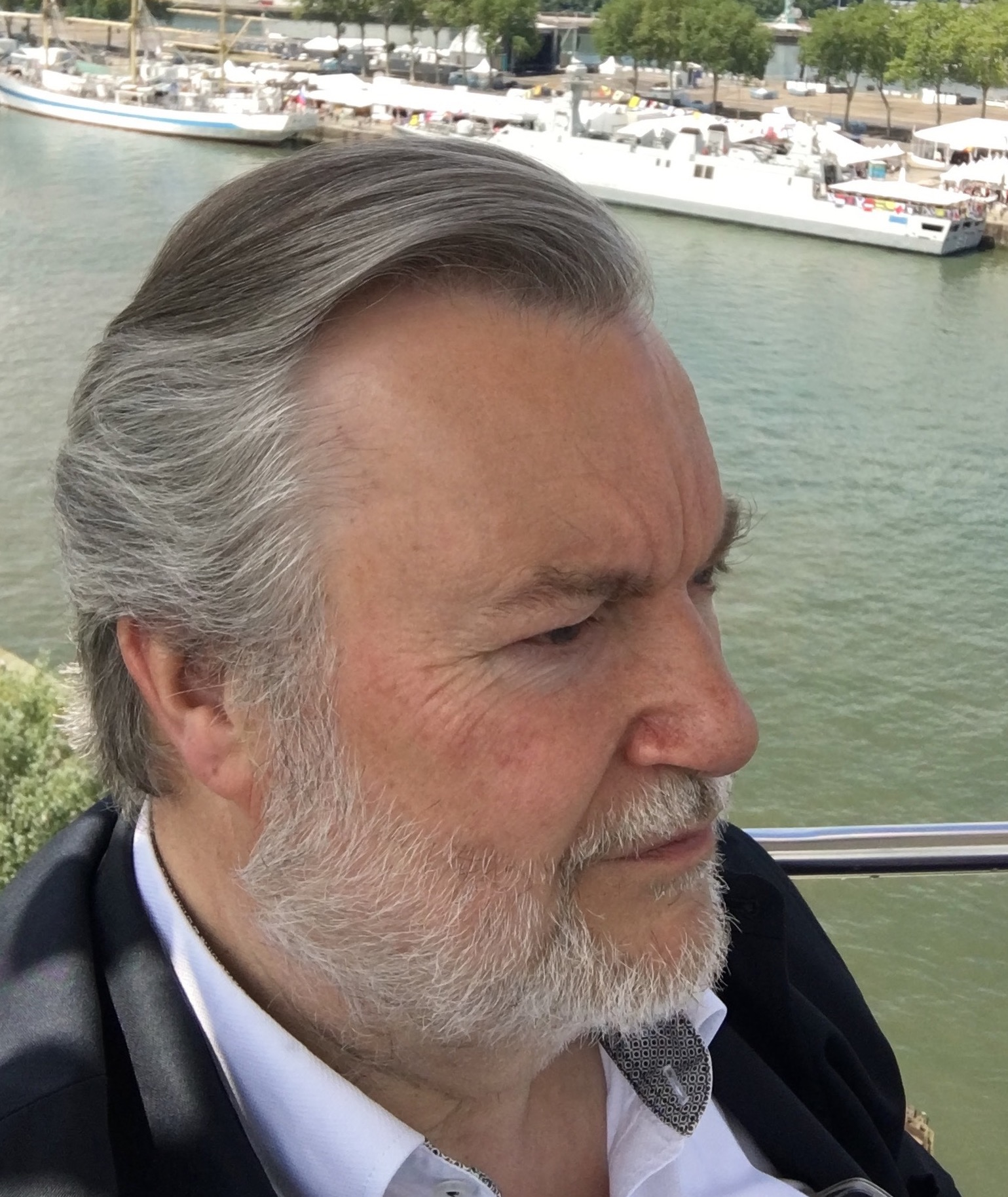
- Pessiot in 2019
- Born: Guy Pessiot; 7 May 1949; Rouen, France
- Died: 11 December 2025 (aged 76)
- Occupations: Politician; Journalist; Editor; Historian

Guy Pessiot (7 May 1949 – 11 December 2025) was a French journalist, editor, historian and local politician. He was the co–founder of Éditions Génération and the monthly magazine L'Étudiant.

== Life and career ==
Guy Pessiot was born in Rouen, France on 7 May 1949. He studied in Lycée Pierre-Corneille and then later changed to Neoma Business School.

Pessiot co-founded Éditions Génération and the monthly magazine L'Étudiant in 1971 with René Silvestre, serving as its editor-in-chief. In 1976, he created Le P'tit Normand, a practical guide to the Rouen metropolitan area and Éditions du P'tit Normand (which became PTC in 1999) in 1979. He was Michel Bussi's first publisher.

He became the city councillor for Rouen, then he was elected, in March 2008, third deputy to Valérie Fourneyron. From 2012 to 2020, he was a municipal councillor.

Pessiot was president of the Rouen Seine Valley Normandy Tourist and Convention Bureau from 2008 to 2018 and vice-president of the Tourist Offices of France from 2014 to 2018. In 2019, he was a member of the board of the Rouen Normandy metropolitan area.

Pessiot died on 11 December 2025, at the age of 76.
