= Lewis Berman =

American veterinarian (1935–2025)

Lewis Howard Berman (January 7, 1935 – December 16, 2025) was an American veterinarian. Based at the Park East Animal Hospital on the Upper East Side of New York City, which Berman founded in 1961, he was popular with celebrities. He died on December 16, 2025, at the age of 90.
