= Georg Springer =

Austrian cultural manager (1946–2025)

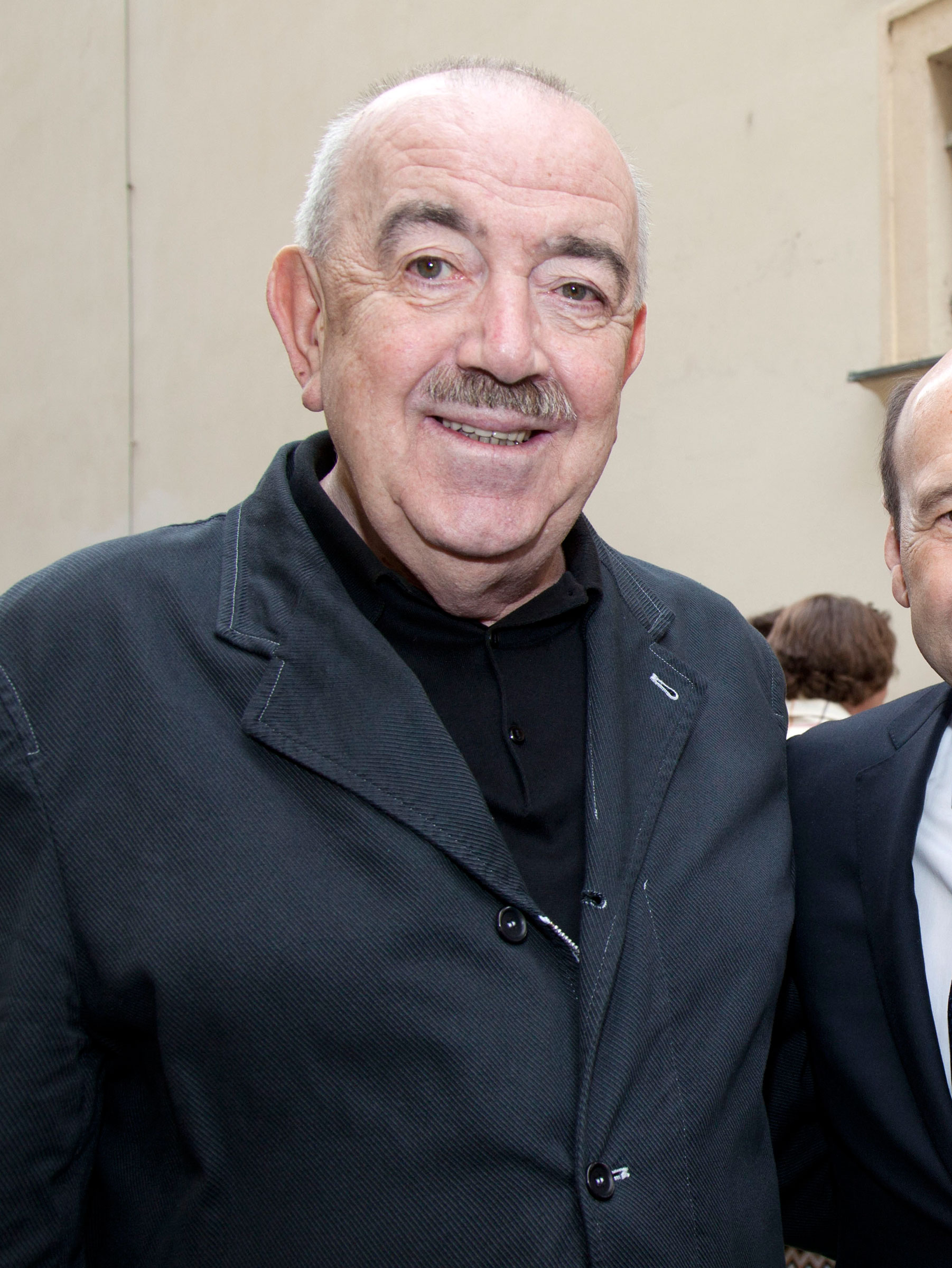
- Springer in 2015
- Born: 20 August 1946; Vienna, Allied-occupied Austria
- Died: 11 December 2025 (aged 79); Vienna, Austria
- Occupation: Cultural manager

Georg Springer (20 August 1946 – 11 December 2025) was an Austrian secretary general and later managing director of the Austrian federal theatres.

== Life and career ==
Springer was born in Vienna on 20 August 1946. He studied law in Vienna and subsequently worked as a university assistant in constitutional and administrative law in Vienna, before joining the Federal Chancellery of Austria in 1988 and holding for years the position of Deputy Secretary General of the Austrian Federal Theatres.

From 1999 to June 2014, Springer was managing director of the Federal Theatres Holding Company (Bundestheater-Holding GesmbH), a position he resigned from following the financial scandal. He has been a member of the board of trustees of the Salzburg Festival.

Springer died in Vienna on 11 December 2025, at the age of 79.
