= Dooz Kawa =

French rapper (1980–2025)

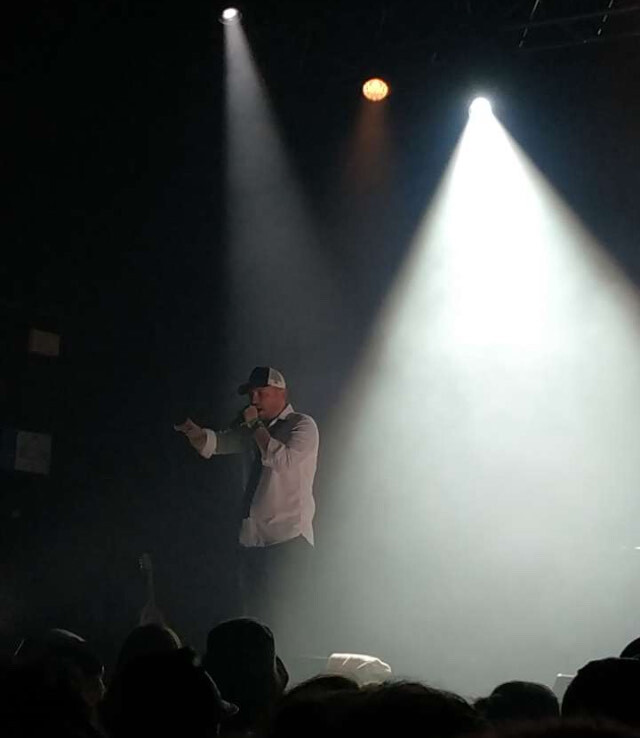
- Latreille-Ladoux performing in 2020

Background information
- Born: Franck Latreille-Ladoux; 8 January 1980; Chartres, France
- Died: 19 December 2025 (aged 45) Marsielle, France
- Genres: Rap; Hip-hop
- Occupation: Rapper

Franck Latreille-Ladoux (8 January 1980 – 19 December 2025), known professionally as Dooz Kawa, was a French rapper.

== Life and career ==
Latreille-Ladoux was born in Chartres, the son of German parents. His mother was of Czechoslovak origin. At the age of seventeen, he moved and rapped in Strasbourg. His first collaboration was with Biréli Lagrène, a jazz guitarist.

Later in his career, in 2010, Latreille-Ladoux released his first album Étoiles du Sol. In 2016, he released the track "Me Faire la Belle", which garnered over 15 million streams on Spotify. In 2019, Le Figaro named him "the pen of French rap". During the COVID-19 pandemic, he released the album Nomad's Land. His last album Vol de Nuit was released in 2024.

== Death ==
Latreille-Ladoux died on 19 December 2025 in Marseille, at the age of 45.

== Discography ==
As part of T-Kaï Cee

- 2003 : Hiver 67 (EP)
- 2004 : Bienvenue dans mon Trist'Klan (EP)
- 2005 : B'Side (Mixtape)
- 2008 : Transmission Pirate (Mixtape)

As part of Soleil Noir

- 2022 : Jour de Nuit (Album)

Solo

- 2010 : Étoiles du Sol (Album)
- 2012 : Message aux Anges Noirs (Album)
- 2013 : Narcozik #1 (EP)
- 2014 : Narcozik #2 (EP)
- 2016 : Bohemian Rap Story (Album)
- 2017 : Contes Cruels (Album)
- 2020 : Nomad’s Land (Album)
- 2024 : Narcozik #3 (EP)
- 2024 : Vol de nuit (Album)
