= Gaspar Quintana Jorquera =

Chilean Roman Catholic bishop (1936–2025)

The Most Reverend Gaspar Quintana Jorquera
- Bishop Emeritus of Copiapó
- Archdiocese: La Serena
- Diocese: Copiapó
- Appointed: 26 May 2001
- Term ended: 25 July 2014
- Predecessor: Fernando Ariztía Ruiz
- Successor: Celestino Aós Braco

Orders
- Ordination: 22 March 1964
- Consecration: 1 July 2001 by Francisco Javier Errázuriz Ossa, Manuel Gerardo Donoso Donoso, Fernando Ariztía Ruiz

Personal details
- Born: 5 October 1936 Santiago, Chile
- Died: 27 December 2025 (aged 89) Santiago, Chile
- Motto: Conservar la Palabra en el corazón

Gaspar Quintana Jorquera (5 October 1936 – 27 December 2025) was a Chilean Roman Catholic prelate. He was Bishop of Copiapó from 2001 to 2014. Quintana Jorquera died on 27 December 2025 at the age of 89.

Catholic Church titles
Preceded by Fernando Ariztía Ruiz	Bishop of Copiapó; 2001–2014	Succeeded by Celestino Aós Braco
