= Vivian Polania =

Colombian lawyer and judge (1987/1988–2025)

- Born: Heidi Vivian Polania Francois; 1987 or 1988; Colombia
- Died: December 17, 2025 (aged 37 or 38); Cúcuta, Norte de Santander, Colombia
- Education: Catholic University of Colombia; Del Rosario University
- Occupations: Lawyer; judge; social media influencer

Heidi Vivian Polania Francois (1987 or 1988 – December 17, 2025), commonly known as Vivian Polania, was a Colombian constitutional lawyer, municipal criminal judge and social media influencer. Her use of Instagram resulted in her being known as "Jueza hot" (English: "the hot judge"). She attracted criticism for her social media activities and for appearing online in court smoking a cigarette, and wearing only underwear. She was warned for her behaviour in 2020 and suspended from 2022 to 2023.

== Education ==
Polania was a graduate of the Catholic University of Colombia and specialised in constitutional law at Del Rosario University. In November 2022, she was studying for a master's degree in human rights.

== Career ==
After graduation, Polania worked as a lawyer at the Supreme Court of Justice of Colombia, before working at the Sectional Council of the Judiciary in Bogotá, and later at the 24th municipal criminal court. In 2018, she relocated to Cucuta to become the municipality's first criminal judge.

Aside from her legal work, Polania marketed clothing sold by US-companies via her Instagram account,, which had 283,000 followers in November 2022. Her Instagram content includes photos of her exercise routines and her wearing lingerie. In 2020, Polania received a judicial warning about her decorum. She was also criticized for her 37 tattoos. In an interview with the Argentinian newspaper, La Nacion, she quoted the Colombian Constitution of 1991, pointing out the right to freedom of expression and that her personal life and work life were separate.

In 2020, a solicitor reported Polania to Colombia’s National Commission of Judicial Ethics after she appeared in online court wearing only underwear and smoking a cigarette. In November 2022, the commission suspended her until February 2023.

== Death ==
Polania was found dead on December 17, 2025, by Colombian authorities in a suspected suicide. She was 37.
