= Yuri Sudakov =

Russian boxer and boxing coach (1948–2025)

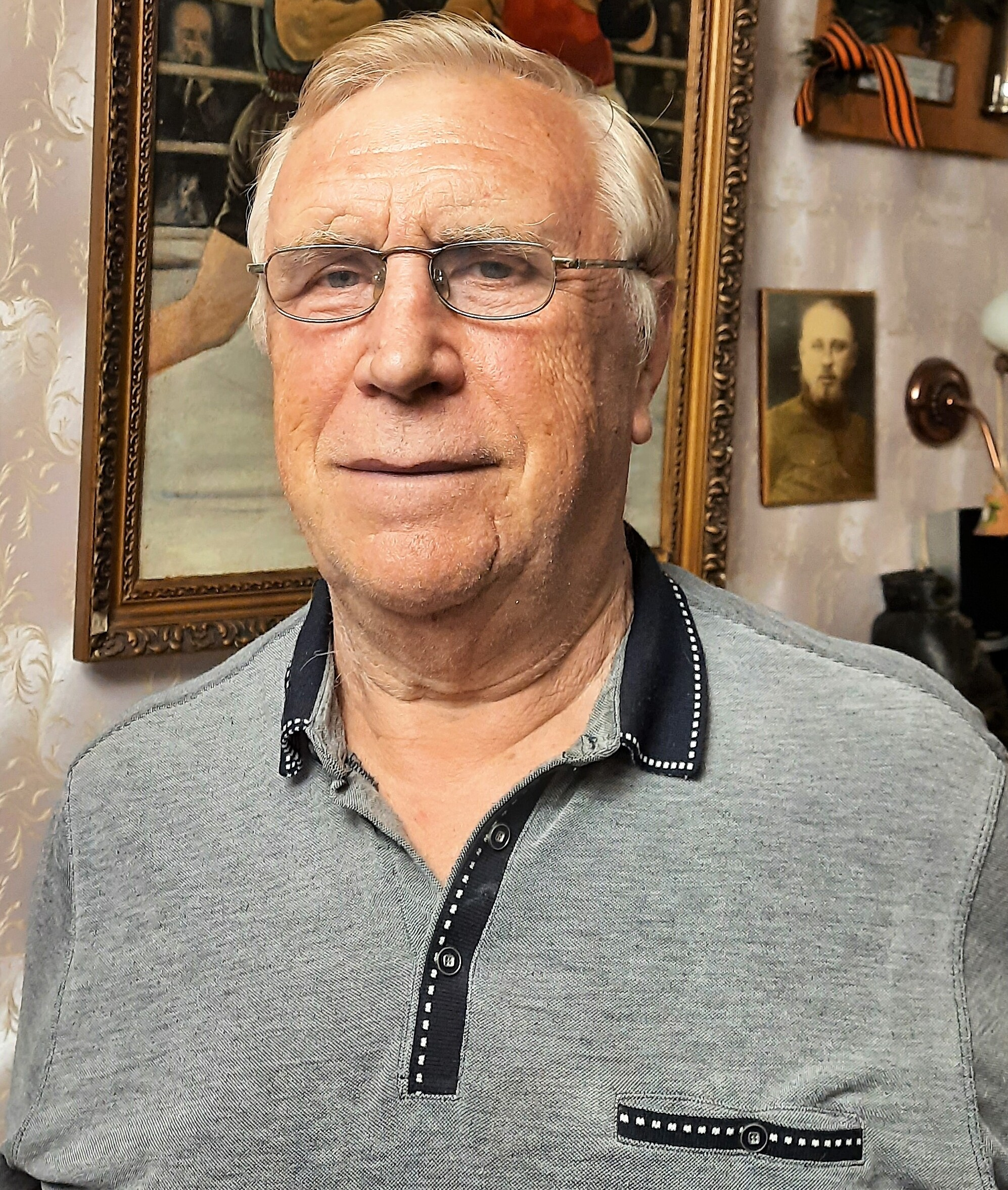
- Sudakov in 2022

Personal information
- Nationality: Soviet Union; Russia
- Born: Yuri Evgenievich Sudakov; 3 July 1948 Moscow, Russian SFSR, USSR
- Died: 31 December 2025 (aged 77)

Boxing career
Medal record
Men's amateur boxing
Representing Soviet Union
USSR Championships
Bronze medal – third place	1976 Sverdlovsk	Heavyweight

Yuri Evgenievich Sudakov (Russian: Юрий Евгеньевич Судаков; 3 July 1948 – 31 December 2025) was a Russian boxer and boxing coach. He competed at the 1976 USSR Boxing Championships, winning the bronze medal in the heavyweight event.

Sudakov died on 31 December 2025, at the age of 77.
