= Syed Shahid Mahdi =

Indian civil servant (1939–2025)

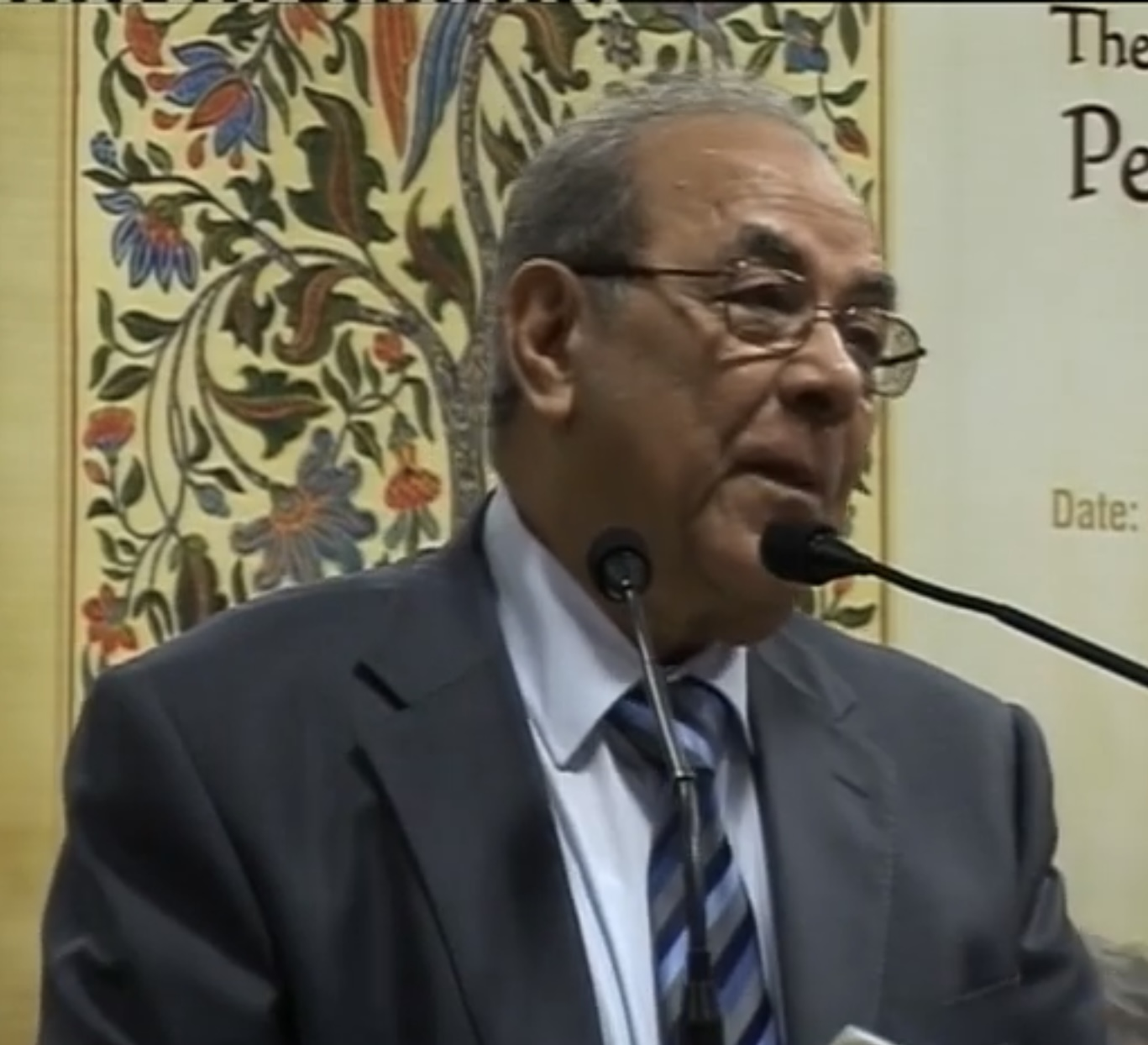

11th Vice-Chancellor of Jamia Millia Islamia
- In office 2000–2004
- Chancellor: Khurshed Alam Khan Fakhruddin T. Khorakiwala
- Preceded by: Mohammad Ahmed Zaki
- Succeeded by: Mushirul Hasan

Personal details
- Born: 1939
- Died: 22 December 2025 (aged 85–86) New Delhi, India

Syed Shahid Mahdi (1939 – 22 December 2025) was an Indian civil servant, United Nations officer, and academician who served as the 11th Vice-Chancellor of Jamia Millia Islamia, from 2000 to 2004.

Mahdi was born in Uttar Pradesh in 1929.

Mahdi was a 1963 batch Indian Administrative Service (IAS) officer and was allotted the Bihar cadre. Between 1959 and 1963, Mahdi served the Government of Bihar in District and at the State headquarters, holding various positions including: Deputy Development Commissioner, Director of Fisheries, Managing Director of the State Cooperative Bank, Managing Director of the State Cooperative Marketing Union, Resident Commissioner in New Delhi.

Between 1983 and 1988, Mahdi had served at FAO headquarters of the United Nations in Rome as Chief of Inter-Agency Affairs in the Director-General’s office. He then held further posts as the chief FAO Representative to Nepal and Yemen.

Mahdi was appointed as the Vice-Chancellor of Jamia Millia Islamia in 2000.

After retiring from the post of vice-chancellor, Mahdi served as the vice-president of Indian Council for Cultural Relations.

Mahdi died in New Delhi on 22 December 2025, and was buried in Jamia Graveyard. He is buried next to his wife, Nikhat Maqbool Mahdi (d. March 31,2020).
