= Antonio Vargiu =

Italian field hockey player (1937–2025)

Personal information
- Nationality: Italian
- Born: 13 May 1937 Villasor, Italy
- Died: 30 November 2025 (aged 88) Rome, Italy

Sport
- Sport: Field hockey

Antonio Vargiu (13 May 1937 – 30 November 2025) was an Italian field hockey player. He competed in the men's tournament at the 1960 Summer Olympics. Vargiu died from injuries sustained after being hit by a motorcycle in Rome, on 30 November 2025, at the age of 88.
