= Siegfried Herrmann (politician) =

Austrian politician (1942–2025)

Member of the Federal Council of Austria
- In office 18 October 1991 – 25 January 1994

Member of the Landtag of Styria
- In office 1987–1991

Personal details
- Born: 16 August 1942 Hartberg, Reichsgau Steiermark, Germany
- Died: 11 December 2025 (aged 83)
- Party: SPÖ
- Occupation: Trade unionist

Siegfried Herrmann (16 August 1942 – 11 December 2025) was an Austrian politician. A member of the Social Democratic Party, he served in the Landtag of Styria from 1987 to 1991 and in the Federal Council from 1991 to 1994.

Herrmann died on 11 December 2025, at the age of 83.
