= Isabelle Marciniak =

Brazilian gymnast (2007–2025)

- Full name: Isabelle Marciniak
- Born: July 17, 2007 Araucária, Paraná, Brazil
- Died: December 24, 2025 (aged 18) Curitiba, Paraná, Brazil

Gymnastics career
- Discipline: Rhythmic gymnastics
- Country represented: Brazil
- Club: Clube Agir
- Retired: 2023
Medal record
Representing Brazil
Women's rhythmic gymnastics
Brazilian Championship “Ilona Peuker”
Gold medal – first place	2021 São Caetano do Sul	Individual all-around (junior)
Gold medal – first place	2021 São Caetano do Sul	Ball (junior)
Silver medal – second place	2021 São Caetano do Sul	Ribbon (junior)
Paraná State Group Championship
Gold medal – first place	2023 Paraná	Adult trio

Isabelle Marciniak (July 17, 2007 – December 24, 2025) was a Brazilian rhythmic gymnast.

== Career ==
Marciniak was born in 2007 in Araucária, a city located in the interior of the state of Paraná. She began her career as a gymnast in her hometown, where she competed in a series of school games and state competitions. She went on to compete for Clube Agir, a traditional team in the metropolitan region of Curitiba, where, at the age of fourteen, she was Brazilian rhythmic gymnastics champion in the youth categories of the Brazilian Rhythmic Gymnastics Championship “Ilona Peuker,” held in São Caetano do Sul, in the Greater São Paulo, where she won gold in the individual all-around and ball events, as well as silver in the ribbon event.

In 2023, still competing for Clube Agir, her club, as part of the team's adult trio, Marciniak helped the team win another national title, adding another medal to her career before taking a break from competition.

== Illness and death ==
Shortly after the 2023 state title, Marciniak was diagnosed with Hodgkin lymphoma and paused her sporting career to undergo treatment. She died on December 24, 2025, at the age of 18, at Hospital Nossa Senhora das Graças, in the Mercês neighborhood of Curitiba.

Her death was mourned by the Brazilian Gymnastics Federation (CBG) and the Brazilian Ministry of Sport.
