= Moisés Fontela =

Argentine politician (1938–2025)

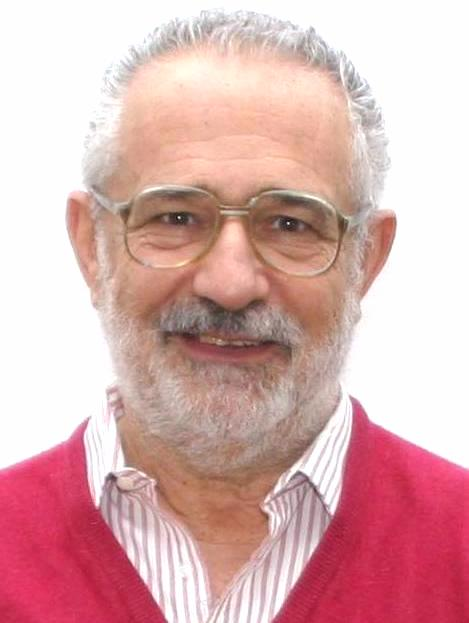

Member of the Argentine Chamber of Deputies for Buenos Aires Province
- In office 10 December 1989 – 10 December 1993

Personal details
- Born: Moisés Eduardo Fontela; 19 November 1938 Pergamino, Argentina
- Died: 3 December 2025 (aged 87) Buenos Aires, Argentina
- Party: PJ
- Education: University of Buenos Aires
- Occupation: Engineer

Moisés Eduardo Fontela (19 November 1938 – 3 December 2025) was an Argentine politician. A member of the Justicialist Party, he served in the Chamber of Deputies from 1989 to 1993.

Before entering politics, Fontela worked as a civil engineer. He was Mayor of Castelli Partido from 1987 to 1989.

Fontela died in Buenos Aires on 3 December 2025, at the age of 87.
