= Mandus Verlinden =

Belgian politician (1937–2025)

Member of the Senate of Belgium
- In office 16 May 1991 – 20 May 1995

Member of the Flemish Parliament
- In office 28 May 1991 – 12 June 1999

Personal details
- Born: 25 February 1937 Gelrode, Belgium
- Died: 15 December 2025 (aged 88) Leuven, Belgium
- Party: PVV; VLD
- Occupation: Business manager

Mandus Verlinden (25 February 1937 – 15 December 2025) was a Belgian politician. A member of the Party for Freedom and Progress and subsequently the Open Flemish Liberals and Democrats, he served in the Senate from 1991 to 1995 and the Flemish Parliament from 1991 to 1999.

Verlinden died in Leuven on 15 December 2025 at the age of 88.
