= 2025 in Spain =

- Decades: 2000s; 2010s; 2020s; 2030s
- See also: History of Spain; Timeline of Spanish history; List of years in Spain

Events in the year 2025 in Spain.

== Incumbents ==
- Monarch – Felipe VI
- Prime Minister – Pedro Sánchez (Sánchez III Government)
- President of the Congress of Deputies – Francina Armengol
- President of the Senate – Pedro Rollán
- President of the Constitutional Court – Cándido Conde-Pumpido
- President of the Supreme Court and the General Council of the Judiciary – Isabel Perelló
- President of the Council of State – Carmen Calvo
- President of the Court of Auditors – Enriqueta Chicano Jávega
- Attorney General – Álvaro García Ortiz
- Ombudsman – Ángel Gabilondo
- Chief of the Defence Staff – Teodoro Esteban López Calderón

== Events ==
=== January ===
- 18 January – A ski lift collapses in Astún, injuring at least 15 people.
- 21 January – One person is killed in an explosion at the Port of Barcelona.

=== February ===
- 6 February – The Supreme Court of Spain overturns the conviction of Rafael Louzán for his involvement in an anomalous construction agreement in Moraña when he was president of the Provincial Deputation of Pontevedra, allowing him to retain his post as head of the Royal Spanish Football Federation.
- 16 February – Long distance runner Jacob Kiplimo sets a world record in the half marathon in Barcelona in a time of 56:42. However, this time did not go on to be ratified due to illegal assistance in drafting from the lead pace car.
- 19 February – Police discover a tunnel measuring at least 50 meters from Ceuta to Morocco and believed to be used to transport drugs following a raid on a warehouse.
- 20 February – Rubiales affair: The Audiencia Nacional convicts former Royal Spanish Football Federation head Luis Rubiales for kissing women's national team player Jenni Hermoso without her consent at the 2023 FIFA Women's World Cup final and orders him to pay a fine of €10,800 (£8,942).

=== March ===
- 19 March – The central government approves a measure allowing for unaccompanied underage migrants held in detention centers in the Canary Islands and Ceuta to be held in other regions of the country to ease overcrowding.
- 20 March – The Congress of Deputies votes in favour of lifting a 2021 ban on hunting Iberian wolves north of the Douro River.
- 28 March – An appeals court in Barcelona overturns the 2024 conviction of former FC Barcelona player Dani Alves for rape.
- 31 March – Five people are killed in an explosion at the Cerredo mine in Degaña, Asturias.

=== April ===
- 2 April – The government ends the practice of giving out golden visas to non-EU citizens investing in property in Spain.
- 12 April – A state of emergency is declared in Lanzarote due to flooding caused by heavy rains.
- 14 April – Architect Antoni Gaudí, who designed the Sagrada Família in Barcelona, is designated as a venerable by Pope Francis.
- 24 April
  - The government cancels an agreement to purchase ammunition from the Israeli firm IMI Systems to be used by the Civil Guard following criticism over the Gaza war.
  - Archaeologists from the University of Barcelona confirm that the remains discovered in Valls, Catalonia, correspond to the ancient Iberian city of Cissa, the scene of the Battle of Cissa during the Second Punic War.
- 28 April – A massive blackout hits the Iberian Peninsula, causing extensive power outages across Spain.

=== May ===
- 4 May – Four segments of a cable used in the signaling system of the Madrid–Seville high-speed rail line are stolen in Toledo, causing extensive travel disruptions.
- 10 May – A fire breaks out at a warehouse storing pool cleaning products in Vilanova i la Geltru, resulting in a massive cloud of chlorine and stay-at-home orders for 160,000 residents.
- 14 May – An explosion occurs at a chemical plant in Alcalá de Guadaíra, resulting in and stay-at-home orders for 80,000 residents.
- 15 May – FC Barcelona wins the 2024–25 La Liga after defeating RCD Espanyol 2-0.
- 19 May – The government orders Airbnb to withdraw 65,935 listings for various irregularities.
- 21 May –
  - Ukrainian politician and Spanish resident Andriy Portnov is shot dead outside a school in the Pozuelo de Alarcón area of Madrid.
  - 2025 UEFA Europa League final in Bilbao
- 25 May – Álex Palou becomes the first Spaniard to win the Indianapolis 500 race.
- 28 May – A boat carrying migrants sinks off the coast of El Hierro, killing seven passengers.
- 31 May – Two British nationals are killed in a shooting at a bar in Fuengirola.

=== June ===
- 3 June – The government cancels a contract by Pap Tecnos, a domestic subsidiary of Israel's Rafael Advanced Defense Systems, to produce 168 SPIKE LR2 anti-tank missile systems valued at 285 million euros ($325 million) following criticism over the Gaza war.
- 8 June – Spain loses the 2025 UEFA Nations League final 5-3 to Portugal in penalties.
- 12 June – Prime Minister Pedro Sánchez issues a public apology over a corruption investigation into senior PSOE official and MP Santos Cerdán.
- 26–29 June – 2025 European Athletics Team Championships
- 30 June–3 July – Fourth United Nations Conference on Financing Development in Seville.

=== July ===
- 1 July – 2025 European heatwaves: Two people are killed in a wildfire that breaks out in Torrefeta i Florejacs, Catalonia, amid a heat wave that affects Spain and other parts of Europe.
- 3 July – Portuguese football player Diogo Jota and his brother André Silva are killed in a car crash in Cernadilla, Zamora Province.
- 8 July – The Mossos d'Esquadra shoots a man dead after he barricaded himself inside his home with three hostages in Calldetenes, Catalonia.
- 10 July – Authorities seize 72 kilograms of cocaine from a boat and an underwater vessel and arrest three people at the Port of Las Palmas, Gran Canaria.
- 12 July – Clashes involving far-right groups, local residents and migrants break out in Torre-Pacheco, Murcia Region, resulting in eight arrests.
- 14 July – A magnitude 5.2 earthquake hits Andalusia, causing damage to Almería Airport.
- 20 July – The Civil Guard arrest eight members of a robbery gang disguised as officers in Tenerife.
- 27 July – Spain finishes in second place at the UEFA Women's Euro 2025 after losing to England 3-1 in the final in Basel, Switzerland.

=== August ===
- 7 August – The town of Jumilla becomes the first town in Spain to pass a law prohibiting municipal sports facilities from being used for religious, cultural or social activities deemed alien to local identity that is seen as a ban on Muslims from using public facilities to celebrate religious events.
- 8 August – A fire breaks out at the Mosque–Cathedral of Córdoba.
- 9 August – The State Meteorological Agency issues an orange heatwave alert for all of the Canary Islands and a red health risk alert for Fuerteventura and Lanzarote due to extreme temperatures.
- 12 August – One person is killed in a wildfire in Tres Cantos, north of Madrid.
- 14 August – One person is killed in a wildfire in León Province.
- 16 August – Two beaches on La Graciosa in the Canary Islands are given black flags by environmental group Ecologistas en Acción due to pollution attributed to mass tourism.
- 21 August – Beaches in Guardamar del Segura, Alicante Province are temporarily closed after sightings of the venomous sea slug Glaucus atlanticus.
- 22 August – A phylloxera infestation is confirmed on 30 sites in Tenerife.
- 24 August – Rescuers save 248 migrants off the Canary Islands, and then bring them to Arguineguín port.
- 26 August – Seventeen people in Gran Canaria and 100 people in La Manga, Murcia fall ill with salmonella from hospital food.

=== September ===
- 3 September – The 11th stage of the 2025 Vuelta a España in Bilbao is prematurely ended without a winner after a group of pro-Palestine protesters try to enter the racetrack as the Israel–Premier Tech team passes by.
- 8 September – Prime Minister Sanchez announces that the government would formally impose a total weapons embargo on Israel over its conduct in the Gaza war.
- 9 September –
  - Spain bars Israeli ministers Itamar Ben-Gvir and Bezalel Smotrich from entering the country over their role in the Gaza war.
  - An outbreak of avian influenza is declared in Andalusia.
- 11 September – UEFA awards the hosting rights of the 2027 UEFA Champions League final to the Metropolitano Stadium in Madrid.
- 14 September – The final stage of the 2025 Vuelta a España in Madrid is prematurely ended after pro-Palestine protesters clash with police over the participation of the Israel–Premier Tech.
- 16 September – Climate of Spain: The State Meteorological Agency reports that the country experienced its hottest summer in 2025 since records began in 1961, averaging a temperature of 24.2 °C (75.6 °F), surpassing 2022's record of 24.1 °C (75.4 °F). The record high temperatures caused three heatwaves over the summer, including the 16-day heatwave in August which sparked wildfires.

=== October ===
- 7 October – Four construction workers are killed in the collapse of a six-story building during renovation works in Madrid.
- 8 October –
  - The Congress of Deputies votes 178–169 to ratify the arms embargo on Israel.
  - Rocío Hernández resigns as regional health minister of Andalusia following criticism over the failure of health officials to notify around 2,000 women of their breast cancer screening results.
- 22 October – Police arrest seven suspected members of a criminal organization that stole 1,100 chairs from outdoor seating areas at restaurants and bars across Madrid and Talavera de la Reina from August to September.
- 27 October – An unidentified drone is seen flying near Alicante–Elche Miguel Hernández Airport, resulting in major disruptions to aviation.
- 30 October – The Sagrada Família church in Barcelona becomes the world's tallest church at 162.91 m (534.5 ft) after a part of its central tower was added during construction, surpassing the previously-tallest Ulm Minster in Ulm, Baden-Württemberg, Germany.

=== November ===
- 3 November – Carlos Mazón announces his resignation as President of the Valencian Government amid criticism over his handling of the 2024 Spanish floods in the Valencian Community.
- 4 November – Clashes break out between police and far-right Se Acabó La Fiesta supporters at the University of Navarra in Pamplona.
- 7 November – Thirteen suspected members of the Tren de Aragua gang are arrested in nationwide police raids that lead to the discovery of two drug laboratories.
- 8 November – Three people are killed while 15 others are injured after being pulled into the Atlantic Ocean by strong waves during a series of tidal surges in Tenerife.
- 15 November – Around 472 animals are seized while four people are arrested in a police raid on an unlicensed animal sanctuary in Avila Province.
- 16 November – Wilmer "Pipo" Chavarria, the leader of the Los Lobos gang in Ecuador who faked his death in 2021, is arrested in Málaga.
- 17 November – Development minister Óscar Puente announces a project to upgrade the Madrid–Barcelona high-speed rail line to a maximum speed of 350 km/h to make it one of the world's fastest trains. Work is scheduled to begin next year and will take three years.
- 18 November – Spain qualifies for the 2026 FIFA World Cup after drawing with Turkey 2-2 at the 2026 FIFA World Cup qualification in Seville.
- 20 November – The Supreme Court of Spain convicts attorney-general Álvaro García Ortiz of leaking confidential information regarding the partner of the Community of Madrid's president, Isabel Díaz Ayuso, and bars him from holding public office for two years.
- 22 November – Rafael Zornoza resigns as bishop of Cádiz amid allegations of sexual abuse against him.
- 28 November – A British passenger dies after going overboard from the cruise ship Marella Explorer 2 off the shore of Tenerife.

=== December ===
- 1 December – Three people are arrested on suspicion of membership in the first known Spanish cell of the neo-Nazi group The Base.
- 2 December – Spain wins the 2025 UEFA Women's Nations League after defeating Germany 3-0 at the final at Metropolitano Stadium in Madrid.
- 4 December –
  - The Netherlands, Ireland, Slovenia and Spain declare a boycott of Eurovision 2026 in response to the European Broadcasting Union's decision to allow Israel to participate in the contest.
  - Eleven people are arrested on charges of smuggling 322 foreign nationals to work illegally in farms across central and eastern Spain.
- 7 December –
  - Spain finishes in third place at the inaugural edition of the FIFA Futsal Women's World Cup held in the Philippines after defeating Argentina 5–1 in the final.
  - Four people are killed and one is reported missing when a wave hits a seawater pool in Los Gigantes on Tenerife.
- 11 December – Two people are arrested in Bilbao for pelting stones at the Paris Saint-Germain team bus during a 2025–26 UEFA Champions League match against Athletic Bilbao.
- 13 December – War on drugs: Authorities dismantle a drug-trafficking network that uses helicopters to transport large quantities of hashish from Morocco, arresting six suspects in a joint operation involving several European countries.
- 15 December – Anti-tourism protests: The government fines homestay company Airbnb €63.9 million (US$75 million) for advertising unlicensed rentals as protests blaming them and Booking.com for driving up property prices continue across the country.
- 21 December – 2025 Extremaduran regional election

== Holidays ==
- 1 January – New Year's Day
- 6 January – Epiphany
- 17 April – Maundy Thursday
- 18 April – Good Friday
- 21 April – Easter Monday
- 1 May – International Workers' Day
- 15 August – Assumption Day
- 12 October – National Day of Spain
- 1 November – All Saints' Day
- 6 December – Constitution Day
- 25 December – Christmas Day

== Art and entertainment ==
- List of 2025 box office number-one films in Spain
- List of Spanish films of 2025
- 39th Goya Awards
- Spain in the Eurovision Song Contest 2025
- 58th Sitges Film Festival

== Deaths ==
- 10 April – Agustín Escobar, 55, president and CEO of Siemens in Spain (since 2022).
- 3 July – Borja Gómez, 20, motorcycle racer (FIM Stock European Championship).
- 7 July – Juan Cutillas, 83, footballer (Atletico Madrid) and coach (Philippines)
- 11 July – Toni Cruz, 78, singer and television producer
- 20 July – Joan Callau i Bartolí, 65, politician
- 8 August – Julián Riera, 84, footballer
- 13 August – José Antonio Marín Rite, 84, lawyer and politician, mayor of Huelva (1979–1988) and president of the Andalusian parliament (1988–1994).
- 14 August –
  - Bernardo Ruiz, 100, racing cyclist, 1948 Vuelta a España winner.
  - José María Saponi, 87, politician, mayor of Cáceres (1995–2007).
- 22 August – Javier Cid, 46, journalist (El Mundo), writer and LGBT rights activist.
- 24 August – Verónica Echegui, 42, actress
- 25 August –
  - Manuel Gausa, 66, architect.
  - José María Sánchez Silva, 74, military officer.
- 27 August – Eusebio Poncela, 79, actor
- 29 August – Arantza Arruti, 79, politician and basque separatist (ETA).
- 30 August –
  - Antonio Masa Godoy, 83, politician, deputy (1977–1979).
  - Víctor Terradellas Maré, 62, businessman and political activist.
- 31 August – Diego de Morón, 78, guitarist.
- 3 September – Vicente Sanchís, 77, basketball referee.
- 6 September – Gustavo Torner, 100, painter and sculptor.
- 1 October – José Antonio Álvarez Sánchez, 50, Roman Catholic prelate, auxiliary bishop of Madrid (since 2024)
- 5 October – Guillermo Fernández Vara, 66, senator (since 2023) and president of Extremadura (2007–2011, 2015–2023)
- 2 November – Rafael de Paula, 85, bullfighter.
- 8 November – Josep Antoni Rom Rodríguez, 61, historian and academic, rector of Ramon Llull University (since 2022).
- 14 November – Encarnita Polo, 86, singer.
- 18 November – Álvaro Domecq Romero, 85, bullfighter and cattle breeder.
- 25 November – Bernardo Álvarez Afonso, 76, Roman Catholic prelate, bishop of San Cristóbal de La Laguna (2005–2024).
- 29 November – José Luis Olivas, 73, president of the Valencian Government (2002–2003).
- 3 December – José Luis Alonso Coomonte, 93, sculptor and academic (University of Salamanca).
- 5 December –
  - Mario Busquets Jordá, 90, Roman Catholic prelate, bishop of Territorial Prelature of Chuquibamba (2001-2015).
  - Alfonso Ussía, 77, writer and journalist.
- 9 December – Jorge Ilegal, 70, musician.
- 17 December – Maria Trayner, 89, activist.
- 27 December – Fernando Martín, 44, footballer (Benidorm, Alcoyano, La Nucía)
- 29 December – Cecilia Giménez, 94, amateur art restorer (Ecce Homo)
- 30 December – Francisco Fernández Marugán, 79, acting Ombudsman (2017–2021) and deputy (1989–2011)
- 31 December – Enric Mestre, 89, ceramist and sculptor

== See also ==
- 2025 in Europe
- 2025 in the European Union
- 2025 in Spanish television
