= Deaths in February 1978 =

The following is a list of notable deaths in February 1978. Entries for each day are listed alphabetically by surname. A typical entry lists information in the following sequence:

- Name, age, country of citizenship at birth, subsequent country of citizenship (if applicable), reason for notability, cause of death (if known), and reference.

== February 1978 ==
=== 1 ===
- Don Freeman, 69, American painter, printmaker, cartoonist, illustrator and children's writer,he was first introduced to children's literature when William Saroyan asked him to illustrate several books,these titles included The Human Comedy (1943), which is considered one of Freeman's best-known works.

=== 2 ===
- Maurice Tillieux, 56, Belgian writer and comics artist,his most famous character was the private investigator Gil Jourdan, published in Spirou magazine, Tillieux was killed in a car accident.

=== 6 ===
- Lorraine Miller, 56, American actress,in 1944, she gained publicity due to her lawsuit concerning a photograph of herself that was printed on postcards;, Miller sued the Photo Specialty Company, her former employer Samuel Goldwyn, and others for $50,000, saying that the widely-distributed postcards harmed her career, reduced her earning power, and embarrassed her;, taken when Miller worked for Goldwyn, the photograph showed Miller in black lingerie on a white fur rug and had the caption "Samuel Goldwyn's Most Cuddlesome Blonde";, the lawsuit said that Miller had not given her consent for the use of the image.

=== 9 ===
- Woody Gelman, 62, American publisher, cartoonist, and writer for both animation and comic books, Gelman was the co-creator of Popsicle Pete and the co-creator of Bazooka Joe for Topps, Gelman and Len Brown co-wrote the original storyline for the science fiction–themed trading card series Mars Attacks (1962),as the publisher of Nostalgia Press, he pioneered the reprinting of vintage comic strips in quality hardcovers and trade paperbacks, one of the earliest Nostalgia Press books was The Picture History of Charlie Chaplin (1965), designed by Gelman and showcasing a large collection of rare Chaplin memorabilia,Gelman had a stroke in 1978 and fell into a coma. He died while still comatose.
- Warren King, 62, American cartoonist, primarily remembered for his political cartoons,King became editorial cartoonist for the New York Daily News after working as Rube Goldberg's assistant,during the early 1940s, he was a main artist for the superhero characters Fox and Firefly while working for the publisher MLJ Comics.
- Kimberly Leach, 12, American student, she was kidnapped from her school and subsequently murdered by the serial killer and escaped prisoner Ted Bundy,Leach's remains were discovered in early April 1978 by a Florida Highway Patrol trooper, the medical examiners who handled the remains concluded that Leach was raped at least twice before having her genitals mutilated and her throat slashed. The murder weapon was believed to be a large hunting knife which Bundy had reportedly purchased on the evening of February 8.
- George Van Tassel, 67, American author, inventor, UFO contactee, aircraft mechanic and flight inspector, between 1930 and 1947, he variously worked for Douglas Aircraft, Hughes Aircraft, and Lockheed,; while at Hughes Aircraft, Van Tassel was their Top Flight Inspector,he hosted "The Giant Rock Interplanetary Spacecraft Convention" annually beside the Giant Rock from 1953 until 1971, his convention attracted at its peak in 1959 as many as 10,000 attendees,; guests trekked to the Mojave Desert by car or landed airplanes on Van Tassel's small airstrip, called Giant Rock Airport; death caused by an unexpected heart attack in a hotel room, just before he was scheduled to give a television show interview detailing his latest scientific discoveries and theories.Van Tassel's house was ransacked during his funeral service and all of his plans, papers, and equipment, including many important components of the Integratron were stolen before anybody returned. Van Tassel's sudden death, along with the mystery surrounding the disappearance of his research, led to many theories that he was silenced by the government to prevent him from unveiling groundbreaking technology to the public.

=== 10 ===
- Redento Maria Gauci, 57, Maltese Carmelite bishop, he took part in all four annual sessions of the Second Vatican Council (1962-1965).

=== 11 ===
- James B. Conant, 84, American chemist, academic, and diplomat, during his military service in World War I, Conant worked on the development of poison gases for the United States Army,; initially, his work concentrated on mustard gas, but in May 1918, Conant took charge of a unit concerned with the development of lewisite, a pilot plant was built, and then a full-scale production plant in Cleveland, but the war ended before lewisite could be used in battle, during World War II, Conant moved to restrict the American cooperation with the United Kingdom on nuclear power, particularly its post-war aspects, and he became involved in heated negotiations with Wallace Akers, the representative of Tube Alloys, the British atomic project, Conant's tough stance, under which the British were excluded except where their assistance was vital, resulted in British retaliation, and a complete breakdown of cooperation between the two countries, Conant's objections were swept aside by Franklin D. Roosevelt, who brokered the 1943 Quebec Agreement with Winston Churchill, that restored full cooperation between the two allied countries,Conant died in a nursing home in Hanover, New Hampshire, incacitated since 1977 due to a series of strokes.
- Harry Martinson, 73, Swedish science fiction writer, poet, and sailor, he is primarily known for the science fiction epic poem Aniara (1956), which has been described as "an epic of extinction, conceived at a moment when extinction had begun to seem not only possible but perhaps imminent", Martinson shared the 1974 Nobel Prize in Literature with Eyvind Johnson, the prize decision sparked heavy criticism in the Swedish press against the Swedish Academy for awarding the Nobel Prize to two of its own members,; although there were also positive reactions to the prize decision, the sensitive Martinson took the negative comments aimed at the Academy personally and found it hard to enjoy the recognition,Martinson committed suicide by cutting his own stomach open with a pair of scissors. His method of suicide has been described as being similar to Japanese seppuku (harakiri), a form of ritualistic suicide by disembowelment.

=== 12 ===
- Wiesław Dymny, 41, Polish poet, prose writer, lyricist, and leader of his own cabaret group, he is credited with writing the lyrics for around 300 songs,death attributed to the side-effects of his increasingly severe alcoholism.

=== 13 ===
- Regina Wallace, 91, American actress, from 1956 to 1962 Wallace appeared in the Broadway production of the musical My Fair Lady,death caused by a stroke.

=== 15 ===
- Ilka Chase, 72, American actress, radio host, and novelist, in the early 1940s, Chase was the hostess for Penthouse Party on CBS and Luncheon Date With Ilka Chase, on NBC Red, in early 1950, Chase co-hosted a CBS television network cultural interview show titled Glamour-Go-Round with Durward Kirby,in late 1950, she became the host of Fashion Magic on Philadelphia's local CBS affiliate, WCAU, death caused by internal hemorrhaging.
- Tadeusz Chyliński, 66, Polish airplane designer and constructor,he designed the fuselage, the landing gear and the tail rotor for the first Polish helicopter, the BŻ-1 GIL (1950).

=== 17 ===
- Bill Hinnant, 42, American actor, his most successful role came in March 1967, when he was cast as Snoopy in the off-Broadway production of Clark Gesner's You're a Good Man, Charlie Brown, after voicing the character on Gesner's ten-song concept album, Hinnant was praised as the "most strikingly talented of the cast" and won a Drama Desk Award for his performance, Hinnant drowned while vacationing in the Dominican Republic.

=== 18 ===
- Derrick De Marney, 71, British actor,he is perhaps best remembered for his starring role as Robert Tisdall, a character falsely accused of murder in Alfred Hitchcock's Young and Innocent (1937), De Marney portrayed the politician Benjamin Disraeli in both the historical film Victoria the Great (1937) and its sequel, Sixty Glorious Years (1938).
- Kathleen Lockhart, 83, English-American actress and musician, she appeared on stage and in Hollywood films for almost forty years, and had more than 30 film credits, she has a star on the Hollywood Walk of Fame at 6241 Hollywood Boulevard, she died due to an unspecified "long illness".
- Maggie McNamara, 49, American actress, fashion model, and screenwriter, she was nominated for the Academy Award for Best Actress for her role as Patty O'Neill in the romantic comedy The Moon Is Blue,she committed suicide with a deliberate overdose of sleeping pills and tranquilizers. She left a suicide note on her piano. According to police reports, McNamara had a history of mental illness, and friends reported that she had suffered from severe depression.

=== 19 ===
- Ovila Légaré, 76, French-Canadian actor and singer,originally a violinist, Légaré injured his hand in a printing accident, and then took up theatre and singing instead, he had a number of significant roles on radio.
- Pankaj Mullick, 72, Indian composer, playback singer, and actor, he contributed in various capacities to films recorded in four different languages (Bengali, Hindi, Urdu and Tamil) for 38 years, starting in 1931, he served as the music director of the film studio New Theatres Calcutta.
- Don Sahlin, 49, American Muppet designer and builder who worked for Jim Henson from 1962 until 1977,Henson described Sahlin as "the man most responsible for the look of the Muppets,"Sahlin began making puppets at age 11, initially building a shadow theater and cardboard figurines, as an adult he built several puppets for the television series Kukla, Fran and Ollie (1947-1957) and created special effects sequences for films such as G.I. Blues (1960) and The Time Machine (1960),death attributed to a possible heart attack.

=== 20 ===
- Vitorino Nemésio, 76, Portuguese writer, intellectual, and university professor,he was the presenter of the television series Se Bem Me Lembro (1969-1975), the extensive popularity of the series during its six years on air made Nemésio a household name, with the series being better remembered by the public than Nemésio's relatively obscure literary works and essays.

=== 22 ===
- Dennie Moore, 75, American actress,she was primarily a freelance actress, spending much of her film career floating between the productions of two different studios, Metro-Goldwyn-Mayer and Warner Bros. Studios,in her stage roles, she is primarily remembered for creating the role of Mrs. Van Daan in the stage adaptation The Diary of Anne Frank (1955), she died due to unspecified "natural causes" within her own Manhattan apartment. She had no known family at the time of her death, and she left no immediate survivors.
- Debbie Weems, 28, American actress and singer, primarily remembered for her recurring roles on the children's television series Captain Kangaroo, she either committed suicide by jumping or accidentally fell from a building in New York City, under unclear circumstances.

=== 24 ===
- Franco Arcalli, 48, Italian film editor, screenwriter, and (briefly) actor, Arcalli started his film career in Venice, but later moved back to his birthplace in the city of Rome, where in a few years he imposed himself as a "creative" editor,; even while working in the employ of the film company Euro International Film, he got the power of choice for the films to work on, he started some critically acclaimed collaborations with the directors Giulio Questi, Salvatore Samperi, Giuseppe Patroni Griffi and specially Bernardo Bertolucci (The Conformist, Last Tango in Paris, 1900) and Michelangelo Antonioni (Zabriskie Point, The Passenger),Arcalli died due to cancer in 1978, while he was engaged in the writing process of Sergio Leone's Once Upon a Time in America and Bernardo Bertolucci's La Luna.
- Alma Thomas, 86, American painter and art teacher, in the 1960s, she began creating Color Field paintings, inspired by the work of the New York School and Abstract Expressionism, toward the end of her life, her style moved "to a color-filled, impastoed geometric abstraction of tessellated brushstroke patterns", these paintings by Thomas have been compared to Byzantine mosaics and the pointillist paintings of Georges-Pierre Seurat,death attributed to post-surgery complications following an aortic surgery.

=== 28 ===
- Philip Ahn, 72, American actor and activist, he helped to bring the Korean Bell of Friendship to San Pedro, Los Angeles, and the item went on to appear in many films, death caused by complications from surgery for lung cancer. His biopsy operation had resulted in infection with pneumonia.
- Zara Cully, 86. American actress, her best known role was portraying the character of Olivia "Mother Jefferson" Jefferson in the CBS sitcoms All in the Family and The Jeffersons,death caused by lung cancer.

== Sources ==
- Dekle, George R. Sr. (2011). The Last Murder: The Investigation, Prosecution, and Execution of Ted Bundy (Hardcover ed.). Santa Barbara, California: Praeger (Imprint of ABC-CLIO). ISBN 978-0-313-39743-1.
- Hershberg, James G. (1993). James B. Conant: Harvard to Hiroshima and the Making of the Nuclear Age. New York: Knopf. ISBN 0-394-57966-6. OCLC 27678159.
- Patton, Sharon F. African-American Art. Oxford: Oxford University Press (1998). ISBN 978-01-92842-13-8
- Sullivan, Kevin M. (2009). The Bundy Murders: A Comprehensive History (Paperback ed.). Jefferson, North Carolina: McFarland and Co. ISBN 978-0-7864-4426-7.
