= Arruti =

Arruti is a surname. Notable people with the surname include:

- Amaia Arruti (born 1970), Spanish professional golfer
- Arantza Arruti (1946–2025), Spanish politician
