= 2023 FIM Stock European Championship =

Edition of a motorsport season

2023 FIM Stock European Championship
| Previous: | none | Next: | 2024 |
Support series: JuniorGP World Championship; FIM Moto2 European Championship; European Talent Cup

The 2023 FIM Stock European Championship is the inaugural season of the FIM Stock European Championship and the first under the FIM banner. This is the first season after the separation with the FIM Moto2 European Championship. Daniel Muñoz won the title after beating closest rival Eric Fernández.

== Calendar ==
The provisional calendar was published in November 2022

| Round | Date | Circuit | Pole position | Fastest lap | Race winner | Winning team | Winning constructor | Ref |
|---|---|---|---|---|---|---|---|---|
| 1 | 7 May | Estoril | (Spain) Eric Fernández | (Spain) Daniel Muñoz | (Spain) Daniel Muñoz | SP57 Racing Team | (Japan) Yamaha | |
| 2 | 21 May | Valencia | (Spain) Daniel Muñoz | (Spain) Daniel Muñoz | (Spain) Daniel Muñoz | SP57 Racing Team | (Japan) Yamaha | |
| 3 | 4 June | Jerez | (Spain) Daniel Muñoz | (Spain) Eric Fernández | (Spain) Eric Fernández | Fau55 Tey Racing | (Japan) Yamaha | |
| 4 | 2 July | Portimão | (Spain) Daniel Muñoz | (Spain) Daniel Muñoz | (Spain) Daniel Muñoz | SP57 Racing Team | (Japan) Yamaha | |
| 5 | 16 July | Barcelona | (Spain) Daniel Muñoz | (Spain) Daniel Muñoz | (Spain) Daniel Muñoz | SP57 Racing Team | (Japan) Yamaha | |
| 6 | 8 October | Aragón | (Spain) Daniel Muñoz | (Spain) Eric Fernández | (Spain) Eric Fernández | Fau55 Tey Racing | (Japan) Yamaha | |
| 7 | 5 November | Valencia | (Spain) Daniel Muñoz | (Spain) Eric Fernández | (Spain) Daniel Muñoz | SP57 Racing Team | (Japan) Yamaha | |

== Entry list ==
| Team | Constructor | No. | Rider | Rounds |
|---|---|---|---|---|
| (Spain) Kawasaki Palmeto PL Racing | Kawasaki | 61 | (Spain) Javier Del Olmo | All |
| (Italy) AC Racing Team | Yamaha | 64 | (Argentina) Nazareno Gomez | 1–5 |
| (Spain) Cardoso-Fantic Racing | Yamaha | 30 | (Italy) Paolo di Vittori | 6 |
| (United Kingdom) CF Motorsport | Yamaha | 74 | (United Kingdom) Carter Brown | All |
| (United Kingdom) CF Motorsport | Yamaha | 99 | (United Kingdom) Jack Bednarek | 1, 3–6 |
| (Spain) Easyrace Team | Yamaha | 8 | (Spain) Marco García | All |
| (Spain) Easyrace Team | Yamaha | 37 | (United Kingdom) Corey Tinker | 1–5 |
| (Spain) Easyrace Team | Yamaha | 44 | (Spain) Adrián Rodríguez | All |
| (Spain) Fau55 Tey Racing | Yamaha | 4 | (Spain) Eric Fernández | All |
| (Spain) Fau55 Tey Racing | Yamaha | 10 | (Mexico) Guillermo Moreno | All |
| (Spain) Fau55 Tey Racing | Yamaha | 86 | (Italy) Kylian Nestola | All |
| (Spain) Fau55 Tey Racing | Yamaha | 95 | (Spain) Borja Jiménez | 5–7 |
| (Spain) Fifty Motorsport | Yamaha | 3 | (Italy) Pasquale Alfano | 1 |
| (Spain) Fifty Motorsport | Yamaha | 23 | (Spain) Alex Millán | 1–6 |
| (Spain) Frando Racing VHC Team | Yamaha | 34 | (United States) Britanni Belladona | 6–7 |
| Hella Moto Sport Bulgaria | Yamaha | 91 | (Bulgaria) Mihail Florov | 6 |
| (Spain) IUM Motorsports | Yamaha | 13 | (Italy) Dino Iozzo | All |
| (Spain) IUM Motorsports | Yamaha | 22 | (Australia) Declan Van Rosmalen | 7 |
| (Portugal) LST Motorsport | Yamaha | 73 | (Portugal) Gonçalo Ribeiro | 1–6 |
| (Bulgaria) MDR Competicion | Yamaha | 25 | (Hungary) Bence Kecskes | 6 |
| (Spain) MMG-Pinamoto RS | Yamaha | 3 | (Italy) Pasquale Alfano | 4–5 |
| (Spain) MMG-Pinamoto RS | Yamaha | 6 | (Romania) Jacopo Hosciuc | 1, 3–5 |
| (Spain) MMG-Pinamoto RS | Yamaha | 84 | (Colombia) Juanes Rivera | 3 |
| (Spain) MMG-Pinamoto RS | Yamaha | 85 | (Poland) Mateusz Hulewicz | All |
| (Spain) MRE Talent | Yamaha | 69 | (Australia) Archie McDonald | All |
| (Spain) SP57 Racing Team | Yamaha | 17 | (Spain) Daniel Muñoz | All |
| (Spain) Superhugo44 Team | Yamaha | 23 | (Spain) Alex Millán | 7 |
| (Spain) Superhugo44 Team | Yamaha | 58 | (Spain) Jose Luis Armario | 5–7 |
| (Spain) Yamaha GV Stratos | Yamaha | | | |
| (Spain) Yamaha GV Stratos | Yamaha | 11 | (Spain) Iker Garcia | 7 |
| (Spain) Yamaha GV Stratos | Yamaha | 21 | (United Kingdom) Daniel Brooks | 2 |
| (Spain) Yamaha GV Stratos | Yamaha | 21 | (United Kingdom) Daniel Brooks | 4–7 |
| (Spain) Yamaha GV Stratos | Yamaha | 24 | (Argentina) Maximiliano Rocha | 1–5 |
| (Spain) Yamaha GV Stratos | Yamaha | 29 | (Spain) Kike Ferrer | 5–6 |
| (Spain) Yamaha GV Stratos | Yamaha | 38 | (Spain) Juan Rodríguez | 6 |
| (Spain) Yamaha GV Stratos | Yamaha | 82 | (Spain) Mario Frances | All |
| (Spain) Yamaha GV Stratos | Yamaha | 91 | (Bulgaria) Mihail Florov | 1–2 |

Key
Regular rider
Wildcard rider
Replacement rider

- All entries used Dunlop tyres.

== Championship standings ==
Scoring system

Points were awarded to the top fifteen finishers. A rider had to finish the race to earn points.

| Position | 1st | 2nd | 3rd | 4th | 5th | 6th | 7th | 8th | 9th | 10th | 11th | 12th | 13th | 14th | 15th |
| Points | 25 | 20 | 16 | 13 | 11 | 10 | 9 | 8 | 7 | 6 | 5 | 4 | 3 | 2 | 1 |

=== Riders' championship ===
| Pos. | Rider | Bike | EST (Portugal) | VAL (Spain) | JER (Spain) | POR (Portugal) | CAT (Spain) | ARA (Spain) | VAL (Spain) | Points |
|---|---|---|---|---|---|---|---|---|---|---|
| 1 | (Spain) Daniel Muñoz | Yamaha | 1 | 1 | 2 | 1 | 1 | 2 | 1 | 165 |
| 2 | (Spain) Eric Fernández | Yamaha | Ret | 2 | 1 | 2 | 2 | 1 | 2 | 130 |
| 3 | (Spain) Marco García | Yamaha | 2 | 7 | 4 | 3 | 4 | 5 | 3 | 98 |
| 4 | (Italy) Dino Iozzo | Yamaha | Ret | 3 | 3 | 7 | 3 | 3 | Ret | 73 |
| 5 | (Australia) Archie McDonald | Yamaha | 6 | 4 | 6 | 4 | 8 | 7 | 7 | 72 |
| 6 | (Spain) Mario Frances | Yamaha | 4 | 8 | 5 | 6 | 20 | 6 | 5 | 63 |
| 7 | (Spain) Adrián Rodríguez | Yamaha | 5 | 5 | 13 | 8 | 5 | 11 | 4 | 62 |
| 8 | (Spain) Alex Millán | Yamaha | 3 | 6 | Ret | 5 | 6 | Ret | 9 | 54 |
| 9 | (Mexico) Guillermo Moreno | Yamaha | 9 | 10 | 9 | 15 | 10 | 9 | 11 | 39 |
| 10 | (United Kingdom) Corey Tinker | Yamaha | 7 | 9 | 7 | 14 | Ret | | | 27 |
| 11 | (Argentina) Maximilano Rocha | Yamaha | 8 | 13 | 11 | 10 | 11 | | | 27 |
| 12 | (Spain) Jose Luis Armario | Yamaha | | | | | 12 | 8 | 6 | 22 |
| 13 | (United Kingdom) Daniel Brooks | Yamaha | | 11 | | 12 | 13 | 10 | 12 | 22 |
| 14 | (Italy) Kylian Nestola | Yamaha | 11 | 12 | Ret | 19 | 17 | 12 | 10 | 19 |
| 15 | (Romania) Jacopo Hosciuc | Yamaha | DNQ | | 8 | 9 | Ret | | | 15 |
| 16 | (Spain) Juan Rodríguez | Yamaha | | | | | | 4 | | 13 |
| 17 | (United Kingdom) Carter Brown | Yamaha | Ret | Ret | 17 | 13 | 9 | DNS | Ret | 10 |
| 18 | (Spain) Borja Jiménez | Yamaha | | | | | 7 | Ret | Ret | 9 |
| 19 | (Spain) Iker Garcia | Yamaha | | | | | | | 8 | 8 |
| 20 | (Italy) Pasquale Alfano | Yamaha | WD | | | 11 | 14 | | | 7 |
| 21 | (Portugal) Gonçalo Ribeiro | Yamaha | 13 | 18 | 12 | Ret | DNS | 20 | | 7 |
| 22 | (Poland) Mateusz Hulewicz | Yamaha | Ret | 14 | Ret | 16 | 15 | 15 | 13 | 7 |
| 23 | (Bulgaria) Mihail Florov | Yamaha | 10 | 16 | | | | 16 | | 6 |
| 24 | (Colombia) Juanes Rivera | Yamaha | | | 10 | | | | | 6 |
| 25 | (Spain) Javier Del Olmo | Kawasaki | 14 | 15 | 15 | 17 | 16 | 14 | Ret | 6 |
| 26 | (United Kingdom) Jack Bednarek | Yamaha | 12 | | 16 | Ret | 18 | 17 | | 4 |
| 27 | (Hungary) Bence Kecskes | Yamaha | | | | | | 13 | | 3 |
| 28 | (Argentina) Nazareno Gomez | Yamaha | 15 | 17 | 14 | 18 | 19 | | | 3 |
| 29 | (Australia) Declan Van Rosmalen | Yamaha | | | | | | | 14 | 2 |
| 30 | (United States) Britanni Belladona | Yamaha | | | | | | 18 | 15 | 1 |
| | (Italy) Paolo di Vittori | Yamaha | | | | | | 19 | | 0 |
| | (Spain) Kike Ferrer | Yamaha | | | | | 21 | DNS | | 0 |
| Pos. | Rider | Bike | EST (Portugal) | VAL (Spain) | JER (Spain) | POR (Portugal) | CAT (Spain) | ARA (Spain) | VAL (Spain) | Points |

| Colour | Result |
|---|---|
| Gold | Winner |
| Silver | Second place |
| Bronze | Third place |
| Green | Points classification |
| Blue | Non-points classification |
| Blue | Non-classified finish (NC) |
| Purple | Retired, not classified (Ret) |
| Red | Did not qualify (DNQ) |
| Red | Did not pre-qualify (DNPQ) |
| Black | Disqualified (DSQ) |
| White | Did not start (DNS) |
| White | Withdrew (WD) |
| White | Race cancelled (C) |
| Blank | Did not practice (DNP) |
| Blank | Did not arrive (DNA) |
| Blank | Excluded (EX) |

P – Pole position
F – Fastest lap
Source :
