= 2024 FIM Stock European Championship =

Edition of a motorsport season

2024 FIM Stock European Championship
Previous:	2023	Next:	2025
Support series: JuniorGP World Championship; 2024 FIM Moto2 European Championship; European Talent Cup

The 2024 FIM Stock European Championship is the second season of the FIM Stock European Championship and the second under the FIM banner. This is the second season after the separation with the FIM Moto2 European Championship.

== Calendar ==
The provisional calendar was published in November 2023

Round	Date	Circuit	Pole position	Fastest lap	Race winner	Winning team	Winning constructor	Ref
1	21 April	Misano	(Italy) Lorenzo Dalla Porta	(France) Andy Verdoïa	(Italy) Lorenzo Dalla Porta	Yamaha GV Racing	Yamaha	
2	5 May	Estoril	(South Africa) Dino Iozzo	(Spain) Adrián Rodríguez	(Spain) Adrián Rodríguez	SF Racing	Yamaha	
3	19 May	Barcelona	(Italy) Lorenzo Dalla Porta	(Spain) Mario Mayor	(Italy) Lorenzo Dalla Porta	Yamaha GV Racing	Yamaha	
4	23 June	Algarve	(Australia) Archie McDonald	(South Africa) Dino Iozzo	(Australia) Archie McDonald	MRE Talent	Yamaha	
5	15 September	Jerez	(Spain) Mario Mayor	(Spain) Mario Mayor	(Spain) Mario Mayor	GV Macrobonsai Racing	Yamaha	
6	13 October	Aragón	(Spain) Rubén Romero	(Italy) Demis Mihaila	(Italy) Demis Mihaila	MDR Competicion	Yamaha	
7	27 November	Estoril	(South Africa) Dino Iozzo	(South Africa) Dino Iozzo	(South Africa) Dino Iozzo	IUM Motorsports	Yamaha	

== Entry list ==
Team	Constructor	No.	Rider	Rounds
(Spain) Team Honda Laglisse	Honda	8	(Spain) Marco García	4–7
(Spain) Team Honda Laglisse	Honda	18	(Spain) Aleix Viu	5
(Spain) Team Honda Laglisse	Honda	25	(France) Andy Verdoïa	1–6
(Spain) Team Honda Laglisse	Honda	35	(Spain) Yeray Saiz	1–3
(Spain) Team Honda Laglisse	Honda	51	(Mexico) Juan Uriostegui	All
(Spain) Team Honda Laglisse	Honda	53	(Spain) Javier Palomera	7
(Spain) Kawasaki Palmeto PL Racing	Kawasaki	61	(Spain) Javier Del Olmo	All
(Spain) DR Andifer Team	Yamaha	26	(Spain) Francisco Ruiz	1–4
(Spain) DR Andifer Team	Yamaha	32	(Portugal) Rodrigo Valente	5–6
(Spain) DR Andifer Team	Yamaha	35	(Spain) Yeray Saiz	4, 7
(Spain) DR Andifer Team	Yamaha	67	(Spain) Carlos Valle	1–3, 5–7
(Spain) Easyrace Team	Yamaha	8	(Spain) Marco García	1–2
(Spain) Easyrace Team	Yamaha	76	(Portugal) Gonçalo Capote	3–7
(Colombia) Echeverry Racing Team	Yamaha	4	(Colombia) Pablo Echeverry	1, 3–5, 7
(Spain) Face Racing	Yamaha	71	(Spain) Rubén Romero	All
(Spain) Fantic Cardoso Racing	Yamaha	33	(Czech Republic) Filip Rehacek	All
(Italy) Fau55 Tey Racing	Yamaha	64	(Italy) Davide Fabbri	1–3, 5–7
(Italy) Fau55 Tey Racing	Yamaha	91	(Spain) Borja Jiménez	All
(Italy) Fau55 Tey Racing	Yamaha	99	(Saudi Arabia) Mohammed Binladin	4
(Spain) Fifty Motorsport	Yamaha	3	(Italy) Niccolò Bergamasco	5
(Spain) Fifty Motorsport	Yamaha	14	(India) Kavin Quintal	2–4, 6
(Spain) Fifty Motorsport	Yamaha	26	(Spain) Francisco Ruiz	6
(Spain) Fifty Motorsport	Yamaha	28	(Greece) Spyros Fourthiotis	1
(Spain) Fifty Motorsport	Yamaha	43	(Spain) Eric Molina	6–7
(Spain) Fifty Motorsport	Yamaha	47	(Hungary) Erik Varga	4–5
(Spain) Fifty Motorsport	Yamaha	72	(Spain) Yeray Ruiz	5
(Spain) Fifty Motorsport	Yamaha	73	(Portugal) Gonçalo Ribeiro	1–5, 7
(Spain) Fifty Motorsport	Yamaha	75	(Italy) Alessio Guarnieri	1–2, 7
(Spain) Frando Racing VHC Team	Yamaha	25	(France) Andy Verdoïa	7
(Spain) Frando Racing VHC Team	Yamaha	26	(Spain) Francisco Ruiz	5
(Spain) Frando Racing VHC Team	Yamaha	34	(United States) Britanni Belladona	1–3, 6
(Spain) IUM Motorsports	Yamaha	13	(South Africa) Dino Iozzo	All
(Spain) IUM Motorsports	Yamaha	22	(Australia) Declan Van Rosmalen	1–5, 7
(Spain) MDR Competición	Yamaha	31	(Spain) David Jiménez	5
(Spain) MDR Competición	Yamaha	80	(Hungary) Bence Kecskés	1–4, 6–7
(Spain) MDR Competición	Yamaha	89	(Romania) Denis Mihaila	All
(Spain) MRE Talent	Yamaha	69	(Australia) Archie McDonald	1–4, 6–7
(Spain) Pinamoto RS	Yamaha	36	(Italy) Cristian D'Arliano	7
(Spain) Pinamoto RS	Yamaha	39	(Italy) Andrea Bettin	1–3
(Spain) Pinamoto RS	Yamaha	57	(Austria) Kilian Holzer	1–2, 4–5, 7
(Spain) Pinamoto RS	Yamaha	88	(Poland) Mateusz Hulewicz	3
(Spain) Pinamoto RS	Yamaha	97	(South Korea) Kim Jeong Soo	6
(Spain) PS Racing	Yamaha	19	(China) Shuai Li	All
(Spain) PS Racing	Yamaha	32	(Portugal) Rodrigo Valente	7
(Spain) PS Racing	Yamaha	92	(Spain) Nil Roig	1–4
(Italy) SF Racing	Yamaha	29	(Italy) Massimo Coppa	1–2, 4–6
(Italy) SF Racing	Yamaha	44	(Spain) Adrián Rodríguez	1–6
(Italy) SF Racing	Yamaha	86	(Switzerland) Kylian Nestola	1–6
(Spain) Superhugo44 Team	Yamaha	58	(Spain) Jose Luis Armario	All
(Italy) Team Zivimotor	Yamaha	7	(Italy) Manuel Rocca	1, 4
(Italy) Team Zivimotor	Yamaha	23	(Spain) Alex Millán	2–3
(Italy) Team Zivimotor	Yamaha	39	(Italy) Andrea Bettin	6
(Italy) Team Zivimotor	Yamaha	44	(Spain) Adrián Rodríguez	7
(Italy) Team Zivimotor	Yamaha	77	(Italy) Daniele Galloni	7
(Spain) Yamaha GV Racing; GV Macrobonsai Racing; GV Tamoil Racing	Yamaha	2	(Italy) Nicholas Bevilacqua	All
(Spain) Yamaha GV Racing; GV Macrobonsai Racing; GV Tamoil Racing	Yamaha	11	(Spain) Iker García	All
(Spain) Yamaha GV Racing; GV Macrobonsai Racing; GV Tamoil Racing	Yamaha	21	(United Kingdom) Daniel Brooks	1–4
(Spain) Yamaha GV Racing; GV Macrobonsai Racing; GV Tamoil Racing	Yamaha	24	(Spain) Alberto García	7
(Spain) Yamaha GV Racing; GV Macrobonsai Racing; GV Tamoil Racing	Yamaha	27	(Italy) Benedetto Rasa	2–3
(Spain) Yamaha GV Racing; GV Macrobonsai Racing; GV Tamoil Racing	Yamaha	48	(Italy) Lorenzo Dalla Porta	1–3, 5–7
(Spain) Yamaha GV Racing; GV Macrobonsai Racing; GV Tamoil Racing	Yamaha	62	(Spain) Blai Trias	5–6
(Spain) Yamaha GV Racing; GV Macrobonsai Racing; GV Tamoil Racing	Yamaha	74	(United Kingdom) Carter Brown	4
(Spain) Yamaha GV Racing; GV Macrobonsai Racing; GV Tamoil Racing	Yamaha	81	(Spain) Joan Santos	1–6
(Spain) Yamaha GV Racing; GV Macrobonsai Racing; GV Tamoil Racing	Yamaha	82	(Spain) Mario Mayor	All
Entry lists:

== Championship standings ==
Scoring system

Points were awarded to the top fifteen finishers. A rider had to finish the race to earn points.

Position	1st	2nd	3rd	4th	5th	6th	7th	8th	9th	10th	11th	12th	13th	14th	15th
Points	25	20	16	13	11	10	9	8	7	6	5	4	3	2	1

=== Riders' championship ===
Pos.	Rider	Bike	MIS (San Marino)	EST (Portugal)	CAT (Spain)	POR (Portugal)	JER (Spain)	ARA (Spain)	EST (Portugal)	Points
1	(Spain) Mario Mayor	Yamaha	4	8	2	2	1	6	4	109
2	(Italy) Lorenzo Dalla Porta	Yamaha	1	5	1		3	7	3	102
3	(Romania) Demis Mihaila	Yamaha	13	6	3	4	4	1	Ret	80
4	(South Africa) Dino Iozzo	Yamaha	3	Ret	Ret	NC	2	4	1	74
5	(Spain) Adrián Rodríguez	Yamaha	DNS	1	10	3	Ret	3	8	71
6	(France) Andy Verdoïa	Honda	2	Ret	6	6	6	10		67
6	(France) Andy Verdoïa	Yamaha							5	67
7	(Australia) Archie McDonald	Yamaha	8	14	15	1		12	2	60
8	(Spain) Borja Jiménez	Yamaha	7	Ret	4	7	8	5	7	59
9	(Spain) Iker García	Yamaha	11	2	9	Ret	Ret	8	10	46
10	(Spain) Rubén Romero	Yamaha	14	10	8	Ret	Ret	2	12	40
11	(Spain) Francisco Ruiz	Yamaha	5	3	12	12	WD	14		37
12	(Spain) Jose Luis Armario	Yamaha	9	16	5	8	12	13	17	33
13	(Spain) Nil Roig	Yamaha	6	7	11	13				27
14	(Spain) Carlos Valle	Yamaha	16	13	13		5	11	13	25
15	(Spain) Alex Millán	Yamaha		4	7					22
16	(Spain) Blai Trias	Yamaha					7	9		16
17	(Spain) Joan Santos	Yamaha	DNQ	15	16	9	9	19		15
18	(Spain) Marco García	Yamaha	10	22						14
18	(Spain) Marco García	Honda				WD	10	15	15	14
19	(Hungary) Erik Varga	Yamaha				5	Ret			11
20	(Spain) Alberto García	Yamaha							6	10
21	(India) Kavin Quintal	Yamaha		9	26	23		Ret		7
22	(Spain) Javier Del Olmo	Kawasaki	DNS	17	17	Ret	16	17	9	7
23	(Mexico) Juan Iriostegui	Honda	WD	Ret	20	10	15	20	16	7
24	(Italy) Massimo Coppa	Yamaha	15	Ret		21	11	23		6
25	(Switzerland) Kylian Nestola	Yamaha	12	21	14	Ret	Ret	18		6
26	(Portugal) Gonçalo Ribeiro	Yamaha	24	11	30	18	Ret		19	5
27	(Hungary) Bence Kecskés	Yamaha	DNS	NC	Ret	11		Ret	Ret	5
28	(Spain) Javier Palomera	Honda							11	5
29	(Italy) Davide Fabbri	Yamaha	19	12	25		19	26	24	4
30	(Austria) Kilian Holzer	Yamaha	20	WD		DNS	13		21	3
31	(Italy) Manuel Rocca	Yamaha	DNS			14				2
32	(Spain) David Jiménez	Yamaha					14			2
33	(Czech Republic) Filip Rehacek	Yamaha	DNS	23	18	Ret	Ret	24	14	2
34	(Spain) Yeray Saiz	Honda	18	DNQ	21					1
34	(Spain) Yeray Saiz	Yamaha				15			23	1
35	(Australia) Declan Van Rosmalen	Yamaha	DNS	Ret	19	16	21		Ret	0
36	(Spain) Eric Molina	Yamaha						16	DNS	0
37	(Italy) Andrea Bettin	Yamaha	17	18	22			21		0
38	(United Kingdom) Carter Brown	Yamaha				17				0
39	(Portugal) Gonçalo Capote	Yamaha			23	Ret	17	22	18	0
40	(Colombia) Pablo Echeverry	Yamaha	22		27	22	18		Ret	0
41	(United States) Britanni Belladona	Yamaha	DNQ	19	WD			DNS		0
42	(United Kingdom) Daniel Brooks	Yamaha	25	Ret	24	19				0
43	(Italy) Nicholas Bevilacqua	Yamaha	21	Ret	29	DNQ	20	27	22	0
44	(Italy) Benedetto Rasa	Yamaha		20	28					0
45	(Saudi Arabia) Mohammed Binladin	Yamaha				20				0
46	(Italy) Daniele Galloni	Yamaha							20	0
47	(Italy) Alessio Guarnieri	Yamaha	23	DNQ					Ret	0
48	(Portugal) Rodrigo Valente	Yamaha					Ret	25	DNS	0
49	(Greece) Spyros Fourthiotis	Yamaha	26							0
50	(China) Shuai Li	Yamaha	DNQ	DNQ	DNQ	DNQ	DNQ	28	DNQ	0
	(Poland) Mateusz Hulewicz	Yamaha			DNQ					
	(Spain) Aleix Viu	Honda					DNS			
	(South Korea) Kim Jeong Soo	Yamaha						DNS		
	(Italy) Cristian D'Arliano	Yamaha							DNS	
	(Italy) Niccolò Bergamasco	Yamaha					WD			
	(Spain) Yeray Ruiz	Yamaha					WD			
Pos.	Rider	Bike	MIS (San Marino)	EST (Portugal)	CAT (Spain)	POR (Portugal)	JER (Spain)	ARA (Spain)	EST (Portugal)	Points

Colour	Result
Gold	Winner
Silver	Second place
Bronze	Third place
Green	Points classification
Blue	Non-points classification
Blue	Non-classified finish (NC)
Purple	Retired, not classified (Ret)
Red	Did not qualify (DNQ)
Red	Did not pre-qualify (DNPQ)
Black	Disqualified (DSQ)
White	Did not start (DNS)
White	Withdrew (WD)
White	Race cancelled (C)
Blank	Did not practice (DNP)
Blank	Did not arrive (DNA)
Blank	Excluded (EX)

P – Pole position
F – Fastest lap
