= Lorenzo Dalla Porta =

Italian motorcycle racer (born 1997)

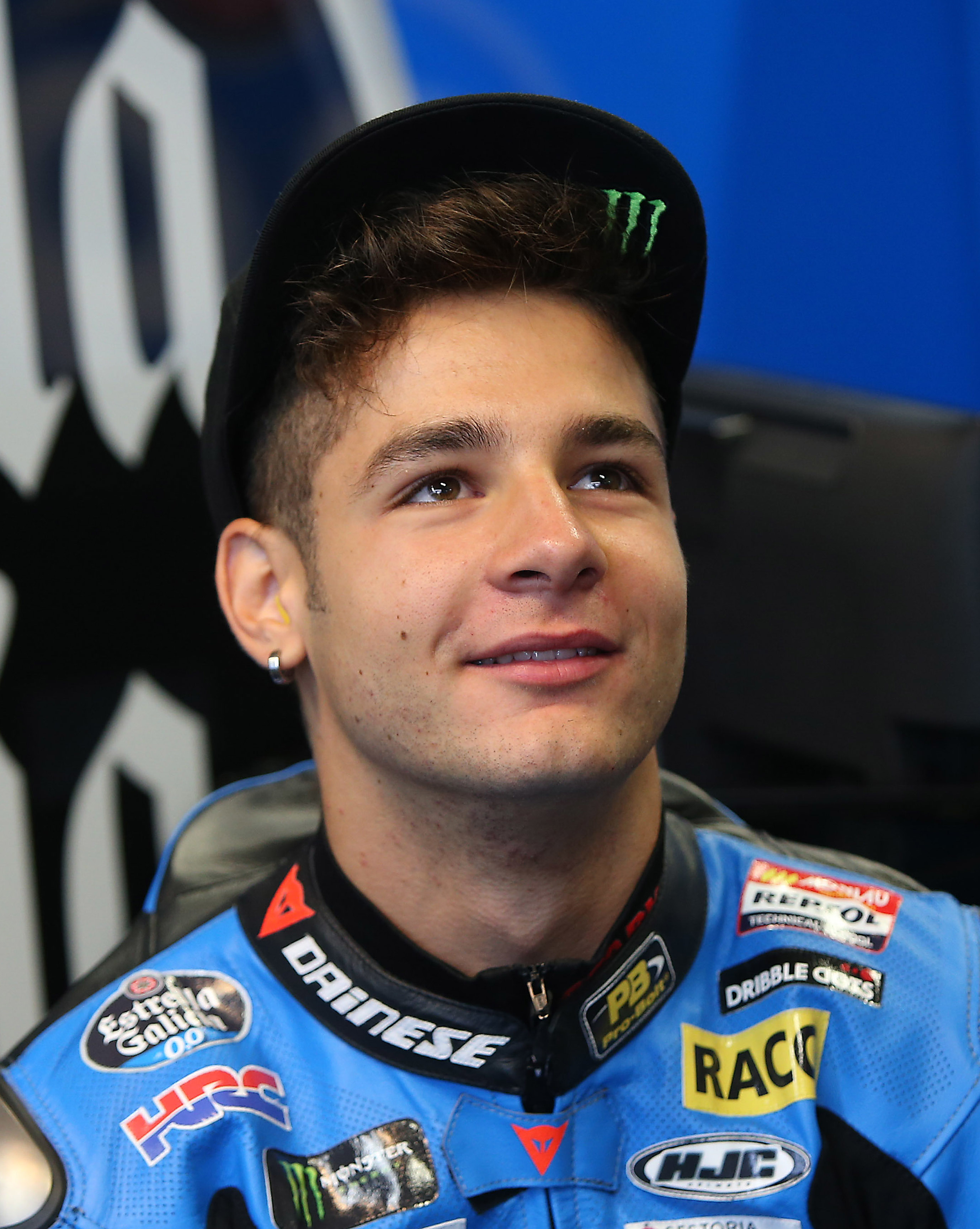
- Dalla Porta in 2016
- Nationality: Italian
- Born: 22 June 1997 (age 29); Prato, Italy
- Current team: Evan Bros. WorldSSP Yamaha Team
- Bike number: 48
Motorcycle racing career statistics
Moto2 World Championship
Active years	2020–2023
Manufacturers	Kalex, Forward
2022 championship position	22nd (21 pts)
Starts / Wins / Podiums / Poles / F. laps / Points; 55 / 0 / 0 / 0 / 0 / 36
Moto3 World Championship
Active years	2015–2019
Manufacturers	Husqvarna (2015); KTM (2016); Honda (2016, 2018–2019); Mahindra (2017)
Championships	1 (2019)
2019 championship position	1st (279 pts)
Starts / Wins / Podiums / Poles / F. laps / Points; 73 / 5 / 16 / 1 / 3 / 464
Supersport World Championship
Active years	2023–
Manufacturers	Yamaha
2024 championship position	28th (9 pts)
Starts / Wins / Podiums / Poles / F. laps / Points; 18 / 0 / 0 / 0 / 0 / 53

Lorenzo Dalla Porta (born 22 June 1997) is an Italian motorcycle racer. He is best known for winning the 2019 Moto3 World Championship, and has also won the FIM CEV Moto3 Junior World Championship in 2016, the CIV 125 GP championship in 2012, and the CIV Supersport Championship in 2026.

== Career ==
=== Moto3 World Championship ===
==== Husqvarna Factory Laglisse (2015) ====
In 2015, Dalla Porta started his Grand Prix career in Moto3 as a replacement rider for Isaac Viñales in the Husqvarna Factory Laglisse team. He scored points twice in nine races, and finished the championship in 25th place with 13 points.

==== Sky Racing Team VR46 (2016) ====
As Husqvarna left the Moto3 championship, and all teams had already signed their riders, Dalla Porta served as a replacement rider. He raced nine times during the season, scoring points three times, 15th place in Mugello, tenth in Assen, and 11th in Motegi.

==== Aspar Team (2017) ====
Dalla Porta joined Aspar Team for 2017, but underperformed on the Mahindra bike, scoring points in only three races all season.

==== Leopard Racing (2018–2019) ====
Despite Dalla Porta finishing 28th in the standings in 2017, he joined Leopard Racing, the team with which Joan Mir won the Moto3 title. Dalla Porta replaced Mir, who moved up to Moto2, and had a much improved season, finishing on the podium five times, including his first win in the class in San Marino, and ended the season fifth in the standings with 151 points.

Dalla Porta became the 2019 Moto3 World Champion, following a fantastic end to his season, in which he won three of the last four races, and secured his title with a win in the Australian GP, held at Phillip Island. He finished his final year in the category with four wins, six second places, and 279 points, beating Arón Canet to the tile with a comfortable 79 point margin.

=== Moto2 World Championship ===
==== Italtrans Racing Team (2020–2022) ====
Dalla Porta has joined the Italtrans Moto2 team for the 2020 season, but struggled massively, scoring points only twice during the season.

The 2021 season was more of the same, as Dalla Porta scored points in only three races.

Finally showing some improvement, Dalla Porta scored points seven times, for a total of 21 in the 2022 season. However, as his best finish was never above 11th, Italtrans Racing Team did not renew his contract for the following season.

==== Pertamina Mandalika SAG Team (2023) ====
From 2023, Dalla Porta raced for Pertamina Mandalika SAG Team, but resigned after just five races. He replaced for Álex Escrig at Forward Racing in Italian and German rounds that season.

=== Supersport World Championship ===
Dalla Porta signed with Evan Bros. World SSP Yamaha Team to replace Andrea Mantovani from Czech Republic round in 2023 season.

== Career statistics ==
=== FIM CEV Moto3 Junior World Championship ===
==== Races by year ====
(key) (Races in bold indicate pole position, races in italics indicate fastest lap)

Year	Bike	1	2	3	4	5	6	7	8	9	10	11	12	Pos	Pts
2015	Husqvarna	ALG; 6	LMS; 5	CAT1; 5	CAT2; 12	ARA1; 5	ARA2; Ret	ALB; Ret	NAV; Ret	JER1; 5	JER2; 3	VAL1; 23	VAL2; 12	9th	78
2016	Husqvarna	**VAL1**; 5	**VAL2**; 3	**LMS**; 1	**ARA**; 3	CAT1; 1	CAT2; 1	**ALB**; 1	**ALG**; 2	JER1; 2	JER2; 8	VAL1; 13	VAL2; 2	1st	214

=== FIM Stock European Championship ===
==== Races by year ====
(key) (Races in bold indicate pole position, races in italics indicate fastest lap)

Year	Bike	Team	1	2	3	4	5	6	7	Pos	Pts
2024	Yamaha	Yamaha GV Racing	**MIS**; 1	EST; 5	**CAT**; 1	POR	JER; 3	ARA; 7	EST; 3	2nd	102
2025	Yamaha	Pitformance VRS	EST; 6	JER	MAG	ARA	MIS	CAT	VAL	22nd	10

=== Grand Prix motorcycle racing ===
==== By season ====
Season	Class	Motorcycle	Team	Race	Win	Podium	Pole	FLap	Pts	Plcd
2015	Moto3	Husqvarna	Husqvarna Factory Laglisse	9	0	0	0	0	13	25th
2016	Moto3	KTM	Schedl GP Racing	9	0	0	0	0	12	30th
2016	Moto3	Honda	Estrella Galicia 0,0	9	0	0	0	0	12	30th
2016	Moto3	KTM	Sky Racing Team VR46	9	0	0	0	0	12	30th
2017	Moto3	Mahindra	Aspar Team	18	0	0	0	0	9	28th
2018	Moto3	Honda	Leopard Racing	18	1	5	0	2	151	5th
2019	Moto3	Honda	Leopard Racing	19	4	11	1	1	279	**1st**
2020	Moto2	Kalex	Italtrans Racing Team	15	0	0	0	0	5	27th
2021	Moto2	Kalex	Italtrans Racing Team	13	0	0	0	0	10	27th
2022	Moto2	Kalex	Italtrans Racing Team	20	0	0	0	0	21	22nd
2023	Moto2	Kalex	Pertamina Mandalika SAG Team	5	0	0	0	0	0	35th
2023	Moto2	Forward	Forward Team	2	0	0	0	0	0	35th
Total				**128**	**5**	**16**	**1**	**3**	**500**	

==== By class ====
Class	Seasons	1st GP	1st Pod	1st Win	Race	Win	Podiums	Pole	FLap	Pts	WChmp
Moto3	2015–2019	2015 Indianapolis	2018 Qatar	2018 San Marino	73	5	16	1	3	464	1
Moto2	2020–2023	2020 Qatar			55	0	0	0	0	36	0
Total	2015–2023				**128**	**5**	**16**	**1**	**3**	**500**	**1**

==== Races by year ====
(key) (Races in bold indicate pole position; races in italics indicate fastest lap)

Year	Class	Bike	1	2	3	4	5	6	7	8	9	10	11	12	13	14	15	16	17	18	19	20	Pos	Pts
2015	Moto3	Husqvarna	QAT	AME	ARG	SPA	FRA	ITA	CAT	NED	GER	INP; 28	CZE; 19	GBR; 8	RSM; 11	ARA; 24	JPN; 24	AUS; Ret	MAL; 16	VAL; 22			25th	13
2016	Moto3	KTM	QAT	ARG	AME	SPA	FRA	ITA; 15	CAT					GBR; 18	RSM; 17	ARA; 25	JPN; 11	AUS; 19	MAL; 16	VAL; Ret			30th	12
2016	Moto3	Honda								NED; 10	GER	AUT	CZE										30th	12
2017	Moto3	Mahindra	QAT; 23	ARG; Ret	AME; 26	SPA; 19	FRA; 14	ITA; 19	CAT; 19	NED; Ret	GER; 19	CZE; 19	AUT; Ret	GBR; 17	RSM; 15	ARA; Ret	JPN; Ret	AUS; 10	MAL; Ret	VAL; 20			28th	9
2018	Moto3	Honda	QAT; 3	ARG; 7	AME; 18	SPA; Ret	FRA; Ret	ITA; 8	CAT; 17	NED; 6	GER; 13	CZE; 10	AUT; 5	GBR; C	RSM; 1	ARA; 13	THA; 2	JPN; 2	AUS; Ret	MAL; 2	VAL; 18		5th	151
2019	Moto3	Honda	QAT; 2	ARG; 7	AME; 13	**SPA**; 8	FRA; 2	ITA; 2	CAT; Ret	NED; 2	GER; 1	CZE; 2	AUT; 6	GBR; 3	RSM; 8	ARA; 11	THA; 2	JPN; 1	AUS; 1	MAL; 1	VAL; 21		1st	279
2020	Moto2	Kalex	QAT; 24	SPA; 19	ANC; Ret	CZE; 24	AUT; 19	STY; 17	RSM; 13	EMI; 14	CAT; Ret	FRA; 18	ARA; 17	TER; 18	EUR; 20	VAL; Ret	POR; 17						27th	5
2021	Moto2	Kalex	QAT; 18	DOH; 14	POR; 12	SPA; 16	FRA; DSQ	ITA; Ret	CAT; Ret	GER; Ret	NED; Ret	STY; 12	AUT; Ret	GBR; DNS	ARA; Ret	RSM; Ret	AME	EMI	ALR	VAL			27th	10
2022	Moto2	Kalex	QAT; Ret	INA; 20	ARG; Ret	AME; 16	POR; Ret	SPA; 15	FRA; 12	ITA; Ret	CAT; 11	GER; Ret	NED; 16	GBR; 17	AUT; Ret	RSM; Ret	ARA; 12	JPN; 15	THA; Ret	AUS; Ret	MAL; 12	VAL; 14	22nd	21
2023	Moto2	Kalex	POR; 19	ARG; 23	AME; Ret	SPA; 25	FRA; 21																35th	0
2023	Moto2	Forward						ITA; 20	GER; Ret	NED	GBR	AUT	CAT	RSM	IND	JPN	INA	AUS	THA	MAL	QAT	VAL	35th	0

=== Supersport World Championship ===
==== Races by year ====
(key) (Races in bold indicate pole position, races in italics indicate fastest lap)

Year	Bike	1		2		3		4		5		6		7		8		9		10		11		12		Pos	Pts
Year	Bike	R1	R2	R1	R2	R1	R2	R1	R2	R1	R2	R1	R2	R1	R2	R1	R2	R1	R2	R1	R2	R1	R2	R1	R2	Pos	Pts
2023	Yamaha	AUS	AUS	INA	INA	NED	NED	SPA	SPA	EMI	EMI	GBR	GBR	ITA	ITA	CZE; 20	CZE; 19	FRA; 10	FRA; 6	SPA; 16	SPA; Ret	POR; 10	POR; 9	SPA; 8	SPA; 9	17th	44
2024	Yamaha	AUS	AUS	SPA; 15	SPA; 14	NED	NED	ITA	ITA	GBR	GBR	CZE	CZE	POR; 19	POR; 14	FRA; 12	FRA; 20	ITA; 16	ITA; 21	SPA	SPA	POR	POR	SPA	SPA	28th	9
