= 2027 in Spain =

- Decades: 2000s; 2010s; 2020s; 2030s
- See also: History of Spain; Timeline of Spanish history; List of years in Spain

Events in the year 2027 in Spain.

== Events ==
=== Predicted and scheduled events ===
- 23 May
  - 2027 Spanish local elections
  - 2027 Spanish regional elections
- 5 June – 2027 UEFA Champions League final in Madrid
- 2 August – Solar eclipse of August 2, 2027 (total eclipse)

== Holidays ==
- 1 January – New Year's Day
- 6 January – Epiphany
- 25 March – Maundy Thursday
- 26 March – Good Friday
- 29 March – Easter Monday
- 1 May – International Workers' Day
- 15 August – Assumption Day
- 12 October – National Day of Spain
- 1 November – All Saints' Day
- 6 December – Constitution Day
- 25 December – Christmas Day

== See also ==
- 2027 in Europe
- 2027 in the European Union
- 2027 in Spanish television
