= José Luis Alonso Coomonte =

Spanish sculptor (1932–2025)

- Born: 1932; Benavente, Zamora, Spain
- Died: 4 December 2025 (aged 93)
- Known for: Sculpture

José Luis Alonso Coomonte (1932 – 4 December 2025), also known as Josepito, was a Spanish sculptor and academic.

== Life and career ==
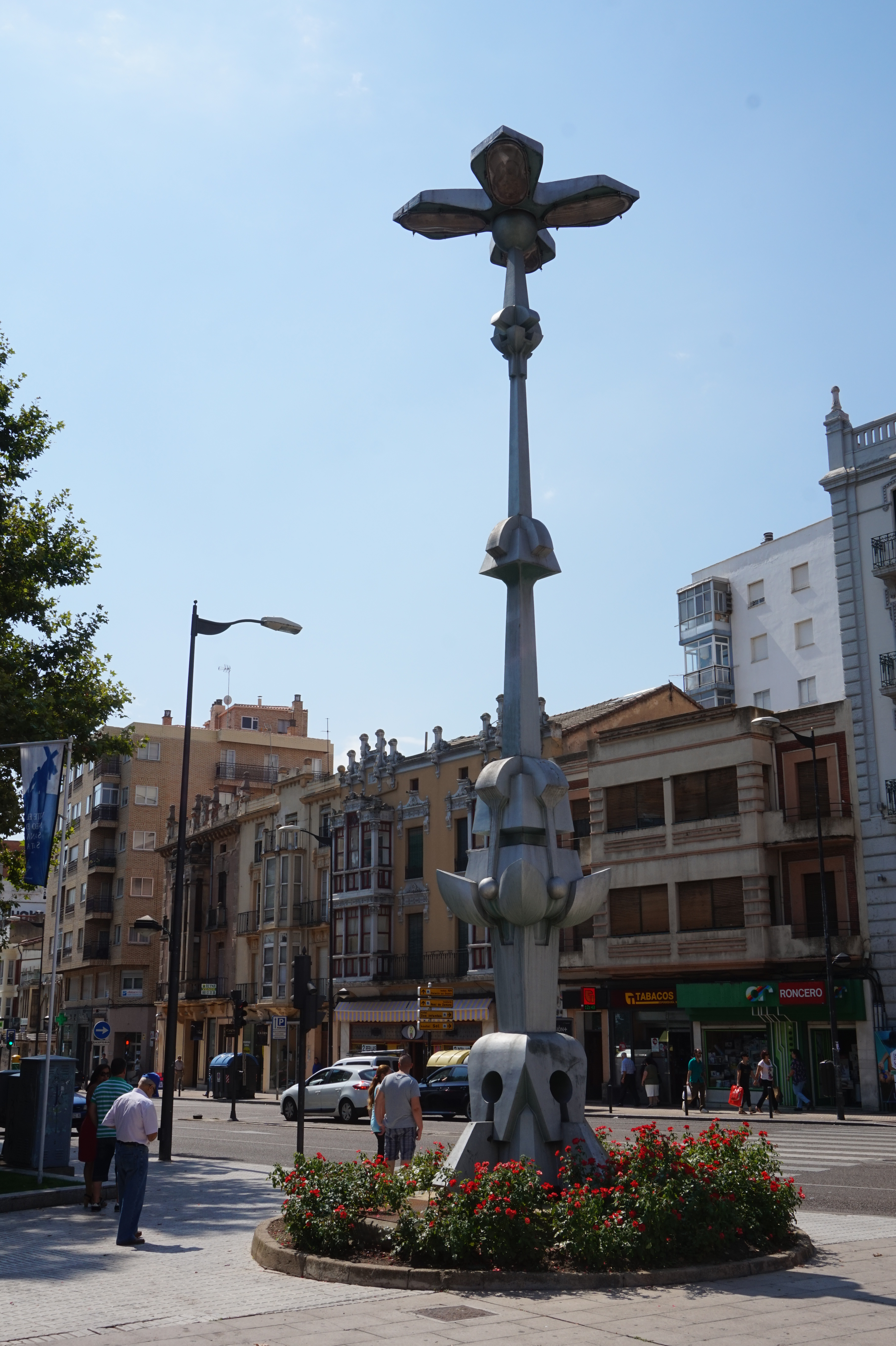
Lamp post designed by Coomonte in Zamora

Alonso Coomonte was born in Benavente in 1932. He studied at the Academy of Fine Arts of San Fernando between 1950 and 1954, and after obtaining a scholarship to extend his sculpture studies in Segovia he moved to Paris. He earned his Doctorate of Arts from the University of Salamanca.

As a sculptor, he worked with different materials including wood, concrete, stone, wrought iron and glass. His early work is essentially figurative marked as sacred art, but his creative impulse leads him to evolve coexisting with cubism, works such as Discobolus (1961) or Tightrope Walkers (1955), both constructed using iron, with abstraction in the work Dynamic Form (1964) in which he already investigates with polyester.

Notable works include a Fountain, located in the Garden of the Parque de las Naciones in Madrid, constructed in 1965. In Zamora, there is a tourist route of contemporary art that highlights the sculptures of Alonso Coomonte.

Alonso Coomonte died on 4 December 2025, at the age of 93.
