= Antonio Masa Godoy =

Spanish politician (1942–2025)

Antonio Masa Godoy (14 January 1942 – 30 August 2025) was a Spanish businessman and politician.

== Life and career ==
Masa Godoy was president of the Spanish Confederation of Small and Medium-sized Enterprises, as well as vice-president of the Spanish Confederation of Employer's Organizations (1998). He was the founder and president of the Caja Rural de Badajoz (1972–1984); professor of Economic Theory at the University of Extremadura; and deputy for the Union of the Democratic Centre in the constituent legislation of the Congress of Deputies representing the constituency of Badajoz (1977–1979).

Masa Godoy died 30 August 2025, at the age of 83.
