= Julián Riera =

Spanish footballer (1940–2025)

Julián Riera Navarro (15 September 1940 – 8 August 2025) was a Spanish footballer who played as a defender.

== Career ==
Riera began his professional career in 1961, playing with Espanyol until 1970. From 1970 to 1973 he played for UE Sant Andreu.

== Death ==
Riera died in Barcelona on 8 August 2025, at the age of 84.
