= Manuel Gausa =

Spanish architect (1959–2025)

Manuel Gausa Navarro (14 March 1959 – 23 August 2025) was a Catalan architect.

== Life and work ==
Gausa was born in Barcelona on 14 March 1959. He graduated as an architect in 1986 at the Polytechnic University of Catalonia (ETSAB), obtaining a doctorate in 2005 from the same university.

In 1994 he was a founding partner of the firm Actar Arquitectura, dedicated to architecture and urbanism. In 2004 he founded Gausa+Raveau actarchitecture with Florence Raveau.

Between 1991 and 2000 he was the director of the magazine Quaderns d'Arquitectura i Urbanisme, a publication of the College of Architects of Catalonia.

As a teacher, he taught at ETSAB, and since 2008 he was a full professor at the School of Architecture of Genoa.

He received several awards, including the Medal of the Académie de Architecture of France in 2000.

Gausa died on 23 August 2025, at the age of 66.
