= Vicente Sanchís =

Spanish basketball referee (1947–2025)

Vicente Sanchís Rosique (13 October 1947 – 3 September 2025) was a Spanish basketball referee.

== Biography ==
Rosique was born in Barcelona on 13 October 1947. He had worked as a referee for FIBA international since 1984 and was known as one of the historical references of refereeing in Spain. He officiated matches at the Olympic Games, World Cups, EuroBaskets and European club competitions.

In 2023 he was inducted into the Spanish Basketball Hall of Fame.

Sanchís died in Santiago de Compostela on 3 September 2025, at the age of 77.
