= Mario Busquets Jordá =

Spanish Roman Catholic prelate (1935–2025)

The Most Reverend Mario Busquets Jordá
- Bishop Emeritus of Chuquibamba
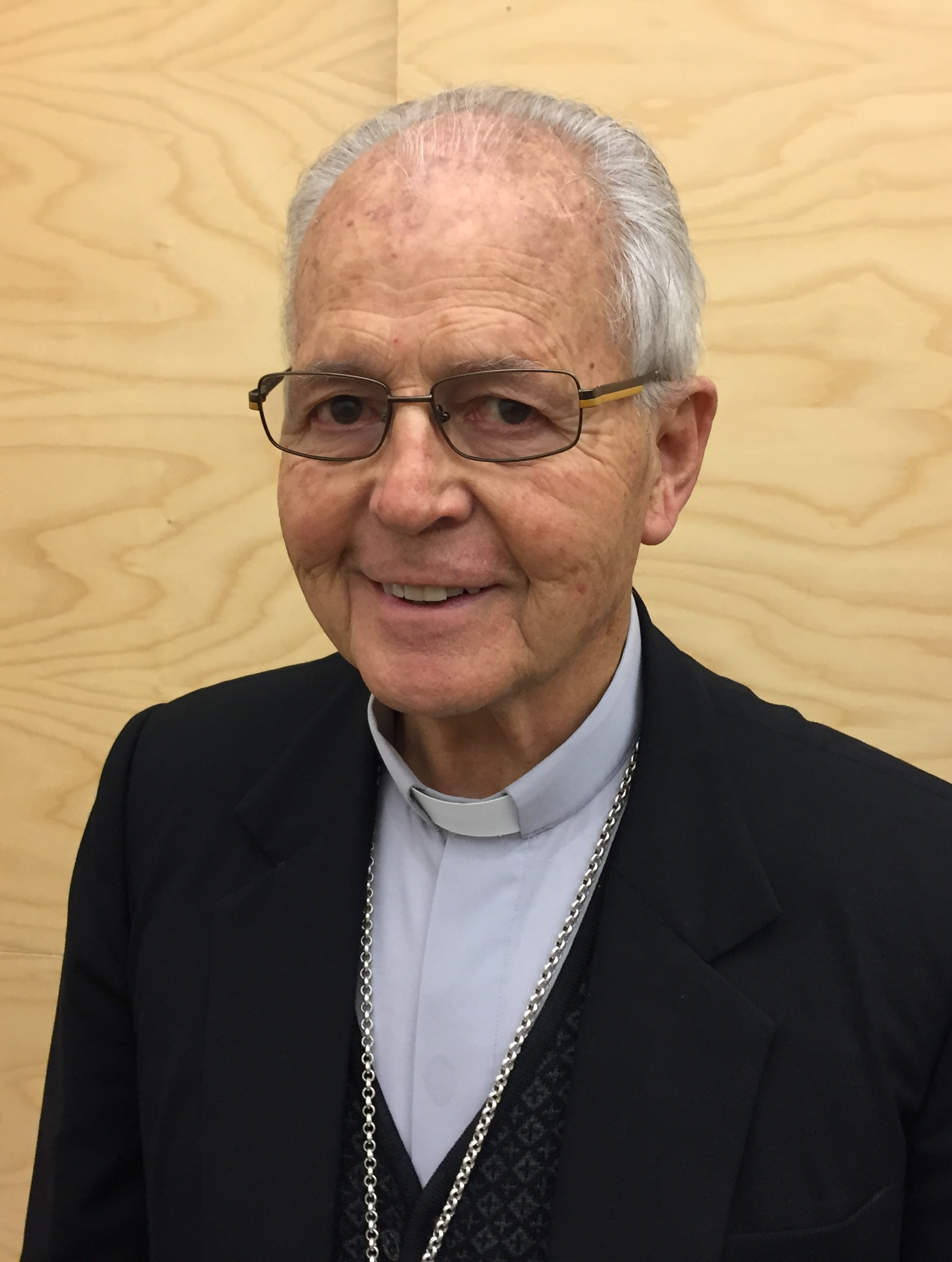
- Archdiocese: Arequipa
- Appointed: 25 January 2001
- Term ended: 11 May 2015
- Predecessor: Felipe María Zalba Elizalde
- Successor: Jorge Enrique Izaguirre Rafael

Orders
- Ordination: 19 March 1958
- Consecration: 24 March 2001 by Luis Sánchez-Moreno Lira, Rino Passigato, Juan Antonio Ugarte Pérez

Personal details
- Born: 3 March 1935 Vilobí d'Onyar, Spain
- Died: 5 December 2025 (aged 90) San Vicente de Cañete, Peru
- Motto: Evangelizare Jesum Christum
- Coat of arms

Styles of Mario Busquets Jordá
- Reference style: His Excellency; The Most Reverend
- Spoken style: Your Excellency
- Religious style: Bishop

Mario Busquets Jordá (3 March 1935 – 5 December 2025) was a Spanish Roman Catholic prelate.

Busquets Jordá was born in Vilobí d'Onyar, Girona, Catalonia, on 3 March 1935. He was ordained a priest for the Diocese of Girona on 19 March 1958 by Bishop Josep Cartañà Inglés. During these years, in which he exercised his pastoral ministry in Spain and then in Peru, on 5 August 1998, Pope John Paul II granted him the honorary title of Prelate of Honor of His Holiness.

On 25 January 2001, he was appointed by Pope John Paul II as the bishop of the Territorial Prelature of Chuquibamba. On 11 May 2015, he presented to Pope Francis his resignation at the age of 75.

Busquets Jordá died on 5 December 2025 at the age of 90.

Catholic Church titles
Preceded by Felipe María Zalba Elizalde	Prelate of Chuquibamba; 2001–2015	Succeeded by Jorge Enrique Izaguirre Rafael
