= José María Saponi =

Spanish politician (1938–2025)

José María Saponi Mendo (Spanish: [xoˈse maˈɾia saˈponi ˈmendo]; 19 June 1938 – 14 August 2025) was a Spanish politician.

== Life and career ==
Saponi was born in Cáceres, Spain on 19 June 1938. A law graduate and career civil servant, he was mayor of Cáceres between 1995 and 2007, as a member of the People's Party.

Saponi died on 14 August 2025, at the age of 87. Cáceres declared three days of mourning.
