= Jorge Ilegal =

Spanish musician (1955–2025)

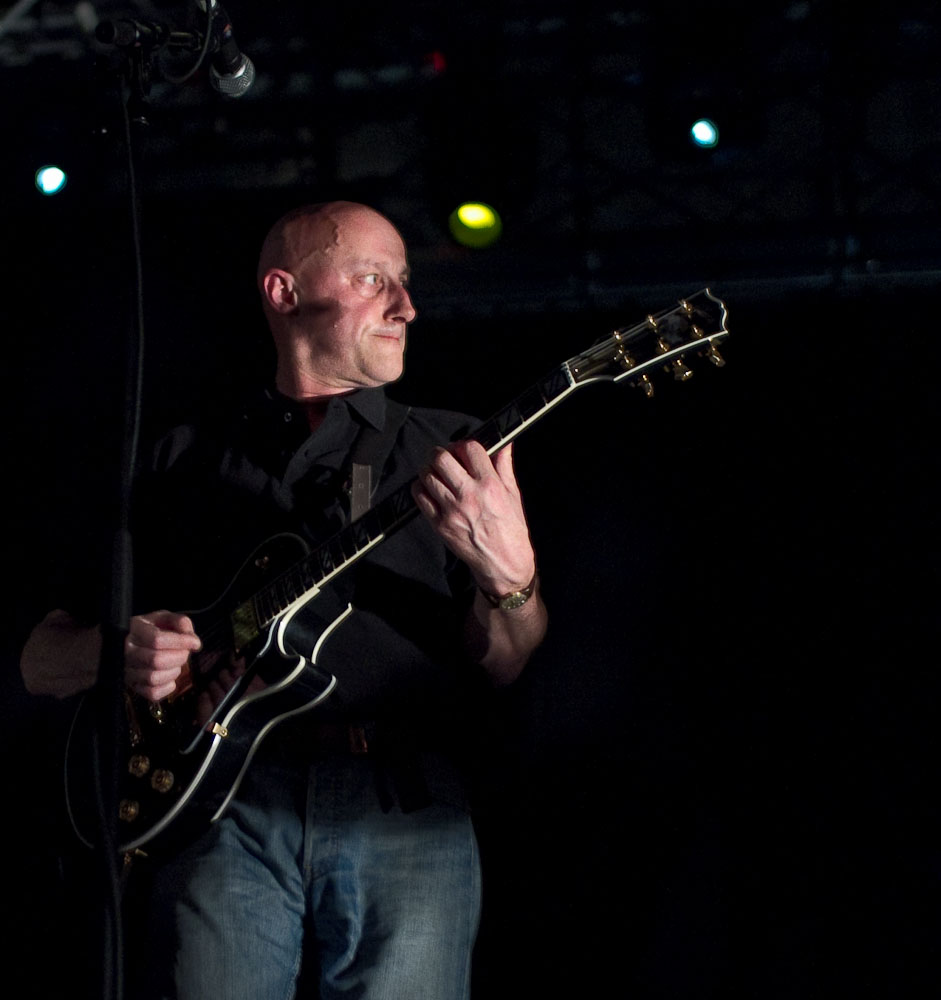
Jorge Ilegal in 2010

Jorge María Martínez García (1 May 1955 – 9 December 2025), better known as Jorge Ilegal, was a Spanish musician, composer and singer.

== Life and career ==
Martínez was born 1 May 1955 in Avilés, a descendent of Pedro Menéndez de Avilés. In his early career, he played in popular music orchestras, such as Manolo Carrizo and his Conjunto, in venues, dances and festivals. In 1976, he obtained the professional musician's card issued by the National Entertainment Union during the Franco regime. He began his law degree at the University of Oviedo, although he abandoned it before finishing it, at the age of 21, to devote himself to music.

He was part of the rock band Madson, formed in the 1970s in which his brother, Juan Martínez, also played. Later, he was in another group, Los Metálicos. In 1982, he founded the rock group Ilegales, for which he was known as Jorge Ilegal, and with which he released more than a dozen albums and performed in countries around the world. In 1985, Martínez became a producer with Discóbolo Records, under which he produced works by Ilegales such as Todos están muertos.

In 2011, after the dissolution of Ilegales, Martínez founded the group Jorge Ilegal y los Magníficos, with which he performed other musical styles such as boleros, joropos, chachachá, tango, guarachas, ballads and twist.

Later, Martínez founded another record label, La Casa del Misterio, which in addition to producing the works of his bands Ilegales or Jorge Ilegal y los Magníficos, also made productions of other rock artists such as Gestido, Fe de Ratas and UHP.

In September 2025, he had to cancel the tour to present the album Joven y arrogante, after being diagnosed with pancreatic cancer. He died on 9 December 2025, at the age of 70.
