= Enric Mestre =

Spanish ceramist, sculptor and painter (1936–2026)

Enric Mestre Estellés
- Born: 16 March 1936; Alboraya, Valencia, Spain
- Died: 31 December 2025 (aged 89); Alboraya, Valencia, Spain
- Occupations: Ceramist, sculptor, painter

Enric Mestre Estellés (16 March 1936 – 31 December 2025) was a Spanish ceramist, sculptor and painter.

== Life and career ==
Mestre was born in Alboraya, Valencia on 16 March 1936. He was a student of Alfonso Blat, from whom he learned the virtuosity of glazing, and a constant and rigorous field of technical research throughout his career. In 1958 he obtained the title of drawing teacher from the San Carlos School, in 1970 he graduated as an artistic ceramic expert and in 1972 he graduated in Applied Arts, in the Specialty of Ceramics at the School of Applied Arts of Valencia. He finally graduated with a degree in Fine Arts from the San Carlos Faculty of Fine Arts in Valencia in 1982. He dedicated more than 32 years of her professional career to teaching.

He began exhibiting in 1964, and his work has been shown in Spain, Germany, Switzerland, England, France, Denmark, and Japan. He is considered a pioneer thanks to Alfons Blat, who opened his eyes to the possibilities of contemporary ceramics, he declared in 2009.

In 1979 he was appointed a Member of the International Academy of Ceramics and in 1983 he was appointed a Full Member of the Royal Academy of Fine Arts of San Carlos of Valencia. The University of Valencia granted him a scholarship in 1964 at the Lycée Technique Henry Brisson in Vierzon to carry out studies on high-temperature artistic glazes.

Mestre died in Alboraya on 31 December 2025, at the age of 89.

== Exhibitions ==
- 1964 – Nebli Gallery, Madrid.
- 1970 – Ceramics Fair, Copenhagen.
- 1971 – Amadís Gallery, Madrid.
- 1972 – Sarrió Gallery, Barcelona.
- 1973 – Val i Trenta Gallery, Valencia.
- 1975 – Ponce Gallery, Madrid.
- 1979 – Ática Gallery, Barcelona.
- 1980 – Maho Gallery, Japan.
- 1982 – Sargadelos Gallery, Madrid.
- 1985 – Barcelona Ceramics Museum.
- 1987 – Punto Gallery, Valencia.
- 1989 – Hetjens Museum, Düsseldorf.
- 1991 – Leonelli Gallery, Lausanne. Ceramics Museum, Barcelona.
- 1994 – Musikhuset Aarhus, Denmark. Norby Gallery, Copenhagen.
- 1996 – Norby Gallery, Copenhagen.
- 1997 – Kunsthalle Wil, Switzerland.
- 1999 – Sala Parpalló, Valencia.
- 1999 – Eléna Ortillés-Fourcat Gallery, Paris.
- 2000 – Lappeenranta K’2000 Etelä-Karjalan Taidemuseum. South Karelia Art Museum Lappeenranta
- 2001 – Gallery i Leonarte, Valencia.
- 2002 – Besson Gallery, London. Kunstforum Gallery, Kirchberg.
- 2004 – Vromans Gallery, Amsterdam. Kunstforum Gallery, Solothurn.
- 2005 – B15 Gallery, Munich.
- 2009 – Kunstforum Gallery, Solothurm. Leonarte Gallery, Valencia.
- 2013 – Between intuition, geometry and mystery. L'Almudí, Valencia.

== Awards ==
- 1972 First Prize, Manises National Ceramics Competition.
- 1972 National Prize, Industrial Design Competition, Valencia Ceramics Fair.
- 1976 Gold Medal of the State of Bavaria
- 1982 First Prize, Calvià National Ceramics Competition.
- 1999 Alfons Roig Izquierdo Prize, Valencia Provincial Council.
- 2009 Valencian Government Prize for Visual Arts.
