= Javier Cid =

Spanish journalist (1979–2025)

Javier Cid (1979 – 22 August 2025) was a Spanish journalist, writer and LGBT rights activist.

== Life and career ==
Cid was born in Zamora in 1979. At the time of his death he was a journalist for El Mundo, where he had begun his career, and was the head of its local magazine Gran Madrid. He had also worked at Unidad Editorial on the magazines YoDona and Telva.

In 2010, he released his first novel Diario de Martín Lobo, which was followed by Llamarás un domingo por la tarde in 2019.

In 2019, he was awarded the Alan Turing Award in the media category at the ARN Culture & Business Pride festival in Arona, for his defense of the rights of the LGTBIQ+ community.

Cid died at his home in Madrid, on 22 August 2025, at the age of 46.
