= Redento Maria Gauci =

Maltese Catholic prelate (1920–1978)

His Excellency Redent Maria Gauci O.Carm.
- Prelate of Chuquibamba
- Church: Roman Catholic
- See: Chuquibamba
- Appointed: 5 June 1962
- In office: 1962-1977

Orders
- Ordination: 1 August 1943 by Emanuel Galea
- Consecration: 30 April 1967 by Mikiel Gonzi
- Rank: Bishop

Personal details
- Born: 27 December 1920 Valletta, Malta
- Died: 10 February 1978 (aged 57) Malta
- Buried: Santa Maria Addolorata Cemetery in Paola, Malta

Redento Maria Gauci, O. Carm. (27 December 1920 – 10 February 1978) was a Maltese Carmelite bishop who became the Prelate of Chuquibamba in Peru.

Gauci was born in Valletta Malta on 27 December 1920. In 1943 he was ordained a priest of the Order of Our Lady of Mount Carmel by Bishop Emanuel Galea. Gauci was one of the founders of the community in Fgura Malta where they established a church dedicated to Our Lady of Mount Carmel which later eventually became a parish in 1965. In 1949 Father Gauci left for Peru with another Carmelite priest. They became the first Maltese Carmelite missionaries in Latin America. In 1962 he was appointed the first Prelate of the Territorial Prelature of Chuquibamba in Peru. He was consecrated bishop by Archbishop Mikiel Gonzi of Malta. Gauci participated, as a council father, in all four of the Second Vatican Council sessions. In 1967 he was given the titular see of Ida in Mauretania. He resigned as Prelate of Chuquibamba in 1977 due to ill health and traveled back to Malta and died a year later on 10 February 1978 at the age of 57.
