= Martutene =

Coordinates: 43.2947°N 1.9550°W

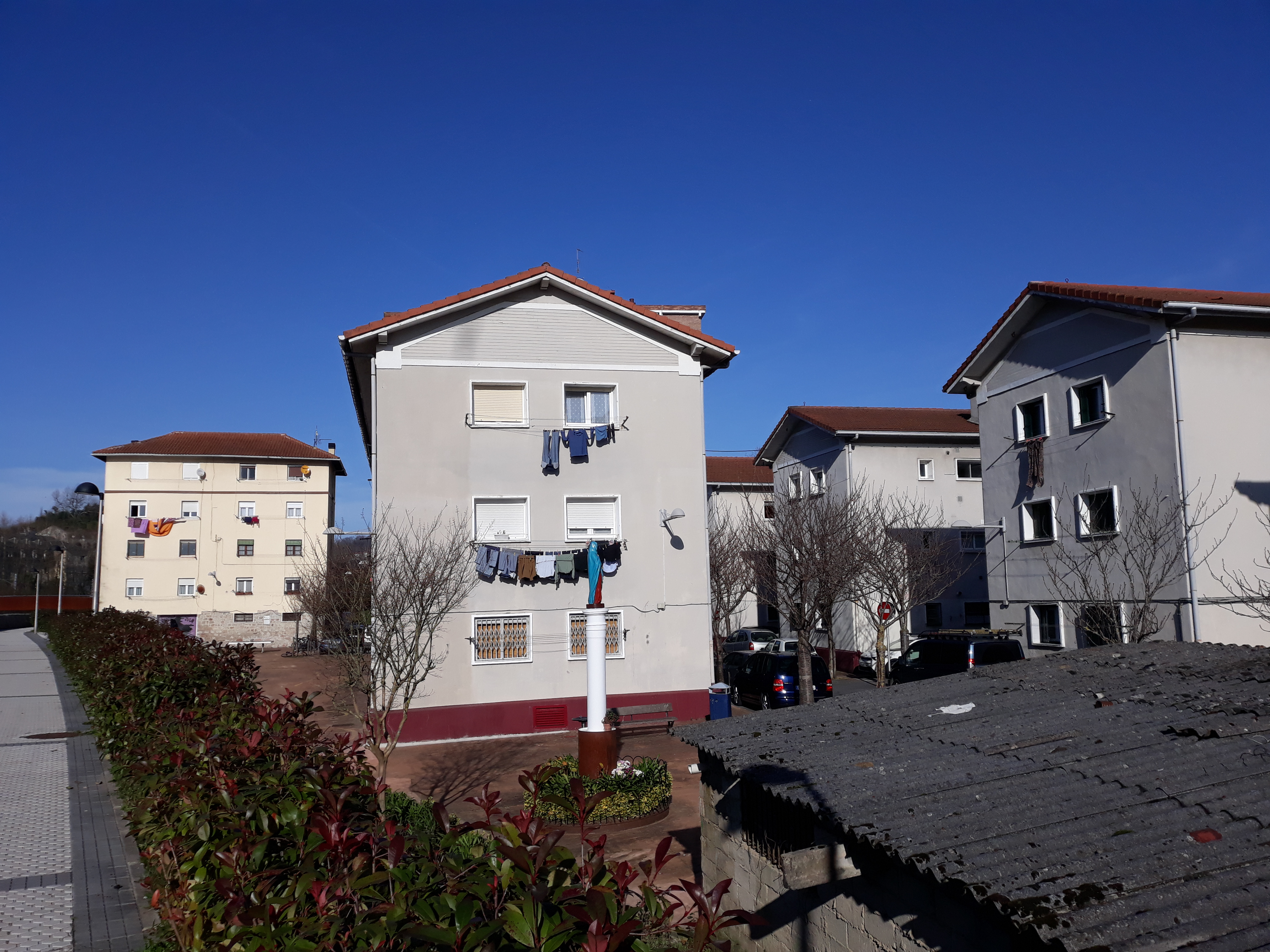
Martutene

Martutene is a neighbourhood situated south of Donostia-San Sebastián, Guipúzcoa (Spain) on the banks of the river Urumea, between the neighbourhoods of Loiola, and the village of Astigarraga. In this neighbourhood, are located an industrial area, a football pitch for lower leagues, a disused vocational training building, and a prison that carries its name, Prison of Martutene.
