= Víctor Terradellas Maré =

Spanish businessman (1962–2025)

- Maré in 2011
- Born: Reus, Spain
- Died: August 30, 2025 (aged 62–63); Reus
- Occupations: Businessman, editor, and social activist
- Known for: Businessman and cultural and political activist
- Political party: Democratic Convergence of Catalonia

Víctor Terradellas Maré (1962 – 30 August 2025) was a Spanish businessman and cultural and political activist.

== Life and career ==
Maré was president of the CATmón Foundation, and promoter of the "Platform for Sovereignty" (constituted in 2007) he was editor of the magazines Catalan International View and ONGC. In 2011 he was appointed secretary of international relations of the Democratic Convergence of Catalonia (CDC). He was arrested in May 2018 accused of being involved in the diversion of funds from the Provincial Council of Barcelona to the entity he directed. During that investigation, he was accused of maintaining contacts with the Kremlin, whose envoys had allegedly offered military and economic support to the Catalan state, but the case was dismissed.

A Catalan independentist, he defended an unreserved strategic alliance between Catalonia and Israel. He advocated the need for a potential independent Catalonia to have a military. He was one of the signatories in October 2017 of the manifesto entitled For the Catalan Republic, we lift the suspension of the Declaration of Independence, which urged not to heed the request of the Government of Spain, prior to the activation of Article 155 of the Spanish Constitution in Catalonia.

On 28 August 2025, he suffered a stroke. He died two days later, on 30 August, at the age of 62.
