= José María Sánchez Silva (military officer) =

Spanish military officer (1951–2025)

José María Sánchez Silva (1951 – 25 August 2025) was a Spanish military officer.

== Biography ==
Sánchez Silva was born in 1951. In 2000, he received media attention when, as a lieutenant colonel, he publicly expressed his sexuality as gay.

After a period in which he was involved in complaints and claims of discrimination against gay people (for example, by being identified as a risk group for the purposes of blood donations), he ended up leaving active service in the Spanish Army, feeling professionally relegated.

Sánchez Silva died on 25 August 2025, at the age of 74.
