= José Antonio Marín Rite =

Spanish politician (1941–2025)

José Antonio Marín Rite (Spanish: [xoˈse anˈtonjo maˈɾin ˈrite]; 29 June 1941 – 13 August 2025) was a Spanish lawyer and politician.

== Life and career ==
Marín studied law at the Community of Madrid, returning to the province of Huelva and working as a lawyer for the UGT (General Union of Workers) and the PSOE (Spanish Socialist Workers' Party), a position he held both in Seville and in Huelva.

He was elected mayor of the city of Huelva, a position he held from 1979 to 1988, and in the same year president of the Parliament of Andalusia, a position he held until 1994. In 1982 he was elected deputy of the Andalusian chamber for Huelva, a position he held until 2004, and in the legislature from 1996 to 1988 he was elected first president of the Andalusian Federation of Municipalities and Provinces.

He was also a Senator in the Spanish Senate by appointment of Parliament, between 1986 and 1988 and, later, from 1994 to 1996, and in the upper house he was spokesman for the Spanish Socialist Workers' Party in the Justice Commission, and in 2005 he chaired the Port Authority of Huelva.

Marín Rite died on 13 August 2025, at the age of 84.

== Honors ==
- Order of Saint Raymond of Peñafort (1996)
