= Territorial Prelature of Chuquibamba =

Roman Catholic territorial prelature in Peru

Territorial Prelature of Chuquibamba Praelatura Territorialis Chuquibambensis Prelatura Territorial de Chuquibamba

Catholic

Location
- Country: Peru
- Metropolitan: Archdiocese of Arequipa
- Headquarters: Camaná, Camaná province, Peru

Statistics
- Area: 22,151 km^{2} (8,553 sq mi)
- Population: Total; Catholics: (as of 2024); 133,237; 120,221 (90.2%)
- Parishes: 23

Information
- Denomination: Catholic Church
- Sui iuris church: Latin Church
- Rite: Roman Rite
- Established: 5 June 1962; 64 years ago
- Cathedral: Catedral de San Miguel Arcángel in Camaná
- Secular priests: 25 (20 Diocesan, 5 Religious Orders)

Current leadership
- Pope: Leo XIV
- Prelate: Juan Carlos Asqui Pilco
- Metropolitan Archbishop: Javier del Río Alba

Map

The Territorial Prelature of Chuquibamba (Latin: Praelatura Territorialis Chuquibambensis) is a Roman Catholic territorial prelature located in the city of Chuquibamba in the ecclesiastical province of Arequipa in Peru.

== History ==
- 5 June 1962: The Territorial Prelature of Chuquibamba was established from parts of the existing Archdiocese of Arequipa and Territorial Prelature of Caravelí.

== Leadership ==
=== Prelates of Chuquibamba ===
- Redento Maria Gauci, O. Carm. (5 June 1962 – February 1977), resigned
- Luis Baldo Riva, C.Ss.R. (27 June 1977 – 27 June 1983)
- Felipe María Zalba Elizalde, O.P. (29 February 1984 – 19 October 1999)
- Mario Busquets Jordá (25 January 2001 – 11 May 2015), retired
- Jorge Enrique Izaguirre Rafael, C.S.C. (11 May 2015 – 27 December 2023), appointed Bishop of Chosica
  - Apostolic Administrator Juan Carlos Asqui Pilco (9 February 2024 – 12 December 2025), Auxiliary Bishop of Tacna y Moquegua
- Juan Carlos Asqui Pilco (12 December 2025 – Present)

== Sources ==
- GCatholic.org
- Catholic Hierarchy
