= Arantza Arruti =

Spanish politician and ETA member (1946–2025)

Arantza Arruti Odriozola (1946 – 29 August 2025) was a Spanish Basque politician who was a member of ETA.

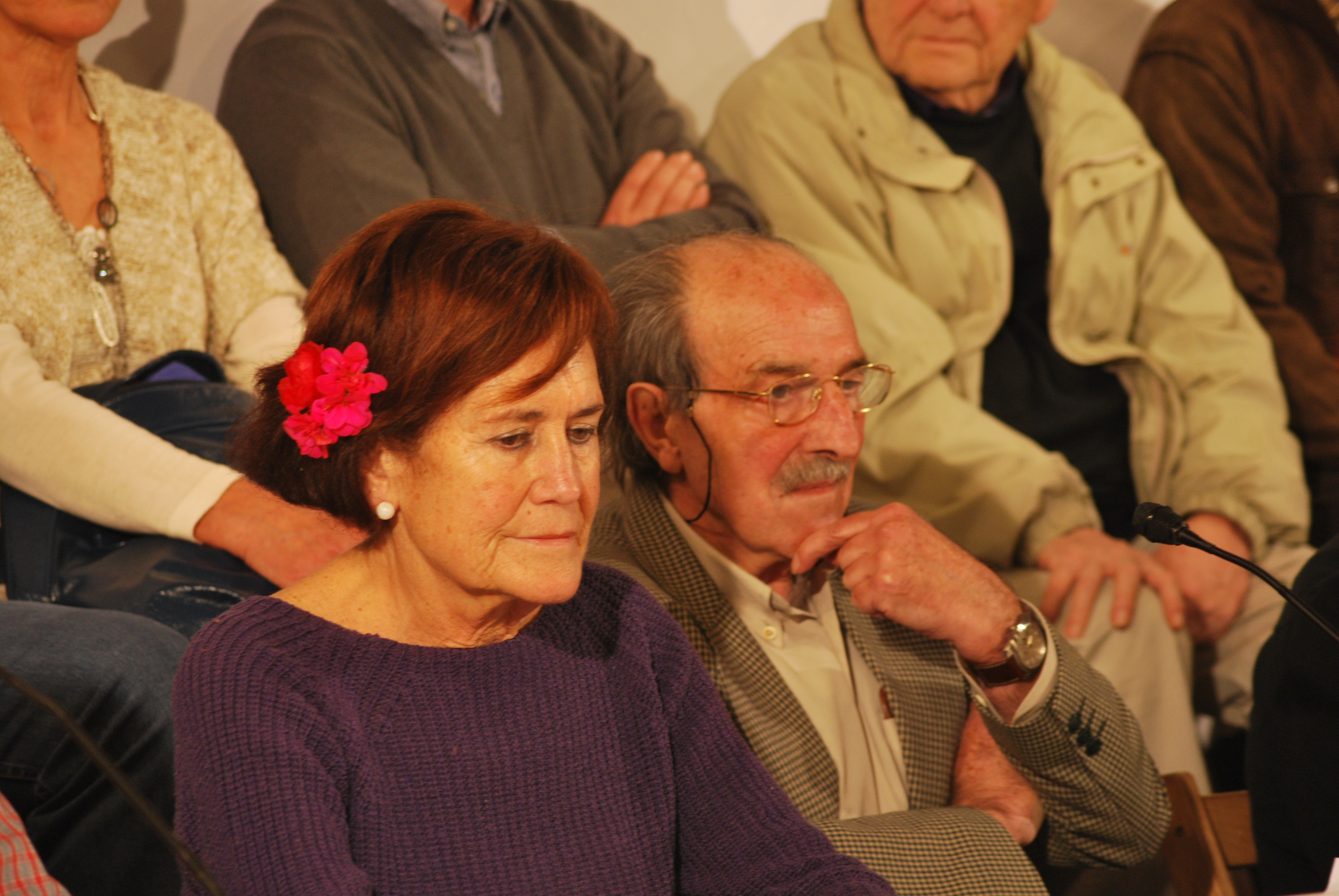
Arantza Arruti and Txomin Ziluaga

== Life and career ==
Arruti decided to join ETA at the age of 19 with the aim of confronting the "oppression and repression" of the time. She was arrested for the first time at the age of 20 in Tolosa. After several months in pre-trial detention in Martutene prison, she was released and fled.

As a member of ETA, she was responsible for Navarre. She was captured in a raid, on 10 November 1968, in Pamplona, along with her husband and companion Gregorio López Irasuegi. At the time of her arrest, she was pregnant and lost her baby due to the torture she suffered. The police did not suspect Gregorio, so shortly afterwards they released him. Later, on 5 January 1969, Gregorio and his companion Xabier Izko de la Iglesia tried to free Arruti from prison, but the operation went wrong and they were arrested.

When she learned that Gregorio was going to be released from prison by the amnesty of 1977, she went to look for him in Puerto de Santa María. On 17 September 1977, when she was in a bar in Chiclana de la Frontera waiting for her husband's release, two civil guards entered the bar. Apparently, someone from the bar alerted the police (possibly the tavern keeper himself). She was arrested after an argument with the police, who entered, under the complaint of "mockery" of the police. She was admitted to the prison of Jerez de la Frontera.

She was released on 14 December 1977. She continued to work in politics and feminism within the Basque nationalist left. In the 1980s, she participated directly in the process of creating several feminist groups, including Aizan and KAS Mujeres.

In 1998, she stood for election to the Basque Parliament in the Euskal Herritarrok party. She was also a candidate for Euskal Herria Bildu in the 2015 Spanish general election.

Arruti died in Zarautz on 29 August 2025, at the age of 79.
