= Maria Trayner =

Spanish social activist (1936–2025)

Maria Pau Trayner Vilanova (2 March 1936 – 16 December 2025) was a Spanish social activist.

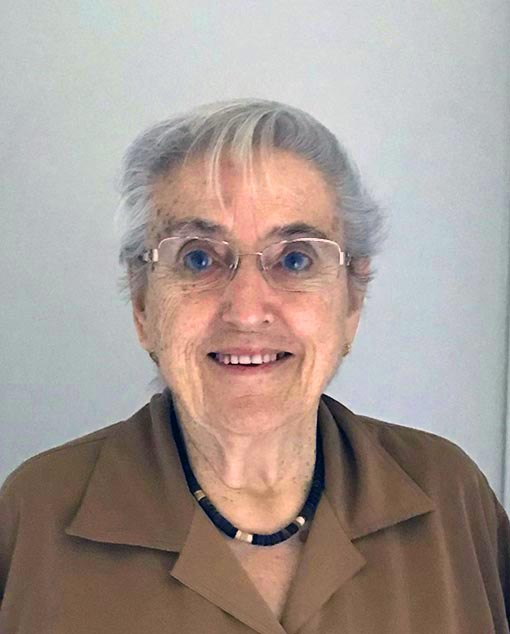
Maria Pau Trayner

== Life and career ==
Trayner was born in Vendrell on 2 March 1936. In 1957, she entered the Institute of the Daughters of Mary Religious of the Pious Schools as a novice and made her perpetual vows in 1961 in the city of Masnou, where she was Superior and Mistress of Novices. In 1963, when she entered the convent, she began her teaching career at the Sant Narcís School in Girona.

In 1975, she graduated in Philosophy and Letters from the University of Barcelona and in 1993 she obtained a doctorate in Geography and History, Cultural Anthropology and History of America and Asia at the same center. She became a social activist in the neighbourhood of Can Serra, in Hospitalet de Llobregat, demanding improvements in housing and social services. In 1976, as a member of the Grup de Dones de Can Serra association, she led the feminist training programme giving literacy courses, training in embroidery, theatre, gymnasium and the publication of poetry books.

Until 1985, she worked as a secondary school teacher in the neighbourhood of Can Serra at the Institut Torres i Bages and at the Pedraforca Institute for Vocational Training. In 1986, he collaborated with the ecclesial communities of Base in Nicaragua during the Sandinista Revolution. From that year until 2016, she participated in literacy schools in Nicaragua and other Latin American countries in collaboration with the NGO Setem.

In 2000, she graduated in Ecclesiastical Sciences and Systematic Theology from the Faculty of Theology of Catalonia. Together with Joana Ripollès-Ponsí, Ortiz researched and published a monograph on the abbess Emma of Barcelona. She became president of the Collective of Women in the Church for Childbirth and was also part of the University Extension Classroom for the Elderly of the University of Barcelona.

Trayner died on 16 December 2025, at the age of 89.
