= James Hershberg =

James Hershberg (born 1960 in Brooklyn) is a professor of History and International Affairs at George Washington University, Elliott School of International Affairs. He is a graduate of Harvard College, Columbia University and Tufts University. Hershberg is a leading scholar on Cold War history and a former director of the Cold War International History Project at the Woodrow Wilson Center in Washington, DC. His first book was on the life of former Harvard President James Bryant Conant.

== Publications ==
- "The Cuban Missile Crisis." In The Cambridge History of the Cold War, vol. 2, ed. O.A. Westad and M.P. Leffler. Cambridge: Cambridge University Press, 2010.
- "Informing the Enemy: Sino-American 'Signaling' and the Vietnam War, 1965." In Behind the Bamboo Curtain: China, Vietnam, and the Cold War, ed. Priscilla Roberts, 193–257. Washington, D.C.: Woodrow Wilson Center Press/Stanford University Press, 2006. Co-authored with Chen Jian.
- "'The Jig Was Up': J. Robert Oppenheimer and the International Control of Atomic Energy, 1947-49." In Reappraising Oppenheimer: Centennial Studies and Reflections, ed. Cathryn Carson and David A. Hollinger, 149–183. Berkeley: Office for History of Science and Technology, University of California, Berkeley, 2005.
- "The United States, Brazil, and the Cuban Missile Crisis, 1962 (Parts 1 & 2)." Journal of Cold War Studies 6, no. 2 (Spring 2004): 3-20, and no. 3 (Summer 2004): 5-67.
- "Peace Probes and the Bombing Pause: Hungarian and Polish Diplomacy During the Vietnam War, December 1965-January 1966." Journal of Cold War Studies 5, no. 2 (Spring 2003): 32–67.
- James B. Conant: Harvard to Hiroshima and the Making of the Nuclear Age. New York: Knopf, 1993. (Winner, 1994 Stuart Bernath Prize from the Society for Historians of American Foreign Policy for the best first book on the history of American foreign relations. Republished by Stanford University Press, 1995.)
- Marigold: The Lost Chance for Peace in Vietnam, 2012, ISBN 978-0-804-77884-8. Named one of The Washington Post's 10 best books of 2012 (WP: 11/16/2012).
