= Rafael de Paula =

Spanish bullfighter (1940–2025)

Rafael Soto Moreno (11 February 1940 – 2 November 2025), better known as Rafael de Paula, was a Spanish bullfighter.

== Life and career ==
Moreno was born in Jerez de la Frontera on 11 February 1940. He made his debut on 9 May 1957 in Ronda.

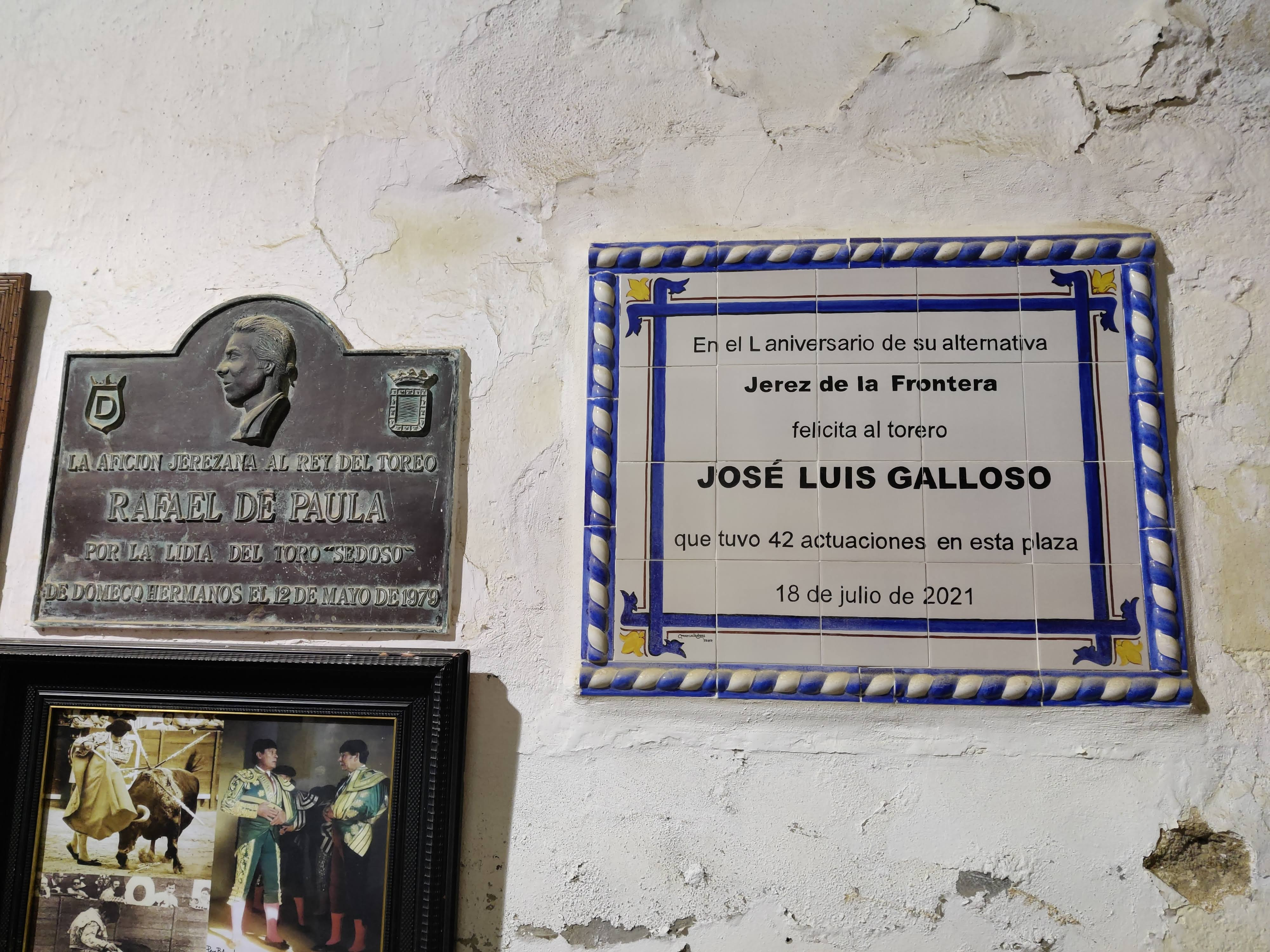
Plaque honoring Rafael de Paula at the Plaza de Toros de Jerez de la Frontera

In 2002, he received the Gold Medal of Merit in the Fine Arts. In 2012, he received the Joaquín Vidal National University Bullfighting Award, awarded by the Mazzantini Circle.

In 2014, he was arrested by the police for attempted assault on his lawyer.

De Paula died from cardiovascular complications on 2 November 2025, at the age of 85.
