= Josep Antoni Rom Rodríguez =

Spanish historian and academic (1963–2025)

- Born: Josep Antoni Rom Rodríguez; 23 March 1963; Barcelona, Spain
- Died: 8 November 2025 (aged 62); Spain
- Occupation: University Teacher
- Known for: Rector of Universitat Ramon Llull (2022–2025)

Josep Antoni Rom Rodríguez (23 March 1963 – 8 November 2025) was a Spanish historian and academic.

== Life and career ==
Rom Rodríguez was born in Barcelona on 23 March 1963. He graduated in Contemporary History from the University of Barcelona in 1987, and received his PhD in Advertising and Public Relations from Ramon Llull University in 2004, where he became a professor. He was involved in various entities linked to the Archbishopric of Barcelona.

He joined the Blanquerna Foundation in 1994, where he co-founded the Blanquerna-URL Faculty of Communication and International Relations, where he was Vice-Dean of Technology since 1998 and Director of the Bachelor's Degree in Advertising course since 2016. He was Vice-Rector for Research and Innovation at URL from September 2020 to September 2022. He has carried out an outstanding scientific and teaching activity related to advertising and marketing.

Rom Rodríguez was appointed rector of the URL in September 2022, replacing Josep Maria Garrell, a position he held until his death.

Rom Rodríguez died from a heart attack in the early hours of 8 November 2025, at the age of 61. Several personalities gave their condolences, including the president of the Generalitat of Catalonia, Salvador Illa.
