= Joan Callau i Bartolí =

Spanish politician (1959–2025)

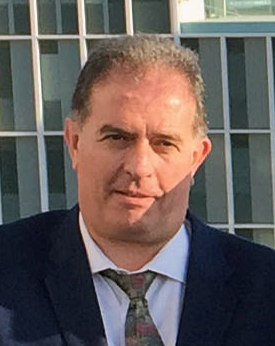
Callau in 2016

Joan Callau i Bartolí (1959 – 20 July 2025) was a Spanish politician. He served as mayor of Sant Adrià de Besòs from 2013 to 2021.

== Life and career ==
Callau was born in Santa Coloma de Queralt in 1959. He was a member of the Socialists' Party of Catalonia (PSC) and was a councilor of the City Council of Sant Adrià de Besòs since 1995, occupying several areas, in recent years that of urban planning, carrying out, since 2004, the transformation of the Forum area. He was also president of the Federation of Barcelonès Nord of the PSC and national councillor of the party.

Re-elected as mayor in 2019, mid-term, on 23 March 2021, he submitted his resignation from the position with the idea of making a transition in the mayor's office, a "natural and generational" replacement, proposing as a substitute the deputy mayor, Filo Cañete, linked to the consistory since 2007. Callau denied that his resignation had to do with the fact that he had been investigated since 2017 for the case of tolerance of an illegal nightclub by the city council, which also splashed his predecessor.

When he left the mayor's office, just six days after his resignation, the PSC appointed him advisor in the Metropolitan Area of Barcelona.

Callau died on 20 July 2025, at the age of 65.
