= 2025 FIM Stock European Championship =

Edition of a motorsport season

2025 FIM Stock European Championship
Previous:	2024	Next:	2026
Support series: JuniorGP World Championship; FIM Moto2 European Championship; European Talent Cup

The 2025 FIM Stock European Championship was the third season of the FIM Stock European Championship class.

The season was held over 7 meetings, beginning on 4 May at Estoril and ending on 23 November at Valencia.

This season was marred by the death of Spanish rider Borja Gómez at the Magny-Cours round.

== Calendar and results ==
The provisional calendar was announced in October 2024.

round	Date	Circuit	Pole position	Fastest lap	Race winner	Winning team	Winning constructor
1	4 May	(Portugal) Estoril	(Spain) Iker García	(Hungary) Tibor Varga	(Spain) Iker García	(Spain) Yamaha GV Racing	(Japan) Yamaha
2	1 June	(Spain) Jerez	(Italy) Jacopo Cretaro	(Australia) Archie McDonald	(Spain) Borja Gómez	(Spain) Team Honda Laglisse	(Japan) Honda
3	6 July	(France) Magny-Cours	(Spain) Iker García	(Spain) Adrián Rodrígues	(Italy) Francesco Venturini	(Italy) AC Racing Team	(Japan) Yamaha
4	27 July	(Spain) Aragón	(Australia) Archie McDonald	(Italy) Jacopo Cretaro	(Italy) Jacopo Cretaro	(Italy) SF Racing	(Japan) Yamaha
5	21 September	(Italy) Misano	(Italy) Jacopo Cretaro	(Spain) Iker García	(Spain) Iker García	(Spain) Yamaha GV Racing	(Japan) Yamaha
6	2 November	(Spain) Catalunya	(Spain) Iker García	(Spain) Alberto García	(Hungary) Tibor Varga	(Spain) IUM Motorsports S.L.	(Japan) Yamaha
7	23 November	(Spain) Valencia	(Spain) Iker García	(Spain) Marco Tapia	(Spain) Iker García	(Spain) Yamaha GV Racing	(Japan) Yamaha

== Entry list ==
2025 entry list
Team	Constructor	No.	Rider	Rounds
(Spain) Team Honda Laglisse	Honda	12	(Spain) Borja Gómez	1–3
(Spain) Team Honda Laglisse	Honda	31	(Spain) Alberto García	1–4
(Spain) Team Honda Laglisse	Honda	69	(Australia) Archie McDonald	6–7
(Portugal) Team Moto Club de Loulé	Honda	58	(Portugal) Martim Jesus	7
(Spain) Kawasaki Palmeto JDO Racing Team	Kawasaki	35	(Spain) Yeray Saiz	1–3
(Spain) Kawasaki Palmeto JDO Racing Team	Kawasaki	45	(Spain) Robert Blázquez	7
(Spain) Kawasaki Palmeto JDO Racing Team	Kawasaki	61	(Spain) Javier Del Olmo	All
(Italy) AC Racing Team	Yamaha	33	(Italy) Francesco Venturini	All
(Italy) Altogo Racing Team	Yamaha	51	(Italy) Emanuele Andrenacci	7
(United States) Andifer American Racing	Yamaha	67	(Spain) Carlos Valle	1
(Spain) Andotrans Team Torrento	Yamaha	16	(Spain) Álvaro Fuentes	1–2, 4–7
(Spain) Andotrans Team Torrento	Yamaha	74	(Spain) Marcos Ludeña	3
(Spain) Andotrans Team Torrento	Yamaha	88	(Ukraine) Sviatoslav Pylypenko	All
(Spain) ARCO Yamaha Motor University Team	Yamaha	89	(Australia) Taiyo Aksu	7
(Italy) Da Corsa Competizione	Yamaha	18	(Italy) Domenico Passanisi	4
(Italy) Face Racing	Yamaha	3	(Australia) Jack Mahaffy	7
(Italy) Face Racing	Yamaha	18	(Italy) Domenico Passanisi	2–3
(Italy) Face Racing	Yamaha	38	(Spain) Marco Tapia	7
(Italy) Face Racing	Yamaha	39	(Italy) Andrea Bettin	1–2
(Italy) Face Racing	Yamaha	44	(Spain) Adrián Rodríguez	3–5
(Italy) Face Racing	Yamaha	71	(Spain) Rubén Romero	1–2
(Italy) Face Racing	Yamaha	83	(Italy) Matteo Patacca	6
(Italy) Face Racing	Yamaha	95	(Italy) Kevin Milani	5
(Italy) Face Racing	Yamaha	97	(Mexico) Cristo Romero	6
(United Kingdom) Gryd – MLav Racing	Yamaha	66	(Australia) Joel Kelso	7
(Italy) Fmtorrent	Yamaha	13	(Italy) Cristian Darliano	All
(Italy) Fmtorrent	Yamaha	18	(Italy) Domenico Passanisi	5
(Spain) IUM Motorsports S.L.	Yamaha	22	(Australia) Declan Van Rosmalen	All
(Spain) IUM Motorsports S.L.	Yamaha	47	(Hungary) Tibor Varga	All
(Spain) MDR Competición	Yamaha	25	(Hungary) Bence Kecskés	All
(Spain) MDR Competición	Yamaha	27	(Spain) Joan Diaz	All
(Spain) MDR Competición	Yamaha	37	(Spain) David Jiménez	All
(Spain) Mission Grand Prix	Yamaha	8	(South Korea) Kim Min-Jae	7
(Spain) Mission Grand Prix	Yamaha	23	(Spain) David Réal	6–7
(Spain) MRE Talent	Yamaha	96	(Spain) David Sanchís	1–4, 6–7
(Italy) Pitformance VRS	Yamaha	48	(Italy) Lorenzo Dalla Porta	1
(Italy) Pitformance VRS	Yamaha	52	(France) Andy Verdoïa	2
(Italy) Pitformance VRS	Yamaha	72	(Colombia) Alfonso Linares	1
(Spain) Promoracing	Yamaha	10	(Italy) Filippo Fuligni	All
(Spain) Promoracing	Yamaha	43	(United Kingdom) Amanuel Brinton	All
(Spain) Promoracing	Yamaha	76	(Portugal) Gonçalo Capote	All
(Spain) PS Racing Team	Yamaha	19	(China) Shuai Li	1–2, 4–7
(Spain) PS Racing Team	Yamaha	39	(Italy) Andrea Bettin	6
(Spain) PS Racing Team	Yamaha	69	(Australia) Archie McDonald	1–5
(Spain) SF Racing	Yamaha	71	(Spain) Rubén Romero	3–7
(Spain) SF Racing	Yamaha	73	(Italy) Jacopo Cretaro	All
(Spain) SF Racing	Yamaha	86	(Switzerland) Kylian Nestola	1–2
(Germany) Team Ravenol Motorsport	Yamaha	57	(Germany) Mitja Borgelt	6–7
(Spain) Viñales Racing Team	Yamaha	7	(France) Charly Malterre	1
(Spain) Viñales Racing Team	Yamaha	32	(Portugal) Rodrigo Valente	1–2
(Spain) Viñales Racing Team	Yamaha	34	(Italy) Marco Gaggi	2
(Spain) Yamaha GV Racing	Yamaha	2	(Italy) Nicholas Bevilacqua	All
(Spain) Yamaha GV Racing	Yamaha	11	(Spain) Iker García	All
(Spain) Yamaha GV Racing	Yamaha	31	(Spain) Alberto García	5–7
(Spain) Yamaha GV Racing	Yamaha	35	(Spain) Yeray Saiz	6–7
(Spain) Yamaha GV Racing	Yamaha	62	(Spain) Blai Trias	All
(Spain) Yamaha GV Racing	Yamaha	81	(Spain) Joan Santos	All
(Spain) Zivimotor Team	Yamaha	26	(Spain) Francisco Ruiz	All
(Spain) Zivimotor Team	Yamaha	49	(Spain) Javier Aparisi	1–2, 4–7

== Championship' standings ==
Scoring system

Points were awarded to the top fifteen finishers. Rider had to finish the race to earn points.

Position	1st	2nd	3rd	4th	5th	6th	7th	8th	9th	10th	11th	12th	13th	14th	15th
Points	25	20	16	13	11	10	9	8	7	6	5	4	3	2	1

=== Riders' championship ===
Pos.	Rider	Bike	EST (Portugal)	JER (Spain)	MAG (France)	ARA (Spain)	MIS (Italy)	CAT (Spain)	VAL (Spain)	Points
1	(Spain) Iker García	Yamaha	1^{P}	5	3^{P}	5	1^{F}	Ret^{P}	1^{P}	105
2	(Hungary) Tibor Varga	Yamaha	4^{F}	10	2	3	5	1	10	87
3	(Italy) Jacopo Cretaro	Yamaha	3	14^{P}	8	1^{F}	14^{P}	2	4	82
4	(Spain) Blai Trias	Yamaha	11	3	5	9	7	4	8	63.5
5	(Spain) Álvaro Fuertes	Yamaha	16	6		4	3	5	9	57
6	(Spain) Alberto García	Honda	9	17	WD	12				55
6	(Spain) Alberto García	Yamaha					2	12^{F}	2	55
7	(Spain) Rubén Romero	Yamaha	15	Ret	7	2	6	8	5	54.5
8	(Australia) Archie McDonald	Yamaha	5	2^{F}	10	Ret^{P}	WD			53
8	(Australia) Archie McDonald	Honda						6	7	53
9	(Spain) Borja Gómez	Honda	2	1	WD					45
10	(Spain) Joan Diaz	Yamaha	7	7	WD	10	10	10	Ret	36
11	(Italy) Francesco Venturini	Yamaha	22	15	1	DSQ	15	3	Ret	30.5
12	(Italy) Filippo Fuligni	Yamaha	Ret	8	DSQ	7	4	Ret	24	30
13	(United Kingdom) Amanuel Brinton	Yamaha	10	16	6	11	9	9	Ret	30
14	(Spain) Joan Santos	Yamaha	Ret	9		Ret	8	7	13	27
15	(Spain) David Jiménez	Yamaha	8	13	DNS	14	12	Ret	15	18
16	(Spain) Francisco Ruiz	Yamaha	13	Ret	Ret	Ret	11	11	12	17
17	(Spain) Marco Tapia	Yamaha							3^{F}	16
18	(Spain) David Sanchís	Yamaha	12	Ret	WD	6		14	Ret	16
19	(Hungary) Bence Kecskés	Yamaha	14	12	12	8	Ret	WD	Ret	16
20	(France) Andy Verdoïa	Yamaha		4						13
21	(Spain) David Réal	Yamaha						Ret	6	10
22	(Italy) Lorenzo Dalla Porta	Yamaha	6							10
23	(Portugal) Gonçalo Capote	Yamaha	17	18	9	Ret	Ret	13	14	8.5
24	(Australia) Declan Van Rosmalen	Yamaha	18	19	13	13	13	15	Ret	8.5
25	(Spain) Adrián Rodrígues	Yamaha			4^{F}	15	Ret			7.5
26	(Italy) Marco Gaggi	Yamaha		11						5
27	(Australia) Taiyo Aksu	Yamaha							11	5
28	(Spain) Marcos Lundeña	Yamaha			11					2.5
29	(Ukraine) Sviatoslav Pylypenko	Yamaha	23	21	WD	16	18	21	21	0
30	(Italy) Nicholas Bevilacqua	Yamaha	21	25	WD	Ret	16	Ret	20	0
31	(Italy) Matteo Patacca	Yamaha						16		0
32	(Australia) Jack Mahaffy	Yamaha							16	0
33	(Spain) Javier Del Olmo	Kawasaki	19	22	WD	Ret	17	18	17	0
34	(Italy) Cristian Darliano	Yamaha	26	24	Ret	17	19	17	22	0
35	(Spain) Javier Aparisi	Yamaha	DNPQ	NC		18	21	23	DNQ	0
36	(Portugal) Martim Jesus	Honda							18	0
37	(Spain) Yeray Saiz	Kawasaki	20	23	WD					0
37	(Spain) Yeray Saiz	Yamaha						19	Ret	0
38	(Italy) Emanuele Andrenacci	Yamaha							19	0
39	(Italy) Andrea Bettin	Yamaha	24	26				20		0
40	(Switzerland) Kylian Nestola	Yamaha	Ret	20						0
41	(Italy) Kevin Milani	Yamaha					20			0
42	(China) Shuai Li	Yamaha	DNQ	DNPQ		WD	22	24	DNQ	0
43	(Mexico) Cristo Romero	Yamaha						22		0
44	(Spain) Robert Blázquez	Kawasaki							23	0
45	(Portugal) Rodrigo Valente	Yamaha	25	DSQ						0
46	(Spain) Carlos Valle	Yamaha	27							0
	(Italy) Domenico Passanisi	Yamaha		DSQ	Ret	DNS	Ret			0
	(Germany) Mitja Borgelt	Yamaha						Ret	Ret	0
	(France) Charly Malterre	Yamaha	Ret							0
	(Colombia) Alfonso Linares	Yamaha	Ret							0
	(Australia) Joel Kelso	Yamaha							WD	
	(South Korea) Kim Min-Jae	Yamaha							WD	
Pos.	Rider	Bike	EST (Portugal)	JER (Spain)	MAG (France)	ARA (Spain)	MIS (Italy)	CAT (Spain)	VAL (Spain)	Points

Colour	Result
Gold	Winner
Silver	Second place
Bronze	Third place
Green	Points classification
Blue	Non-points classification
Blue	Non-classified finish (NC)
Purple	Retired, not classified (Ret)
Red	Did not qualify (DNQ)
Red	Did not pre-qualify (DNPQ)
Black	Disqualified (DSQ)
White	Did not start (DNS)
White	Withdrew (WD)
White	Race cancelled (C)
Blank	Did not practice (DNP)
Blank	Did not arrive (DNA)
Blank	Excluded (EX)

P – Pole position
F – Fastest lap
