= F International =

Software companies of the United Kingdom

- F International Logo used from 1974-1988
- Formerly: Freelance Programmers
- Type: Private until 1985
- Industry: Software and systems services, process outsourcing
- Founded: 1962 in Chesham, UK
- Founder: Stephanie Shirley
- Fate: Re-organised and renamed as the 'FI Group' in 1988
- Successors: FI Group, Xansa
- Services: Systems specification, software development, process outsourcing, consulting
- Revenue: £7.60m (1985)
- Number of employees: 1009 (1985)
- Footnotes; Revenue and employee statistics are from 1985 - 'key year' in the history of the business

F International was a British freelance software and systems services company, founded as Freelance Programmers in England in 1962, by Dame Stephanie Shirley; she was involved in the company until she retired in 1993. The company was renamed in 1974 to F International. In 1988 the company was renamed again, to The FI Group, and later as Xansa plc. Xansa plc was acquired by the French company now known as Sopra Steria in 2007.

== History ==
=== Founding ===
F International was founded in 1962 when successful female entrepreneurs and freelance working were rare. Steve Shirley started the company despite having no capital or business experience, to escape the constraints of working as a woman in a predominantly male working context:

It sounded mad. Drawbacks included the following. I had no capital to speak of. I had no experience of running a company. I had no employees, no office, no customers, and no reason to believe that there were any companies out there with any interest in buying my product. Nobody sold software in those days. In so far as it existed, it was given away free.

— Dame Stephanie Shirley.

The total revenues for the first 10-month tax year were £1,700.

The Cranfield School of Management undertook a study of the reported differences between male and female entrepreneurs in the late 1980s, concluding that because of the differences in context and background for men and women, the principal factor for successful women entrepreneurs was the nature of market entry. F International is an early example: business and industry were short of computer-skilled people, and the nature of much software and systems work was, even at that time, amenable to homeworking.

The company, then known as "Freelance Programmers", was registered on 13 May 1964 and a "panel" of freelance software and systems specialists, nearly all female, began to work for the company. An early assignment came from Urwick Diebold and this attracted attention from the media. The early days were difficult; at one point Kit Grindley, a recent acquaintance at Urwick Diebold, wrote Steve a cheque for £500 to cover operating costs and payments to the workforce. Once over the early cash flow problems the business began to grow. By 1966, there were about 75 regular freelance workers on the panel, some of whom became significant role players as technical experts and project managers. Seriously problematic projects were rare, but one in particular, with Castrol, forced the management team to focus on quality management. Quality management became one of the foundations of the operating model for the company.

At the start, in the 1960s, there were no accessible data communications services and no Internet, but in the 1970s the business attracted interest from academics and futurists as an example of remote work. The Harvard Business School documented the F International business in a number of case studies. The business was the subject of several other international academic studies of homeworking.

=== Early history ===
In the 1970s the company's development paralleled the emergence of feminist thinking and the consequent awareness and pre-occupation with gender equality; together these led to legislation in the United Kingdom that was intended to bring equal rights to women but had unexpected consequences; F International was specifically offering employment to women, and therefore they had to adjust their policies to be gender-independent.

I felt strongly that my “female” approach, which had attracted such scorn in the business’s early years, had been vindicated, and it irked me that the state, in addition to its other meddlings, had now declared that approach illegal. Still, there was no point in quarrelling with the law, especially such a well-intentioned one. At a board meeting ... we amended our personnel policy again. Our purpose was now to provide employment for “people with dependants unable to work in a conventional environment.

— Dame Stephanie Shirley.

Despite these issues, the business continued to grow until the 1970s, when it encountered difficulties for at least two reasons: the business reported its first financial loss (of £3,815) and suffered its first significant personnel loss, when Pamela Woodman resigned to form Pamela Woodman Associates, working in direct competition to Freelance Programmers. However, by the end of the decade, revenue had risen to £2.5m and there was a partnership with Heights Information Technology Services Inc in the United States, F International ApS in Copenhagen, servicing Scandinavia, and F International BV in Amsterdam, servicing the Benelux countries; At home, still in the 1970s, spin-off businesses were re-absorbed into the parent business which was re-established in 1974 as "F International".

By 1980 the business had developed country-wide coverage with more than 600 staff. The administrative headquarters for the UK were then based in Chesham, Buckinghamshire, where the original organisation, Freelance Programmers had been founded.

F International was a founder member of the Computing Services Association, and was active in the British Computer Society and the Institute for Data Processing Management (IDPM) It was in the early 1980s that a wider general interest in remote work via telecommunications support became evident.

=== The middle years - Timeline ===
Key dates in the 1980s-1990s include:

- 1981 - Freehold premises were bought in Berkhamsted
- 1981 - Steve Shirley established the F International Shareholders’ Trust to share the ownership of the company. In that year revenues had reached £3.4m.
- 1982 - A subsidiary was established in Edinburgh
- 1983 - Franchising of Heights Information Technology Services Inc (USA)
- 1984 - Following re-structuring, a survey was undertaken to establish the feelings of the workforce about the changes
- 1984 - The F International Charter was developed and published
- 1985 - The US partner company, now owned, was sold, and Hilary Cropper was appointed as Chief Executive of UK Operations
- 1985 - Quality management was successfully assessed to Ministry of Defence DEF STAN 05-21 standards
- 1985 - F International was re-registered as a Public Limited Company (but not quoted on the stock exchange, an unusual move for a plc)
- 1985 - By the end of 1985 13% of the ownership of the business had been taken up by outside interests and 17% was with the FI Shareholders’ Trust
- 1986 - A primitive email service based on Prestel was introduced
- 1987 - In the Times’ Top 500 Companies, 25 per cent of the top 500 were FI Group clients, as were 50 of the top 100 and eight of its top 10.
- 1987 - The company held a Silver Jubilee at the National Exhibition Centre to celebrate 25 years of operations
- 1987 - A further gift of 7% of the shares took staff ownership just short of 25%
- 1988 - The company name was changed again, to "FI Group"
- 1990 - Sir John Harvey-Jones (the Troubleshooter) opened a new FI Group headquarters and commended the company's success, that he attributed to "flexibility and speed" coupled with "decentralisation, delegation and releasing energy rather than [seeking] control"
- 1991 - Staff take 44% ownership of the company by means of a workforce share scheme
- 1996 - The company was floated on the London Stock Exchange in March

=== Later history ===
As the 1990s opened, the company made several strategic acquisitions, for example AMP Computer Recruitment in 1990 and the Kernel Group in 1991, with the objective of providing clients with staffing and training services. In 1997, IIS Infotech Limited, an Indian computer services company based in New Delhi was acquired, joined in 1999 by a small London-based project management and IT consultancy group and in 2000 by Druid, a Reading-based software consultancy.

In March 2001, now a substantial and international business with over 6,000 employees, a market capitalisation of £1.2bn and projected sales for the coming year of £515m, the company announced that it was going to change its name to Xansa plc.

=== Analysis ===
Following the 60th anniversary of the company's founding, Tony Bryant has edited (and contributed to) a “First Monday” special issue on “Women and STEM”, that records the "rise and fall" of F international. It is focused on the contextual reasons why its fall was inevitable, but finds that the durability of the organisation in the face of the pressures upon it to "normalise", was remarkable.

== Philosophy and method of working ==
The founding idea at F International was to provide meaningful home-based employment for young mothers with software skills, and later (when challenged by the legislation on sex discrimination) for "people with dependents unable to work in a conventional environment".

Although for the first decade the F International workforce communicated successfully on a daily basis, using the United Kingdom overnight first class mail service, home working became increasingly interesting and increasingly accepted as telecommunications services became available. The F International story attracted extensive public and professional interest, for example in Tomorrow's World (a long-running BBC science and technology programme), and books by Ralf Dahrendorf, Alvin Toffler, Michel Syrett, and Francis Kinsman. Steve herself continued to write and speak about the business model and the benefits for the workforce.

In his book "The Third Wave" Alvin Toffler included a Chapter on "The Electronic Cottage" wherein he quotes from a 1971 report by the Institute for the Future suggesting a range of occupations that could be undertaken from home, and mentioning F International as one example. Toffler wrote (quoting from the IFF report):

... many of the present duties of the secretary "could be done from home as well as in the office. Such a system would increase the labor pool by allowing married secretaries caring for small children at home to continue to work ... there may be no overriding reason why a secretary could not just as well, in many instances, take dictation at home and type the text on a home terminal which produces a clean text at the author's home or office." In addition, IFF continued, "Many of the tasks performed by engineers, draftsmen, and other white-collar employees might be done from home as readily as, or sometimes more readily than, from the office.' One "seed of the future" exists already in Britain, for example, where a company called F. International Ltd. (the "F" stands for Freelance) employs 400 part-time computer programmers, all but a handful of whom work in their own homes. The company, which organizes teams of programmers for industry, has expanded to Holland and Scandinavia and counts among its clients such giants as British Steel, Shell, and Unilever.

— Alvin Toffler.

In a book concerning adapting to change in the world of work (and surviving) Michel Syrett summarised some of the particulars of working with F International:

Around 71 per cent of staff work from home — ideal for married women, and for a slowly growing number of men who likewise appreciate being able to care for children, or maybe start their own business. Hours are from a minimum of 20 a week when a project is underway ... contact with head office and the five regional sales offices is through project managers and staffing co-ordinators. In essence the company uses the skills of women who have opted out of the everyday labour market after having had at least four years work experience with computers.

— Michel Syrett

More recently Steve Shirley has observed that the F International way of working presaged many features of the gig economy: flexibility, variable remuneration for different modes of working, and a high level of self-reliance. Comments from Ralf Dahrendorf (in a television programme marking his retirement from the London School of Economics) support this idea. When he addressed the question: 'Has Britain got a future?', he said:

Some answers may be found in Party Manifestos. But the real changes are to be found where people live and work. F International has several characteristics which make it a model. It allows people to organise their own lives; it decentralises management decisions; it makes effective use of modern technology — and of course, it is successful.

— Dahrendorf on Britain, BBC1, January 1983

Despite the extensive practice of home working amongst its employees, the company introduced its "workcentre" concept towards the end of the 1980s, necessitated by the acquisition of larger clients and in response to research conducted among its workforce. By 1989, around 40% of the company's workforce was based in one of the ten centres, these being "deliberately conceived as upmarket" and intended to mitigate feelings of isolation experienced by those working from home.

== Working standards ==
As well as a Quality Manual there were ten other management manuals dealing with: quality policy, project management, estimating, and technical standards for general work, consulting work, systems design, software documentation, software testing and configuration management. The commitment gained from individuals who took direct responsibility for their own work, working by themselves at home, led to significant productivity gains of more than 40% when compared to conventional software and systems businesses. This was underpinned by the early focus on estimating and costing projects accurately in advance; there were sound systems in place to monitor progress, costs and quality.

== Innovation and outreach ==
Some aspects of the company's technical work on standards and methods were published in technical journals and presented at international conferences. Senior technical staff and management contributed to technical journals and conferences concerning issues such as management measurement techniques methods of systems analysis maintenance, strategy and standards. The paper by Calow on maintenance is particularly interesting, because it explains how a strategy was devised to manage the maintenance of legacy systems, freeing mainline systems development staff to undertake productive work and significantly reducing the frequency of bugs and systems failures; this was a key feature of the F International strategy at the time.
