= Buchthal =

Buchthal is a surname. Notable people with the surname include:

- Arnold Buchthal (1900–1965), German lawyer
- Eugen Buchthal (1878–1954), German businessman and art collector
- Hugo Buchthal (1909–1996), German art historian
- Rosa Buchthal (1874–1958), German politician
