= Shirley Foundation =

United Kingdom-based charity

The Shirley Foundation, based in the United Kingdom, was established in 1996 by Dame Stephanie Shirley CH, who gave a substantial endowment to establish a charitable trust fund. The foundation ranked in the top 50 of grant giving foundations in the UK and was 'spent out' in 2018.

Major awards have been given as follows: £15m has been given to the Worshipful Company of Information Technologists and the Oxford Internet Institute. Over £50m has been given for autism spectrum disorders. including setting up three charities: Autism at Kingwood founded in 1994 (support services); Prior's Court Foundation founded in 1999 (education) and Autistica founded in 2004 (research) which together employ over 1,000 staff. The foundation also founded Autism Cymru charity (1999-2011); the All-Party Parliamentary Group on Autism (1999); the National Autism Project (2014-2019); the National Autistic Taskforce (2017-); and supported the Patrick Wild Centre; Autism Together; The Autism Research Centre and many others (70 autism projects in total).

== Archive ==
In 2019, a donation from Shirley helped to establish the UK Philanthropy Archive based at the University of Kent Special Collections & Archives. In addition to the financial contribution Shirley also donated the records of The Shirley Foundation. The archive currently holds eight other collections in addition to the Shirley Foundation's records, and material is actively being acquired in order to establish better evidence of philanthropy and its impact.
