= Danny Beath =

British photographer and botanist (1960–2013)

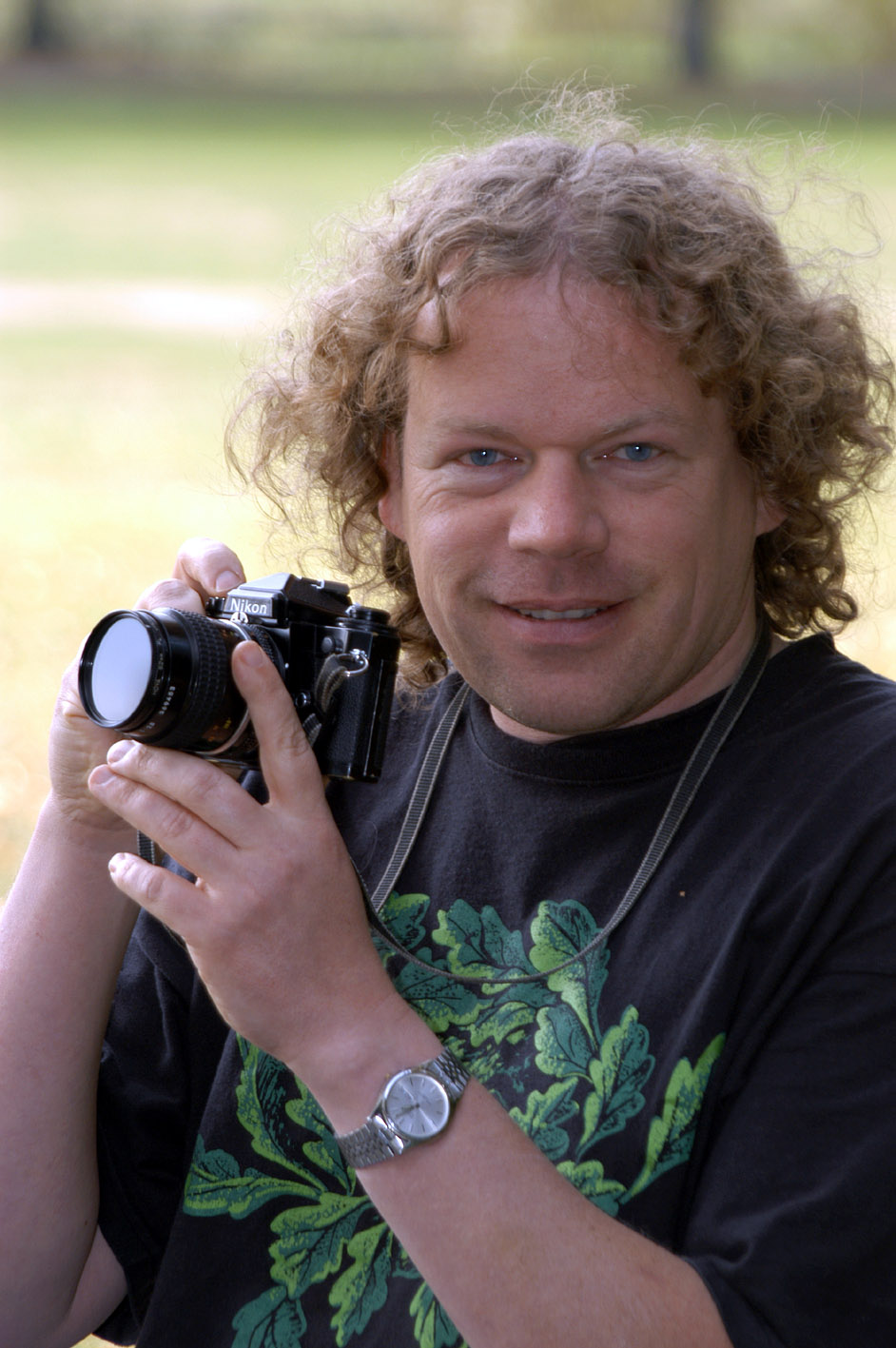
- Danny Beath in 2002
- Born: David Daniel Nicholas Beath; 6 September 1960; Berlin, West Germany
- Died: 14 January 2013 (aged 52)
- Education: University of Reading; University of Aberdeen
- Occupation: Photographer
- Website: www.flickr.com/photos/flickering_velvet/ smilingleafimages.co.uk (smilingleafimages is no longer available)

David Daniel Nicholas Beath (6 September 1960 – 14 January 2013) was a British landscape and wildlife photographer and botanist. He was renowned for his images of Scottish, Welsh and Shropshire flora and fauna, in particular butterflies and fungi.

== Early life ==
Beath was born in Berlin in 1960 to a military father (Capt DTL Beath SCLI). The family had numerous postings to military camps around the world including Singapore in 1966 and Malaya in 1967 and it is here where he became acquainted with tropical fauna and flora for the first time. A consistent education was difficult owing to numerous family moves and after some unhappy boarding school placements he became a pupil at Shotton Hall in Shropshire in 1973 where he began to flourish intellectually. His appreciation of the natural world at that time is demonstrated in a plant map of the grounds of Shotton Hall (1975). He left Shotton Hall in 1978 and gained entrance to Bridgwater College (then known as Cannington Horticultural College) in Somerset.

== Research ==
After graduating from the University of Reading in 1987 with a BSc in Botany, Beath went on to study for a PhD in Tropical ecology at the University of Aberdeen between 1989 and 1993. During his post-graduate and post-doctoral period, he travelled extensively through the rainforests of the Old and New World, including several years' experience in West Africa and Central America. It was here that he did much of the research for his papers and articles on the pollination of Amorphophallus johnsonii by Silphidae, the biology and pollination ecology of Araceae in Ghana and spadix heating in African arcaeae.

== Autism ==
Beath was diagnosed with Asperger's syndrome at the age of four in 1964, thanks to the persistence of his mother who knew he wasn't simply "retarded" (as it was expressed in the language of the day). She took him to see Dr Kenneth Soddy and followed his programme for autistic children which emphasised inclusive and stimulating activities with trusted family members such as singing, talking, reading aloud and imaginative play and a reduction in the time he was allowed to spend in solitary activities. Within eighteen months he was speaking and enjoying play with children he knew but remained shy and confused when confronted with children unknown to him or in a setting outside his home. As an adult, he became an advocate for those living with autism and frequently gave talks about his life and living with the syndrome. He was an active participant, supporter and speaker of Autonomy Shropshire (a self-help group based in Shropshire for young people and adults with high ability autism) and Autism Cymru. For several years, he was an advisor to the board on autism spectrum disorders for Autistica.

== Photography ==
Like his great uncle Ivo Peters, Beath's main passion in life was photography. His photographic subjects included a wide range of insects (especially beetles, butterflies and moths), amphibians and birds as well as the flora of tropical rainforests, which were the subject of his thesis. He was completely self-taught, and it was when studying for his PhD at The University of Aberdeen that his passion really took off. He joined the university's camera club and started to refine his photographic technique and also developed an interest in photographing Scottish landscapes. In the last decade he had focused photographing the natural landscapes in and around his hometown of Shrewsbury. He was a keen member of the Shropshire Photographic Society and was the club's competition secretary for several years. During 2010 he was commissioned to write a monthly feature about Shropshire photography through the seasons in Shropshire Life magazine.

== Death ==
Beath died of a heart attack on 14 January 2013 at the age of 52. On the day of his funeral he was announced as the winner of the Travel Photo of the Year competition.

== Competitions ==
| Year | Competition | Result | Photo |
|---|---|---|---|
| 2013 | International Garden Photographer of the Year (IGPOTY) | Third place (Breathing Spaces) | A Walk along the River (River Severn, Shrewsbury) |
| 2012 | Wanderlust Travel Photo of the Year | Winner of Landscape Category | Storm over Blackstone |
| 2012 | Take a View | The Sunday Times Magazine's Choice Award | Mist on the Welsh Marches |
| 2012 | National Insect Week | Second Prize (Riverfly Competition) | Clump of caddis fly spawn on the tip of a leaf |
| 2012 | Wild Shropshire Photography Competition | Overall Winner & Landscape Category Winner | Dawn at Blakemere Reach |
| 2012 | International Garden Photographer of the Year (IGPOTY) | Finalist (Fragile landscapes) | Silver Studded Blue habitat |
| 2012 | International Garden Photographer of the Year (IGPOTY) | Highly commended (Fragile landscapes) | Scrubs Wildflower Meadow |
| 2012 | Wild Shropshire Photography Competition | Overall winner | Morning Mist in Ellesmere |
| 2012 | Wild Shropshire Photography Competition | First prize (Landscape category) | Morning Mist in Ellesmere |
| 2012 | Wild Shropshire Photography Competition | Highly commended (Bird category) | Skein of geese |
| 2012 | Keele 3 Counties Print Competition | First Prize | Mist over the Welsh Marches |
| 2012 | Shrewsbury Open Photography Exhibition | Silver Selector's Medal | Mist over the Welsh Marches |
| 2011 | International Garden Photographer of the Year (IGPOTY) | Highly Commended (Wildflowers) | Bee Visiting Catkins on the First Warm Day of Spring |
| 2011 | Harper Adams Photography Exhibition | Competition Winner | Mitchell's Fold |
| 2011 | International Garden Photographer of the Year (IGPOTY) | Finalist (Four seasons category) | Mayfly at sunset |
| 2011 | International Garden Photographer of the Year (IGPOTY) | Highly commended (Trees category) | Trees in the mist |
| 2011 | Wanderlust Travel Photo of the Year | Finalist (Icon category) | Guggenheim museum, Bilbao |
| 2011 | Wanderlust Travel Photo of the Year | Finalist (Landscape category) | View down to Curral Das Freiras |
| 2010 | National Insect Week | First Prize (18+ Category) | Emerging Crane Fly |
| 2010 | National Insect Week | First Prize (Riverfly Competition) | Silhouette of a Mayfly at Sunset |
| 2010 | National Insect Week | Commendation (18+ Category) | Silhouette of a Mayfly at Sunset |
| 2010 | Plant Life | Competition Winner | Red poppy field, Pim Hill |
| 2010 | British Wildlife Photography Awards | Highly Commended | Emerging Crane Fly |
| 2010 | International Garden Photographer of the Year (IGPOTY) | Commended (Garden Views) | Jardin Botanico Wilson, Costa Rica |
| 2009 | International Garden Photographer of the Year (IGPOTY) | Commendation (World botanic gardens) | The Climatron |
| 2009 | Wanderlust Travel Photo of the Year | Finalist (Landscape category) | Mountain aloes, Madeira |
| 2008 | National Insect Week | Commendation | Low-level view of a Fritillary butterfly in Spain |
| 2006 | Wanderlust Travel Photo of the Year | Runner-up (People category) | Children in the Mist |

== Exhibitions ==
| Date | Exhibition | Location |
|---|---|---|
| 1 August – 9 September 2013 | Danny Beath's Views of Shropshire | The Hive Gallery, Shrewsbury |
| 10–23 March 2013 | Shropshire Photographic Society | Bear Steps Gallery, Shrewsbury |
| 29–22 March April 2000 | A Shropshire Lad | Music Hall, Shrewsbury |
