= Xansa =

British outsourcing company

Xansa plc
- Type: Private - Subsidiary of Steria
- Founded: 1962
- Headquarters: UK, France and India
- Key people: Bill Alexander, Interim Chairman, MD Imran
- Products: IT outsourcing, business process outsourcing
- Revenue: £379.7m (FY07)
- Number of employees: 8,600 (50%+ in India)
- Parent: Sopra Steria
- Website: http://www.soprasteria.com

Xansa plc, trading as Xansa, was a British outsourcing and technology company, and was quoted on the London Stock Exchange until 17 October 2007 when the purchase of Xansa by Steria was completed and the company was delisted. Its headquarters were in Reading, Berkshire, England, and it had a major presence in India. In the 2007 financial year the company had a turnover of UK£379.7 million.

== History ==
The company began as Freelance Programmers, established in 1962 by Stephanie "Steve" Shirley. Two years later it was incorporated as Freelance Programmers Limited. Shirley wanted to create job opportunities for women with dependants, and predominantly employed women: there were only three male programmers in the first 300 staff, until the Sex Discrimination Act 1975 made that practice illegal. Her team's projects included programming Concorde's black box flight recorder.

In 1974 it became F International; the 'F' standing originally for Freelance but increasingly for Flexible and Free, too. By the late 1970s Steve Shirley had recognised that, as founder entrepreneur, it was time to let go and in 1987, with Hilary Cropper's appointment as CEO, was able to bow out.

F International became F.I.Group in 1988, and in 1991 Steve Shirley gave a controlling interest in FI to the workforce. In March 1996 FI was floated on the London Stock Exchange.

Between 1997 and 2000 FI acquired IIS Infotech Limited, an Indian computer services company based in New Delhi; OSI - a London-based business consulting and management support services company, and Reading-based IT consultancy company Druid.

In April 2001 the company's name was changed to Xansa.

In June 2007, Alistair Cox – the CEO since August 2002 – announced his resignation. His role was taken up by the chairman, Bill Alexander.

It was announced on 27 July to the London Stock Exchange that the company was in advanced talks regarding a possible takeover.

On 30 July 2007, Groupe Steria SCA announced a recommended cash offer for Xansa Plc of 130p per share. The purchase of Xansa was completed via a scheme of arrangement by Steria on 17 October 2007 and the company was delisted from the London Stock Exchange.

== Industries ==
Xansa operated across several business sectors, with divisions in banking, insurance, public sector, retail, telecoms, transport, logistics and utilities.

Xansa also had some smaller clients, including a high-profile partnership with Renault F1, and had a logo on the F1 car.

== See also ==
- F International
- List of Indian IT companies
