= Autism Cymru =

Former Welsh national charity for autism

- Founded: 2001
- Dissolved: Stopped operations and information filing after September 2015, removed from the register on 22 November 2019.
- Type: Non profit
- Registration no.: 1092527
- Purpose: Autism
- Location: Wales
- Region served: Within and outside Wales
- Services: Strategic Influence of Governments; Collaborative practice, Education and training, Research and awareness raising.
- Method: Practitioner led
- Key people: Lord Dafydd Wigley, Professor Bill Fraser CBE, Dame Steve Shirley, Maggie Bowen Deputy CEO, Hugh Morgan OBE Chief Executive
- Website: Former domain no longer operational

Autism Cymru was Wales' national charity for autism with offices in Cardiff, Wrexham, and Aberystwyth. The charity was established in May 2001 through an initial 3-year grant provided by The Shirley Foundation. The founder chair of the Trustees was Dame Stephanie Shirley of the Shirley Foundation.

Autism Cymru was a unique strategic level autism charity in that its strategic objectives were to influence government policy for autism in Wales, to bring about coherence to research in autism in Wales, to create far wider and knowledge of autism through creating training and related awareness raising initiatives. Having achieved all its strategic objectives the charity formally ceased operation in 2013/14.

In 2002/3 Autism Cymru made out the case to the Welsh Assembly Government that they should establish a world first national strategy for autism. The charity's CEO, Hugh Morgan, was appointed to chair the development of the Welsh Assembly Government's ASD Strategic Action Plan for Wales between 2003 and 2008. From 2008 to 2011 Autism Cymru agreed to second their CEO to the Welsh Assembly Government to head up in the foundation phase of the ASD Strategic Action Plan for Wales and from 2011 to 2012 Hugh Morgan OBE was seconded to be the Expert advisor for Autism to the Welsh Assembly Government.

Autism Cymru organised and delivered the first of four bi-annual international autism conferences in 2006 in Cardiff City Hall attracting 800 delegates over 2.5days. Speakers coming to Cardiff included Temple Grandin, Gary Mesibov, Tony Atwood, Ros Blackburn, Chris Gilberg.

In the summer of 2006 Autism Cymru was made Channel S4C's 'charity of the year' featuring several televised programmes on autism and events including a sponsored walk for autism from Abertawe to Aberystwyth.

After holding 3 research workshops involving autism researchers from throughout Wales in 2006/7 Autism Cymru initiated a fundraising partnership with Autistica to generate sufficient funds to establish a Wales Autism Research Centre and the UK's first professorial chair in autism. In 2010 the Wales Autism Research Centre was launched in the School of Psychology, Cardiff University with the appointment as Director of Professor Sue Leekam, who became the first professorial chair in autism in the U.K.

At the personal invitation of the European Commission's Health and Consumer Affairs Commissioner, Autism Cymru organised an inaugural awareness raising day on autism within the European Parliament, Brussels, in 2011, involving NGO's with an interest in autism from throughout the European Union.

== History ==
The charity was founded in 2001 "to improve the lives of people in Wales with an autistic spectrum disorder and their families" by influencing major policy change, research and practice through education and training, research, awareness raising and collaborative efforts with other organizations. Start-up funding for the organization was provided by Dame Steve Shirley's The Shirley Foundation.

It was this charity which first created the concept of a government led national autism strategy, presenting the concept to Ministers in the Welsh Government in 2001. The Minister for Health and Social Services in Wales then announced on 4 December 2002 that the Welsh Government would develop the world's first national autism strategy in partnership with Autism Cymru. The CEO of Autism Cymru, Hugh Morgan OBE, chaired the development of the national autism strategy in Wales between 2003 and 2007. They then partnered with the Welsh Assembly Government to have it implemented, with Hugh Morgan seconded from the Charity to 'drive forward the implementation' from 2008 to 2011. It also initiated and brought together the partnership including Autistica, the Welsh Government and Autism Initiatives to about the Cardiff University department of psychology's Wales Autism Research Centre (WARC) with the first named professorial chair in autism in Britain and the development of the Wales Autism Research Centre. Another first, Autism Cymru created the world's first national web-based information service of AWARES.org for autistic people and their families. Since then, Autism Cymru's innovative approach to strategically influencing government been a model for charities in other countries, especially in Northern Ireland and Scotland where national autism strategies have also been developed recently.

As a founder member of the Celtic Nations Autism Partnership, it worked closely with its partner organizations, including Scottish Autism, Autism Northern Ireland, and the Irish Society for Autism. On a larger scale, Autism Cymru worked with organizations outside of the UK such as Autisme-Europe and ICare4Autism in the USA. On 6 November 2012, Autism Cymru spearheaded a major event and call in the European Parliament for the development of a European Strategy for Autism, alongside members of the Celtic Nations Autism Partnership and Autisme-Europe hosted by Welsh MEP, Dr Kay Swinburne.

Most of the £9 million in additional Welsh Government funding since 2008-9 gained for autism through the Welsh autism strategy (derived from the original concept by Autism Cymru) has gone to fund local infrastructure for service delivery and research programmes largely in the public sector.

Autism Cymru had held the Wales Autism International Conference in Cardiff 2004; speakers have included Dr Tony Attwood, Professor Christopher Gillberg, Professor Rita Jordan, Dr Temple Grandin, Dr Lorna Wing and Professor Digby Tantam. Past speakers also include Elizabeth Attfield, Mark Barrett, Danny Beath, Autism Cymru's Deputy Chief Executive Maggie Bowen, Colette Drift, Lynn Plimley, Hilary Kanaris, and Ros Blackburn. The charity had sponsored the annual AWARES on-line conference for autism since 2006. The Attention Card programme was developed with Welsh emergency services and is being used by the police forces in Wales and during 2012 has been extended to other emergency services including a national approach to the Welsh Ambulance Services Trust.

Autism Cymru was made Channel S4C's "Charity of the Year"; in 2003 was runner up in the UK Charity Awards for Children and Young People and in 2004 was Highly Commended in the Charity Awards.

== Vision ==
Autism Cymru's vision statement was:

Autism Cymru is committed at promoting its services and activities on both national and local scale by focusing approaches on person oriented services to ensure each person in Wales gets the proper diagnosis, education, services, housing, independent living and employment opportunities by working strategically and collaboratively with multidisciplinary partners which include: other research, education, medical and housing organizations, as well as employment and service companies.

== People ==
=== Patrons and chair ===
The original funding for Autism Cymru was provided in 2001 by president Dame Stephanie Shirley's Shirley Foundation, which was one of the top 50 grant-giving foundations in the United Kingdom. The charity's president was Dame Stephanie Shirley and patron was Lord Dafydd Wigley. The last chairperson of the Charity was Professor Bill Fraser CBE.

=== Staff ===
Hugh Morgan OBE, FRSA, was formerly the first CEO of Autism West Midlands, working with them from 1988 to 2001, before becoming the founder CEO of Autism Cymru in 2001. He was the author of several books on autism including Adults with Autism: A Guide to Theory and Practice, Cambridge University Press 1996, ISBN 0521456835. Maggie Bowen was the Deputy CEO. The charity had no administrative staff; its trustees and staff had considerable first hand experience of supporting people on the autism spectrum and their families.

=== Collaborators ===
Autism Cymru established collaborations with Wales Autism Research Centre and Autism Initiatives.

== Membership ==
Membership for individuals was free and could be obtained by applying online through the official website.

== Autism Cymru activities ==
Autism Cymru's activities included awareness development, collaboration with other organizations to realize their vision, participation in research and enhancement of educational opportunities. It worked with partners, such as Autism Initiatives and Wales Autism Research Centre (WARC).

=== Awareness ===
It sponsored Holly's Ball and Emily's Ball, events set up by the Holly and Emily's mothers to raise awareness about autism. It also sought to raise funds for the National Autistic Society and Autism Cymru, while celebrating World Autism Awareness Day.

=== Other organizations ===
Autism Cymru was a founder member of the Celtic Nations Autism Partnership, which was launched in collaboration with Autism Northern Ireland, Irish Society for Autism and the Scottish Autism in 2006/7; was a member of Autisme-Europe and had collaborations with others including Autism Initiatives and with Mudiad Ysgolian Meithrin.

=== Governmental and justice organizations ===
Governmental and justice organizations that Autism Cymru collaborated with included: local health boards and authorities, all four Welsh Police Forces, and the Wales Ambulance Service Trust on the Emergency Services ASD Attention Card Scheme and training, and most powerfully, work with the Welsh Assembly Government. Their national AWARES website, when launched in 2002 was believed to have been "the first national resource website of its kind in the world".

=== Research ===
Research activities included founding the partnership with Cardiff University and Autistica to create the Wales Autism Research Centre; and collaborations with Bro Morgannwg NHS Trust, S4C and other benefactors and Welsh universities. In 2004, Autism Cymru commenced conducting on-line international conferences on autism featuring many of the leading world figures on autism.

=== Education ===
Autistic Cymru set up the website for AWARES - the All Wales Autism Resource, which provides information for Welsh and English speaking autistic people in Wales and also ran annual world on-line conference. Hugh Morgan was quoted in 2002 by the BBC as having said: "AWARES is the start of a journey to create the largest online autism community in the country." The inclusive schools and autism training and research programme received also endorsement from education minister Jane Davidson of the Welsh Assembly Government in 2006; over 500 schools across Wales participated in the programme since 2006. Autism Cymru also ran national schools forums in Wales since 2004.

=== Training and employment ===
Autism Cymru collaborated with The Irish Society for Autism on the 2009-12 European-funded Deis Cyfle, a project that received some of its monies from the European Regional Development Fund. The project was launched on Monday 10 May 2010 and provided opportunities for people with autism in education and employment. It served over 5,700 people across Wales and Ireland.

=== Seminars ===
Adam Feinstein from AWARES ran a series of monthly one-day online seminars with leading figures from the world of autism. The online conferences were hosted by Autism Cymru. The seminars helped raise awareness of autism by inviting noted guest speakers and experts to address issues and answer questions. Guests included Carol Gray, President of The Gray Center for Social Learning and Understanding, and Professor Gary B. Mesibov, one of the world's leading authorities on topics related to autistic children and adults' education issues.

Autism Cymru ran a series of seminars on various locations with guest speakers addressing autism issues. Past speakers included Donna Williams, a person diagnosed with autism, a sociologist and qualified teacher and the author of nine published books.

=== Publications ===
They also produced 'award-winning' book publications.

== Autism Initiatives and C-Saw services ==
Autism Initiatives and C-SAW in North Wales, former partners of Autism Cymru, provided services for children and adults through a creative approach and lifelong support. C-Saw provided social activities and services. Three social clubs — grouped by age ranges 8 to 16, 16 to 25, and 25 and up — provided opportunities to socialize, build confidence and gain life skills. There was also a quarterly coffee mornings club for parents. Services offered by C-Saw included counselling, community outreach, transitional program for young people into adulthood, and physical activities.

== Housing opportunities ==
The collaborative sought to obtain more partnerships especially housing associations, local authorities and other trusts to join the effort in bringing Welsh autistic people supported living projects and quality housing solutions, respite and short break services, to solve what was described as 'Tomorrow's Big Problem' by Hugh Morgan.

== See also ==
- Wales Autism Research Centre
- Welsh Government
