= Pierre Pasquier =

Pierre Pasquier may refer to:

- Pierre Pasquier (businessman)
- Pierre Pasquier (colonial administrator)
- Pierre Pasquier (violist)
