= Will Nicholls =

English photographer (born 1995)

- Born: William Robert Nicholls; 9 January 1995; London, UK
- Education: University of Exeter
- Occupation: Wildlife cameraman
- Website: www.willnicholls.co.uk

Will Nicholls is a professional wildlife cameraman and wildlife photographer from Northumberland in the United Kingdom.

In 2023, he was nominated for a BAFTA for cinematography for his work on the Netflix/Sky Nature co-production Predators.

== Education ==
Nicholls was a student at the Newcastle Royal Grammar School between 2006 and 2013. He then studied Zoology at the University of Exeter in England between 2014 and 2017.

== Career ==
Nicholls started taking pictures of wildlife when he was 12 years old. He has traveled across the United Kingdom, Cambodia, Amazonia, Nepal and other locations as a photographer and wildlife documentary maker. He has been interviewed by Live ‘n’ Deadly, BBC Countryfile and BBC News.

In 2015, Prince Harry spent time in a wildlife hide with Nicholls in search of red squirrels as part of a visit to learn about red squirrel conservation in the area. Nicholls has been involved in red squirrel (Sciurus vulgaris) conservation for a number of years, as the species is endangered in the United Kingdom.

== Nature TTL ==
Nicholls runs a free resource called Nature TTL, for nature photographers, which contains contributions and instructional articles by photographers. In 2019, Nature TTL launched the inaugural Nature TTL Photographer of the Year competition.

== Awards ==
- 2009: Overall winner, Young British Wildlife Photographer of the Year, British Wildlife Photography Awards
- 2011: Overall winner, RSPCA Young Photographer Awards
- 2023: BAFTA TV Craft Awards nominee. Photography: Factual.

== Publications ==
- On the Trail of Red Squirrels, Hexham, UK: Wagtail, 2013. ISBN 978-0955939525.
