= Crocombe =

Crocombe is a surname. Notable people include:

- Avis Crocombe (1838–1927), British cookery writer
- Ron Crocombe (1929–2009), professor of pacific studies at the University of the South Pacific
- Max Crocombe (born 1993), New Zealand footballer
- Juli Crocombe, consultant psychiatrist
- Marjorie Crocombe (born 1950), author and academic from the Cook Islands
