= Wales Autism Research Centre =

Cardiff University, UK research centre

Wales Autism Research Centre (WARC) is a research centre within Cardiff University, Wales. Focused on autism research, it collaborates with other university departments, the government and autism advocacy organizations. The center opened on 23 September 2010. Professor Sue Leekam is the Centre director and Cardiff University's Autism Chair.

== Mission ==
The centre's mission is: "To create positive change for individuals and families affected with autism by

- advancing scientific research in areas of risk factors, early identification, diagnosis, cognitive development and intervention and
- working in partnership with practitioners, charities and the Welsh Assembly Government to integrate scientific evidence with policy and practice."

== See also ==
Information about organisations that they collaborate with:

- Autism Cymru
- Autism Speaks
- Welsh Government
