= Léo Gantelet =

French poet (1940–2025)

- Born: 30 June 1940; Seynod, France
- Died: 25 August 2025 (aged 85)
- Occupation: Poet

Léo Gantelet (30 June 1940 – 25 August 2025) was a French poet.

After spending his early career as a computer scientist, he co-founded the firm Sopra and dedicated his life to publishing poetry.

Gantelet died on 25 August 2025, at the age of 85.

== Publications ==
- Unique Langage (1991)
- Une traduction d’un poème (1000 vers) de l’Anglais Alfred Tennyson : Enoch Arden (1993)
- Livre illustré de photos sur la Haute-Savoie (1995)
- Pourquoi (1997)
- En si bon chemin... Vers Compostelle (2003)
- Dis-moi, Lac… (2004)
- Chevaux de légendes (2005)
- Perles d'océan (2007)
- Shikoku, les 88 Temples de la Sagesse (2008)
- En si bon chemin... Vers Compostelle (2009)
- Le Chemin idéal (2010)
