= Dina St Johnston =

British software producer

- fair use image
- Born: Aldrina Nia Vaughan; 20 September 1930; South London, England
- Died: 30 June/1 July 2007 (aged 76)
- Education: London University
- Occupation: Software producer
- Spouse: Andrew St Johnston

Dina St Johnston (née Aldrina Nia Vaughan; 20 September 1930 – 30 June/1 July 2007) was a British computer programmer credited with founding the UK's first software house in 1959.

== Early life and education ==
Born Aldrina Nia Vaughan in south London, St Johnston was educated at Selhurst Grammar School for Girls before leaving school at 16 or 17 (accounts vary) to work for the British Non-Ferrous Metals Research Association. St Johnston worked and studied part-time, studying at Croydon Polytechnic and later Sir John Cass College before gaining an external London University degree in mathematics.

== Early career ==
In 1953, St Johnston left the British Non-Ferrous Metals Research Association and joined Borehamwood Laboratories of Elliott Brothers (London) Ltd, where she worked in the Theory Division. The company was an early computer company and had produced its first computer in 1950. St Johnston learned to programme at the company and also at the 1954 Cambridge Summer School on Programming and, showing a real flair for programming, began working on EDSAC and the Elliott 400 and 800 series computers. By 1954, she was responsible for the programming of the Elliott 153 Direction Finding (DF) digital computer for the Admiralty and soon after for programming Elliott's own payroll computer; her work was said to have been inventive and structured, but also very accurate, hardly ever requiring 'de-bugging'.

== Vaughan Computers ==
Shortly after her marriage to Andrew St Johnston – head of the Elliott computing department – in 1958, she founded Vaughan Programming Services (VPS) in Ware, Hertfordshire in 1959, performing software contracts, training and hiring additional programmers as needed. On its tenth anniversary in 1969, company literature stated that "VPS was the first registered independent Software unit in the UK (February 1959), that was not a part of a computer manufacturer, not a part of a computer bureau, not a part of a users' organisation and not a part of a consultancy operation." Significant contracts came to St Johnston and VPS, such as programming early nuclear power stations, but in 1970 she branched out into hardware, producing her own computer, the 4M, and the company changed its name to Vaughan Systems and Programming in 1975 to reflect the new area of work. One of the 4M Vaughan computers is in The National Museum of Computing.

St Johnston and her company, Vaughan, produced software for companies like the BBC, Unilever, and GEC, flight simulators for the RAF and software that provided real-time information for passengers on British Rail, the type of work for which the company became most well known. The company became well known for transport signalling and display systems.

== Later life ==
In 1996, Vaughan Systems and Programming was sold to Harmon Industries, an American railway signalling company.

St Johnston continued programming until the mid-1990s. She retired in 1999 and died on 30 June/1 July 2007, aged 86

== See also ==
- Steve Shirley
