= CIMPA =

- Industry: PLM Consulting and Services
- Headquarters: CIMPA S.A.S., Blagnac, France; CIMPA GmbH, Hamburg, Germany; CIMPA Ltd., Filton/Bristol, England
- Revenue: 124 Million € in 2019
- Number of employees: approx. 1400 (31.12.2019) in France, Germany, UK and Spain
- Website: cimpa.com

CIMPA is a product lifecycle management consulting and services subsidiary of Sopra Steria headquartered in Blagnac, France. CIMPA operates in the aerospace and defense industry as well as automotive, energy and transportation.

CIMPA's annual turnover was €124 million in 2019. It was founded in 1995 as a fully owned subsidiary of Airbus and then was sold to Sopra Steria in 2015.

== History ==
CIMPA was founded in 1995 as a spin-off by employees of the Corporate Research Center of Aerospatiale (now Airbus) in Suresnes, France.

Since October 2015, CIMPA has been a 100%-owned subsidiary of Sopra Steria Group.
