= Juli Crocombe =

British psychiatrist

Juli Crocombe is a consultant psychiatrist and specialist in autism. She has been appointed director of clinical services and research for the charity Caudwell Children. She was formerly clinical director for autistic spectrum disorders at St Andrew's Healthcare and before that a consultant psychiatrist for South Staffordshire and Shropshire Healthcare NHS Foundation Trust. She is chairperson of the All Party Parliamentary Group on Autism.
