= Quality policy =

In quality management system, a quality policy is a document developed by management to express the directive of the top management with respect to quality. Quality policy management is a strategic item.

Section 5.2 of the ISO 9001:2015 standard requires a written, well-defined quality policy that is communicated and understood within an organization. Section 5.2 also sets out some of the requirements for quality policies.

== See also ==
- ISO 9000
- Quality circle
- Total quality management
