= Hilary Cropper =

British businesswoman

Dame Hilary Cropper CBE
- Born: Hilary Mary Trueman; 9 January 1941; Macclesfield, England
- Died: 26 December 2004 (aged 63)
- Education: University of Salford (BSc Mathematics)
- Occupations: Businesswoman, executive
- Employer(s): FI Group (later Xansa); International Computers Limited (ICL)
- Awards: Fellow of the British Computer Society; Fellow of the Royal Society of Arts

Dame Hilary Mary Cropper (née Trueman; 9 January 1941 – 26 December 2004) was a British businesswoman.

== Early life ==
Hilary Mary Trueman was born in Macclesfield on 9 January 1941, the daughter of Arnold Trueman and his wife Madeline Emily, née Sutton. In 1963, she married Peter John Cropper and they had three children: one son and two daughters. Cropper read mathematics at the University of Salford, graduating with a Bachelor of Science (BSc) degree, before joining an engineering company based in Trafford Park making turbines; she would later recall that there were only three women in a company dominated by men. This drew scrutiny of her work: she told an interviewer in 2002 that "If you weren't better than the average guy, you weren't going to get on", but she added "It kept you sharp".

== Career and later life ==
In 1970, Cropper moved to the computer mainframe manufacturers International Computers Limited (ICL); although initially working in part-time positions to help raise her children, she was later promoted to senior management roles, eventually becoming the male-dominated company's most senior woman. In 1985, she was headhunted by FI Group, which later became Xansa, to manage its UK operations as chief executive, a position she served in until 2000; between then and 2002, she was the company's executive chairman (for a year following, she was also non-executive chairman). During her tenure as chief executive and the chairman, the company's annual revenues grew from £7m to £450m in 2003; she was integral to the company's recovery and growth after the Dot-com bubble burst in the early 2000s, responding to the downturn by re-positioning the company to meet the growing demand for outsourced IT work. In 1991, Cropper led a management buy-out of the company and a large number of staff became the owners of company shares. It was in turn floated on the stock exchange in 1996 and many of those staff who had kept their shares (about 100 in all) became millionaires. Cropper herself was among the highest-paid women in the United Kingdom for a time: she was paid £17.4m in 1999.

Cropper held a host of other positions. She was a non-executive director on the board of TSB (1987–90), London First (1996–99) and Barclays (from 1998), and the Post Office. She was a member of the Financial Reporting Council between 1997 and 2003, and also sat on the New Deal Taskforce, the National Employment Panel and the Security Commission. Outside of business, Cropper was a Governor of the University of Hertfordshire between 1995 and 2000, a Freeman of the City of London, and a Fellow of the British Computer Society and of Royal Society of Arts. She had been appointed a Commander of the Order of the British Empire (CBE) in 1999 and was promoted to Dame Commander (DBE) in 2004.

In 2001, she was diagnosed with ovarian cancer, but kept the illness from her colleagues while initially receiving treatment. She then announced her retirement in 2003 and died of the illness on 26 December 2004.
