= Pierre Pasquier (businessman) =

French businessman (born 1935)

- Born: August 20, 1935
- Education: University of Rennes
- Employer: Sopra Group
- Title: CEO

Pierre Pasquier (born August 20, 1935) is the CEO and co-founder of Sopra Steria, as well as the chairman of its subsidiary, Axway. He has been instrumental in building and developing Sopra Group into a systems and solutions integration company, and he has some 40 years’ experience in executive management and development of IT services.

== Education ==
In 1962, Pasquier graduated from the University of Rennes with a bachelor's degree in Mathematics.

== Career ==
In the early and mid-1960s, Pasquier worked for Bull, a subsidiary of General Electric. When GE lost interest in developing mainframes and “big” business machines, he left the company, and in 1968, Pasquier, François Odin and Leo Gantelet opened Sopra Group operations in Annecy, France. The young company participated in the creation of the IT Services industry. It developed IT services offerings in the banking, utilities, services, telecom, retail, and public sectors, and proprietary solutions for the banking, human resources, and real estate sectors. Internal growth and client demand spurred the establishment of numerous agencies in all major French cities. By 1985, Sopra Group began expanding into other European countries, and in 1990, the company was listed on the Paris Bourse.
