= Rosa Buchthal =

German Politician

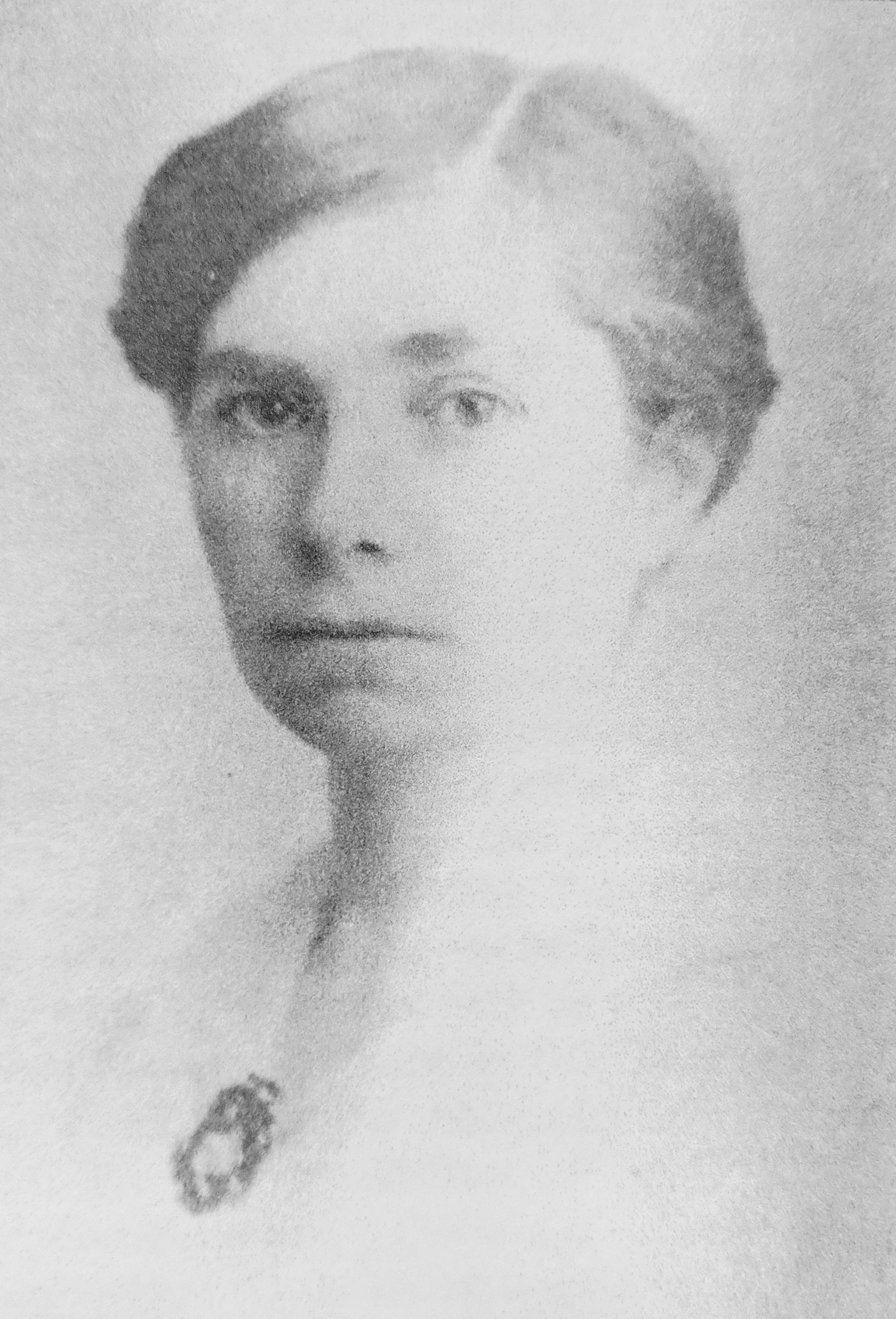
- Rosa Buchthal, undated, probably around 1900
- Born: Rosa Dalberg; 31 July 1874; Marsberg, German Empire
- Died: 31 December 1958 (aged 84); Amsterdam, Netherlands
- Occupations: Politician; women's rights activist; businesswoman
- Known for: First woman elected to the Dortmund city council
- Spouse: Felix Buchthal (m. 1895; d. 1921)
- Children: Alice Buchthal; Arnold Buchthal

Rosa Buchthal (née Dalberg; 31 July 1874 – 31 December 1958) was a German politician and a fighter for women's rights. She was the first woman to be elected to the Dortmund city council.

== Life ==
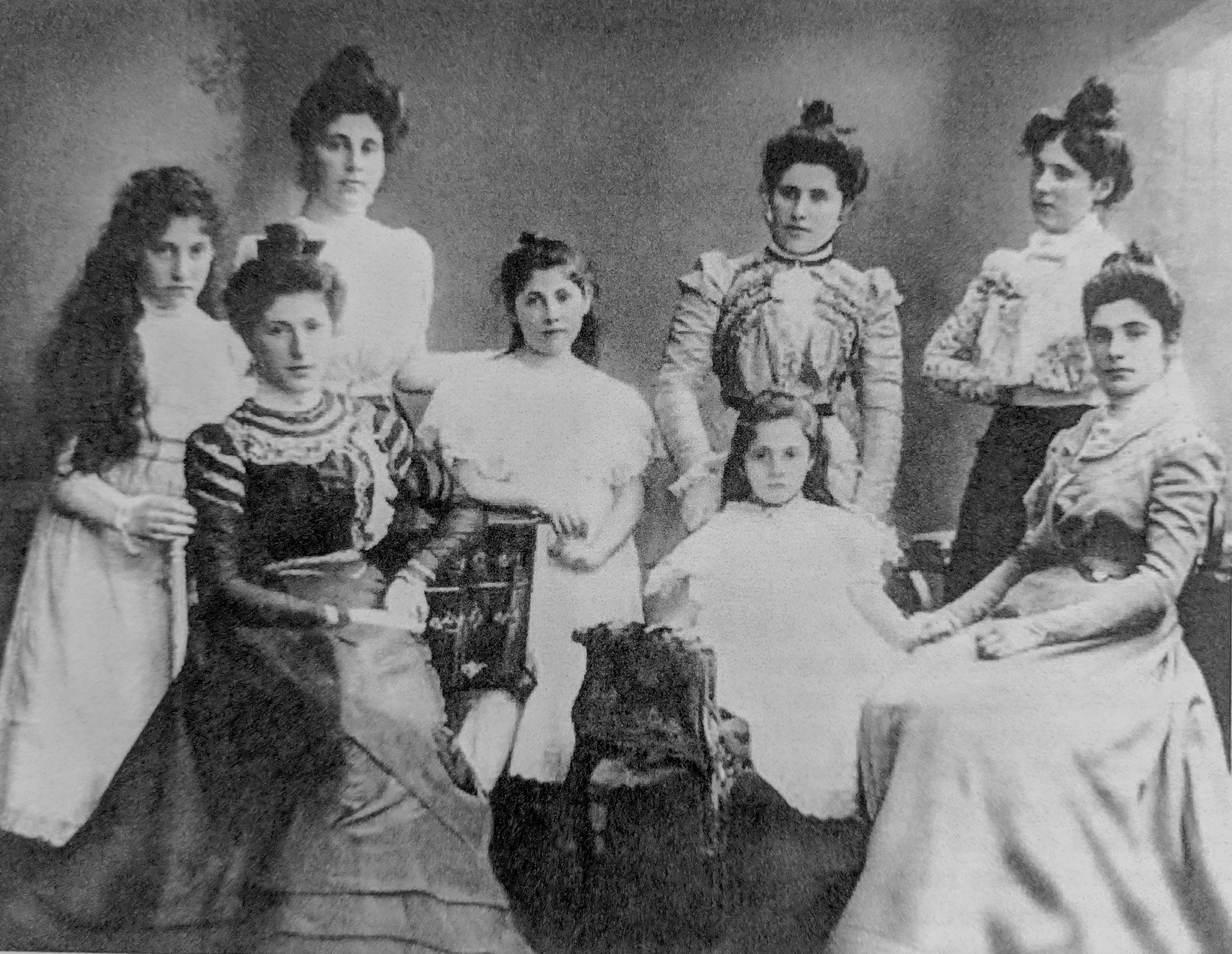
Rosa Buchthal (right) with all her sisters, ca. 1895

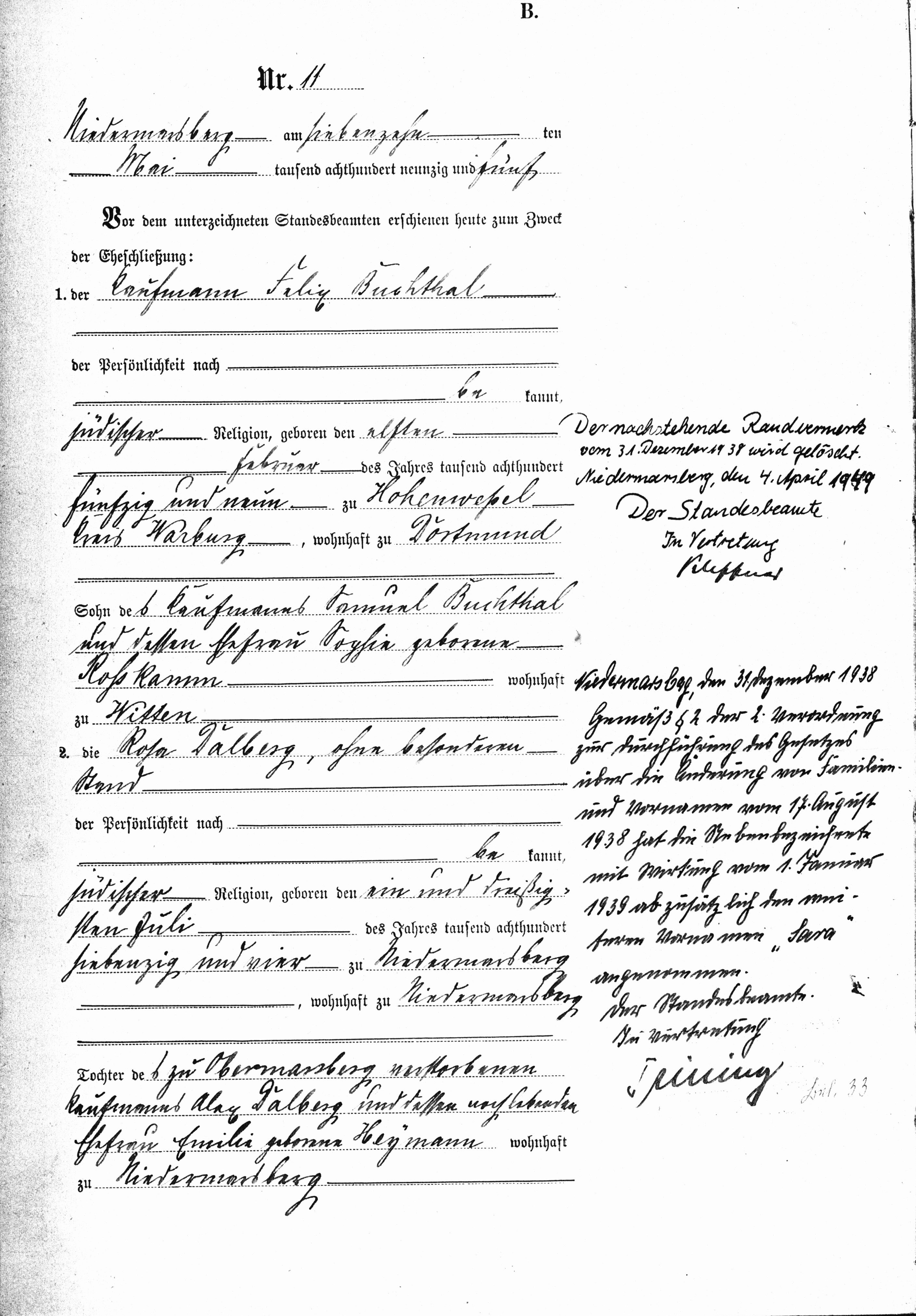
Marriage certificate, 1895

Rosa Dalberg was the eldest of eight daughters of a respected Jewish couple Emilie (born Heymann) and Abraham/Alexander Dalberg living in Marsberg, Sauerland, Germany. When she was born in 1874, her parents sold cattle and fabrics. They lived on the main street of Niedermarsberg in a neoclassical style villa. After attending the girls' school in Marsberg she married Felix Buchthal († 1921), the Jewish owner of a coffee house trading coffee and chocolate in Dortmund. In 1894 "Buchthal u. Comp." moved into a new house in Bornstr. 19. The company had several coffee shops in the city, and Rosa was, unusual for that time, not a housewife but the co-managing director. Felix and Rosa had two children, Alice (born 17 February 1896) and Arnold (born 18 November 1900).

== Politician in Dortmund ==
Dortmund grew in the last quarter of the 19th century into a metropolis with 142,000 inhabitants in 1900 and was the centre for many political activities. Women were socially and politically active, forming groups, despite not having the right to vote yet. In 1908 Rosa Buchthal, along with several others, formed the "Association of Liberal Women". Two years later, she became their chairwoman. The group had strong conservative values supporting military service, but pleaded for the abolition of the death penalty. They opposed civil servants' celibacy (where a woman lost her civil service status when she married), the morality paragraph (which effectively gave men carte blanche), and they campaigned for animal welfare and the rights of dementia sufferers.

When the First World War broke out in 1914, the coffee business started to struggle and Rosa decided to go into politics. In 1915, she became Head of the Information Office for Women's Professions in the Dortmund Chamber of Commerce in the Employment Office, 1918 "Social Auxiliary Officer". After the war, in 1919, women were allowed to vote for the first time in the German Reich. She joined the German Democratic Party DDP, became its Deputy in Dortmund and on 27 October 1919 (elected on 22 September 22) she became an unpaid member of the Municipal Authority, sworn in on 20 April 1920 by the Lord Mayor and again on 4 May 1921, this time according to Article 78 of the Prussian Constitution. Until 1925, she was the only woman on the city council. She was re-elected in 1925, for the final time.

When the National Socialists seized power in 1933, just one percent of the Dortmund population was Jewish. Rosa Buchthal's son Arnold had studied law and was a judge in Dortmund. In 1933 he lost this post under the Nazis. On 16 September in the same year, his second daughter, Vera Buchthal, was born. In July 1939, the parents sent their two daughters Renate and Vera on the Kindertransport from Vienna to England. Vera Buchthal later became Stephanie Shirley and founded the first, all women software houses in Europe in 1962, who received the honours of Dame Commander of the Order of the British Empire and Companion of Honour from Queen Elizabeth II, acquiring the style 'Dame Stephanie Shirley CH DBE'. Her father, Arnold Buchthal, the son of Felix and Rosa, survived the Second World War, became Hessian Attorney General and in 1957, he was a judge in Darmstadt.

== Escape to the Netherlands ==
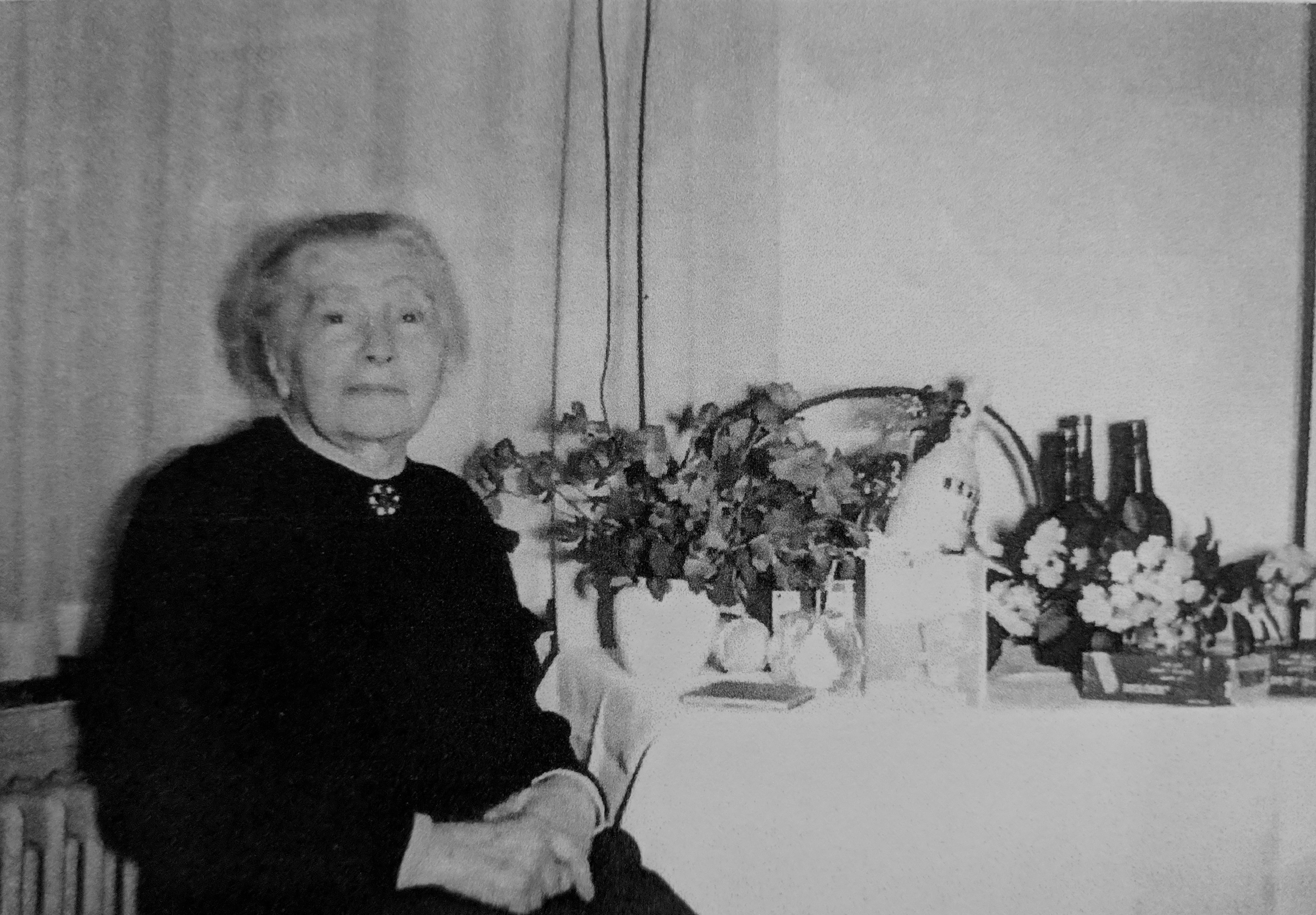
81st birthday, Amsterdam 1955

On her 61st birthday in 1935 in Amsterdam, Rosa Buchthal, like all Jewish women registered in the Nazi regime, had to accept the additional first name Sara. The registration office issued this on 6 July 1937.

In 1939, she gave her silverware to her friend Else van Roseven, a cheese merchant in Dortmund, who sent the parcel to one of Rosa's brothers in law Bob de Vries in Amsterdam, where it never arrived. In August she escaped to the then non-Nazi-occupied Netherlands. When she arrived at the border in Emmerich on 29 August, she was rejected by the Dutch officials. It was not until 6 May 1940 that she managed to enter the country. There was a Nazi raid a few days later and almost all Jews living in Holland were captured and deported, the rest were murdered. Rosa was arrested, but managed to get herself released by bribing the guards and spent the rest of the war living in the cellar of a farm belonging to a family, whom she had not known before, coming out only at night. According to her granddaughter Vera, she later joked that she had taken the precaution of packing her knitting to have something to do in the basement during the day.

On 2 January 1947, from Amsterdam, she wrote to her son Arnold in Offenbach asking him to represent her in all matters of property law. She gave her address as living at Van Tuyll van Serooskerkenweg 43 and later in 1958 at van Eegenstraat 64. She was stateless.

After the war, Rosa Buchthal came just once to England. She died of cancer in a hospice in Amsterdam in 1958 and is buried in the city. She left behind 7290.59 DM to her daughter Alice, who then lived in the Dutch town of 's Hertogenbosch.

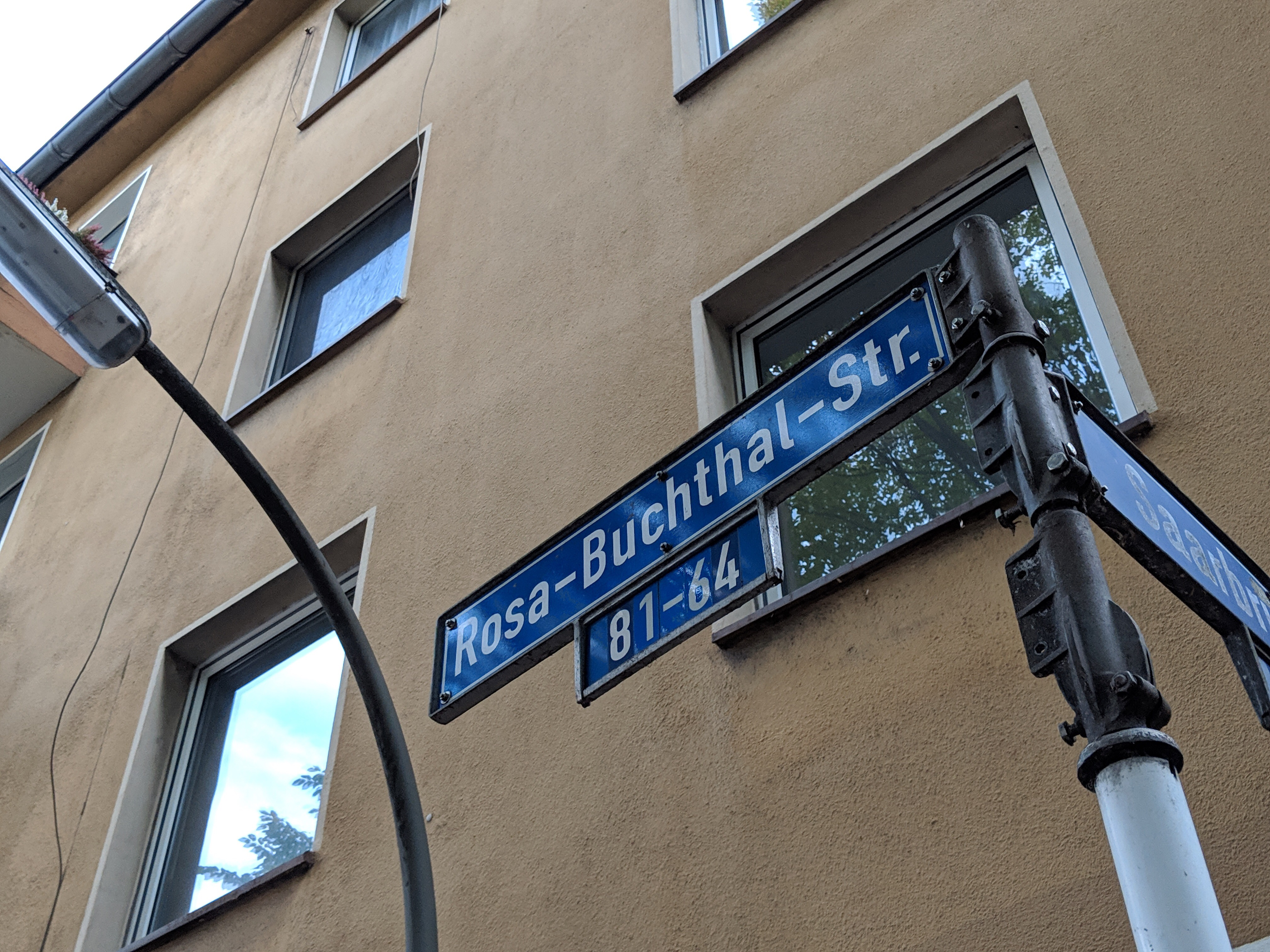
Rosa-Buchthal-Straße, Dortmund

In 2010, the city centre of Dortmund renamed the Schwanenstraße to Rosa Buchthal Straße.

== Main sources ==
- Stadtarchiv Dortmund (Dortmund city archive)
- Heiratsregister Marsberg (Marriage register von the town of Marsberg)
- Rosa Buchthal – Eine Sauerländerin als erste Stadträtin Dortmunds in der Weimarer Republik. Kreisarchiv des Hochsauerlandkreises, 2012
- Private archive of Dame Stephanie Shirley
