= Eugen Buchthal =

German Jewish businessman (1878–1954)

- Born: 11 March 1878; Berlin
- Died: 1954 (aged 75–76)
- Occupation: German Jewish businessman

Eugen Moritz Buchthal (11 March 1878 – 1954) was a German Jewish businessman and art collector persecuted by the Nazis.

== Life ==
Born on 11 March 1878 in Berlin, Buchthal ran a clothes manufacturing and fashion company, Seeler-Herrmann-Damenmäntel- und Kleiderfabrik & Co., in Berlin. His home was known as the Villa Buchthal. In 1909, Eugen Buchthal married Therese (Thea) Wolff and they had three children: Hugo (born 1909), Anne Gerda (born 1913) and Wolfgang Heinrich (born 1922).

== Art collector and patron of the arts ==
The Buchthals had an important art collection, supported artists and loaned artworks to the National Museum in Berlin. Their collection included works by Otto Müller, Emil Nolde, Lyonel Feininger, Wilhelm Lehmbruck and Franz Marc.

== Nazi persecution ==
When the Nazis came to power in 1933, Buchthal and his family were persecuted because of his Jewish heritage even though he was assimilated. In 1936, Villa Buchthal was acquired by Dr. Bruno Bruhn, Generaldirektor der Krupp AG and the Buchthals emigrated to London.

== Claims for restitution for looted artworks ==
In 2017 the Stiftung Preußischer Kulturbesitz restituted nine artworks to his heirs. The heirs of Eugen and Thea Buchthal have registered 141 search requests on the German Lost Art Foundation website for artworks lost due to Nazi persecution.

== See also ==
- Aryanization
- Degenerate art
- The Holocaust
- List of Claims for Restitution for Nazi-looted art
