= All-Party Parliamentary Group on Autism =

UK parliamentary group

The All Party Parliamentary Group on Autism (APPGA) is a group of backbench members of the British Parliament and Peers interested in autism spectrum disorders. The Chair Marie Tidball MP and Officers are elected by the Members of the Group at an annual AGM. The former Chair was Cheryl Gillan, who was the MP responsible for taking the Autism Act 2009 through the Houses of Parliament.

The APPGA was founded in 2000 by Dame Stephanie Shirley CH. Its secretariat is provided by the National Autistic Society.

An Advisory group exists for the APPGA, composed of experts and autistic individuals who are experts in their respective fields. It is chaired by Phillip Hanscombe (RNLD, Expert by Experience).
