= Sopra Steria =

French technology company

Sopra Steria Group SA
- Type: Société Anonyme
- Traded as: Euronext Paris: SOP; CAC Mid 60 Component
- ISIN: FR0000050809
- Industry: Information technology consulting and services
- Founded: 1968; 58 years ago
- Headquarters: Paris, France
- Key people: Pierre Pasquier (Chairman); Cyril Malargé (CEO); Laurent Giovachini (Deputy CEO)
- Revenue: ▲€5.64 billion (2025)
- Operating income: ▼€534.3 million (2025)
- Net income: ▲€296.8 million (2025)
- Total assets: ▲€3.30 billion (2025)
- Total equity: ▲€2.14 billion (2025)
- Number of employees: 58,000 (14 June 2024)
- Website: soprasteria.com

Sopra Steria is a European-based consulting, digital services, and software development company with 50,000 consultants. The company is headquartered in Paris and has operations in several countries in Western Europe.

Sopra Steria has a new consulting wing under the "Next" brand. It employs 3,400 consultants across Europe, including 1,900 in the group's native France. After adding the shares held directly in registered form by current and former Group employees, these proportions amount to nearly 10% of the share capital and 13% of voting rights, thereby making employees the Group's second-largest shareholder.

== History ==
Sopra was created in 1968, followed closely by the 1969 founding of Steria. SODERI (Information Research and Development Company) holds 51%, the BNP Group holds 29.5% and the Indochina Group holds 19.5%.

By 1971, Sopra signed its first large global banking managed services agreement, which led to the first banking platform the following year. Steria computerized Agence France-Presse in 1973 by creating a text processing system that enables real-time information transmission. After acquiring Sitintel in 1974, the group developed Minitel and eventually received its first major national project with the French Ministry of the Interior in 1986.

Steria's automation project for the RER A in Paris made it valuable enough to be registered on the Second Market of the Paris stock exchange (now the NYSE Euronext Paris) by 1990. Sopra set up its subsidiary, Axway Software, in 2001, through which the company expanded into the Enterprise Application Integration (EAI) market.

In 2014, Sopra and Steria officially merged into the Sopra Steria Group in August. On 31 December 2014, the legal merger of the two groups was completed. After the merger, Sopra Steria acquired CX-partners in 2019 and Fidor Solutions in 2020.

=== Sopra ===
Logo of Sopra. The motto of the company was Talented together.

Sopra was seated in Annecy, France. The company had a revenue of €1.349 billion (2013) and 16,290 (Dec. 2013) employees. It was founded in January 1968 by Pierre Pasquier, François Odin and Léo Gantelet. In March 2014, Sopra Group was renamed Sopra. In April 2014, Sopra announced a merger with Steria in an attempt to become the European leader in computer services. Sopra is a consulting, IT services, and software development company. Its subsidiary Sopra Banking Software develops and distributes software for the financial services market.

In September 2024, Sopra Steria divested Sopra Banking Software to Axway in a transaction valued at €330 million. Following the acquisition, the company was rebranded as SBS in October 2024.

Sopra runs three complementary business lines: consulting management and technology, systems integration, and software publishing in the following field in human resources and real estate management.

==== Acquisitions ====
Sopra's main acquisitions are:

- SG2 Ingénierie (1996)
- Orga Consultants (2000)
- ITI and CS Rand (2001)
- Inforsud Ingénierie from the Crédit Agricole Group (2003)
- Valoris (2004)
- Newell & Budge (UK) and its subsidiaries in Ireland and India, IT services (2005)
- 100% of the share capital of PROFit SA (2005)
- CIBF (2008)
- 100% of the share capital of Delta Informatique (2011)
- Callataÿ & Wouters (2012)
- Callataÿ & Wouters and Delta Informatique (2012)
- British subsidiaries of Business & Decision and Tieto (2012)
- HR Access (2013)
- COR&FJA Banking Solutions (2014)
- CIMPA (2015)
- Cassiopae (2017)
- Kentor (2017)
- 2MoRO (2017)
- Galitt (2017)
- BLUECARAT (2018)
- Sword Apak (2018)
- SAB (2019)
- Sodifrance (2020)
- Fidor Solutions (Fidor Bank) (2020)
- EVA Group (2021)
- EGGS Design (2021)
- Labs (2021)
- CS Group (2022)
- Ordina and Tobania (2023)
- MarinIT (2023)
- Shared Services Connected Ltd (SSCL)

==== Axway Software ====
In 2001, Sopra used its subsidiary Axway to access the EAI market. The following year, Axway acquired Viewlocity Inc. From 2006 to 2008, it acquired Cyclone Commerce, Inc., Atos Origin, and Tumbleweed Communications Corp.

Axway Software split from Sopra in June 2011 after its stock market launch.

=== Steria ===
Logo of Steria

Groupe Steria SCA was a multinational information technology services company founded in 1969, based in Issy-les-Moulineaux, France. It focused on public services, finance, telecommunications, utilities and transport, and provided consulting services for its clients' core business processes.

Steria was created by Jean Carteron in 1969. Francois Enaud took over as chairman and CEO in 1998 and Steria listed itself on the Paris Stock Exchange the next year. In 2000, Steria acquired three service and telecom companies in France and became one of the top five French service providers. In 2001, Steria started the Foundation Steria, a community support group. In July 2007, Steria acquired the United Kingdom-based IT outsourcing and technology company Xansa for £472 million in cash.

Steria had sites in Austria, Belgium, Denmark, France, Germany, Hong Kong, India, Luxembourg, Morocco, Norway, Poland, Singapore, Switzerland, Sweden and the United Kingdom.

In May 2018, the UK's Minister of State for Immigration, Caroline Nokes, announced significant changes to the visa application submission process. In her statement, she announced the government would be outsourcing the immigration application process to Sopra Steria Group by October 2018.

== Controversies ==
In the UK, the National Audit Office found that NHS SBS first recognized in January 2014 that patients might have come to harm as a result of what was, at the time, a growing backlog of undelivered paperwork. Although staff raised concerns, the company did not alert the department or NHS England until March 2016. The NAO concluded that the company had been "obstructive and unhelpful" with regard to the subsequent inquiry launched by NHS England. In 2017, a UK Commons public accounts committee was informed that at least 12,000 missing papers – possibly including patient records and cancer tests – had not been processed by the company.

In 2019, several members of the British Parliament, concerned about "grave problems" in Sopra Steria's £91 million contract to manage post-Brexit biometric services for immigrants, wrote to the National Audit Office to request an urgent investigation into the quality of service, responding to allegations that the company was charging "extortionate" rates to the vulnerable.

In 2021, Belgium signed a contract with Sopra Steria for the unification and modernization of various legacy police databases into a modern system, "i-Police". The project was canceled near the end of 2025 without any tangible results, after 76 million EUR had been paid out to Sopra Steria. Internal police reports lamented that after several years Sopra Steria still lacked essential technical knowledge about the main databases involved.

== Ransomware attack ==
On 20 October 2020, the company suffered a Ryuk ransomware attack. Using a new variant of Ryuk, the cybercriminals unsuccessfully tried to encrypt the company's data, making it inaccessible unless a ransom is paid. Ryuk has been described as "one of the most dangerous ransomware groups that operate through phishing campaigns".
