= Autistica =

British charitable organisation

- Founded: 2004 (22 years ago)
- Founder: Dame Stephanie Shirley
- Headquarters: London, UK
- Revenue: 3,593,349 pound sterling (2017)
- Number of employees: 15 (2017, 2018)
- Website: www.autistica.org.uk

Autistica is a United Kingdom-based charity that funds research and campaigns related to autism. The organisation focuses its research on the physical health, mental health and social barriers experienced by autistic individuals.

== History ==
Entrepreneur and philanthropist Dame Stephanie Shirley founded the organisation in 2004. It originally operated as the UK affiliate to the US charity Autism Speaks. In March 2007, the charity became a fully independent entity. In January 2010, the organisation officially changed its name from Autism Speaks UK to Autistica. This name change was made to distinguish the British charity from the US organisation, and to reflect its specific focus on scientific research. Autistica is registered operates in England and Wales.

== Research Approach ==
Autistica partners with scientific and academic institutions to fund studies. They often utilise participatory science models, meaning autistic individuals are directly involved in designing and contributing to the research.

== Activities ==
Autistica funds medical research to understand the causes of autism, improve diagnosis, and develop new treatments and interventions. They are the UK's leading autism medical research charity.

Their current scientific priorities are to:

- Bring down the average age of diagnosis and develop early interventions that can improve the outlook of autistic people.
- Improve the quality of life for young people and autistic adults by understanding the additional physical and mental health issues that many individuals experience and ensure the development of effective treatments.
- Support autistic adults by improving the understanding of how autism changes over the lifespan and making sure that adult-specific needs are addressed.

=== Fundraising ===
In 2009, Autistica provided a total of £940,000 to its beneficiaries in autism research.

== Notable members and participants ==
- Michael Rutter
- Stephanie Shirley
- Michael Fitzpatrick
- Bridget Ogilvie
- Ann Olivarius
- Jane Asher (vice-president)
