= British Wildlife Photography Awards =

Annual photographic competition

- Awarded for: Wildlife photography
- Country: United Kingdom
- Reward: £5000
- First award: 2009
- Currently held by: Charlie Page
- Website: http://bwpawards.org

The British Wildlife Photography Awards is an annual photographic competition established in 2009. It features images of wild species and habitats taken in the United Kingdom, the Isle of Man, or the Channel Islands. The competition is followed by a national tour, displaying winning and commended photographs in regional galleries and venues.

Since 2010, a book of winning entries has been published annually by AA Publishing. In 2019 the Coast and Marine category part of the competition was expanded to include entrants from: the Coast of Ireland, England, Northern Ireland, Wales and Scotland.

== Overall winners ==
- 2009 Ross Hoddinott
- 2010 Steve Young
- 2011 Richard Shucksmith
- 2012 Matt Doggett
- 2013 George Karbusa
- 2014 Lee Acaster
- 2015 Barrie Williams
- 2016 George Stoyle
- 2017 Daniel Trim
- 2018 Paul Colley
- 2019 Daniel Trim
- 2023 Charlie Page
