= Steve Shirley =

British businesswoman (1933–2025)

Dame Stephanie Shirley CH DBE FREng DFBCS
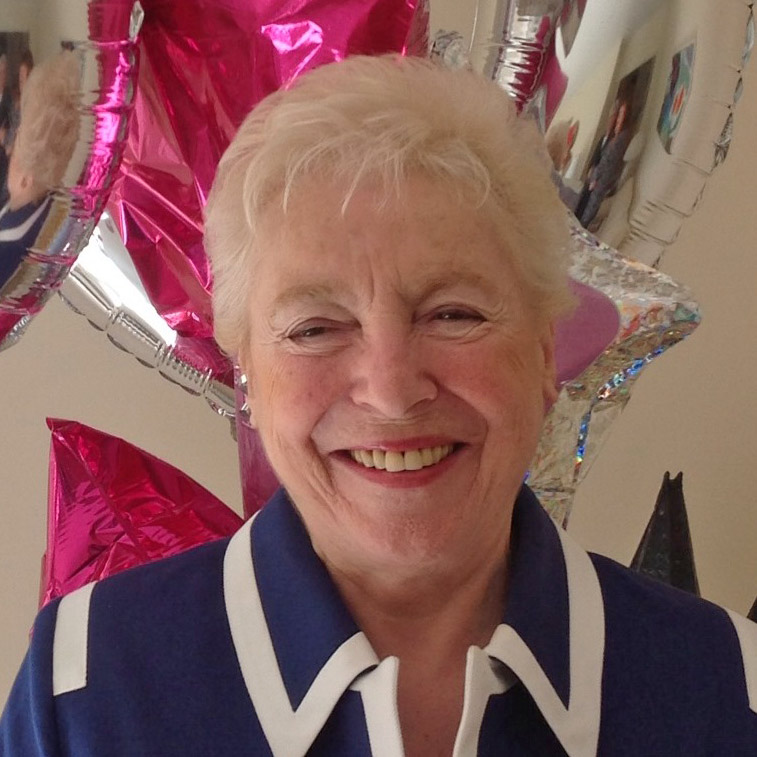
- Shirley in 2013
- Born: Vera Buchthal; 16 September 1933; Dortmund, Germany
- Died: 9 August 2025 (aged 91); Reading, England
- Other names: Vera Stephanie Buchthal; Stephanie Brook
- Occupations: Businesswoman and philanthropist
- Organisations: Freelance Programmers; The Shirley Foundation; Oxford Internet Institute; Autistica
- Father: Arnold Buchthal
- Relatives: Rosa Buchthal (grandmother)
- Awards: FREng (2001); CHM Fellow (2018)
- Honours: Order of the British Empire; Companion of Honour
- Website: steveshirley.com

Steve Shirley's voice
Recorded May 2010 from the BBC Radio 4 programme Desert Island Discs

Dame Vera Stephanie Shirley (previously Brook, née Buchthal; 16 September 1933 – 9 August 2025) was a German-born British information technology pioneer, businesswoman and philanthropist.

== Life and career ==
Shirley was born Vera Buchthal to Arnold Buchthal, a judge in Dortmund who was Jewish and who lost his post to the Nazi regime, and Margaret (née Schick), a non-Jewish Viennese mother. Her paternal grandmother was politician and women's rights activist Rosa Buchthal. In July 1939, at the age of five, Shirley and her nine-year-old sister Renate travelled to Britain as Kindertransport child refugees.

She was fostered by parents in Sutton Coldfield. She was later re-united with her biological parents, but said she "never really bonded with them". Shirley attributed her early childhood trauma as being the driving force behind her ability to keep up with changes in her life and career.

After attending a convent school, she moved to Oswestry where she attended the Oswestry Girls' High School. Mathematics was not taught at the school, so she received permission after assessment to take those lessons at the local boys school. She would later recall that, after her Kindertransport and wartime experiences, "in Oswestry I had five wonderful years of peace".

After leaving school, Shirley decided not to go to university (botany was the "only science then available to my gender") but sought employment in a mathematics/technical environment. At the age of 18, she became a British citizen and changed her name to Stephanie Brook.

In the 1950s, she worked at the Post Office Research Station at Dollis Hill, building computers from scratch and writing code in machine language. She took evening classes for six years to obtain an honours degree in mathematics. In 1959, she moved to CDL Ltd, designers of the ICT 1301 computer.

After her marriage to physicist Derek Shirley in 1959, Shirley founded the software company Freelance Programmers with a capital of £6. Having experienced sexism in her workplace, "being fondled, being pushed against the wall", she wanted to create job opportunities for women with dependents, and predominantly employed women, with only three male programmers in the first 300 staff, until the Sex Discrimination Act 1975 made that practice illegal. The company was also innovative in that its employees worked part time and from home, so that they could better juggle family responsibilities; Shirley regarded the company as a social endeavor as well as a business. She also adopted the name "Steve" to help her in the male-dominated business world, given that company letters signed using her real name were not responded to. Her team's projects included programming Concorde's black box flight recorder.

She served as an independent non-executive director for Tandem Computers Inc., the Atomic Energy Authority (later AEA Technology) and the John Lewis Partnership.

Shirley retired in 1993 at the age of 60, and focused on philanthropy. She died aged 91 in a nursing home in Reading, Berkshire, England, on 9 August 2025.

== Philanthropy ==
The Shirley Foundation, based in the UK, was set up by Shirley in 1986 with a substantial gift to establish a charitable trust fund which spent out in 2018 in favour of Autistica. Its mission was facilitation and support of pioneering projects with strategic impact in the field of autism spectrum disorders with particular emphasis on medical research. The fund has supported many projects through grants and loans including: Autism at Kingwood which supports people with autism spectrum disorders to enjoy full and active lives; Prior's Court, the foundation's largest benefaction, with a residential school for 70 autistic pupils and Young Adult Centre for 20 autistic students; Autism99, the first online autism conference attended by 165,000 people from 33 countries. She addressed conferences around the world (many remotely) and was in frequent contact with parents, carers and those with autism spectrum disorders. Her autistic son Giles died following an epileptic seizure at the age of 35.

From May 2009 until May 2010, Shirley served as the UK's Ambassador for Philanthropy, a government appointment aimed at giving philanthropists a "voice".

In 2012, Shirley donated the entirety of her art collection, including works by Elisabeth Frink, Maggi Hambling, Thomas Heatherwick, Josef Herman and John Piper to Prior's Court School and the charity Paintings in Hospitals.

In 2013, appearing on BBC Radio 2's Good Morning Sunday with Clare Balding, Shirley discussed why she had given away more than £67 million of her personal wealth to different projects. In her 2012 memoirs Let IT Go, she writes "I do it because of my personal history; I need to justify the fact that my life was saved".

== Honours and legacy ==
Shirley received her BSc in 1956 and was appointed Officer of the Order of the British Empire (OBE) in the 1980 Birthday Honours for services to industry; Dame Commander of the Order of the British Empire (DBE) in the 2000 New Year Honours for services to information technology.; and Member of the Order of the Companions of Honour (CH) in the 2017 Birthday Honours for services to the IT industry and philanthropy.

In 1987, she gained the Freedom of the City of London. She was the first female President of the chartered British Computer Society from 1989 to 1990 and Master of the IT livery company 1992/93. In 1985, she was awarded a Recognition of Information Technology Award. In 1999, she received the Mountbatten Medal.

She was appointed a Fellow of the Royal Academy of Engineering and of Birkbeck College in 2001. In 2002 she was elected as Honorary Fellow at Murray Edwards College, University of Cambridge. At a ceremony at the Dome, Brighton East Sussex on April 25th, 2009, Dame Stephanie was awarded an Honary Doctorate by the Open University

She donated most of her wealth (from the internal sale to the company staff and later the flotation of FI Group) to charity. Beneficiaries include the Worshipful Company of Information Technologists and the Oxford Internet Institute, part of the Oxford University, through the Shirley Foundation. Her late son Giles (1963–1998) was autistic and she became an early member of the National Autistic Society. Via the charity Autistica she instigated and funded research in this field.

In 2003, Shirley received the Beacon Fellowship Prize for her contribution to autism research and for her pioneering work in harnessing information technology for the public good.

In 1991, Shirley was awarded an honorary doctorate from the University of Buckingham; later she was honoured by the University of Cambridge, and in 2022 by the University of Kent and 28 other UK Universities.

In February 2013, she was assessed as one of the 100 most powerful women in the United Kingdom by Woman's Hour on BBC Radio 4. She was also recognized as one of the BBC's 100 women of 2013.

In January 2014, the Science Council named Shirley as one of the "Top 100 practising scientists" in the UK.

In 2018, she was made a Fellow of the Computer History Museum, and became the first woman to win the Gold Medal of the Chartered Management Institute 'for her stellar contribution to British engineering and technology'.

In August 2021, Shirley unveiled a blue plaque in Oswestry commemorating her school years in the town, the plaque is located on The Broadwalk close to St Oswald's Parish Church.

In September 2021 Shirley unveiled a statue by Ian Wolter on Harwich Quay, Essex. It commemorates the arrival of the Kindertransport children at the port.

== Archive ==
In 2019, a donation from Shirley helped to establish the UK Philanthropy Archive based at the University of Kent Special Collections & Archives. In addition to the financial contribution Shirley also donated the records of The Shirley Foundation. The archive currently holds eight other collections in addition to the Shirley Foundation's records, and material is actively being acquired in order to establish better evidence of philanthropy and its impact.

== Books ==
- Let It Go: My Extraordinary Story – From Refugee to Entrepreneur to Philanthropist (with Richard Askwith, 2012, revised 2018) ISBN 978-0241395493
- My Family in Exile (2015) ISBN 978 0 85457 244 1
- So To Speak (2020), an anthology of 30 of Dame Stephanie's speeches ISBN 978 1 5272 6880 7
- Ein unmögliches Leben: Die außergewöhnliche Geschichte einer Frau, die die Regeln der Männer brach und ihren eigenen Weg ging (2020)
- Déjalo (2022) Ir Memorias de Dame Stephanie (Steve) Shirley La inspiradora biografia de una nińa refugiada que llega a ser millionaria, filintropán y Dama del Imperio Británico.

== See also ==
- Dina St Johnston
