= Deaths in February 2025 =

The following is a list of notable deaths in February 2025.

Entries for each day are listed alphabetically by surname. A typical entry lists information in the following sequence:

- Name, age, country of citizenship at birth, subsequent country of citizenship (if applicable), reason for notability, cause of death (if known), and reference.

== February 2025 ==
=== 1 ===
- Peter Bassano, 79, English trombonist ("Hey Jude") and conductor.
- Navin Chawla, 79, Indian civil servant, chief election commissioner (2009–2010).
- Renato Corsetti, 83, Italian Esperantist, president of the Universal Esperanto Association (2001–2007).
- André Ducret, 79, Swiss singer and composer.
- Alvin Franklin, 62, American basketball player.
- Willy Gómez, 74, Mexican footballer (Guadalajara, national team).
- Mehdi Haj Mohamad, 74, Iranian footballer (Taj, national team), cancer.
- Hugh Holland, 82, American photographer.
- Zakia Jafri, 87–88, Indian human rights activist.
- Kishan Kapoor, 73, Indian politician, MP (2019–2024) and Himachal Pradesh MLA (1990–1998).
- Patrick Kenny, 90, Irish Olympic boxer (1960).
- Horst Köhler, 81, German economist and politician, president (2004–2010).
- Ilias Kostopanagiotou, 81, Greek politician, MP (2015–2019).
- C. Richard Kramlich, 89, American venture capitalist and video art collector.
- Friedrich Kronenberg, 91, German politician, MP (1983–1990).
- Alberto Leguelé, 71, Brazilian footballer (Bahia, CSA, 1976 Olympics).
- Sal Maida, 76, American bassist (Milk 'N' Cookies, Roxy Music, Sparks), complications from a fall.
- Manfred Meinsen, 86, German politician, member of the Landtag of Lower Saxony (1982–1986).
- Velma Pollard, 87, Jamaican poet.
- Sigi Renz, 86, German racing cyclist, cancer.
- Bernard Rulach, 77, Sri Lankan cricketer (Colts).
- John Montagu, 11th Earl of Sandwich, 81, British aristocrat, businessman and politician, member of the House of Lords (1995–2024).
- Peter Schmidl, 84, Austrian clarinetist, principal clarinetist of the Vienna Philharmonic.
- Rolf Sennewald, 87, German Olympic weightlifter (1960).
- Christian Steiner, 64, German Olympic figure skater (1980).
- Dame Iritana Tāwhiwhirangi, 95, New Zealand educator.
- Ángel Torres, 72, Dominican baseball player (Cincinnati Reds).
- Wojciech Trzciński, 75, Polish composer and musician.
- Bob Turner, 88, Australian rules footballer (Melbourne).
- Johan Van den Driessche, 71, Belgian politician, member of the Parliament of the Brussels-Capital Region (2014–2019).
- Fay Vincent, 86, American lawyer and sports executive, commissioner of baseball (1989–1992), bladder cancer.
- Leon Wróbel, 70, Polish Olympic sailor (1980).

=== 2 ===
- Nasiruddin Ahamed, 70–71, Indian politician, West Bengal MLA (2011–2016, since 2021), cardiac arrest.
- Ogün Altıparmak, 86, Turkish footballer (Karşıyaka, Fenerbahçe, national team).
- Helga de Alvear, 88, German-Spanish art collector and dealer.
- Gene Barge, 98, American saxophonist, composer and actor.
- Gerlin Bean, 85, Jamaican community worker.
- Halla Beloff, 94, German-born British psychologist.
- Claude Boileau, 91, Canadian ice hockey player (New Haven Blades, Long Island Ducks).
- Friedrich Wilhelm Braun, 83, Brazilian basketball player, Olympic bronze medallist (1964).
- William J. Cabaniss, 86, American politician and diplomat, ambassador to the Czech Republic (2004–2006), member of the Alabama House of Representatives (1978–1982) and Senate (1982–1990).
- Newton Cardoso, 86, Brazilian politician, governor of Minas Gerais (1987–1991) and three-time deputy, multiple organ failure.
- John Crosse, 83, British disc jockey and television presenter. (death announced on this date)
- Julian Davies, 93, British biologist.
- Gavan Daws, 91–92, Australian-born American writer and historian.
- Ed DeClercq, 72, American politician, member of the New Hampshire House of Representatives (2018–2020).
- Sea Diallo, 66, Senegalese painter and artist.
- Mark Dyczkowski, 73, English Indologist.
- Luce Eekman, 91, French architect and actress.
- Peter Enders, 62, German chess player.
- Björgólfur Guðmundsson, 84, Icelandic businessman, CEO of Hafskip (1977–1986), chairman of Landsbanki (2003–2008) and West Ham (2007–2009).
- Barbie Hsu, 48, Taiwanese actress (Meteor Garden, Mars), singer, and television host (100% Entertainment), pneumonia.
- Johannes Hübner, 68, Austrian politician, member of the National Council (2008–2017) and the Federal Council (2020–2023).
- Job an Irien, 87, French writer and Roman Catholic priest.
- Duane Koslowski, 65, American Olympic wrestler (1988).
- Tom Kraeutler, 65, American radio host (The Money Pit Home Improvement Radio Show), complications from surgery.
- Mort Künstler, 97, American visual artist.
- Jean-Claude Lamy, 83, French journalist, writer, and publisher.
- Lee Joo-sil, 80, South Korean actress (The Uncanny Counter, Train to Busan, Squid Game), stomach cancer.
- Ian Maddieson, 82, British-American linguist and academic.
- Tony Martin, 80, English farmer and convicted criminal, stroke.
- Gabriel Melo Guevara, 85, Colombian judge and politician, associate justice of the supreme court (1972–1978), senator (1991–1994).
- Margaret Miles-Bramwell, 76, British businesswoman.
- P. H. Moriarty, 86, British actor (The Long Good Friday, Lock, Stock and Two Smoking Barrels, Jaws 3-D).
- Brian Murphy, 92, English actor (Man About the House, George and Mildred, Last of the Summer Wine), cancer.
- Katsuko Nishimoto, 74, Japanese politician, MP (2005–2009).
- Sam Nordquist, 24, American transgender man, murdered.
- André Pichot, 74, French historian of science.
- Billy Pirie, 75, Scottish footballer (Arbroath, Aberdeen, Dundee).
- Victoria Powers, 66, American mathematician, complications from amyotrophic lateral sclerosis.
- Anson Rabinbach, 79, American historian, co-founder and editor of New German Critique, fall.
- Jean-Pierre Razat, 84, French rugby union player (Agen, national team).
- Abílio Rodas de Sousa Ribas, 94, Portuguese Roman Catholic prelate, bishop of São Tomé and Príncipe (1984–2006).
- Thierry Rocher, 65, French playwright and actor.
- Alan Shoulder, 71, English football player (Newcastle United, Carlisle United, Hartlepool United) and manager.
- Harry Stewart Jr., 100, American Air Force pilot (Tuskegee Airmen).
- Jean-Claude Szurdak, 87, French-born American chef.
- Enrique Valdivieso, 81, Spanish art historian, smoke inhalation.
- Francis James West, 97, British-Australian historian.
- Marion Wiesel, 94, Austrian-American translator and Holocaust survivor.
- Gerd Wirth, 73, German politician, member of the Landtag of North Rhine-Westphalia (1990–2005).

=== 3 ===
- Kandiah Balendra, 85, Sri Lankan businessman, chairman of the Bank of Ceylon (2000–2002) and the Ceylon Tobacco Company (2003–2008).
- John Buchanan, 87, American Presbyterian minister.
- Michael Burawoy, 77, British sociologist and author (Manufacturing Consent), traffic collision.
- David Edward Byrd, 83, American graphic artist, complications from COVID-19.
- Roger Charles Carolin, 95, British-born Australian botanist.
- Enam Ahmed Chowdhury, 87, Bangladeshi civil servant, cardiac arrest.
- Rich Dauer, 72, American baseball player (Baltimore Orioles) and coach (Kansas City Royals, Colorado Rockies).
- Bettina Heltberg, 82, Danish journalist (Politiken) and actress (Det støver stadig).
- Mark Huntley, 68, American politician, member of the Vermont House of Representatives (2013–2017).
- Jag de Bellouet, 27, French racehorse.
- Harry Jayawardena, 82, Sri Lankan businessman, chairman of DCSL (since 1992).
- John Jonas, 92, Canadian engineer.
- Gunilla Knutsson, 84, Swedish actress, model and author.
- Lim Tze Peng, 103, Singaporean painter, pneumonia.
- Lima, 83, Brazilian footballer (Santos, Tampa Bay Rowdies, national team), kidney disease.
- Herbert Madejski, 79, Austrian politician, MP (2013).
- Josh Mail, 50, Australian footballer (Adelaide Crows), cancer.
- Victor Menezes, 77, Indian banker.
- Benzion Miller, 77, Polish-born American cantor.
- Chris Newman, 84, American sound engineer (The Exorcist, Amadeus, The English Patient), Oscar winner (1974, 1985, 1997).
- Jack Penrod, 85, American lifestyle and hospitality club owner, cancer.
- Jean-Loup Philippe, 90, French actor (Lèvres de sang, Le Sexe qui parle).
- Stéphane Picq, 59, French video game music composer (Dune, MegaRace, Lost Eden).
- Paul Plishka, 83, American operatic bass.
- Mashkoor Raza, 76–77, Pakistani painter.
- Aubrey Richmond, 67, Guyanese Olympic cyclist (1984, 1992).
- John Roberts, 80, English musician.
- Erwin Rüddel, 69, German politician, MP (since 2009) and member of the Landtag of Rhineland-Palatinate (1987, 1998–2009).
- Armen Sargsyan, 46, Ukrainian separatist, bomb blast.
- Jürgen Schmude, 88, German politician, minister of education (1978–1981), justice (1981–1982) and the interior (1982).
- Tahir Shah, 66, Pakistani cricketer (National Bank of Pakistan, Lahore A), cardiac arrest.
- John Shumate, 72, American basketball player (Phoenix Suns, Buffalo Braves) and coach (SMU Mustangs).
- Eurides Brito da Silva, 87, Brazilian teacher and politician, deputy (1991–1993).
- Amos Smith, 80, American chemist and academic.
- Jim Todd, 77, American baseball player (Oakland Athletics, Chicago Cubs, Seattle Mariners).
- Kaneo Yokoe, 91, Japanese politician, MP (1983–1986).
- Yoshio Yoshida, 91, Japanese baseball player (Osaka Tigers/Hanshin Tigers).

=== 4 ===
- Satoru Abe, 98, American sculptor and painter.
- Aga Khan IV, 88, Swiss-born British-Portuguese religious leader, imam of Nizari Ismaili (since 1957) and Olympic skier (1964).
- Assa Auerbach, 69, Israeli theoretical physicist.
- Thea Bock, 86, German politician, member of the Hamburg Parliament (1982–1984, 1986–1988) and MP (1991–1994).
- William Browder, 91, American mathematician.
- Jiří Čtvrtečka, 82, Czech Olympic sprint canoer (1968, 1972, 1976).
- Bill Down, 90, British cleric, bishop of Bermuda (1990–1996).
- Sid Ahmed Ghozali, 87, Algerian politician, prime minister (1991–1992).
- Byron Guthrie, 89, Australian footballer (Footscray).
- Hal Hirshorn, 60, American painter and photographer, coronary artery disease.
- Maria Teresa Horta, 87, Portuguese writer (New Portuguese Letters), journalist and activist.
- Ana María Iriarte, 98, Spanish mezzo-soprano.
- Sarhad Yawsip Jammo, 83, Iraqi-born American Chaldean Catholic prelate, bishop of Saint Peter the Apostle of San Diego (2002–2016).
- Joo Yang-ja, 94, South Korean physician and politician, MNA (1992–1996, 2000) and minister of health (1998).
- Claire Malroux, 99, French poet and translator.
- Paulo Martorano, 91, Brazilian footballer (national team).
- Alexander McGuire, 92, New Zealand cricketer.
- Wily Mignon, 38, Beninese singer and composer.
- Adam Miller, 77, American singer-songwriter.
- Felipe Montemayor, 96, Mexican baseball player (Pittsburgh Pirates).
- Ko Nakajima, 84, Japanese video artist and photographer.
- Bill Nations, 82, American politician, mayor of Norman, Oklahoma (1992–1998), member of the Oklahoma House of Representatives (1998–2010).
- Pushpalatha, 87, Indian actress (Sengottai Singam, Naanum Oru Penn, Aalayamani).
- Stewart Reuben, 85, British chess and poker player.
- Ed Seeman, 93, American animator and pornographic film director.
- Troy Selwood, 40, Australian footballer (Brisbane Lions), suicide.
- Karshan Solanki, 68, Indian politician, Gujarat MLA (since 2017), cancer.
- Humberto Souto, 90, Brazilian politician, three-time deputy, president of the Tribunal de Contas da União (2001–2002).
- Douw Steyn, 72, South African businessman, founder of BGL Group.
- Shelley Taub, 85, American politician, member of the Michigan House of Representatives (2003–2006).
- Gary Tucker, 79, American football player (Miami Dolphins).
- Donald L. Turcotte, 92, American geophysicist.
- Dave Van Gorder, 67, American baseball player (Cincinnati Reds, Baltimore Orioles).
- Georges Vianès, 86, French civil servant.
- Wang Renzhi, 91, Chinese politician, head of the Publicity Department (1987–1992).
- Solly Wolf, 75, British businessman.

=== 5 ===
- Will Cagle, 86, American racing driver, complications from a fall.
- Tinaye Chigudu, 82, Zimbabwean politician, cancer.
- J. Arthur Cooper, 92, American politician and academic, member of the Utah House of Representatives (1959–1961).
- Ján Cuper, 78, Slovak politician, MP (1992–2006).
- Vito Di Tano, 70, Italian cyclo-cross cyclist.
- Waldo Díaz-Balart, 93, Cuban artist.
- Antonín Fajkus, 101, Czechoslovak-born American fighter pilot.
- Thomas Gallen, 92, American politician and jurist, member of the Florida House of Representatives (1965–1972) and Senate (1972–1978).
- Phillip C. Goldstick, 94, American politician, member of the Illinois House of Representatives (1965–1967).
- Irv Gotti, 54, American record producer ("Foolish", "Always on Time") and executive (Murder Inc. Records), complications from multiple strokes.
- Torkel Gregow, 89, Swedish lawyer.
- Bob Hager, 63, American politician, member of the Iowa House of Representatives (2011–2013).
- Helen Hays, 93, American ornithologist, complications from dementia.
- Adam Hunter, 43, Australian footballer (West Coast Eagles), heart failure.
- Dave Jerden, 75, American record producer (Ritual de lo Habitual, Americana) and recording engineer (Remain in Light), stroke.
- Ernie Kellermann, 81, American football player (Cleveland Browns, Cincinnati Bengals, Buffalo Bills).
- Armen Kirakossian, 64, Armenian politician, MP (1995–1999).
- Ernst-Joachim Küppers, 82, German swimmer, Olympic silver medallist (1964).
- Hans-Peter Lehmann, 90, German opera director, Staatsoper Hannover (1980–2001).
- Alfredo Letanú, 72, Argentine footballer (Boca Juniors, Unión Española, Cartagena).
- Xiaoyu Luo, 64, Chinese-British applied mathematician.
- Louis-Gaston Mayila, 78, Gabonese politician and businessman, complications from a stroke.
- R. I. Moore, 83, British historian and academic.
- Steven Lawayne Nelson, 37, American convicted murderer, execution by lethal injection.
- Roger A. Pedersen, 80, American-British stem cell biologist, metastatic non-small cell lung cancer.
- Mike Ratledge, 81, British musician (Soft Machine).
- James Reason, 86, English psychology professor (Swiss cheese model).
- Andrés Reggiardo, 83, Peruvian politician, member of the Democratic Constituent Congress (1992–1995), Congress of the Republic of Peru (1995–2001).
- Dennis Richmond, 81, American news anchor (KTVU).
- Aldo Tortorella, 98, Italian journalist and politician, deputy (1972–1994).
- Brian Turner, 80, New Zealand poet and field hockey player (national team), New Zealand Poet Laureate (2003–2005), heart attack.
- Howard Twilley, 81, American football player (Tulsa Golden Hurricane, Miami Dolphins), Super Bowl champion (1973,1974).
- Elisabeth Vrba, 82, German-born American paleontologist (turnover-pulse hypothesis), complications from a fall.
- Maksym Yemets, 30, Ukrainian poet and soldier. (death announced on this date)

=== 6 ===
- Emil Altobello, 75, American politician, member of the Connecticut House of Representatives (1995–2021).
- Farida Anwar, 82, British politician.
- Justice Azuka, Nigerian politician, member of the Anambra State House of Assembly. (body discovered on this date)
- Ross Boggs, 86, American politician, member of the Ohio House of Representatives (1983–1989).
- Jacques Chaumont, 90, French politician, deputy (1968–1977), senator (1977–2004).
- Peter Christensen, 49, Danish politician, MP (2001–2015), minister of defence (2015–2016), cancer.
- Marie-José Crespin, 88, Senegalese magistrate, judge of the Court of Cassation (1992–2001).
- Paddy Cullen, 80, Irish Gaelic footballer (Dublin) and manager.
- Peter Elbow, 89, American academic and English language scholar, perforated intestine.
- Demetrius Terrence Frazier, 52, American convicted murderer and serial rapist, execution by nitrogen hypoxia.
- Alphonse A. Haettenschwiller, 99, American military officer and politician, member of the New Hampshire House of Representatives (1990–2000).
- Ed Hinton, 76, American motorsports writer (ESPN.com).
- Huang Xuhua, 98, Chinese nuclear engineer (Type 091, Type 092), member of the Chinese Academy of Engineering.
- Columbus Irosanga, Nigerian actor (Issakaba).
- Peter Judd, 86, English cricketer (Surrey).
- Kenneth Kitchen, 92, British biblical scholar and historian.
- Zeynep Korkmaz, 103, Turkish linguist and dialectologist.
- Juliusz Kulesza, 96, Polish graphic designer. (death announced on this date)
- Andrzej Marchel, 60, Polish footballer (Lechia Gdańsk, Olimpia Poznań).
- Gordon Marshall, 85, English-Scottish footballer (Heart of Midlothian, Newcastle United, Arbroath).
- Virginia Halas McCaskey, 102, American football executive and owner (Chicago Bears).
- Nigel McCrery, 71, English television writer (Silent Witness, New Tricks).
- Richard Meredith, 92, American ice hockey player, Olympic champion (1960).
- Paul Morris, 86, Canadian public address announcer (Toronto Maple Leafs).
- Owusu-Ankomah, 68, Ghanaian artist.
- Ilya Rosenblum, 86, Russian politician, senator (2000–2001).
- Paul-Louis Rossi, 91, French arts critic and poet.
- María Lourdes Ruiz, 59, Nicaraguan athlete.
- Helen Schreider, 98, American explorer.
- Donald Shoup, 86, American electrical engineer and urban theorist (The High Cost of Free Parking).
- Józef Stala, 58, Polish Roman Catholic priest, theologian and philosopher.
- Paul-Loup Sulitzer, 78, French author and financier, stroke.
- Vladimir Titov, 60, Russian diplomat, ambassador to Bulgaria (1999–2004).
- Ernie Walley, 91, Welsh football player (Middlesbrough, Tottenham Hotspur) and manager (Barking).
- Dwarkanath Sanzgiri, 74, Indian writer and journalist.

=== 7 ===
- Viktor Antonov, 52, Bulgarian art director (Redneck Rampage, Half-Life 2, Dishonored).
- Akbar Behkalam, 80, Iranian-born German painter and sculptor.
- Denise Brice, 96, French paleontologist.
- Jean-Charles Canetti, 79, Italian-born French footballer (Nîmes, Arlésien, Olympique Alès).
- Kameshwar Choupal, 68, Indian politician, Bihar MLC (2002–2014).
- Giuseppe Colantuono, 96, Italian Olympic weightlifter (1948).
- Michael Coleman, 61, Irish hurler (Abbeyknockmoy, Galway).
- Lawrence Cunliffe, 95, British politician, MP (1979–2001).
- Dickson Despommier, 84, American microbiologist and ecologist.
- Anthony Dileo Jr., 68, American actor (Day of the Dead, Passed Away, Lorenzo's Oil), complications from COVID-19.
- Dafydd Elis-Thomas, Baron Elis-Thomas, 78, Welsh politician, llywydd of the Senedd (1999–2011), MP (1974–1992) and member of the House of Lords (since 1992).
- Bruce French, 79, American actor (Passions, The Riches, Fletch), complications from Alzheimer's disease.
- Martti Häikiö, 75, Finnish historian.
- Ahmad Harb, 73, Palestinian writer.
- Erna Herbers, 99, German Olympic swimmer.
- Toomas Leius, 83, Estonian tennis player and convicted murderer.
- Joshua Love, 34, New Zealand hospitality entrepreneur and political candidate, traffic collision.
- Love Divine, 27, British Thoroughbred racehorse.
- Alain Maline, 77, French film director, producer, and screenwriter.
- Robert Maus, 91, German politician, member of the Landtag of Baden-Württemberg (1972–1996).
- Leonard Mbotela, 84, Kenyan journalist.
- Chris Moore, 77, British science fiction illustrator.
- Naâman, 34, French reggae singer, brain tumour.
- Naing Myanmar, 68, Burmese singer, heart attack.
- Warren Pitt, 76, Australian politician, Queensland MP (1989–1995, 1998–2009).
- Yeshe Lodoi Rinpoche, 81–82, Tibetan-born Russian lama and singer.
- Tony Roberts, 85, American actor (Annie Hall, Play It Again, Sam, Serpico), lung cancer.
- Darwin Zahedy Saleh, 64, Indonesian economist and banker, minister of energy and mineral resources (2009–2011).
- Burke Scott, 92, American basketball player and coach (Indiana Hoosiers).
- Song Dae-kwan, 78, South Korean singer, heart attack.
- Robert W. Tucker, 100, American writer.
- H. S. Versnel, 88, Dutch historian.
- Mick Walker, 84, English football player and manager (Notts County).

=== 8 ===
- Martin Aurell, 66, Spanish-born French historian and academic, pulmonary embolism.
- Karl Banse, 95, German-born American oceanographer.
- Bob Bingham, 78, American actor (Jesus Christ Superstar).
- Baldemar Carrasco, 93, Chilean politician, deputy (1969–1973, 1990–1994).
- Issam Al-Chalabi, 82, Iraqi politician, minister of oil (1987–1990).
- John Cooney, 28, Irish boxer, intracranial haemorrhage.
- Corey Crewe, 80, Canadian musician (Corey and Trina).
- Mikhail Davydov, 77, Russian oncologist, president of the Russian Academy of Medical Sciences (2006–2011).
- Boubacar Biro Diallo, 103, Guinean politician, president of the National Assembly (1995–2002).
- Gennady Dobrokhotov, 76, Russian Olympic boxer (1972).
- Matt Doyle, 70, American-born Irish tennis player.
- Mary Foulkes, 75, American biostatistician.
- Dick Jauron, 74, American football player (Detroit Lions, Cincinnati Bengals) and coach (Chicago Bears), cancer.
- Christopher Jencks, 88, American sociologist, complications from Alzheimer's disease.
- Jim Karsatos, 61, American football player (Ohio State Buckeyes, Miami Dolphins).
- Yrjö Kukkapuro, 91, Finnish interior designer.
- Sam Nujoma, 95, Namibian politician, president (1990–2005).
- Jerome Plante, 90, American politician, member of the Maine House of Representatives (1957–1965).
- Jadwiga Puzynina, 97, Polish linguist.
- Howard Riley, 81, English pianist and composer.
- Alex Sadkowsky, 91, Swiss artist.
- Vic Simms, 79, Australian singer-songwriter.
- Gyalo Thondup, 96, Tibetan political activist.
- Komkrit Uitekkeng, 43, Thai religion academic, heart attack.
- Deusdete Vasconcelos, 78, Brazilian Olympic boxer (1972).
- Roland Winston, 88, American scientist.

=== 9 ===
- Mohammad Abdur Rouf, 91, Bangladeshi jurist and civil servant, chief election commissioner (1990–1995) and judge of the Supreme Court (1982–1990, 1995–1999).
- William H. Bassett, 89, American actor (The Karate Kid, Days of Our Lives, Fallout 3).
- Santos Bedoya, 85, Spanish footballer (Espanyol, Deportivo La Coruña, Sevilla).
- Lucy J. Brown, 91, American social justice activist and public servant.
- Beverly Byron, 92, American politician, member of the U.S. House of Representatives (1979–1993).
- George Camp, 98, American politician, member of the Oklahoma House of Representatives (1965–1983).
- Michael Carpenter, 88, English-born Canadian tennis player.
- Benny Chastain, 82, American racing driver (ARCA Menards Series).
- Giles Cokelet, 93, American chemical engineer.
- Mara Corday, 95, American actress (Tarantula, Dawn at Socorro, Foxfire) and model (Playboy), arteriosclerotic cardiovascular disease.
- George Davies, 97, English footballer (Sheffield Wednesday, Chester City, Oswestry Town).
- Amal Nasser el-Din, 96, Israeli author and politician, MK (1977–1988).
- Miika Elomo, 47, Finnish ice hockey player (Washington Capitals).
- Wally Gabler, 80, American gridiron football player (Toronto Argonauts, Hamilton Tiger-Cats, Winnipeg Blue Bombers), brain and prostate cancer.
- Elena Grölz, 64, Romanian-German handball player (TV Lützellinden, Germany national team, 1992 Olympics).
- Joan Delaney Grossman, 96, American academic.
- Peter Haggett, 92, British geographer.
- George Johnston, 77, Scottish footballer (Cardiff City, Fulham, Arsenal).
- Thomas E. Kauper, 89, American lawyer and legal scholar.
- Edith Mathis, 86, Swiss operatic soprano (Deutsche Oper Berlin) and voice teacher.
- Mike McGinness, 77, American politician, member of the Nevada Assembly (1988–1992) and Senate (1992–2012).
- Ginette Moulin, 98, French businesswoman, chairwoman of Galeries Lafayette (since 2004).
- Asil Nadir, 83, Cypriot textiles executive and convicted fraudster, CEO of Polly Peck (1980–1990).
- Janice Parker, 87, Australian cricketer (national team).
- Giorgio Pellizzaro, 77, Italian footballer (Mantova, Catanzaro, Brescia).
- Athos Pisoni, 87, Brazilian Olympic sports shooter (1976), cancer.
- Tom Robbins, 92, American novelist (Even Cowgirls Get the Blues, Jitterbug Perfume, Still Life with Woodpecker).
- Walter Robinson, 74, American painter and art writer, cancer.
- Sergey Rogov, 76, Russian political scientist, director of the Institute for US and Canadian Studies (1995–2015).
- Michael Rothwell, 71, American sailor, Olympic silver medalist (1976).
- David E. Sellers, 86, American architect.
- Ryszard Stanibuła, 74, Polish politician, MP (1993–1997, 1998–2005).
- Oleg Strizhenov, 95, Russian actor (The Mexican, The Captain's Daughter, The Star of Captivating Happiness).
- Sir Colin Terry, 81, British air marshal.
- John Tudor, 78, English footballer (Newcastle United, Sheffield United, Coventry City), complications from dementia.
- Grazia Zuffa, 79, Italian politician, senator (1987–1994).

=== 10 ===
- Jorge Aguirre, 63, Argentine Olympic judoka.
- Mustafa Arruf, 66, Spanish sculptor.
- John Cernuto, 81, American poker player, colon cancer.
- Jerome Drayton, 80, Canadian Olympic long-distance runner (1968, 1976), complications from knee surgery.
- Wojciech Dziembowski, 84, Polish astronomer, member of the Polish Academy of Sciences.
- David Gillette, 78, American paleontologist.
- Grégoire Girard, 99, Canadian surveyor and politician, mayor of Saint-Hyacinthe (1971–1976).
- Paul Hargrave, 86, American biochemist, pancreatic cancer.
- Robert Haselkorn, 90, American molecular biologist and microbiologist.
- Jeanette W. Hyde, 86, American diplomat, ambassador to Barbados, Dominica, and Saint Lucia (1994–1998).
- Takis Ikonomopoulos, 81, Greek footballer (Panathinaikos, Apollon Smyrnis, national team), stroke.
- Bob Kierlin, 85, American businessman (Fastenal) and politician, member of the Minnesota Senate (1999–2007).
- Tony Kinsey, 97, English jazz drummer.
- William R. Lucas, 102, American spaceflight administrator, director of the Marshall Space Flight Center (1974–1986).
- Senamile Masango, 37, South African nuclear scientist. (death announced on this date)
- Otto Mayr, 94, German mechanical engineer and technology historian.
- Oscar Medelius, 69, Peruvian politician, member of Congress (1995–2000) and president of Sport Boys (1995), shot.
- Donn Moomaw, 93, American Hall of Fame football player (UCLA Bruins) and Presbyterian minister.
- Fabio de Jesús Morales Grisales, 90, Colombian Roman Catholic prelate, bishop of Mocoa–Sibundoy (1991–2003).
- Ted S. Nelson, 89, Guamanian politician, member of the Legislature (1983–1991, 1993–1997).
- Chet Noe, 93, American basketball player (Buchan Bakers, Houston Ada Oilers, Phillips 66ers).
- Tim Radford, 84, New Zealand-born British journalist (The Guardian, The New Zealand Herald).
- Aruna Rankothge, 52, Sri Lankan rugby union player (Kandy SC), referee and coach.
- Gurdev Singh, 77, Indian sarod player.
- Mary Ellen W. Smoot, 91, American religious leader.
- David Socha, 86, American soccer referee.
- Antônio Fagundes de Souza, 90, Brazilian politician, Minas Gerais MLA (1987–1988).
- Terror Danjah, 45, British record producer and musician.
- Maria Tipo, 93, Italian pianist.
- Peter Tuiasosopo, 61, American football player (Los Angeles Rams) and actor (Street Fighter, Necessary Roughness).
- Jean-Claude Walter, 84, French poet.
- Horst Weidenmüller, 60, German music executive, founder of !K7 Music.
- Hal Wissel, 86, American college basketball coach (TCNJ Lions, Florida Southern Moccasins, Charlotte 49ers).

=== 11 ===
- Tony Bedeau, 45, British-born Grenadian footballer (Torquay United).
- Peter B. Bensinger, 88, American civil servant, administrator of the Drug Enforcement Administration (1976–1981).
- Joop Berkhout, 94, Dutch-Nigerian book publisher.
- Raosaheb Rangnath Borade, 84, Indian novelist (Pachola).
- Philip Brady, 85, Australian radio broadcaster (3AW) and television host (Concentration, In Melbourne Tonight), cancer.
- John Bray, 87, New Zealand cricketer (Wellington).
- Yvonne Choquet-Bruhat, 101, French mathematician and physicist.
- Félix Cumbé, 60, Dominican singer and songwriter, complications during heart surgery.
- Danny DiLiberto, 89, American pool player.
- Jan Drenth, 99, Dutch chemist.
- Howard Dully, 76, American memoirist.
- Jerry Eisenberg, 87, American animator (Tom & Jerry Kids, Secret Squirrel, The Flintstones).
- Uri Eppstein, 100, German musicologist.
- Knut Flatin, 79, Norwegian painter and printmaker.
- Margarita Forés, 65, Filipino chef and restaurateur, cardiac arrest.
- Bernard Lagacé, 94, Canadian organist and musicologist.
- Danielle Legros Georges, 60, Haitian-American poet.
- Moses Lim, 75, Singaporean actor (Under One Roof).
- Richard Malaby, 73, American politician, member of the Maine House of Representatives (2010–2018).
- Sigrid Metz-Göckel, 84, German sociologist and political scientist.
- Norma Mora, 81, Mexican actress (Qué perra vida, Los astronautas).
- Robert Obrist, 66, Swiss politician, member of the Grand Council of Aargau (2014–2024).
- Leonardo Patterson, 82, Costa Rican-born American antiques dealer.
- Graham Richards, 85, English chemist.
- Georgios Roubanis, 95, Greek pole vaulter, Olympic bronze medallist (1956).
- Paul Round, 65, English footballer (Blackburn Rovers).
- Joe Saumarez Smith, 53, British horseracing administrator, chairman of the British Horseracing Authority (2022–2025), lung cancer.
- Anneke Scholtens, 69, Dutch author.
- Sampat Shivangi, 88, Indian-born American physician.
- Kay Smith, 101, American visual artist.
- John Tewell, 80, American pilot and aerial photographer.
- Olga Titkova, 83, Russian actress.
- Uladzimir Vostrykaw, 48, Belarusian football player (Dinamo Minsk, Chernomorets Novorossiysk, Torpedo-SKA Minsk) and manager.
- Paul Wilderdyke, 82, American politician, member of the Iowa House of Representatives (2001–2007).

=== 12 ===
- Ana Ambrazienė, 69, Lithuanian hurdler.
- Zacarias Andias, 93, Portuguese Olympic rower (1952).
- Betsy Arakawa, 65, American pianist, hantavirus pulmonary syndrome.
- Niké Arrighi, 80, French actress (The Devil Rides Out, Day for Night, Women in Love).
- Lynn August, 76, American zydeco accordionist, keyboard player and singer.
- Patrick Barclay, 77, British sportswriter (The Times, The Sunday Telegraph) and television personality (Sunday Supplement).
- Maurice Bernart, 92, French film producer (This Sweet Sickness, Les Marins perdus) and actor (Ne quittez pas !).
- Gisela Bleibtreu-Ehrenberg, 95, German sociologist, ethnologist and sexologist (Tabu Homosexualität).
- Mel Bochner, 84, American conceptual artist.
- Michael Brotherton, 89, English Anglican priest, archdeacon of Chichester (1991–2002).
- Rika Bruins, 90, Dutch Olympic swimmer (1952).
- Richard Dindo, 80, Swiss documentary film director (Grüningers Fall).
- James Ferguson, 65, American anthropologist and author (The Anti-Politics Machine).
- Tom Fitzmorris, 74, American food critic, complications from Alzheimer's disease.
- Ali Gagarin, 75, Sudanese footballer (Al Hilal, Al Nassr, national team).
- Cordell Green, 83, American computer scientist.
- Barthold Halle, 99, Norwegian stage instructor, film director and theatre director.
- Dave Heaton, 84, American politician, member of the Iowa House of Representatives (1995–2019).
- Tommy Hunt, 91, American Hall of Fame soul singer (The Flamingos).
- Prabhakar Karekar, 80, Indian Hindustani classical singer.
- Li Xiaojiang, 73, Chinese women's studies scholar.
- Simon Mawer, 76, British author (The Glass Room, Trapeze).
- Jimi Mbaye, 67, Senegalese guitarist.
- Miyeko Murase, 100, Japanese art historian and curator.
- Beverly Nelson, 95, American politician.
- Nguyễn Văn Thuyết, 69, Vietnamese Olympic runner (1988).
- Karl E. Peters, 85, American religious scholar.
- Holmes Rolston III, 92, American philosopher.
- Azmat Saeed, 70, Pakistani jurist, justice of the supreme court (2012–2019) and chief justice of the Lahore High Court (2010–2012).
- Al Valdes, 89, Canadian football player (Calgary Stampeders).
- Giuseppe Verucchi, 87, Italian Roman Catholic prelate, archbishop of Ravenna-Cervia (2000–2012).
- Denis Wick, 93, British trombonist.
- Biff Wiff, 76, American actor (I Think You Should Leave, Everything Everywhere All at Once, Brooklyn Nine-Nine), cancer.

=== 13 ===
- William Beattie, 82, Northern Irish politician, MLA (1973–1974, 1982–1986).
- Misha Berson, 74, American theatre critic and journalist.
- Tukaram Bidkar, Indian politician and actor, Maharashtra MLA (2004–2009), traffic collision.
- Rod Bockenfeld, 69, American politician, member of the Colorado House of Representatives (2019–2025).
- Sukri Bommagowda, 88, Indian folk singer.
- Ronnie Boyce, 82, English footballer (West Ham United).
- Rod Burstall, 90, British computer scientist, co-founder of the Laboratory for Foundations of Computer Science.
- Michael Cart, 83, American author and literary theorist.
- Edgerton Roland Clarke, 95, Jamaican Roman Catholic prelate, bishop of Montego Bay (1967–1994) and archbishop of Kingston in Jamaica (1994–2004).
- János Dunai, 87, Hungarian football player (Pécsi Dózsa, national team) and manager (Pécsi Vasutas).
- Nancy Flanagan, 95, British community worker and activist.
- Angel Gagliano, 74, Argentine Olympic triple jumper.
- June Goodfield, 97, British writer and historian.
- Fethi Heper, 81, Turkish footballer (Eskişehirspor, national team).
- Alan Hobbs, 80, English cricketer (Cambridgeshire).
- Delcat Idengo, 31, Congolese singer-songwriter and rapper, shot.
- Fulke Johnson Houghton, 84, British Thoroughbred racehorse trainer.
- André Lamy, 92, French Olympic wrestler (1960).
- Rex Lassalle, 79, Trinidadian alternative medicine practitioner and army leader (Black Power Revolution).
- John Lawlor, 83, American actor (Phyllis, The Facts of Life, Wyatt Earp).
- John Long, 89, British computer scientist.
- Mimmo Lucà, 71, Italian politician, deputy (1994–2013).
- Jacqueline van Maarsen, 96, Dutch author and bookbinder.
- Harald Malmgren, 89, American author and economist.
- Leo Monahan, 92, American artist.
- Paul Pataer, 86, Belgian politician, senator (1985–1991, 1992–1995).
- Roger Pohon, 85, French footballer (Nantes, France Amateurs) and manager (Quimper).
- Kazimierz Rafalik, 86, Polish sculptor.
- Bernard Saladin d'Anglure, 88, Canadian anthropologist and ethnographer.
- Noel Solomon, 53, Australian rugby footballer (North Sydney Bears).
- Richard Lee Tabler, 46, American spree killer, execution by lethal injection.
- Geraldine Thompson, 76, American politician, member of the Florida Senate (2012–2016, since 2022) and House of Representatives (2006–2012, 2018–2022), complications from knee surgery.
- Jim Guy Tucker, 81, American politician, member of the U.S. House of Representatives (1977–1979), Arkansas lieutenant governor (1991–1992) and governor (1992–1996), complications from ulcerative colitis.

=== 14 ===
- Ayo Adebanjo, 96, Nigerian lawyer and nationalist, co-founder of Afenifere.
- Gustave Alirol, 76, French politician, member of the Regional Council of Auvergne (2010–2015), mayor of Saint-Hostien (1983–2008).
- Avi Assouly, 74, French-Israeli journalist and politician, deputy (2012–2014).
- Salih Saeed Ba-Amer, 78–79, Yemeni writer. (death announced on this date)
- Dave Burt, 88, Australian footballer (Collingwood).
- Chung Kum Weng, 90, Malaysian Olympic weightlifter (1960, 1964). (death announced on this date)
- Harry Coonce, 86, American mathematician (Mathematics Genealogy Project).
- Joseph Crisco Jr., 90, American politician, member of the Connecticut State Senate (1993–2017).
- Bill Demory, 74, American football player (New York Jets), complications from prostate cancer and Parkinson's disease.
- Carlos Diegues, 84, Brazilian film director (Ganga Zumba, Bye Bye Brazil, God Is Brazilian), complications from surgery.
- Walter Goffart, 90, American historian.
- William Hall Jr., 78, American actor (Driving Miss Daisy, Safety Not Guaranteed, Farewell to Harry).
- Alice Hirson, 95, American actress (Another World, Being There, One Life to Live).
- Kevyn Major Howard, 69, Canadian actor (Full Metal Jacket, Sudden Impact, Alien Nation).
- Sara Luzita, 102, British ballet dancer.
- Matutina, 78, Filipino actress (John en Marsha).
- Ken Meahl, 93, American Hall of Fame racing driver.
- Denzil Meyrick, 59, Scottish novelist.
- Geneviève Page, 97, French actress (Belle de Jour, Grand Prix, The Private Life of Sherlock Holmes).
- François Pantillon, 97, Swiss conductor, composer, and violinist.
- Hélène Pelletier-Baillargeon, 92, Canadian writer, journalist, and essayist.
- Francesco Rivella, 97, Italian chemist and businessman, inventor of Nutella.
- Irma Rochlin, 100, American politician, member of the Florida House of Representatives (1984–1988).
- Barbara Rybałtowska, 88, Polish writer and singer.
- Frank S. Turner, 77, American politician, member of the Maryland House of Delegates (1995–2019).
- Volponi, 27, American Thoroughbred racehorse.

=== 15 ===
- Ira Anders, 82, American politician, member of the Missouri House of Representatives (2011–2019).
- George Armitage, 82, American film director (Miami Blues, Grosse Pointe Blank, The Big Bounce).
- Renato Ballardini, 97, Italian politician, deputy (1958–1979).
- Gerhart Baum, 92, German lawyer and politician, federal minister of the interior (1978–1982), MP (1972–1994).
- Lamberto Ceserani, 71, Italian Olympic ice dancer (1976).
- Michał Czajkowski, 90, Polish Roman Catholic priest.
- L. Clifford Davis, 100, American civil rights pioneer and attorney.
- Chantal De Spiegeleer, 67, Belgian comic book author and artist (Adler, The Curse of the Thirty Denarii).
- Jaap van der Doef, 90, Dutch politician, MP (1973–1981, 1982–1986).
- Carol Doherty, 82, American politician, member of the Massachusetts House of Representatives (since 2020), pancreatic cancer.
- Stanley Duncan, 97, British diplomat, ambassador to Bolivia (1991–1995) and high commissioner to Malta (1995–1997.)
- M. Paul Friedberg, 93, American landscape architect, complications from COVID-19.
- Kathleen Goodwin, 84, American politician, member of the Maine House of Representatives (1969–1978).
- Vinod Kumar Gupta, 77, Indian jurist, chief justice of Jharkhand High Court (2000–2003), Himachal Pradesh High Court (2003–2008), and Uttarakhand High Court (2008–2009).
- Gran Hamada, 74, Japanese professional wrestler (UWA, WWF).
- Rosemarie Hein, 72, German politician, MP (2009–2017), member of the Landtag of Saxony-Anhalt (1990–2006).
- Muhsin Hendricks, 57, South African imam and LGBT activist, shot.
- Elsie Johansson, 93, Swedish writer.
- Włodzimierz Kiernożycki, 73, Polish engineer and academic.
- William Kipkorir, 57, Kenyan politician, senator (since 2022).
- Serge Lasvignes, 70, French government official, president of the Centre Pompidou (2015–2021).
- Anita Lidya Luhulima, 57, Indonesian diplomat.
- Lavoo Mamledar, 68, Indian politician, Goa MLA (2012–2017), assault.
- Pratul Mukhopadhyay, 82, Indian singer and songwriter.
- David Parsons, 80, New Zealand composer.
- Jorge Nuno Pinto da Costa, 87, Portuguese sports administrator, president of Porto (1982–2024) and Liga Portuguesa de Futebol Profissional (1995–1996), cancer.
- Zus Ratulangi, 102, Indonesian-Dutch psychiatrist, pediatrician, politician, and independence activist, member of the Central Indonesian National Committee.
- Marshall Rose, 88, American real estate developer and philanthropist, complications from Parkinson's disease.
- Jim Schmedding, 79, American football player (San Diego Chargers).
- Uri Shulevitz, 89, American children's book writer (How I Learned Geography) and illustrator (The Fool of the World and the Flying Ship, The Fools of Chelm and Their History).
- Cecilia Stegö Chilò, 65, Swedish politician, minister for culture (2006).
- John Svahlstedt, 77, Swedish serial rapist.
- Louis Theobald, 86, Maltese footballer (Hibernians, Birżebbuġa St. Peter's, national team).
- Barry Urban, 56, Australian politician, Western Australian MLA (2017–2018).
- R. M. Vasagam, 81–82, Indian space scientist.
- Eddie Wade, 76, Irish politician, TD (1997–2002).
- Brian Walker, 68, American toy inventor.
- Alan Zaleski, 82, American politician, member of the Ohio Senate (1983–1998).

=== 16 ===
- Walter Althammer, 96, German politician.
- Joseph Boskin, 95, American historian.
- Ahmed Boukhari, 86, Moroccan secret service agent (DST).
- William Hodson Brock, 88, British chemist and science historian.
- Peter Close, 81, English cricketer (Cambridge University, Dorset).
- Mike Collier, 71, American football player (Pittsburgh Steelers, Buffalo Bills), Super Bowl champion (1976).
- Martine David, 72, French politician, deputy (1988–2007), mayor of Saint-Priest (2003–2014).
- Luis Estaba, 86, Venezuelan boxer, WBC light flyweight champion (1975–1978).
- Géraldine Faladé, 90, French writer and journalist.
- Jean-Denis Gendron, 100, Canadian linguist and academic.
- Gil Won-ok, 96, South Korean human rights activist, subject of The Apology.
- Anne Marie Hochhalter, 43, American school shooting survivor (Columbine High School massacre) and disability rights activist, sepsis complicated by gunshot wounds.
- Steve Hodson, 77, British actor (Follyfoot).
- Julian Holloway, 80, British actor (Carry On, James Bond Jr., Young Winston), lung infection.
- Evan Hultman, 99, American politician, attorney general of Iowa (1961–1965).
- Avetik Ishkhanian, 69, Armenian human rights activist.
- Jane Joseph, 82, English artist.
- Kim Sae-ron, 24, South Korean actress (A Brand New Life, The Man from Nowhere, A Girl at My Door), suicide.
- Krishnaveni, 100, Indian actress (Bhakta Prahlada, Brahma Ratham, Mana Desam), singer, and film producer.
- Yolanda Montes, 93, American-Mexican actress (Salomé, Kill Me Because I'm Dying!, Nocturne of Love) and dancer, complications from Alzheimer's disease.
- Michael O'Sullivan, 24, Irish jockey, complications from a race fall.
- Andrzej Potocki, 60, Polish politician, MP (1991–2001).
- Robert Richter, 95, American documentarian (Gods of Metal, School of the Americas Assassins) and film producer, heart failure.
- Esther Ronay, 84, Hungarian-British documentary filmmaker.
- Marika Sherwood, 87, American historian.
- Jim Silke, 93, American graphic designer, screenwriter (Sahara, King Solomon's Mines) and comic book artist (Rascals in Paradise).
- Óscar Valdez, 78, Argentine-born Spanish football player (Valencia, Spain national team) and manager (Paraguay national team), complications from Alzheimer's disease.
- Vladimír Válek, 89, Czech conductor (Prague Symphony Orchestra, Prague Radio Symphony Orchestra, Slovak Philharmonic).
- Zou Jiahua, 98, Chinese politician, vice premier (1991–1998) and member of the Politburo (1992–1997).

=== 17 ===
- Andreas Acrivos, 96, Greek-American physicist.
- Charlie Baillie, 90, Canadian football player (Montreal Alouettes, Calgary Stampeders).
- Frits Bolkestein, 91, Dutch politician, three-time MP, minister of defence (1988–1989), and European commissioner (1999–2004).
- Maríano Bucio, 82, Mexican Olympic equestrian (1972, 1976).
- Rick Buckler, 69, English rock drummer (The Jam, Time UK, From the Jam).
- Chow Ching Lie, 88, Chinese-French pianist and writer.
- Edwin Clark, 97, Nigerian civil servant.
- Krystyna Daszkiewicz, 100, Polish criminologist and psychologist.
- Eddie Fisher, 88, American baseball player (Chicago White Sox, California Angels, San Francisco Giants).
- Ian Hansen, 66, Falkland Islands politician, MLA (2003–2009, 2011–2023).
- James Harrison, 88, Australian blood donor.
- I. Martin Isaacs, 84, American group theorist.
- Ilyas Ismayilov, 86, Azerbaijani politician, minister of justice (1992–1995), MP (2006–2015).
- Itch Jones, 87, American baseball coach (Illinois Fighting Illini).
- Ana Lía Kornblit, 83, Argentine sociologist.
- Trevor Lake, 85–86, Rhodesian rugby league player (Wigan, St. George, national team). (death announced on this date)
- Peter Line, 94, English lawn bowler, world outdoor champion (1972).
- Geraldene Lowe-Ismail, 86–87, Singaporean tour guide and writer.
- Antonine Maillet, 95, Canadian novelist, playwright, and scholar.
- Petr Matoušek, 75, Czech Olympic cyclist (1972, 1976).
- Senzo Mfayela, 63, South African politician, MNA (1994–1999).
- Jamie Muir, 82, Scottish musician (King Crimson) and painter.
- K. K. S. Murthy, 88, Indian aeronautics engineer and bookseller.
- Amos Ojo, 62, Nigerian Olympic wrestler (1988, 1992).
- Paquita la del Barrio, 77, Mexican singer, songwriter and actress.
- Volker Roth, 83, German football referee.
- Gerd Stern, 96, American poet.
- Gary Stevens, 84, American radio personality.
- Hilt Tatum, 90, American dentist.
- Gogi Topadze, 84, Georgian politician, MP (1999–2008).
- Dan Wallace, 82, Irish politician, TD (1982–2007).
- Barry Zimmerman, 82, American educational psychologist.

=== 18 ===
- Salvatore Aquino, 80, Italian organised criminal.
- Jacques Augendre, 99, French journalist.
- Howard Burns, 86, British architectural historian.
- Corinne Cantrill, 96, Australian filmmaker.
- Josh Christy, 43, American politician, member of the North Dakota House of Representatives (since 2022).
- Alfred V. Covello, 92, American jurist, judge (since 1992) and chief judge (1998–2003) of the U.S. District Court for Connecticut.
- Marie-Chantal Depetris-Demaille, 83, French Olympic foil fencer (1964, 1968, 1972).
- James Donovan, 80, Irish forensic scientist.
- Adil Güngör, 94, Turkish Olympic wrestler.
- Gene Hackman, 95, American actor (The French Connection, Mississippi Burning, Unforgiven), Oscar winner (1972, 1993), heart disease and Alzheimer's disease.
- Christian Holder, 75, Trinidadian-British actor, dancer and choreographer.
- Hurricane, 15, American Secret Service dog.
- Allan Jacobs, 96, American urban designer.
- Sisira Jayasuriya, 78, Sri Lankan-born Australian economist, cancer.
- Keith R. Jennings, 92, British chemist.
- Jim Koetter, 87, American college football coach (Idaho State Bengals).
- James Martin, 93, Scottish actor (Still Game).
- Vito Molinari, 95, Italian television director.
- Gerald Ridsdale, 90, Australian Roman Catholic priest and convicted sex offender.
- Claus Roxin, 93, German jurist.
- John Sallis, 86, American philosopher.
- Scott Sauerbeck, 53, American baseball player (Pittsburgh Pirates, Boston Red Sox, Cleveland Indians), heart attack.
- Robert Skeris, 89, American Roman Catholic priest.
- Nawab Yousuf Talpur, 82, Pakistani politician, MNA (since 2002).
- Marian Turski, 98, Polish historian, journalist and Holocaust survivor.

=== 19 ===
- Tom Beauchamp, 85, American philosopher (Hume and the Problem of Causation).
- Kent Bernard, 82, Trinidadian athlete, Olympic bronze medallist (1964).
- Nicolás Antonio Castellanos Franco, 90, Spanish Roman Catholic prelate and missionary, bishop of Palencia (1978–1991).
- Eduardo Cerda, 92, Chilean politician, deputy (1965–1971, 1990–1994, 2010–2014).
- Souleymane Cissé, 84, Malian film director (Yeelen, The Young Girl, Waati).
- Gholamhossein Farzami, 79, Iranian footballer (Taj, national team).
- Snowy Fleet, 85, English-born Australian drummer (The Easybeats).
- Robert Giblin, 72, American football player (New York Giants, St. Louis Cardinals).
- Janez Gorjanc, 77, Slovenian Olympic skier (1972). (death announced on this date)
- Joe Haines, 97, British journalist and public servant, Downing Street press secretary (1969–1970, 1974–1976).
- Chuck Hardwick, 83, American politician, member (1978–1992) and speaker (1986–1990) of the New Jersey General Assembly, complications from amyotrophic lateral sclerosis.
- Richard Highton, 97, American herpetologist.
- Stanley Inhorn, 96, American pathologist.
- Sandra Jayat, 94, French writer and artist.
- S. K. Kaul, 89, Indian air force officer, chief of the air staff (1993–1995).
- William Morris Kinnersley, 81, American physicist.
- Glenn Knight, 80, Singaporean lawyer, director of the Commercial Affairs Department (1984–1991).
- Frits Korthals Altes, 93, Dutch politician, minister of justice (1982–1989), president of the Senate (1997–2001) and minister of state (since 2001).
- Jan Eugeniusz Krysiński, 89, Polish scientist.
- Mike Lange, 76, American sportscaster (Pittsburgh Penguins).
- Jerry Latin, 71, American football player (Northern Illinois Huskies, St. Louis Cardinals, Los Angeles Rams).
- Fernando Madeira, 92, Portuguese Olympic swimmer (1952) and water polo player (1952).
- Marion Meadmore, 89, Canadian Ojibwa-Cree activist and lawyer.
- Cammy Murray, 80, Scottish footballer (St Mirren, Motherwell, Arbroath).
- Niles Nelson, 87, American college football coach (Rhode Island, Methodist, Husson).
- Papa Clem, 19, American Thoroughbred racehorse. (death announced on this date)
- Milind Rege, 76, Indian cricketer (West Zone, Bombay).
- Hughen Riley, 77, English footballer (Crewe Alexandra, Rochdale, Bournemouth), leukemia.
- N'Diaga Samb, 58, Senegalese draughts player.
- Jean Sarrus, 79, French singer, composer (Les Charlots) and actor (Stadium Nuts, Les Bidasses en folie).
- Manuel Sérgio, 91, Portuguese philosopher and politician, MP (1991–1995).
- Shyam Singh Shashi, 89, Indian anthropologist.
- Wild Bill Shrewsberry, 86, American drag racing driver.
- Jay Stevens, 71, American writer.
- Olive Sturgess, 91, Canadian-born American actress (The Kettles in the Ozarks, The Raven, Requiem for a Gunfighter).
- Arturo Torró, 62, Spanish businessman and politician, mayor of Gandia (2011–2015), shot.
- Howard Kent Walker, 89, American diplomat, ambassador to Togo (1982–1984) and Madagascar (1989–1992).
- Willie Walsh, 90, Irish Roman Catholic prelate, bishop of Killaloe (1994–2010).
- Zakaria Ariffin, 72, Malaysian playwright and theatre director, stroke.

=== 20 ===
- Feroz Ahmad, 87, Turkish-American academic and historian.
- Daniel Bisogno, 51, Mexican television actor and host, complications from liver and kidney transplant surgery.
- David Boren, 83, American politician and academic, governor of Oklahoma (1975–1979), member of the U.S. Senate (1979–1994), and president of the University of Oklahoma (1994–2018).
- James Broselow, 82, American emergency physician and inventor (Broselow tape).
- Jerry Butler, 85, American Hall of Fame soul singer-songwriter ("Only the Strong Survive", "He Will Break Your Heart"), musician (The Impressions) and politician, complications from Parkinson's disease.
- Kouaro Yves Chabi, 51, Beninese politician, traffic collision.
- Kejong Chang, 90, Indian politician, Nagaland MLA (since 1998).
- Wafula Chebukati, 63, Kenyan civil servant, chairman of IEBC (2017–2023).
- Lawrence S. Cunningham, 89, American religious scholar.
- Reg Douglas, 94, New Zealand Olympic rower (1956).
- Frankétienne, 88, Haitian writer (Dézafi), poet and painter (Désastre (12 janvier 2010), Difficile émergence vers la lumière).
- Erhard Hofeditz, 71, German footballer (KSV Baunatal, TSV 1860 Munich, 1. FC Kaiserslautern), cancer.
- David Hughes, 90, English cricketer (Somerset).
- Peter Jason, 80, American actor (They Live, Deadwood, Mortal Kombat), cancer.
- John Johnson, 83, American football player (Chicago Bears, New York Giants).
- Friedrich-Wilhelm Junge, 86, German actor (SAS 181 Does Not Reply, Love's Confusion).
- Ellyn Kaschak, 81, American clinical psychologist.
- Ilkka Kuusisto, 91, Finnish composer, choirmaster and opera manager (Finnish National Opera).
- Mabel Landry, 92, American Olympic long jumper (1952), cancer.
- Richard M. Langworth, 83, American author.
- Hans Kjeld Rasmussen, 70, Danish sport shooter, Olympic champion (1980). (death announced on this date)
- Roger Romani, 90, French politician, senator (1977–1993, 2002–2011).
- Bidur Prasad Sapkota, 59, Nepali politician, MP (2014–2017), lung disease.
- Mawuli Semevo, 62–63, Ghanaian actor (A Stab in the Dark, Like Cotton Twines, The Good Old Days: The Love of AA), injuries sustained in a fire.
- George M. Sheldrick, 82, British chemist.
- Syafruddin Kambo, 63, Indonesian politician and police officer, minister of PANRB (2018–2019) and deputy chief of police (2016–2018), heart attack.
- Wael Talaat, 60, Egyptian snooker player.
- Sir Peter Trapski, 89, New Zealand lawyer and judge, chief judge of the District Court (1985–1989).
- Evan Williams, 81, Scottish footballer (Wolverhampton Wanderers, Celtic, Clyde).

=== 21 ===
- A. H. Amin, 64, Pakistani military historian, cancer.
- John Anderson, 86, New Zealand businessman (Contiki Tours).
- Larry Appelbaum, 67, American audio engineer and jazz historian, pneumonia.
- Shamsuddin Azeemi, 97, Pakistani Islamic scholar.
- Alf Bakke, 97, Norwegian forester and entomologist.
- Yvonne Curtet, 104, French Olympic long jumper (1948, 1952), complications from Alzheimer's disease.
- Khalil Fong, 41, Hong Kong singer-songwriter.
- Martha Gorman Schultz, 93, American Diné weaver.
- Clint Hill, 93, American Secret Service agent present at the assassination of John F. Kennedy.
- Ioan James, 96, British mathematician.
- Dame Julie Kenny, 67, English businesswoman.
- Christopher Laurence, 95, English Anglican clergyman, archdeacon of Lindsey (1985–1994).
- Kelly Mark, 57–58, Canadian artist.
- Gwen McCrae, 81, American singer ("Rockin' Chair").
- Kilmer S. McCully, 91, American pathologist, prostate cancer.
- Brendan McFarlane, 73–74, Irish republican militant (Provisional IRA).
- Herbert Mertin, 66, German politician, member of the Landtag of Rhineland-Palatinate (1996–2011, since 2021).
- Hugues Oyarzabal, 39, French surfer, suicide.
- Erik Petersen, 85, Danish rower, Olympic champion (1964).
- Michael Seirton, 87, British set decorator (Gandhi, Reds, The Shawshank Redemption), Oscar winner (1983).
- Lynne Marie Stewart, 78, American actress (Pee-wee's Playhouse, It's Always Sunny in Philadelphia, American Graffiti), cancer.
- Kuo-ch'ing Tu, 83, Taiwanese poet and literary scholar.
- Mary Jo White, 83, American politician, member of the Pennsylvania State Senate (1997–2013).
- David Williams, 98, Welsh trade union leader, general secretary of the Confederation of Health Service Employees (1983–1987).

=== 22 ===
- Linsey Alexander, 82, American songwriter, vocalist and guitarist.
- Maha Bayrakdar, 77, Syrian-Lebanese poet.
- Hans van den Broek, 88, Dutch politician and diplomat, minister of foreign affairs (1982–1993), European commissioner (1993–1999) and minister of state (since 2005), complications from Alzheimer's disease.
- John Casey, 86, American novelist (Spartina), complications from dementia.
- D Fuse, 54–55, American producer, remixer and disc jockey.
- Colette Doherty, Irish poker player.
- Bill Fay, 81, English singer-songwriter, complications from Parkinson's disease.
- Joe Fusco, 87, American Hall of Fame college football coach (Westminster College).
- Lawal Yahaya Gumau, 56, Nigerian politician, senator (2018–2023).
- Alison Halford, 84, Welsh police officer and politician, AM (1999–2003).
- Chris Hawthorn, 88, British Anglican priest, archdeacon of Cleveland (1991–2001).
- Ishsam Shahruddin, 58, Malaysian politician, Perak State MLA (2022–2024).
- Valeriy Kalchenko, 77, Ukrainian politician, minister of emergency situations (1996–1999) and MP (2006–2014).
- Lílian, 76, Brazilian singer and composer, cancer.
- Jorge Mariné, 83, Spanish Olympic cyclist (1964).
- Geoffrey Maxwell, Jamaican football player (national team) and manager (Waterhouse, national team), complications from Alzheimer's disease.
- Manuel Michelena Iguarán, 84, Spanish engineer and politician, member of the Basque Parliament (2007–2011).
- Martin O'Malley, 86, Canadian journalist and writer.
- Ken Parker, 76, Jamaican reggae musician.
- Gianni Pettenati, 79, Italian singer and music critic.
- Mayadhar Raut, 94, Indian Odissi dancer.
- Bernhard Seiler, 94, Swiss agronomist and politician, member of the Council of States (1987–1999).
- Bruce M. Selya, 90, American jurist, judge of the U.S. District Court for Rhode Island (1982–1986) and the U.S. Court of Appeals for the First Circuit (since 1986).
- Enos Semore, 93, American baseball coach (Oklahoma Sooners).
- Christopher Sepulvado, 81, American convicted murderer.
- Mark L. Tidd, 69, American rear admiral.
- Pirkko Vahtero, 88, Finnish graphic designer and heraldist.

=== 23 ===
- Víctor Angles Vargas, 97, Peruvian historian.
- Donald Braben, 89, British physicist and author.
- Pilar Del Rey, 95, American actress (Giant).
- Larry Dolan, 94, American attorney and baseball executive, owner of the Cleveland Guardians (since 2001) and founder of SportsTime Ohio.
- Ming Fay, 82, Chinese-born American sculptor.
- John Fordtran, 93, American gastroenterologist.
- Joseph Gitnig, 95, American street performer and poet.
- Greg Haugen, 64, American boxer, IBF lightweight (1986–1987, 1988–1989) and WBO junior welterweight (1991) champion, cancer.
- Eddie Hill, 67, American football player (Los Angeles Rams, Miami Dolphins), brain cancer.
- Chris Jasper, 73, American Hall of Fame singer (The Isley Brothers, Isley-Jasper-Isley), songwriter ("Caravan of Love"), keyboardist and producer, cancer.
- Jan Johnson, 74, American pole vaulter, Olympic bronze medallist (1972).
- Tahir Mahmood Khan, 68, Pakistani politician, member of the Provincial Assembly of Balochistan (2013–2018).
- Thanin Kraivichien, 97, Thai politician, prime minister (1976–1977) and acting president of the Privy Council (2016).
- Bobby Malkmus, 93, American baseball player (Milwaukee Braves, Washington Senators, Philadelphia Phillies).
- Robert Marc Mazo, 94, American theoretical physical chemist.
- Al Trautwig, 68, American sports commentator (MSG Network, ABC, NBC), complications from cancer.
- Annett Wolf, 88, Dutch-American director (Jack Lemmon – A Twist of Lemmon, The World of Alfred Hitchcock) and producer.

=== 24 ===
- Zahidur Rahman Anjan, 60, Bangladeshi film director (Meghmallar), liver disease.
- Kevin Braswell, 46, American-New Zealand basketball player (Southland Sharks) and coach (Wellington Saints), complications from heart surgery.
- Hasan Çelebi, 88, Turkish calligrapher.
- Johnny Culloty, 88, Irish Gaelic footballer and hurler (Killarney Legion, St Patrick's, Kerry).
- Gabrielle Davis, 86, English politician, sheriff of Canterbury (2009–2010).
- Roberta Flack, 88, American singer ("Killing Me Softly with His Song", "The First Time Ever I Saw Your Face", "Feel Like Makin' Love"), Grammy winner (1973, 1974), complications from amyotrophic lateral sclerosis.
- Rose Girone, 113, Polish-American supercentenarian and Holocaust survivor.
- Christy Hartburg, 77, American model and actress (Supervixens).
- Wilma Iggers, 103, Czech-born German-American Germanist and cultural historian.
- Jeong Su-il, 90, South Korean historian.
- Ralph Jezzard, 59, English bass guitarist (Grand Theft Audio) and music producer.
- Robert John, 79, American singer ("Sad Eyes", "If You Don't Want My Love", "The Lion Sleeps Tonight").
- Ricardo Kanji, 76, Brazilian flautist (Orchestra of the Eighteenth Century), conductor and academic teacher (Royal Conservatory of The Hague), brain cancer.
- Piet van Katwijk, 74, Dutch Olympic cyclist (1972).
- István Kecskés, 77, Hungarian-born American linguist and academic.
- Azusa Kishimoto, 39, Japanese model, cancer.
- Fumi Kitahara, 56, American animation publicist, complications from blood cancer.
- Sir Kenneth Macdonald, 94, British civil servant.
- Alan Lindsay Mackay, 98, British crystallographer.
- Roy Majtyka, 85, American baseball manager (Atlanta Braves).
- Thaddeus Matthews, 67, American pastor and broadcaster.
- Richard Pierard, 90, American historian.
- Gerardo Pierro, 89, Italian Roman Catholic prelate, archbishop of Salerno-Campagna-Acerno (1992–2010), bishop of Tursi-Lagonegro (1981–1987) and Avellino (1987–1992).
- Royce Pollard, 85, American politician, mayor of Vancouver, Washington (1996–2010).
- Alvin Francis Poussaint, 90, American psychiatrist and author.
- Alberto Rodrigues, 79, Portuguese Olympic equestrian (1992).
- Ekhard Salje, 78–79, German-British academic.
- Laura Sessions Stepp, 73, American author and journalist.
- Peter Sichel, 102, German-American wine merchant.
- Keith Slater, 89, Australian cricketer (Western Australia, national team) and footballer (Swan Districts).
- Josefina Villalobos, 100, American-born Colombian-Ecuadorian public servant, first lady of Ecuador (1992–1996).
- Frank G. Wisner, 86, American diplomat, acting secretary of state (1993), ambassador to India (1994–1997) and Egypt (1986–1991), lung cancer.

=== 25 ===
- Krista Aru, 66, Estonian historian of journalism, museologist, and politician, MP (2015–2019).
- Bejo Sugiantoro, 47, Indonesian football player (Persebaya Surabaya, national team) and manager, heart attack.
- Vladimir Beșleagă, 93, Moldovan writer and politician, MP (1990–1994).
- Bernard Brochand, 86, French politician, MP (2001–2022) and mayor of Cannes (2001–2014), and football executive (Paris Saint-Germain).
- Baoan Coleman, 85, American actor (Hey Arnold!, Rambo: First Blood Part II, Rules of Engagement).
- Guy Comtois, 63, American politician, member of the New Hampshire House of Representatives (2010–2016).
- Robert Coogan, 95, Australian-born British clergyman, archdeacon of Hampstead (1985–1994).
- Ronald Draper, 98, South African cricketer (Eastern Province, Griqualand West, national team).
- Arthur Firstenberg, 74, American author and activist.
- Bobby Frame, 65, American politician, member of the Oklahoma House of Representatives (1997–2001).
- Janice Moore Fuller, 73, American poet and playwright.
- Margaret Gale, 93, English soprano.
- Inmaculada García Rioja, 70, Spanish physician and politician, member of Cortes of Castile and León (2019–2020, since 2022).
- Shotsie Gorman, 73, American tattoo artist, painter and sculptor.
- Bryn Griffiths, 92, Welsh poet.
- Bob Hagan, 85, Australian rugby league player and coach (Canterbury-Bankstown Bulldogs).
- Jennifer Johnston, 95, Irish novelist (How Many Miles to Babylon?, The Christmas Tree, The Illusionist), complications from dementia.
- Karen Karagezyan, 89, Russian journalist, translator and presidential press secretary (Mikhail Gorbachev).
- Henry Kelly, 78, Irish television presenter (Going for Gold, Game for a Laugh).
- Yvonne Knibiehler, 102, French academic and essayist.
- Edward E. Leamer, 80, American economist.
- Alberto Lina, 76, Filipino civil servant, commissioner of the Bureau of Customs (2005, 2015–2016).
- Simon Lindley, 76, English organist, master of the music (Leeds Minster) and composer.
- Bruce MacCarthy, 76, Australian politician, New South Wales MLA (1996–1999).
- Martin E. Marty, 97, American Lutheran historian and academic.
- Lis Nilheim, 80, Swedish actress (Maria, Madicken på Junibacken, Raskenstam).
- Abdullah Al Noman, 82, Bangladeshi politician, twice MP, minister of food (2002–2004) and fisheries (2004–2006), cardiac arrest.
- Roberto Orci, 51, Mexican-born American screenwriter (Star Trek, Transformers) and television producer (Fringe), kidney disease.
- Ferenc Rados, 90, Hungarian pianist and academic (Franz Liszt Academy of Music).
- Vimala Rangachar, 96, Indian educationist.
- Kazimierz Romaniuk, 97, Polish Roman Catholic prelate, auxiliary bishop of Warsaw (1982–1992) and bishop of Warsaw-Praga (1992–2004).
- Ray Ryan, 43, Irish hurler (Sarsfields, Cork).
- Kala Nath Shastry, 88, Indian linguist and Sanskrit scholar.
- Milko Šparemblek, 96, Slovenian-born Croatian ballet dancer, choreographer, and stage director.
- Kathy Swanson, 77, American politician, member of the Montana House of Representatives (2011–2019).
- Mikhail Vasilyev, 63, Russian handball player, Olympic champion (1988).

=== 26 ===
- Anike Agbaje-Williams, 88, Nigerian newsreader.
- Richard W. Bastraw, 90, American politician, member of the New Hampshire House of Representatives (1982–1986).
- Barry Beitzel, 90, Australian footballer (Carlton).
- Paul Bronfman, 67, Canadian film and television executive.
- Vesna Bučić, 98, Croatian art historian.
- Joseph A. Burns, 83, American academic.
- Jean Campeau, 93, Canadian businessman and politician, Quebec MNA (1994–1998).
- Jack Coughlin, 93, American artist and painter.
- Susan DeFreitas, 47, American author, complications from cancer.
- Dave Frankel, 67, American news anchor and weatherman (WPVI-TV, KYW-TV), complications from primary progressive aphasia.
- Jim Hatfield, 81, American basketball coach (Kentucky Wildcats, Louisiana Ragin' Cajuns, Mississippi State Bulldogs).
- Pierre Joris, 78, Luxembourgish-American poet and writer.
- Anil Joshi, 84, Indian poet and essayist.
- Kim Tae-young, 76, South Korean military officer, minister of national defense (2009–2010).
- Tetiana Kulyk, 42, Ukrainian journalist, airstrike.
- Marie Lederer, 97, American politician, member of the Pennsylvania House of Representatives (1993–2007).
- James Lockhart, 94, Scottish conductor, pianist and organist, complications from dementia.
- Bjørn Ludvigsen, 56, Norwegian footballer (Tromsø).
- Lóránt Lukács, 90, Hungarian motorcycle racer and cinematographer.
- Monika Lundi, 82, German actress (The Heath Is Green, Crazy – Completely Mad, No Gold for a Dead Diver).
- Gabriel Maralngurra, 56, Australian Kunwinjku artist.
- Fernando Martínez Mottola, 70–71, Venezuelan politician, minister of transport and communications (1992–1993).
- Richard Osborne, 71, American football player (Philadelphia Eagles, New York Jets, St. Louis Cardinals).
- Panty Raid, 20, American Thoroughbred racehorse, euthanized.
- Hans Pirkner, 78, Austrian footballer (Austria Wien, Alpine, national team).
- Ryu Keun-chan, 75, South Korean news anchor (KBS News 9) and politician, MP (2004–2012).
- Renen Schorr, 72, Israeli film director, screenwriter, and film producer.
- Kjell Alrich Schumann, 58, Norwegian convicted robber and murderer, glioblastoma.
- Ranald Sutherland, Lord Sutherland, 93, Scottish judge.
- Carol Sutton, 79, American-born Canadian artist.
- Michelle Trachtenberg, 39, American actress (Buffy the Vampire Slayer, Harriet the Spy, Gossip Girl), complications from diabetes.
- Corry Vreeken, 96, Dutch chess player.
- Kevin Webb, 96, Australian rules footballer (Richmond, Melbourne).
- Erica Willis, 90, Australian Olympic long jumper (1956).
- Zhao Fazhen, 89, Chinese aquaculturist.

=== 27 ===
- Melody Beattie, 76, American self-help author, heart failure.
- Gary Birdsong, 81, American preacher.
- Christopher Chaplin, 86, British cricketer (Cornwall).
- Javier Dorado, 48, Spanish footballer (Salamanca, Rayo Vallecano, Sporting de Gijón).
- Nahomi Edamoto, 69, Japanese culinary expert, interstitial pneumonia.
- Derya Erke, 41, Turkish Olympic swimmer (2000, 2004), cancer.
- Allan Furlong, 83, Canadian politician, Ontario MPP (1987–1990).
- Stanisław Gebhardt, 96, Polish resistance fighter and economist.
- Nelson H. H. Graburn, 88, British anthropologist.
- Steve Hardy, 67, Canadian Olympic swimmer (1976).
- Greg Hoard, 73, American journalist and sportswriter.
- Lee Kunzman, 80, American racing driver (CART).
- Kathryn Kynoch, 83, Scottish painter.
- Paul L. Maier, 94, American Lutheran clergyman and historian.
- Uttam Mohanty, 66, Indian actor (Naya Zaher, Ae Jugara Krushna Sudama, Purushottam), cirrhosis.
- Jack Morneau, 99, Canadian football player (Ottawa Rough Riders).
- Michael Moroney, 66, New Zealand Hall of Fame racehorse trainer, cancer.
- George Nicholson, 87, British Olympic sailor (1960). (death announced on this date)
- Anita Nüßner, 89, German sprint canoeist, world championship bronze medalist (1963).
- Elijah Olaniyi, 26, American basketball player (Stony Brook Seawolves, Miami Hurricanes), brain cancer.
- Bjørn Opsahl, 56, Norwegian photographer and film director, suicide.
- Kim Pérez, 83, Spanish LGBT rights activist.
- Michael Preece, 88, American director (The Prize Fighter, Dallas, Walker, Texas Ranger), heart failure.
- Roy Prosterman, 89, American legal scholar and land reform advocate.
- P. Raju, 73, Indian politician, Kerala MLA (1991–1996).
- Jane Reed, 84, British publishing executive.
- Kjartan Rødland, 86, Norwegian journalist and newspaper editor (Bergens Tidende).
- Boris Spassky, 88, Russian chess grandmaster, world champion (1969–1972).
- Larry Tanimoto, 80, American politician, mayor of Hawaiʻi County (1990).
- Marvin Wijks, 40, Dutch footballer (HFC Haarlem, Rijnsburgse Boys, 1. FC Magdeburg), stroke.

=== 28 ===
- Mohamed Benaissa, 88, Moroccan politician, minister of foreign affairs (1999–2007).
- Trevan Clough, 82, Papua New Guinean Olympic sport shooter (1976, 1984).
- Stan Fail, 88, American Olympic speed skater (1964).
- Michael Frimkess, 88, American ceramic artist.
- Nick Gandon, 68, English cricketer (Hertfordshire, Lincolnshire, Oxford University), cancer.
- Alain Grée, 88, French illustrator and author.
- Juul Haalmeyer, 75, Dutch-Canadian costume designer.
- Hamid Ul Haq Haqqani, 56, Pakistani Islamic scholar and politician, MNA (2002–2007), bombing.
- Clarence Hoffman, 91, American politician, member of the Iowa House of Representatives (1999–2009).
- David Johansen, 75, American musician (New York Dolls), singer ("Hot Hot Hot") and actor (Scrooged), cancer.
- Carson Jones, 38, American boxer, complications from gastrointestinal surgery.
- Alexis Kougias, 74, Greek lawyer and penologist, cancer.
- Antje-Katrin Kühnemann, 80, German physician and television presenter.
- Richard Marable, 75, American politician, member of the Georgia State Senate (1991–2003).
- Anneliese Meggl, 86, German Olympic alpine skier.
- Bill Mulcahy, 90, Irish rugby union player (Leinster, national team).
- Osamu Nishimura, 53, Japanese professional wrestler (NJPW, AJPW), esophageal cancer.
- Tuppy Owens, 80, British sexual health campaigner and writer, vascular dementia.
- Ebun Oyagbola, 93, Nigerian politician and diplomat.
- Miguel Piñera, 70, Chilean musician and nightclub owner, multiple organ failure.
- Bob Sharp, 85, American racing driver.
- Temmy Shmull, 77, Paluan government minister, governor of Peleliu (2013–2022).
- Ayako Sono, 93, Japanese writer.
- Luke Trembath, 38, Australian snowboarder, media personality, and entrepreneur.
- Olen Underwood, 82, American football player (Houston Oilers, New York Giants, Denver Broncos).
- Joseph Wambaugh, 88, American author (The Onion Field, Echoes in the Darkness, The Blue Knight), esophageal cancer.
- Wang Maohua, 92, Chinese agricultural engineer.
- Yu Huaying, 61, Chinese child kidnapper and trafficker, executed.
