= Oyarzabal =

Oyarzabal is a Basque surname. Notable people with the surname include:

- Antonio de Oyarzabal (born 1935), Spanish diplomat and politician
- Gloria Oyarzabal (born 1971), Spanish visual artist and teacher
- Hugues Oyarzabal (1985–2025), French surfer
- Iñaki Oyarzabal (born 1966), Spanish politician
- Isabel Oyarzábal Smith (1878–1974), Spanish journalist, writer, actress and diplomat
- José Ramón Oyarzábal (born 1957), Spanish rower
- José Oyarzabal (French rower) (born 1970), French rower
- Mario Oyarzabal (born 1969), Argentine jurist, diplomat and professor
- Mikel Oyarzabal (born 1997), Spanish footballer
