= Sisira =

Sisira is a given name. Notable people with the name include:

- Sisira de Abrew (fl. 1978), Sri Lankan judge
- Sisira Jayakody (born 1965), Sri Lankan politician
- Sisira Jayasuriya (fl. 2009), Sri Lankan academic
- Sisira Mendis (fl. 1972–2019), Sri Lankan police officer
- Sisira Senaratne (1935–2015), Sri Lankan singer

== See also ==
- Sisira Well, well in Saudi Arabia
