= Drenth =

Drenth (Dutch pronunciation: [ˈdrɛnt]) is a Dutch toponymic surname indicating an origin in the province of Drenthe. Variant forms are Drent, Drenthe, Drenthen and Van Drenth. People with this surname include:

- Elt Drenth (1949–1998), Dutch freestyle swimmer
- Herman Drenth (1892–1932), Dutch-American serial killer known as "Harry Powers"
- Jan Drenth (1925–2025), Dutch chemist
- Max Drenth (born 1963), Dutch writer, philosopher and columnist known as "Maxim Februari"

Drent

- Ido Drent (born 1987), South African actor in New Zealand
- Martin Drent (born 1970), Dutch football striker

Drenthe

- Eugène Drenthe (1925–2009), Surinamese poet and playwright
- Giovanni Drenthe (born 1990), Surinamese football striker
- Royston Drenthe (born 1987), Dutch football winger and rapper
