= Kazimierz Rafalik =

Polish Sculptor (1938–2025)

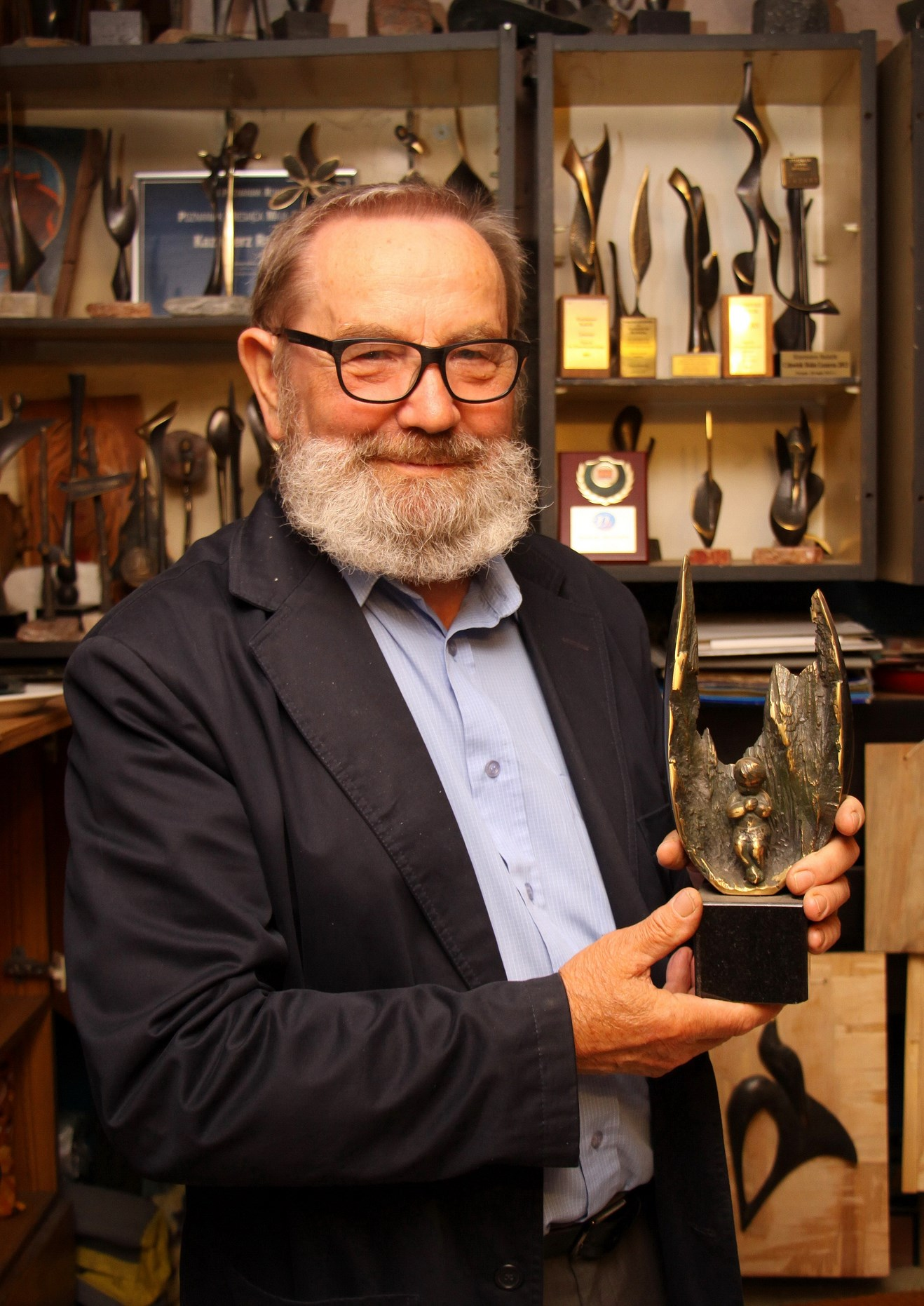
- Rafalik in his Workshop, Poznań, 2017
- Born: 2 May 1938; Błędów, Radom County, Second Polish Republic
- Died: 13 February 2025 (aged 86); Poznań, Poland
- Resting place: Cmentarz Górczyński, Poznań
- Occupation: Sculptor

Kazimierz Rafalik (2 May 1938 – 13 February 2025) was a Polish sculptor, photographer, publicist, social activist, graduate of the Poznań University of Technology, member of the Association of Polish Sculptors, the Association of Visual Artists, the Greater Poland Association of Sculptors and the Ecological Association of Creative Communities "Ekoart".

== Creativity ==
Rafalik created individual figurative forms and complex compositions combining many materials. For his work, he used, among others: bronze, brass, acid-resistant steel, wood and plastics.

He was the creator of many plaques, including those at the Monument to the 600th Anniversary of the Battle of Grunwald in Poznań, medals and statuettes.

== Exhibitions and expositions ==
The artist exhibited his works at over 200 exhibitions in the country, including: the Salon of Contemporary Art in Koszalin, BWA in Wrocław, the Henryk Sienkiewicz Museum in Poznań, the Gallery of the Association of Polish Sculptors in Warsaw, and the Sculpture Biennial; and abroad (Czech Republic, Germany, USA, Greece, Bulgaria, Lithuania).

== Awards and distinctions ==
- Award of the Ministry of Culture and Art (1989)
- Person of the Year of "Gazeta Poznańska" (2005)
- October Award of the City of Wrocław (2006)
- Person of the Year "Lazarus" Poznań
- WZAP founding members award
- IANICIUS Award named after Klemens Janicki for services to Polish culture
- FENIKS expressionist award named after Tadeusz Miciński
- Award for activities for the integration of arts named after Jerzy Sulima-Kamiński
- Silver medal "Labor Omnia Vincit" for promoting the idea of organic work from the Society. Hipolit Cegielski in Poznań
- Golden Cross of Merit (2022)
