= Alan Hobbs =

English cricketer (1944–2025)

Alan David Hobbs (11 March 1944 – 13 February 2025) was an English cricketer. He was a right-handed batsman and right-arm medium-pace bowler who played for Cambridgeshire. He was born in Cambridge.

Hobbs made a single List A appearance for the team, during the 1965 Gillette Cup, scoring 4 runs against Warwickshire. He also made three appearances in the Minor Counties Championship for Cambridgeshire.

Hobbs was from a cricketing family with his great-uncle being Jack Hobbs. Alan Hobbs' father, Ernest, played for Cambridgeshire in the Minor Counties Championship between 1927 and 1938 and worked 40 years as groundsman at Clare College Sports Ground where Cambridge Granta Cricket Club were based. After his own three-year stint as assistant groundsman at Edgbaston Cricket Ground, Alan Hobbs returned to Cambridge Granta where he served as captain and first-team manager in over 50 years of involvement with the club. He died in February 2025, at the age of 80.
