= Yvonne Knibiehler =

French historian

Yvonne Knibiehler, née Azaïs (5 October 1922 - 25 February 2025) was a French academic, essayist, historian and feminist, specializing in the history of women and motherhood.

== Biography ==
Yvonne Knibiehler completed her higher education in Montpellier from 1940 to 1944. She obtained the agrégation (award for teaching in history and geography) in 1945, then taught at the girls' high school in Nîmes (later the Feuchères College). In 1948, she received a research grant from the Vatican Library for a thesis on Bernard of Clairvaux.

In 1949, she married Jean Knibiehler. She abandoned research, taught in secondary schools, and raised three children. She lived in Morocco from 1949 to 1954 and taught at the boys' high school in Oujda. She then taught in Enghien, then at the Théodore-Aubanel girls' high school in Avignon until 1964.

In 1962, she began a doctoral thesis at the University of Aix-en-Provence. She defended her doctoral thesis in November 1970 on François-Auguste Mignet. She was an assistant professor and then lecturer in 1970. She became a professor in 1972 at Aix-Marseille University. She retired from teaching in 1984, after specializing in the history of women, family, and health.

In 1971, she and Christiane Souriau created the first courses on women. She founded the CEFUP (Center for Women's Studies at the University of Provence), which organized its first conference in 1975 entitled "Women and the Human Sciences".

In 1989, she was one of the founders of the Association of Women and the City, which supports women in their professional, maternal, and political activities.

In 2009, she founded the Demeter-Core association in Aix-en-Provence, which brings together university researchers, association leaders, and field researchers to create a permanent hub for research, reflection, and action on the theme of Motherhood, Women, and Gender in the Mediterranean region.

She is the author of A History of Mothers and Motherhood in the West, a work ranked among "the 25 feminist books you must have read" by the Swiss daily Le Temps.

She died in Aix-en-Provence (Bouches-du-Rhône) on February 25, 2025, at the age of 102.
