= Nahomi Edamoto =

Japanese culinary expert (1955–2025)

- Born: Nahomi Azuma; March 22, 1955; Yokohama, Japan
- Died: February 27, 2025 (aged 69); Tokyo, Japan
- Education: Meiji University

Nahomi Azuma (Japanese: 東菜穂美), known professionally as Nahomi Edamoto (Japanese: 枝元なほみ; March 22, 1955 – February 27, 2025), was a Japanese culinary expert. She wrote various cookbooks and frequently appeared on Japanese cooking shows.

== Biography ==
Nahomi Azuma was born in Yokohama, Japan in 1955.

After graduating from Meiji University, she aspired to be an actress and was involved in the Tenkei Gekijo theater troupe in Tokyo. Because she had learned some cooking skills while working part-time in a restaurant to support her acting career, she became responsible for feeding the theater troupe, which started her on her culinary journey.

When the troupe disbanded, around 1990, she began writing articles on cooking for a magazine. She would go on to write for various publications including the Mainichi Shinbun, becoming known by the pen name Nahomi Edamoto.

Edamoto became a well-known cooking expert in Japan. She wrote many books, including "Nahomi Edamoto's Real Breakfast," "Advice for Cooking and Life," and (in collaboration with Hiromi Itō) "What Did You Eat?" She also frequently appeared on cooking shows on NHK, CBS, and TBS.

In 2006, she was featured in a video game for the Nintendo DS, "Nahomi Edamoto's Happy Kitchen," which was released in English translation as "Happy Cooking."

Edamoto was also known for her anti-poverty activism and disaster relief efforts around food. To this end, she was involved with the Big Issue Japan Foundation, writing for the organization's street publication that is sold by homeless people to earn money. She spearheaded the "Night Bakery" initiative, which purchased discounted bread that bakeries would otherwise throw away, then gave jobs selling it to unemployed people in need. She also founded the agricultural advocacy organization Team Mukago.

Nahomi Edamoto died in Tokyo in 2025 at age 69.
