= Senamile Masango =

South African nuclear scientist (1987–2025)

- Born: May 1987; Nongoma, KwaZulu-Natal, South Africa
- Died: 9 February 2025 (aged 37)
- Education: University of Zululand (no degree); University of the Western Cape (MS)
- Known for: South Africa's first black female nuclear scientist
- Scientific career
- Fields: Nuclear science
- Workplaces: South African Nuclear Energy Corporation

Senamile Masango (1987 – 9 February 2025) was South Africa's first black female nuclear scientist.

== Biography ==
Born in Nongoma in May 1987, Masango's mother was a Zulu princess and her father was a local leader. She grew up in a polygamous family, her mother being the youngest of her father's three wives. At the age of 16, she enrolled in the University of Zululand but dropped out due to early motherhood and academic struggles. Supported by her family, however, she was able to return to school and eventually earned a Master's Degree in nuclear physics from the University of the Western Cape.

In 2017, Masango became a researcher at the European Organization for Nuclear Research. In 2019, she was mentioned in the Mail & Guardian list of young South Africans to watch in science and technology.

Senamile Masango died on 9 February 2025, at the age of 37, following an illness.
