= Vesna Bučić =

Croatian art historian and museum curator

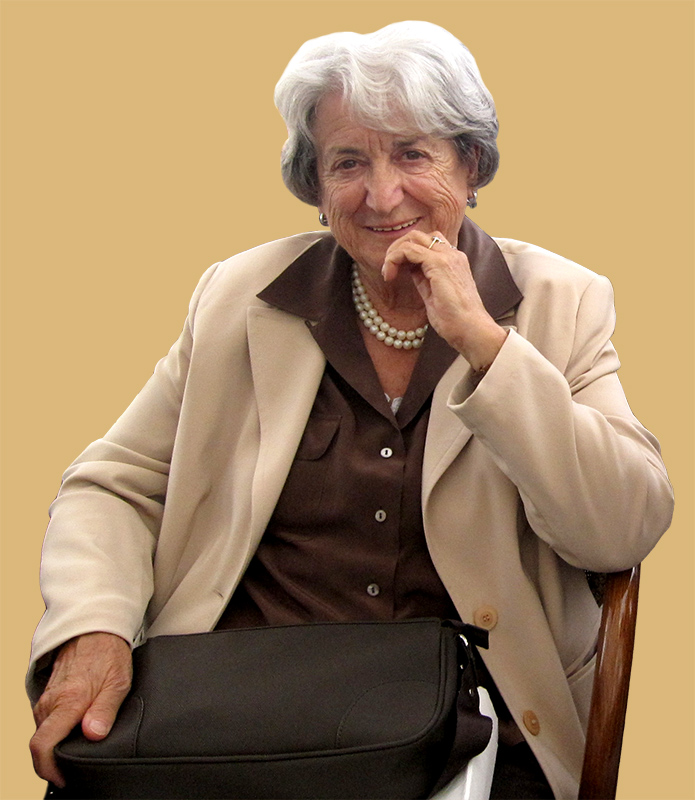
- in 2010
- Born: 2 December 1926; Zagreb, Croatia
- Died: 25 February 2025 (aged 98)
- Education: University of Ljubljana
- Known for: Art historian

Vesna Bučić (December 2, 1926 – 25 February 2025) was a Croatian art historian and museum curator. She was an expert in the history of Slovenian residences and applied arts in the twentieth century.

== Early life and education ==
Bučić was born and schooled in Zagreb, the capital of Croatia in 1926. Her parents, Jelka (born Darlić) and Visko Bučić, were from the island of Vis. She graduated from the University of Ljubljana. She had studied art history from 1952 to 1957.

She obtained her doctorate in 1993 with a dissertation on the old houses of Slovenia.

== Career ==
She published a number of books on the museums of her country including co-authoring a book in 1979 about the museums and galleries of Slovenia. She was particularly known for her knowledge of clocks.

She became the acknowledged expert in the history of residences and applied arts in Slovenia in the twentieth century.

== Death ==
She died on 25 February 2025 at the age of 98.

== Awards ==
In 1985 she received the Valvasor Award. This award is the highest award for museology. Four years later she was awarded the plaque of the Association of Museum Workers of Yugoslavia. In the following year she took the Zupančič Award. After her retirement in 1993 she became an honorary member of the Slovenian Museum Association in 1996.
