= Pirkko Vahtero =

Finnish graphic designer (1936–2025)

Pirkko Vahtero (16 December 1936 – 22 February 2025) was a Finnish graphic designer and heraldist. Over the course of time, Vahtero designed a number of Finnish postage stamps and securities. She designed around 140 Finnish stamps and also designed stamps for other countries such as Costa Rica, Denmark, El Salvador, Iceland, Kuwait, Lebanon, Norway, Sweden and Venezuela. Vahtero was born on 16 December 1936, and died on 22 February 2025, at the age of 88.

== Gallery of stamps designed by Vahtero ==
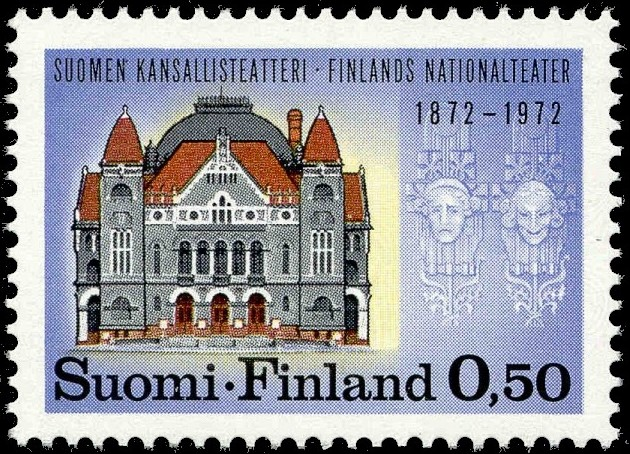
1972

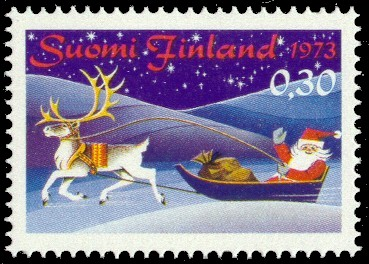
1973

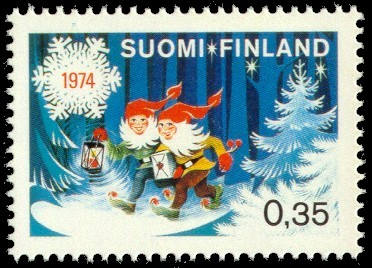
1974

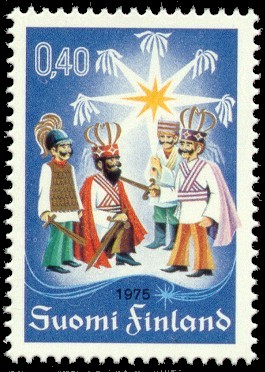
1975

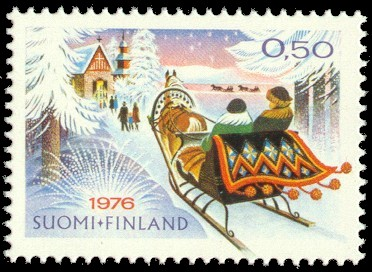
1976

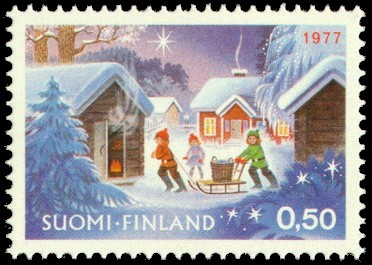
1977

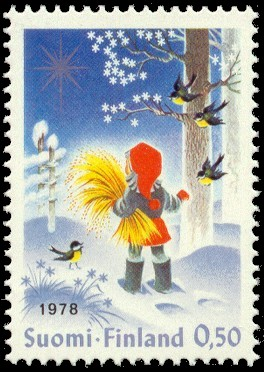
1978

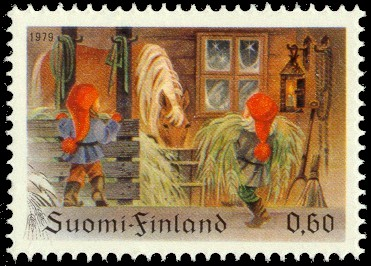
1979

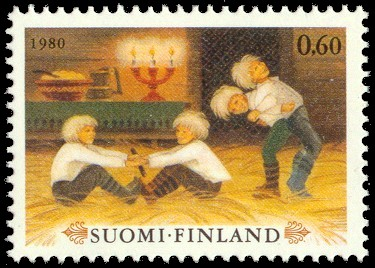
1980

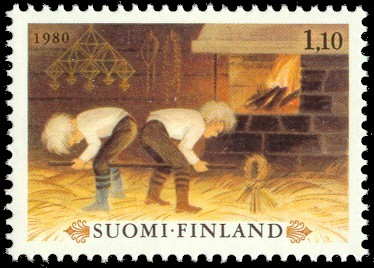
1980

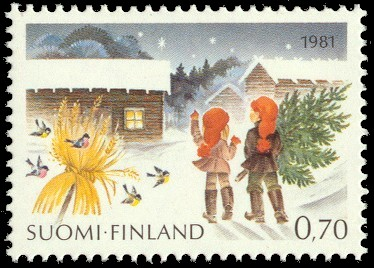
1981

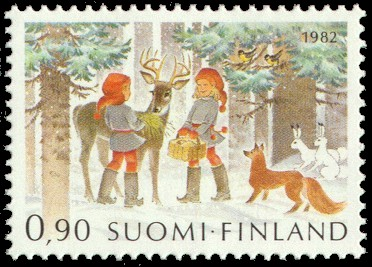
1982

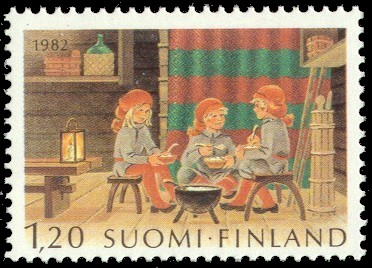
1982

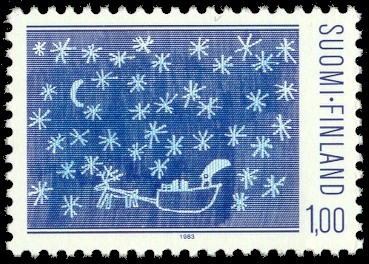
1983

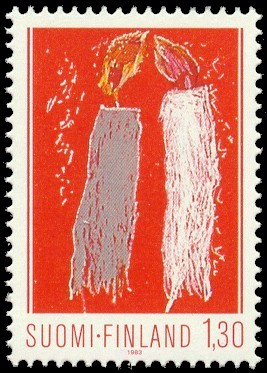
1983

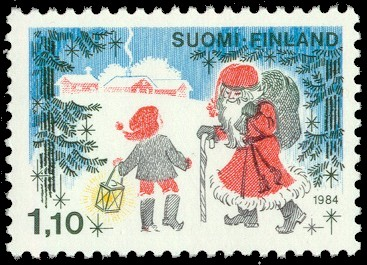
1984

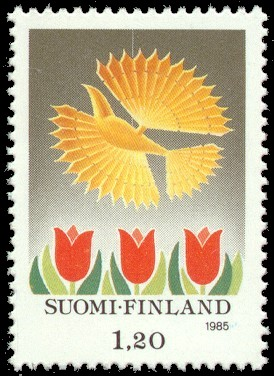
1985

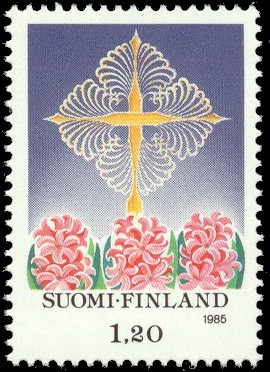
1985

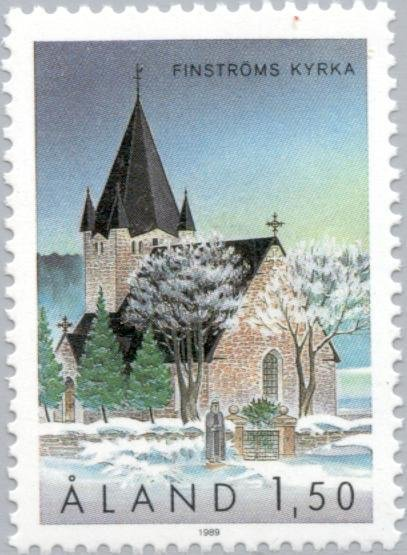
1989
