= Inmaculada García Rioja =

Spanish physician and politician (1954–2025)

Inmaculada García Rioja (1954 – 25 February 2025) was a Spanish physician and politician, member of the Cortes of Castile and León for the Socialist Party of Castile and León between 2019 and 2020, and again from 2022 until her death in 2025.

== Career ==
García Rioja was born in 1954 in Burgos, Spain. The family moved to Zamora when she was five. Her father was a military officer.

She graduated in Medicine from the University of Salamanca, where she joined the anti-Francoism activism, and worked as a family doctor in Puebla de Sanabria, Province of Zamora. In Benavente, Zamora, she worked as a pediatrician.

In 1994 García Rioja joined the Socialist Party of Castile and León and the UGT in 1996. In 2009, García Rioja temporarily withdrew from the party following an internal crisis.

García Rioja was elected member of the Cortes of Castile and León in the 2019 Castilian-Leonese regional election representing Zamora province. She was the spokesperson for the Health Commission until October 2020, when she resigned after testing positive in a breathalyzer test and was succeeded by Carlos Fernández Herrera. She was elected again in the 2022 regional election. She was chair of the Presiding Committee at both constituent sessions.

She died on 25 February 2025 at the age of 70 after a stroke. Her death was mourned by the regional president Alfonso Fernández Mañueco and other regional political leaders.
