= Mashkoor Raza =

Pakistani painter (died 2025)

Mashkoor Raza was a Pakistani painter and art educator. He studied at the Karachi School of Art.
