= Byron Guthrie =

Australian rules footballer

Personal information
- Full name: Byron Guthrie
- Born: 28 December 1935
- Died: 4 February 2025 (aged 89)
- Original team: University Blacks
- Height: 182 cm (6 ft 0 in)
- Weight: 80 kg (176 lb)

Playing career^{1}
| Years | Club | Games (Goals) |
| 1956–57 | Footscray | 4 (0) |
- ^{1} Playing statistics correct to the end of 1957.

Byron Guthrie (28 December 1935 – 4 February 2025) was an Australian rules footballer who played with Footscray in the Victorian Football League (VFL).

Guthrie died on 4 February 2025, at the age of 89.
