= Justice Azuka =

Nigerian politician (died 2025)

Justice Azuka (died February 2025) was a Nigerian politician who was a member of the Anambra State House of Assembly representing Onitsha North 1 Constituency before his death.

Before his death, the 40 year old legislator was a Labour Party chieftain who reclaimed his mandate after a court ruling nulified the victory of Douglas Egbuna of the Peoples Democratic Party in the 2023 election

Azuka was kidnapped on 24 December 2024, along Ugwunaobankpa Road in Inland Town, Onitsha, while he was on his way home for Christmas. His body was discovered near the Second Niger Bridge on 6 February 2025. No ransom was requested, nor was any payment made to the abductors.

He was laid to rest in his home town Ogbeoza Village, Onitsha. A burial mass was held at St. Mary's Catholic Church, Inland Town, Onitsha, presided over by Rev. Fr Prudentius Aroh, who represented Archbishop Valerian Okeke. Delivering the homily, Rev. Fr. John Bosco Okafor, Episcopal Vicar of the Onitsha Region, lamented the decline in the sanctity of the human life.

Azuka was the second Anambra lawmaker to be kidnapped and killed after Okechukwu Okoye in 2022.
