= Jack Morneau =

Canadian football player (1925–2025)

Profile
- Position: Tackle

Personal information
- Born: December 31, 1925; Windsor, Ontario, Canada
- Died: February 27, 2025 (aged 99); Ottawa, Ontario, Canada
- Listed height: 6 ft 0 in (1.83 m)
- Listed weight: 210 lb (95 kg)

Career history
- 1950–1951: Ottawa Rough Riders

Awards and highlights
- Grey Cup champion (1951)

John Edward Morneau (December 31, 1925 – February 27, 2025) was a Canadian professional football player who played for the Ottawa Rough Riders in the 1950s. He won the Grey Cup with them in 1951. Morneau previously attended and played football at Assumption College in Windsor, Ontario. He died in Ottawa, Ontario on February 27, 2025, at the age of 99.
