= Corey and Trina =

Canadian music and comedy duo

- Origin: St. John's, Newfoundland and Labrador, Canada
- Genres: Comedy music
- Past members: Corey Crewe; Trina Fulford

Corey and Trina (Corey Crewe and Trina Fulford) were musicians and comedians from St. John's, Newfoundland and Labrador, active for about 25 years beginning in the 1970s. A husband-and-wife team, they performed throughout all regions of Newfoundland and Labrador and were extremely popular on the island pub scene. One of their best known songs is "The Northern Lights of Labrador". Fulford died in 2007, and Crewe died in 2025.

== History ==
Corey and Trina began performing in 1973. In 1975, backed by The Country Ducats, they recorded some of their most popular tracks at Memorial University of Newfoundland. The album, Songs of Newfoundland--Corey and Trina's Variety Show, released on Audat Records, was a mix of traditional East Coast and country music, with covers of songs by Kris Kristofferson and Hank Williams Sr., as well as Corey's "Confederation Joe".

In 1978, their second album, Songs for Laughing and Dancing, was released on Quay Records. It was another eclectic mix, featuring Dolly Parton and Conway Twitty covers, and two of their own songs - "The Wolf is At the Door" and "The Northern Lights of Labrador", which was written by Trina's brother, Don Fulford.

In 1980, they released Corey & Trina III, then receded somewhat before moving to Calgary in the 1998. Trina died of cancer on 5 July 2007 in Calgary, Alberta. Following her death, Corey published a memoir of their career.

Corey and Trina are included in the top 20 of The Downhome Music Poll of favourite Newfoundland Songs and Musicians of All Time. Corey Crewe has released the duo's entire music catalogue plus two compilations on CD as he wished to keep Trina's music alive. A DVD of various live appearances of Corey and Trina has been released as a tribute to Trina Crewe.

Corey Crewe died on February 8, 2025, at the age of 80.

== See also ==
- Music of Newfoundland and Labrador
