= Antônio Fagundes de Souza =

Brazilian politician (1934–2025)

Member of the Legislative Assembly of Minas Gerais
- In office 1 February 1987 – 4 October 1988
- Succeeded by: Otacílio Oliveira de Miranda

Personal details
- Born: 12 August 1934 Santana do Garambéu, Minas Gerais, Brazil
- Died: 10 February 2025 (aged 90) Belo Horizonte, Minas Gerais, Brazil
- Party: PFL
- Education: Federal University of Viçosa
- Occupation: Academic

Antônio Fagundes de Souza (12 August 1934 – 10 February 2025) was a Brazilian politician. A member of the Liberal Front Party, he served in the Legislative Assembly of Minas Gerais from 1987 to 1988.

He served as rector of the Federal University of Viçosa. De Souza died in Belo Horizonte on 10 February 2025, at the age of 90.
