= Peter Close =

English cricketer

Personal information
- Full name: Peter Alwen Close
- Born: 1 June 1943; Murree, Punjab Province, then India
- Died: 16 February 2025 (aged 81); Hawkhurst, Kent
- Batting: Right-handed
- Bowling: Right-arm off break

Domestic team information
- Years: Team
- 1964–1965: Cambridge University
- 1963–1966: Dorset

Career statistics
Competition	First-class
Matches	15
Runs scored	344
Batting average	13.76
100s/50s	–/1
Top score	54
Balls bowled	78
Wickets	1
Bowling average	44.00
5 wickets in innings	–
10 wickets in match	–
Best bowling	1/6
Catches/stumpings	14/–
- Source: Cricinfo, 5 September 2011

Peter Alwen Close (1 June 1943 – 16 February 2025) was an English cricketer. He was a right-handed batsman who bowled right-arm off break. He was born in Murree, Punjab Province, in the British Raj (today in Pakistan). He was educated at Haileybury and Imperial Service College in England.

While studying at Cambridge University, Close made his first-class debut for Cambridge University Cricket Club against Glamorgan in 1964. He made fourteen further first-class appearances for the university, the last of which came against Oxford University in 1965. In his fifteen first-class matches, he scored 344 runs at an average of 13.76, with a high score of 54. This score, which was his only first-class fifty, came against Glamorgan in 1965.

Close also played Minor counties cricket for Dorset, making his debut for the county in the 1963 Minor Counties Championship against Wiltshire. He played Minor counties cricket for Dorset from 1963 to 1966, making 29 Minor Counties Championship appearances.

He died at Hawkhurst, Kent on 16 February 2025.
