= Salih Saeed Ba-Amer =

Yemeni writer (1946–2025)

Salih Saeed Ba-Amer (Arabic: صالح سعيد باعامر; 1946 – February 2025) was a Yemeni short story writer. He was born in Hadhramaut province. His story Dancing by the Light of the Moon has been translated into English and was included in a 1988 anthology of modern Arabian literature (edited by Salma Khadra Jayyusi). Ba-Amer died in February 2025.
