= Kevin Webb (Australian rules football) =

Australian rules footballer (1928–2025)

Personal information
- Full name: Kevin Webb
- Born: 2 October 1928
- Died: 26 February 2025 (aged 96)
- Original team: Sunshine
- Height: 173 cm (5 ft 8 in)
- Weight: 67 kg (148 lb)

Playing career
Years	Club	Games (Goals)
1949	Richmond	7 (0)
1951	Melbourne	4 (4)
Total		11 (4)

Kevin Webb (2 October 1928 – 26 February 2025) was an Australian rules footballer who played with Richmond and Melbourne in the Victorian Football League (VFL).
