= Félix Cumbé =

Dominican–Haitian singer (1964–2025)

Félix Cumbé (born Critz Sterlin; 4 August 1964 – 11 February 2025) was a Haitian and Dominican singer of merengue and bachata.

== Life and career ==
Cumbé was born in Haiti on 4 August 1964. He migrated to the Dominican Republic when he was eight years old.

His musical debut took place in the 1980s with his single El Gatico written for Aníbal Bravo's orchestra. His popularity increased with the songs Feliz Cumbé and Déjame Volver, which he sang along with Fernando Villalona.

Cumbé left Aníbal Bravo's group and formed his own band, but it eventually broke up.

In 2012 he returned to show business with Tu no ta pa mi (Y yo aquí como un ma'icón).

Cumbé acquired Dominican Republic citizenship in 2021. He was married and had two children. Cumbé died from complications during heart surgery on 11 February 2025, at the age of 60.

== Discography ==
- Juanita la Cafetera (1987)
- Fiesta Party (1992)
- La Fugadora (1995)
- Eso Si Ta' Duro (1997)
- Bachateando (1999)
- Rompe Corazones (1999)
- El Inmigrante (2002)
- Eso Da Pa' To' (2002)
