= Anneke Scholtens =

Dutch writer (1955–2025)

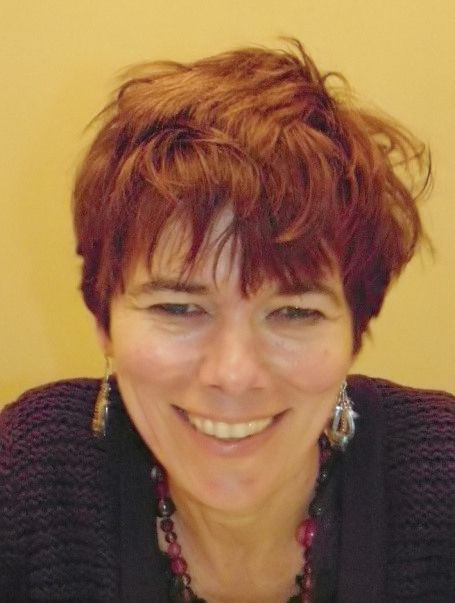
- Scholtens in 2010
- Born: 28 July 1955; Voorschoten, Netherlands
- Died: 11 February 2025 (aged 69); Amsterdam, Netherlands
- Occupation: writer

Anneke Scholtens (28 July 1955 – 11 February 2025) was a Dutch children's book writer. She wrote multiple books in the Fritzi series and wrote the books series Het geheim van (The secret of). She published her last book in 2024, Idris, slaaf van Rome (Idris, Slave of Rome).

Scholtens died in Amsterdam on 11 February 2025, at the age of 69 from a long illness.
