= Alfredo Letanú =

Argentine footballer (1952–2025)

Personal information
- Full name: Alfredo Raúl Letanú
- Date of birth: 12 August 1952
- Place of birth: Campana, Argentina
- Date of death: 5 February 2025 (aged 72)
- Place of death: Campana, Argentina
- Height: 1.80 m (5 ft 11 in)
- Position: Forward

Senior career*
Years	Team	Apps	(Gls)
1971	Villa Dálmine		
1972–1974	Boca Juniors	50	(8)
1975	Gimnasia de Mendoza	16	(8)
1976	Unión Española	13	(6)
1976–1977	Estudiantes	15	(9)
1978	Racing Club	13	(2)
1979	San Lorenzo	7	(1)
1980	Boca Juniors	9	(2)
1981	Villa Dálmine		
1982	Gimnasia de Mendoza	15	(7)
1982–1983	Cartagena	15	(4)
1983	Cambaceres	16	(2)
- * Club domestic league appearances and goals

Alfredo Raúl Letanú (12 August 1952 – 5 February 2025) was an Argentine professional footballer who played as a forward.

== Career ==
Letanú travelled to various clubs, scoring 10 goals with Boca Juniors, 38 with Estudiantes, and 14 with Gimnasia y Esgrima. In 1976, he played for Chilean club Unión Española and entered in six matches in the Copa Libertadores, scoring one goal. He played 15 matches in the Segunda División with Cartagena, scoring four goals.

Letanú ended his career with Defensores de Cambaceres in 1983, scoring two goals in 16 matches.

== Death ==
Letanú died in Campana on 5 February 2025, at the age of 72.
