= Giles Cokelet =

American chemical engineer

- Born: Giles Roy Cokelet; January 7, 1932; New York, U.S.
- Died: February 9, 2025 (aged 93); Bozeman, Montana, U.S.
- Education: Pasadena Community College; California Institute of Technology; Massachusetts Institute of Technology
- Occupation: Chemical engineer

Giles Roy Cokelet (January 7, 1932 – February 9, 2025) was an American chemical engineer.

== Life and career ==
Cokelet was born in New York, the son of Roy Cokelet and Anna Trippel. He was raised in Carle Place, New York, and he moved to California at an early age. He attended and graduated from Monrovia-Arcadia-Duarte High School. After graduating, he attended Pasadena Community College and the California Institute of Technology, earning his BS degree in 1957 and his MS degree in 1958. He also attended the Massachusetts Institute of Technology, earning his ScD degree in 1963.

Cokelet served as a professor in the department of chemical engineering at Montana State University. During his years as a professor, in 1970, he was named a fellow of the American Association for the Advancement of Science.

== Death ==
Cokelet died in Bozeman, Montana on February 9, 2025, at the age of 93.
