= Trevan Clough =

Papua New Guinean sports shooter

Personal information
- Born: 27 October 1942
- Died: 28 February 2025 (aged 82)
- Height: 179 cm (5 ft 10 in)
- Weight: 70 kg (154 lb)

Sport
- Sport: Sports shooting
- Event: Trap

Trevan Clough (27 October 1942 – 28 February 2025) was a Papua New Guinean former sports shooter. He competed at the 1976 Summer Olympics and 1984 Summer Olympics.

Clough died on 28 February 2025, at the age of 82.
