= Ilya Rosenblum =

Russian politician (1939–2025)

- Илья Розенблюм

Member of the Federation Council of Russia
- In office 16 February 2000 – 4 June 2001

Personal details
- Born: Ilya Semenovich Rosenblum; 30 January 1939 Leningrad, Russian SFSR, USSR
- Died: 6 February 2025 (aged 86)
- Education: Leningrad Mining Institute
- Occupation: Geologist

Ilya Semyonovich Rosenblum (Rozenblyum) (Russian: Илья Семёнович Розенблюм; 30 January 1939 – 6 February 2025) was a Russian politician. He served in the Federation Council from 2000 to 2001.

He was born in Leningrad but spent his entire adult life in the North, holding positions ranging from field party geological technician to General Director of JSC "Geometall." He holds a Candidate of Sciences degree in geology and mineralogy.

He was elected as a deputy of the second convocation of the Magadan Regional Duma. From February 2000 to June 2001, he served as the head of the legislative body and was a member of the Federation Council, where he worked on the Committee for Northern Affairs and Indigenous Peoples.

Rosenblum died on 6 February 2025, at the age of 86.
