= Grazia Zuffa =

Italian politician (1945–2025)

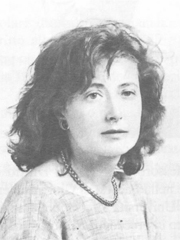

Member of the Senate of the Republic of Italy for Tuscany
- In office 2 July 1987 – 14 April 1994

Personal details
- Born: 8 August 1945; Piasco, Italy
- Died: 9 February 2025 (aged 79); Rome, Italy
- Political party: PCI (1987–1991); PDS (1991–1994)
- Occupation: Psychologist

Grazia Zuffa (8 August 1945 – 9 February 2025) was an Italian politician. A member of the Italian Communist Party and the Democratic Party of the Left, she served in the Senate of the Republic from 1987 to 1994.

Zuffa died in Rome on 9 February 2025, at the age of 79.
