= Bob Turner (footballer, born 1936) =

Australian rules footballer

Personal information
- Full name: Robert Stanley Turner
- Born: 21 June 1936
- Died: 1 February 2025 (aged 88)
- Original team: Traralgon
- Height: 183 cm (6 ft 0 in)
- Weight: 80 kg (176 lb)

Playing career^{1}
Years	Club	Games (Goals)
1957–58, 1960–61	Melbourne	22 (7)
- ^{1} Playing statistics correct to the end of 1961.

Bob Turner (21 June 1936 – 1 February 2025) was an Australian rules footballer who played with Melbourne in the Victorian Football League (VFL).
