= Joan Delaney Grossman =

American scholar (1928–2025)

Joan Delaney Grossman (December 12, 1928-February 2025) was an American professor, author, and scholar who travelled to Russia during the Cold War and wrote about Russian topics. She was a professor at University of California Berkeley.

She graduated from Visitation Academy in Dubuque and joined the Sisters of Charity of the Blessed Virgin Mary.

She graduated from Clarke College in Dubuque with a B.A. in English in 1952 and taught English at Immaculata High School in Chicago, Illinois from 1952 to 1957 and at Clarke College in Dubuque from 1957 to 1959. She studied Russian at Fordham University’s and Middlebury College’s summer schools and the graduate program at Columbia, earning an M.A. in Russian literature in 1962. She received a PhD in Slavic languages and Literatures in 1967 from Harvard.

She married Gregory Grossman who died in 2014. She wrote about her life on her blog.

She wrote a book about Edgar Allan Poe's time in Russia. She wrote a book about Ivan Konevskoi. She wrote an introductory essay for The Diary of Valery Bryusov, 1893-1905 published in 1980.

== Writings ==
=== Articles ===
- "Leadership of Antireligious Propaganda in the Soviet Union” Studies in Soviet Thought 12:3 (1972)
- “Khrushchev's Anti‐religious Policy and the Campaign of 1954” Soviet Studies 24:3 (1973)

=== Books ===
- Edgar Allan Poe in Russia: A study in Legend and Literary Influence Colloquium Slavicum (1973)
- Valery Bryusov and the Riddle of Russian Decadence University of California Press (1985)
- Creating Life: The Aesthetic Utopia of Russian Modernism, co-editor Stanford University Press (1994)
- William James in Russian Culture, co-edited with Ruth Rischin, Lexington Books (2003)
- Ivan Konevskoi: "Wise Child" of Russian Symbolism Academic Studies Press (2010)
