= Ryszard Stanibuła =

Polish politician (1950–2025)

Ryszard Zbigniew Stanibuła (24 October 1950 – 9 February 2025) was a Polish politician. Born in Rachanie, he was a member of the Polish People's Party. He earned a Veterinary Degree from the Agricultural Academy in Lublin in the year 1976. Stanibuła later studied Agricultural Law at University Carnio in France.

Stanibula began serving as a congressman in 1993, before taking a small break during 1997 and 1998. He is notable as the very active having received the most votes in any election since the death of Ryszard Bondyra. For example, during his Third term, Ryszard Stanibula spoke 250 times for his region. In the Second, Third and Fourth Sejm RP Stanibula represented the Lublin District. He was also a member of the National Fire Department Union.

Stanibuła died on 9 February 2025, at the age of 74.
