= K. K. S. Murthy =

Indian aero engineer and book seller

K. K. S. Murthy (1929 – 17 February 2025) was an Indian aeronautics engineer and a book seller. He was the second-generation proprietor of the Select Book Shop in Bengaluru.

== Early life ==
Murthy was brought up and lived in Bengaluru. He was the son of late K. B. K Rao, an advocate and a native of Kurnool in Andhra Pradesh who started a bookshop on the Museum Road in 1945. He worked as an engineer for 18 years at the Hindustan Aeronautics Limited, before taking over the family book business. His wife died in 2017. He did his aeronautical engineering at Indian Institute of Science, Bengaluru.

== Career ==
He was an aeronautics engineer and after his stint at HAL, he took over the running of the family bookshop, the Select Book store in 1984 and gave it a face-lift after moving it to its present location, off Brigade Road. In 2021, a documentary was made on him, titled, Ayda Pustaka which means, 'the selected book'. His son, K. Sanjay, is running the shop after his death. The Book Shop has a rare collection of over 9,000 books, including some from the 15th century. It is known for its rare second-hand books. Famous author and historian Ramachandra Guha is a regular visitor to the shop for over 40 years and playwright Girish Karnad was also among the many, who frequently visited the shop. Author Ruskin Bond mentioned the Book store in his book, Confessions of a book lover. “Mr Bond wrote a letter to tell me what he was doing,” Murthy was quoted saying by Deccan Chronicle.

=== Death ===
Murthy died of age-related ailments on 17 February 2025 in Bengaluru. He ran the Select Book Shop and used to greet the regulars daily till three months before his death. His last rites were performed on Tuesday, 18 February 2025.
