= Lawrence S. Cunningham =

American theologian (1935–2025)

- Born: September 23, 1935
- Died: February 20, 2025 (aged 89); South Bend, Indiana, U.S.
- Spouse: Cecilia Davis Cunningham
- Children: 2

Academic background
- Education: Saint Bernard's Seminary (BA); Pontifical Gregorian University (STL); Florida State University (MA, PhD)

Lawrence Springer Cunningham (September 23, 1935 – February 20, 2025) was an American scholar of Christian theology, author, and essayist. He was a prolific author and editor of some 25 books, including being the editor on the Christian section of The Norton Anthology of World Religions. He received his PhD in humanities at Florida State University where he served as a professor for 21 years. He also served as a professor at University of Notre Dame for 24 years before retiring in 2012. In May 2011, he received the Christus Magister Medal from the University of Portland. He also wrote book reviews as a literary columnist for Commonweal magazine. Cunningham died on February 20, 2025, in South Bend, Indiana.

== Selected bibliography ==
- Christian Spirituality: Themes from the Tradition. Paulist Press. 1996. ISBN 978-0-8091-3660-5.
- The Catholic Heritage. Wipf and Stock Publishers. March 1, 2002. ISBN 978-1-7252-0262-7.
- Francis of Assisi: Performing the Gospel of Life. Wm. B. Eerdmans Publishing. May 11, 2004. ISBN 978-0-8028-2762-3.
- An Introduction to Catholicism. Cambridge University Press. February 16, 2009. ISBN 978-1-139-47823-6.
- The Chapels of Notre Dame. University of Notre Dame Press. 2012. ISBN 978-0-268-03735-2.
- Norton Anthology of World Religions: Christianity. W. W. Norton & Company. February 18, 2015. ISBN 978-0-393-91899-1. (editor)
