= Yeshe Lodoi Rinpoche =

Tibetan lama and singer (1943–2025)

- ཡེ་ཤེས་བློ་གྲོས་རིན་པོ་ཆེ
- Born: 1943; Litang County, Tibet
- Died: 7 February 2025 (aged 81–82); Kathmandu, Nepal
- Education: Drepung Monastery; Central Institute of Higher Tibetan Studies
- Occupation(s): Lama; Singer

Yeshe Lodoi Rinpoche (Standard Tibetan: ཡེ་ཤེས་བློ་གྲོས་རིན་པོ་ཆེ; 1943 – 7 February 2025) was a Tibetan Buddhist lama and singer.

== Biography ==
Born in Litang County in 1943, Rinpoche joined a Gelug monastery at a young age. At the age of 13, he entered Drepung Monastery, where he stayed until the Tibetan exodus of 1959, settling in India. Until 1969, he took refuge at Buxa Fort, having been ordained by the 14th Dalai Lama in 1963. From 1969 to 1971, he lived in Dharamsala and worked as chief librarian of the Library of Tibetan Works and Archives. In 1972, he joined the Central Institute of Higher Tibetan Studies, where he obtained the degree of acharya. His main spiritual masters included the Dalai Lama, Ling Rinpoche, Trijang Lobsang Yeshe Tenzin Gyatso, and Khensur Ngawang Nyima Rinpoche. In 1979, he obtained the Geshe degree at Drepung Monastery.

In 1991, Rinpoche was sent to Mongolia to teach at Gandantegchinlen Monastery before sending him to Buryatia the following year. He briefly returned to Mongolia before working to restore the monastic system back in Buryatia. In December 1994, he consecrated several monasteries, including the Tamchinsky datsan. In 1997, he obtained Russian citizenship and moved to Ulan-Ude, the capital of Buryatia. In 2002, a documentary titled Join me in Shambhala, directed by Anya Bernstein, was dedicated to him. Thereafter, he was a full-time professor at Ivolginsky Datsan in Ulan-Ude. In May 2009, he recorded Tibetan chants alongside Russian pianist Anton Batagov. In 2018, he was invited by Erdne Ombadykow to Elista, the capital city of Kalmykia.

Yeshe Lodoi Rinpoche died at Swayambhunath in Kathmandu on 7 February 2025.
