= Jean-Claude Walter =

French poet (1940–2025)

- Born: 20 April 1940; Besançon, France
- Died: 10 February 2025 (aged 84)
- Education: University of Strasbourg
- Occupation: Poet

Jean-Claude Walter (20 April 1940 – 10 February 2025) was a French poet.

== Life and career ==
Walter was a graduate of the University of Strasbourg and wrote over a dozen works, several of which were translated into German, Italian, and English.

Walter died on 10 February 2025, at the age of 84.

== Publications ==
=== Poetry ===
- Le Sismographe appliqué (1966)
- Poèmes des bords du Rhin (1972)
- Paroles dans l’arbre (1974)
- Fragments du cri (1975)
- Récits du temps qui brûle (1976)
- Patience de la lumière (1978)
- L’amour parole (1986)
- Le Granit et la source (1987)
- Poèmes premiers (1988)
- L’Herbe sauvage (1992)
- Dialogues d’ombre (1996)
- Douze poèmes d’amour (2000)

=== Prose ===
- Le Rhin des poètes et des conteurs (1966)
- L’évêque musclé (1968)
- Léon-Paul Fargue ou l’homme en proie à la ville (1973)
- Que notre Alsace est belle (1983)
- Erwin Heyn, graveur et sculpteur (1998)
- Les étincelles noires. Une enfance alsacienne (2002)
- Chemins de ronde (2004)
- Carnets du jour et de la nuit (2010)
- Le Rhin, un voyage littéraire (2011)
- Dans l'œil du dragon (2015)
