= Susan DeFreitas =

American author (1977–2025)

- Born: Hart, Michigan
- Occupation: Author
- Notable work: Hot Season (2016)

Susan DeFreitas (May 19, 1977 - February 26, 2025) was an author who was born in Hart, Michigan to an American mother and a Guyanese father. DeFreitas held an MFA from Pacific University.

== Life and career ==
DeFreitas recounted growing up in Michigan while spending her summers in the Caribbean and South Florida. She stated that her ability as a storyteller stemmed from her experiences traveling -- and was influenced by her Guyanese grandparents as well as her maternal grandmother. Her fiction writing was also influenced by the Arizona high country, where she met and travelled with a caravan of circus performers.

DeFreitas held an MFA from Pacific University and resided in Portland, Oregon and Santa Fe, New Mexico. Her 2016 novel Hot Season won the 2017 Gold IPPY Award for Best Fiction of the Mountain West. In addition to writing DeFreitas also worked as a freelance editor and book coach, helping numerous writers actualize their projects. DeFreitas specialized in literary fiction, speculative fiction, poetry, and memoirs. She has been influenced by writers such as Ursula K. Le Guin, Toni Morrison, and Kelly Link. DeFreitas died from complications of cancer in on February 26, 2025.
