= Janice Moore Fuller =

American poet and playwright (1951–2025)

Janice Moore Fuller (November 23, 1951 – February 25, 2025) was an American poet and playwright, currently Writer-In-Residence and Professor of English at Catawba College, in Salisbury, NC. She is the author of three books of poetry and a number of plays (see bibliography). Fuller earned her B.A. at Duke University and her M.A. and Ph.D at the University of North Carolina at Greensboro. An outstanding instructor, she was a four-time winner of Catawba's Teacher of the Year Award; she also won the Swink Prize for Outstanding Classroom Teaching. She was Visiting Professor of English at Harlaxton College (the British campus of the University of Evansville) and a poetry workshop teacher at the Wildacres Writers Workshop.

Fuller died on February 25, 2025, at age 73.

== Bibliography ==
Poetry

- On the Bevel. Dorset, UK: Cinnamon P, 2014. ISBN 978-1909077263
- Seance. Knoxville, TN: Iris P, 2007. ISBN 978-0-916078-87-4
- Sex Education. Knoxville, TN: Iris P, 2004. ISBN 0-916078-60-4
- Archeology Is a Destructive Science. Carthage, NC: Scots Plaid P, 1998. ISBN 1-879009-34-X

Plays

- Dix, a full-length play. Produced at the Minneapolis Fringe Festival. August 2004.
- Church of the Spilled Blood, a one-act play. Produced at Bare Bones Theater’s New Play Festival, Charlotte, NC. May 2003.
- The Last Glass-Bottom Boat, a series of three short plays. Produced at Catawba College’s Florence Busby Corriher Theater, March 2003.
- Conjoined, a full-length one-act play. Staged reading at Catawba College’s Florence Busby Corriher Theater, November 2002.
