= Joseph Gitnig =

American street performer (1930–2025)

Joseph Leslie Gitnig (January 26, 1930 – February 23, 2025), also known as Pegasus, was an American street entertainer and poet. He was best known for his free performances for children in Central Park in New York City in the 1970s.

== Early life and education ==
Gitnig was born in Philadelphia in 1930. After high school, he studied at the Philadelphia Museum of School of Art and the Pennsylvania Academy of the Fine Arts.

In 1953, Gitnig moved to New York and took evening classes at the Jefferson School of Social Science. His poems were published in the Brooklyn Heights Press and San Francisco Progress.

== Career ==
Gitnig began street performances in 1962, assuming various costumes. In 1969, Gitnig sought unsuccessfully to see Mayor John V. Lindsay about getting paid for his work as a clown.

By 1971, he was known as Pegasus, and became a familiar sight at Central Park Zoo in his court jester costume and mismatched shoes. For a period in 1976, he complained about competition from newcomers Rosie and Herbert, whose bells and whistles distracted his audience from his relatively quiet pantomime act. His main income was from performing at private parties for children, as well as tips from street performances, from which he earned $3,000 a year.

In March 1977, Pegasus made national headlines after he returned to the seal pool at Central Park Zoo to perform, despite being arrested and issued with a police summons. He was charged with violating a New York Parks Department regulation, which had been interpreted as requiring licenses for performers in the city's parks, although no other performer had ever been similarly charged. He was arrested a second time in May 1977. Gitnig was represented by Arthur Eisenberg of the New York Civil Liberties Union, who argued that the First Amendment protected the rights of performers in the park as free speech. Later that year, the Parks Department reversed its position and agreed to drop all charges against Pegasus.

== Personal life and death ==
In 1982, Gitnig married Martine "Tineke" Bertrums, a flight attendant with KLM, and moved to the Netherlands two years later. His book with Roeline van Berchum, Unicorns in the Afternoon. Poetry of promise, was published in 2024. He died of kidney failure in Tilburg, on February 23, 2025, at the age of 95.
