= Thierry Rocher =

French playwright and actor (1959–2025)

- Born: 5 May 1959; Vichy, France
- Died: 2 February 2025 (aged 65)
- Occupation(s): Playwright, actor

Thierry Rocher (5 May 1959 – 2 February 2025) was a French playwright and actor.

== Life and career ==
Born in Vichy on 5 May 1959, Rocher started his career as a literary editor. In 2012, he appeared onstage in Le Candidat 2012 by Patrick Font. In 2022, he wrote the book La Mort passe. He also participated in the TV show La Revue de presse, broadcast on Paris Première. His presence on the show was satirical, pretending to be a serious expert on a wide variety of topics and ending his presentations by quoting a fictitious Chinese philosopher named Qi Shi Tsu. A collection of his presentations, titled Les pensées de Qi Shi Tsu, was published by Éditions Nems & Philosophie in 2017. His son, Lucas, became a singer.

Rocher died on 2 February 2025, at the age of 65.

== Plays ==
- À boire et à manger
- Boissons en sus
- Je vous attendais
- Meurtre entre célibataires
