= Andrzej Potocki (politician) =

Polish politician (1964–2025)

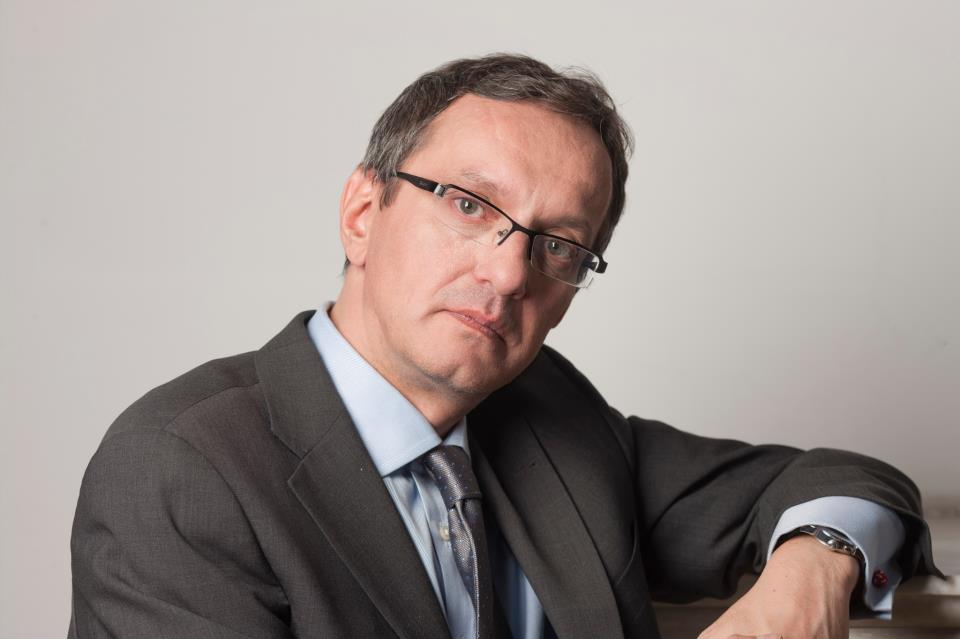
- Potocki in 2013

Member of the Sejm
- In office 25 November 1991 – 18 October 2001

Personal details
- Born: Andrzej Tadeusz Potocki; 25 August 1964; Gliwice, Poland
- Died: 16 February 2025 (aged 60)
- Political party: ROAD (1990–1991); UD (1991–1994); UW (1994–2005); PD (2005–2006); SD (2006–2025)
- Education: Catholic University of Lublin
- Occupation: Teacher

Andrzej Tadeusz Potocki (25 August 1964 – 16 February 2025) was a Polish politician. A member of multiple political parties, he served in the Sejm from 1991 to 2001.

Potocki died on 16 February 2025, at the age of 60.
