= Eurides Brito da Silva =

Brazilian politician (1937–2025)

Member of the Chamber of Deputies of Brazil for the Federal District
- In office 3 January 1991 – 31 January 1993

Member of the Legislative Chamber of the Federal District
- In office 1 February 1999 – 31 January 2007

Personal details
- Born: February 28, 1937 Capanema, Pará, Brazil
- Died: 3 February 2025 (aged 87) Brasília, Brazil
- Political party: PTR (1989–1993); PP (1993–1995); PPB (1995–1998); MDB (1998–2025)
- Education: Federal University of Pará
- Occupation: Academic

Eurides Brito da Silva (28 February 1937 – 3 February 2025) was a Brazilian politician. A member of multiple political parties, she served in the Chamber of Deputies from 1991 to 1993 and in the Legislative Chamber of the Federal District from 1999 to 2007.

Brito died in Brasília on 3 February 2025, at the age of 87.
