= Géraldine Faladé =

Writer and journalist (1935–2025)

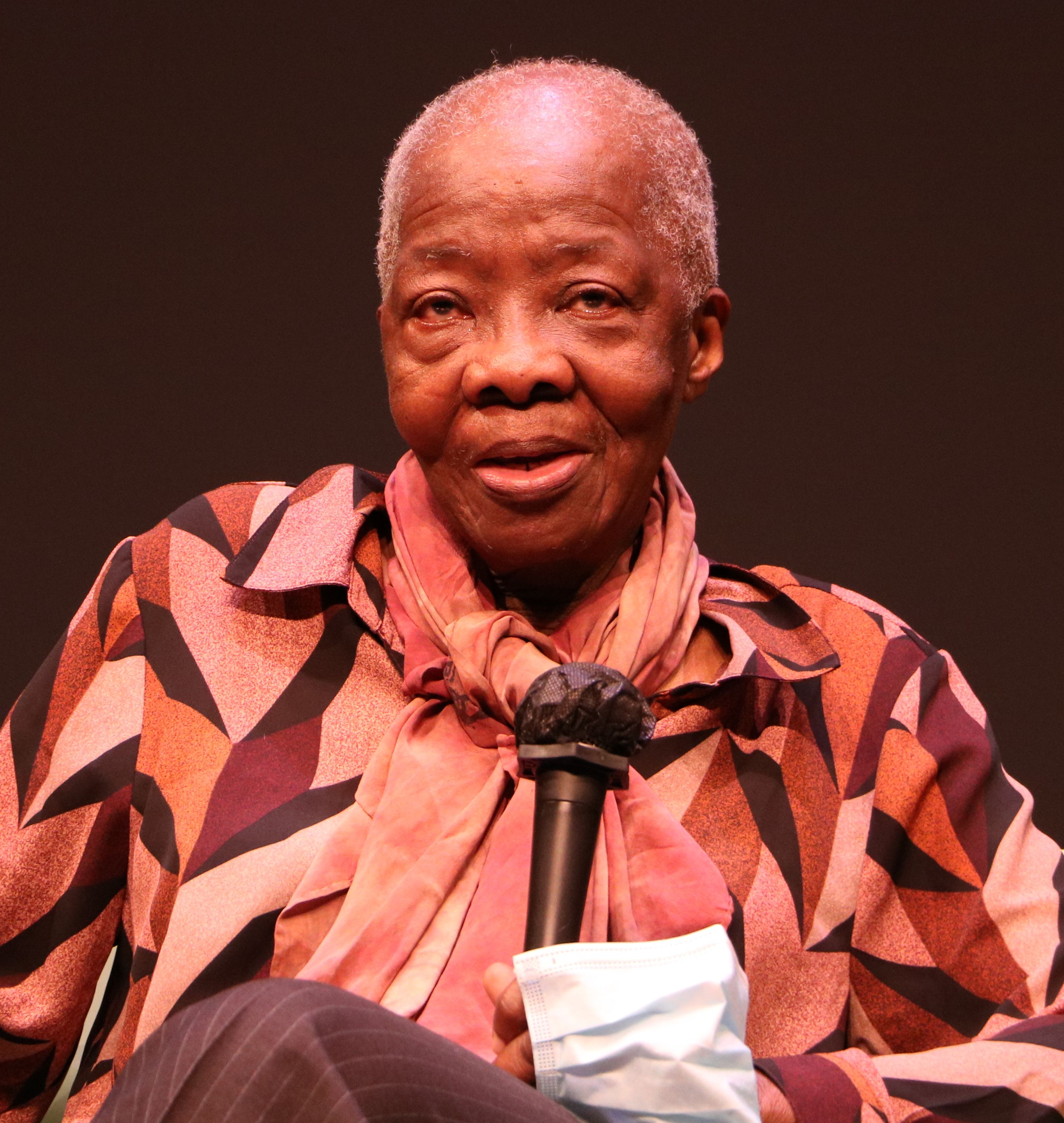
- Born: 1935; Porto-Novo, French Dahomey, French West Africa
- Died: 16 February 2025 (aged 90); France
- Education: Centre de formation des journalistes
- Occupations: Journalist, writer

Géraldine Faladé (1935 – 16 February 2025) was a Beninese-born French journalist and writer who was an employee at Ocora Radio France, the predecessor of Radio France Internationale. She contributed to the development of the press in Chad during her career within the country's Ministry of Information.

Faladé is also known for her essay Turbulentes! : African Women Ahead of Their Time, in which she highlights seventeen African women forgotten by history.

== Biography ==
=== Background ===
Géraldine Faladé Touadé was born in Porto-Novo in 1935. A descendant of King Behanzin of Dahomey, she had a maternal grandmother of Brazilian origin. She grew up in an intellectual and activist family. Her father Maximilen Faladé was an erudite man, a civil servant critical of colonization who participated in the founding of the newspaper La Voix du Dahomey. Her sister, Solange, was one of the first African psychoanalysts and for a time headed the association Fédération des étudiants d’Afrique noire en France.

She graduated from the Centre de formation des journalistes on rue du Louvre in Paris.

=== Career ===
External videos
- Turbulentes! by Géraldine Faladé Touadé Oct 3, 2020 TV5Monde Info

Géraldine Faladé is associated with the creation of the information and culture magazine La Vie africaine, which evolved in 1965 into the title L’Afrique actuelle.

During her career as a journalist, she covered important events, including the assassination of Patrice Lumumba and the massacre of Algerians in Paris in 1961. She worked at the Office de Coopération Radiophonique (Ocora). Faladé contributed to the development of the press in Chad during her career within the country's Ministry of Information.

She was also the author of a collection of tales, Regards et paroles du soir, collected on the advice of her sister, the pediatrician and psychoanalyst Solange Faladé, and an essay, Turbulentes in which she features the portraits of seventeen African women.

=== Death ===
Faladé died in France on 16 February 2025, at the age of 90.
