= John Long (computer scientist) =

British computer scientist (1935–2025)

John Brian Long (3 December 1935 – 13 February 2025) was a British computer scientist and Emeritus Professor of Cognitive Engineering at UCL, known for his work on cognitive ergonomics and human-computer interaction.

== Life and career ==
Long obtained his BA in Modern Languages from Cambridge University in 1959, his BSc in psychology from Hull University in 1970, and his PhD in Cognitive Engineering from Cambridge University in 1978 with the thesis entitled "Multidimensional Signal Recognition: Reduced Efficiency and Process Interaction," under supervision of Donald Broadbent. In 2001 he obtained his D.Eng from the University of London.

Long started his academic career as Reader at UCL in 1979, and was later appointed Professor of Cognitive Ergonomics. He chaired its Ergonomics and HCI Unit, and was Director of Studies for both their MSc and PhD programmes, and in 2001 he became Emeritus Professor of Cognitive Engineering. He was Concurrent Professor at the Northeast Forestry University in Harbin, China from 1989, and Visiting Professor at the Swinburne University of Technology in Melbourne in 1997, at the Eindhoven University of Technology from 1998-2000, and at the Universiti Malaysia Sarawak in 2000.

Long is recognised as one of the founders of the field of human-computer interaction in the UK. In 2010 the journal Interacting with Computers published a special Issue, Festschrift for John Long.

Long died in 2025, at the age of 89.

== Selected publications ==
- J. Long, A. Baddeley (Eds.), Attention and performance IX, Proceedings of the Ninth International Symposium on Attention and Performance, Jesus college, Cambridge, England, July 13–18, 1980 Erlbaum, Hillsdale, NJ (1980).
- Long, John, and Andy Whitefield, eds. Cognitive ergonomics and human-computer interaction. Vol. 1. Cambridge University Press, 1989.
- Lim, Kee Yong, and John B. Long. The MUSE method for usability engineering. Vol. 8. Cambridge University Press, 2009.

Articles, a selection:

- Dowell, John; Long, John (1989). "Towards a conception for an engineering discipline of human factors" (PDF). Ergonomics. 32 (11): 1513–1535. doi:10.1080/00140138908966921. PMID 28080937.
- Long, John (1996). "Specifying relations between research and the design of human-computer interactions". International Journal of Human-Computer Studies. 44 (6): 875–920. doi:10.1006/ijhc.1996.0037.
