= Enrique Valdivieso =

Spanish historian (1943–2025)

Enrique Valdivieso González (1943 – 2 February 2025) was a Spanish art historian. He held the position of professor of Art History at the University of Seville. Valdivieso specialised in the Sevillian school of painting. He died from smoke inhalation on 2 February 2025, at the age of 81.
