= Xiaoyu Luo =

Chinese and British applied mathematician

Xiaoyu Luo (Chinese: 罗小玉, 1960 – 5 February 2025) was a Chinese and British applied mathematician who studied biomechanics, fluid dynamics, and the interactions of fluid flows with soft biological tissues. She was a professor of applied mathematics at the University of Glasgow.

== Education and career ==
Luo was born in the UK but grew up in Xi'an in a family of artists. After earning bachelor's and master's degrees in theoretical mechanics at Xi'an Jiaotong University, in 1982 and 1985 respectively, she became a lecturer at Xi'an Jiaotong University. There, she studied for a Ph.D. from 1987 until 1990, with a visit to the UK through a joint doctoral program with the University of Sheffield. When she earned her Ph.D. at Xi'an Jiaotong University in 1990, she became the first woman to do so. She moved to the UK in 1992 to become a postdoctoral researcher at the University of Leeds. She worked as a lecturer in engineering at Queen Mary and Westfield College from 1997 to 2000, and in mechanical engineering at the University of Sheffield from 2000 to 2004, before becoming a senior lecturer in mathematics at the University of Glasgow in 2005. She was promoted to professor in 2008, the first female professor of applied mathematics at Glasgow. In 2014 she was named a chair professor at Northwestern Polytechnical University in Xi'an. She has also been a visitor to the International Center for Applied Mechanics at Xi'an Jiaotong University.

== Death ==
Luo died on 5 February 2025 at Queen Elizabeth University Hospital in Glasgow, aged 64.

== Recognition ==
Luo became a Fellow of the Institution of Mechanical Engineers in 2004 and a Fellow of the Royal Society of Edinburgh in 2014.
