= Jan Drenth =

Dutch chemist (1925–2025)

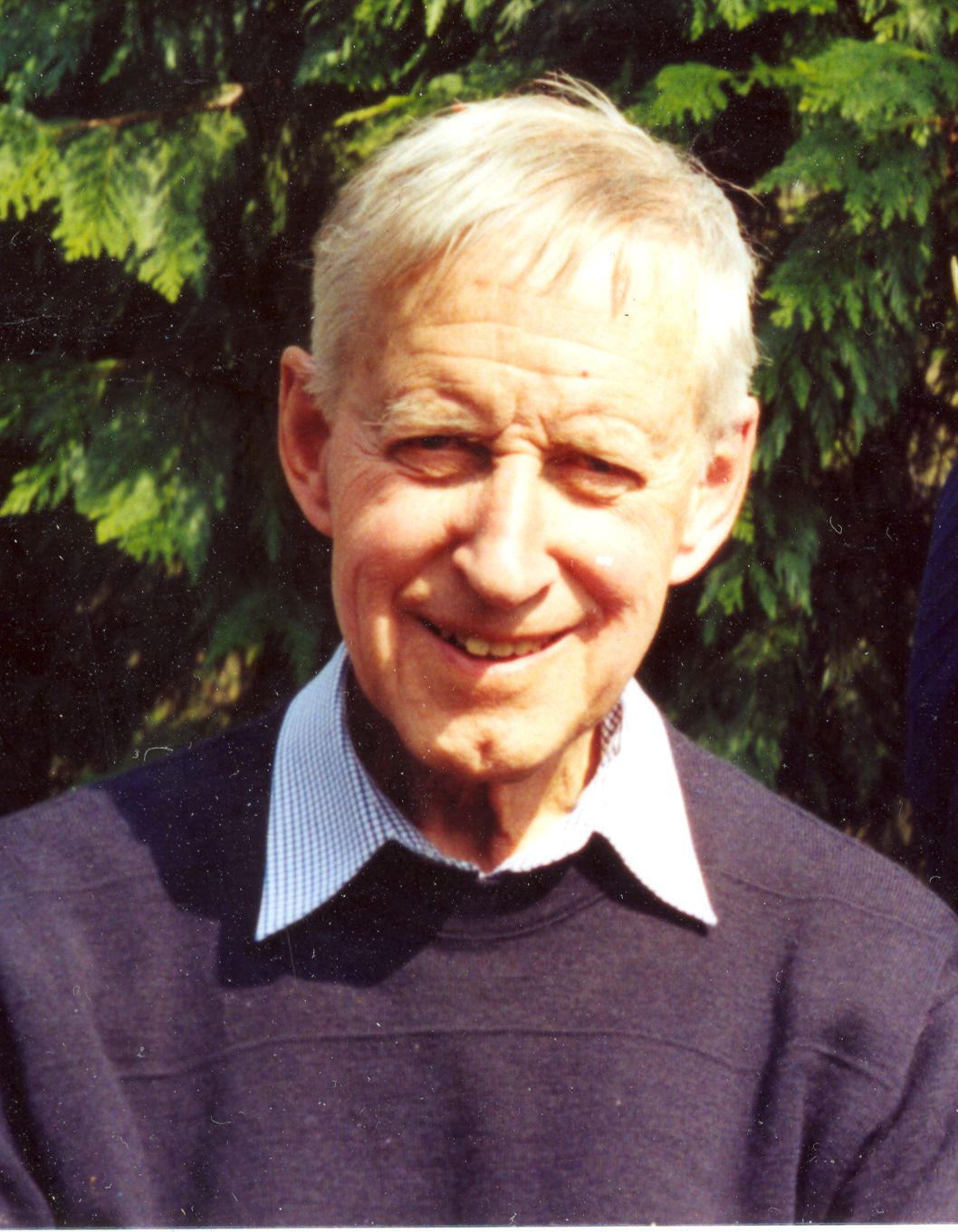
Jan Drenth between 1992 and 2005

Jan Drenth (20 February 1925 – 11 February 2025) was a Dutch chemist. He was a professor of structural chemistry at the University of Groningen from 1969 to 1990.

== Life and career ==
Drenth was born in Groningen on 20 February 1925. He obtained his PhD in mathematics and physics under Eelco Wiebenga at the University of Groningen in 1957, with a dissertation titled: Een röntgenografisch onderzoek van excelsine, edestine en tabakszaadglobuline. Drenth subsequently moved to New York, United States, where he became a post-doc and studied protein crystallography under Barbara Low. Drenth then returned to the Netherlands and in 1967 was appointed lector. In 1969 he was appointed professor of structural chemistry, which he remained until his retirement in 1990.

Drenth was elected a member of the Royal Netherlands Academy of Arts and Sciences in 1973.

Drenth died on 11 February 2025, at the age of 99.

== Works ==
- Principles of Protein X-Ray Crystallography.
