= Sisira Jayasuriya =

Sri Lankan academic

- Born: 22 June 1946; Bandaragama, Sri Lanka
- Died: 18 February 2025 (aged 78); Melbourne, Australia
- Occupation: academic
- Spouse: Sreeni
- Children: Tanya

Sisira Jayasuriya, was a professor of economics at Monash University, Melbourne, Australia. His research and policy advisory activities cover trade, macroeconomic, environmental and food policy issues in developing countries, with a focus on Asia. He has published widely on natural disaster, food security and food safety issues, trade and WTO rules, foreign investment, soil erosion and environmental problems, macroeconomic and exchange rate policies in Sri Lanka and tsunami reconstruction.

He is also an internationally known scholar of the political economy of developing countries and has published several widely cited scholarly articles on the Sri Lankan conflict in journals such as World Development, Oxford Development Studies and the Economic and Political Weekly.

Professor Jayasuriya was ethnically Sinhalese from Sri Lanka. In January 2009, he was interviewed by the Australian Broadcasting Corporation on the ongoing Sri Lankan Civil War.

== See also ==
- Sri Lankan Civil War
- La Trobe University
