= Hugues Oyarzabal =

French surfer

Hugues Oyarzabal (7 March 1985 – 21 February 2025) was a French surfer. He was best known for making video recordings while surfing. He surfed extensively in his native Basque Country and in Indonesia. He had bipolar disorder since he was a child and died by suicide at age 39.
