= Paul Wright =

Paul Wright may refer to:

== Sports ==
- Paul Wright (footballer) (born 1967), Scottish footballer
- Paul Wright (soccer) (born 1969), English/American soccer player
- Paul Wright (English cyclist) (born 1973), English professional racing cyclist
- Paul Wright (New Zealand cyclist) (born 1998)

== Musicians ==
- Paul Leddington Wright, organist of Coventry Cathedral and choral conductor
- Paul Wright, guitarist for the English goth rock band Fields of the Nephilim
- Paul Wright (singer) (born 1979), American Christian singer and musician

== Others ==
- Paul Wright (diplomat) (1915–2005), British diplomat, ambassador to Congo and to Lebanon
- Paul Wright (sub-dean of the Chapel Royal) (born 1966), English military and royal chaplain
- Paul Wright (archdeacon of Bromley & Bexley) (born 1954)
- Paul K. Wright (born 1947), English/American mechanical engineer
- Paul J. Wright (born 1955), California attorney and English barrister
- Paul S. Wright (born 1946), British professor
- Paul Elbridge Wright (1931–2017), American mechanical engineer, business executive
- Paul Wright (fairground artist) (1954-2019), British fairground and airbrush artist

== See also ==
- Paul Wight, wrestler, known as the Big Show
