= Norman Turnbull (songwriter) =

English songwriter

Norman Turnbull (1879 – 1954) was born in Tyneside and lived for a good part of his life in Gosforth, Newcastle with his four west Highland terriers peter, John, phylis and brown teeth.

He worked as a shipping clerk/surveyor in Grey Street, Newcastle. He wrote dialect songs as a hobby and was like Leonard Barras and Jack Robson in providing a rich source of materials for the local BBC Radio show "Wot Cheor Geordie" and working on the show with performers such as Bobby Thompson, Northumberland Serenaders, the Willie Walker Band and The Five Smith Brothers.

His songs include "What Cheor Geordie", "The Pitman's Lament", "Alang the Roman Wall", "Amble Feast", "The Barn Dance Hustle".

== See also ==
- Geordie dialect words
- Bobby Thompson
- Jack Robson
- Wot Cheor Geordie
