= Jack Lemmon – A Twist of Lemmon =

- Directed by: Annett Wolf
- Written by: Annett Wolf
- Starring: Jack Lemmon; Walter Matthau; Billy Wilder
- Cinematography: Donald H. Stern
- Edited by: William H. White
- Production companies: DR (broadcaster); Don Stern Productions
- Release date: 1976
- Running time: 59 minutes
- Countries: Denmark; United States
- Language: English

Jack Lemmon – A Twist of Lemmon is a 1976 Danish documentary television film directed by Annett Wolf, about the American actor Jack Lemmon. The film won the 1976 Billedbladets Gyldne Rose. It was the first film directed by Annett Wolf in Hollywood.

== Synopsis ==
In the setting of his office, Jack Lemmon shares some memories of his childhood and his relationship with his father that led him to develop a certain sense of humour and, ultimately, to become a professional entertainer. Lemmon expresses his personal mantra about film acting (“Simple is good”), and discusses some of his most important parts in Some Like It Hot and Days of Wine and Roses. The film also contains original interviews with Walter Matthau and Billy Wilder, and film clips from The Odd Couple (1968), Kotch (1971) (Lemmon's first directorial effort), The Front Page (1974) and the 1976 TV adaptation of The Entertainer.

== Production ==
In 1976, Wolf decided to take a one-year leave of absence from Danmarks Radio and went to Hollywood. With the crew of Don Stern productions, she shot Jack Lemmon – A Twist of Lemmon, followed by The World of Alfred Hitchcock, Walter Matthau and Telly Savalas alias Theo Kojak. That same year came Hurray for Hollywood, a three-part series on Hollywood and the American film industry featuring Robert Evans, John Schlesinger, Dustin Hoffman John Cassavetes, Steven Spielberg, Michael Schultz, John Frankenheimer, Norman Jewison, Richard Zanuck and David Brown. All these films were finally produced in cooperation with DR.

In 1982, Wolf filmed Jack Lemmon again, while she was shooting the behind the scenes material of Missing for Universal.

== Release ==
The film first premiered in 1976.

== See also ==
- Cinema of Denmark
