= Scott Dobson =

English art teacher, art critic and writer

Scott Dobson (26 December 1918 – 22 January 1986) was an English art teacher, art critic and writer. His works were influential in North East England.

== Life ==
He was born Edward Scott Dobson on 26 December 1918 in Blyth, Northumberland, the only child of a local government officer and a teacher. Very soon after his birth, the family moved to Newcastle upon Tyne where Scott attended Rutherford School. He excelled in art and won junior competitions. He studied art at King Edward VII College in Newcastle, at Freckleton and at Leeds College of Art.

After joining the Territorial Army, Dobson served in the army in France and India during the Second World War. After being demobilised he trained as a teacher, teaching art at a number of schools including Manchester Grammar School and St Aloysius in Newcastle upon Tyne. His painting followed a number of different paths including abstract art. He was also involved with two art galleries in Newcastle in the 1960s - the Westgate Gallery and then the Side Gallery - the latter with the photographer Jim Perry, who died in March 2012.

In the 1960s and 1970s, after moving out of teaching, he published his first Geordie dialect book, Larn Yersel Geordie, which became the definitive work on the dialect. This was followed up by several more books in the series. They were definitely not "politically correct" but yet full of wit and humour.

His materials were also much used (together with songs from Eric Boswell) on the BBC's Geordierama, a radio programme and later an annual stage show as part of the Newcastle Festival, which presented songs and sketches mainly in dialect and featured Mike Neville, George House and guests including Bobby "The Little Waster" Thompson and Dick Irwin.

Dobson semi-retired to the Maltese island of Gozo, where he died on 22 January 1986 and is buried in the cemetery. His headstone is inscribed "Gan Canny".

== Selected works ==
These include:

- Larn Yersel Geordie (1969)
- Hist'ry o' the Geordies (1970)
- Advanced Geordie Palaver (1970)
- Hadrian and the Geordie Waall
- Stotty Cake Row (1971)
- Supergeordie (1971)
- Aald Geordie's Almanack (1972)
- Geordie at the Match (with Len Shackleton)
- A light hearted guide to Geordieland (Newcastle, 1973)
- New Geordie Dictionary (Newcastle, 1974)
- The Geordie Joke Book (with Dick Irwin) (1970)
- The Blackpool Book (Newcastle, 1971)
- The Geordie Bible (Newcastle, 1986)

== See also ==
- Geordie dialect words
