= Graeme Danby =

English opera singer

Graeme Danby (born 23 May 1962 in Consett, County Durham, England) is an operatic bass who has performed at several of the world's leading opera houses, notably the Royal Opera House, Covent Garden and the English National Opera. He was educated at the Royal Academy of Music in London.

== English National Opera ==
In 2003, he sang the role of Lorenzo (I Capuletti ed I Montecchi) conducted by Richard Bonynge. This appearance was one among many in major roles for English National Opera, which include Don Basilio in Rossini's Il Barbiere di Siviglia; Dulcamara in Donizetti's L'elisir d'amore; Somnus in Handel's Semele; Quince in Britten's A Midsummer Night's Dream; Collatinus in Britten's The Rape of Lucretia, Poo-Bah in Gilbert & Sullivan's The Mikado; Sarastro in Mozart's Die Zauberflöte; Bartolo (Le nozze di Figaro); Sacristan in Puccini's Tosca; Pistol in Verdi's Falstaff and Ribbing in Verdi's Un ballo in maschera.

== Royal Opera House Covent Garden ==
Graeme Danby performs regularly at the Royal Opera House, Covent Garden. In Spring 2005, he sang the major role of Charrington in Lorin Maazel's Covent Garden commission of 1984, a part written especially for him. In 2006, he sang the role of Sacristano in Covent Garden's production of Tosca, alongside Angela Gheorghiu, Marcello Alvarez and Bryn Terfel. In 2007, he took the role of Gonzalo in Thomas Adès' The Tempest. Further roles include the Marquis d'Obigny (La traviata), Billy Jackrabbit (La fanciulla del West) and Second Armed Man (Die Zauberflöte).

== Career in Britain ==
British engagements also include Bartolo in Mozart's Le nozze di Figaro for Opera North and Garsington Opera; Collatinus in Britten's Rape of Lucretia at Buxton Festival; and Sacristan (Tosca), Bosun (Billy Budd), Benedict (La Vie parisienne) and Masetto (Don Giovanni) for Scottish Opera.

In the 2002–2003 season, Danby made his Glyndebourne debut as Antonio (Le nozze di Figaro), subsequently recording the role for Chandos Records.

Between 2005 and 2009 Danby and Valerie Reid recorded various songs by Tyneside folk composer Eric Boswell including his most famous Little Donkey and several humorous Geordie ballads written by Boswell on subjects suggested by Danby.

In 2012, Danby recorded a new version of "Blaydon Races", commissioned by BBC Newcastle.

== Career in Europe ==
European engagements include Brag in Purcell's The Fairy-Queen at the Gran Teatro del Liceu Barcelona; Somnos (Semele) and Bartolo (Le nozze di Figaro) with De Vlaamse Opera; and Xuthus in Pam Vir's Ion for the Opéra national du Rhin in Strasbourg. He sang at La Scala Milan as Snug in Britten's A Midsummer Night's Dream.

== Notable roles ==
- Bartolo - Le nozze di Figaro
- Somnos - Semele
- Collatinus - The Rape of Lucretia
