= Emma Ferreira =

British sculptor, photographer and entrepreneur

- Emma Ferreira walking down the red carpet at the BritWeek Event 2012.
- Born: 14 December 1975 (age 50); Buckinghamshire, England, UK
- Education: Otis College of Art and Design, Santa Monica College
- Known for: Photography, Mixed media, painting
- Movement: The Reality of my Illusion (TROMI)

Emma Ferreira (born 14 December 1975) is an English contemporary artist, sculptor, photographer, entrepreneur and philanthropist. She lives and works in Los Angeles and maintains a studio in Culver City, California.

Her work has been exhibited in galleries in London, Los Angeles, New York, Toronto and Barcelona and is characterized by an expressive application of color, as well as rich textures and movement.

To date, Ferreira has participated in 40 exhibitions, has had her work sold at Christie's Auction House in Beverly Hills, exhibited during the 55th Biennale in Venice, Italy and has been featured in publications such as BlackBook, Fabrik Magazine, The Malibu Times, h Magazine, Luxe Interiors + Design, InStyle, Haute Living, In Touch Weekly and Esquire. She was also art chair of BritWeek from 2009 to 2010 and maintains active involvement in the event.

Emma was named among the top 100 Inspirational women from Buckinghamshire alongside Amal Clooney, Kate Winslet and Queen Elizabeth by Berkshire and Buckinghamshire Life today Magazine in 2015.

Enter Eden; Apple G4 cube redesigned, part of TROMI collection

The sculpture titled Enter Eden; it is homage to Apple Inc. and its founder, Steve Jobs.

Ferreira is the founder of the brand TROMI (The Reality of my Illusion), Concept House Inc, The Concept Box and The Concept Collection.

== Personal life ==
Born in Buckinghamshire, England, Ferreira grew up as an only child. Her mother is English and her father is of half-Indian, half-Caribbean descent. At a very early age Ferreira decided that she wanted to experience life outside her rural surroundings, this decision led her to later drop out of art school and succumb to her desire to travel.

In an interview with Ann Tsang, owner of publishing company, The Antithesis Collective, Ferreira states that whilst she believes education to be invaluable, she considers travelling as "the best form of education a person can have." Moreover, Ferreira credits her journey as a traveller as the "force behind [the] creativity and the visions that inspire her work."

Ferreira has been living in Los Angeles since 1998. She received formal training at Beaconsfield, Buckinghamshire, Otis College of Art and Design and studied photography at Santa Monica College. It was this course in photography that sparked Ferreira's interest in the medium once more.

== Career and work ==
Through her use of mixed media such as acrylics, metallic paints, resins and mementos from her personal archives, Ferreira has successfully seized critics and collectors' attention in a relatively short amount of time. In an interview with Fabrik, Ferreira notes her desire to capture energy as the impetus for her artwork and attributes her awareness of this human energy to her success. Her work has been purchased by numerous corporations and has procured a substantial private and celebrity list of collectors that includes musicians, film stars and producers.

Ferreira's first photographic art show in Los Angeles took place at the Terrell Moore Gallery and was edited by noted photographer Bob Richardson, father of Terry Richardson.

=== TROMI (The Reality of my Illusion) ===
TROMI is Ferreira's most recent installation, the term, which stands for "The Reality of my Illusion", has also become the artist's brand. The ethos surrounding her latest work, as stated by Ferreira, is the notion that our dreams can effectively be transformed into a reality granted we take advantage of the circumstances at our disposal; these circumstances, as she delineates them, are freedom, choice and desire. In much the same vein as existentialism, TROMI, as a philosophy, addresses our personal freedom above all and highlights our responsibility to give life meaning and carry out our desires with the utmost passion.

Ferreira has translated this concept artistically through her marriage of mixed media and photography. By way of a unique method of printing photographs onto materials such as acrylic-plexi or glass and through another process of layering translucent panels, in a way that allows the subject to be suspended and viewed from both sides, Ferreira produces an aesthetic that has been described as light and possessing a dream-like quality. The technical process employed in the TROMI art series is called "Layerism" and "Translayerism", both words which the artist has coined.

=== Layerism and Translayerism ===
Layerism encompasses most of Ferreira's artistic work. It refers to a technique of layering various mediums such as flat or textured sheets of paper containing words, phrases, and/or images. The materials are layered on top of one another to create an effect that marks the composite space between what Ferreira deems as precision and spontaneity. However, Layerism is not limited to any specific medium; any item that can be layered on top of each other to create a composition can create a layerism style.

Translayerism marks the synthesis of translucency and Layerism. Whilst encompassing the style and technique of Layerism, Translayerism differs subtly with the additional element of transparency. This juxtaposition allows for space and the free movement of both light and energy within it.

Layering has become a metaphor to life for Ferreira. The artist believes that just as her work is composed of numerous layers so too is our existence. Moreover, the addition of transparent and translucent elements symbolises the space between those very same layers of our life. Incidentally, Ferreira refers to herself as both a layerist and a translayerist.

=== Kiss of the Gypsy ===
Photograph from Kiss of the Gypsy

Kiss of the Gypsy, the title Ferreira has given to her current project, is a coffee table book, and a worldwide art show, featuring photographic images shot in hotel rooms from around the world. The name of the book is taken from the eponymous myth that tells the story of how a single kiss from a gypsy has the power to change the recipient's perception. The extent of this transformation, however, depends upon the individual's willingness to believe in the power of the kiss.

The book's artistic elements follow the same premise as Ferreira's TROMI installation. Kiss of the Gypsy examines the artist's notion that exploration is the key to living and that freedom, desire and intention all play a vital role. The photographs in this collection are shot by Ferreira and feature the artist as subject; the images are executed through a style that she has developed herself wherein motion is added by simultaneously having the camera and the subject move physically.

=== Selected collectors ===
- Manny Pacquiao
- Justin Timberlake
- Jeremy Piven
- LeAnn Rimes
- Jason Statham
- Kerry Simon
- Dennis Hopper
- Shaun Toub
- Robert Downey Jr.
- Amy Adams
- Will Ward
- The Maloof Brothers

=== Selected corporate collectors ===
- The Cosmopolitan of Las Vegas
- Palms Casino Resort
- Ritz-Carlton, Atlanta, GA
- Monarchy Clothing Co.
- Fotinos Brothers Winery, Napa Valley, CA
- NBC, CA
- Sashi Lounge, Manhattan, CA
- Korbel Media Co., Beverly Hills, CA
- Moon Tide Media Co., CA
- The Harris Corporation, CA
- Micato Safaris, NY
- Nickelodeon, CA
- 20th Century Fox, CA
- Alchemy Spa, CA
- W Hotel, West Hollywood, CA
- Heineken, NY

=== Solo exhibitions ===
- 2015 The Biennale, Danieli, Venice, Italy
- 2013 Sparta Gallery, Hollywood, CA
- 2013 The Biennale, Danieli, Venice, Italy
- 2011 Factory Loft, Los Angeles, CA
- 2011 Sunset and Vine Hollywood, CA
- 2010 Frank Picture Gallery, Bergamot Station, Santa Monica, CA
- 2010 Chryssanthou Gallery, West Hollywood, CA
- 2009 Frank Picture Gallery Bergamot Station, Santa Monica, CA, "Exposed”
- 2009 Ferreira Gallery, DCCT.org Fundraiser, Culver City, CA
- 2009 Heck Art Studio's Featured Artist, BritWeek, Beverly Hills, CA, "Retrospective”
- 2009 Agora Gallery, Culver City Art Walk, Culver City, CA
- 2009 Ferreira Gallery, MOPOED Fundraiser, Culver City CA
- 2008 Tribeca Cinemas Gallery, New York, NY
- 2008 Watt Don Chaing Chaing Mai, Thailand, "Our Children"
- 2008 Malibu Living, Malibu, CA, "Mixed Media"
- 2008 Maison Luxe, Manhattan Beach, CA, "Ferreira Presents"
- 2008 Ferreira Gallery, Culver City, CA, "LSDAD"
- 2007 Spin Gallery, Venice, CA, "Classic Beauty"
- 2007 Ferreira Gallery, Culver City, CA, "When Life Dances"
- 2007 Gladstone Gallery, Toronto, Canada, "Fever"

=== Selected group exhibitions ===
- 2010 BritWeek Art Show, CA
- 2009 META, Hollywood, CA
- 2009 C2 Gallery, Venice, CA
- 2009 Venice Art Walk, Venice, CA
- 2009 Works sold at auction, Christie's, Beverly Hills, CA
- 2008 Gensler Architecture, Santa Monica, CA
- 2008 Venice Art Walk, Venice, CA
- 2008 Divine Design Showcase, Beverly Hills, CA
- 2008 DCCT.org Art showcase Beverly Wilshire Hotel Beverly Hills, CA
- 2008 Works sold at Auction, Christie's, Beverly Hills, CA
- 2008 Deborah Page Gallery, Santa Monica, CA
- 2008 Operation Smile Gala, Malibu, CA
- 2007 Greystone mansion, House and Garden Tour, Beverly Hills, CA
- 2007 Farmani Gallery, LA Painting, Beverly Hills, CA
- 2007 The Venice Contemporary, Venice, CA
- 2006 The Venice Lounge, Venice, CA, "Reflection"
- 2005 The Moore Gallery, Inglewood, CA, "Seven"
- 2005 The Red House Gallery, Venice, CA
- 2005 5th and Sunset, Los Angeles, CA,
- 2005 The Moore Gallery, Inglewood, CA, "Bear"

== Philanthropic work ==
Ferreira's travels revealed to her the suffering endured by the citizens of the countries she visited; these experiences, in turn, have fuelled and motivated her philanthropic work and her artistic celebration of the human body. She is an adherent of many causes overseas and at home and is an advocate for charities that benefit children in particular. Currently, Ferreira is on the board of Dreams Can Come True and Shakti Pictures.

=== Charities ===
- Project Angel Food
- Hollywood HEART
- MOPOED
- Dreams Can Come True
- The Art of Elysium
- Operation Smile
- Venice Family Clinic
- Love Our Children USA
- America's Second Harvest
- Malaria No More
- Los Angeles Best
- Fed Up Girl
- Shakti Pictures
