= Eric Boswell (songwriter) =

English songwriter (1921–2009)

- Eric Boswell
- Born: Eric Simpson; 18 July 1921; Millfield, Sunderland, England
- Died: 29 November 2009 (aged 88); Hexham, Northumberland, England
- Occupation: Songwriter

Eric Boswell (born Eric Simpson, 18 July 1921 – 29 November 2009) was an English composer of popular songs and folk music, most famous for writing the children's Christmas song "Little Donkey".

== Early life ==
Eric Boswell was born in Millfield, Sunderland, England, son of a tailor and a seamstress. He studied piano from age seven and later organ under Clifford Hartley, organist of Bishopwearmouth Church (now Sunderland Minster). After degrees in Electrical Engineering from Sunderland Technical College and Physics from Birkbeck College, London, Boswell joined Marconi as a scientist working with radar before becoming a Physics lecturer. Meanwhile, he spent his leisure time writing serious piano music and light songs. A composition he entered the 1950 Brighton Music Festival won first prize and several of his classical works were performed at London's Wigmore Hall during the 1950s.

== "Little Donkey" and 1960s pop writer ==
In 1959, while hawking his more commercial songs to London's Tin Pan Alley music publishers, Boswell encountered Gracie Fields at the music publisher Chappell, who she was visiting to seek a song to revive her career. Boswell offered her "Little Donkey", his telling of Mary and Joseph's journey to Bethlehem, and Fields' recording and another by The Beverley Sisters, made the song the Christmas hit of 1959, being No. 1 in the then dominant UK Sheet Music Chart from mid November until New Year. The song was a hit again at Christmas 1960 for Nina & Frederik.

By now Boswell had a publishing contract with Chappell, and wrote songs for them through the 1960s including Matt Monro's "I'll Know Her" and Ricky Valance's "Why Can't We". The latter (Valance's follow up to "Tell Laura I Love Her") came third in 1961's A Song For Europe. Boswell wrote the second placed song as well, "Suddenly I'm in Love", sung by Steve Arlen, which fell one vote short of representing the UK at 1961's Eurovision Song Contest. Meanwhile, "Little Donkey" was steadily re-recorded by artists as diverse as Vera Lynn, Don Estelle, St Winifred's School Choir and, in later decades, Aled Jones, Patti Page, Camera Obscura (who performed the song as part of a John Peel Session) and Cerys Matthews.

In 1970, Boswell wrote another Christmas song "Boy From Bethlehem", for his new publishers William Elkin. Although always in the shadow of "Little Donkey", "Boy From Bethlehem" was recorded by the London Children's Choir and like its predecessor is often sung in British schools at Christmas. As well as being a jobbing pop writer, Boswell was continuing to write classical library music and his The Enchantress has underscored several films.

Because Boswell had been concerned his academic employers would disapprove of his extracurricular career, he used a pen name derived from Boswell's Drive, Chelmsford, the street where he lived. Eventually, just ahead of his 1976 remarriage, he also changed his real name by deed poll to Eric Boswell.

== The Geordie scene 1970s–1980s ==
By the end of the 1960s, following The Beatles' example, pop artists wrote their own songs rather than have backroom composers. Boswell instead began to write folk songs about his native North East England, where he had returned to teach at Sunderland Polytechnic. A combination of local talent, generous arts funding and the patronage of regional ITV franchise Tyne Tees meant the local cultural scene around Newcastle upon Tyne was thriving by the mid-1970s and Boswell, along with humorous dialect writer Scott Dobson and Geordie revivalist historian Joe Ging became key figures.

A Tyne Tees arts programme What Fettle, presented by When The Boat Comes In actors Ed Wilson and James Bolam, hired Boswell as musical director and his new songs and ballads about the North East featured weekly, performed by local soprano Marian Aitchison and tenors Ralph Hawkes and Michael Hunt, as well as in a networked programme Sounds of Britain. Boswell's material (often described as 'Geordie' but frequently set in the wider region including Northumberland and Wearside) was often very funny, sometimes ideological (including possibly the first song lamenting global warming), but always celebrated the peculiarities of the region, its self-deprecating humour and idiosyncratic dialect.

A local radio programme and later annual Newcastle City Hall show Geordierama was musically directed by Boswell and featured his songs alongside Northumbrian folk dancers, pipers and comedians. Hosted by local celebrities including Mike Neville, Bill Steel and Frank Wappat, the stage Geordierama was part of the annual Newcastle Festival for much of the 1970s, later moving to the New Tyne Theatre, and vinyl recordings of the shows were released. Meanwhile, Tyne Tees asked Boswell to write a song welcoming President Jimmy Carter to the north on a 1976 Bicentennial visit to his ancestral home in Washington, Tyne & Wear which resulted in "Welcome To Geordieland". And in the early 1980s, Sunderland comedian The Little Waster, Bobby Thompson recorded several humorous songs written for him by Boswell.

Also in the 1980s Boswell, on piano, formed a chamber trio with Aitchison and Ging named Sounds of Tyne & Wear, which performed his songs around the region for many years, often called upon by the Lord Mayor of Newcastle to entertain visiting dignitaries to the city, which on one occasion included Prince Philip.

== Musical theatre: Catherine Cookson's Katie Mulholland ==
1983 poster promoting the stage musical Katie Mulholland

In the early 1980s, Boswell approached Tyneside novelist Catherine Cookson with an idea (of his second wife, Lena) he adapt Cookson's semi-autobiographical Katie Mulholland into a stage musical. Directed by Ken Hill, who also wrote dialogue around Boswell's songs, an elaborate staging formed the centrepiece of the 1983 Newcastle Festival, selling out Newcastle Playhouse for five weeks. Boswell's slightly Sondheimesque score included pastiches of gospel, vaudeville and barbershop. His existing song, "Jenny Was There", a paean to the annual funfair on Newcastle Town Moor known as 'The Hoppin's' was suitably amended to 'Katie' for the production, but the other numbers were newly written. The musical's success may have inspired the flurry of subsequent stage and television dramatisations of Cookson's novels.

== New collaborations ==
In 1985, Boswell left Sunderland for the North Tyne village of Humshaugh, where he would spend the rest of his life. The heyday of the Geordie scene had passed but he continued to write invariably humorous songs: leeks, whippets and racing pigeons all featuring, as did the new Millennium Bridge and Gateshead MetroCentre. The Tyneside a cappella choir Spectrum performed and recorded Boswell's work and County Durham opera singer Graeme Danby, principal bass of English National Opera, became an enthusiastic supporter: most of Boswell's later songs being written for Danby and his partner, mezzo-soprano Valerie Reid, to perform at their Northumberland open-air concerts, and the pair released two albums of his material. Meanwhile, some of Boswell's 1970s ballads such as "Tyneside's Where I Come From", "Sweet Waters of Tyne" and "But It's Mine", had joined "The Blaydon Races" and "The Lambton Worm" in the canon of northern traditional songs, and are still regularly performed in the region's folk clubs.

== Later life ==
Boswell was intensely private. He had mixed feelings about "Little Donkey", prouder of his humorous work, believing laughter was 'what life is all about'. In later years he rarely ventured beyond his beloved Northumberland countryside. He remained a celebrity in Humshaugh however, writing music for village shows and playing the church organ for services well into his eighties, often slipping in his own music or some Gilbert & Sullivan as the congregation left. In 2005, Boswell's record company MWM enhanced earlier analogue recordings to produce a retrospective double album of his folk songs. And early in 2009 Boswell attended a recording session for Graeme Danby's second album of his songs, which included a golden anniversary 'duet' of "Little Donkey" between Danby and Gracie Fields, some 30 years after the latter had died.

Boswell married twice, Margaret (two sons and three grandsons) and Lena (one son), both his wives predeceased him. He died on 29 November 2009 aged 88, shortly after moving to a nursing home in Riding Mill and exactly 50 years after his most famous song was riding high in the UK chart.

== Eric Boswell Memorial Prize ==
An annual competition runs in Boswell's name for a new Folk song about the North East of England.

== Discography and bibliography ==
Eric Boswell: Left to Write (MWM Records, 1976), Spectrum: Spectrum Sing Boswell (1987), Graeme Danby & Valerie Reid: Take Me Up the Tyne (MWM Records), Various: Eric Boswell: Archive - Songs of the North (MWM Records, 2005), Graeme Danby & Valerie Reid: There's More to Life (MWM Records, 2009)

Eric Boswell: 'Little Donkey' (Chappell, 1959) – sheet music (and in many compilations), Eric Boswell: Boy from Bethlehem (William Elkin, 1970) – sheet music, Eric Boswell: Songs of the North East (in four volumes: North Tyne Publications, Vol 1–2, 1995, Vol 3–4, 2000) – piano/guitar songbooks, Jan Lewis: Little Donkey (Orchard, 2002) – children's picture book inspired by the song

== Appendix: Songs by Boswell ==
Christmas songs "Boy From Bethlehem", "How Many Days To Christmas Eve", "Little Donkey".

1960s pop songs "Come And Get It", "Coming Home", "Couldn't Care Less", "English Weather", "Everybody Falls in Love in Springtime", "Happy Trumpet Man", "Haven't Got A Girl", "Home Again", "I Know What I Want", "I'll Know Her", "It's You That I Love", "Money in My Pocket", "My Dream of Spring", "Old Oak Tree", "She's Got Something", "So This Is Love", "Someone", "Suddenly I'm in Love", "There Is A Reason For Everything", "This Day I Promise", "What D'You Know", "When Will You Love Me", "Where You Are", "Why Can't We".

Classical music The Enchantress

Folk songs "Aye-You-Aye*, The Ballad of Geordie Washington, Bird Fly High, Blinkin' Eye Millennium Bridge, A Blushing English Rose*, But It's Mine, Cawd Feet, Come The Global Warming, The Doomsday Song, Everything Changes, Father's on the Beer Again, The First Footin' Song, The Frustrated Fishwife, The Gateshead Angel of the North, A Geordie Love Song, The Ghost of St Mary's, The Girl From Outer Space, The Girl on the Cheviot Hills, The Golden Voice of Bobby, The Good Old Bad Old Days, Got To Get Away, The Great Longbenton Leek, The Highland Chorus, I Cann't Help Havin' A Sort of Feelin', I Got A Bun in the Oven, I Waited on the North Dock, I Will Not Lose You Now*, I've Got A Daft Pigeon, I've Got A Little Whippet, I've Got To Propose*, I've Seen You Somewhere Before*, Katie's in Love*, Katie Mulholland's The Name*, Katie Was There* (originally Jenny Was There), Lookin' For A Girl, Mary Ann, Mary Lister (lyrics traditional), Maybe This Is Love, The MetroCentre, The Multiplication Song, My Girl From The North Land, My Gorgeous WWW Girl, My Own Bonny Lad, Never Like This*, North of the Tyne, Nothing's Quite The Same, Ower Young To Be Married Yet, The Parting, This Place Is on My Mind, Playing Hard To Get, The Rain Started Falling, The Saga of Hadrian's Wall, The Social Security Waltz, The Summer of Last Year, Supermarket Blues, Sweet Waters of Tyne, Take It Easy*, Take Me Up The Tyne, There'll Be No-one Else For Me, There's More To Life Than Women And Beer, They Don't Write Songs Like These, A Thousand Years From Now, Tyneside's Where I Come From, Wait For Me*, Welcome To Geordieland, We've Got Everything*, What's A Woman For*, What's Life All About?, What Became of Yesterday*, When I Was A Lad, Where Are We Going From Here?, With Me Pit Claes On, You Are For Me, You Little Waster, You'll Be Laughing, You'll Never Find A Woman Like Me" (* featured in the musical Katie Mulholland)

== See also ==
Geordie dialect words
