= Eric Boswell =

Eric Boswell may refer to:

- Eric Boswell (songwriter) (1921–2009), songwriter known for the Christmas song "Little Donkey"
- Eric J. Boswell (born 1945), United States Assistant Secretary of State for Diplomatic Security
