= Freddie Mudditt =

English photographer (1926/1927–1985)

Freddie Brandon Mudditt (1926/1927 — October 1985), also known as Fred Mudditt, was an English photographer and police officer from South Shields, in Tyne and Wear, England. He was known for documenting the people, events and public life of South Tyneside during the mid to late twentieth century.

== Career ==
Mudditt served as a police officer in the Laygate area of South Shields before joining the police forensics department as a scenes-of-crime photographer after his interest in photography became known to his superiors.

He left the police in 1966 and established the freelance photography business Fietscher Fotos, later relocating it to Albemarle Street in South Shields.

Mudditt undertook commissions for the Bailey entertainment group, supplied photographs to the Shields Gazette, and later worked as South Tyneside Council's official photographer for approximately ten years.

== Photography ==
Throughout his career Mudditt documented community life in South Shields, including carnivals, fetes, entertainment venues, sporting events and the Great North Run. He also produced aerial photographs of the town, after joining other photographers in funding charter flights over South Shields.

His photographs included images of Elizabeth II, Diana, Princess of Wales, Muhammad Ali who did a bus tour of South Shields, Jimi Hendrix, Catherine Cookson, James Mitchell and Bobby Thompson.

Mudditt photographed Jimi Hendrix during his 1967 appearance at the New Cellar Club in South Shields.

He also photographed performers and nightlife at Club Latino, including Tom Jones, Alan Price and Georgie Fame.

Mudditt photographed Queen Elizabeth II during her 1977 Silver Jubilee visit to Gypsies Green in South Shields.

== Death and legacy ==
Mudditt died suddenly on 14 October 1985, at the age of 58, after collapsing in his darkroom at home.

His daughters, Julia Northam and Janis Liddle, subsequently led the preservation and digitisation of his photographic archive. By 2017, and after assistance from relatives and local sources, they had assembled a collection of approximately 2,000 photographs. Many photos were found and scanned via the local council's archives held by South Tyneside Libraries.

Their work helped preserve Mudditt's photographic legacy. In turn this has contributed to the continued publication of his photographs in retrospective newspaper features, as well as museum collections and local heritage projects, documenting the history of South Tyneside.
