= Annett Wolf =

Danish-born director, writer and producer (1936–2025)

Annett Wolf (September 11, 1936 – February 23, 2025) was a Danish-born director, writer, producer, and interviewer for television documentaries, feature films and stage plays. Between 1962 and 1977, she worked for Danmarks Radio, the Danish Broadcasting Corporation, directing numerous in-depth profiles with artists such as Jacques Brel, Jerry Lewis, Dave Allen, Peter Ustinov and Peter Sellers. These documentaries were shot on location. In Hollywood, she directed a series of in-depth profiles with Jack Lemmon, Alfred Hitchcock, Walter Matthau and Telly Savalas. She also directed Hurray for Hollywood, a three-part documentary series about Hollywood and the American film industry.

Wolf received the Billedbladets Gyldne Rose (the Danish People's Choice Award) in 1976 for Jack Lemmon - A Twist of Lemmon, and in 1977 for Hurray for Hollywood. She then established herself as an independent Hollywood producer and directed documentaries, making-of featurettes, and trailers to promote major productions overseas. She left the United States in 1990 and resided in Halifax, Nova Scotia, Canada. She was in pre-production for the feature film So It Was.

Wolf was not to be confused with her daughter, Hollywood publicist Annett Wolf Junior.

== Early life ==
Annett Wolf was born in Copenhagen, Denmark, the daughter of Amory and Halfdan Wolf, owner and CEO of the wine importing agency Louis Wolf. In 1955 and 1956, she was trained by expert wine makers across Europe. She joined the family business for a short period of time, but then decided to pursue her passion for theatre, history, and drama, concluding her studies in England, Scotland and Spain.

== Career ==
=== 1962–1976 ===
In 1961, Wolf began working for Danmarks Radio, the Danish Broadcasting Corporation, as a production assistant. In 1962, she started filming jazz concerts (Bud Powell at the Montmartre Jazz club) and went on producing and directing television specials with American jazz musicians such as Erroll Garner, Bill Evans, Dexter Gordon, Dave Brubeck, Stan Getz and Ben Webster. It was also at this point she began her collaboration with the Danish jazz trumpeter and composer Palle Mikkelborg, and bass player Niels-Henning Ørsted Pedersen. Mikkelborg continues to compose and arrange the scores for Wolf's films to this day. She also worked with the American jazz saxophonist Sahib Shihab, who wrote the score for two of her films: Theme in D Minor (1963), a poetic exploration of Copenhagen by night and The Girl with the Ballet Slippers (1965), a jazz pantomime conceived by Finn Methling. The same year she co-wrote and directed Charlie Chaplin, The Man, the Clown and the Director, a three-part documentary series based on Chaplin's My Autobiography, and La Grande Famille (The Big Family), a feature documentary centered around the Spanish clown Charlie Rivel, the Rivel family and the Danish circus dynasty the Shumann's. In 1966, she convinced French mime Marcel Marceau to collaborate in writing an original visual autobiography. The Visual World of Marcel Marceau (1967) was the first color film ever broadcast by Danish TV. The drafts and final screenplay are now part of the collections of the Bibliothèque Nationale de France.

In 1969, she worked for the first time with the actor Erik Mørk, directing a television special focused on the poems and short stories by the French writer Boris Vian (Boris Vian - Erik Mørk). Throughout the 1960s Annett Wolf worked at a continuous pace, writing, producing and directing numerous documentaries and in-depth profiles each year for Danmarks Radio: musical specials (with Eartha Kitt, Bent Fabric, Juliette Gréco, Nina & Frederik and Charles Aznavour), documentaries, comedies/satires (Hov, hov). Intrigued by the technique of silent films, she produced and directed The Man Who Lost His Shoe (1969) and A Man in Search of His Soul (1971), written by Finn Methling, and starring Preben Lerdorff Rye and Berthe Quistgaard.

In addition to her broadcast career, she also worked as a theater director with her productions at the Royal Danish Theater of Micheál Mac Liammóir‘s play The Importance of Being Oscar (1970) and the Danish adaptation of the American musical revue Jacques Brel is Alive and Well and Living in Paris (1971), both starring actor Erik Mørk. Later, she adapted both productions for Danish television: Jacques Brel er i live, har det godt og bor i Paris (1974) and En aften med Oscar Wilde (1986).

During her years at Danmarks Radio, she directed numerous in-depth profiles and interviews, often shot on location: Ord et Mord uden M (1972), an essay about the Danish poet Ivan Malinowski, The World of Jerry Lewis (1972) filmed in Sweden on the set of the unreleased film The Day the Clown Cried, The World of Peter Ustinov (1973), filmed in Geneva, The World of Peter Sellers (1975), filmed in Nice and The World of Dave Allen (1975), the profile of the Irish satirist Dave Allen. The long-form interview became Wolf's trademark, which news reporter Joan Crosby summarized for the Oakland Tribune:

I've viewed several of her documentaries One, an interview with Jerry Lewis, is a powerful piece of film which will never be shown because it dealt with a film he was producing and directing from his own script and which was never completed because money ran out. It's rare to see an interview with a star which leaves the viewer in tears, but that's what happens here as Lewis himself is seen crying and totally vulnerable. A remarkable portrait of a human being. But then Annett's very humanity is the essence that permits her to gently and deeply probe her subjects until they strip away the professional facade and reveal the human beneath.

Her admiration for the Belgian singer and lyricist Jacques Brel led her to the in-depth profile The World of Jacques Brel (1972), shot in Knokke-le-Zoute in Flanders. Fascinated with the history of the French song, she often visited Paris where she directed The World of Barbara (1972), a portrait of the French singer Barbara, and Le Temps de Vivre (1974), a three-part documentary series recording the history of French songs and ballads from the 1920s to the 1970s. The series includes original interviews with, among others, Georges Brassens, Michel Simon, Bruno Coquatrix, Serge Reggiani, Pierre Seghers, Jacques Brel, Barbara, Michel Piccoli, Georges Moustaki, Gilbert Bécaud, Serge Gainsbourg, Jane Birkin, Yves Montand, and Claude François. Her productions received critical acclaim in the national daily newspapers Politiken and Berlingske Tidende.

In 1976, she decided to take a one-year leave of absence from Danmarks Radio and went to Hollywood. With an American crew, she shot Jack Lemmon - A Twist of Lemmon, an-in-depth profile of Jack Lemmon, followed by The World of Alfred Hitchcock and Telly Savalas Alias Theo Kojak. That same year came Hurray for Hollywood, a three-part series on Hollywood and the American film industry featuring Robert Evans, John Schlesinger, Dustin Hoffman, John Cassavetes, Steven Spielberg, Michael Schultz, John Frankenheimer, Norman Jewison, Richard D. Zanuck and David Brown. This series of shows was produced in cooperation with Danmarks Radio.

=== 1977–1990 ===
In 1977, director Dwight Hemion and producer Gary Smith were commissioned by the CBS television network to produce a one-hour special, Elvis in Concert. The show became Elvis Presley's final tour. Wolf was hired to cover all the behind the scenes activities and to interview Elvis's fans. She also interviewed Elvis Presley's father Vernon Presley. The show was aired October 3, 1977—two months after Elvis Presley's death.

In 1978, Wolf decided to settle permanently in Los Angeles. She wrote, produced and directed the documentary Jaws 2 – the making-of for the producers Richard D. Zanuck and David Brown.

Under contract to major studios (Universal, Paramount Pictures, 20th century Fox), she started to shape the "making of" genre: Star Trek: The Motion Picture (1979), Paradise Alley (1978), Nighthawks (1979) Dracula (1979), starring Frank Langella, 48 Hrs. (1980), Somewhere in Time (1980), Ghost Story (1981), Missing (1982), Cat People (1982) amongst others. First under the banner of Don Stern Productions, and from 1981 on, with her own company, Mc Curry-Wolf enterprises, these documentaries, trailers, featurettes, behind the scenes and interviews, were often announced and reviewed in issues of The Hollywood Reporter and Variety, and used to promote and market the American major films overseas through United International Pictures, London.

In 1980, she also directed It's a New Day, a short documentary on new attitudes and technologies which are helping the physically handicapped overcome their difficulties. Written and produced by Fern Field for the South Bay Mayor's Committee for the Employment of the Handicapped, the film won a CINE Golden Eagle and a Silver Cindy in the Chicago International Film Festival.

In 1985, Wolf went to Stockholm to interview the Russian ballet dancer Rudolf Nureyev. Face to Face with Rudolf Nureyev was produced for ABC's Arts Cable and Entertel, Inc.

In April 1986, a tribute was held at the American Film Institute to celebrate her 25th anniversary in the business.

In 1986 and 1987, she hosted An Evening With…, a series of live conversations in Los Angeles with guests: Dudley Moore, Sydney Pollack, Sir David Puttnam, Michel Legrand and Marcel Marceau.

In 1988, she joined advertising executive Harry Webber, directing the musical drama Crossfire. 23 young former gang members of the Bounty Hunter Bloods from the Nickerson Gardens Housing Projects in Watts told their personal stories on stage. Crossfire was credited by the Los Angeles Times as being the first serious effort by the L.A. gangs to stop a war that claimed 300 young lives every year. The taping of the play is freely and legally available to watch on the internet.

Following Crossfire, Wolf spent much of her time fundraising to help save prematurely born HIV-positive babies and support their teenage mothers before she left the United States in 1990.

== Advocacy ==
=== 1982–1990 ===
Annett Wolf also served as the Los Angeles chair of the Performing Arts Committee for Scandinavia Today, Los Angeles

In 1983, Scandinavia Today was a celebration of Scandinavian film, art and culture taking place in Los Angeles and New York. Besides chairing the event, Wolf was the presenter and interviewer of live conversations with Danish director Bille August, Swedish actors Max von Sydow, Liv Ullmann, Harriet Anderson, Ingrid Thulin and cinematographer Sven Nykvist.

In cooperation with Geoffrey Gilmore, head of the school of Theater, Film and Television at UCLA, University of California, Los Angeles the Scandinavia Today committee commissioned the complete restoration of Danish director Carl Theodor Dreyer’s 1928 avant-garde silent film classic The Passion of Joan of Arc. The Danish composer Ole Schmidt created an original score for orchestra and chorus in 1982, and the film premiered in 1983 at a live performance at the Wadsworth Theater of Performing Arts in Los Angeles.

Wolf also hosted and presented the American premiere of Ingmar Bergman's drama Fanny and Alexander at the Academy of Arts and Sciences Theater in Beverly Hills.

In 1983, Wolf co-founded Women in Film and Television International (WIFTI), a global network of some 40 Women in Film Chapters worldwide with over 13,000 members dedicated to advancing professional development and achievement for women working in all areas of film, video, and other screen-based media. Wolf was the organization's first President.

When WIFTI organized a tribute to Norman Jewison and Miloš Forman, Wolf hosted the live conversations with the two directors.

During that decade, she lectured and conducted workshops on film directing and the art of the in depth interview in UCLA, University of Southern California and the American Film Institute.

=== 1991–2015 ===
In 2000, Wolf founded The Wolf Foundation, a non-profit organization established to protect and preserve the natural balance of the Arctic environment and its wildlife. In 2004, she went to Yellowknife, in the Canadian Northwest Territories to research arctic wildlife especially wolves in the Thelon Wildlife Sanctuary. Since then she has often been back to the Canadian Arctic where she continued her commitment to protect and preserve the Arctic environment.

In 2005, she published her autobiography The Wolf and the Glass Eye (Ulven og Glasøjet) in Denmark.

Wolf continued to lecture on documentaries and "The art of the in-depth Interview" at the University of King's College and mentor students producing the podcast "We Are Talking", conversations with a community of thinkers, dedicated to talking through some of today's most topical themes. Wolf also taught film and "The art of the in-depth Interview" at Dalhousie University, Halifax. Since 2013, she had been working with students from the sustainability and environmental department at Dalhousie University researching the impact of climate change in the Inuit communities, the environment and the wildlife in the Canadian Arctic.

She was preparing a feature film, "A Band Of Two". The film would tell the story of a woman in her seventies. Driven by the childhood vision of an imperial white wolf, challenged and haunted by memories, she embarks on an epic adventure in the Arctic. The project was being set up as an international co-production to be shot in the Canadian Arctic, Spain, England, Wales and Denmark.

== Later events ==
In January 2016, the French Cinémathèque française in Paris held a large retrospective of her body of work consisting of 25 films. Wolf attended the event, introduced many screenings and gave a masterclass.

It was the first time her films were screened in France, and the retrospective was granted a large press coverage. French critic Jacques Mandelbaum in Le Monde newspaper called her "The lady who makes the stars open up".

While Wolf was in Paris, French filmmaker Damien Bertrand, who also served as a curator for the retrospective, directed an hour-long in-depth profile, Instantanés du XXe siècle : Annett Wolf , produced by Narratio Films. The film premiered at Cinémathèque française in March 2017 and was later broadcast on TV the same year.

In October 2017, the Danish Film Institute also held a retrospective of her body of work, which also drew much attention from the press, including a 6-page story in the national daily newspaper Politiken.

== Personal life and death ==
Annett Wolf was the mother of Annett Wolf Junior, Hollywood publicist, co-founder of Wolf-Kasteler Public Relations (WK-PR agency.) On February 23, 2025, Annett died at the age of 88.

== Organizations ==
- Wise Wolf Productions: President and Founder (2012)
- The Wolf Foundation: President and Founder (2000)
- The Wise Wolf and Friends Company, Inc.: President and Founder (Nova Scotia, 2008)

== Professional affiliations ==
- The Association of Danish Film Directors: Member
- Women in Film and Television Atlantic: Honorary Board Member
- Women in Film and Television International (WIFTI): Honorary Board Member
- Women in Film and Television Toronto: Honorary Member
- Women in Film International (Los Angeles): Co-Founder and President
- Women in Film (Los Angeles): Board member/Vice-President
- The Performing Arts Committee for Scandinavia Today (Los Angeles): Chair
- The Int'l Advisory Committee of the American Cinematheque (Los Angeles): Member
- The University of California, Los Angeles: Lecturer
- The University of Southern California (Los Angeles): Lecturer
- The American Film Institute (Los Angeles): Lecturer
- American Cinematheque (Los Angeles): Lecturer

== Main filmography ==
- "Theme in D Minor" – 1964
- The Girl with the Ballet Sleeper (Pigesko) – 1965
- Charles Chaplin, the Man, the Clown and the Director (Charlie Chaplin: Mennesket, klovnen og instruktøren) – 1965
- La Grande Famille (Den Store Familie) – 1965
- The Visual World of Marcel Marceau (Le Monde Visuel de Marcel Marceau, En Mimikers Verden - Marcel Marceau) – 1967
- Fata Morgana : Nina and Frederyk – 1967
- Expo 1968 (Kvinden 68) – 1968
- Boris Vian / Erik Mørk – 1969
- The Man who Lost his Shoe (Manden der Mistede Sin ene Sko) – 1969
- A Man in Search of his Soul (En Sømand har sin Enegang) – 1971
- The World of Jacques Brel (Le Monde de Jacques Brel, Jacques Brel og hans Verden) – 1972
- Ord Er Et Mord Uden M – Ivan Malinowski – 1972
- The World of Barbara (Le Monde de Barbara, Barbara og hendes Verden) – 1972
- Danmarks Schade - Schades Danmark – 1972
- The World of Jerry Lewis (Jerry Lewis og hans Verden) – 1972
- The World of Peter Ustinov (Peter Ustinov og hans Verden) – 1973
- Le Temps de Vivre (Tid til at Leve, The Time to Live) – 1974
- The World of Peter Sellers (Peter Sellers og hans Verden) – 1975
- The World of Dave Allen – 1975
- Jack Lemmon - A Twist of Lemmon – 1976
- The World of Alfred Hitchcock (Alfred Hitchcock og hans Verden) – 1976
- The World of Walter Matthau (Walter Matthau og hans Verden) – 1976
- Telly Savalas alias Theo Kojak – 1976
- Hurray for Hollywood (Hollywood 76 / 77) – 1977
- Elvis in Concert – 1977 (writer and behind the scenes footage director)
- Jaws 2 - The Making-off – 1978
- Star Trek, The Motion Picture - The Making-off – 1979
- Dracula (1979) - The Making-off – 1979
- 48hrs. - The Making-off – 1980
- Missing - The Making-off – 1982
- Face to Face with Rudolf Nureyev – 1985
