= Fiona François =

British diplomat (born 1980)

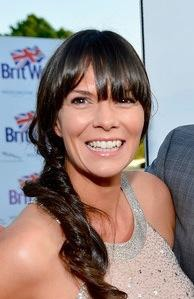
- François in 2013
- Born: Fiona Jane François; 22 May 1980 (age 46); York, England
- Education: Northumbria University
- Occupation: CFO at Communify Fincentric
- Years active: 2001–present
- Spouse: Eric H François (2006–present)
- Children: 2

Fiona Jane François (born Fiona Jane Mackay, 22 May 1980) is a British diplomat who is the Chairman and former President of the British American Business Council, Los Angeles Chapter. She was formerly HM Consul and Director for the Western Region of UK Trade & Investment's US Network.

== Early life and education ==
Born in York, she studied economics, politics and sociology at the University of Northumbria at Newcastle upon Tyne where she graduated with honours. In 2009, François was appointed HM Consul and Director for the Western Region of UK Trade & Investment's US Network. Based at the British Consulate-General in Los Angeles,

== Career ==
François has been Chief Financial Officer since the acquisition of Fincentric by Just Build It (JBI) company led by the former founders of InvestCloud, in partnership with Stellex Capital Management.

François is Operating Partner at JBI. The JBI mission is to design, build, and renovate companies to be best in class. JBI’s focus is on a) Marketing and b) Innovation to automate and scale the financial sector.

François joined the board of charity Cinemagic in May 2024.

François is the former President of Sales Operations at InvestCloud, a California-founded financial technology platform.

François is a Member of the Board of BritWeek, a not-for-profit organization focusing on the British contribution to business, film, fashion and music in Southern California. Through Britweek, Francois supports various charities including, LA's BEST, Malaria No More, Save The Children, Virgin Unite.

François created the first UKTI / Britweek Business Innovation Awards in 2010 for Businesses with joint operations in the UK and California to be recognized for their achievements in innovation before an audience of elite international commercial players, as well as the wider California business community. François shortlists finalist in each category to be judged by renowned business leaders. Past judges were, Andy Bird Chairman of Walt Disney International, Ian Callum Design Director for Jaguar, Carlos Amezcua, Co-Anchor Fox 11 News and Sir Ken Robinson Internationally Renowned Creativity Expert. Past honored speakers were Simon Cowell, Nigel Lythgoe will.i.am and Frank Mottek.

Francois is the Chairman and former President of the British American Business Council (BABC) and actively supports the chapters in Los Angeles, Orange County, San Francisco, the Pacific North West, Chicago and Houston

== Awards ==
In 2013, François was one of the top 5 finalists for the L.A. Business Journal's "Women Making A Difference" Awards. Fiona was one of 252 nominees for the 2013 Awards in the "Rising Star" category.
