= Willie Can =

Single by Mitch Miller And His Orchestra And Chorus
- B-side: "Lisbon Antigua"
- Released: 1956
- Recorded: 1955
- Genre: Country and western
- Length: 2:14
- Label: Columbia
- Songwriter: Boudleaux Bryant

"Willie Can" Is a popular hit song written in 1955 by the American country and western songwriter Boudleaux Bryant and his wife Felice Bryant. It reached the charts in 1956 in the US with the Mitch Miller version (#30) and in the UK with Alma Cogan's (#13).

The song gives a list of activities and kindnesses that the woman singer would wish to have in a lover and husband.

It was recorded by:

- Mitch Miller and His Orchestra and Chorus (USA) in January 1956
- Alma Cogan with Choir and Orchestra conducted by Frank Cordell (UK) in March 1956
- The Beverley Sisters with The Roland Shaw Orchestra (UK) in March 1956
- Sue Thompson (USA) in January 1963

== Form of the song ==
The song lists the things the female singer requires of her suitor. These vary between versions but in full are:

To cook, save a dollar bill, sew, give a girl a thrill, ride a black-eyed stallion, fight a bear, love, braid her hair, do the things she asks him, dance, prance, take her to the fair, say he cares, dig a hole to China, climb a tree, kiss and kiss her, do the things she asks him (and do them true), run, catch a honey bee, sing and sing to her, try to swim the Channel, fly a kite, be bold, hold her, squeeze her tight, run, sing, sing to her.

The Beverley Sisters version adds:- crossing a burning desert and crossing the sea.

The list is broken up by a chorus which runs:

Willie can, Willie can, Willie can, fair lady If Willie takes a shine to you
