= Elvis in Concert =

1977 film by Dwight Hemion

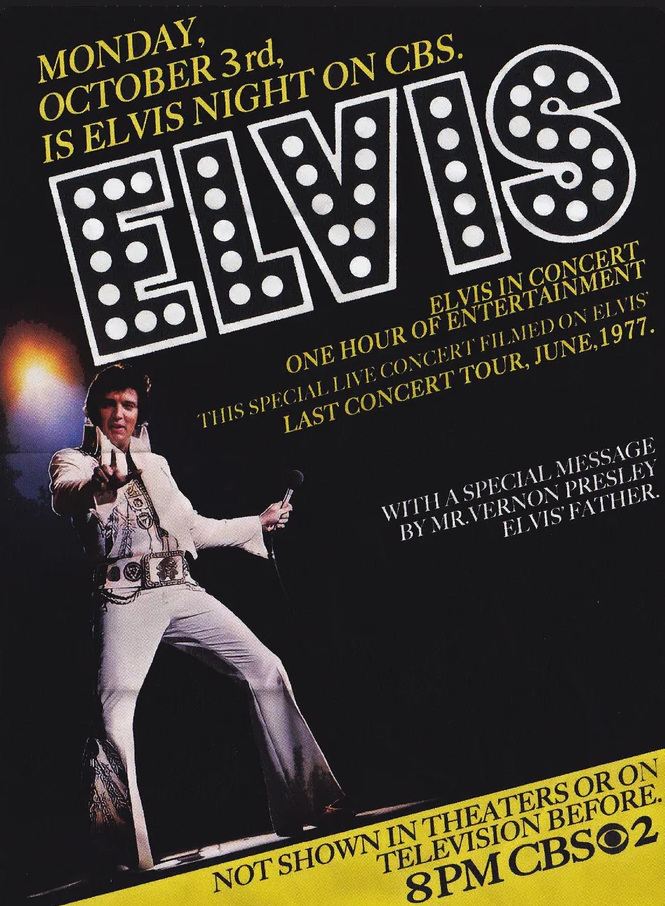
- Publicity poster for the show
- Written by: Annett Wolf
- Directed by: Dwight Hemion
- Starring: Elvis Presley
- Music by: Joe Guercio; Felton Jarvis
- Country of origin: United States
- Original language: English

Production
- Producers: Dwight Hemion; Gary Smith
- Editor: Andy Zall
- Running time: 50 minutes

Original release
- Release: October 3, 1977

Elvis in Concert is a television special originally aired by CBS on October 3, 1977, starring Elvis Presley and produced by Dwight Hemion and Gary Smith. The posthumous program was filmed in Omaha, Nebraska, and Rapid City, South Dakota, in June 1977, during Presley's last concert tour. It became the singer's third and last television special.

By the late 1970s, Presley suffered from multiple health issues, and he was heavily dependent on prescription narcotics following a decade of heavy use: his physical appearance was affected as he gained weight, while his ability to perform on stage was compromised. Additionally, Presley's personal relationships were strained, and the singer was involved in an FBI investigation after he was the victim of a scam surrounding one of his personal jets.

His manager, Colonel Tom Parker, worked on a deal with CBS at the time for the new special to be filmed during Presley's tour in the summer of 1977. Parker was criticized by Presley's close entourage for accepting the deal despite the singer's poor condition. The dates were selected by the television network for the similarity of its arenas and proximity. Minimal footage of the first night could be used due to Presley's poor performance, while most of the special consisted of the Rapid City concert. The special was completed with backstage footage and interviews that were interspersed with the concert.

Despite Presley's death on August 16, 1977, the network chose to keep the original October release date for the special. Elvis in Concert was met with reviews that mostly focused on Presley's degraded appearance and performance, while also remarking on the support his fans still showed. The program became the most-watched show for that week with 24.1 million spectators. Footage of the special was included in films and documentaries in the following decades, but no official releases on home media were produced by Elvis Presley Enterprises on account of Presley's appearance.

== Background ==
Elvis Presley had been routinely taking a mixture of amphetamines and diet pills during his movie career in the 1960s. At the time, he used the former to stay awake for longer working hours and the latter to keep his weight under control. His future wife, Priscilla, noticed that his behavior became increasingly erratic, fueled by his use of uppers, downers, and sleeping pills during the filming of Fun in Acapulco. George C. Nichopoulos first treated Presley for insomnia in 1967, and he later became his personal physician in 1970 during the singer's second residency in Las Vegas. Presley performed two shows each night, and he received amphetamines before the start and tranquilizers by the end of each appearance. Nichopoulos made attempts to reduce his patient's intake of pharmaceuticals, but Presley would have other doctors write prescriptions when he refused to.

By 1973, Presley's dependency increased as he started to tour on a far more demanding schedule. In February, he overdosed on barbiturates and was in a coma for three days; while during a tour stop in St. Louis, he overdosed again. By the end of the year, he was admitted to Baptist Memorial Hospital in Memphis because of a Demerol addiction and poisoning by cortisol injections. Nichopoulos then placed him on a methadone treatment. Due to Presley's insistence on receiving pills, the doctor started to give him placebos, and he commissioned Knoll Pharmaceuticals to manufacture a special batch of fake Dilaudid for Presley. In a later interview, Nichopoulos stated that Presley did not see his personal use of pharmaceuticals as an addiction and that he considered his intake acceptable since it was prescribed by a doctor. His close entourage later pointed out in different interviews or memoirs that Presley's heavy use of prescription drugs may have been related to career disappointment, failed relationships, spiritual loss, and other issues that the singer faced at the time. By 1977, his health had declined from years of abuse: Presley suffered multiple issues, including glaucoma, high blood pressure, liver damage, and an enlarged colon, each aggravated—and possibly caused—by his drug abuse. In 1977 alone, Nichopoulos prescribed him with 10,000 doses of assorted narcotics. Additionally, Presley was 40 pounds (18 kg) overweight and had a predilection for junk food.

Presley's ability to perform in concert deteriorated: the singer lacked energy and, on occasion, cut his shows short due to his health issues. While his fan base still showed support, the reviews often noted his bad condition. In August 1976, the Houston Post noted in its review by Bob Claypool that the latest concert in the city was "awful" and a "depressingly incoherent, amateurish mess" performed by a "bloated, stumbling, and mumbling figure" who did not reflect his image as "'The King' of anything, least of all, rock 'n' roll". Claypool described that the sold-out arena, The Summit, was packed with 17,500 fans that were either "die-hard screamer(s)" or "blank, stunned faces" because of Presley's appearance. The reviewer further described him as not being as "fat" as much as "absolutely bloated". While he continued to note the loyalty of Presley's fans, he opined that the singer became a "heartless parody of his former self" due to the reduced movements, which he perceived as "clumsy", and his "lumbering" walk on stage. Claypool closed by remarking that "the man who had given us the original myth of rock 'n' roll" was now "for whatever reason, taking it all back". After Presley fired part of his close entourage, his former friends and bodyguards Sonny and Red West published the tell-all book Elvis: What Happened?, written by journalist Steve Dunleavy. Meanwhile, Presley's father, Vernon, was also suffering from heart disease.

Presley's relationship with his manager, Colonel Tom Parker, had been strained on and off for a number of years, and they did not speak often. While Presley struggled with his drug dependency, Parker had a gambling issue, and he racked up major debts at the tables of the Las Vegas Hilton. On April 30, 1977, Parker denied to The Tennessean the news that appeared in the Nashville Banner the previous day of a possible sale of Presley's management contract to a group on the West Coast due to Parker's "poor health and financial problems". The article in the Nashville Banner suggested that Parker had a large gambling debt and that the manager and singer had not spoken in two years. Presley's road manager, Joe Esposito, also denied claims of Parker's debts and his strained relationship with Presley. Parker assured The Tennessean from a tour stop in St. Paul, Minnesota, that he was in town working with Presley and that the story was a "complete fabrication".

Presley's personal finances were also in distress. The singer owned two jets that had crews on permanent call: a 1958 Convair 880 and a 1962 Lockheed JetStar. The yearly cost of the crews amounted to US$250,000 (equivalent to $1,410,000 in 2025) before flight expenses. By June 1976, Vernon Presley had been trying to sell the JetStar after it had been sitting unused for months while losing value and producing high costs. The singer's father was contacted by Frederick Pro of the Air Cargo Express, Inc. after he became aware of their need to sell. Pro was a con artist also known to the FBI as Alfredo Proc, president of the New York City-based Trident Consortium and the England-based Seven Oaks Finance Ltd. Pro flew to Memphis with two other associates for a meeting with Vernon Presley: the scammers offered a business plan that entailed having the plane re-fitted to comply with the newest version of the Federal Aviation Regulation Part 121 and then to sub-lease the plane under Presley's name. Pro would help the Presleys take a loan from a New York bank to pay the original purchase loan of the aircraft and cover the cost of the refitting. Additionally, he offered to pay Presley a signing bonus of US$40,000 (equivalent to $213,000 in 2025). With the sub-lease of the plane, Presley would keep the aircraft and receive US$1,000 (equivalent to $5,000 in 2025) monthly. The Chemical Bank of New York agreed to finance the plane because of Presley's name, and they gave the singer US$950,000 (equivalent to $5,047,000 in 2025) to repay the original plane purchase loan to Memphis's National Bank of Commerce and to finance the improvements. Vernon Presley never received the signing premium offered by Pro. By October, Presley had not received any payments for the sub-lease, and he was out of an additional US$400,000 (equivalent to $2,125,000 in 2025) in cashier's checks that the scammer's team cashed from Vernon Presley. The singer then called his attorney, Beecher Smith, who contacted the local Assistant U.S. Attorney, who in turn brought the Memphis FBI office into the case. While the investigation was in progress, the FBI attached two undercover agents for Presley's protection to his road crew, and the number of security guards used for his live appearances increased.

== Production ==
Parker reached a deal with CBS for a new television special featuring Presley: the network offered the manager US$750,000 (equivalent to $3,980,000 in 2025). Parker applied the new deal he had reached with Presley the year before for the first time: while US$10,000 would be allocated to the promotion of the show, the rest of the earnings were to be divided 50-50 in full partnership between the manager and singer, as well as the ownership of the special following its first airing. In late May 1977, it was announced that Presley would appear in the new CBS special. Initial reports indicated that the one-hour concert would be filmed during Presley's summer tour in two cities and would also feature behind-the-scenes footage. Parker's announcement came as a surprise to Presley's musicians and entourage, given the performer's worsening condition, as they felt he could not be filmed up-close. Additionally, Presley's mood at the start of the tour was negatively affected by the publication of promotional excerpts from Elvis: What Happened?, while his manager argued that the rumors would help sell tickets. Parker offered different explanations as to why he agreed to the special, including that Presley needed a challenge and that the singer had asked him to do it. Later Parker also explained that he felt that CBS would turn down the large figure he wanted from the network and that their acceptance of it compelled him to go through with the deal. Director Dwight Hemion and producer Gary Smith were commissioned by CBS to produce the one-hour special entitled Elvis in Concert. The team hired Danish director Annett Wolf to capture the behind-the-scenes footage featuring Presley.

In mid-June, it was announced that out of the dates of the tour, Rapid City, South Dakota, and Omaha, Nebraska, were selected as the filming locations for the special. According to CBS operations engineer Martin J. Murphy, the network selected both locations due to the similarity of their arenas and their geographical proximity. The concert in Omaha was to be held on Sunday, June 19, while the Rapid City concert would take place the following Tuesday. Murphy further stressed the logistical complexity: while Presley performed similar sets in all of his shows, the crew would have to adapt the concert for television without disturbing the live audience. The network had to install special lighting for the shows, and their crew consisted of 35 technicians who operated four videotape machines, seven cameras, and the sound equipment. Additionally, Presley traveled with a crew of 70 people. Presley appeared in both concerts wearing his Aztec-themed jumpsuit, his one costume that fit him properly.

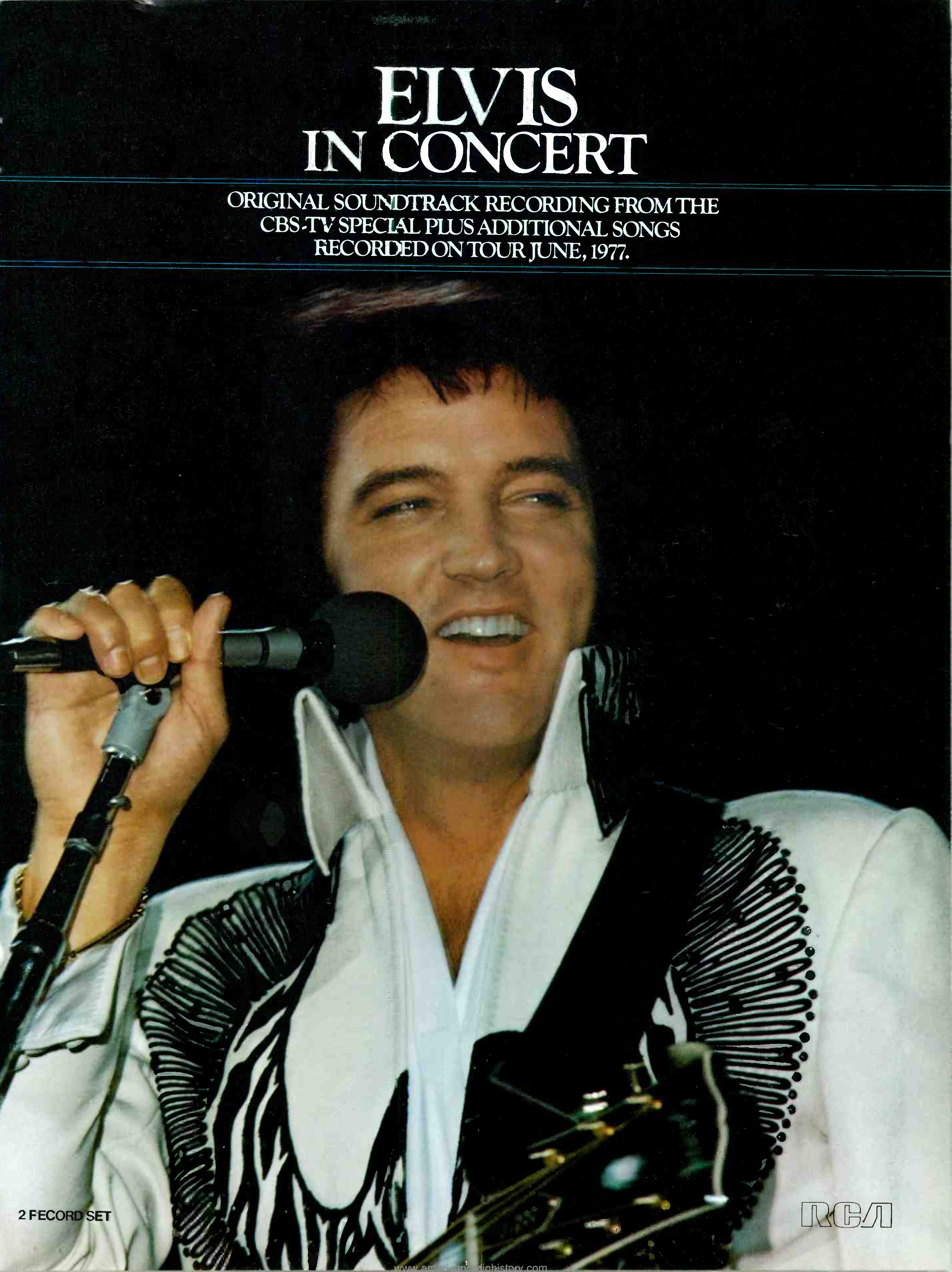
Advertising for the soundtrack of Elvis in Concert published in 1977

In Omaha, Presley played at the Omaha City Auditorium for an audience of 10,604. While the security detail included 26 guards, City Auditorium manager Charlie Mancuso told the Omaha World-Herald that he did not need to provide accommodation or a green room for Presley since the singer prepared for his shows in his private jet. The newspaper also reported that the access of its reporting staff was restricted by Presley's crew while the CBS staff was allowed to move freely. Local critic Steve Millburg opened his review of the concert by describing Presley's weight gain and his limited motions in contrast to the singer's younger self. Millburg felt that Presley still had "an awful lot to offer": the critic praised his performance of gospel numbers and what he described as the "awesome power of his voice", and he described his stage presence as "supremely confident". Millburg closed the piece noting the issues caused by the television crew: while members of the audience had to move when their view was obstructed, the lights installed by CBS would blink at "odd and distracting intervals". Presley's biographer Peter Guralnick opined that the singer's performance in Omaha "exceeded everyone's worst fears" and that "panic" seemed to have "overtaken" him, and that his voice became "unrecognizable". He expanded that the show was "unbearable to listen or to watch", as the memory of Presley's previous performances was now replaced by "sheer, stark terror". Presley apologized to Smith and Hemion for his poor performance, and he assured the team two nights later in Rapid City that he would compensate for it with his new appearance. Smith did not expect a good performance from Presley; instead, he wanted to capture the crowd's support of the singer despite his condition.

In Rapid City, the event marked the inauguration of the Rushmore Plaza Civic Center. The 10,100 tickets sold out within a week of the announcement at US$15 each (equivalent to $79.7 in 2025). The show opened with comedian Jackie Kahane, followed by J.D. Sumner & the Stamps Quartet, and then The Sweet Inspirations prior to the intermission. Backstage, before the start of the concert, Presley was given a commemorative plaque for the opening of the stadium by mayor Arthur Lacroix. Local critic Jeri Gulbransen also noted that Presley moved less, but that his voice "sounded even better in person" than in his recordings. Gulbransen closed, stating that while the singer's "detractors may call Elvis aging and fat", Presley still filled arenas, as she declared: "He's the king." Guralnick later wrote that Presley appeared healthier at the concert and that he sounded better, while he remarked that his performance of "Unchained Melody" would "ultimately prove too raw for network broadcast", as Presley "seemed to invest every fiber of his being" into the song.

The tour continued until the last show planned before a pause until August: Presley's appearance in Indianapolis, on June 26, 1977, became his last concert. On August 16, 1977, Presley died at his home, Graceland, at the age of 42. For the special, the producers could only use three songs from Presley's appearance in Omaha, and the show was completed with the takes from Rapid City. The final scene featured Vernon Presley surrounded by fan mail, as he thanked the audience for their continued support of the Presley family. Gary Smith told The Tennessean that on account of Presley's death, the team considered speeding up the editing of the program, but they decided to release it on the originally scheduled date in October. In the interview, Smith denied having issues with Presley while filming, and he also denied the rumors of a strained relationship between the singer and Parker. According to Smith, the scene with Vernon Presley was filmed in September 1977, shortly before the final edit of the show. In a 2018 interview, Knoxville producer Ross Bagwell suggested that Smith contacted him soon after he learned of the news of Presley's death. On Bagwell's account, Smith sent him to Graceland to film the closing scene with Vernon Presley. As it was still too early for condolence letters to start arriving, the production team stacked around the singer's father fan letters that were already present at the mansion while Presley was still alive.

== Release and reception ==
In September 1977, Elvis in Concert was shown to the press in a pre-release function in New York City by CBS. On October 1, Billboard reported that the final edit of the special was still unfinished at the time of the showing and would include 13 to 15 songs. The piece mentioned the upcoming release of the soundtrack album for the yet unreleased special, while it also informed of RCA Records' difficulties in meeting the high demand for pressing records of previous titles from the Presley catalog. CBS premiered the special on October 3, 1977. It became Presley's third television special. The Associated Press later announced that the show became the most-viewed program that week with a share of 33 points that represented 24.1 million viewers.

=== Critical reception ===
The New York Times delivered a negative review of the show: critic John J. O'Connor expressed that while he saw the program from a dispassionate point of view, he felt that depending on where the viewers placed on what he called the "Elvis-adulation scale" the result was either a "moving tribute" or a "social satire". O'Connor elaborated that he saw Presley as "fat and puffy" and "almost a grotesque parody of his former self". He continued describing his condition as "pathetic and infinitely sad", and he likened Presley to an "aging stripper in a seedy burlesque house". Meanwhile, O'Connor remarked on the support of Presley's fans, and he called them "ardent". Meanwhile, Kay Gardella wrote for the New York Daily News that Presley was "paying the price" for the "way of life" she considered the singer expressed in his rendition of the "touching ballad" "My Way", while she deemed Presley's appearance a "charismatic performance".

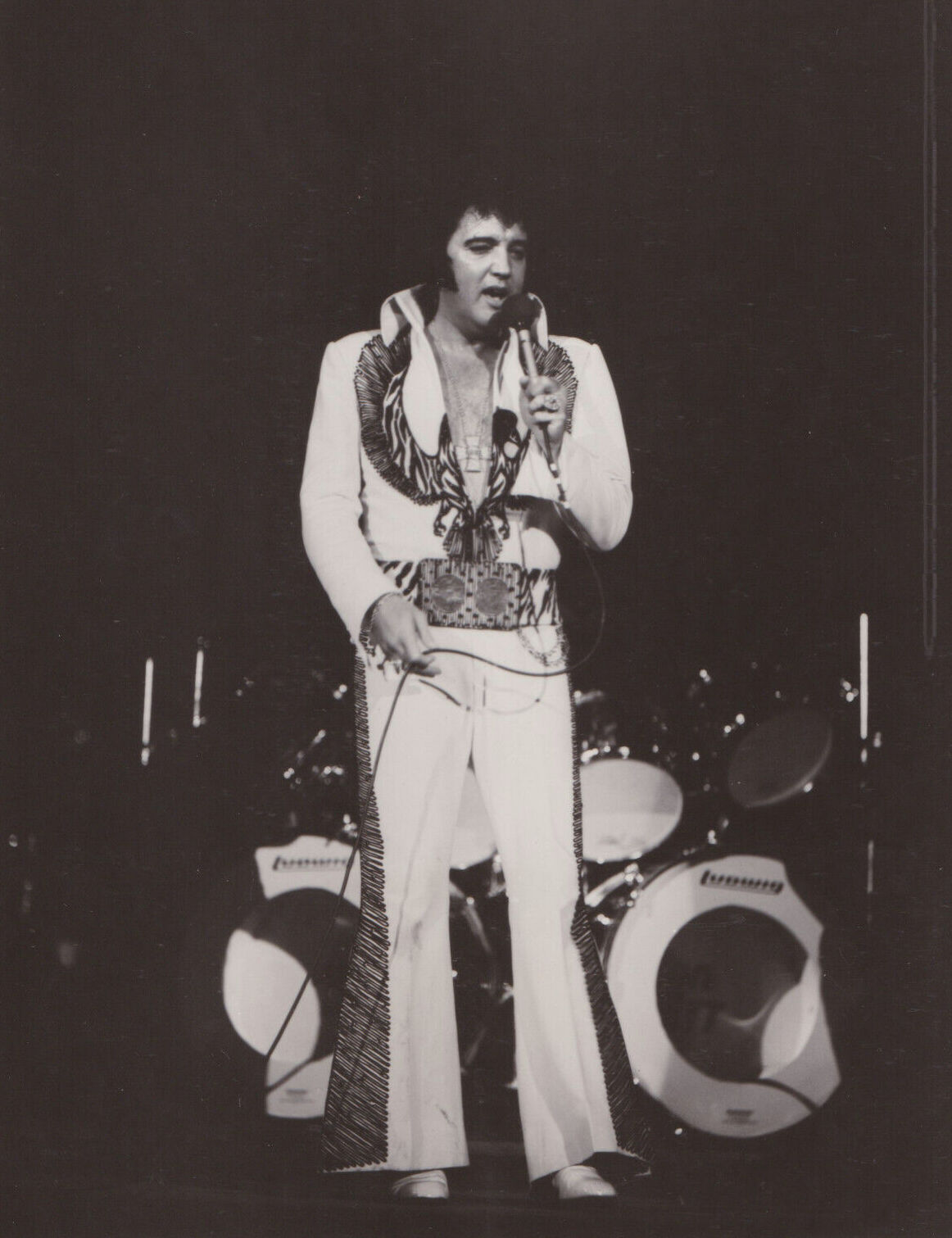
Presley performing in 1976

For the Los Angeles Times, critic Robert Hilburn characterized the special as a "mercilessly strong viewing", and he considered that the program could not have "escaped depressing undercurrents" on the occasion of Presley's recent death. Hilburn expressed that the performance was "rarely distinguished" and he noted that while Presley did "exhibit vocal spark", his concerts in recent years had been "noticeably subpar". The critic saw the "puffy and overweight" singer as "only a fraction of his once-dynamic self". Hilburn considered the presentation similar in concept to the documentaries Elvis on Tour and Elvis: That's the Way It Is, and that Hemion and Smith could have added footage of Presley's early career to soften the "depressing edge", but that it would not "fit" the original concept for the special. The writer noted in the piece that he could not understand Parker's motivation to show Presley in that condition, while he remarked on the "unabashed adoration" of the fans. Hilburn concluded that the original broadcast may have been the only opportunity to see the program, as he felt that it would not be shown again in future tributes to Presley. Meanwhile, Memphis Press-Scimitar compared Presley's appearance on his final performance tour with his appearance in Loving You, which was aired on October 2, 1977, on NBC, as the reviewer felt that success had in him "a force as powerful and almost as destructive as a tornado". The writer remarked that the special showed "the toll the pressures in his own career were taking".

The review of the Chicago Tribune felt that, despite all the discussion surrounding Presley's weight at the time of his death, it still was a "shock" to see him "so bloated" that it made him look like former impersonator Conway Twitty. The piece determined that the show gave "everything that is wonderful and awful" of Presley in his final tour. Christine Brown wrote for the Miami Herald that following Presley's death, Elvis in Concert had a "certain historical significance". Brown commented on Presley's degraded physical appearance, while she remarked that Presley was still "strikingly handsome in profile". About his singing, the critic felt that Presley was not "anything special" when he did not try, but that when he brought his talent to a song, he was "peerless". Brown felt that Vernon Presley's closing of the show with saying "Thank You; God bless you" was a "fitting goodbye to the fans, and to the King". In his report for the San Francisco Examiner, writer Bill Mandel ascribed Presley's "larger than life" image to the singer's reluctance to give interviews during his lifetime. He continued with his opinion that television had "eroded" the "specialness of famous people"; at the same time, he compared Presley with the Pope and Queen Elizabeth as the only prominent figures who did not appear on a regular basis. Mandel expressed that while the production was "smooth and professional", the special made Presley "stand fat and naked". He perceived that the musical part "comes across quite well", while he categorized Elvis in Concert as a "social document" and a "portrait of a legend turning to clay".

=== Legacy ===
The soundtrack of the special, Elvis in Concert, was released on October 10, 1977, as a double LP with three additional songs recorded in concert in June 1977. The closing track included Vernon Presley's special message. The release topped Billboard's Top Country Albums, and his single "My Way" became a top-ten country single. Due to the success of the original broadcast in the United States, CBS aired it once again on May 7, 1978. BBC broadcast the special on June 19, 1978. Footage of the program was used for the 1981 documentary This is Elvis, and clips appeared on the 1990 home video release Elvis: The Great Performances.

In 1986, sound engineer Wade Williams announced that he would put up for sale an original black-and-white four-and-a-half-hour footage of Elvis in Concert that had been in his possession since he worked on the making of the show in 1977. Williams owned a sound truck that CBS hired for the recording of the special: the network provided Williams with the black-and-white feed to the truck so that the engineer could see what was happening on stage as he recorded. Williams told Robert Hilburn that Elvis Presley Enterprises approved of the sale, for which Williams wanted US$500,000 (equivalent to $1,470,000 in 2025). Hilburn noted that Williams's tapes had the raw footage of the show in its full length, while the final one-hour edit heavily relied on fan interviews to compensate for "Presley's performance and appearance", which the critic called "disappointing". Hilburn added that while Presley's estate owned the color full-length recordings, representatives said that there were no plans to release the material at the time. Williams added that his footage featured two-and-a-half hours of Presley performing, half an hour backstage, and an hour of the opening acts. Through a television producer, Williams had made attempts to work with Elvis Presley Enterprises to release it on home video, but his request was denied. Representative Joe Rascoff authorized the sale of Williams's personal copy with the condition that the buyer would not use it for television broadcasts or home video releases. Williams later commented that the estate intended for Presley to be remembered "the way he was in the '50s and '60s", as opposed to the end of his life.

In 2004, writer Joseph A. Tunzi noted that to release the special in home media, the publishers would need to set aside their concerns as to "how the public has responded in the past" to Presley's late-career image. Tunzi felt that the program featured "some truly great performances" that justified a release despite the "fear and shame" generated by Presley's appearance. In a review, AllMusic called it Presley's worst release, saying, "it's hard to believe that CBS-TV actually would have aired the show if Presley hadn't died two months later".

In 2011, Elvis Presley Enterprises sued Joseph Pirzada and Bud Glass Productions of England and the United States, respectively, for the use of Elvis in Concert on the bootleg box set The Final Curtain. In 2022, the footage of the performance of "Unchained Melody" was featured by director Baz Luhrmann in the closing scene of the film Elvis. The director noted to Rolling Stone that the footage of Elvis in Concert was difficult to watch and that while the singer's body "is corrupted in 1977", his "spirit and voice actually soars". In 2026, Daily Express noted that Elvis in Concert was still not available on home media. Elvis Presley Enterprises commented that a release of the concert was not planned because the singer was "far from his best in the way he looked and the way he performed", while the estate added that there were "some truly brilliant moments in the footage".

== Tracks ==
Elvis in Concert
No.	Title	Writer(s)	Date / Location	Length
1.	"Stage setup and pre-show souvenir sales / Opening Riff"		June 19, 1977 / Omaha, Nebraska	6:43
2.	"Also Sprach Zarathustra / See See Rider"	Richard Strauss / Ma Rainey, Lena Arant	June 21, 1977 / Rapid City, South Dakota	4:37
3.	"That's All Right"	Arthur "Big Boy" Crudup	June 21, 1977 / Rapid City, South Dakota	2:45
4.	"Are You Lonesome Tonight?"	Roy Turk, Lou Handman	June 21, 1977 / Rapid City, South Dakota	3:01
5.	"Teddy Bear/Don't Be Cruel"	Kal Mann, Bernie Lowe / Otis Blackwell	June 19, 1977 / Omaha, Nebraska	2:11
6.	"Fan Comments (Pt. 2)"		June 21, 1977 / Rapid City, South Dakota	0:42
7.	"You Gave Me a Mountain"	Marty Robbins	June 21, 1977 / Rapid City, South Dakota	3:23
8.	"Jailhouse Rock"	Jerry Leiber and Mike Stoller	June 21, 1977 / Rapid City, South Dakota	1:34
9.	"Fan Comments (Pt. 3)"		June 21, 1977 / Rapid City, South Dakota	0:30
10.	"How Great Thou Art"	Carl Boberg, Stuart K. Hine	June 19, 1977 / Omaha, Nebraska	3:18
11.	"Early Morning Rain"	Gordon Lightfoot	June 21, 1977 / Rapid City, South Dakota	1:48
12.	"Fan Comments (Pt. 4)"		June 21, 1977 / Rapid City, South Dakota	0:48
13.	"I Really Don't Want To Know"	Don Robertson, Howard Barnes	June 21, 1977 / Rapid City, South Dakota	1:32
14.	"Vernon Presley introduction"		June 21, 1977 / Rapid City, South Dakota	0:47
15.	"Hurt"	Roy Hamilton	June 21, 1977 / Rapid City, South Dakota	2:02
16.	"Hound Dog"	Jerry Leiber and Mike Stoller	June 21, 1977 / Rapid City, South Dakota	1:29
17.	"My Way"	Jacques Revaux, Gilles Thibaut, Claude François, Paul Anka	June 21, 1977 / Rapid City, South Dakota	4:07
18.	"Can't Help Falling in Love / Interview with Vernon Presley"	Hugo Peretti, Luigi Creatore, and George David Weiss	June 19, 1977 / Omaha, Nebraska	4:25
19.	"Closing Riff"		June 19, 1977 / Omaha, Nebraska	1:53
20.	"Special Message From Vernon Presley / Closing credits"		1977 / Graceland, Memphis, Tennessee	2:32
Total length:				50:07

== See also ==
- List of television shows notable for negative reception

== Footnotes ==
=== References ===
- "CBS to tape Presley's Rapid City appearance". Rapid City Journal. Vol. 99, no. 30479. June 17, 1977 – via Newspapers.com.
- Elvis – The Great Performances. RCA. 1990. 2227-4-R (VHS).
- "CBS to tape Presley at Rapid City show". Argus Leader. Vol. 92, no. 170. Sioux Falls, South Dakota. Associated Press. June 20, 1977 – via Newspapers.com.
- "RCA shipping 'Elvis in Concert' From TV special" (PDF). Cashbox. Vol. 39, no. 29. October 8, 1977. Archived from the original (PDF) on May 14, 2026 – via WorldRadioHistory.com.
- "'Elvis in Concert' Leads TV for the week". Amarillo Globe-Times. Vol. 54, no. 159. Associated Press. October 12, 1977 – via Newspapers.com.
- Bego, Mark (1988). TV Rock. PaperJacks. ISBN 978-0-770-10982-0 – via Archive.org. (account required)
- Brown, Christine (October 3, 1977). "'Elvis in Concert' -- It is Special". Miami Herald. Vol. 67, no. 307 – via Newspapers.com.
- Claypool, Bob (August 29, 1976). "Music: Elvis Presley". Houston Post. Vol. 92 – via Newspapers.com.
- Connolly, Ray (2018). Being Elvis: A Lonely Life. Liveright. ISBN 978-1-474-60458-1.
- Crossan, Rob (November 14, 2024). "Tom Parker: The scandalous story of Elvis Presley and the illegal Dutchman". Luxury London.
- Deeb, Gary (October 3, 1977). "Elvis: Wonderful and Awful". Chicago Tribune. Vol. 131, no. 276 – via Newspapers.com.
- Doll, Susan (2009). Elvis for Dummies. Wiley. ISBN 978-0-470-56208-6.
- Eipper, Laura (April 30, 1977). "Manager Denies Any Plans to Sell Presley". The Tennessean. Vol. 72, no. 22 – via Newspapers.com.
- Elvis Presley Enterprises v. Bud Glass Productions, 4:11 -cv-00050RH-WCS (N.D. Fla. 2011), archived from the original on May 16, 2026.
- Forde, Eamonn (August 4, 2025). "'Who was going to carry Elvis's drugs and guns?' How Colonel Tom Parker always looked out for the King". The Guardian.
- Gardella, Kay (April 28, 1977). "CBS Sprinkles Star Dust". New York Daily News. Vol. 58, no. 287 – via Newspapers.com.
- Gardella, Kay 2 (October 3, 1977). "Elvis & 'the Good Old Days'". New York Daily News. Vol. 59, no. 85 – via Newspapers.com.
- Glassman, Judith (1978). The year in music 1978. Columbia House. ISBN 978-0-517-53346-8 – via Archive.org. (account required)
- Gold, Aaron (October 3, 1977). "Tower Ticker". Chicago Tribune. Vol. 131, no. 276 – via Newspapers.com.
- Greene, Andy (February 10, 2026). "'EPiC' Delivers Elvis in Concert — And in His Own Words". Rolling Stone.
- Grove, Martin (1978). Elvis: the legend lives!. Manor Books. ISBN 978-053-219197-1 – via Newspapers.com. (account required)
- Gulbransen, Jeri (June 19, 1977). "Civic center scene of flurry of activity as workmen prepare for Presley concert". Rapid City Journal. Vol. 99, no. 30481 – via Newspapers.com.
- Gulbransen, Jeri 2 (June 22, 1977). "There's no doubt about it--Elvis is still 'king'". Rapid City Journal. Vol. 99, no. 30484 – via Newspapers.com.
- Guralnick, Peter (1999). Careless Love: The Unmaking of Elvis Presley. Little, Brown and Company. ISBN 978-0-31620672-3.
- Hatzigiannis, Marielena (February 14, 2011). "Elvis Presley Enterprises Sues for Copyright Infringement". CBS News.
- Higginbotham, Adam (August 11, 2002). "Doctor Feelgood". The Observer. Archived from the original on September 22, 2017.
- Hilburn, Robert (October 3, 1977). "'Elvis in Concert', June 1977". Los Angeles Times. Vol. 96, no. 304 – via Newspapers.com.
- Hilburn, Robert (May 27, 1986). "He's Hoping to Cash in on Elvis' Last Concerts". Los Angeles Times. Vol. 105, no. 175 – via Newspapers.com.
- Hopkins, Jerry (2007). Elvis : a biography. ISBN 978-0-446-79971-3 – via Archive.org. (account required)
- King, Larry (June 20, 1977). "Elvis Staged Amid Extra Security". Omaha World-Herald. Vol. 112, no. 236 – via Newspapers.com.
- Lee, Mary Ann (October 3, 1977). "Elvis' Last Special". Memphis Press-Scimitar. Vol. 97, no. 283 – via Newspapers.com.
- Mandel, Bill (October 3, 1977). "Putting warts on Elvis". San Francisco Examiner. Vol. 113, no. 98 – via Newspapers.com.
- Millburg, Steve (June 20, 1977). "Elvis Has Mellowed, But He's Still King". Omaha World-Herald. Vol. 112, no. 236 – via Newspapers.com.
- Nash, Alanna (2014). The Colonel: The Extraordinary Story of Colonel Tom Parker and Elvis Presley. Simon & Schuster. ISBN 978-1-451-61357-5.
- O'Connor, John J. (October 3, 1977). "TV: 'Elvis,' a Grotesque Parody". The New York Times. Vol. 127, no. 43, 717 – via ProQuest. (subscription required)
- Parker, John (1993). "Elvis: The Secret Files". Trafalgar Square. ISBN 978-185-470039-1 – via Archive.org. (account required)
- Ruhlmann, William (2012). "Elvis in Concert Review". AllMusic.
- Scott, Vernon (June 12, 1977). "Elvis Featured on CBS Special". The Tampa Tribune and Tampa Bay Times. Vol. 11, no. 24. United Press International – via Newspapers.com.
- Simpson, George (February 28, 2026). "Elvis 1977 final shows 'horrifying to watch' confessed ex Linda Thompson". Daily Express.
- Terrance, Vincent (2013). Television Specials: 5,336 Entertainment Programs, 1936–2012. McFarland. ISBN 978-1-476-61240-9.
- Solt, Andrew (1981). This is Elvis. Warner Bros. B07KM3HD7Y (DVD).
- Torgoff, Martin (1982). The Complete Elvis. Delilah Books. ISBN 978-0-933-32828-0 – via Newspapers.com. (account required)
- Traiman, Stephen (October 1, 1977). "RCA 'Elvis in Concert' Set Due" (PDF). Billboard. Vol. 89, no. 39. Archived from the original (PDF) on February 10, 2026 – via WorldRadioHistory.com.
- Tunzi, Joseph A. (2004). Elvis sessions III : the recorded music of Elvis Aron Presley, 1953-1977. JAT Publishing. ISBN 978-1-888-46410-8 – via Archive.org. (account required)
- Tyler, David (August 2017). "Remembering Elvis Presley 40 years later" (Interview). CTV Atlantic News – via YouTube.
- Venerable, Sam (August 12, 2018). "The story was told by a set of dirty dishes". Knoxville News Sentinel. Vol. 92, no. 265 – via Newspapers.com.
- Wyatt, Eugene (October 3, 1977). "Did Elvis Had a Premonition?". The Tennessean. Vol. 72, no. 178 – via Newspapers.com.
