= BritWeek =

American nonprofit organization

BritWeek is a 501(c)(3) organization based in Los Angeles, California. It was founded by So You Think You Can Dance and American Idol producer Nigel Lythgoe, the former British Consul-General in Los Angeles Bob Peirce, Simon Wright and Paul J Wright Esq who serves as its General Counsel. Peirce is the Chairman of BritWeek Inc and Lythgoe is the President. Other board members are Fiona François, Mike Krycler, Sharon Harroun Peirce, Barry Waldo, and Neil Stiles. The Executive Director is Lauren Stone.

BritWeek is primarily known for its annual program of events held in Los Angeles and Orange County each year. The first BritWeek was in 2007. The events are held annually every Spring from late April to early May. The BritWeek program offers a series of events representing British connections with California in British film, British music, British comedy, fashion, British cuisine, luxury goods, sports, and science.

In 2013 BritWeek introduced a Robertson Shopping Stroll, along Robertson Boulevard in Los Angeles. Shops offer discounts and promotions. In 2014 actress Mischa Barton was ambassador for the event.
