= Wot Cheor Geordie =

- Genre: Variety
- Running time: 30 minutes
- Country of origin: United Kingdom
- Language: English - Geordie dialect
- Home station: BBC
- Starring: Varying week by week
- Original release: Early 1940s
- Opening theme: "Whereivvor ye gan ye’re sure te find a Geordie"
- Ending theme: "Whereivvor ye gan ye’re sure te find a Geordie"

Wot Cheor Geordie is an early attempt by the BBC to produce a radio variety programme broadcast from Regional Studios and in a local dialect. Wot Cheor is a greeting in Geordie dialect.

== The show ==
Wot Cheor Geordie was a radio variety programme broadcast from the BBC Regional Studios in Newcastle. It began in the early 1940s and continued until 1956. It featured songs, plays and sketches, all in dialect; some were only moderately successful, while others were considered outstanding. Generally, the programme was a great success.

In 1948 the programme title was included under the "variety" category in the BBC publicity file and it this fact brought it to the notice of London, who requested a recording. A tape was sent from Newcastle with an assurance that the dialect would be toned down and this could be done without losing its humour.

Prior to this, in the 1930s the BBC attempted to expand into the regions by using local materials and local dialects (but very carefully and gently). The North East of England was no exception, and on 9 June 1937 a sketch was broadcast. It utilised the fictitious character "Geordie Marley" who had been created by Newcastle comic writer Captain Walter Dierecx. The sketch was as follows:

Programme announcer: This is the Northern Programme. Here’s a tale about the day the Marleys spent going to the place where the Blaydon Races were run. The famous races that the song was written about were held seventy-five years ago today

Marley: (after humming the concluding bars) Hillo!, ah’ll back ye knaa wat the tune is? Ay hinnies, "Blaydon Races", Tyneside’s National Anthem. Did any owlder folk ivor gan te the Blaydon Races? Ah ownly went theor wance, an’ that was the day the ninth o’ June, an’ it wes some race an’ all mind ye. Ah’ll tell ye aboot it"

== Programme regulars ==
The cast of entertainers, writers etc. varied from week to week. These are some of the regulars:

- In 1948 Leonard Barras sent a sketch for consideration, was immediately accepted and became as regular writer.
- Jack Robson, an Annitsford, (Northumberland born schoolmaster who wrote many songs, many of which were written for, or used in, the programme. He is responsible for "Whereivvor ye gan ye’re sure te find a Geordie" which became the show’s signature tune.
- Norman Turnbull was a regular source of material for the show.
- In the 1950s Bobby Thompson, known as "The Little Waster" was introduced to the programme and was a great success from the beginning. He has been describes as the "Tyneside Al Read" but this is unfair as both men developed independently. He appeared fairly regularly on the programme informing the audience of his wife, debt and the dole.
- The Northumberland Serenaders and the Willie Walker Band became famous and appreciated as far away as London.
- The Five Smith Brothers, who opened the act with "Hello, hello, hello, hello, hello. (with each brother singing, each one going higher up the scale and the last one a much longer note) This is Mr & Mrs Smith’s five little boys, who are saying to you …..". They appeared on the Royal Variety Performance Shows of 1950 and 1955.
- Esther McCracken introduced the programme for many years.

== Legacy ==
The programme was inspiration for Jez Lowe's album Wotcheor!

== See also ==
- Geordie dialect words
