= The Hoppings =

Annual travelling funfair held on the Town Moor in Newcastle upon Tyne, England

Coordinates: 54.992°N 1.633°W

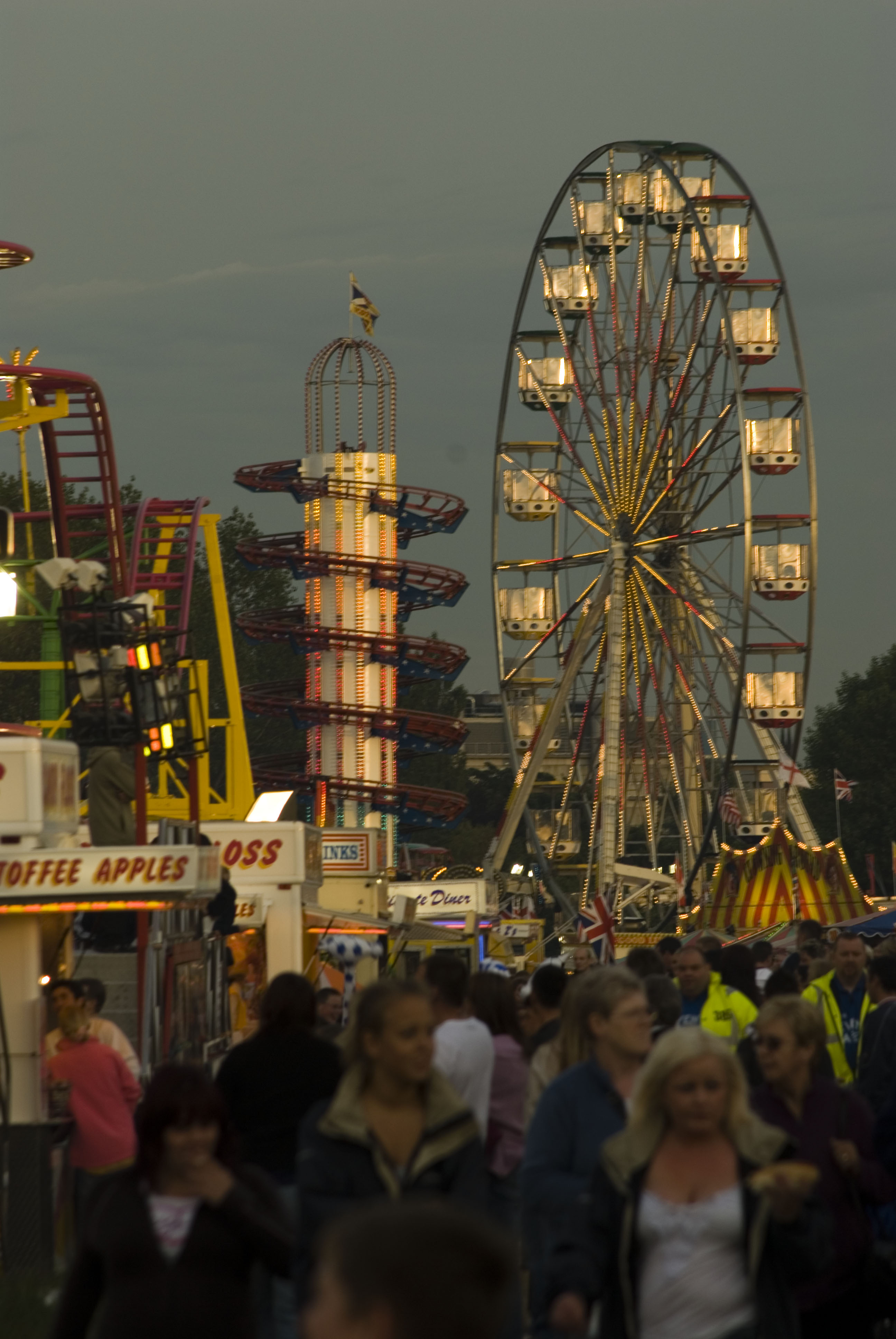
The Hoppings in 2006

The Hoppings is an annual travelling funfair held on the Town Moor in Newcastle upon Tyne, during the last week in June. It is one of Europe's largest travelling funfairs. In recent years, over the course of the nine days it is held, it regularly attracts around 300,000 visitors.

== Origins ==
'Hoppings' was a word for an annual mediaeval fair usually held at Whitsuntide. Writing in 1828, Parson and White explain that: 'Hopping, in Durham and Northumberland, is a local term signifying a feast, merry-meeting, dancing or parish wake'. In the 19thc. 'Hoppings' were also held in Blaydon, Swalwell, Gateshead Windmill Hills and Winlaton.

Several origins have been suggested for the word, most of which relate to dancing. The name may simply derive from the Middle English word "hoppen" meaning to dance, hop, leap, bound or bounce. Another idea stems from the clothing which the travellers used to wear; that being of old, sack-like tops and pants. Clothing often became infested with fleas from the animals that travelled with the fair. People were often seen "jumping" or "hopping" about itching from the bites which they received.

The modern fair began as a Temperance Fair in 1882. However it continues the tradition of several much older fairs held on the Town Moor, The Lammas Fair (1 August, from 1218), The Cow Hill Fair (18 October, from 1490) and Race Week (from 1721) during which the Northumberland Plate was awarded from 1833. From 1751 Race Week was held in the week closest to Midsummer.

Race Week was accompanied by hundreds of booths, tents and stalls, and when the horse races moved to Gosforth Park Racecourse in 1882, the Newcastle Temperance Festival took over both the Town Moor site and the late June date. The organisers wanted to provide local people, especially the pitmen, with an alternative to drinking and gambling at the horse races. The first Hoppings held in 1882 included the familiar stalls and fairground rides, but also putting the shot, running races, pole leaping, triple jump, running jump, tug-of-war, bar vaulting, bicycle races and skipping competitions for children.

In 1908 a fountain was erected at the top of Forsyth Road Jesmond in memory of Alderman William Davies Stephens who, as chairman of the Temperance Festival Association, had led the move to establish the Hoppings.

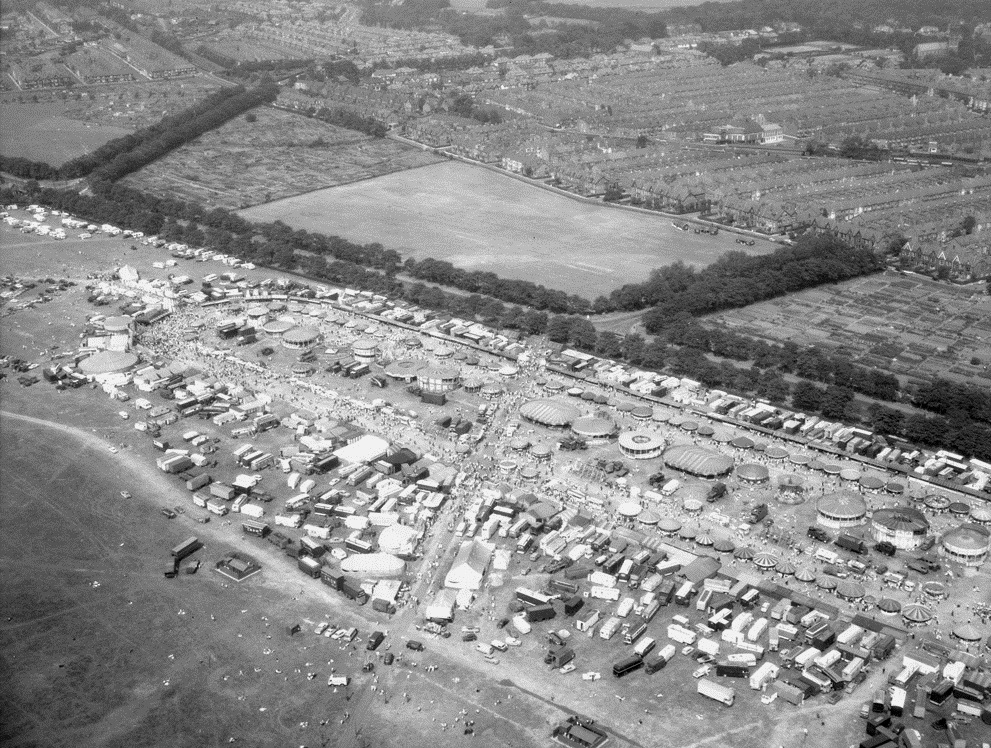
Aerial view of the Hoppings in 1960

The fair took place at Jesmond Dene from 1914 to 1918 and returned to the more spacious Town Moor, just north of the city centre, in 1919. There was no Festival on the Moor between 1920 and 1923, but it returned in June 1924, where it continued annually until 1946; a non-Showmen's Guild Fair was held that year but proved to be unpopular. The Guild showmen returned in 1947 and the Hoppings was a success with a record attendance. In 1959 the Hoppings featured in an amateur short film, viewable at the Yorkshire Film Archive.

== Recent history ==
In 1985, attendance dipped to 100,000 as the recession hit. The Hoppings was even at risk of closing, but after reducing policing costs and increasing the use of the car park, The Hoppings saw a great profit in 1991. To mark the end of The Hoppings that year, a firework display took place.

In 2013 after a dispute between the Showmen's Guild and Newcastle City Council over pitch and rent terms, alternate fairs were held at Nuns Moor Newcastle upon Tyne, Team Valley Gateshead and Herrington Country Park, Sunderland. Newcastle council held an alternate event with "broader appeal" which included a funfair held on the Town Moor. The Hoppings returned to the Town Moor in 2014 after the dispute was resolved.

In 2020, the Hoppings was cancelled due to the COVID-19 pandemic, the decision was taken jointly by Newcastle City Council the Freemen of Newcastle who manage the Moor.

Panorama of The Hoppings, 2006

In 2021 Crow Events took over full management of the event from the Freemen of Newcastle. It was decided to move the date for this year only to the 19 to 30 August to allow for the government's 4-stage plan to ease Covid pandemic restrictions to be successfully rolled out. However the event was eventually cancelled in its entirety. It returned the following year.

In 2024 Crow Events had to reduce the size of the event due to damage to the Gosforth end of the fairground from bad weather in 2023 meaning the Gosforth end of the site needing to be replanted and given time to harden again. 2024 saw rides from the Top and Back of the Gosforth End of the event move to the back row of the site.

== Cultural impact ==
In the 1970s, photographer Sirkka-Liisa Konttinen took a series of black and white images of the Hoppings.

The fairground artist Paul Wright began his career at the Hoppings in the late 1970s, when showman Ronnie Taylor spotted him sketching at the fair and commissioned him to decorate one of his rides.

The Hoppings inspired the song "Katie Was There" by Eric Boswell which was part of his 1983 musical Katie Mulholland, based on Catherine Cookson's novel, staged by Newcastle Playhouse.
