= Paul J. Wright =

English barrister (born 1955)

Paul J. Wright OBE (born February 10, 1955) is an attorney. He was called to the Bar of England and Wales in 1987 and the California Bar in 1990.

== Biography ==
Born in Aylesbury, Buckinghamshire, he studied law at the University of Buckingham before being called to the Bar of England and Wales in 1987.

In 1990, Wright was admitted to The State Bar of California.

Wright was on the faculty of Touro University California (2009–2012). From 2007 to 2008, he was an Instructor, UCLA Extension, Media Ethics and Psychology & the Law. He is extensively consulted on legal matters and has been a speaker in a number of distinguished international forums.

In the 2013 New Year Honours list Wright was awarded the OBE for services to British business interests in the United States.

=== International arbitration, law and legal development ===
In 1994 was certified to arbitrate and mediate international commercial disputes by the International Centers for Arbitration. In 2003, founded the International Mediation and Arbitration Center (IMAC) and was appointed that same year to the ACI (A Commercial Initiative for Dispute Resolution) Panel - London, England. In July 2008, Wright was the sole speaker on "Dispute Resolution in the US" before the Chartered Institute of Arbitrators; Belfast, Northern Ireland. In 2009 he founded International Esq to address cutting edge international legal developments. As a result of that successful launch, formed a joint venture and legal series with Daily Variety.

Wright is the former president of the British American Business Council Los Angeles. He currently serves as its chairman. During his time as president, in 2007 Wright helped organize and moderated the BABC Transatlantic Conference on the Future of the Entertainment and New Media Industries with fifty-one CEOs, politicians and leading speakers drawn from the US and UK addressing subjects ranging from the Future of the Music Industry to the Future of the Internet to the Future of Television and Film. In 2009, Wright founded International Esq and formed an ongoing joint venture with Daily Variety to address cutting edge international legal developments and provide fully accredited Continuing Legal Education programs. Seminars have included "Celebrity Justice & Media Globalization: Why Hollywood Celebrities Flock to the UK Courts" and "The Music Industry's Response to Piracy: Intervention or Innovation?"

==== BritWeek ====
Wright is a member of the board of BritWeek, a Los Angeles, California organization focusing on the British contribution to film, fashion and music in Southern California. Wright serves as BritWeek's general counsel.

== Career ==
=== Educational and professional background ===
- (1985) Buckingham University, England - LLB (Hons)
- (1987) Called to Bar of England and Wales
- (1990) Admitted to The State Bar of California
- (1991) Admitted to United States District Court for the Central District of California
- (1991) Admitted to United States District Court for the Southern District of California
- (2003) Founded International Mediation and Arbitration Center (IMAC)
- (2009) Founded International Esq to address cutting edge international legal developments. As a result of a successful launch, formed a joint venture and legal series with Daily Variety

==== Professional appointments ====
- (1994) Certified to arbitrate and mediate international commercial disputes by the International Centers for Arbitration
- (2005–2007) Appointed president of the British American Business Council, Los Angeles and to the International Board of the BABC
- (2007 to present) Appointed to the BritWeek Board and serves as its General Counsel
- (2007–2008) Instructor, UCLA Extension, Media Ethics and Psychology & The Law
- (2007–2008) Appointed chairman of the British American Business Council, Los Angeles California
- (2009) Appointed to the Faculty of Touro University California (Media and Communications)
- (2010 to 2016) Appointed to the United Kingdom Trade & Investment and BritWeek Committee that selects Nominees for outstanding innovation in design, service provision and technology in the UK/California business communities for its annual Innovation Awards
- (2011 to 2012) Appointed to the now defunct Variety Foundation, Inc. Board and served as its General Counsel
- (2012) Appointed president (second term) of the British American Business Council, Los Angeles California
- (2014) Appointed to the JAMS Ireland Mediation Panel
- (2016 to 2017) Appointed chairman (second term) of the British American Business Council, Los Angeles California

==== Publications and presentations ====
- (April 2004) Mock Mediation before the 15th International Congress of Maritime Arbitrators - London, England.
- (September 2004) co-chair and moderator of State Bar of California, International Law Section and British American Business Council, Los Angeles Conference on "Doing Business in the Expanding European Union". Moderator of Panel on Transatlantic Litigation and Alternative Dispute Resolution – Los Angeles.
- (October 2004) "Alternative Dispute Resolution in the Airline Industry" at the American Bar Association Forum on Air and Space Law, Santa Monica, California, by Paul J. Wright, Esq.
- (November 2004)Sole Speaker, "Developments in International Alternative Dispute Resolution", University of Waseda, Institute of Comparative Law, Tokyo, Japan, by Paul J. Wright, Esq., Published in "Waseda Proceedings of Comparative Law", Volume 7, 2004.
- (January 2005) Presenter, "Mediation in the Motorsports Industry", Autosport International - Birmingham, England.
- (September 2006) Moderator of Public Relations Society of American Panel Discussion "When Litigation Looms…The Role of Public Relations & The Media". The panel included Thomas A. Mesereau, Esq. and Robert Shapiro (lawyer), Los Angeles.
- (July 2008) Organizer and moderator of the 2007 British American Business Council Transatlantic "Future Now" Conference. This two-day conference on the "Future of the Entertainment and New Media Industries" (first day) and "Climate Change, the Future of Renewable Resources and Homeland Security" (second day) featured over 51 speakers/panelists. Los Angeles.
- (July 2008) Sole speaker, "Dispute Resolution in the US" before the Chartered Institute of Arbitrators; Belfast, Northern Ireland.
- (January 2009) Speaker at "Round Table on Libel Tourism"; London School of Economics; London, England. The Round table featured the leading UK and US lawyers in this specialized area.
- (March 2009) Organizer and moderator, "Celebrity Justice & Media Globalization, Why Hollywood Celebrities Flock to the UK Courts" Round Table; Beverly Hills, California.
- (November 2009) Organizer and moderator, "The Music Industry's Response to Piracy: Intervention or Innovation" Round Table, Beverly Hills, California.
- (April 16, 2010) Speaker at Whittier Law School Symposium; "International Mediation"; Whittier, California, April 16, 2010
- (May 4, 2010) Organizer and moderator, British American Business Council Los Angeles, "Young Entrepreneurs Who Are Changing the Face of the World"; Beverly Hills, California.
- (February 11, 2011) Moderator at Whittier Law School Symposium; (Center for International and Comparative Law); "Entertainment & Sports Law: The International Dimension", Whittier, California.
- (July 8, 2011) Originator and co-chair of the Variety Venture Capital & New Media Summit. The Summit was attended by the Duke and Duchess of Cambridge. Beverly Hills, California.
- (April 13, 2012) Moderator at Whittier Law School Symposium; (Center for International and Comparative Law); "Meeting the Challenges of the Chinese Entertainment Market", Whittier, California.
- (June 27, 2012) Co-chair of the Variety Venture Capital & New Media Summit, Beverly Hills, California.
- (September, 2012) Speaker at the Law Society House, "From Belfast to Los Angeles Develop Your Own Unique Practice", Belfast, Northern Ireland.
- (January 9, 2013) Interviewed on KTLA Channel 5 Morning News, after it was announced that Wright was receiving the Most Excellent Order of the British Empire (OBE).
- (June, 2016) Interviewed a number of times about Wright's opinion on Brexit including on KNX 1070, public radio, and other California radio and TV shows.
- (January 18, 2016) Article published in City A.M., a London financial publication concerning the attempt by certain members of Parliament to exclude the U.S. President Elect from the U.K.

==== Professional associations ====
- Los Angeles County Bar Association
- State Bar of California
- Honourable Society of the Inner Temple

==== Order of Chivalry ====
- The Most Excellent Order of the British Empire
