= Paul Wright (fairground artist) =

British fairground airbrush artist (1954–2019)

- Born: 1954
- Died: 20 March 2019 (aged 64–65)
- Citizenship: British
- Education: Newcastle University, Fine Arts
- Known for: Airbrush art, fairground art

Paul Wright (1954 – 20 March 2019) was a British fairground artist and airbrusher, recognized as one of the leading artists in his niche in the late 20th and early 21st centuries. His work decorated appeared on various British fairground rides over multiple decades, and examples are held in the collections of the Fairground Heritage Trust and catalogued on Art UK.

== Career ==
Wright's career began in the late 1970s, using traditional brush painting techniques. He was studying for a degree in Fine Arts at Newcastle University. His work was discovered by showman Ronnie Taylor when he was spotted sketching at the Hoppings, a large travelling fair held annually on Newcastle's Town Moor. Taylor then commissioned decorations for his Rib-Tickler ride, which Wright painted with Star Wars imagery. This marked the beginning of his career on fairground art.

Paul Wright's designs, which were inspired by popular culture, were soon in demand from showmen across the United Kingdom. He decorated a variety of rides, including gallopers, speedways, waltzers, swings, meteorites, Miamis, ghost trains and fun houses.

== Style and technique ==
Wright's work originated in response to the drastic changes of fairground ride art in the late 20th century. Around the late 1980s, thrill rides demanded designs that were more visually impactful than the earlier traditional scroll and lettering work, which now favored busy compositions featuring pop music and cinema imagery. The airbrush was chosen as the perfect tool to meet these demands, as it offered quick execution and a metallic, hyper-realistic finish that bridged the gap between aspirational imagery and the interests of the fairground's audience.

The airbrush allowed Wright to produce highly layered and photo-realistic scenes covering every available surface of a ride, and his mastery of the medium made him one of the most sought-after artists in the field. Author and fairground art historian Nigel Edginton-Vigus, whose book Waltzer (2015) documented British fairground art, named Wright among the defining artists of the contemporary movement alongside DC Slater, Chris Gadd, Joby Carter and Chris Thomas.

Among Wright's most popular works were the decoration of Chadwick's ghost train, Cole's Master Blaster Miami, and David Wallis' Ice Maze. Works by Wright are held in the collection of the Fairground Heritage Trust, including panels from Brett's Ghost Train (early 1980s), John Walter Shaw's Easyrider (1990–1995), and the Thor Power Lightning and Thor Holding Lightning Rods compositions, all of which are catalogued in the Art UK national collection database.

Later in his career Wright also collaborated with the fairground sign and print company ShowmanSigns, with whom he worked as a design partner as he transitioned from hand airbrushing to digital design work.

== Later life ==
Wright retired from airbrush work after being diagnosed with cancer, instead focusing on vinyl design for smaller rides and stalls. He produced designs for other fairground artists to paint until his death on 20 March 2019.

== Archive ==
Wright's professional archive, comprising designs, drawings, research material, correspondence and photographs, principally related to the decoration of Chadwick's Ghost Train, is held at the National Fairground and Circus Archive (NFCA) at the University of Sheffield under the reference NFA0170. Items are available to view by appointment in the NFCA reading room.
