= The Beverley Sisters =

English pop vocal trio

- Born: Joy: 5 May 1924; Babs: 5 May 1927; Teddie: 5 May 1927; Bethnal Green, London, England
- Origin: Bethnal Green, London, England
- Died: Joy: 31 August 2015 (aged 91); Babs: 28 October 2018 (aged 91); Teddie: 17 June 2026 (aged 99)
- Genre: Traditional pop
- Years active: 1944–2000
- Labels: Columbia, Philips, Decca, RCA
- Past members: Joy Beverley; Teddie Beverley; Babs Beverley

The Beverley Sisters were an English female close harmony traditional pop vocal and light entertainment trio, consisting of three sisters from London. They were eldest sister Joy (born Joycelyn Victoria Barbara Chinery; 5 May 1924 (Note: Although many sources give later years for their births, official records show 1924 and 1927, and Joy confirmed her age as 87 in a 2011 interview.) – 31 August 2015), and twins Teddie (born Hazel Pamela Chinery; 5 May 1927 – 17 June 2026) and Babs (born Babette Patricia Chinery; 5 May 1927 – 28 October 2018). The sisters were each appointed MBE in 2006.

The Beverley Sisters were most popular during the 1950s and 1960s, and became well-known through their radio and television appearances. Their style was loosely modelled on that of their American counterparts, The Andrews Sisters. Their notable successes included the Irving Berlin-penned "Sisters" and the Christmas songs "I Saw Mommy Kissing Santa Claus", "Little Donkey", and "Little Drummer Boy", while in the United States, they charted with a version of "Greensleeves". They also toured the cabaret circuit, and were known for their matching outfits, which they wore both on- and off-stage.

== Early lives ==
The sisters were born in Bethnal Green, London, to Victoria Alice (née Miles) (married 1916) and George Arthur Chinery (1894–1962), who were known as the music hall act Coram and Mills, and were related to the Lupino acting and performing family. The eldest, Joy, was born on 4 May 1924; the twins, Babs and Teddie, were born on 5 May 1927. They were evacuated to Northamptonshire during the Second World War and received secretarial training.

== Career ==
During the Second War, the sisters auditioned successfully to take part in an advertising campaign for the malt drink Ovaltine. Jock Ware, photographer for the Ovaltine poster campaign encouraged them to audition for BBC Radio. They did so in November 1944, changing their name to the Beverley Sisters on the advice of BBC producer Cecil Madden, who became their manager. They met Glenn Miller who, shortly before his disappearance, offered them the opportunity to record with members of his orchestra.

They first appeared in radio programmes for the Allied Expeditionary Forces, recorded in Bedford, then followed up on BBC Radio's Variety Bandbox.

Immediately after the war they toured with Eric Winstone and his Orchestra, and began making regular appearances on the BBC's early television programmes. They also performed for NBC in the US with surviving members of the Glenn Miller Orchestra. After their return to Britain, promoter Val Parnell booked them to appear at the London Palladium with Gracie Fields, although Fields refused, without explanation, to appear with them.

The following year they performed with Danny Kaye. The BBC gave them their own television series, initially called Three Little Girls on View, but later renamed as Those Beverley Sisters, which ran for seven years and on which they gave live performances of popular songs of the day.

In 1951, they signed a recording deal with the UK Columbia record label, later moving to the Philips and Decca labels before returning to Columbia in 1960. Their biggest hits on the UK singles chart were versions of "I Saw Mommy Kissing Santa Claus" (no. 6, 1953) and "Little Drummer Boy" (no. 6, 1959), which were both Christmas hits. The Beverley Sisters appeared as themselves in the 1954 British film musical Harmony Lane, directed by Lewis Gilbert and were Record Mirror "cover stars" for the 12 February 1955 issue.

In 1956, their version of the traditional song "Greensleeves", orchestrated by Roland Shaw, became their only US chart hit, reaching no. 41 on the Billboard pop chart. Generally preferring live cabaret and television appearances over recording work, the song "Sisters", written by Irving Berlin and originally recorded in 1954 by Rosemary Clooney and her sister Betty, became their theme song; it has been claimed that Berlin wrote the song for the Beverley Sisters.

The sisters are widely credited as having been the highest paid female entertainers in the UK for more than 20 years. In 1952, 1958 and 1978, they appeared at the Royal Variety Performance. In January 1961, they appeared on the radio show, Desert Island Discs. They also appeared on the television show Stars on Sunday. The trio were the subjects of This Is Your Life in 1969, when they were surprised by Eamonn Andrews. In 1977, they appeared on the BBC TV's long running variety show The Good Old Days.

Their career was revitalised in the 1980s, after their children – who had begun performing together as the Foxes – invited them onstage at the London Hippodrome, encouraged by club owner Peter Stringfellow. A review in The Stage in March 1985 described the Sisters when appearing in Stringfellow's Hippodrome cabaret as "clad in shimmering pink" and said they had "acquired a glamour and universality that only time and experience can produce". The sisters began performing again for British troops, as well as in gay clubs in Britain, and they produced a new album, Sparkle. The Beverley Sisters drew comparison with the Spice Girls in the late 1990s, especially with regard to the marriages of Joy to England footballer Billy Wright and Posh Spice, Victoria to David Beckham.

The Beverley Sisters performed as part of the Queen's Golden Jubilee celebrations in 2002, and toured with Max Bygraves that year, the 50th anniversary of their appearance at the Royal Variety Performance. They also took part in the D-Day 60th anniversary memorial concerts in 2004.

They entered the Guinness World Records in 2002, as the world's longest surviving vocal group without a change in the original line up. As late as 2009, the sisters appeared in concerts and matinee shows in the United Kingdom. They forged links with the Burma Star Association, as well as McCarthy & Stone, where the sisters were invited to open each new housing development designed specifically for retired people. They later fully retired and lived near each other in Barnet.

== Personal lives and honours ==
After a brief early marriage to American musician Roger Carocari (who adopted the surname Carey), later dissolved, Joy married the Wolverhampton Wanderers and England football captain Billy Wright on 28 July 1958 at Poole Register Office, a year before he retired as a player. They were married for 36 years until Wright died of cancer in September 1994. Joy died on 31 August 2015 at the age of 91.

Babs married Scottish dentist James Mitchell in 1963 but the marriage did not last. She suffered a cut forehead and shock when a passenger in a car accident in North Harrow on Boxing Day 1967 and was confined to a Harley Street Nursing Home for at least three weeks. Babs died on 28 October 2018, also at the age of 91.

Teddie was engaged to Alyn Ainsworth, but married the British waterskiing champion Peter Felix, and, subsequently, property developer Donald Cottage in 1973. She died on 17 June 2026, aged 99, and was the last surviving sister.

In the 2006 New Year Honours list the sisters were each appointed an MBE.

== Discography ==
Robert Tredinnick, in the Gramophone Notes column of The Tatler in January 1952, opined the Beverleys were the best sister act on gramophone since the Boswell Sisters in the early 1930s and "have the gift of making their personalities apparent to an unseeing audience".

=== Chart singles ===
Year	Title	UK Singles Chart	US Pop	Label
1953	"I Saw Mommy Kissing Santa Claus"	6	—	Philips
1956	"Willie Can"	23	—	Decca
1956	"Greensleeves"	—	41	London
1957	"I Dreamed"	24	—	Decca
1959	"Little Drummer Boy"	6	—	Decca
1959	"Little Donkey"	14	—	Decca
1960	"Green Fields"	29	—	Columbia

=== Albums ===
- A Date with the Bevs (Philips, 1955)
- The Enchanting Beverley Sisters (Columbia, 1960)
- Those Beverley Sisters (Decca, 1960)
- The World of the Beverley Sisters (Decca, 1961)
- Together (EMI, 1985)
- Sparkle (K-Tel, 1985)
- Sisters, Sisters: An Evening with the Beverley Sisters (Pickwick, 1993)
- Bless 'Em All (Pickwick, 1995)

== See also ==
- List of Decca Records artists
