= Little Donkey =

1959 Christmas carol

Cover of original 1959 edition of sheet music of Little Donkey

Little Donkey is a popular Christmas carol, written by British songwriter Eric Boswell in 1959, which describes the journey by Mary the mother of Jesus to Bethlehem on the donkey of the title.

The first version to chart was by Gracie Fields, followed a fortnight later by The Beverley Sisters, who overtook her in the charts by Christmas, peaking at No 14. A recording by Nina & Frederik reached No. 3 the following Christmas.

The song has also been recorded by Vera Lynn, Aled Jones and many others, and it is a traditional part of the festive season and nativity plays for many young children.

== See also ==
- List of Christmas carols
