= Jack Robson (songwriter) =

John Gair Robson (1885 – 1957) was an English schoolmaster, musician and songwriter. Many of his 40-plus songs are in Geordie dialect. His most famous song must be "Whereivvor ye gan ye’re sure te find a Geordie".

== Early life ==
Robson was born in 1885 in the village of Annitsford, Northumberland. His father was the manager of the local Co-op store.

It is said that Robson composed his first tune, a hymn, at the age of thirteen and he entered it in a local competition, and won himself a prize.

He became a school teacher, teaching first up in north Northumberland, after which he became headmaster at Backworth Board School. Later when Shiremoor Secondary Modern School opened he moved there.

Musically, he was a good pianist/organist with a love of religious music. In the schools in which he taught, he took a special interest in musical performances. He was the organist at St Andrew's Congregational Church, Camden Street, North Shields and later at Backworth Chapel. He was associated with Earsdon Junior Sword Dancers and vice president of Whitley Girls' Choir.

Having a love of the local people/places/dialect, he became an official of Backworth British Legion and of Whitley Bowls Club.

He wrote songs in many areas of interest, prolifically.

Some of his material was used on the famous local interest BBC radio show Wot Cheor Geordie, which ran from the early 1940s until 1956.

Jack Robson died in South Wellfield, Whitley Bay, North Tyneside, Northumberland but now Tyne and Wear in January 1957.

== Works ==
Over 40 of his songs are well known, some nationally, some only regionally.

His many works include :-

- Whereivvor ye gan ye’re sure to find a Geordie
- My Cheviot Hills – beautiful ballad – recording by Thomas Allen (baritone) with Malcolm Martineau (piano) on the album "Songs my father taught me" ref CDA67290
- Cullercoats Bay
- Pot Pies and Puddens
- The Howty, Towty Lass
- The Ha'penny Woods at Bedlington
- Canny Tyneside
- The Puddens That Me Mother Used Te Myek

== See also ==
Geordie dialect words
