= Neil Stiles =

British magazine executive

Neil Stiles is a British magazine executive who is a former CEO of Variety, Inc.

As CEO of Variety, Inc., Stiles was responsible for the global business operations of the Variety franchise including Variety, the former Daily Variety, the former Daily Variety Gotham, and Variety.com. Additionally, he oversaw MarketCast, a provider of market research for the film and television industries.

Stiles began his career as a music industry journalist in the mid-1970s and moved into sales management and publishing management positions throughout the 1980s.

Before joining Variety in 2008, Stiles was the UK Division Managing Director of Variety's parent company, Reed Business Information. Stiles oversaw several online initiatives; he was CEO of eMedia, an online marketing business, and XpertHR, an online human resources tool. In addition, he managed the print and electronic portfolios of Personnel Today, Hairdressers Journal International, Travel Weekly, Commercial Motor, Motor Transport, Truck and Driver and Utility Week. Stiles also served as Chief Revenue Officer and was responsible for pricing consulting internally, as well as launching the division's digital advertising network.

Variety, as with all magazines and newspapers faced challenging times as revenues moved from Paper to online along with the erosion of price. Neil's main focus whilst at Variety was migrating the business model from a Print/Ad based business to a data driven business model. He launched the Variety Conference business, enhanced the Events business and developed a number of data businesses serving entertainment. In 2011 Stiles facilitated the sale of the Variety Group to Penske Media Corporation in 2012.

After moving to Los Angeles in 2008, Stiles was elected to the Board of British Academy of Film and Television Arts Los Angeles. He has also joined the Boards of LA's BEST, an after school enrichment program, and BritWeek, a charitable organization celebrating British contributions to the Los Angeles community. Stiles has judged the One Show Awards, a celebration of product integration within programming, and the LARC Awards, a recognition of innovation within the Los Angeles Urban landscape. He speaks frequently at conferences on the issues of changing revenue models in democratized distribution channels and pricing in the online space.

Stiles left Reed Elsevier to start a consulting firm based on Florida's east coast. Specializing in pricing and online business models. During this time Neil and the team consulted on a wide range of businesses ranging from telecom's to machine language businesses.

In 2017 Neil succumbed to his passion for Brazilian Jiu Jitsu and launched a BJJ school in Lighthouse Point, Florida with Partners Alexandre "Pulga" Pimentel and Craig Haley. The gym is now one of the most successful in south Florida.

Most recently Neil has been advising two companies in the Water sector, Wahaso the USA's leading commercial water harvesting business and Hydro Reserve a new company that cleans industrial waste water saving costs and providing water reuse possibilities.
