= Paul Elbridge Wright =

Paul E. Wright
- Born: June 24, 1931; Haviland, Kansas, US
- Died: June 4, 2017 (aged 85); Bethesda, Maryland, US
- Education: Cal Poly SLO; University of Pennsylvania
- Scientific career
- Fields: Aerospace application of Thermoelectric effect, mechanical engineering
- Workplaces: RCA; GE; Fairchild Industries; Chrysler

Paul Elbridge Wright (June 24, 1931 – June 4, 2017) was an American business executive, engineer and inventor.

While working at Radio Corporation of America (RCA), Wright was instrumental in developing semiconductor devices for thermoelectric cooling and electrical generation on spacecraft, improving early night vision technology, and semi-conductor amplifiers for communication satellites. Later, he served as Senior Vice President of RCA, Chairman and C.O.O. of Fairchild Industries, and Chairman of Chrysler Technologies.

== Early life and education ==
Paul E. Wright was born on 24 June 1931 in Haviland, Kansas to Clifton E. Wright and Mattie Louise (Huff) Wright. Wright has one sister Naomi Wright Landorf, born in 1933. The family moved to Atascadero, California in 1933 and later to Morro Bay.

Wright graduated from San Luis Obispo High School in 1949. In 1950, Wright enlisted in the US Air Force, attaining the rank of staff sergeant. Most of his tour was spent in Newfoundland as a clerk and bookkeeper. He also served on Consolidated PBY Catalina search and rescue aircraft looking for downed planes.

After his honorable discharge from the Air Force in 1954, Wright returned to Morro Bay and enrolled in California Polytechnic State University at San Luis Obispo (Cal Poly). He was an engineer with the State of California from 1954 to 1958. In 1956, Wright married Virginia Ann Peterson, the daughter of Leonard Vincent Peterson and Helen (Woolums) Peterson. Wright earned a BS in Mechanical Engineering from Cal Poly in June 1958.

After graduation, Wright joined the Advanced Technology Laboratory at RCA in Camden, New Jersey. While working at RCA, he earned an MS in Mechanical Engineering from University of Pennsylvania. Later, while director of ATL, Wright attended the Harvard Business School six-week Advanced Management Program in 1976 and 1977. In 1969, he became a registered professional engineer in the State of New Jersey.

The Wrights raised four children; Neil (b.1958), Sue (Potter, b. 1961), Warren (b. 1962), and Anne (Thrush, b. 1966) while living in Haddonfield, New Jersey.

== Career ==
=== RCA ===
Wright's early work at RCA focused on electrostatic printing, including a five color electrofax machine designed for the U.S. Army to print maps. This work led to three patents (U.S. Pat. 3,133,484 - Electrostatic Printing Apparatus, May 19, 1964; US 3,274,565 - Optical-photoconductive reproducer utilizing insulative liquids; U.S. Pat. 3,343,956 - Electrostatic Printing Process Wherein Development is Achieved by Sequential Application of Carrier Liquid and Developer Particles.)

Wright's later work at RCA focused on the use of III-V elements for energy generation, including the prototype radioisotope thermoelectric generators for deep space probes and Vuilleumier cycle refrigeration for spacecraft sensor cooling, cooling (holding the record for the greatest temperature drop using thermoelectric materials), and for improving night vision glasses. Wright developed a thermoelectric water reclamation system for crewed space vehicles.

Wright was responsible for the development of the first thermoelectric air conditioner with a coefficient of performance of greater than two. He was responsible for the first fossil-fuel, silicon–germanium thermoelectric generator. Under Wright's direction, a magnesium-mercuric oxide battery was developed which exhibited an energy density of watt-hours per pound. During this time, Wright was also instrumental in developing technology for weather and other satellites. Some inventions at ATL were less successful, such as the videodisc and the bulls-eye UPC scanner.

Wright served as director of RCA Advanced Technology Laboratories from 1972 to 1977, now part of Lockheed Martin. In 1978, he was appointed vice president and general manager of the AstroElectronics Division. During his time there, they built the largest thermo-vac chamber for the testing of satellite systems in a space-like environment. Wright also led bidding on two satellite contracts that would become the first communication satellites to use solid-state amplifiers. The bids leveraged the common engineering costs for the two projects, assigning one-half the common costs to each project. Winning only one of the contracts would be been financially disastrous for the Astro division because one-half of the satellite's engineering costs would exceed Astro's profits from the contact. Winning both contracts, however, made meant that engineering costs were covered by the two satellite contracts.

In 1981, Wright was named division vice president and general manager of the RCA Government Systems division. Wright spent 28 years at RCA, rising to the position of Senior Vice President, Corporate Planning and Development in 1985. He was responsible for developing and administrating the strategic plans for RCA.

The General Electric Corporation GE reacquired RCA in a deal that appears to have had little input from the board of directors of RCA or its chief executives. Indeed, the day of a board meeting in which Thorton Bradshaw and then CEO Robert Frederick presented a detailed strategic plan, Bradshaw later met Jack Welch, Chairman of GE met in the apartment of Felix G. Rohatyn of Lazard Freres, the company's investment banker. Wright, who was then serving as Senior Vice President responsible for planning, was likewise caught unawares of the meeting. After the merger of RCA into the GE, Wright served as Senior Vice President of GE, responsible for planning the merger of RCA's assets with those existing at GE.

=== Fairchild Industries ===
In 1986, Wright was named as President and Chief Operating Officer of Fairchild Industries From 1986 to 1988, Wright served as the President and Chief Operating Officer of Fairchild. There he led a reorganization of the company that returned it to profitability. Part of that restructuring required the closing of the Fairchild Republic Company aircraft manufacturing plant on Long Island after the loss of the Air Force contract for the Fairchild T-46A.

=== Chrysler Technologies ===
In 1988, Wright was named Chairman of Chrysler Technologies Corporation (CTC), the aerospace and defense electronics arm of the Chrysler Corporation. Wright guided the company's focus toward spacecraft, defense electronics, and selected industrial products. He served in that capacity until his retirement in 1996.

=== Consulting and boards ===
Wright was president of Wright Associates, Engineering and Business Consultants, a company he formed in 1997. He joined Carlisle Enterprises, LLC, a private equity firm in that year. He served on the boards of two public companies, Odetics and its successor, Iteris.

Wright was a member of the board or advisors for the Colleges of Engineering for Cal Poly and the University of Pennsylvania. He also served as a director of the Iteris Subsidiary from January 1999 to October 2004. Wright was the President of Wright Associates. He also served as a director of the Iteris Subsidiary from January 1999 to October 2004.

== Service and honors ==
Wright was a member of the American Association for the Advancement of Science (AAAS), Institute of Electrical and Electronics Engineers (IEEE), American Society of Mechanical Engineers (ASME), and the National Society of Professional Engineers (NSPE).

Following President Ronald Reagan's 1984 trip to China, Wright participated in two trade missions to China. The first (July 21–26, 1984) focused on the aerospace industry and the second (March 21 – April 4, 1985) dealt with the electronics industry. In 1995, President Bill Clinton named Wright a member of the National Security Telecommunications Advisory Committee (NSTAC). In 1987, he was named the Cal Poly College of Engineering Alumnus of the Year. In 1988, Wright was awarded the D. Robert Yarnall Award for "outstanding contribution in the field of engineering to society, either in public service, private industry, or education, that has enhanced the image of the University of Pennsylvania".
