= Nina & Frederik =

Danish–Dutch popular singing duo

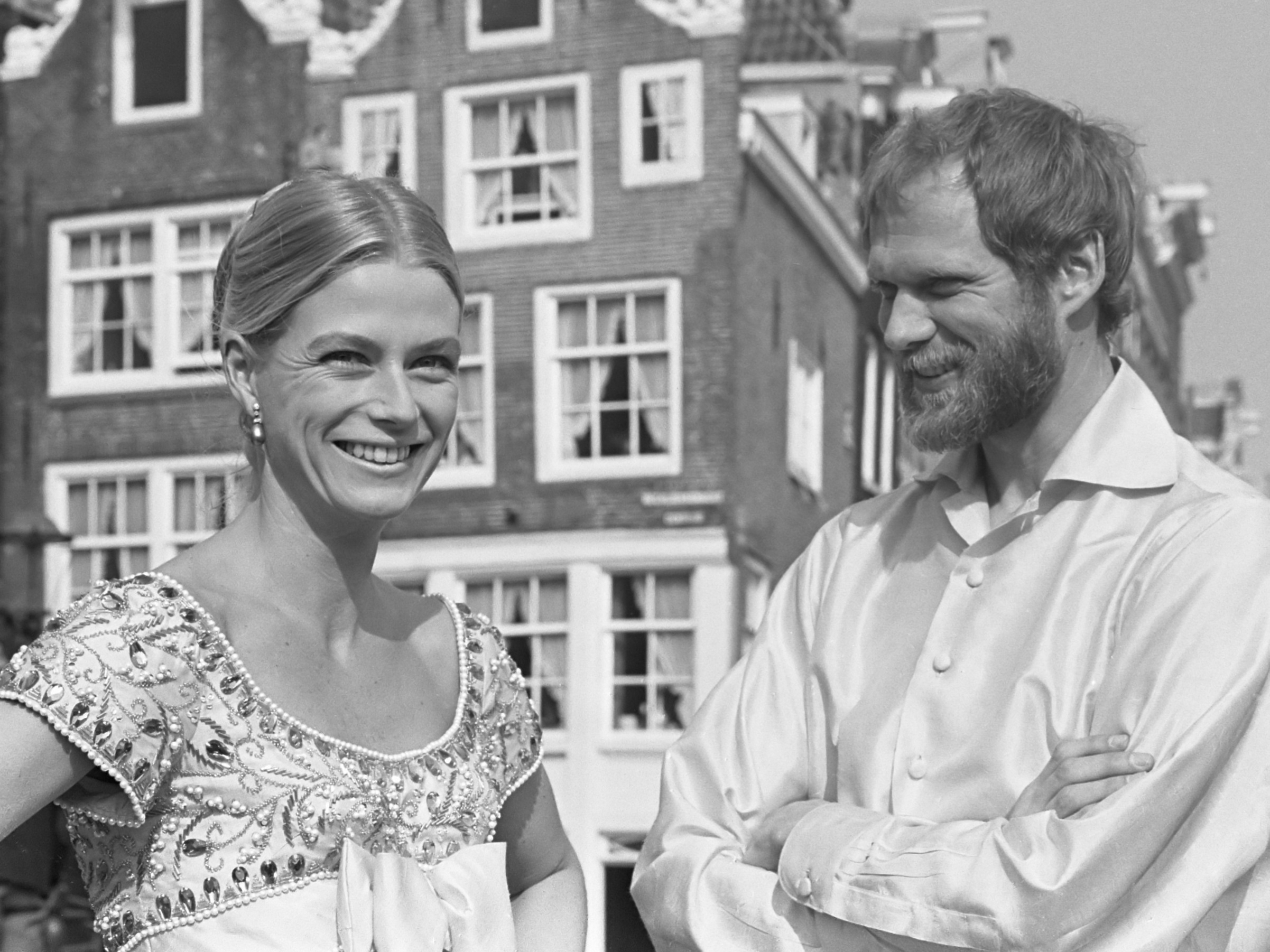
Nina and Frederik in Amsterdam, making a TV show in 1967.

Nina & Frederik were a Danish–Dutch popular singing duo of the late 1950s and early 1960s. Their repertoire consisted of a blend of folk music, calypsos and standards. The duo consisted of Frederik van Pallandt and his then wife, Nina van Pallandt.

== History ==
Nina and Frederik began singing together at the age of four, but since Frederik's father was the Dutch ambassador to Denmark, his family soon moved to Trinidad and Frederik eventually began to study at the university, where he formed a calypso band. During this time he kept writing to Nina, and in 1957 they met again at her parents' home, where one evening he played his guitar for her. To his surprise Nina began singing to it, and it was at that moment that they decided to sing together. Originally they sang only for their friends, and occasionally at house parties. This led to them being asked to perform at charity shows, and soon they were in demand professionally. On 1 July 1957, the duo made their professional show business debut in Copenhagen's top night club, Mon Cœur. Within a matter of months they became favourites throughout Europe, and also starred in the 1958 Danish singing-themed comedy The Richest Girl in the World. The couple married in September 1960. In 1961, they had their own series on British Television, Nina and Frederik at Home.

Their earliest known single was "Jamaica Farewell"/"Come Back Liza", both calypso songs, issued in 1959 on Pye International 7N 25021, but showing a 1957 'recording first published' date.

Their debut album, Nina & Frederik, charted at number 9 on the UK Albums Chart in February 1960. Their second collection, also entitled Nina & Frederik but with a different selection of songs, peaked at number 11 in the UK chart in May 1961.

In 1963, they spent three weeks performing at the Savoy Hotel in London, and in December of the same year they gave a concert at the Royal Festival Hall, and made guest appearances on the panel of Juke Box Jury. In 1966, they recorded a live album An Evening with Nina & Frederik at the Albert Hall. (Columbia SX 6077)

Shunning the limelight, Frederik insisted the duo retire shortly thereafter, and the couple eventually divorced in 1976.

Frederik died in the Philippines from gunshot wounds on 15 May 1994.

== Selected singles ==
Year	Single	Peak position	
Year	Single	UK	DE
1959	"Mary's Boy Child"	26	—
1960	"Listen to the Ocean"	46	—
1960	"Little Donkey"	3	—
1961	"Longtime Boy"	43	—
1961	"Sucu Sucu"	23	—
1961	"Rund ist die Welt"	—	16
1964	"Little Boxes"	—	—
