= Bobby Thompson (comedian) =

British actor, entertainer and comedian

- Born: Robert Michael Thompson; 18 November 1911; Penshaw, Sunderland, England
- Died: 16 April 1988 (aged 76); North Shields, Tyne and Wear, England
- Occupation: Comedian
- Spouse: Eleanor Cicely Palmer

Robert Michael Thompson (18 November 1911 – 16 April 1988) was an English stand-up comedian, actor and entertainer from Penshaw, Sunderland. Although he was raised in Penshaw, he also lived in Great Lumley and Barley Mow, near Chester-le-Street, later moving to Whitley Bay.

== Early years ==
He was the seventh child of John and Mary Thompson, both of whom died by the time Bobby was eight years old. He was then raised by his elder sister in the village of Fatfield.

After leaving school at fifteen, he started work at North Biddick Colliery, earning seven shillings and sixpence a week. He would supplement his income by playing the harmonica around local public houses and competing in Domino tournaments. His first stand-up performance took place at the Gem Cinema in Penshaw as a young boy.

Thompson was married three times. His first wife was Anna Marjoram . His second wife, Phyllis, died on 25 April 1967. He announced his engagement to Mary Douglass, 62, of Annfield Plain a few years later, but the engagement was called off. In 1982, Thompson married his housekeeper, Eleanor Cicely Palmer, more commonly known as Cissy Ward (née Wake). Thompson was her third husband and she was famous for being taller than him.

== Career ==
Famous for his broad Pitmatic accent, self-deprecating humour and mastery of the mother-in-law joke, Thompson was affectionately known as The Little Waster due to his short stature, which he often played on during his act. His most famous outfit was a worn-out striped jumper and a flat cap. An ever-present Woodbine cigarette stub hanging from the corner of his mouth was also an integral part of his on-stage persona.

His attempts to move beyond North East England were limited and hindered by the regional bias of his humour, although he did enjoy some success with the BBC radio variety show Wot Cheor Geordie, and appeared on the Wogan television talk show in 1985.

Bobby made recordings of three comedy songs written for him by local composer Eric Boswell: You Little Waster. The songs incorporated jokes from Bobby's act.

Personal problems and his health affected his career in the 1970s, but he remained a North East favourite, particularly on the club scene, until his death.

== Death ==
Thompson died on 16 April 1988, after suffering from emphysema and cancer.
