= 2025 in Canada =

- Decades: 2000s; 2010s; 2020s
- See also: History of Canada; Timeline of Canadian history; List of years in Canada

Events from the year 2025 in Canada.

== Incumbents ==
=== The Crown ===
- Monarch – Charles III

=== Federal government ===
- Governor General – Mary Simon
- Prime Minister – Justin Trudeau (until March 14); then Mark Carney
- Parliament – 44th (until March 23), then 45th (from May 26)

=== Provincial governments ===
==== Lieutenant Governors ====
- Lieutenant Governor of Alberta – Salma Lakhani
- Lieutenant Governor of British Columbia – Janet Austin (until January 30); then Wendy Lisogar-Cocchia
- Lieutenant Governor of Manitoba – Anita Neville
- Lieutenant Governor of New Brunswick – Brenda Murphy (until January 22); then Louise Imbeault
- Lieutenant Governor of Newfoundland and Labrador – Joan Marie Aylward
- Lieutenant Governor of Nova Scotia – Michael Savage
- Lieutenant Governor of Ontario – Edith Dumont
- Lieutenant Governor of Prince Edward Island – Wassim Salamoun
- Lieutenant Governor of Quebec – Manon Jeannotte
- Lieutenant Governor of Saskatchewan – Russell Mirasty (until January 31); then Bernadette McIntyre

==== Premiers ====
- Premier of Alberta – Danielle Smith
- Premier of British Columbia – David Eby
- Premier of Manitoba – Wab Kinew
- Premier of New Brunswick – Susan Holt
- Premier of Newfoundland and Labrador –
  - Andrew Furey (until May 9)
  - John Hogan (May 9 to October 29)
  - then Tony Wakeham
- Premier of Nova Scotia – Tim Houston
- Premier of Ontario – Doug Ford
- Premier of Prince Edward Island –
  - Dennis King (until February 21)
  - Rob Lantz (February 21 to December 12)
  - then Bloyce Thompson
- Premier of Quebec – François Legault
- Premier of Saskatchewan – Scott Moe

=== Territorial governments ===
==== Commissioners ====
- Commissioner of Northwest Territories – Gerald W. Kisoun
- Commissioner of Nunavut – Eva Aariak
- Commissioner of Yukon – Adeline Webber

==== Premiers ====
- Premier of Northwest Territories – R.J. Simpson
- Premier of Nunavut – P.J. Akeeagok (until November 20); then John Main
- Premier of Yukon –
  - Ranj Pillai (until June 27)
  - Mike Pemberton (June 27 to November 22)
  - then Currie Dixon

== Events ==
=== January ===
- January 6 – Justin Trudeau announces his resignation as leader of the Liberal Party, effective following the selection of his successor.
- January 28
  - The Public Inquiry into Foreign Interference publishes its final report, saying that it had found “no evidence of traitors” in the Parliament of Canada, while warning that foreign actors were generating disinformation in traditional and social media to threaten the democratic system.
  - Tanner Fox is sentenced to life imprisonment of the Supreme Court of British Columbia for the 2022 murder of Sikh businessman Ripudaman Singh Malik, who was acquitted of involvement in the 1985 bombing of Air India Flight 182, in Surrey.
- January 29 – Ontario premier Doug Ford announces that a snap provincial election would be held on 27 February, citing the need for a stronger mandate to respond to threats of tariffs by US president Donald Trump.

=== February ===
- February 1 – US president Donald Trump imposes a 10% tariff on energy imports from Canada and a 25% tariff for other Canadian goods, prompting Prime Minister Trudeau to declare a 25% on American imports in response.
- February 3
  - The provincial government of Ontario imposes a ban on American companies from bidding on government contracts and terminates an agreement with Starlink to provide internet to remote areas of northern Ontario as retaliation for the U.S. imposing tariffs.
  - The US suspends its increased tariffs on Canadian imports for a month following last-minute calls between Prime Minister Trudeau and President Trump.
- February 17 – A Bombardier CRJ900LR (N932XJ) operated by Endeavor Air as Delta Connection Flight 4819 from Minneapolis–Saint Paul International Airport crashes and overturns on landing at Toronto Pearson International Airport, injuring at least 17 people.
- February 19
  - Prime Minister Trudeau officially announces the establishment of Alto, a high-speed rail plan that will connect Quebec City to Toronto.
  - Activist Pat King is sentenced to three months' house arrest on charges related to the Canada convoy protest in 2022.
- February 20
  - Canada wins the 2025 4 Nations Face-Off after defeating the United States 3–2 in Boston.
  - Canada designates the Sinaloa Cartel, the Jalisco New Generation Cartel, the Carteles Unidos, the Cártel del Noreste, the Gulf Cartel, La Nueva Familia Michoacana Organization, Tren de Aragua and MS-13, as terrorist organizations.
- February 24 – Trudeau pledges to send $5 billion in aid to Ukraine, due to the Russian invasion of Ukraine, using funds from seized Russian assets.
- February 25 – Newfoundland and Labrador Premier Andrew Furey announced his intentions to resign as both Premier and Leader of the Liberal Party, kicking off a leadership race.
- February 27 – 2025 Ontario general election: Doug Ford's Progressive Conservatives win a third straight majority, becoming the first party since 1959 to win three straight majorities in Ontario.

=== March ===
- March 3 – Trudeau meets with King Charles III, at his Sandringham estate, to discuss "matters of importance to Canada."
- March 4 – President Trump reimposes expanded tariffs on Canada.
- March 7
  - BC MLA Dallas Brodie is expelled from the Conservative Party of British Columbia caucus.
  - Twelve people are injured in a shooting at a bar in Scarborough, Ontario.
- March 9 – The Liberal Party chooses Mark Carney as their new leader and next prime minister in an election.
- March 11 – 2025 United States trade war with Canada and Mexico: Following Doug Ford's decision to respond to Trump's tariffs with a 25% receptional tariff on electricity exports to the United States, Trump imposes an additional 25% tariff on Canadian steel and aluminum, bringing total tariffs on Canadian steel and aluminum to 50%.
- March 14
  - Liberal leader Carney is sworn in as the 24th prime minister, following Trudeau's resignation.
  - Hudson's Bay Company announced it will be forced to close all stores but six in the Greater Toronto Area and Montreal, in addition to liquidating all inventory. The company later filed for creditor protection.
- March 16 – Carney, in his first international prime ministerial trip, visits Emmanual Macron, the president of France in Paris. Following this, Carney visits Keir Starmer, the prime minister of the United Kingdom, and King Charles III.
- March 17 – The 2025 Terrebonne provincial by-election in Quebec is held.
- March 18 – The 2025 Transcona provincial by-election in Manitoba is held.
- March 20 – Global Affairs Canada announces that four Canadian-Chinese nationals had been executed in China earlier in the year for drug offences.
- March 25 – The Globe and Mail reports that the Canadian Security Intelligence Service believed that agents affiliated with the Indian government assisted Pierre Poilievre's leadership bid in the 2022 Conservative Party of Canada leadership election by fundraising and organizing support for him.

=== April ===
- April 3 – Tamara Lich and Chris Barber are convicted of mischief in their role as organizers of the Canada convoy protest in 2022.
- April 4 – Global Affairs Canada announces that Canada will donate $9.75 million to the Canadian Red Cross, the World Food Programme, the United Nations Office for the Coordination of Humanitarian Affairs, and the Humanitarian Coalition for humanitarian assistance in respond to the 2025 Myanmar Earthquake.
- April 5 – A man is arrested for entering Parliament Hill in Ottawa and locking himself for hours inside the East Block.
- April 24 – A man is shot dead by police following a security incident at Toronto Pearson International Airport.
- April 26 – A car rams into pedestrians at a street festival in Vancouver, killing 11 people.
- April 28 – 2025 Canadian federal election: The Liberals win a plurality of seats in the House of Commons, to form a minority government.

=== May ===
- May 1 – Andrew Parsons announces that he would resign his seat of Burgeo-LaPoile and his portfolio of Industry, Energy and Technology. He had implied earlier in the year that he would stay on until the next election, and then not run again.
- May 2 – Conservative MP Damien Kurek announces his intention to resign his seat of Battle River-Crowfoot to allow Pierre Poilievre to run in a by-election so he could return to Parliament after losing his seat.
- May 3 – John Hogan wins the 2025 Liberal Party of Newfoundland and Labrador leadership election, becoming Premier of Newfoundland and Labrador on May 9.
- May 5 – Alberta Premier Danielle Smith announces that her government would hold a referendum on Alberta's separation from Canada if citizens gathered enough signatures to prompt a referendum.
- May 9 – John Hogan forms a new government and the Hogan ministry is sworn in.
- May 13 – Carney announces a cabinet reshuffle for the 30th Canadian Ministry. The cabinet consists of 38 members, including 24 new members.
- May 16 – Carney and 13 other MPs travel to Vatican City to attend Pope Leo XIV's inaugural mass. Along the way, Carney holds bilateral meetings with German chancellor Friedrich Merz, Italian prime minister Giorgia Meloni, and Ukrainian president Volodymyr Zelenskyy. He later has a brief audience with the pope, concluding his visit on May 18.
- May 23
  - Conservative candidate Jonathan Rowe wins the riding of Terra Nova—The Peninsulas in a judicial recount. Originally, it was believed he had lost to Liberal Anthony Germain by 12 votes. However, Rowe ended up winning by 12 votes after the recount.
  - A group of U.S. Senators visit Ottawa to meet with Prime Minister Mark Carney in an effort to maintain the relationship between the two countries amidst Trump's tariffs on the country and calls to make it the 51st state.
- May 26 – Jeffrey Wood is sentenced to two years' imprisonment by a court in Ottawa for stealing Yousuf Karsh's photograph of Winston Churchill, The Roaring Lion, from the Château Laurier in Ottawa in 2022.
- May 27 – 2025 royal tour of Canada:
  - King Charles III visits Canada along with Queen Camilla on Prime Minister Mark Carney's advice. He also read the Speech from the Throne, the first reigning monarch to do so since 1977. The visit is seen as a reinforcement of Canadian sovereignty in light of US president Donald Trump's rhetoric on threatening to annex Canada.
  - The National Assembly of Quebec votes for a motion calling on Quebec to abolish all ties with the monarchy.
- May 28 – 2025 Canadian wildfires:
  - Wildfires near Flin Flon cause a declaration of a state of emergency in Manitoba and the evacuation of over 17,000 people.
  - A state of emergency is declared in Saskatchewan due to wildfires.

=== June ===
- June 1 – All remaining Hudson's Bay department stores close.
- June 3 – Senator David Richards joins the Conservative caucus in the Senate.
- June 10 – Senator Mary Jane McCallum joins the Conservative caucus in the Senate.
- June 11 – Canada joins New Zealand, Australia, the United Kingdom and Norway in banning and freezing the assets of two far-right Israeli government ministers Itamar Ben-Gvir and Bezalel Smotrich for advocating violence and the displacement of Palestinians.
- June 12
  - Montreal Police arrest Leonardo Rizzuto, the alleged head of the Montreal Mafia.
  - Senator Larry Smith re-joins the Conservative caucus in the Senate.
- June 16–17 – 51st G7 summit in Kananaskis, Alberta.
- June 17
  - India and Canada announce an agreement to restore normal diplomatic relations following a dispute that began in 2023 over the killing of Sikh separatist Hardeep Singh Nijjar in Vancouver.
  - Damien Kurek officially resigns his seat of Battle River-Crowfoot, triggering a by-election.
- June 19 – A rockslide at Banff National Park, Alberta, kills two people and injures three others.
- June 23 – Provincial by-elections are held in Olds-Didsbury-Three Hills, Edmonton-Ellerslie, and Edmonton-Strathcona, Alberta.
- June 29 – The federal government rescinds its digital services tax in response to President Trump suspending trade negotiations between Canada and the United States.

=== July ===
- July 3 – MHA and former MP, Siobhan Coady, announced that she will not seek re-election in the 2025 Newfoundland and Labrador general election.
- July 8
  - Four people are arrested on suspicion of plotting to create an anti-government militia and "community" in the Quebec City area.
  - Two Cessna aircraft collide mid-air near Steinbach, Manitoba during a training flight, killing both pilots.
- July 24
  - Five former members of Canada men's national junior ice hockey team are acquitted of sexual assault in a 2018 case involving a woman in London, Ontario.
  - Three miners are rescued from the collapse of the Red Chris mine in the Tahltan Nation of British Columbia.
- July 30 – Canada announces that it would recognize the State of Palestine effective September.

=== August ===
- August 3 – Wildfires break out on the Avalon Peninsula in Newfoundland and Labrador. Evacuation orders are put in place for the towns of Holyrood, Conception Bay South, and many smaller communities in Northern Conception Bay.
- August 6 – A legionnaires' disease outbreak that started in London, Ontario, on July 8 ends after 70 cases and 3 deaths.
- August 16 – A strike is held by more than 10,000 flight attendants of Air Canada over pay, triggering a suspension of operations by the airline. The strike is declared illegal by the Canada Industrial Relations Board on August 18 and ends following an agreement between the strikers and management on August 19.
- August 18 – Pierre Poilievre wins the 2025 Battle River—Crowfoot federal by-election.
- August 28 – The Coalition Avenir Québec government of Quebec announces it will ban public prayer in public places.

=== September ===
- September 3 – Cult leader and self-proclaimed Queen of Canada Romana Didulo is arrested during an RCMP raid on her compound in Richmound, Saskatchewan.
- September 4 – 2025 Hollow Water First Nation stabbings: One person is killed while eight others are injured in a knife attack at the Hollow Water First Nation in Manitoba. The attacker, identified as the fatality's brother, dies in a collision with a police vehicle.
- September 4–14 – 2025 Toronto International Film Festival.
- September 6 – George Hohl, a 20-year veteran of the Canadian Armed Forces serving on NATO's Operation Reassurance in Latvia, is found dead near the Ādaži military base after going missing three days earlier.
- September 10 – A car crashes into a daycare center in Richmond Hill, Ontario, killing a child and injuring nine people, including six children.
- September 16 – Chrystia Freeland resigns as federal minister of transport and internal trade to become a special envoy to Ukraine.
- September 19 – The federal government bans the Irish rap group Kneecap from entering Canada, accusing it of supporting political violence and terrorism over its alleged support for Hamas and Hezbollah.
- September 21 – Canada formally recognizes the State of Palestine.
- September 23 – The Supreme Court of Canada orders a reprieve in the culling of culling over 400 ostriches in the 2025 Canadian ostrich culling controversy.
- September 24 – Canada signs a free trade agreement with Indonesia.
- September 25 – A strike is held at Canada Post by 55,000 workers belonging to the Canadian Union of Postal Workers in protest against the federal government's plan to phase out door-to-door mail delivery.
- September 29 – The federal government designates the Bishnoi Gang as a terrorist organisation on charges of waging terrorism and violence against Indian Canadians.

=== October ===
- October 1 – The federal government rejects a request by Marineland of Canada to send its 20 live whales to an aquarium in China, citing animal welfare laws.
- October 6 – The 2025 Alberta teachers' strike begins, with 51,000 teachers off work and classes cancelled for 23 days. It was organized by the Alberta Teachers' Association.
- October 9 – The Coalition Avenir Québec government tabled a draft first Constitution of Quebec to the National Assembly of Quebec.
- October 14 – The 2025 Newfoundland and Labrador general election is held. The Progressive Conservatives win a majority government.
- October 20
  - The Toronto Blue Jays win the American League Championship Series and advance to the World Series for the first time since 1993.
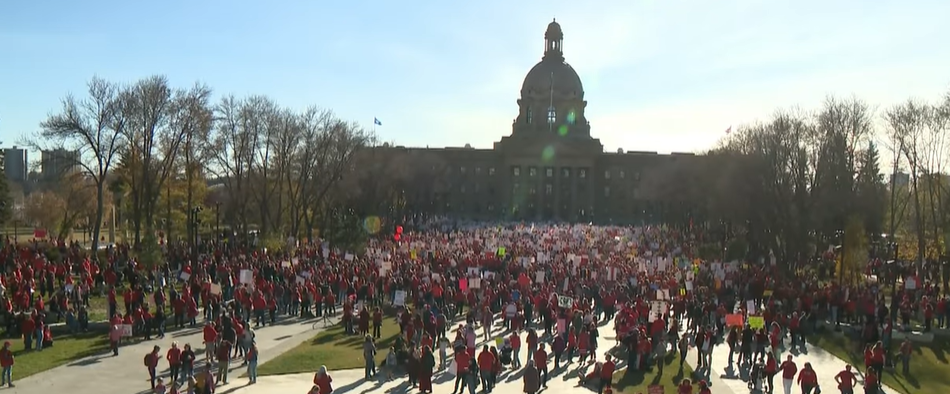
    Rallying at the 2025 Alberta teachers' strike
  - The 2025 Alberta municipal elections are held. Jeromy Farkas and Andrew Knack become the mayors of Calgary and Edmonton, succeeding Jyoti Gondek and Amarjeet Sohi.
- October 27 – The 2025 Nunavut general election is held. John Main becomes premier.
- October 29 – The 2025 Alberta teachers' strike ends. Teachers go back to work and classes resume.
- October 31 – APEC South Korea 2025: Carney meets with Chinese general-secretary Xi Jinping to discuss Canada-China Relations, focusing on bilateral trade barriers on agriculture, canola, seafood, and electric vesicles.

=== November ===
- November 1 – The Los Angeles Dodgers defeat the Toronto Blue Jays to win the 2025 World Series, their ninth overall World Series title and the first consecutive World Series title since the 2000 New York Yankees.
- November 2 – Canada and the Philippines sign a visiting forces agreement.
- November 3 – 2025 Yukon general election is held. The Yukon Party wins a majority government.
- November 4 – Conservative Nova Scotia federal MP Chris d'Entremont defects to the Liberals.
- November 10 – The Pan American Health Organization revokes Canada's measles-free status over its failure to curb outbreaks of the disease over the past year.
- November 15 – The Canadian Conference of Catholic Bishops receives 62 indigenous artefacts from the Holy See for repatriation after they were taken for a 1925 missionary exhibition in Rome, Italy.
- November 16 – The Saskatchewan Roughriders defeat the Montreal Alouettes to win the 112th Grey Cup in Winnipeg.
- November 17 – The Carney government's budget passes 170-168 with the support of one member of the Green Party.
- November 20 – Eleven people are injured in a grizzly bear attack on a school group along a walking trail in Bella Coola, British Columbia.
- November 25 – Canada lifts visa requirements for Qatari citizens.
- November 27
  - The Coalition Avenir Québec government of Quebec tables bill 9 that would strengthen the 2019 secularism bill 21.
  - A memorandum of understanding is signed between the federal government and the provincial government of Alberta for the construction of an oil pipeline running from the province to the Pacific coast; culture minister and former environment minister Steven Guilbeault resigns from Carney's cabinet later in the day in protest against the agreement.

=== December ===
- December 1 – Canada becomes the first non-European Union member state to join the Security Action for Europe fund.
- December 3–4 – The Conservative Party of British Columbia attempts to remove John Rustad as their leader. He resigns on December 4.
- December 5 – The federal government removes Syria from its list of countries that support "terrorism" and revokes its designation of Hayat Tahrir al-Sham as a "terrorist" organization, citing similar decisions by western governments and efforts by the transitional government in Damascus to restore stability.
- December 6 – A magnitude 7.0 earthquake hits Kluane National Park along the Yukon Territory-Alaska border.
- December 8 – The 2025 Georgetown-Pownal provincial by-election is held.
- December 11 – Conservative Ontario federal MP Michael Ma defects to the Liberals.
- December 18 – Christian Dubé resigns as Quebec Minister of Health.
- December 22 – Carney names Mark Wiseman to be Canada's new ambassador to the US, starting in 2026.
- December 31 — Calgary experiences the second 'catastrophic' rupture of its Bearspaw South feeder main since June 2024. A state of emergency is declared and voluntary indoor water restrictions alongside mandatory outdoor water restrictions are enacted.
- December 26–January 5 – 2026 World Junior Ice Hockey Championships.

== Art and entertainment ==
- List of Canadian films of 2025
- 2025 in Canadian soccer
- 2025 in Canadian music
- 2025 in Canadian television
- List of Canadian submissions for the Academy Award for Best International Feature Film
- 2025–26 NHL season

== Holidays ==
- January 1 – New Year's Day
- February 17 – Family Day
- April 18 – Good Friday
- May 19 – Victoria Day
- July 1 – Canada Day
- September 1 – Labour Day
- September 30 – National Day for Truth and Reconciliation
- October 13 – Thanksgiving Day
- November 11 – Remembrance Day
- December 25 – Christmas Day

== Deaths ==
=== January ===
- January 1 – Gilbert Normand, physician and politician (b. 1943)
- January 3
  - Andrew Pyper, author (b. 1968)
  - Rod Sykes, politician and Mayor of Calgary (b. 1929)
  - Thomas R. Williams, university professor and academic administrator (b. 1939)
- January 4 – Julien Poulin, actor, film director, screenwriter, and film producer (b. 1946)
- January 5 – Al MacNeil, ice hockey player and coach (b. 1935)
- January 6
  - Dwight Foster, ice hockey player (b. 1957)
  - John S. Hunkin, banker, chairman, and president of the CIBC (b. 1945)
  - Dale Wilson, actor (b. 1950)
- January 8 – Jim Lawrence, baseball player (b. 1939)
- January 9
  - Henry Beissel, German-born writer and editor (b. 1929)
  - Mickey Roth, ice hockey player (b. 1927)
  - John William Thomson, politician (b. 1928)
- January 12 – Kim Yaroshevskaya, Russian-born actress (b. 1923)
- January 14 – Nello Altomare, politician (b. 1963)
- January 16 – Dave Lucas, ice hockey player (b. 1932)
- January 17
  - Stéphane Venne, musician, composer and record label executive (b. 1941)
  - Robert Verrall, animator, director, and film producer (b. 1928)
- January 19
  - Marcel Bonin, ice hockey player (b. 1931)
  - Doreen Hall, violinist (b. 1931)
  - George Faulkner, ice hockey player (b. 1933)
  - Tom McVie, ice hockey coach (b. 1935)
- January 21
  - Garth Hudson, musician (b. 1937)
  - Doug Sneyd, cartoonist (b. 1931)
- January 23
  - David G. A. McLean, lawyer and businessman (b. 1938)
  - Diane Oxner, soprano and voice teacher (b. 1928)
- January 24
  - Toby McDonald, curler, curling coach, and lawyer (b. 1951)
  - Jane McGarrigle, musician and music publisher (b. 1941)
- January 25 – Bill Wilson, hereditary chief, politician, and lawyer (b. 1944)
- January 26 – Mary Hodder, politician (b. 1945)
- January 27 – Michel Cogger, lawyer, businessman, and politician (b. 1939)
- January 29 – Shawn Simpson, ice hockey player and radio personality (b. 1968)

=== February ===
- February 2 – Claude Boileau, ice hockey player (b. 1933)
- February 3 – John Jonas, engineer (b. 1932)
- February 6 – Paul Morris, public address announcer for the Toronto Maple Leafs and sound engineer at Maple Leaf Gardens (b. 1938)
- February 8 – Corey Crewe, musician and comedian (b. 1944)
- February 10
  - Jerome Drayton, German-born Olympic long-distance runner (b. 1945)
  - Grégoire Girard, surveyor and politician (b. 1925)
- February 11 – Bernard Lagacé, organist and musicologist (b. 1930)
- February 12 – Al Valdes, football player (b. 1935)
- February 13 – Bernard Saladin d'Anglure, French-born anthropologist and ethnographer (b. 1936)
- February 14 – Kevyn Major Howard, actor and photographer (b. 1956)
- February 16 – Jean-Denis Gendron, linguist and academic (b. 1925)
- February 17 – Antonine Maillet, novelist, playwright, and scholar (b. 1929)
- February 19 – Olive Sturgess, actress (b. 1933)
- February 22 – Martin O'Malley, journalist and writer (b. 1939)
- February 26 – Jean Campeau, politician, economist, and business executive (b. 1931)
- February 27 – Allan Furlong, politician (b. 1942)

=== March ===
- March 2
  - John Cummins, politician and leader of the Conservative Party of British Columbia (b. 1942)
  - Frank Maher, musician (b. 1934)
- March 3 – Victor Cicansky, sculptor (b. 1935)
- March 5 – Terry Wilson, football player (b. 1942)
- March 6 – Dick Cherry, ice hockey player (b. 1937)
- March 7 – Wally Ursuliak, curler (b. 1929)
- March 11 – Judy Bethel, politician (b. 1943)
- March 13 – Claude Verret, ice hockey player (b. 1963)
- March 14 – Broyce Jacobs, politician (b. 1940)
- March 18 – Denise Boucher, writer (b. 1935)
- March 20 – Pat Murphy, politician and Mayor of Alberton (b. 1962)
- March 25 – Edith Ballantyne, Czech-born activist (b. 1922)
- March 26 – Howie Hughes, ice hockey player (b. 1939)
- March 29 – Dick Damron, musician (b. 1934)
- March 30 – John Meisel, Austrian-born political scientist, professor, scholar, and chairman of the CRTC (b. 1923)
- March 31 – Mark Laforest, ice hockey player (b. 1962)

=== April ===
- April 2 – Peter Pearson, film director and screenwriter (b. 1938)
- April 5 – Colin Fox, actor (b. 1938)
- April 6 – Robert Corbett, politician (b. 1938)
- April 7 – Greg Millen, ice hockey player and sportscaster (b. 1957)
- April 9
  - Philippe de Gaspé Beaubien, chairman and CEO of Telemedia (b. 1928)
  - John Van Seters, Biblist and religious studies scholar (b. 1935)
- April 10
  - Douglas John Hall, professor at McGill University and minister of the United Church of Canada (b. 1928)
  - Ted Kotcheff, Canadian-Bulgarian film and television director and producer (b. 1931)
- April 11 – Gerry McNamara, scout and general manager with the Toronto Maple Leafs (b. 1934)
- April 12 – Bob Wood, politician (b. 1940)
- April 15 – Wayne Clifford, poet, editor, and educator (b. 1944)
- April 16
  - Ed Lumley, corporate executive and politician (b. 1939)
  - Steve Mapsalak, politician (b. 1957)
- April 19 – Bev Beaver, athlete (b. 1947)
- April 23 – Billy Joe MacLean, politician (b. 1936)
- April 24
  - Rita Briansky, Polish-born painter and printmaker (b. 1925)
  - Jean-Claude Germain, playwright, author, journalist, and historian (b. 1939)
- April 25 – Bob Cleroux, boxer (b. 1938)
- April 29 – Ed Van Impe, ice hockey player (b. 1940)
- April 30
  - Henry Friesen, endocrinologist (b. 1934)
  - D. Gregory Powell, emergency medicine physician (b. 1947)
  - Phil Roberto, ice hockey player (b. 1949)

=== May ===
- May 2 – Dave Gorman, ice hockey player (b. 1955)
- May 3 – Peter Coade, meteorologist and television and radio weather presenter (b. 1942)
- May 4 – Guylaine Lanctôt, phlebologist and anti-vaccine activist (b. 1941)
- May 6 – Ovide Doiron, racing driver and engine builder (b. 1940)
- May 7
  - Frank Caprice, ice hockey player (b. 1962)
  - Jim Spenst, World War II veteran (b. 1926)
- May 9
  - Wade Blanchard, curler (b. 1959)
  - Régent Lacoursière, swimmer (b. 1935)
  - Bob Lemieux, ice hockey player and coach (b. 1944)
  - Serge Mongeau, physician, writer, publisher, and politician (b. 1937)
- May 13 – Murray Anderson, ice hockey player (b. 1949)
- May 15 – Judith Copithorne, poet (b. 1939)
- May 18
  - Charles Thiffault, assistant coach for the NHL (b. 1938)
  - James Till, University of Toronto biophysicist (b. 1931)
- May 24
  - Tom Dunphy, politician, teacher, and realtor (b. 1937)
  - Kenny Marco, guitarist (b. 1947)
- May 26 – Co Hoedeman, Dutch-Canadian filmmaker (b. 1940)
- May 27 – Janet Ajzenstat, professor at McMaster University (b. 1936)
- May 28 – Claude Roussel, sculptor, painter, and educator (b. 1930)

=== June ===
- June 3 – Juliette Powell, American-Canadian media expert, tech ethicist, business advisor, author, and beauty pageant titleholder (b. 1970)
- June 4 – Marc Garneau, astronaut, MP, minister of transport and foreign affairs (b. 1949)
- June 5 – Scott Metcalfe, ice hockey player (b. 1967)
- June 6 – Claude Poissant, actor, screenwriter, and theatre director (b. 1955)
- June 9 – Victor-Lévy Beaulieu, writer (b. 1945)
- June 11 – Paul Shooner, politician (b. 1923)
- June 13 – Ralph Katzman, farmer and politician (b. 1940)
- June 15 – Buzz Hargrove, labour leader and president of the Canadian Auto Workers (b. 1944)
- June 16
  - Alia Hogben, Burmese-born social worker and activist (b. 1937)
  - Ron Taylor, baseball player and physician (b. 1937)
- June 19 – Raymond Laflamme, theoretical physicist and the founder and director of the Institute for Quantum Computing at the University of Waterloo (b. 1960)
- June 21 – John McCallum, politician, economist, diplomat, and university professor (b. 1950)
- June 22
  - Pierre Jean Jeanniot, French-born president and CEO of Air Canada (b. 1933)
  - Guy Lauzon, politician (b. 1944)
- June 24
  - Denys Chabot, writer and journalist (b. 1945)
  - Serge Fiori, musician (b. 1952)
- June 30 – Robert C. Dynes, Canadian-American physicist, researcher, and academic administrator (b. 1942)

=== July ===
- July 1
  - Alex Delvecchio, ice hockey player, coach, and general manager (b. 1931)
  - Ken Walker, British-born medical writer, celebrity doctor, obstetrician, gynecologist, and abortion practitioner (b. 1924)
- July 4 – Lyndon Byers, ice hockey player and radio host (b. 1964)
- July 5 – Jake Epp, politician, cabinet minister, and corporate executive (b. 1939)
- July 9 – Gérard Lécuyer, politician and cabinet minister (b. 1936)
- July 10 – Debbie Nightingale, film and television producer (b. 1953)
- July 16 – Wayne Thomas, ice hockey player and executive (b. 1947)
- July 17
  - Mark Bonokoski, newspaper columnist and commentator (b. 1947)
  - Gary Chown, football player (b. 1951)
  - Laura Vinson, musician (b. 1947)
- July 18
  - Aganetha Dyck, sculptor (b. 1937)
  - Michael Melski, playwright and filmmaker (b. 1969)
  - Harry Standjofski, actor, theatre director, and playwright (b. 1959)
  - Mary Vingoe, playwright, actress, and theatre director (b. 1955)
- July 19 – Raymond Damblant, French-born judoka (b. 1931)
- July 23 – Michelle Duff, motorcycle racer (b. 1939)
- July 26 – Rosemary Kilbourn, printmaker (b. 1931)
- July 28
  - Cécile Dionne, member of the Dionne quintuplets (b. 1934)
  - Joseph Ziegler, American-born actor and theatre director (b. 1953)
- July 31
  - Léandre Bergeron, writer, historian, linguist, and cartoonist (b. 1933)
  - Jan Dukszta, Polish-born politician (b. 1932)

=== August ===
- August 1 – Fleg, editorial cartoonist (b. 1963)
- August 2 – Hilary Weston, Irish-born business mogul, writer, and lieutenant governor of Ontario (b. 1942)
- August 3 – Michel Gratton, politician, civil engineer, and member of the National Assembly of Quebec (b. 1939)
- August 4 – Maurice McGregor, South African-born cardiologist and academic leader (b. 1920)
- August 6 – Phil Latreille, ice hockey player (b. 1938)
- August 10 – Lillie Johnson, Jamaican-born nurse and public health advocate (b. 1922)
- August 12 – Rodrigue Biron, politician (b. 1934)
- August 14 – Elie Martel, politician (b. 1934)
- August 17
  - John Bartley, New Zealand-born cinematographer (b. 1947)
  - David Crawley, bishop (b. 1937)
  - Mark Kirton, ice hockey player (b. 1958)
- August 18 – Marvin Tile, professor at the University of Toronto and orthopedic surgeon (b. 1933)
- August 21
  - Jacques Poulin, novelist (b. 1937)
  - Gail Shea, politician (b. 1959)
- August 22 – Ron Turcotte, Hall of Fame jockey (b. 1941)
- August 26 – Yvan Lamonde, academic and historian (b. 1944)

=== September ===
- September 1
  - Graham Greene, actor and recording artist (b. 1952)
  - Lonnie Loach, ice hockey player (b. 1968)
- September 2 – Robert Franz, conductor (b. 1968)
- September 3
  - Andre Champagne, ice hockey player (b. 1943)
  - Guy Rocher, academic and sociologist (b. 1924)
- September 5 – Ken Dryden, ice hockey goaltender, politician, lawyer, businessman, and author (b. 1947)
- September 10 – Norbert Lemire, painter (b. 1949)
- September 11 – Sam Gargan, politician (b. 1948)
- September 14
  - Eddie Giacomin, ice hockey goaltender (b. 1939)
  - René Homier-Roy, journalist and television presenter (b. 1940)
  - Beverly Thomson, journalist and news anchor (b. 1964)
- September 15 – Ione Christensen, politician (b. 1933)
- September 17 – Donald Oliver, lawyer, developer, and politician (b. 1938)
- September 21 – Bernie Parent, ice hockey player (b. 1945)
- September 25 – Balfour Mount, physician, surgeon, and academic (b. 1939)
- September 26 – Jim Bradley, politician (b. 1945)
- September 28 – Alfie MacLeod, politician (b. 1956)

=== October ===
- October 1 – Gabriel Loubier, politician (b. 1932)
- October 6
  - Gisèle Gallichan, journalist (b. 1946)
  - Gerry Ouellette, ice hockey player (b. 1938)
  - Dennis Trudeau, journalist (b. 1948)
- October 8 – Eve Zaremba, writer (b. 1930)
- October 11 – Jack Kane, ice hockey player (b. 1936)
- October 13
  - Bruce Saville, businessman and philanthropist (b. 1944)
  - Anthony Merchant, lawyer, businessman and politician (b. 1944)
- October 14 – Élie Fallu, politician and Mayor of Sainte-Thérèse, Quebec (b. 1932)
- October 15 – Steve Butland, politician and Mayor of Sault Ste. Marie, Ontario (b. 1941)
- October 17
  - Gilles Blais, documentary filmmaker (b. 1941)
  - Guy Hardy, politician (b. 1950)
- October 19
  - Buckley Petawabano, cinematographer and actor (b. 1947 or 1948)
  - Jagannath Prasad Das, Indian-Canadian educational psychologist (b. 1931)
- October 21
  - Jack Heinrich, lawyer and politician (b. 1936)
  - Sheldon Lee, politician (b. 1933)
  - Gregory B. Newby, information scientist (b. 1965)
- October 22 – Normand Lapointe, businessman and politician (b. 1939)
- October 25
  - Cam Brown, ice hockey player (b. 1969)
  - Jeremy Searle, English-born politician (b. 1953)
- October 26 – Tim Cook, military historian and author (b. 1971)
- October 28 – Bernard Grandmaître, politician (b. 1933)
- October 29 – Lise Bacon, politician (b. 1934)

=== November ===
- November 2 – Ronald Ian Cheffins, lawyer and political scientist (b. 1930)
- November 4 – Gerald Maier, engineer and oilman (b. 1928)
- November 5 – Leon Stickle, NHL linesman (b. 1948)
- November 6 – Mel Bridgman, ice hockey player (b. 1955)
- November 7
  - Jean-Paul Diamond, politician (b. 1940)
  - Roger Picard, ice hockey player (b. 1933)
- November 8
  - Alban D'Amours, businessman (b. 1940)
  - Bill Slack, baseball player, manager, and coach (b. 1933)
- November 11 – Jack B. Newton, astronomer (b. 1942)
- November 12 – Kenneth G. Davey, biologist (b. 1932)
- November 15 – Rolande Faucher, author and francophone activist (b. 1941)
- November 16
  - Bill Brady, journalist (b. 1932)
  - Herb Cox, politician (b. 1950)
- November 18
  - Maureen U. Beecher, historian and editor (b. 1935)
  - Spencer Lofranco, actor (b. 1992)
  - Ian Ross, playwright (b. 1968)
- November 24 – Derek Holmes, ice hockey player, coach, administrator, and agent (b. 1939)
- November 25 – Colleen Jones, curler and television personality (b. 1959)
- November 27 – Barry Dempster, poet, novelist, and editor (b. 1952)
- November 30 – Tim Harkness, baseball player (b. 1937)

=== December ===
- December 2 – Moustafa Ali, Egyptian-Canadian football player (b. 1965)
- December 3 – Jean-Jacques Croteau, politician (b. 1930)
- December 5
  - Claude Boucher, politician (b. 1942)
  - Frank Gehry, Canadian-American architect and designer (b. 1929)
- December 9 – Béatrice Picard, actress (b. 1929)
- December 10 – Jacques Nadeau, photojournalist and teacher (b. 1953)
- December 13 – Bobby Rousseau, ice hockey player (b. 1940)
- December 14 – Paul Gagné, ice hockey player and coach (b. 1962)
- December 16 – Bob Wong, politician (b. 1941)
- December 19
  - Cosimo Filane, musician and businessperson (b. 1939)
  - Janine O'Leary Cobb, women's health activist and educator (b. 1933)
- December 22 – Gathie Falk, painter, sculptor, and installation and performance artist (b. 1928)
- December 24 – Annette Dionne, member of the Dionne quintuplets (b. 1934)
- December 28
  - Guy Chouinard, ice hockey player and coach (b. 1956)
  - Lowell MacDonald, ice hockey player (b. 1941)
