= Boileau =

Boileau can refer to:

Persons

- Alexander Boileau, an early surveyor, census administrator and agent of the East India Company
- Arthur Boileau (born 1957), Canadian Olympic distance runner
- Boileau baronets, a title in the Baronetage of Tacolneston Hall in the County of Norfolk, United Kingdom
- Boileau-Narcejac, pen name of Pierre Boileau and Pierre Ayraud, also known as Thomas Narcejac, French writers of police stories
- Charles Boileau, 17th century French ecclesiastic and preacher, member of the Académie française
- Claude Boileau (1933–2025), Canadian ice hockey player
- Emmanuel Boileau de Castelnau (1857–1923), French mountain climber
- George Theodore Boileau (1912–1965), American Roman Catholic bishop
- Gilles Boileau, 17th century member of the Académie française
- Jacques Boileau, 17th century French clergyman
- John Theophilus Boileau (1805–1886), British army engineer
- Nicolas Boileau-Despréaux (1636–1711), 17th century French writer

Places

- Boileau, Quebec, Canada

Other

- Boileau premetro station, a premetro station in the Etterbeek municipality of Brussels
