= BAPE =

BAPE (or A Bathing Ape) is a Japanese clothing company.

BAPE may also refer to:

- Basic Alpha PinPad Encryptor, used on ATM machines to encrypt the cardholder's personal identification number (PIN)
- Office of Public Hearings on the Environment (French: Bureau d'audiences publiques sur l'environnement), an agency of the Government of Quebec
