= Lacoursière =

Lacoursière is a surname of French origin, found mainly in Quebec. Notable people with the surname include:

- Jacques Lacoursière (1932–2021), Canadian TV host, author and historian
- Régent Lacoursière (1935–2025), Canadian swimmer

== See also ==
- Luc Lacourcière (1910–1989), Québécois writer and ethnographer
