= 2015 Parapan American Games torch relay =

- Host city: Toronto, Canada
- Countries visited: Canada
- Distance: 700 km
- Torch bearers: 250
- Start date: August 3, 2015
- End date: August 7, 2015
- No. of torches: 2

The 2015 Parapan American Games torch relay was a 5-day torch relay, from August 3 to 7, 2015, being held prior to the start of the Games. Two torches were lit, one in the west at Niagara Falls and one in the east at Ottawa. Covering over 700 kilometres (430 mi), the two torches made their way towards and reunited in Toronto.

An application period for Canadians to carry the torch opened from April 7 to 19, 2015. Anyone aged 13 or older as of August 3, 2015 was eligible to become a torchbearer. Most of the torchbearers were selected by a random selection, while the others were selected by torch relay communities and games partners. The torch was carried by 250 torchbearers.

== Route ==
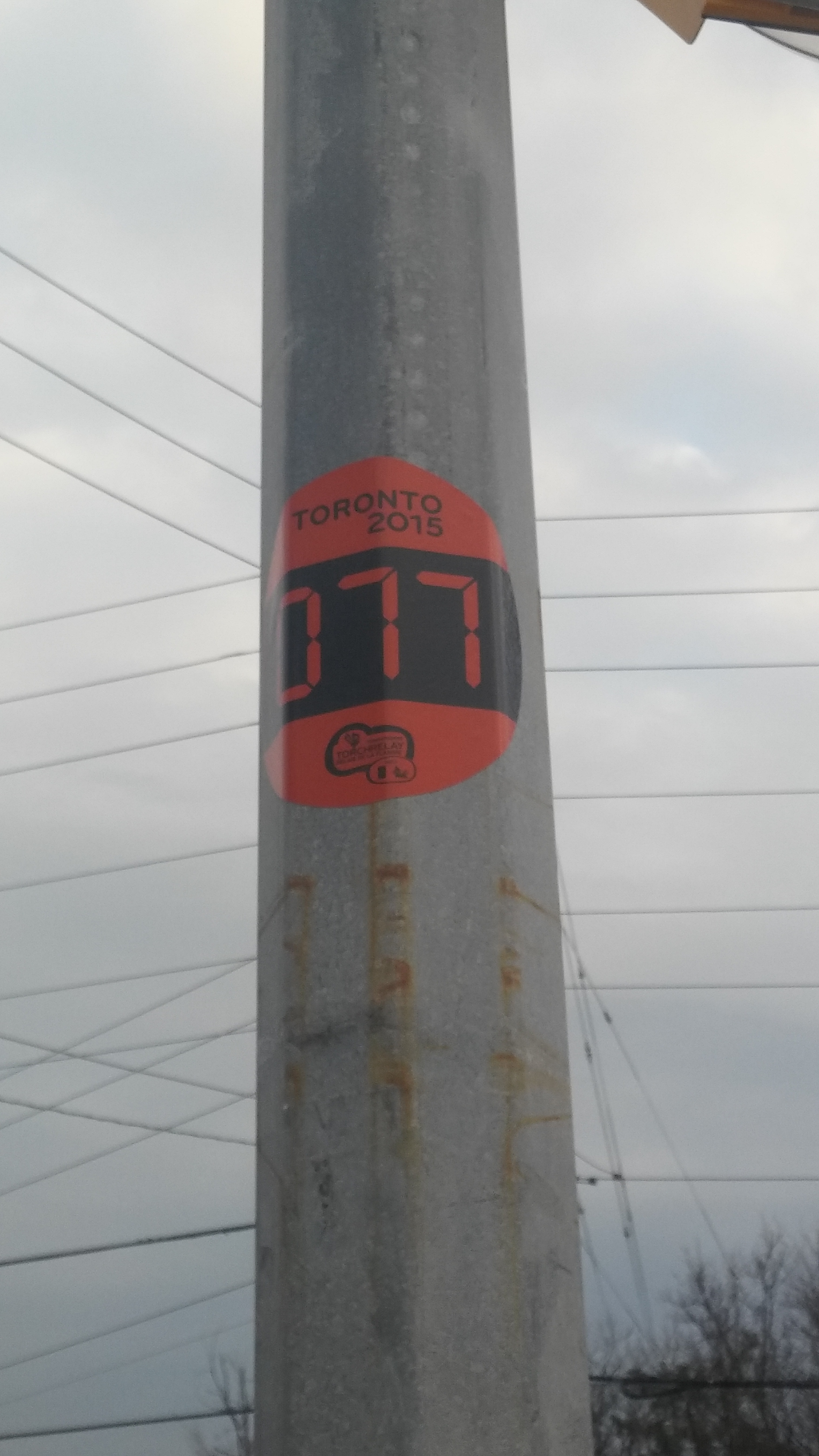
One of the many torch relay route markers

All cities are in the province of Ontario.

Day	Date	East torch cities	West torch cities
1	August 3	Flame lighting ceremony in Ottawa, then travel to Kingston	Flame lighting ceremony in Niagara Falls, then travel to St. Catharines and Port Dalhousie
2	August 4	Belleville, Oshawa	Hamilton
3	August 5	Whitby	Burlington, Mississauga
4	August 6	Ajax	Toronto
4	August 6	Flames unite and continue in Toronto (central)	
5	August 7	Toronto (south and north) + arrival at opening ceremony	

== See also ==
- 2015 Pan American Games torch relay
