= Lillie Johnson =

Jamaican-Canadian nurse (1922–2025)

Lillie Johnson CM
- Born: 16 March 1922; Saint Ann Parish, Jamaica
- Died: 10 August 2025 (aged 103)
- Occupation: Nurse
- Awards: Order of Canada; Order of Ontario

Lillie Johnson, CM (16 March 1922 – 10 August 2025) was a Jamaican-Canadian nurse and public health advocate. Recognized as the first Black Director of Public Health in Ontario, Johnson's work focused on advocating for patients with sickle cell disease.

== Early life ==
Johnson was born in Saint Ann Parish, Jamaica, the third of nine siblings. She began her career as an elementary school teacher.

== Career ==
At 29 years old, Johnson moved to Edinburgh, Scotland to pursue nursing. Johnson migrated to Ontario, Canada in 1960 to work as a nurse after practicing in England, Jamaica and America.

Johnson became the Director of Nursing Services at Leeds, Grenville, and Lanark District Health Unit in Brockville, Ontario.

Aside from nursing, Johnson also taught a post-diploma certificate course in Child and Maternal Health at Humber College.

In 1981, Johnson founded the Sickle Cell Association of Ontario to provide outreach and advocacy programs not previously available in the region.

== Honours ==
In 2010, Johnson was made a Member of the Order of Ontario for her advocacy work to include screening for sickle cell disease in the universal screening process for newborns.

In 2015, Johnson was a torchbearer for the 2015 Pan American Games held in Toronto, Ontario.

In 2023, Johnson was made a Member of the Order of Canada for her contribution to public health.

== Death ==
Johnson died on 10 August 2025, at the age of 103.
