= Gisèle Gallichan =

Canadian journalist (1946–2025)

- Born: 6 July 1946; Quebec City, Quebec, Canada
- Died: 6 October 2025 (aged 79); Sainte-Pétronille, Quebec, Canada
- Education: Conservatoire d'art dramatique de Québec
- Occupations: Journalist; television presenter
- Spouse: Gilles Normand

Gisèle Gallichan (b. July 6, 1946, Quebec City – d. October 6, 2025, Sainte-Pétronille, Quebec, Canada) was a Canadian journalist and television presenter.

== Life and career ==
Gallichan was born in Quebec City July 6, 1946. She was the daughter of journalist Lionel Gallichan and Alice Boucher. She grew up in Quebec City along with her brother, Gilles, while spending her summers growing up with her grandparents in L'Islet-sur-Mer.

In her youth, Gallichan was attracted to the theatre, entering the Conservatoire d'art dramatique de Québec at the age of 17, where she notably met Winston McQuade and Claude Landré. To pay for her studies, she hosted radio shows at CKCV. She was then drawn towards journalism, seeing it as an appealing challenge. She graduated from the Conservatoire in 1967 and joined CJLR as a parliamentary correspondent in Quebec City. She became the first female journalist in electronic media to be admitted to the Quebec National Assembly press gallery. She covered the Union Nationale leadership race of Jean-Guy Cardinal in 1969 and was press attaché for Minister of Immigration Mario Beaulieu. Following the victory of the Quebec Liberal Party in 1970, she was a press attaché to Pierre Laporte. After a brief hiatus, she returned to the press room in 1971. After following theatre and journalism for several years, she devoted herself entirely to journalism following the Front commun intersyndical de 1972.

In 1976, Gallichan left Parliament Hill and began working on regional radio and television for the Canadian Broadcasting Corporation. Following the 1976 general election, she returned to Parliament Hill, though she was forced into freelance journalism in 1981 following a labor dispute at Radio-Canada. She left the station for good the following year and became public relations director for Rexfor.

In August 1983, Gallichan became co-host of the news television show Aujourd'hui on CFCM-DT. She then joined Radio-Québec, covering the 1994 general election alongside Anne-Marie Dussault. In 1996, she was named cheffe de cabinet for Premier Lucien Bouchard. The following year, she joined the Office of Public Hearings on the Environment. She was a lifetime member of the press office alongside her husband, Gilles Normand, a journalist for La Presse.

Gallichan died in Sainte-Pétronille on 6 October 2025, at the age of 79.
