= Al Valdes =

Canadian football halfback (1935–2025)

Profile
- Position: Halfback

Personal information
- Born: March 14, 1935; Calgary, Alberta, Canada
- Died: February 12, 2025 (aged 89); Calgary, Alberta, Canada
- Listed height: 5 ft 9 in (1.75 m)
- Listed weight: 195 lb (88 kg)

Career information
- High school: Crescent Heights High School

Career history
- 1954–1955: Calgary Bronks Junior
- 1956–1958: Calgary Stampeders

Alan E. Valdes (March 14, 1935 – February 12, 2025) was a Canadian professional football player who played for the Calgary Stampeders.

== Biography ==
Valdes attended Crescent Heights High School in Calgary where he won the league scoring title. He then played junior football for the Calgary Bronks in 1954 and 1955 and was the league's scoring champion and most valuable player in 1954. He was rated one of the fastest men in the junior league and averaged six yards per carry during the 1955 season, tallying 350 rushing yards and 71 receiving yards.

Valdes joined the Calgary Stampeders in 1956 and was the team's leading rusher in 1957, tallying 553 yards on 111 carries. He played in only one game during the 1958 season, sitting out the balance of the season due to business pressures. He announced in July 1959 that he had quit football to devote his efforts to a career in business.

Valdes died in Calgary on February 12, 2025, at the age of 89.
