= Charles Boileau =

French ecclesiastic and preacher

Charles Boileau (French pronunciation: [ʃaʁl bwalo]; born Beauvais, France 1648 – 28 May 1704, Paris) was a French ecclesiastic and preacher.

== Bibliography ==
- Académie française
