= Marvin Tile =

Canadian orthopedic surgeon (1933–2025)

Marvin Tile M.D., FRCS(C), CM
- Born: January 11, 1933; Israel
- Died: August 18, 2025 (aged 92)
- Education: Harbord Collegiate Institute (B.Sc), University of Toronto (MD)
- Occupation: Physician
- Medical career
- Field: Orthopedic surgery
- Institutions: Sunnybrook Health Sciences Center

Marvin Tile CM (January 11, 1933 – August 18, 2025) was a Canadian orthopedic surgeon, Chief of Surgery at Sunnybrook Health Sciences Centre (1985–1996) and University of Toronto professor, who was made a Member of the Order of Canada in 2009. Tile was co-founder of Sunnybrook Hospital Trauma Unit and founding president of the Ontario Orthopedic Association Born in Toronto, Ontario, Tile attended Harbord Collegiate Institute and the University of Toronto where he earned a B.Sc. (Med) and MD degrees in 1957. He received his FRCS(C) in 1963 after which he studied in Europe as a Detweiler Traveling Fellow Tile authored two books and 59 manuscripts "pioneering the practice of orthopedics around the world".

Tile died on August 18, 2025, at the age of 92.

== Books ==
- Fractures of the Pelvis and Acetabulum, 2nd edition, Marvin Tile, published by Williams & Wilkins (1984) ISBN 9780683082494.
- The Rationale of Operative Fracture Care, 3rd edition, Schatzker J and Tile, M, ISBN 9783540277088.
