= Janine O'Leary Cobb =

Canadian women's health activist (1933–2025)

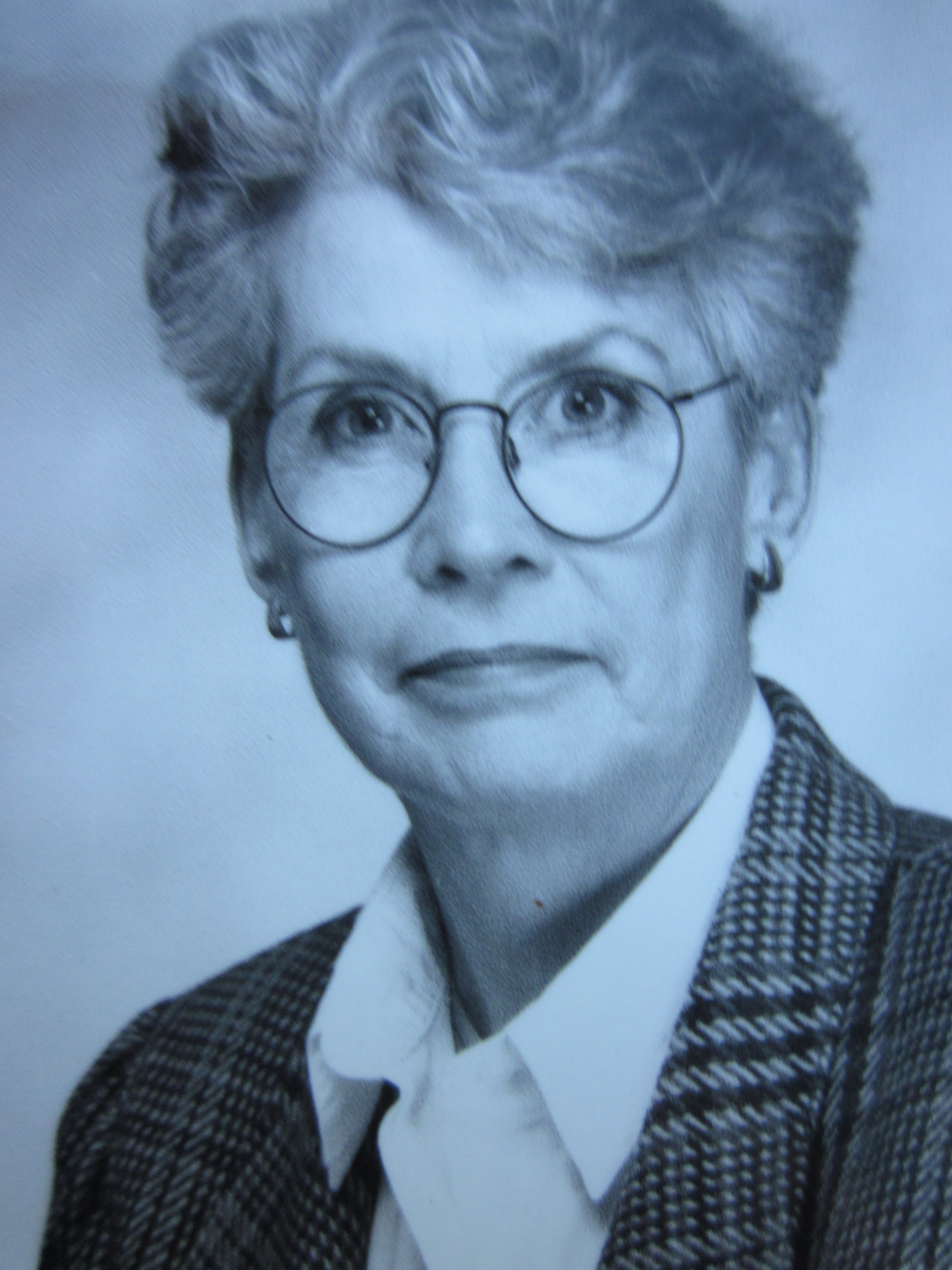
- Born: Janine Patricia O'Leary; June 20, 1933; Montreal, Quebec, Canada
- Died: December 19, 2025 (aged 92); Montreal, Quebec, Canada
- Occupations: Author; health activist
- Spouse: John Cobb (died 2019)
- Writing career
- Genre: Women's health
- Notable works: Understanding Menopause; A Friend Indeed

Janine O'Leary Cobb (June 20, 1933 – December 19, 2025) was a Canadian women's health activist and educator, and the author of one of the first popular books on menopause intended for a mainstream audience.

== Life and career ==
Janine Patricia O'Leary was born on June 20, 1933, in Montreal, the second of five children of Edward Launce and Jeanne (née Poulin) O'Leary. Cobb was recognized as a pioneer in the women's health movement in North America and has won critical recognition for her work in the field.

In 1984, Cobb founded the popular health newsletter, A Friend Indeed, dedicated to highlighting the increasing medicalization of menopause and to breaking the taboo of silence that still hung over many important women's health issues, such as menstruation, menopause and breast cancer. The publication continued to be released bi-monthly under the stewardship of other editors until 2006.

In 1988, Cobb wrote Understanding Menopause.

Cobb was previously a professor with Vanier College in Montreal, and was also a board member and president of Breast Cancer Action Montreal.

Cobb died at a hospital in Montreal from pneumonia on December 19, 2025, at the age of 92.
