= Alia Hogben =

Canadian social worker and activist (1937–2025)

- Born: Alia Abdul Rauf; February 28, 1937; Rangoon, Burma
- Died: June 16, 2025 (aged 88); Brockville, Ontario, Canada
- Citizenship: Canadian
- Education: Carleton University, University of Toronto
- Occupations: Social worker, activist
- Spouse: William Murray Hogben (m. 1959)
- Children: 3
- Awards: Order of Canada (2012)

Alia Hogben (February 28, 1937 – June 16, 2025) was a Canadian social worker and activist who served as the executive director of the Canadian Council of Muslim Women. Hogben was involved with the Canadian Council of Muslim Women since its founding, initially serving as a board member.

== Biography ==
The daughter of a diplomat, Alia Hogben was born in Rangoon, Burma in 1937 but spent her youth in India and in several other countries. Her family eventually moved to Canada, where she settled permanently. She earned a Bachelor of Arts degree at Carleton University in Ottawa, and a master's degree in social work at the University of Toronto. She went on to pursue a professional career in social work and worked in direct services as well as with the Ontario government supervising various social service agencies in South East Ontario. Hogben has also worked in services for children and women who have been abused, and services for adults with developmental disabilities.

She died at a hospital in Brockville, Ontario, on June 16, 2025, at the age of 88.

== Awards and honours ==
In 2012, Hogben became the second Canadian Muslim woman to be awarded the Order of Canada for her work in the area of women's rights. The award citation recognized her for being “an articulate spokesperson for the humane, tolerant and equality-based interpretation of Islam and for interfaith dialogue.” A year earlier, she was awarded an honorary doctorate by Queen's University, in Kingston, Ontario, on the recommendation of the Queen's School of Religion. In 2014, Maclean's Magazine ranked Hogben 24th of the 50 "Most Powerful List" of people in Canada.
