= 2025 Hollow Water First Nation stabbings =

Mass stabbing in Canada

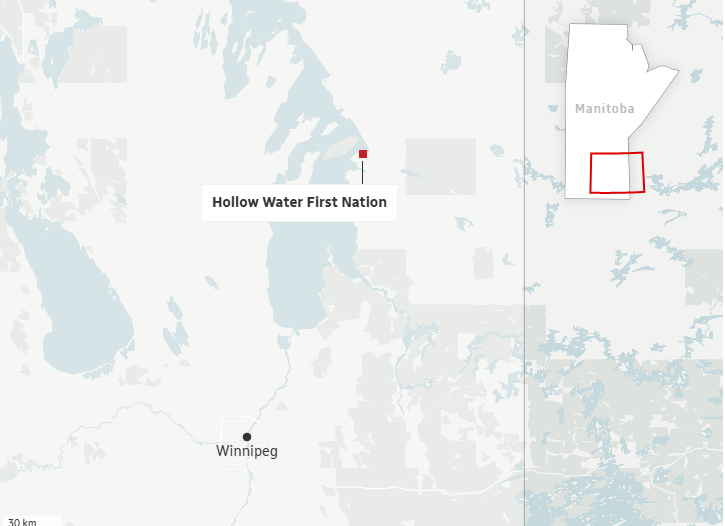
- The location of Hollow Water First Nation
- Location: Hollow Water First Nation, Manitoba, Canada
- Date: 4 September 2025 c.3:15 a.m. – c.6:50 a.m. (Central)
- Target: Community members
- Attack type: Mass stabbing, carjacking
- Weapons: Bladed article, bottle
- Deaths: 2 (including the perpetrator)
- Injuries: 8 (7 by stab wounds)
- Perpetrator: Tyrone Simard
- Motive: Under investigation

On 4 September 2025, mass stabbings at two locations in Hollow Water First Nation killed one person and injured eight others. The perpetrator was also killed while attempting to flee the scene.

== Attack ==
Shortly before the attack, at about 3:00 a.m., the perpetrator went to the house of 60-year-old Michael Raven, asking him for permission to borrow his quad, which Raven rejected. Raven went to sleep and at around 3:15 a.m., the perpetrator returned to Raven's house, broke inside and woke Raven before stabbing him several times and beating him with a bottle. Raven's girlfriend was also attacked and injured.

At 3:45 a.m., a First Nation security officer told the Royal Canadian Mounted Police (RCMP) about the attack in the community about half an hour earlier, saying the suspect fled and medical personnel were needed. About an hour and a half later at 5:53 a.m., RCMP were called about a possible stabbing in the community, and officers from multiple detachments were sent there. Multiple victims suffering from stab wounds were discovered at the scene. Police were then alerted about a second scene, where more victims were found.

At around 6:50 a.m., the perpetrator collided with a Mountie's vehicle while fleeing from the scene appearing to head to Winnipeg in a stolen vehicle, killing himself and critically injuring the driver.

== Aftermath ==
The attack occurred on the third anniversary of the 2022 Saskatchewan stabbings which killed 12 people, including the perpetrator, and injured 17 others in the James Smith Cree Nation Indigenous reserve and in the village of Weldon, Saskatchewan. The RCMP said they believe the date is just a coincidence.

Roads remained closed as the investigation continued. Three houses were cordoned off by police tape as forensic investigators continued their work. A school was also closed.

== Victims ==
Two people, including the perpetrator, were killed and eight others were injured. The injured victims ranged in age between 18 and 60. By 8 September, three victims remained hospitalized while four were discharged. The sole fatality was identified as 18-year-old Marina Simard, the sister of the perpetrator. The perpetrator's aunt Marcelina Bushie was also attacked and injured. Six of the victims were taken to hospital by ambulance, and two others were airlifted by Shock Trauma Air Rescue Service air ambulance. One victim had surgery and another remained in an operating room. A code orange alert, an alert when a hospital needs to prepare for a potential sudden influx of patients, was issued in the hospital.

== Perpetrator ==
The perpetrator was identified as 26-year-old Tyrone Simard (1999 – 4 September 2025), who was known to police and was out on bail at the time of the attack with assault with a weapon and mischief charges for alleged offences that happened 8 June. He was also facing charges of sexual assault, sexual interference and invitation to sexual touching from alleged incidents in 2017. The records show a Winnipeg court granted his release 12 June on both matters with various conditions, including a curfew and an order not to use drugs or alcohol or to possess weapons. The motive behind the attack is unknown, but the police said they are focusing on connections between Simard and each of the victims, who were known to each other. Simard was raised in Hollow Water until he was placed into foster care at age 10 in 2009. He moved between group homes in Winnipeg, before settling into a foster home where he stayed until he aged out of the system. Following his death, Simard was buried at Hollow Water eight days later.

== Reactions ==
The RCMP called the stabbing a "senseless act of violence". Manitoba Premier Wab Kinew called the Mountie who was injured a hero, saying "She stopped a man on a rampage, so on behalf of the province of Manitoba, I thank her". Rob Lasson, the officer in charge of Manitoba RCMP major crime services, said the Mountie responded with courage. Assistant Commissioner Scott McMurchy, commanding officer of RCMP's "D" Division, said "What happened early this morning is a tragedy for the community of Hollow Water First Nation, and all of Manitoba" and "My thoughts are with everyone who was affected by this senseless act of violence". Hollow Water Chief Larry Barker, who said he knew the victims, got emotional as he spoke at the news conference. Grand Chief Jerry Daniels said cellular coverage would help responses to emergencies. Shawn Young, the chief operating officer of Health Sciences Centre, said "It's awful to say this, but this is our work. We receive trauma every single day," adding "Six or seven people is a bit much in a short period of time, but it's our role as leaders to clear a path for folks to be able to assist and treat".

== See also ==
- List of mass stabbing incidents (2020–present)
- 2024 Ottawa stabbing
- 2021 North Vancouver stabbing
- 2020 Quebec City stabbing
- 2014 Calgary stabbing
