= 2025 Alberta teachers' strike =

Public education labour dispute

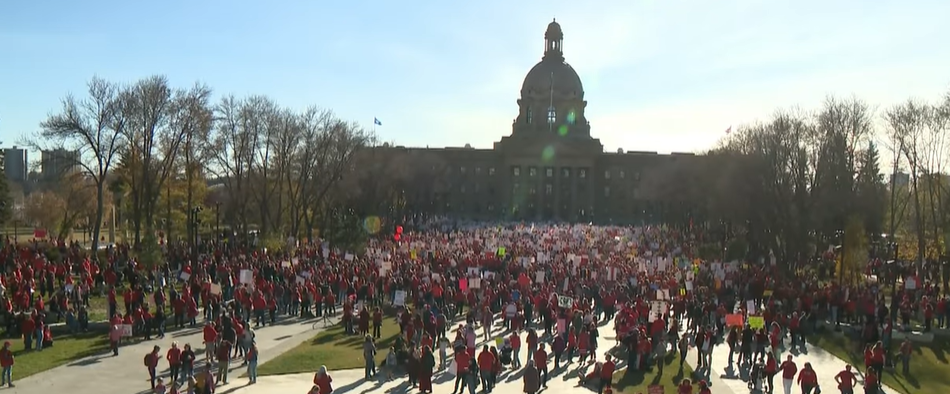
- Strikers rallying at the Alberta Legislature Building
- Date: October 6, 2025 – October 29, 2025 (23 days)
- Location: Alberta, Canada
- Caused by: Disagreements over the terms of a new labour contract
- Goals: Increased pay, class-size reduction, and additional employee benefits
- Result: Alberta's teachers ordered back to work by the Government of Alberta using the Back to School Act and the notwithstanding clause; Alberta's teachers unable to enact strike action until August 31, 2028; Threats of a general strike by the Alberta Federation of Labour (no result)

Parties
Alberta Teachers' Association; Supported by: Alberta Federation of Labour; New Democratic Party	Government of Alberta; Ministry of Education

Lead figures
Jason Schilling	Danielle Smith; Demetrios Nicolaides; Nate Horner

Units involved
51,000 teachers	United Conservative MLAs

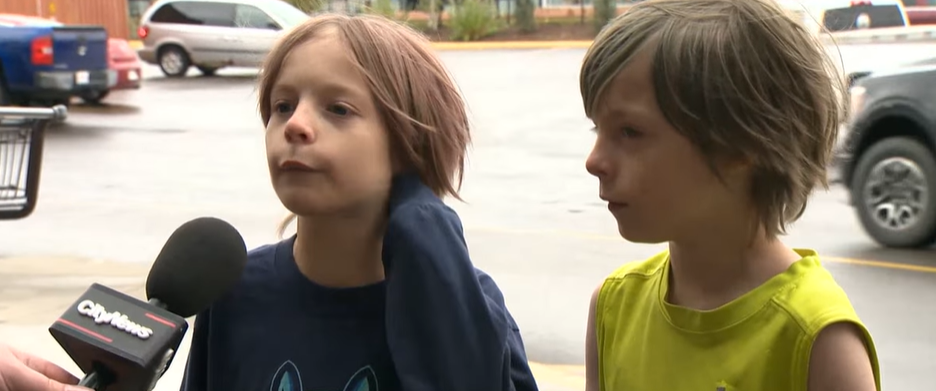
Two children being interviewed about the strike

The 2025 Alberta teachers' strike was a public education teachers' strike and labour dispute that took place across Alberta, Canada, and affected the province's education system, resulting in a suspension of classes from October 6, 2025, to October 29, 2025. It was ended after the Notwithstanding Clause was invoked.

The strike, organized by the Alberta Teachers' Association (ATA), was the result of multiple disagreements with the Government of Alberta over the terms of a new labour contract.

The strike was announced on September 29, 2025, after an offer by the government was declined. The strike began on October 6, 2025, with 51,000 teachers on strike. Due to the strike, all public education classes were cancelled, impacting 730,000 students, and 2,500 public, separate, and francophone schools.

== Background ==
The Alberta Teachers' Association focused on seeking better working conditions, increased pay, and class-size reduction. Many schools reported overcrowded classrooms, with some exceeding 40 students. Underfunding for education in Alberta was also cited as a key contributor to the strike. By the time of the strike, spending per K-12 student was $13,494 in Alberta, the lowest among all provinces in Canada. Alberta also ranked highest in percentage of per-student funding to independent private schools.

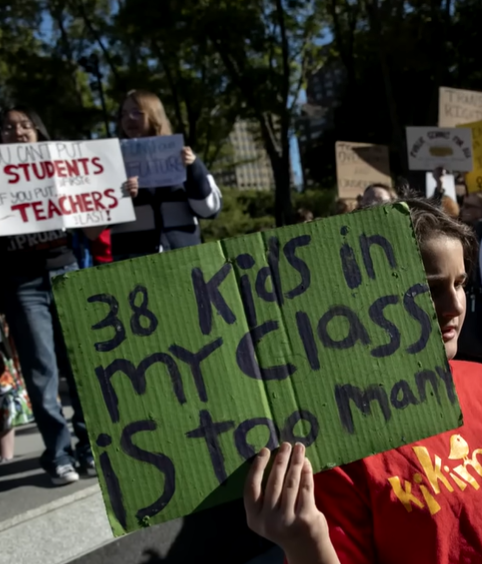
At a rally, with one of the signs saying "38 kids in my class is too many," highlighting concerns about Alberta's overcrowded classrooms.

=== Rallies ===
After the strike announcement, multiple rallies were organized across Alberta (primarily in Calgary and Edmonton), mainly to support educators. A notable rally occurred on October 5, 2025, at the Alberta Legislature Building, where thousands of people attended.

=== Back to School Act passage ===
Alberta's premier, Danielle Smith, ordered teachers back to work on October 29, following the passage of the Back to School Act (Bill 2). Because of this, teachers are not permitted to strike until August 31, 2028, when the legislation expires.

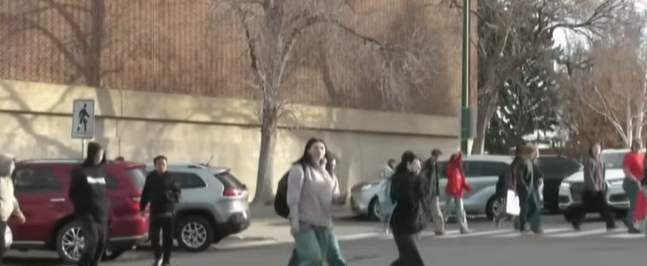
Albertan students participating in walkouts to support teachers.

== Aftermath ==
Gil McGowan, president of the Alberta Federation of Labour, held a press conference following the passing of Bill 2, saying "We will begin the process of organizing towards a potential general strike." He was joined by leaders from the province's other major unions, forming a collective known as the Common Front. Three weeks after McGowan made the claim of organizing towards a general strike, no general strike action had been taken.

=== Student walkouts ===
In response to the passing of Bill 2, thousands of students in schools across the province participated in student walkouts in support of the teachers, mainly in middle and high schools.
