= 2025 Toronto pub shooting =

Mass shooting in Toronto, Canada

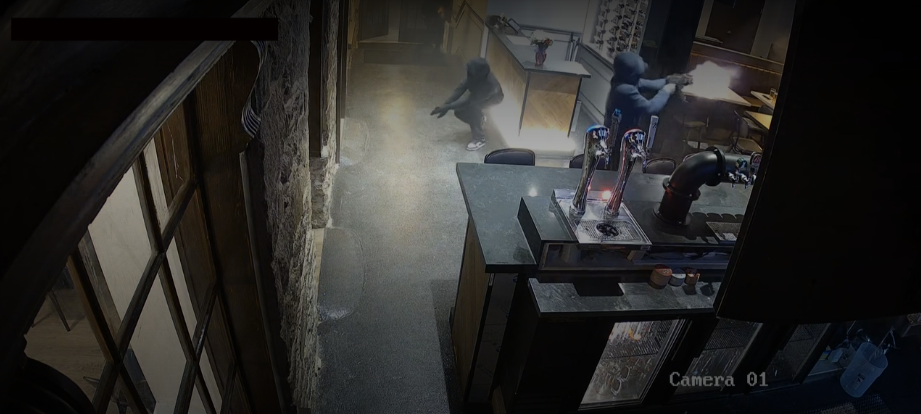
- A still of security camera footage showing the three gunmen inside the building. One can be seen opening fire

- Location of Piper Arms Pub
- Location: 43.7792995°N 79.2571265°W; Piper Arms Pub, Toronto, Ontario, Canada
- Date: March 7, 2025; 10:39 p.m. (UTC−04:00)
- Target: Customers
- Attack type: Mass shooting
- Weapons: AK-47 style carbine; handguns
- Deaths: 0
- Injuries: 12 (9 by gunshots)
- No. of participants: 3
- Motive: Turf war
- Accused: Sheldon Gordon, Juevar Griffith and Kayjean Morrison

On March 7, 2025, 12 people were wounded in a shooting at the Piper Arms Pub, a local pub in the Scarborough district of Toronto, Ontario, Canada. Three masked gunmen carried out the attacks during the pub's opening night just after 10:30 p.m. EST.

Toronto Police superintendent Paul McIntyre said two gunmen had handguns, and one had a semi-automatic sporting rifle.

== Shooting ==
During the opening night of the Piper Arms Pub on the evening of March 7, 2025, three masked gunmen entered the pub with an AK-47 style carbine and handguns, while they "opened fire indiscriminately on the people sitting inside." The shooting was reported at 10:39 pm EST. The suspects then entered a vehicle and drove away.

== Victims ==
The shooting left 12 people injured. 9 victims were struck by gunfire, including an off-duty TTC bus driver, who was shot six times in the legs and groin, while three were injured by other means including by flying glass. No injuries have been reported to be life threatening, but some were described as "life-altering".

== Arrests ==
On June 4, three Toronto citizens identified as 19-year-old Sheldon Gordon, 19-year-old Juevar Griffith and 22-year-old Kayjean Morrison were arrested and charged. Gordon was also charged in connection with shooting incidents that took place over the span of a few hours on March 4.

== Reactions ==
Ontario premier Doug Ford was briefed on the incident and said he will work and assist to have the suspects found and brought to justice.

Toronto mayor Olivia Chow wrote on X (formerly Twitter): "I am deeply troubled to hear reports of a shooting at a pub in Scarborough."

The pub issued a statement on their Instagram account on March 15, 2025 saying: "We are heartbroken over what happened at our Scarborough Town Centre location on what was supposed to be a special opening night for our team and the community. Our thoughts are with everyone affected, and we’re incredibly grateful to first responders and law enforcement for their quick response," adding "This kind of violence has no place in our community."

On March 26, 2025, Toronto councilor Michael Thompson said the three gunmen "appeared young, professional [and] calm" and he had visited the gunshot victims.
