= Dennis Trudeau =

Canadian journalist (1948–2025)

Dennis Trudeau (January 22, 1948 – October 6, 2025) was a Canadian journalist. From 1987 to 2005, he anchored CBC Montreal's main 6pm newscast.

== Life and career ==
Trudeau studied political science and philosophy at the University of Ottawa. He held a journalism degree from the University of Western Ontario. Fluently bilingual, Trudeau started working for the CBC in 1979. He hosted Daybreak on CBC Radio for eight years. He became a national radio host with As It Happens and Cross-Country Checkup during the 1980s.

His journalism career dates back to the 1970s, when he covered Quebec politics for the Montreal Gazette and the former Montreal Star. During his career, he covered major events such as Pierre Elliott Trudeau's funeral, the 1995 Quebec referendum, the January 1998 North American ice storm and the École Polytechnique massacre.

In 2006, he retired from the CBC and became a freelance journalist. During the 2006–2007 season, he was seen participating in the Bazzo.tv show on Télé-Québec. Trudeau died in Montreal on October 6, 2025, at age 77. He had been battling cancer for years.
