= Jim Spenst =

Canadian World War II veteran (1926–2025)

Jim Spenst (1926 – 7 May 2025) was a Canadian World War II veteran. Born in Saskatchewan, Spenst served in the Royal Canadian Army Service Corps after enlisting on November 11, 1943 aged 17 and was discharged in March 1946. He was presented with France's highest honour, the Legion of Honour, in 2023 by French ambassador to Canada Michel Miraillet for his service helping liberate France from the Nazi regime. Following discharge, he coached junior football and baseball, where he also was an umpire. Spenst died on 7 May 2025, at the age of 99.
