= Alberta Teachers' Association =

Canadian trade union

- Abbreviation: ATA
- Formation: 1918; 108 years ago
- Type: Trade union; professional association
- Headquarters: Edmonton, Alberta, Canada
- Location: Alberta, Canada
- Members: 51,000 (2025)
- President: Jason Schilling
- Executive secretary: Dennis Theobald
- Affiliations: Canadian Teachers' Federation
- Website: teachers.ab.ca
- Formerly called: Alberta Teachers' Alliance

The Alberta Teachers' Association (ATA) is the professional association for the teachers of Alberta, Canada. It represents all teachers and teacher administrators in all schools in Alberta's public, separate and francophone school divisions. It also represents teachers in some charter and private schools. There are currently 43,500 members of the ATA. It is affiliated with other teacher organizations in Canada through the Canadian Teachers' Federation.

The Alberta Teachers' Association, as the professional organization of teachers, promotes and advances public education, safeguards standards of professional practice and serves as the advocate for its members.

== History ==
The Alberta Teachers' Alliance was established during the First World War, due to efforts made by John Walker Barnett, Mary Crawford and others. Faced with constant opposition from government and employees, teachers had no basic contractual rights, no guarantee of a minimum wage and no mechanism for appealing dismissals. In addition, they were generally treated poorly in the communities they served. A two-week-long strike by Edmonton teachers in 1921 secured the ATA the right to have access to the sittings of the school boards and some status as the teachers' bargaining unit. Teachers learned during those difficult years that being united and having a dedicated leadership could help them shape the future. The organizing zeal of John Barnett, the first full-time general secretary-treasurer of the Alberta Teachers' Alliance, was the stuff of legend. Barnett's dedication to the profession was recognized when the Association's Edmonton headquarters were named after him.

The Alberta government passed the Teaching Profession Act in 1936, giving a legal foundation to the Alberta Teachers' Association, the new name for the teachers' union. The determination to have teaching recognized as a profession united teachers and became the moral basis for the new organization. Over the next 10 years, the government approved legislation giving teachers a process for appealing dismissals, a pension plan and the right to bargain collectively. In addition, the government established the university as the home for teacher preparation, replacing the former "normal" schools.

In 2002, about 21,000 Alberta teachers went on strike for three weeks. At the time it was said to be the largest strike action in Alberta history.

In October 2025, the first province-wide teachers' strike in Alberta's history began October 6 and ended on 29 October when about 51,000 teachers, members of the ATA, stayed home. The strike affected about 750,000 students in 2500 public, Catholic and francophone schools. The strike was said to be largest in Alberta's history. The trade union did not offer strike pay to its members while they were on strike.

== Past presidents ==
Years	President
1917–19	George D Misener
1919–20	Thomas E A Stanley
1920–22	Hubert C Newland
1922–23	Charles E Peasley
1923–24	John E Somerville
1924–25	William W Scott
1925–26	Frederick Parker
1926–27	Alfred Waite
1927–28	Harry C Sweet
1928–29	Harry D Ainlay
1929–30	Arthur J H Powell
1930–31	Roland D Webb
1931–32	Cedric O Hicks
1932–33	Milton W Brock
1933–34	George A Clayton
1934–35	Edward J Thorlakson
1935–36	Gordon G Harman
1936–37	Eric C Ansley
1937–39	Milton E LaZerte
1939–41	Raymond E Shaul
1941–43	James A Smith
1943–45	Clarence Sansom
1945–47	Harold C Melsness
1947–48	Herbert E Smith
1948–49	Edgar T Wiggins
1949–51	Frederick J C Seymour
1951–53	Marian Gimby
1953–54	Lars Olson
1954–55	Frank J Edwards
1955–56	George S Lakie
1956–57	H J McKim Ross
1957–59	Inez K Castleton
1959–60	Richard F Staples
1960–61	Arthur D G Yates
1961–62	John A McDonald
1962–63	Hugh C McCall
1963–64	Thomas F Rieger
1964–65	L Jean Scott
1965–66	Malcolm W McDonnell
1966–67	Frank W Hoskyn
1967–68	Bernie T Keeler
1968–69	Arthur M Arbeau
1969–71	Ivan P Stonehocker
1971–72	Walter L Hughes
1972–74	Murray Jampolsky
1974–76	Patricia M English
1976–77	Halvar C Jonson
1977–82	K Mac Kryzanowski
1982–84	Arthur V R Cowley
1984–87	Nadene M Thomas
1987–90	Brendan D Dunphy
1990–93	Frances M Savage
1993–99	Bauni M Mackay
1999–2003	Larry Booi
2003–09	Frank Bruseker
2009–13	Carol Henderson
2013–17	Mark Ramsankar
2017–19	Greg Jeffery
2019–Present	Jason Schilling

== Specialist councils ==
The ATA features a range of specialist councils created to foster professional development of teachers interested in common curriculum or specialty areas. The current councils are:

- Alberta School Library Council
- Career and Technology Studies Council
- Le Conseil francais
- Council on School Administration
- Early Childhood Education Council
- Educational Technology Council
- English as a Second Language Council
- English Language Arts Council
- Fine Arts Council
- Global Environmental and Outdoor Education Council
- Guidance Council
- Health and Physical Education Council
- Intercultural and Second Languages Council
- Mathematics Council
- Middle Years Council
- Outreach Education Council
- Religious and Moral Education Council
- Science Council
- Social Studies Council
- Council for Inclusive Education
