= Alban D'Amours =

Canadian businessman (1940–2025)

- Born: 9 July 1940; Sainte-Françoise, Quebec, Canada
- Died: 9 November 2025 (aged 85)
- Education: Université Laval (BA, MA); University of Minnesota (PhD)
- Occupation: Businessman

Alban D'Amours (9 July 1940 – 9 November 2025) was a Canadian businessman.

After his studies at the Université Laval and the University of Minnesota, he worked as a professor at the Université de Sherbrooke. He was also an official in the Government of Quebec. From 2000 to 2008, he was president of the Desjardins Group.

D'Amours died on 9 November 2025, at the age of 85.

== Distinctions ==
- Médaille Gloire de l'Escolle (1999)
- Grand Officer of the National Order of Quebec (2008)
- Member of the Order of Canada (2012)
