= Jacques Nadeau =

Canadian photojournalist (1953–2025)

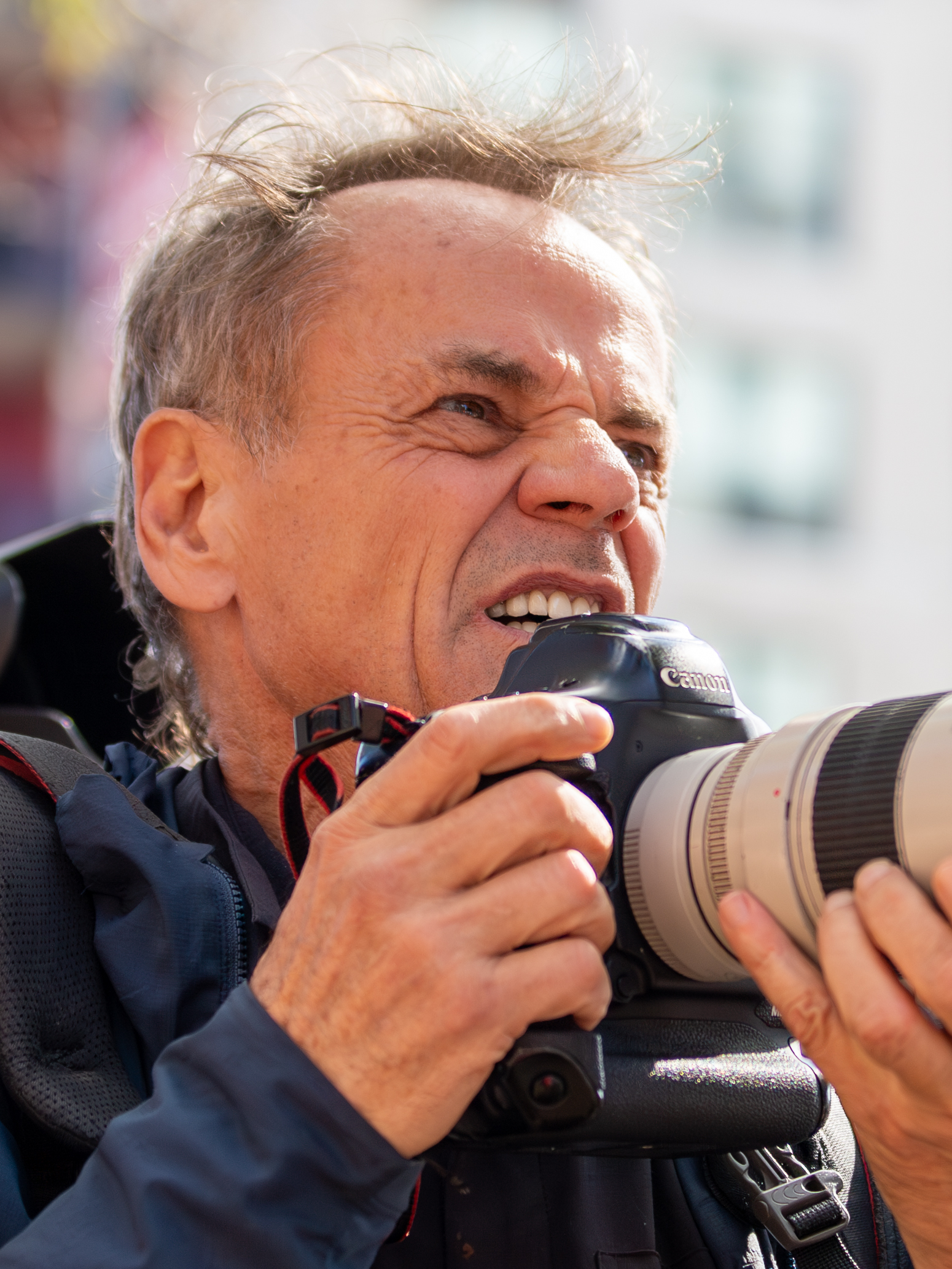
- Nadeau in 2019
- Born: 5 March 1953; Quebec City, Quebec, Canada
- Died: 10 December 2025 (aged 72); Montreal, Quebec, Canada
- Occupations: Photographer; Journalist

Jacques Nadeau (5 March 1953 – 10 December 2025) was a Canadian photojournalist and teacher. He worked with the newspaper company Le Devoir in the 1990s.

== Early life and career ==
Jacques Nadeau was born in La Cité-Limoilou, Quebec City, Canada on 5 March 1953. He was the brother of Michel Nadeau, who also worked as the photojournalist for Le Devoir.

He graduated in media arts and technology at Cégep de Jonquière.

Nadeau worked at Le Devoir as a photojournalist, and periodically contributed to The Canadian Press, The Globe and Mail, The New York Times and several other Canadian, and American media outlets.

In July 2015, Nadeau had his five hard drives containing over 100,000 images stolen, during his 35 years of working. He eventually restored the pictures with the support of organizations and magazines he had worked for that he was able to reconstruct a third of his collection.

== Illness and death ==
Nadeau died of widespread cancer in Montreal, on 10 December 2025, at the age of 72.
