= Cosimo Filane =

Canadian musician and businessman (1939–2025)

Cosimo Filane-Figliomeni (January 25, 1939 – December 19, 2025) was a Canadian musician and businessperson.

== Life and career ==
=== Early life and education ===
Cosimo Figliomeni chose the stage name "Filane" by using the first syllable of his last name and the last name of his favorite singer, Frankie Laine.

=== Career ===
Filane completed six albums, recorded in Toronto and in the United States. Some of his tracks were featured on the prestigious CHUM Charts, including his single "My Girl" (#43). His first album was released in 1966 and most recent album released in 2020. In 1999, he was featured on the Canadian Broadcasting Corporation documentary series "A Scattering of Seeds", and in 2002 on the CBC series Personal Best.

He was the author of a novel on minor hockey and, in 2009, was named an "RBC Regional Hockey Leader" for his volunteer work with amateur hockey in northwestern Ontario. The Filane family operated several businesses in Schreiber, Ontario: the Cosiana Inn, the Fallen Rock Resort, Hollywood Filane Sportswear & Boxing Gym, Filane's Can-op & Variety, Filane's Dollar 'n' More, Filane's Food Market and Filane's Natural Spring Water.

=== Personal life and death ===
Cosimo and his wife had eight children, one being Domenic. He died in Terrace Bay, Ontario on December 19, 2025 at the age of 86.

== Discography ==
- Small Town Boy (Troika Publishing, 1966)
- This Is It! (Fallen Rock, 1973)
- Love Me the Way That I Am (Fallen Rock, 1978)
- I'm Gonna Try it Again!(Fallen Rock, 1983)
- I Like It! (Fallen Rock, 2011)
- Forget About It! (Cosiana Music, 2020)

== Published works ==
- You Can't Win Them All (Fallen Rock Productions and Cosiana Music, 1986)
