= Terry Wilson (defensive back) =

Canadian football player (1942–2025)

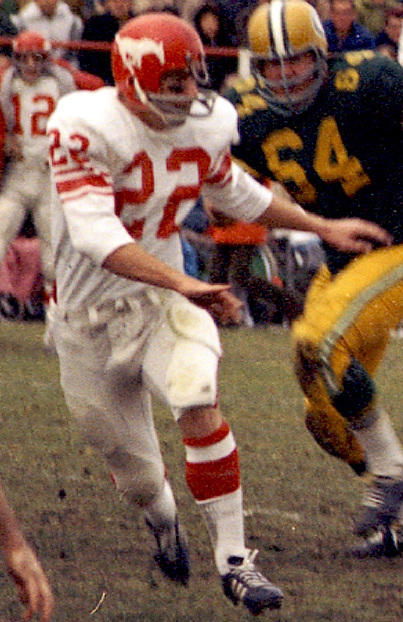
- Wilson with the Calgary Stampeders in 1970

No. 22
- Positions: Halfback, End, Defensive back

Personal information
- Born: 1942; Montreal, Quebec, Canada
- Died: March 5, 2025 (aged 83)
- Listed height: 6 ft 1 in (1.85 m)
- Listed weight: 200 lb (91 kg)

Career information
- College: Stanford

Career history
- 1964–1967: Edmonton Eskimos
- 1968–1972: Calgary Stampeders

Awards and highlights
- Grey Cup champion (1971)

Terry Wilson (1942 – March 5, 2025) was a Canadian professional football player for the Calgary Stampeders and Edmonton Eskimos of the Canadian Football League (CFL). He won the Grey Cup with Calgary in 1971. He played college football for the Stanford Cardinal.

Wilson was born in 1942 in Montreal, but moved to San Francisco as a child. He died after a long illness on March 5, 2025, at the age of 83.
