= Fleg (cartoonist) =

Canadian editorial cartoonist (1963–2025)

- Born: Christian Daigle; 1963; Lévis, Quebec, Canada
- Died: August 1, 2025 (aged 62); Quebec City, Quebec, Canada
- Education: Cégep de Rivière-du-Loup
- Occupation: Editorial cartoonist

Christian Daigle (1963 – August 1, 2025), better known by his pen name Fleg, was a Canadian editorial cartoonist. He notably created caricatures for Yahoo! Québec and Le Soleil and also practised sculpture. A permanent collection of his caricatures can be found at the McCord Stewart Museum in Montreal. In 2014, he received an honourable mention at the Concours international d’arts visuels.

Fleg died from pancreatic cancer in Quebec City, on August 1, 2025, at the age of 62.
