= Grégoire Girard =

Canadian politician (1925–2025)

Mayor of Saint-Hyacinthe
- In office 1971–1976
- Preceded by: Léon Nichols
- Succeeded by: Pierre-André Hamel

Personal details
- Born: 12 March 1925 Sainte-Rosalie, Quebec, Canada
- Died: 10 February 2025 (aged 99) Saint-Hyacinthe, Quebec, Canada
- Party: Progressive Conservative
- Education: Université de Montréal (BA); Université Laval (Dip. Surv.)
- Occupation: Surveyor

Grégoire Girard (12 March 1925 – 10 February 2025) was a Canadian surveyor and politician of the Progressive Conservative Party.

== Life and career ==
Born in Sainte-Rosalie on 12 March 1925, Girard was the son of Conrad Girard and Florence Labonté. He attended secondary school at the Séminaire de Saint-Hyacinthe before earning a Bachelor of Arts from the Université de Montréal in 1945. In 1948, he earned a Diploma of Surveying from the Université Laval in 1948.

On 18 September 1950, Girard married Mariette Arteau. They first settled in Ottawa before moving to Hull, where he began his career as a surveyor. In 1951, he opened his first office in Saint-Hyacinthe. He then taught classes at the Université de Montréal. He also taught at the Université Laval and logged 21,043 minutes of surveying throughout his career. In 1951, he joined the Ordre des Arpenteurs-Géométres du Québec, of which he served as president from 1970 to 1971. He was also active with the Président du Club des Francs and the Chambre de Commerce. In 1971, he became mayor of Saint-Hyacinthe, serving a five-year term. In 1976, the city consolidated, merging with Saint-Joseph, La Providence, and Douville. In 1979, he ran as a Progressive Conservative in the riding of Saint-Hyacinthe—Bagot, but was defeated by Marcel Ostiguy.

Girard died in Saint-Hyacinthe on 10 February 2025, at the age of 99.

== Publications ==
- Survey Law in Canada (1989)
- Le certificat de localisation (1993)
- Précis de droit de l’arpentage au Québec (1993)
- Les Opérations cadastrales et l'urbanisme (1994)
- Droit cadastral (2005)
- Diocèse de Saint-Hyacinthe
