= 2015 Pan American Games torch relay =

- Host city: Toronto, Canada
- Countries visited: Canada
- Distance: 20,000 km
- Torch bearers: 3,000
- Start date: May 30, 2015
- End date: July 10, 2015

The 2015 Pan American Games torch relay was a 41-day torch run, occurring from May 30 to July 10, 2015, being held prior to the start of the Games. The relay brought the torch from Mexico to the Pan American Ceremonies Venue for the opening ceremony.

An application period for Canadians to carry the torch opened in October 2014 and continued till December. Anyone aged 13 or older as of May 30, 2015 was eligible to become a torchbearer. Most of the torchbearers were selected by a random selection, while the others were selected by torch relay communities and games partners.

The torch took a 41-day journey after being lit in May 2015 at the pyramids of Teotihuacan, Mexico. The torch was brought through a total of 130 communities, mostly in Ontario (with five outside the province, Richmond, Winnipeg, Calgary, Halifax and Montreal). The torch was carried by about 3,000 torchbearers and travel approximately 20,000 kilometres (12,000 mi). The relay began on May 30, 2015 in Toronto and finished on July 10, the date of the opening ceremony.

The detailed torch relay route and celebration sites were announced on February 24, 2015. The torch arrived in Toronto and then headed to Thunder Bay, before visiting all other communities on the route. The relay also visited five National Historic Sites of Canada, six Canadian Forces bases and one provincial park. There were 180 celebrations across the torch relay route.

== Route ==
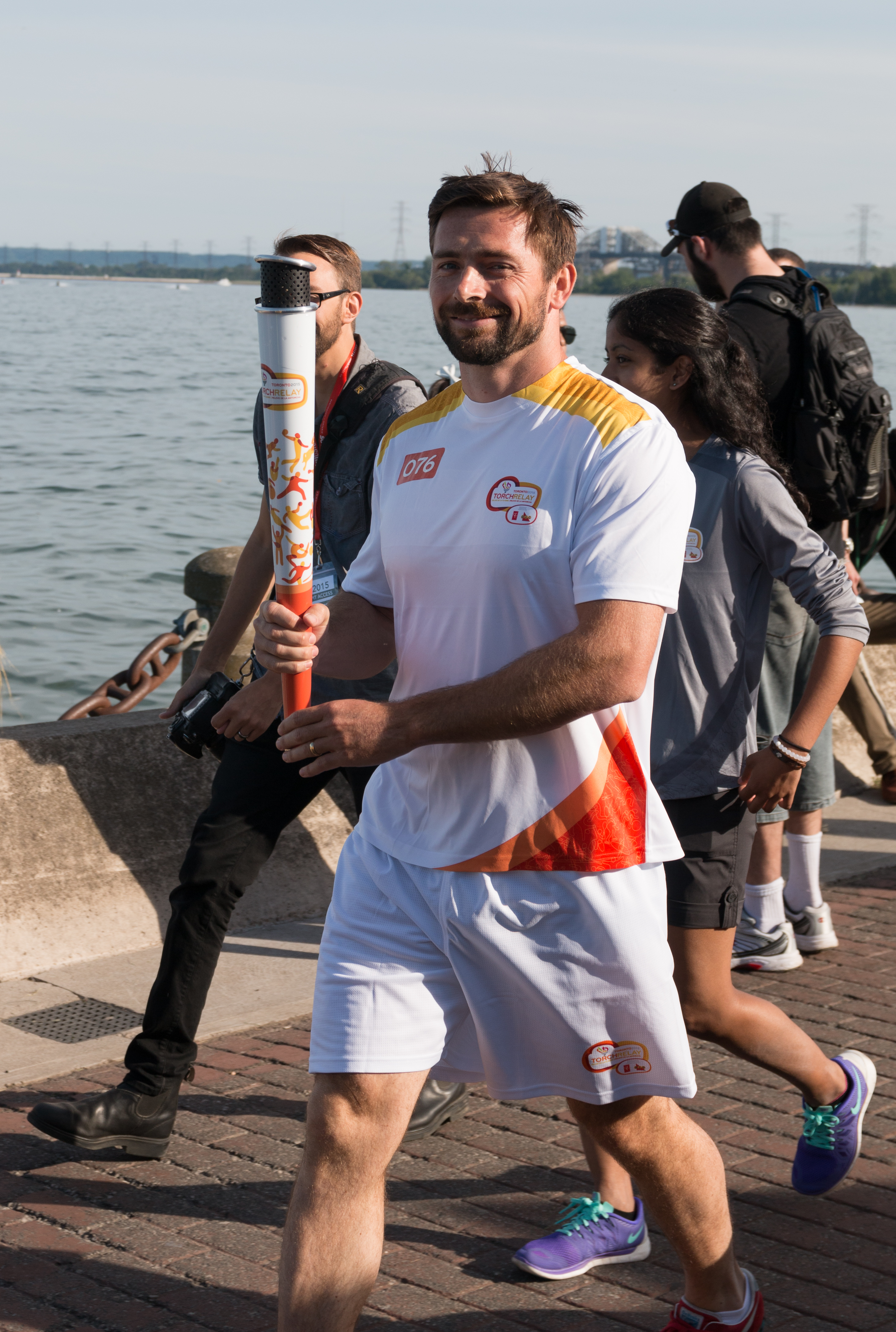
Mark Oldershaw carrying the torch

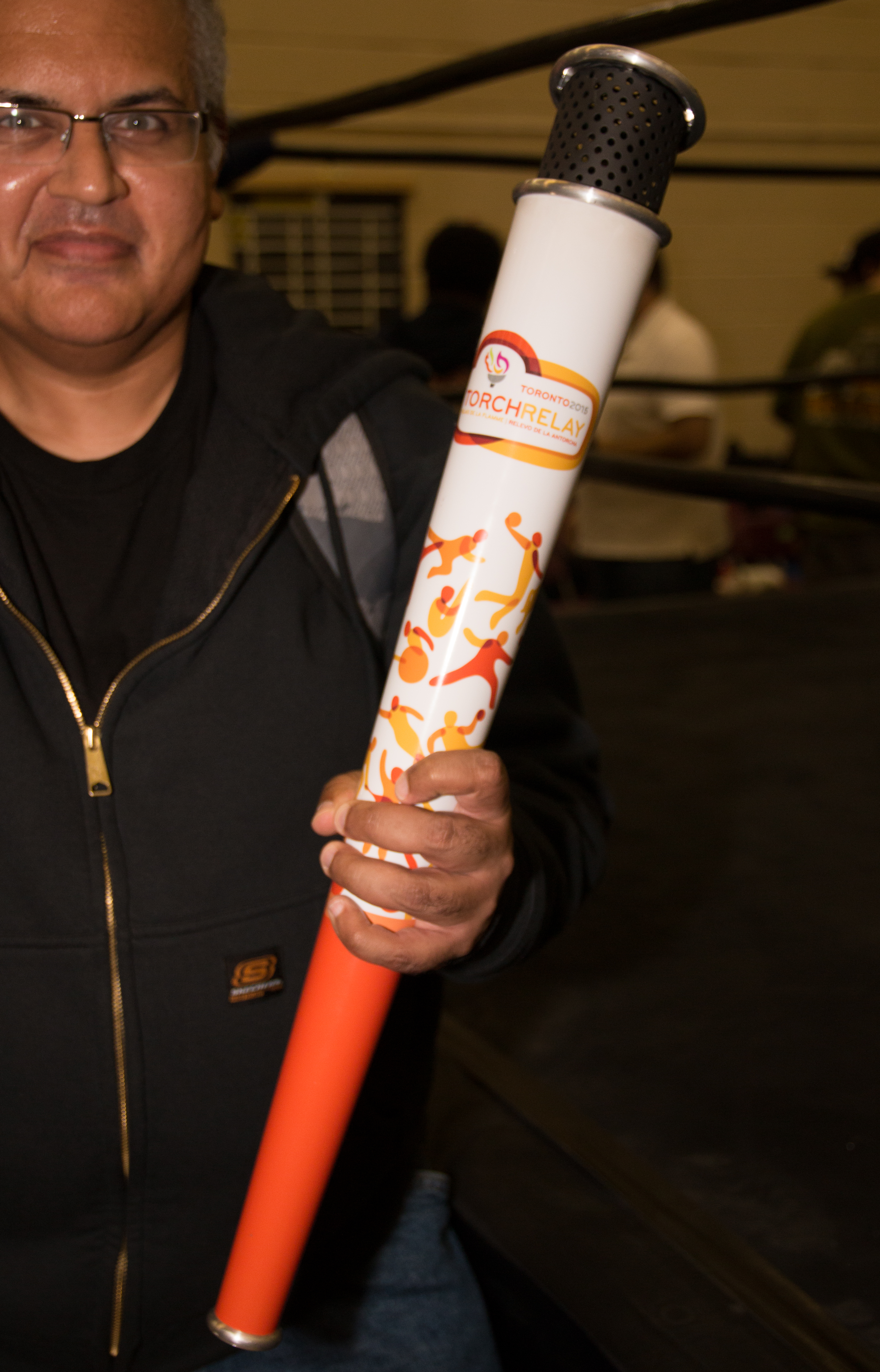
An example of one of the torches from the 2015 Pan American Games

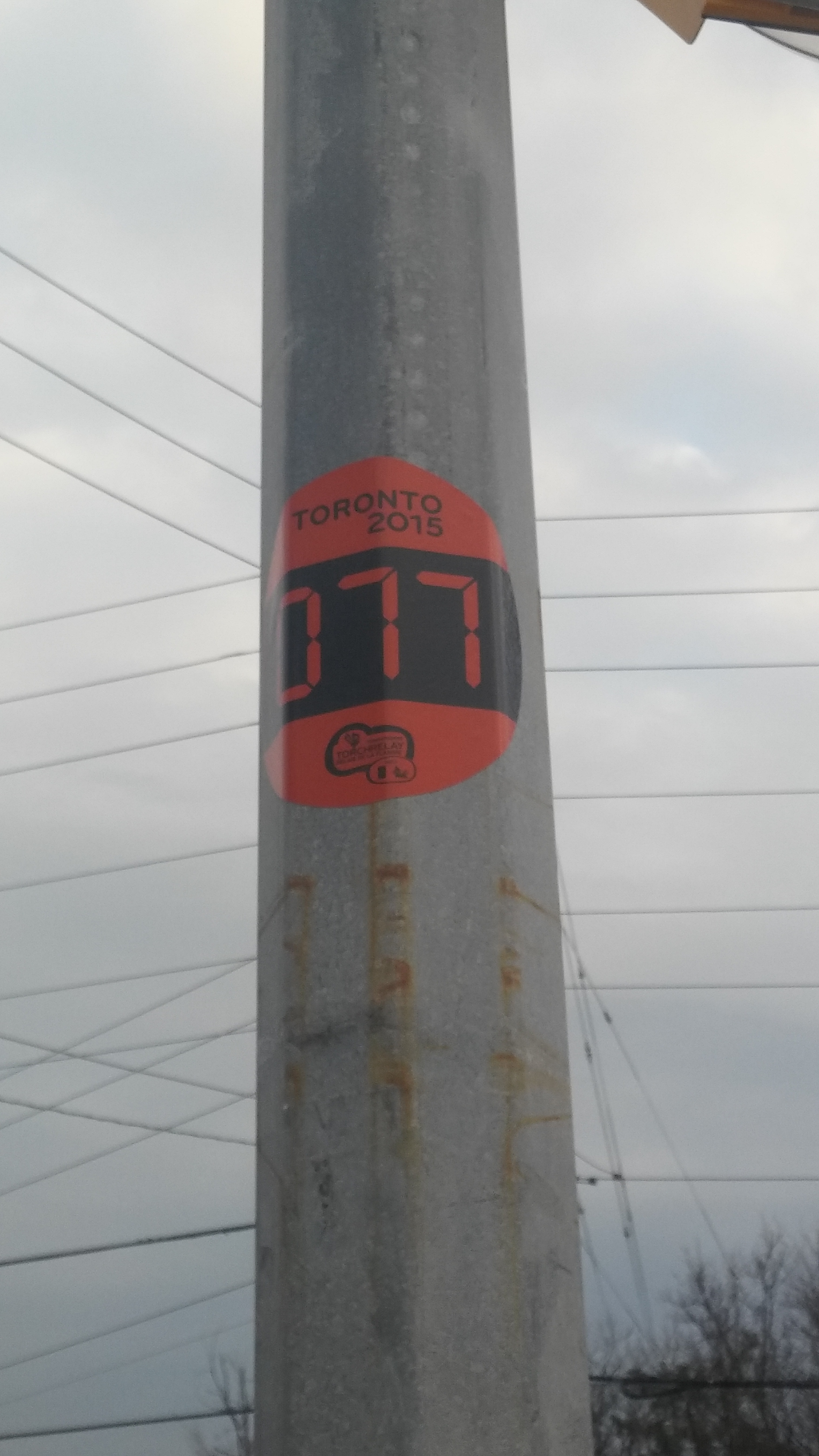
One of the many torch relay route markers

All cities in the Province of Ontario, unless otherwise noted in italics.

Day	Date	Cities	Notable torchbearers
1	May 30	Arrival ceremony in Toronto	Chris Hadfield–astronaut; Rosie MacLennan–trampolinist
2	May 31	Fort William First Nation, Thunder Bay, Nipigon, Terrace Bay, Marathon, White River, Wawa	Curt Harnett–cyclist
3	June 1	Wawa, Sault Ste. Marie	Kalle Mattson–singer; Chris Simon–hockey player Brad Jacobs–curler; Jessica Tuomela–swimmer; Mac Marcoux–alpine skier
4	June 2	Sault Ste. Marie, Bruce Mines, Thessalon, Blind River, Serpent River First Nation, Massey, Espanola, Little Current, Sudbury	Tessa Bonhomme–hockey player
5	June 3	Sudbury, Sturgeon Falls, North Bay, Powassan, South River, Sundridge, Huntsville	Dara Howell–freestyle skier
6	June 4	Algonquin Provincial Park, Algonquin, Huntsville, Minden Hills, Lindsay, Omemee, Peterborough Lift Lock, Peterborough	Ron Ellis–hockey player
7	June 5	Peterborough, Bowmanville, Courtice, Oshawa	Gino Vendetti–Paralympic athlete and powerlifter
8	June 6	Ajax	Nigel Wilson–baseball player
9	June 7	Citadel Hill, Halifax, CFB Halifax (All three in Nova Scotia)	Mark de Jonge–kayaker; Andrew Nicholson–basketball player Laura Pomeroy–swimmer
10	June 8	Whitby, Brooklin, Port Perry, Uxbridge, Beaverton, Orillia	–
11	June 9	Orillia, Gravenhurst, Bracebridge, Parry Sound	–
12	June 10	Parry Sound, Waubaushene, Victoria Harbour, Port McNicoll, Midland, Penetanguishene, Oro-Medonte, Barrie	Emily Batty–mountain biker Adam Dixon–sledge hockey player Glenn Howard–curler
13	June 11	Innisfil, CFB Borden, Stayner, Collingwood, Meaford, Owen Sound	Larisa Yurkiw–alpine skier
14	June 12	Owen Sound, Markdale, Flesherton, Shelburne, Alliston, Beeton, Mono, Orangeville	Jessica Phoenix–equestrian riderBrian Price–rower
15	June 13	Orangeville, Palgrave, Bolton, Inglewood, Belfountain, Alton, Caledon East	Peter Holland–hockey player
16	June 14	Mississauga, Port Credit, Richmond (British Columbia)	Hazel McCallion–politician; Simon Whitfield–triathlete
–	June 15	Not travelling	–
17	June 16	Sarnia, Aamjiwnaang First Nation, Wallaceburg, Chatham-Kent, Tecumseh, Windsor	Mary Spencer–boxer
18	June 17	Windsor, Essex, Leamington, Point Pelee National Park, Pelee, St. Thomas, London	Christine Nesbitt–speed skater Damian Warner–athlete
19	June 18	London, Ingersoll, Woodstock, Tavistock, Stratford, Waterloo, Kitchener	Mandy Bujold–boxer
20	June 19	Kitchener, Cambridge, Brantford, Mississaugas of the New Credit First Nation, Burlington	J. R. Fitzpatrick–NASCAR driver Mark Oldershaw–canoer
21	June 20	Welland, St. Catharines, Port Dalhousie, Niagara Falls	Jessica McDonald–wrestler
22	June 21	Winona, Stoney Creek, Hamilton, Ancaster, Dundas, Waterdown, Hamilton	Nick Bontis–soccer player, coach, executive Sue Palmer-Komar–cyclist
23	June 22	Hamilton, CFB Winnipeg, The Forks, Winnipeg, Winnipeg (Last three in Manitoba)	Melanie Booth–soccer player Jon Montgomery; Darnell Nurse–hockey player
24	June 23	Milton, Oakville, Brampton	Steve Bauer–cyclist; Travis Gerrits–freestyle skier
25	June 24	Brampton, Kleinburg, Woodbridge, Vaughan, Thornhill, Richmond Hill	Andi Petrillo-broadcaster; Elvis Stojko–figure skater
26	June 25	Richmond Hill, Aurora, King, Newmarket	Trish Stratus–professional wrestler
27	June 26	Newmarket, Sharon, Holland Landing, Bradford West Gwillimbury, Keswick, Mount Albert, Whitchurch–Stouffville	Karen Cockburn–trampolinist
28	June 27	Markham, Unionville, Thornhill, Markham	–
29	June 28	Montreal (in Quebec)	Alexandre Bilodeau–freestyle skier
30	June 29	CFB Petawawa, Ontario	–
31	June 30	Gatineau (in Quebec), Ottawa	Arlene Dickinson–author
32	July 1	Kanata, Barrhaven	–
33	July 2	Orleans, Carleton Place, Smiths Falls, Rideau Canal, Smiths Falls, Brockville, Gananoque, Fort Henry, Kingston	Brooke Henderson–golfer
34	July 3	Calgary (in Alberta), CFB Kingston, Kingston, Odessa, Napanee, Deseronto, Tyendinaga First Nation, Belleville	Kyle Shewfelt–gymnast
35	July 4	CFB Trenton, Trenton, Brighton, Colborne, Cobourg, Toronto (south)	–
36	July 5	Toronto (east)	Dwayne De Rosario–soccer player Wayne Simmonds–hockey player
37	July 6	Toronto (east and west)	Patrick Chan–figure skater Jamaal Magloire–basketball player
38	July 7	Toronto (west and north)	–
39	July 8	Toronto (north and central)	Jim Cuddy–singer; Eva Avila–singer
40	July 9	Toronto (central and south)	
41	July 10	Toronto (central and south) + arrival at opening ceremony	–

== See also ==
- 2015 Parapan American Games torch relay
