= Office of Public Hearings on the Environment =

Agency of the Government of Quebec, Canada

- Bureau d'audiences publiques sur l'environnement
- Abbreviation: BAPE
- Formation: December 21, 1978; 47 years ago
- Type: Government agency
- Headquarters: 140, Grande Allée Est Québec
- Location: Canada
- Methods: Information; Mediation; Consultant
- President: Alain R. Roy
- Expenses: 5,6 M$ (April 2022 - March 2023)
- Staff: 45 (31 March 2023)
- Website: http://www.bape.gouv.qc.ca/

The Office of Public Hearings on the Environment (French: Bureau d'audiences publiques sur l'environnement, abbreviated as BAPE) is an agency of the Government of Quebec, established in 1978. It operates under the authority of the Ministry of the Environment and the Fight Against Climate Change. The agency’s mission is to inform and consult the public, investigate assigned cases, and provide the minister with analyses and recommendations to guide government decision-making. These recommendations integrate the 16 principles of sustainable development, addressing the ecological, social, and economic aspects of various projects. The Office of Public Hearings on the Environment enables citizens to access information and express their views on projects subject to the environmental impact assessment and review process outlined in the Environment Quality Act. It also addresses broader environmental issues that may impact communities or quality of life, as mandated under Section 6.1 and subsequent provisions of the EQA.

The agency most frequently reviews projects involving transportation infrastructure, energy developments (such as power lines, wind farms, dams, and pipelines), mining industries, and waste management. It also conducts broader "generic" mandates on topics like hazardous waste, public forest management, residual materials, water management, pork production, shale gas, uranium extraction, and asbestos management.

== Role ==
The Office of Public Hearings on the Environment was established in 1978, following a wave of environmental legislation inspired by the United States’ National Environmental Policy Act of 1969. In Quebec, the Environment Quality Act was enacted in 1972, with an environmental impact assessment and review process introduced by 1975.

In addition to standard elements of such processes, Gariépy, Soubeyran & Domon (1986) highlight three distinctions from American practices:

- Designation of specific project categories subject to the process;
- Involvement of the Ministry of the Environment in managing and issuing directives defining the scope of impact studies;
- Creation of a semi-autonomous body—the Office of Public Hearings on the Environment—to gather public input and deliver findings and recommendations to the government.

According to these authors, this framework places stricter demands on project proponents, (Note: In Quebec’s impact studies, the project proponent is referred to as the "promoteur" or "initiateur.") requiring them to propose environmentally responsible projects and respond to citizen concerns.

== History ==
The BAPE was formally established in December 1978, following a foundational report on the proposed Dufferin-Montmorency Autoroute along Beauport Bay in Quebec City.

In its first two years, the agency worked to earn the confidence of major public-sector stakeholders, including the Ministry of Transport and Sustainable Mobility, the Ministry of Natural Resources and Forests, and Hydro-Québec. In 1980, the government adopted regulations governing impact assessments and public hearing procedures. By March 31, 1981, the Office of Public Hearings on the Environment had conducted two general inquiries and three inquiries with public hearings.

== Processes ==
=== Public information period ===
The 30-day public information period seeks to educate communities about a project and its potential impacts. During this phase, individuals, groups, organizations, or municipalities may request a public consultation or mediation from the Minister of the Environment and the Fight Against Climate Change. To facilitate participation, the Office of Public Hearings on the Environment sets up a consultation center in the affected region and hosts a public information session. At this session, the project proponent presents their proposal, and the agency explains the environmental assessment process and its role, followed by a question-and-answer period.

=== Public hearing ===
A public hearing occurs after the information period if a non-frivolous request is approved by the minister. The agency’s president appoints an inquiry commission to carry out the mandate and prepare a report for the minister. These commissions have investigative authority, enabling them to question relevant parties and request documents for analysis.

=== Targeted consultation ===
For projects involving limited or localized concerns, the Office of Public Hearings on the Environment (BAPE) may implement a three-month consultation process. This streamlined procedure consists of a single phase during which participants may submit questions and present their views. Commissioners perform equivalent functions to those in standard public hearings, though within this condensed framework.

=== Mediation ===
Mediation, a two-month conflict resolution process, employs negotiation to reconcile differences. It is advantageous when a project’s justification is uncontested, and disputes appear resolvable through dialogue.

=== Ministerial mandates ===
The Minister of the Environment holds statutory authority to refer environmental quality investigations to the BAPE, with discretion to determine whether public sessions are required. These ministerial mandates may address sector-wide issues (e.g., industrial agricultural practices) or geographically specific concerns. Additional referral mechanisms exist under complementary legislation, including the Natural Heritage Conservation Act, with procedural requirements tailored to each legislative framework.

=== Decision ===
Upon concluding an investigation, the BAPE submits its report to the Minister of the Environment. For projects subject to environmental assessment under Division IV.1 of the Environment Quality Act, the Minister must make the report public within 15 days of receipt. The BAPE's role remains advisory, as final project authorization rests with the Conseil des ministres following the Minister's recommendations.

=== Criticism ===
The BAPE holds a recognized role in Quebec’s environmental assessment process. Observers note that while the process includes public participation, the procedural framework requires project proponents to assume primary responsibility for evidentiary submissions. This structure emerges after projects have already undergone technical definition through preliminary studies.

Academic analyses by researchers Mario Gauthier and Louis Simard have examined two aspects of Quebec's public consultation procedures: their capacity for institutional learning from experiences and their procedural formality. Their studies indicate that the Office of Public Hearings on the Environment (BAPE) has developed limited formal mechanisms for systematically integrating lessons from previous hearings. Project proponents have observed that similar discussion topics frequently recur across different hearings. Research suggests that improved integration of past consultation outcomes could potentially increase efficiency during the impact study phase.

The second aspect identified in analyses of Quebec's consultation process relates to its procedural formality. The BAPE employs methods frequently characterized as quasi-judicial, including specific spatial configurations, formal inquiry procedures, structured question-and-answer sessions, and bifurcated hearing phases. These elements, combined with commissioners' statutory investigative authority, establish a framework that differs from informal discussion formats. Researchers note this structure may limit adaptability to project-specific circumstances.

Finally, in contrast to the earlier critiques, some believe that Quebec’s consensus culture hampers efficiency. By systematically subjecting all projects to public consultation, the implementation of projects beneficial to Quebec could be delayed. This was one critique made by André Caillé in a media statement in November 2006. He claimed that “the agency paralyzes all development attempts in Quebec.” Some criticize the contentious nature of debates, which sometimes lead to stalemates. There seems to be a trend toward more closed, consensus-oriented participatory mechanisms, emerging to mitigate or bypass conflicts and make public participation more predictable.

== Presidents ==
The following individuals have served as president of the Office of Public Hearings on the Environment since its inception:

- 1979–1982: Michel Lamontagne
- 1982–1983: P.-Réal L'Heureux
- 1983–1987: André Beauchamp
- 1987–1989: Victor C. Goldbloom
- 1990: Michel Dorais
- 1991–1995: Bertrand Tétreault
- 1995–1997: Claudette Journault
- 1997–2005: André Harvey
- 2005–2007: William Cosgrove
- 2007–2012: Pierre Renaud
- 2012–2017: Pierre Baril
- 2017–2022: Philippe Bourke
- 2022–2023: Marie-Hélène Gauthier (interim)
- 2023–present: Alain R. Roy

== See also ==
- Ministry of the Environment and the Fight Against Climate Change
- Participatory democracy

== Bibliography ==
- Gariépy, Michel; Soubeyran, Olivier; Domon, Gérard (1986). "Planification environnementale et étude d'impact sur l'environnement au Québec : implantation d'une procédure et apprentissage des acteurs" [Environmental planning and environmental impact assessment in Quebec: implementing a procedure and learning from the players]. Cahiers de géographie du Québec (in French). 30 (79): 21–40. doi:10.7202/021768ar.
- Gauthier, Mario; Simard, Louis (2007). "Le BAPE et l'institutionnalisation du débat public au Québec : mise en œuvre et effets" [BAPE and the institutionalization of public debate in Quebec: implementation and effects]. Le débat public : une expérience française de démocratie participative [Public debate: a French experiment in participatory democracy]. La Découverte. ISBN 9782707153418.
- Gauthier, Mario; Simard, Louis (2011). "Le Bureau d'audiences publiques sur l'environnement du Québec : genèse et développement d'un instrument voué à la participation publique" [Quebec's Office of Public Hearings on the Environment: the genesis and development of an instrument dedicated to public participation] (PDF). Télescope (in French). 17 (1): 39–67.
