= Claude Boileau =

Canadian ice hockey player (1933–2025)

Claude Louis Joseph Boileau
- Born: December 2, 1933; Montreal, Quebec, Canada
- Died: February 2, 2025 (aged 91); Meriden, Connecticut, U.S.
- Height: 5 ft 9 in (175 cm)
- Weight: 170 lb (77 kg; 12 st 2 lb)
- Position: Center
- Shot: Left
- Played for: New Haven Blades; Long Island Ducks
- Playing career: 1951–1969

Claude Boileau (December 2, 1933 – February 2, 2025) was a Canadian professional hockey player who played 656 games in the Eastern Hockey League with the New Haven Blades and Long Island Ducks. He died on February 2, 2025, at the age of 91.
