= Régent Lacoursière =

Canadian swimmer (1935–2025)

- Born: 19 April 1935; Montreal, Quebec, Canada
- Died: 9 May 2025 (aged 90)
- Occupation: Swimmer

Régent Lacoursière (19 April 1935 – 9 May 2025) was a Canadian swimmer.

A winner of over 300 amateur swimming medals, he represented Canada at the 1954 British Empire and Commonwealth Games in Vancouver. Nicknamed the "Québécois Johnny Weissmuller", he won the Traversée internationale du lac Saint-Jean in 1960 and was inducted into the Quebec Sports Hall of Fame on 24 November 2010.

Lacoursière died on 9 May 2025, at the age of 90.
