= 2025 in Germany =

- Decades: 2000s; 2010s; 2020s; 2030s
- See also: Other events of 2025; History of Germany • Timeline • Years

The following is a list of events from the year 2025 in Germany.

== Incumbents ==
- President – Frank-Walter Steinmeier
- President of the Bundestag – Bärbel Bas (until 25 March); Julia Klöckner (since 25 March)
- Chancellor – Olaf Scholz (until 6 May); Friedrich Merz (since 6 May)
- President of the German Bundesrat – Anke Rehlinger (Note: The President of the Bundesrat, the speaker of the Bundesrat, a federal legislative chamber, in which the governments of the sixteen German states are represented. The president of the Bundesrat is ex officio also deputy to the President of Germany (Basic Law, Article 57), thus becomes first in the order, while acting on behalf of the President or while acting as head of state during a vacancy of the presidency.)
- President of the Federal Constitutional Court – Stephan Harbarth

== Events ==
=== January ===
- January 7 – Two people are killed in a shooting inside a company office in Bad Friedrichshall.
- January 9 – Elon Musk does a live broadcast with Alice Weidel from the AfD on X Spaces, during which Musk doubles down on his endorsement of the AfD.
- January 10 – The first case of foot-and-mouth disease in Germany since 1988 is discovered in a herd of water buffalo in Hönow, Brandenburg.
- January 11 – A bus overturns near Prenzlau, killing two people.
- January 12 – The Alternative for Germany (AfD) leadership votes to formally replace the Young Alternative for Germany (JA) as its youth organisation.
- January 15 – The Karlsruhe branch of the AfD initiates a campaign by distributing flyers resembling flight tickets labeled Abschiebetickets (deportation tickets) in mailboxes, prompting a police investigation.
- January 20 – Six people are injured after coming into contact with pepper spray at a concert by JPEGMafia in Berlin.
- January 22 – 2025 Aschaffenburg stabbing attack: Two people, including a child, are killed in a knife attack in Aschaffenburg. A suspect is arrested.
- January 29 – A non-binding resolution calling for tighter immigration policies passes in the Bundestag with support of opposition parties including the CDU and the AfD. The next day, Angela Merkel criticises CDU leader Friedrich Merz for introducing the resolution.
- January 31 – A bill filed by the CDU/CSU restricting immigration to Germany is voted down in the Bundestag.

=== February ===
- February 12 – The government extends controls on Germany's borders until 15 September.
- February 13 – 2025 Munich car attack: Two people are killed while at least 37 others are injured after a car rams through a street demonstration in Munich. The suspect, an Afghan with a valid residence and work permit, is arrested.
- February 20 –
  - The Federal Court of Justice rejects a petition by Birkenstock to recognise its footwear products as copyright-protected artwork.
  - A Russian national is arrested at Berlin Brandenburg Airport on suspicion of plotting to attack the Israeli embassy in Berlin on behalf of Islamic State.
- February 21 – One person is injured in a knife attack near the Memorial to the Murdered Jews of Europe in Berlin.
- February 23
  - 2025 German federal election: The CDU/CSU wins a plurality in the Bundestag with about 28.6% of the vote, followed by the AfD with 20.8% and the SPD with 16.4%.
  - The AfD becomes the strongest party in the East, securing all five former East German states.
  - Christian Lindner resigns as leader of the FDP and announces his retirement from active politics after the party fails to win a seat in the Bundestag following the federal election.
- February 25 – Maximilian Krah and Matthias Helferich are readmitted back into the AfD parliamentary group after a party meeting.
- February 26 – Four people are injured in a shooting near a courthouse in Bielefeld.
- February 27
  - A court in Jena sentences two Afghan residents to up to five years imprisonment for plotting to attack the Swedish Riksdag and assassinate lawmakers in response to the burning of copies of the Koran.
  - A two-day strike is launched at Munich Airport, resulting in disruptions to 80% of flights.

=== March ===
- March 2 – 2025 Hamburg state election.
- March 3 – 2025 Mannheim car attack: Two people are killed and ten others injured when a car crashes into a crowd in Mannheim.
- March 10 – A strike is held in 13 airports nationwide, causing a total of 3,500 flight cancellations affecting 560,000 passengers.
- March 11
  - The Sahra Wagenknecht Alliance (BSW) officially files a complaint with the Federal Constitutional Court seeking to legally challenge the results of the federal election.
  - A truck carrying heating oil collides with a tram at a crossing in Ubstadt-Weiher, causing both vehicles to catch fire and leaving three people dead.
- March 18 – The Bundestag votes 512-206 in favor of the proposed Debt brake agreement amendment, sending it to the Bundesrat, where it would have to pass by two-thirds in order to become law. The measure passes with the support of the SPD, CDU/CSU, Alliance 90/The Greens and the SSW also supported the reform, while the FDP, AfD, The Left and the BSW vote against.
- March 21 – The Bundesrat votes in favor of the debt brake agreement amendment 53-16, passing the two-thirds threshold to become law. The states of Brandenburg, Saxony-Anhalt, Thuringia, and Rhineland-Palatinate all abstain from voting, which is counted as voting in opposition. The Free Voters of Bavaria, which initially voiced objections to the amendment, ultimately votes in favor as a bloc.
- March 25 – The CDU's Julia Klöckner is elected as president of the Bundestag.
- March 26 – Police conduct nationwide raids on locations associated with the Eritrean anti-government group Brigade Nhamedu.

=== April ===
- April 1 – Rabea Rogge becomes the first female German astronaut in space with human spaceflight mission Fram2.
- April 4 – The German Bishops' Conference publishes a manual for blessing ceremonies for same-sex unions.
- April 6 – A family of three is killed in a shooting in Weitefeld. Rhineland-Palatinate Police launch a state-wide manhunt for the armed suspect.
- April 9
  - The CDU announces a coalition agreement with the SPD at the federal level.
  - The AfD finishes as the leading party for the first time in opinion polling.
- April 19 – Two people are killed in a shooting in Bad Nauheim. A suspect is arrested after five days.

=== May ===
- May 2 – The Federal Office for the Protection of the Constitution designates the AfD as a right-wing extremist organisation.
- May 5 – The AfD sues the Federal Office for the Protection of Constitution, accusing it of violating the German constitution by trying to prosecute the party for saying ideas which are considered freedom of speech and legitimate criticism of German immigration policies.
- May 7 – Friedrich Merz is elected as Chancellor by the Bundestag following two rounds of voting.
- May 8 – The Federal Office for the Protection of the Constitution suspends its designation of the AfD as a right-wing extremist organisation.
- May 13 – Peter Fitzek, a leader of the Reichsbürger movement and self-proclaimed "king" of Germany, is arrested on charges of plotting to overthrow the state.
- May 17 – Germany's Abor & Tynna finish at 15th place at Eurovision 2025 in Switzerland with the single "Baller".
- May 18 – Five people are injured in a knife attack in Bielefeld.
- May 21 – Five teenagers are arrested nationwide on suspicion of plotting attacks on migrants and political opponents on behalf of the far-right group Last Defense Wave.
- May 22 – A Yemeni national is arrested in Dachau on suspicion of membership in the Houthi movement.
- May 23 – Eighteen people are injured in a knife attack at the Hamburg Hauptbahnhof. A female suspect is arrested.
- May 24 – 2025 DFB-Pokal final: VfB Stuttgart win the 2024–25 DFB-Pokal after defeating Arminia Bielefeld 4–2.
- May 26 – A court in Braunschweig convicts four Volkswagen executives of fraud over the Volkswagen emissions scandal and sentences them to up to 4.5 years' imprisonment.
- May 27 – A Syrian national is arrested in Pirmasens on suspicion of involvement in human rights abuses at a prison in Damascus during the Arab Spring in Syria.
- May 31 –
  - A light aircraft crashes into a residential building in Korschenbroich, killing two people.
  - An Iranian resident is shot dead after opening fire at Federal Police officers during a traffic stop between Schirnding and Münchenreuth.

=== June ===
- 1 June – Three people are killed in a fire at a hospital in Hamburg.
- 2 June –
  - Former foreign minister Annalena Baerbock is elected as president of the United Nations General Assembly.
  - The Berlin Administrative Court rules against the German government's practice of rejecting asylum-seekers at border controls unless carried out under the Dublin Regulation.
- 4 June –
  - In the largest evacuation in Cologne since 1945, more than 20,000 residents are ordered evacuated as part of efforts to defuse three unexploded bombs dropped during World War II.
  - A Ryanair aircraft flying from Berlin to Milan makes an emergency landing at Memmingen Airport after encountering turbulence that injures nine people on board.
- 8 June – A spectator dies at the Allianz Arena in Munich while attending the 2025 UEFA Nations League Finals between Portugal and Spain.
- 16 June – An Oberlandesgericht in Frankfurt convicts Syrian resident Alaa Mousa for crimes against humanity committed on behalf of the Assad regime during the Syrian Civil War.
- 18–29 June – EuroBasket Women 2025 in Czech Republic, Germany, Greece and Italy.
- 24 June –
  - The Federal Administrative Court strikes down a ban imposed in July 2024 by the federal government on the far-right magazine Compact and its publisher, Compact-Magazin GmbH, saying that the publication did not meet conditions that justified the prohibition.
  - Finance minister Lars Klingbeil announces that the government will raise its defense budget from 2.4% to 3.9% of its GDP by 2029, citing a NATO quota for member states to raise defense spending due to the Russian invasion of Ukraine.
- 27 June – The Bundestag votes 444-135 to suspend family reunions for migrants with "subsidiary protection" until 2027.

=== July ===
- 1 July –
  - One person is killed while two others are injured in a knife attack inside the offices of a local electricity supplier in Mellrichstadt. A suspect is arrested.
  - Two firefighters are injured in a wildfire in Gohrischheide und Elbniederterrasse Zeithain, on the border of Saxony and Brandenburg.
- 3 July – Four people are injured in an axe attack inside an Intercity Express train traveling between Straubing and Plattling on its way to Vienna. A suspect is arrested.
- 4 July – A bus traveling from Copenhagen to Vienna overturns near Röbel, injuring 23 of the 55 people on board.
- 6 July – Poland imposes temporary border controls on crossings with Germany in Lithuania as part of efforts to curb the flow irregular asylum-seekers.
- 12 July – Four royal residences belonging to King Ludwig II of Bavaria (Neuschwanstein, Linderhof, Schachen and Herrenchiemsee) are designated as World Heritage Sites by UNESCO.
- 15 July – The Federal Constitutional Court dismisses a case brought about by Yemeni plaintiffs accusing the German government of failing to prevent deaths from US drone strikes on Yemen coordinated from Ramstein Air Base, citing the lack of a "sufficient connection" to the German state’s authority and "a serious danger of systematic violation" of international law.
- 18 July –
  - Khaled Mohamed Ali El Hishri aka Al-Buti, a Libyan national and former prison official wanted by the International Criminal Court for war crimes and crimes against humanity committed on inmates in 2015, is arrested in Germany.
  - Germany launches its second repatriation flight to Afghanistan since the Taliban retook power in 2021, deporting 81 Afghan nationals.
  - Nineteen people are injured by the errant detonation of fireworks at a fair in Düsseldorf.
- 23 July – A court in Berlin acquits satirist El Hotzo on charges of hate crimes and disturbing public peace over his social media posts relating to the attempted assassination of Donald Trump in Pennsylvania in 2024.
- 27 July – A passenger train traveling from Sigmaringen to Ulm derails near Riedlingen, killing three people and injuring 50 others.
- 29 July –
  - A court in Ingolstadt convicts three people for stealing 483 Celtic coins from a museum in Manching in 2022 and sentences them to up to 11 years' imprisonment.
  - A helicopter of the German Air Force crashes near Leipzig, killing two crew members and leaving a third missing.

=== August ===
- 8 August – Germany imposes a limited arms embargo to Israel in response to the latter's conduct in the Gaza War.
- 14 August – The government dismisses Richard Lutz as CEO of Deutsche Bahn amid criticism over poor service.
- 24 August – An American citizen is injured in a knife attack at a tram in Dresden.
- 26 August – An acquaintance of the main suspect in the 2024 Vienna terrorism plot in Austria is convicted by a court in Berlin for plotting and supporting a terrorist attack overseas and sentenced to a suspended 18-month prison term.
- 27 August –
  - Rheinmetall, the country's largest arms manufacturer, inaugurates a new munitions factory in Unterlüß, Lower Saxony, to produce 155 mm caliber artillery shells.
  - The section 16 of Bundesautobahn 100 in Berlin-Neukölln is finished and opened.

=== September ===
- 4 September – The Italian MediaForEurope group acquires the German private broadcaster ProSieben.
- 5 September – A schoolteacher is injured in a stabbing attack in Essen. The 17-year-old suspect is shot by police before being taken into custody.
- 10 September – The state court of Düsseldorf convicts Syrian national Issa Al H. of carrying out the 2024 Solingen stabbings and sentences him to life imprisonment.
- 11 September – The Bundestag votes in favor of lifting the parliamentary immunity of AfD deputy Maximilian Krah amid investigations into his alleged involvement with China, corruption and espionage.
- 13 September – Customs officers arrest two men and seize 400 kg (880 lb) of cocaine at the Port of Hamburg.
- 14 September –
  - 2025 North Rhine-Westphalia local elections: The CDU wins 33.3% of the vote, followed by the SPD at 22.1% and the AfD at 14.5%.
  - Germany wins EuroBasket 2025 after defeating Turkey 88-83 at the final in Latvia.
  - the far-right Third Way party wins a seat in the North Rhein-Westphalia local elections in the municipality of Hilchenbach.
- 16 September – An Afghan national is convicted and sentenced to life imprisonment for carrying out the 2024 Mannheim stabbing.
- 20 September – A cyberattack is carried out on Berlin Brandenburg Airport, causing major operational disruptions.
- 25 September – Multiple unidentified drones are discovered flying over critical infrastructure in Kiel and a military base in Sanitz.
- 29 September – Staff at the Afghan consulate-general in Bonn resign en masse in protest over the German government's decision to accredit Taliban representatives as diplomats.
- 30 September – Chinese intelligence activity abroad, China–Germany relations: A Chinese–German man is convicted of espionage in Dresden while working for AfD politician Maximilian Krah and sentenced to five years in prison. An accomplice is also given a suspended one and a half years sentence for supply cargo and passenger information from Leipzig Airport.

=== October ===
- 1 October
  - The annual Oktoberfest in Munich is shut down until 17:30 due to a bomb explosion at a nearby house which kills two people, including the perpetrator.
  - Three men are arrested in Berlin for preparing a terrorist attack allegedly on behalf of Hamas against Jewish institutions. Hamas denies involvement.
- 2 October – Unidentified drones are seen flying over Munich Airport, resulting in major disruptions to aviation. A second wave of drones leads to the airport's closure the next day.
- 7 October – The mayor-elect of Herdecke Iris Stalzer is critically injured in a stabbing attack.
- 8 October – The Bundestag repeals a law that allowed highly qualified foreigners apply for citizenship after three years of residence instead of the standard five.
- 28 October – The government culls 500,000 birds, including chickens, geese, and turkeys, as the Friedrich Loeffler Institute reports over 100 outbreaks of H5N1 avian influenza, including 30 outbreaks among poultry battery farms across the country.

=== November ===
- 5 November – A court in Aachen sentences a palliative care nurse to life imprisonment for the murder of 10 patients and attempted murder of 27 others using sedative injections at a hospital in Würselen from 2023 to 2024.
- 10 November – A dual German-Polish national is arrested in Dortmund on suspicion of inciting attacks on German politicians and fundraising rewards through cryptocurrency donations.
- 17 November – Germany qualifies for the 2026 FIFA World Cup after defeating Slovakia 6-0 at the 2026 FIFA World Cup qualification in Leipzig.
- 24 November – A parking inspector and his wife are arrested on suspicion of embezzling more than €1 million from parking meters in Kempten.
- 27 November – A Ukrainian suspect in the 2022 Nord Stream pipelines sabotage is extradited from Italy to Germany.

=== December ===
- 2 December –
  - Unidentified thieves steal at least 10,000 rounds of live ammunition from a delivery truck headed to a Bundeswehr barracks in Burg bei Magdeburg, Saxony-Anhalt.
  - Germany finishes second at the 2025 UEFA Women's Nations League after losing to Spain 3-0 at the final in Madrid.
- 3 December – UEFA awards Germany the hosting rights for the UEFA Women's Euro 2029 championship.
- 12 December —
  - The government summons the Russian ambassador following formal accusations of Russian involvement in disinformation, sabotage, cyberattacks and election interference against Germany in 2024.
  - Five foreign nationals from Morocco, Egypt and Syria are arrested on suspicion of plotting to attack a Christmas market in Bavaria.
- 22 December – A man drives a car into two other vehicles and a bus stop before being apprehended in Giessen, injuring three people.
- 23 December – The United States imposes sanctions on HateAid leaders Josephine Ballon and Anna-Lena von Hodenberg on charges of promoting online censorship against American interests.
- 29 December – Thieves rob a bank vault in Gelsenkirchen, stealing about €30 million from safe deposit boxes.

== Holidays ==
- 1 January – New Year's Day
- 6 January – Epiphany
- 8 March – International Women's Day
- 17 April – Maundy Thursday
- 18 April – Good Friday
- 20 April – Easter Sunday
- 21 April – Easter Monday
- 1 May – International Workers' Day
- 9 May – Ascension Day
- 9 June – Whit Sunday
- 10 June – Whit Monday
- 19 June – Corpus Christi
- 15 August – Assumption Day
- 20 September – Children's Day
- 3 October – German Unity Day
- 31 October – Reformation Day
- 1 November – All Saints' Day
- 19 November – Repentance Day
- 25 December – Christmas Day
- 26 December – Saint Stephen's Day

== Art and entertainment ==
- List of German films of 2025
- List of 2025 box office number-one films in Germany
- List of German submissions for the Academy Award for Best International Feature Film

== Deaths ==
=== January ===
- 8 January – Rudolf Dreßler, 84, politician (SPD) (b. 1940)
- 14 January
  - Hans Reichelt, 99, politician (b. 1925)
  - Irmgard Furchner, 99, war criminal (b. 1925)
- 15 January – Stephanie Aeffner, 48, politician (Alliance 90/The Greens), member of the Bundestag (since 2021) (b. 1976)
- 16 January – Wolfgang Wesemann, 75, cyclist (b. 1949)
- 17 January – Christine Wischer, 80, politician (SPD) (b. 1944)
- 28 January – Horst Janson, 89, actor (b. 1935)
- 29 January – Klaus Willbrand, 83, antiquarian bookseller and literary critic (b. 1941)

=== February ===
- 1 February
  - Horst Köhler, 81, President of Germany (2004–2010), president of the European Bank for Reconstruction and Development (1998–2000) and managing director of the International Monetary Fund (2000–2004) (b. 1943)
  - Friedrich Kronenberg, 91, politician (CDU), member of the Bundestag (1983–1990) (b. 1933)
  - Manfred Meinsen, 86, politician (The Greens) (b. 1938)
  - Sigi Renz, 86, racing cyclist (b. 1938)
- 2 February
  - Peter Enders, 62, chess player (b. 1963)
  - Gerd Wirth, 73, politician (SPD) (b. 1951)
- 3 February
  - Erwin Rüddel, 69, politician (CDU), member of the Bundestag (since 2009) (b. 1955)
  - Jürgen Schmude, 88, politician (SPD), federal minister of the interior (1982), member of the Bundestag (1969–1990) (b. 1936)
- 5 February
  - Thea Bock, 86, politician (SPD), member of the Bundestag (1991–1994) (b. 1938)
  - Ernst-Joachim Küppers, 82, swimmer (b. 1942)
  - Hans-Peter Lehmann, 90, opera and artistic director, and intendant (b. 1934)
- 7 February
  - Akbar Behkalam, 80, Iranian-German painter and sculptor (b. 1944)
  - Robert Maus, 91, politician (CDU) (b. 1933)
- 9 February – Elena Grölz, 64, handball player (b. 1960)
- 10 February
  - Otto Mayr, 94, mechanical engineer and technology historian (b. 1930)
  - Horst Weidenmüller, 60, music executive producer and entrepreneur (b. 1964)
- 11 February – Sigrid Metz-Göckel, 84, sociologist and political scientist (b. 1940)
- 12 February – Gisela Bleibtreu-Ehrenberg, 95, sociologist, ethnologist and sexologist (b. 1929)
- 15 February – Gerhart Baum, 92, lawyer and politician (FDP), federal minister of the interior (1978–1982), member of the Bundestag (1972–1994) (b. 1932)
- 16 February – Walter Althammer, 96, politician (CSU) (b. 1928)
- 18 February – Claus Roxin, 93, jurist, scholar of criminal law (b. 1931)
- 20 February
  - Erhard Hofeditz, 71, footballer (KSV Baunatal, TSV 1860 Munich, 1. FC Kaiserslautern) (b. 1953)
  - Friedrich-Wilhelm Junge, 86, actor (SAS 181 Does Not Reply, Love's Confusion) (b. 1938)
- 21 February – Herbert Mertin, 66, jurist and politician (FDP) (b. 1958)
- 25 February – Wolfgang Hamberger, 94, politician and author, mayor of Fulda (1970–1998) (b. 1930)
- 26 February – Monika Lundi, 82, film and television actress (Crazy – Completely Mad) (b. 1942)

=== March ===
- 1 March – Tim Kruger, 44, film actor, producer, and director (b. 1981)
- March – Klaus Richtzenhain, 90, East German middle-distance runner (b. 1934)
- 2 March – Bernhard Vogel, 92, politician, Minister President of Rhineland-Palatinate (1976–1988) and Minister President of Thuringia (1992–2003) (b. 1932)
- 4 March – Antje-Katrin Kühnemann, 80, television presenter and physician (b. 1945)
- 9 March – Hans-Peter Korff, 82, actor (b. 1942)
- 15 March - Doris Fitschen, 56, footballer (b. 1968)
- 16 March – AnNa R., 55, singer and main vocalist of Rosenstolz (b. 1969)
- 22 March – Rolf Schimpf, 100, actor (b. 1924)
- 29 March – Gerd Poppe, 84, politician and dissident (b. 1941)

=== April ===
- 3 April – Andreas Prinz von Sachsen-Coburg und Gotha, 82, head of the former ducal House of Saxe-Coburg and Gotha (since 1998) (b. 1943)
- 5 April – Georg Gölter, 86, politician (b. 1938)
- 8 April – Manfred Schüler, 93, economist and politician (b. 1932)
- 14 April – Peter Seiffert, 71, opera singer (b. 1954)
- 15 April – Werner Thissen, 86, Roman-Catholic bishop (b. 1938)
- 21 April – Walter Frankenstein, 100, engineer and Holocaust survivor (b. 1924)
- 23 April – Angela Tillmann, 68, politician (b. 1957)
- 29 April – Christfried Schmidt, 92, composer and arranger (b. 1932)

=== May ===
- 7 May – Günther Nonnenmacher, 76, journalist and publisher (b. 1948)
- 9 May
  - Margot Friedländer, 103, Holocaust survivor and public speaker (b. 1921)
  - Nadja Abd el Farrag, 60, television personality and singer (b. 1965)

=== June ===
- 4 June – Karlmann Geiß, 90, jurist and judge (b. 1935)
- 7 June – Julia Dingwort-Nusseck, 103, journalist (b. 1921)
- 8 June – Carlo von Tiedemann, 82, journalist and television presenter (b. 1943)
- 10 June – Günther Uecker, 95, painter and sculptor (b. 1930)
- 28/29 June – Wolfgang Böhmer, 89, politician (CDU) (b. 1936)
- 30 June – Michael Sommer, 73, trade unionist leader (b. 1952)

=== July ===
- 3 July – Anita Kupsch, 85, actress (b. 1940)
- 16 July – Claus Peymann, 88, theatre director and manager (b. 1937)
- 17 July – Udo Voigt, 73, politician, leader of the (NDP) (1996-2011), (b. 1952)
- 25 July – Doris Gercke, 87, writer, (b. 1937)
- 27 July – Horst Mahler, 89, Red Army Faction militant and convicted Holocaust denier (b. 1936)
- 28 July – Laura Dahlmeier, 31, biathlete, double Olympic champion (2018) (b. 1993)

=== August ===
- 3 August – Ulrich Potofski, 63, sport journalist (b. 1952)
- 7 August – Heinz Hardt, 89, politician (b. 1936)
- 18 August – Josef Stock, 87, politician (b. 1933)
- 19 August – Herwig Schopper, 101, experimental physicist (b. 1924)
- 21 August – Hans Feldmeier, 101, pharmacist. (b. 1924)
- 22 August –
  - Rolf Seelmann-Eggebert, 88, journalist (b. 1937)
  - Johannes Helm, 98, psychologist, painter and writer. (b. 1927)
- 30 August – Arthur Brauss, 89, actor (b. 1936)

=== September ===
- 3 September – Johannes Friedrich, 77, Protestant bishop in Bavaria (b. 1948)
- 5 September – Horst Krause, 73, actor (b. 1941)
- 5 September – Ruth Weiss, 101, writer (b. 1924)
- 6 September – Christoph von Dohnányi, 95, conductor (b. 1929)
- 8 September – Inge Brück, 89, singer and actress (b. 1936)
- 11 September – Manfred Kock, 83, president of the Evangelical Church in the Rhineland (b. 1936)
- 12 September – Ulf Fink, 83, politician (CDU) (b. 1942)
- 13 September – Harald Hartung, 93, philologist and writer (b. 1932)
- 28 September – Wolfgang Helfrich, 92, physicist and inventor (b. 1932)

=== October ===
- 6 October – Wanda Perdelwitz, 41, actress (b. 1984)
- 7 October – Franz Josef Wagner, 82, journalist (b. 1943)
- 8 October – Wolfgang Fiedler, 74, politician (b. 1951)
- 9 October – Udo Schiefner, 66, politician (b. 1959)
- 16 October – Jack White, 85, composer and music producer (b. 1940)
- 16 October – Klaus Doldinger, 89, composer and saxophonist
- 17/18 October – Petra Kammerevert, 59, politician (b. 1966)
- 18 October – Olga Sippl, 105, politician (b. 1920)

=== November ===
- 5 November – Lothar Klein, 69, member of the Volkskammer (1990).
- 6 November –
  - Manfred Goldberg, 95, German-born British educator and Holocaust survivor.
  - Willi Gundlach, 96, musicologist
  - Ulrich Claesges, 88, philosopher and professor (University of Cologne).
- 7 November – Gisela Bock, 83, historian
- 12 November – Gertrude Degenhardt, 85, illustrator and printmaker
- 14 November – Hark Bohm, 86, actor, screenwriter and film director
- 16 November – Hans Friderichs, 89, politician
- 17 November – Kessler Twins, 89, dancers, singers and actresses
- 20 November –
  - Helme Heine, 84, children's book author, writer and illustrator
  - Dieter Herzog, 79, football player
  - Willi Halder, 67, politician, (b. 1958)
- 21 November – Siegfried Grossmann, 95, theoretical physicist
- 22 November – Paul Tremmel, 96, poet.
- 23 November – Udo Kier, 81, actor
- 24 November – Heribert Offermanns, 88, chemist
- 25 November – Ingrid van Bergen, 94, actress
- 27 November – Lorenz Weinrich, 96, historian

=== December ===
- 1 December – Klaus von Trotha, 87, politician (b. 1938)
- 5 December – Gerhard Scheu, 82, politician (b. 1943)
- 12 December – Rolf Becker, 90, actor (b. 1935)
- 15 December – Thomas Johannes Mayer, 56, opera singer.
- 17 December – Rosa von Praunheim, 83, film director and LGBT activist (b. 1942)
- 19 December – Fritz Paul, 83, philologist (b. 1942)
- 21 December – Sebastian Hertner, 34, footballer (Erzgebirge Aue, VfB Stuttgart II, Schalke 04 II)
- 22 December – Uwe Kockisch, 81, actor (b. 1944)

== See also ==
- 2025 in the European Union
- 2025 in Europe
