= Seelmann =

Seelmann is a surname. Notable people with the surname include:

- Georg Seelmann (1917–1989), German Luftwaffe ace
- Rolf Seelmann-Eggebert (1937–2025), German journalist
- Walter Seelmann-Eggebert (1915–1988), German radiochemist

== See also ==
- Seelman
- Sehlman
- Sehlmann
