= Tremmel =

Tremmel is a surname. Notable people with the surname include:

- Anton Tremmel (born 1994), German alpine skier
- Gerhard Tremmel (born 1978), German football player and scout
- Mark Tremmel (born 1971), American politician
- Paul Tremmel (1929–2025), German poet

== See also ==
- Remmel
