= Wisher =

Wisher or Wischer is a surname. Notable people with the surname include:

- Christine Wischer (1944–2025), German politician
- Klara Wischer (born 1991), Australian basketball player
- Michael Wisher (1935–1995), British actor
- William Wisher Jr. (born 1958), American screenwriter
- Yolanda Wisher (born 1976), American poet
