= Karlmann Geiß =

German judge (1935–2025)

President of the Federal Court of Justice
- In office 1 August 1996 – 31 May 2000
- Preceded by: Walter Odersky
- Succeeded by: Günter Hirsch

Personal details
- Born: 31 May 1935 Ellwangen, Gau Württemberg-Hohenzollern, Germany
- Died: 4 June 2025 (aged 90)
- Education: LMU Munich; University of Tübingen
- Occupation: Judge

Karlmann Geiß (31 May 1935 – 4 June 2025) was a German jurist and judge. He served as president of the Federal Court of Justice from 1996 to 2000.

Geiß died on 4 June 2025, at the age of 90.
