= Constitutional Court of Saxony =

German state constitutional court

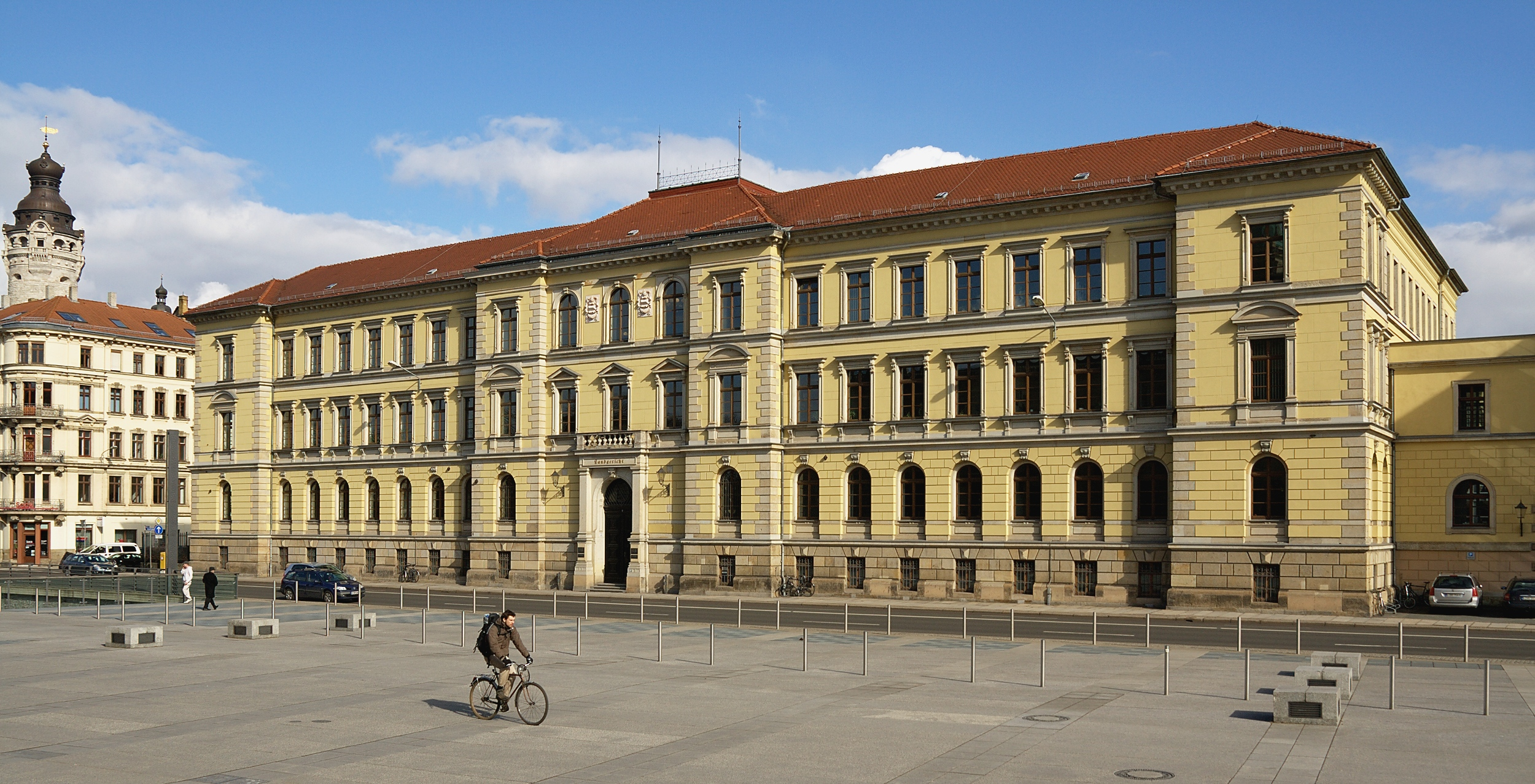
- Constitutional Court of Saxony building, view from the Simsonplatz
- Interactive map of Constitutional Court of Saxony
- 51°20′0.8″N 12°22′17.4″E
- Established: 18 February 1993
- Location: Harkortstraße 9, Leipzig
- Coordinates: 51°20′0.8″N 12°22′17.4″E
- Website: verfassungsgerichtshof.sachsen.de

President
- Currently: Matthias Grünberg

Vice President
- Currently: Uwe Berlit

The Constitutional Court of Saxony (German: Verfassungsgerichtshof des Freistaates Sachsen; abbreviated: SächsVerfGHG) is the constitutional court of Saxony. The court has its seat in Leipzig and is opposite of the Federal Administrative Court building.

== History ==
The constitutional court was formed on 18 February 1993, when the Landtag of Saxony determined the seat of the court in Leipzig.

== Former presidents of the court ==
- Günter Hirsch (1993–1995)
- Thomas Pfeiffer (1995–2005)
- Klaus Budewig (2005-2007)
- Birgit Munz (2007-2020)
- Matthias Grünberg (since 2020)
