= Saale-Holzland-Kreis I =

Electoral constituency in Thuringia, Germany

Saale-Holzland-Kreis I is an electoral constituency (German: Wahlkreis) represented in the Landtag of Thuringia. It elects one member via first-past-the-post voting. Under the current constituency numbering system, it is designated as constituency 35. It covers the southern part of Saale-Holzland-Kreis.

Saale-Holzland-Kreis I was created for the 1994 state election. Since 2019, it has been represented by Stephan Tiesler of the Christian Democratic Union (CDU).

== Geography ==
As of the 2019 state election, Saale-Holzland-Kreis I covers the southern part of Saale-Holzland-Kreis, specifically the municipalities of Altenberga, Bibra, Bremsnitz, Bucha, Eichenberg, Eineborn, Freienorla, Geisenhain, Gneus, Großbockedra, Großeutersdorf, Großpürschütz, Gumperda, Hermsdorf, Hummelshain, Kahla, Karlsdorf, Kleinbockedra, Kleinebersdorf, Kleineutersdorf, Laasdorf, Lindig, Lippersdorf-Erdmannsdorf, Meusebach, Milda, Möckern, Mörsdorf, Oberbodnitz, Orlamünde, Ottendorf, Rattelsdorf, Rausdorf, Reichenbach, Reinstädt, Renthendorf, Rothenstein, Ruttersdorf-Lotschen, Schleifreisen, Schöps, Seitenroda, St.Gangloff, Stadtroda, Sulza, Tautendorf, Tissa, Tröbnitz, Trockenborn-Wolfersdorf, Unterbodnitz, Waltersdorf, Weißbach, and Zöllnitz.

== Members ==
The constituency has been held by the Christian Democratic Union since its creation in 1994. Its first representative was Wolfgang Fiedler, who served from 1994 to 2019. Since 2019, it has been represented by Stephan Tiesler.

Election	Member	Party	%
1994	Wolfgang Fiedler	CDU	43.3
1999	Wolfgang Fiedler	CDU	50.6
2004	Wolfgang Fiedler	CDU	48.7
2009	Wolfgang Fiedler	CDU	41.4
2014	Wolfgang Fiedler	CDU	46.9
2019	Stephan Tiesler	CDU	26.1
2024	Stephan Tiesler	CDU	39.8

== Election results ==
=== 2024 election ===
State election (2024): Saale-Holzland-Kreis I
Notes:	Blue background denotes the winner of the electorate vote. Pink background denotes a candidate elected from their party list. Yellow background denotes an electorate win by a list member, or other incumbent. A ✓ or ✗ denotes status of any incumbent, win or lose respectively.						
Party	Candidate	Votes	%	±%	Party votes	%	±%
CDU	✓ Stephan Tiesler	9,890	39.8	▲13.7	6,357	25.2	▲2.9
AfD	Denny Jankowski	9,114	36.7	▲13.7	8,009	31.8	▲8.3
BSW					3,827	15.2	
Left	Markus Gleichmann	3,202	12.9	▼12.9	3,375	13.4	▼17.3
SPD	Hannah Opitz	1,563	6.3	▼1.5	1,386	5.5	▼1.4
FDP	Patrick Fresh	646	2.6	▼3.0	309	1.2	▼5.5
Greens	Rita von Eggeling	433	1.7	▼3.4	723	2.9	▼1.4
Values					282	1.1	
FW					254	1.0	
APT					248	1.0	Steady
Familie					149	0.6	
BD					119	0.5	
Pirates					74	0.3	Steady
ÖDP					44	0.2	▼0.3
MLPD					28	0.1	▼0.1
Informal votes		530			194		
Total valid votes		24,848			25,184		
Turnout		25,378	78.0	▲7.3			
CDU hold	Majority	776	3.1	▲2.8			

=== 2019 election ===
State election (2019): Saale-Holzland-Kreis I
Notes:	Blue background denotes the winner of the electorate vote. Pink background denotes a candidate elected from their party list. Yellow background denotes an electorate win by a list member, or other incumbent. A ✓ or ✗ denotes status of any incumbent, win or lose respectively.						
Party	Candidate	Votes	%	±%	Party votes	%	±%
CDU	Stephan Tiesler	6,016	26.1	▼20.8	5,163	22.3	▼13.6
Left	Markus Gleichmann	5,945	25.8	▼4.2	7,101	30.7	▲2.2
AfD	Dirk Luge	5,309	23.0		5,442	23.5	▲11.3
SPD	Irene Schlotter	1,792	7.8	▼1.2	1,598	6.9	▼2.1
Independent	Tobias Gruber	1,477	6.4				
FDP	Stefan Beyer	1,297	5.6	▲2.1	1,547	6.7	▲3.7
Greens	Olaf Möller	1,178	5.1	▼1.1	991	4.3	▼0.7
MLPD	Therese Gmelch	67	0.3		52	0.2	
List-only parties					1,244	5.4	
Informal votes		423			366		
Total valid votes		23,081			23,138		
Turnout		23,504	70.7	▲11.5			
CDU hold	Majority	71	0.3	▼16.6			

=== 2014 election ===
State election (2014): Saale-Holzland-Kreis I
Notes:	Blue background denotes the winner of the electorate vote. Pink background denotes a candidate elected from their party list. Yellow background denotes an electorate win by a list member, or other incumbent. A ✓ or ✗ denotes status of any incumbent, win or lose respectively.						
Party	Candidate	Votes	%	±%	Party votes	%	±%
CDU	✓ Wolfgang Fiedler	9,355	46.9	▲5.5	7,215	35.9	▲3.0
Left	Markus Gleichmann	5,996	30.0	▲3.4	5,737	28.5	▲0.7
AfD					2,448	12.2	
SPD	Michael Gauer	1,800	9.0	▼4.2	1,821	9.0	▼8.0
Greens	Olaf Möller	1,238	6.2	▼0.7	1,015	5.0	▼0.4
NPD	Stefanie Löschner	874	4.4	▲0.4	604	3.0	▼0.9
FDP	Patrick Frisch	700	3.5	▼4.4	605	3.0	▼6.1
List-only parties					680	3.4	
Informal votes		417			255		
Total valid votes		19,963			20,125		
Turnout		20,380	59.2	▼1.8			
CDU hold	Majority	3,359	16.9	▲2.1			

=== 2009 election ===
State election (2009): Saale-Holzland-Kreis I
Notes:	Blue background denotes the winner of the electorate vote. Pink background denotes a candidate elected from their party list. Yellow background denotes an electorate win by a list member, or other incumbent. A ✓ or ✗ denotes status of any incumbent, win or lose respectively.						
Party	Candidate	Votes	%	±%	Party votes	%	±%
CDU	✓ Wolfgang Fiedler	8,941	41.4	▼7.3	7,131	32.9	▼12.3
Left	Mike Huster	5,744	26.6	▼0.1	6,020	27.8	▲3.5
SPD	Regine Kanis	2,839	13.2	▼0.8	3,683	17.0	▲2.4
FDP	Gerhard Jahns	1,709	7.9	▲1.9	1,967	9.1	▲4.7
Greens	Jennifer Schubert	1,488	6.9	▲2.3	1,169	5.4	▲1.5
NPD	Wolfgang Zacholl	867	4.0		836	3.9	▲2.5
List-only parties					848	3.9	
Informal votes		457			391		
Total valid votes		21,588			21,654		
Turnout		22,045	61.0	▲0.2			
CDU hold	Majority	3,197	14.8	▼7.2			

=== 2004 election ===
State election (2004): Saale-Holzland-Kreis I
Notes:	Blue background denotes the winner of the electorate vote. Pink background denotes a candidate elected from their party list. Yellow background denotes an electorate win by a list member, or other incumbent. A ✓ or ✗ denotes status of any incumbent, win or lose respectively.						
Party	Candidate	Votes	%	±%	Party votes	%	±%
CDU	✓ Wolfgang Fiedler	10,381	48.7	▼1.9	9,714	45.2	▼5.5
PDS	Mike Huster	2,677	26.7	▲9.1	5,220	24.3	▲5.2
SPD	Coryn Kopke	2,986	14.0	▼3.9	3,144	14.6	▼2.5
FDP	Norbert Ortloff	1,282	6.0	▲3.1	957	4.4	▲2.3
Greens	Katrin Schmidt	970	4.6	▲2.5	836	3.9	▲2.2
List-only parties					1,635	7.6	
Informal votes		1,104			894		
Total valid votes		21,296			21,506		
Turnout		22,400	60.8	▼3.1			
CDU hold	Majority	4,704	22.0	▼10.7			

=== 1999 election ===
State election (1999): Saale-Holzland-Kreis I
Notes:	Blue background denotes the winner of the electorate vote. Pink background denotes a candidate elected from their party list. Yellow background denotes an electorate win by a list member, or other incumbent. A ✓ or ✗ denotes status of any incumbent, win or lose respectively.						
Party	Candidate	Votes	%	±%	Party votes	%	±%
CDU	✓ Wolfgang Fiedler	11,590	50.6	▲7.3	11,675	50.7	▲6.5
SPD	Christina Roemer	4,095	17.9	▼8.6	3,947	17.1	▼10.9
PDS	Mike Huster	4,023	17.6	▲4.4	4,392	19.1	▲4.8
VIBT	Jörg Delinger	1,360	5.9		830	3.6	
REP	Ingo Leichsering	697	3.0	▲1.0	244	1.1	▼0.7
FDP	Uwe Müller	670	2.9	▼1.4	480	2.1	▼1.9
Greens	Angela Baum	486	2.1	▼5.6	388	1.7	▼3.3
List-only parties					1,065	4.6	
Informal votes		337			237		
Total valid votes		22,921			23,021		
Turnout		23,258	63.9	▼13.4			
CDU hold	Majority	7,495	32.7	▲15.9			

=== 1994 election ===
State election (1994): Holzlandkreis I
Notes:	Blue background denotes the winner of the electorate vote. Pink background denotes a candidate elected from their party list. Yellow background denotes an electorate win by a list member, or other incumbent. A ✓ or ✗ denotes status of any incumbent, win or lose respectively.						
Party	Candidate	Votes	%	±%	Party votes	%	±%
CDU	Wolfgang Fiedler	11,364	43.3		11,571	44.2	
SPD		6,947	26.5		7,340	28.0	
PDS		3,459	13.2		3,750	14.3	
Greens		2,009	7.7		1,329	5.1	
FDP		1,129	4.3		1,060	4.0	
New Forum		776	3.0		380	1.5	
REP		532	2.0		478	1.8	
List-only parties					279	1.1	
Informal votes		686			715		
Total valid votes		26,216			26,187		
Turnout		26,902	77.3				
CDU win new seat	Majority	4,417	16.8				
