= 2027 in Germany =

- Decades: 2000s; 2010s; 2020s; 2030s
- See also: Other events of 2027; History of Germany • Timeline • Years

Events in the year 2027 in Germany.

== Events ==
=== Predicted and scheduled ===
- 13–31 January – 2027 World Men's Handball Championship
- 30 January – 2027 German presidential election
- 18 April 2027 Saarland state election
- 18 April 2027 Schleswig-Holstein state election
- 25 April 2027 North Rhine-Westphalia state election
- 14–30 May– 2027 IIHF World Championship in Düsseldorf and Mannheim
- 26 May – 2027 UEFA Europa League final in Frankfurt am Main
- 30 May – 2027 Bremen state election
- 26 September – 2027 Lower Saxony state election

== Holidays ==
- 1 January – New Year's Day
- 6 January – Epiphany
- 8 March – International Women's Day
- 25 March – Maundy Thursday
- 26 March – Good Friday
- 28 March – Easter Sunday
- 29 March – Easter Monday
- 1 May – International Workers' Day
- 6 May – Ascension Day
- 16 May – Whit Sunday
- 17 May – Whit Monday
- 27 May – Corpus Christi
- 15 August – Assumption Day
- 20 September – Children's Day
- 3 October – German Unity Day
- 31 October – Reformation Day
- 1 November – All Saints' Day
- 17 November – Repentance Day
- 25 December – Christmas Day
- 26 December – Saint Stephen's Day

== Art and entertainment ==
- List of German submissions for the Academy Award for Best International Feature Film

== See also ==
- 2027 in the European Union
- 2027 in Europe
