= Gymnasium Allee =

School in Hamburg, Germany

Coordinates: 53.5550°N 9.9410°E

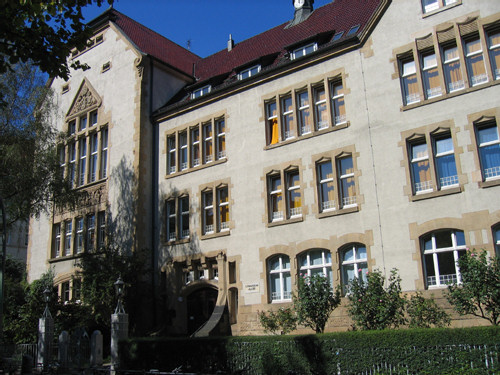
- Hamburg; Germany

Information
- Opened: 1876
- Principal: Ulf Nebe
- Faculty: 75
- Website: http://www.gymnasium-allee.hamburg.de/

Gymnasium Allee is a school in form of a German "Gymnasium" in Hamburg-Altona-Nord. Founded in 1876 as a school for higher girls education, it is being used for both boys and girls since 1972. During the school year 2012/2013 794 pupils were educated by 75 teachers. It was listed as a monument in 2007.

== Famous pupils ==
- Karin Hardt (1910–1992), Actress
- Dr. Hiltgunt Zassenhaus (1916–2004), „Der Engel von Fuhlsbüttel“, Doctor
- Dr. Julia Dingwort-Nusseck (1921-2025), President of LZB Niedersachsen i.R.
- Marianne Tidick (born 1942), Politician (SPD), Minister a.D.
- Britta Ernst (born 1961), Politician (SPD)
- Matthias Glasner (born 1965), Movie Director
- Ayşe Polat (born 1970), Movie Director and Author
- Aygül Özkan (born 1971), Politician (CDU), Ministerin a.D.
- Fatih Akın (born 1973), Movie Director, Author, Actor and Producer
- Adam Bousdoukos (born 1974), Actor
- Zlatan Bajramović (born 1979), Football Player
- Ivan Klasnić (born 1980), Football Player
