= Ulrich Claesges =

German philosopher (1937–2025)

Ulrich Claesges (13 March 1937 – 6 November 2025) was a German philosopher and academic.

== Life and career ==
Claesges was born in Krefeld on 13 March 1937. He studied sociology, German studies and philosophy at the University of Cologne from 1957, where he worked between 1961 and 1964, first as a student assistant and then as a research assistant.

From 1980, Claesges taught as a professor of philosophy at the University of Cologne and as a board member at the Department of Philosophy, specializing on the topics of Kant, German Idealism and Analytic Philosophy. His research focused on the phenomenology of Edmund Husserl. He was a member of the Center for Advanced Research in Phenomenology.

Claesges died on 6 November 2025, at the age of 88.
