= Manfred Meinsen =

German politician (1938–2025)

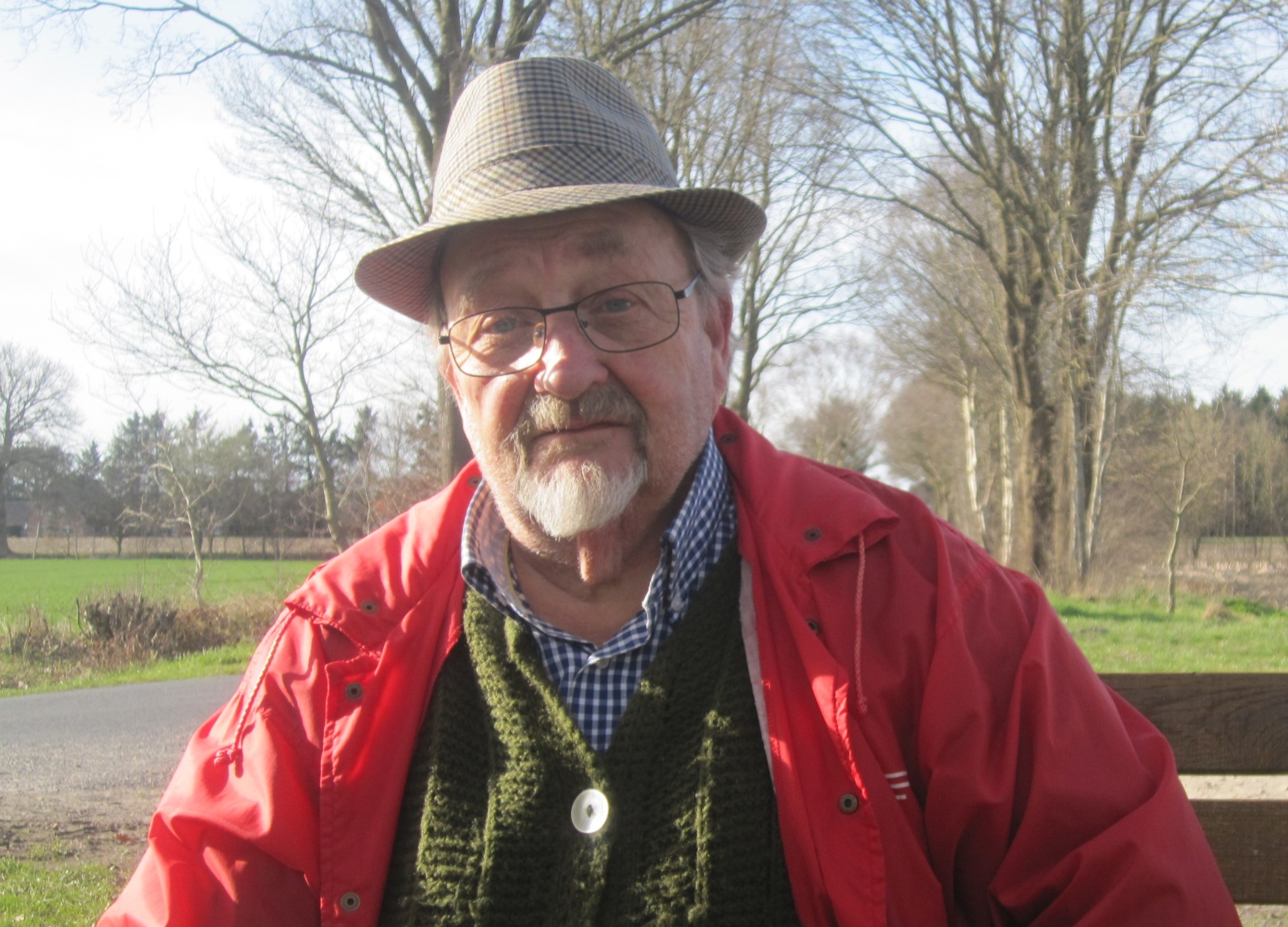
- Meinsen in 2018

Member of the Landtag of Lower Saxony
- In office 1982–1986

Personal details
- Born: 17 July 1938; Gronau, Gau Westphalia-North, Germany
- Died: 1 February 2025 (aged 86); Oldenburg, Lower Saxony, Germany
- Political party: The Greens
- Occupation: Civil engineer

Manfred Meinsen (17 July 1938 – 1 February 2025) was a German politician. A member of The Greens, he served in the Landtag of Lower Saxony from 1982 to 1986.

Meinsen died in Oldenburg on 1 February 2025, at the age of 86.
