= Johannes Helm =

German writer and painter (1927–2025)

Johannes Helm (10 March 1927 – 22 August 2025) was a German psychologist, painter and writer.

== Life and work ==
Helm was born 10 March 1927 in Schlawa, Lower Silesia, Prussia, Germany. In his book "Malgründe" it is described in the foreword that he had to become a soldier at the age of 17 and was a prisoner of war until the age of 20. He obtained his university entrance qualification at the Workers' and Peasants' Faculty.

He studied psychology at the Humboldt University of Berlin, where he received his diploma in 1953. In 1958 he received his doctorate from Humboldt University with the dissertation "On the Effect of Success Series on Thinking and Performance". From 1970 to 1986 he taught as a professor with a chair of clinical psychology and headed the department of clinical psychology.

Helm was instrumental in the development of an internationally oriented clinical psychology in the GDR. Together with Inge Frohburg, he further developed the concepts of conversational psychotherapy and made them ready for therapeutic application in the GDR and developed corresponding training and further education programs. In 1968, Helm formed his first working and research group at the Humboldt University of Berlin.

In addition to psychology, Helm initially pursued painting as a hobby, but later developed it into his main focus.

The phases of this development

In the 1980s, he ended his work as a professor prematurely and since then had devoted himself exclusively to painting.

Helm died 22 August 2025, at the age of 98.
