= Klaus von Trotha =

German politician (1938–2025)

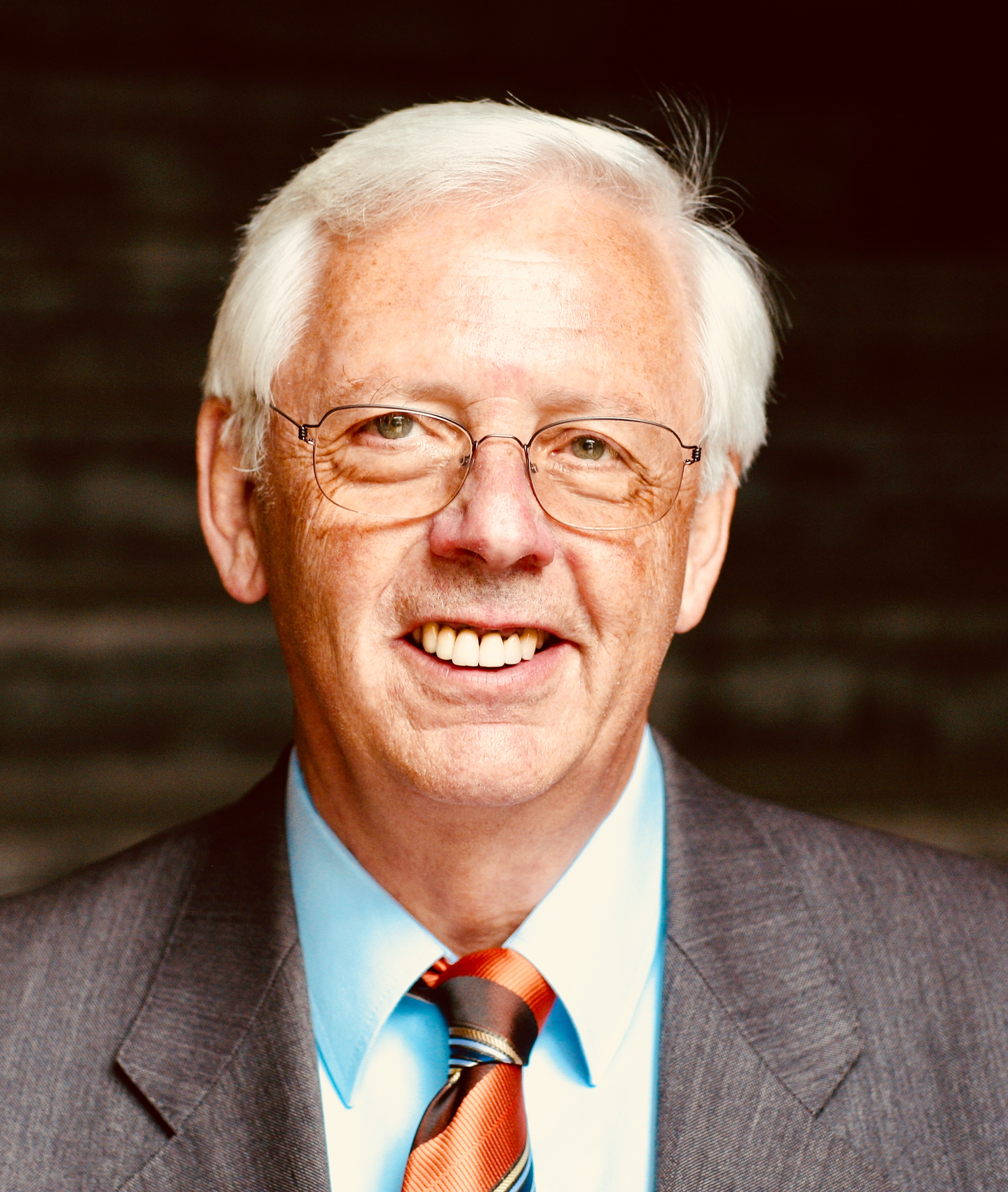
- von Trotha in 2015

Member of the Landtag of Baden-Württemberg
- In office 4 April 1976 – 25 March 2001

Minister of Science, Research and the Arts of Baden-Württemberg
- In office 1991–2001
- Preceded by: Helmut Engler
- Succeeded by: Peter Frankenberg

Personal details
- Born: Klaus-Dietrich von Trotha; 7 October 1938 Berlin, Germany
- Died: 29 November 2025 (aged 87) Baden-Baden, Germany
- Party: CDU
- Education: Free University of Berlin
- Occupation: Lawyer

Klaus-Dietrich von Trotha (7 October 1938 – 29 November 2025) was a German politician. A member of the Christian Democratic Union, he served in the Landtag of Baden-Württemberg from 1976 to 2001 and was the state's Minister of Science, Research and the Arts from 1991 to 2001.

Von Trotha died in Baden-Baden on 29 November 2025, at the age of 87. The celebration of life for von Trotha took place on 16 January 2026 at the University of Music Karlsruhe.
