= Higher Regional Court of Dresden =

German Higher Regional Court

- Oberlandesgericht Dresden
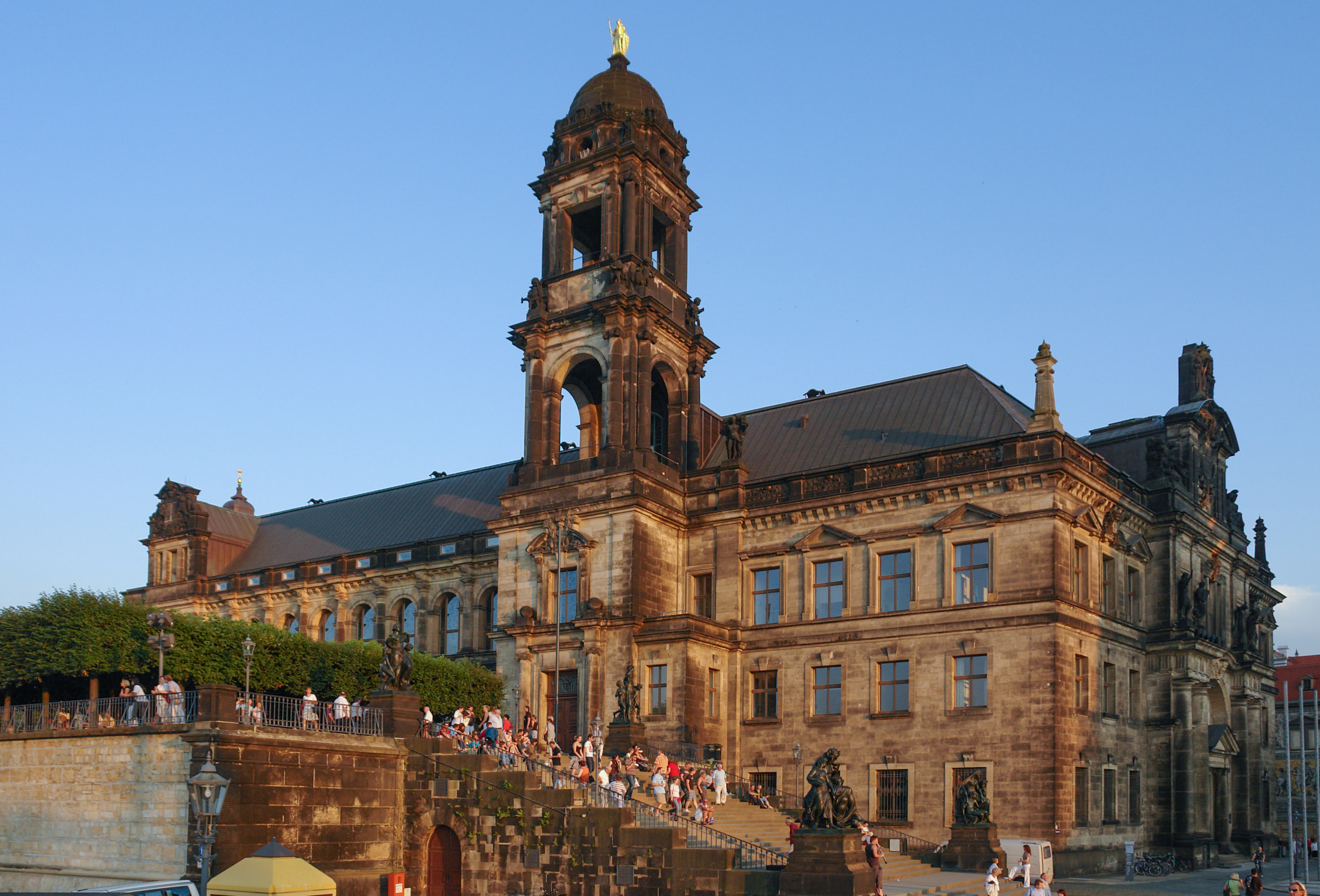
- Higher Regional Court of Dresden building, view from the Schloßplatz
- Interactive map of Higher Regional Court of Dresden
- 51°3′11.6″N 13°44′19.6″E
- Established: 1 January 1993
- Location: Schloßplatz 1, Dresden
- Coordinates: 51°3′11.6″N 13°44′19.6″E
- Authorised by: Gerichtsverfassungsgesetz
- Website: justiz.sachsen.de/olg/

President
- Currently: Leon Ross

The Higher Regional Court of Dresden (German: Oberlandesgericht Dresden; abbreviated: OLG Dresden) is the Higher Regional Court of Saxony.

== History ==
The Higher Regional Court was established on 1 October 1879, replacing the 1835 established Oberappellationsgericht (High Court of Appeal). In 1945, it's building, the "Landgerichtsgebäude Pillnitzer Straße" was destroyed during the bombing of Dresden in World War II.

In 1952, the court was dissolved due to a law established by East Germany, stating that the courts jurisdiction would be replaced with the Supreme Court of East Germany.

On 1 January 1993, the Higher Regional Court of Dresden was re-established.

The Higher Regional Court of Dresden is responsible for the special unit for judicial officers in Saxony, SGO, which was set up in 2019. It protects courts in dangerous trials throughout Saxony. The “Security Group of Judicial Sergeants for the Ordinary Jurisdiction” (SGO) consists of almost 20 officers.

== Former presidents of the court ==
=== (1879-1952) Before dissolution ===
- Anton von Weber (1879–1888)
- Heinrich Bethmann Klemm (1888–1890)
- Friedrich Alfred Degner (1890–1893)
- Karl Edmund Werner (1893–1898)
- August Julius Loßnitzer (1898–1908)
- Karl Heinrich Börner (1908–1913)
- Georg Albert Geßler (1913–1920)
- Karl Georg Paul Grützmann (1920–1922)
- Karl Emil Mannsfeld (1922–1929/31)
- Alfred Hüttner (1931–1939)
- Rudolf Beyer (1939–1945)
- Wilhelm Weiland (1945–1948)
- Carl Günther Ruland (1948–1950)
- Fritz Pogorschelsky (1950–1952)

=== (1993–) After re-establishment ===
- Günter Hirsch (1993–1995)
- Klaus Budewig (1995–2006)
- Ulrich Hagenloch (2006–2017)
- Gilbert Häfner (2017–2020)
- Leon Ross (since 2021)
