= 2025 Gelsenkirchen heist =

Bank burglary in Buer, Germany

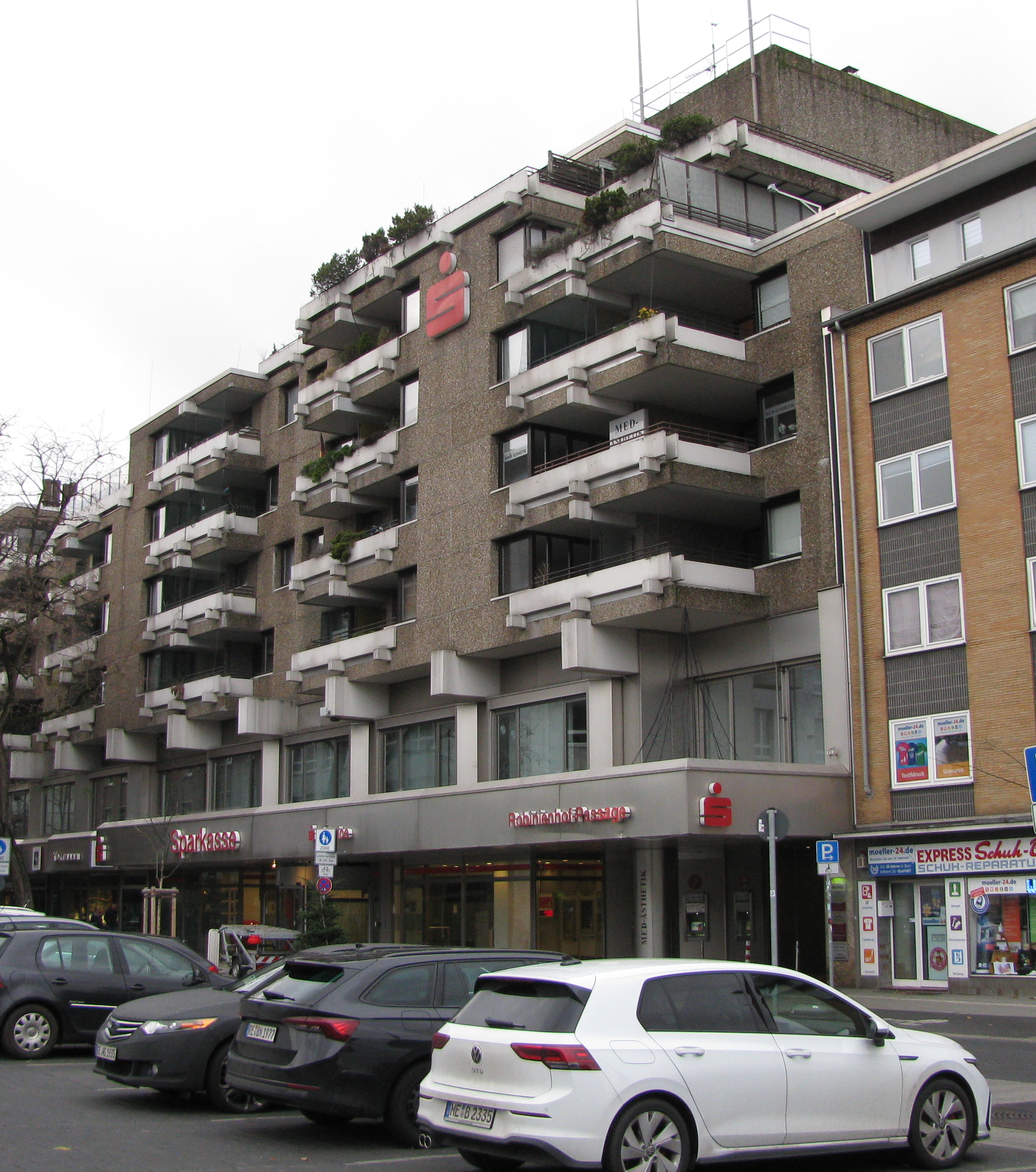
- Sparkasse in Gelsenkirchen-Buer, pictured in 2023
- Date: Weekend of 27 December 2025
- Venue: Sparkasse bank
- Location: Gelsenkirchen, North Rhine-Westphalia, Germany; 51.5791°N 7.0542°E
- Type: Bank burglary
- Stolen value: €30 million (initial estimates)

In December 2025, items worth an estimated €30 million were stolen from a Sparkasse bank in Buer, a suburb of Gelsenkirchen, Germany. The thieves used a large drill to break into the bank's underground vault and proceeded to crack over 3,000 safe deposit boxes. Authorities believe that the thieves broke into the Buer branch of the bank over the weekend, although it was not discovered by the police until a fire alarm went off early on Monday 29 December.

== Theft ==
The theft took place at a Sparkasse bank in Buer, Gelsenkirchen, Germany. The bank held 3,300 safe deposit boxes. The estimate of items stolen was initially reported as €30 million, with investigators suspecting the total value stolen as ranging between €10 million and €90 million.

According to police, the break-in likely occurred over the weekend of 27–28 December 2025. The thieves used a large drill to break into the vault. The boxes were held in the bank's underground vault, which was broken in to from the adjacent parking garage. Police have described the burglary as well organized and "very professionally executed".

During the night of 27 December, several men were seen by witnesses carrying large bags in the parking garage. In the early morning of 29 December, a black Audi RS 6 with masked men inside and a stolen licence plate left the parking garage.

The police had been alerted to dust and suspicious activity at the bank earlier on 27 December but found no signs of a break-in. An internal police review was begun regarding this oversight.

The theft was discovered after a fire alarm was triggered at 3:58 a.m. on 29 December. Police and firefighters arrived on the scene shortly after.

== Stolen items ==
Over 3,000 safe deposit boxes were broken into with an average insurance value of €10,000, although customers at the bank have said that the actual value may have been much higher. Items stolen included cash, jewelry and precious metals such as gold. Ninety-five percent of the boxes at the bank were broken into and an estimated 2,700 customers were affected. Most of the victims of the burglary were of Turkish or Arab origin. One Turkish victim claimed that the theft was likely deliberately targeted at foreign clients.

== Aftermath ==
As of March 2026, the identities of the criminals are unknown, no arrests have been made, and the perpetrators are at large. The thieves likely escaped the area before police were alerted to the break-in.

Following the announcement of the theft, hundreds of customers arrived at the bank to find out information regarding the theft and demanding access to their boxes. They were barred from entering by the police after threats were made toward employees. The bank has remained closed due to ongoing security threats.

On 2 January 2026, police released CCTV footage of the bank's underground parking garage showing the masked suspects entering and leaving with the aforementioned black Audi RS 6, and also a white van, whose involvement in the theft is being investigated. The suspects' use of branded clothing and colorful gloves was remarked as possibly facilitating future identification. The police also reported then that a task force was created to cope with the influx of tip-offs being received.

== Responses ==
A spokesperson for the Gelsenkirchen police said that the theft was "very professionally executed" and compared it to the film Ocean's Eleven. They also said that the theft had to have required extensive planning and inside knowledge of the bank.

According to Deutsche Presse-Agentur, the heist may be one of the largest thefts in German history.

On 19 February 2026, executives of the Sparkasse bank, the chief of police in charge of the investigations, and around 200 victims of the heist gathered in a conference to address concerns and doubts surrounding the crime. In the occasion, Sparkasse executives apologized for the incident, as well as for the lack of communication that followed.

== See also ==
- 1995 Berlin-Zehlendorf bank robbery—a 170-meter-tunnel-aided heist valued at 16.3 million Deutsche Marks (8.33 million Euros in 2025)
- 2013 Berlin-Steglitz bank heist—an unsolved 45-meter-tunnel-aided break-in valued between 9 and 10 million Euros
- 2025 Louvre heist
- Hatton Garden safe deposit burglary
