= Heinz Hardt =

German politician (1936–2025)

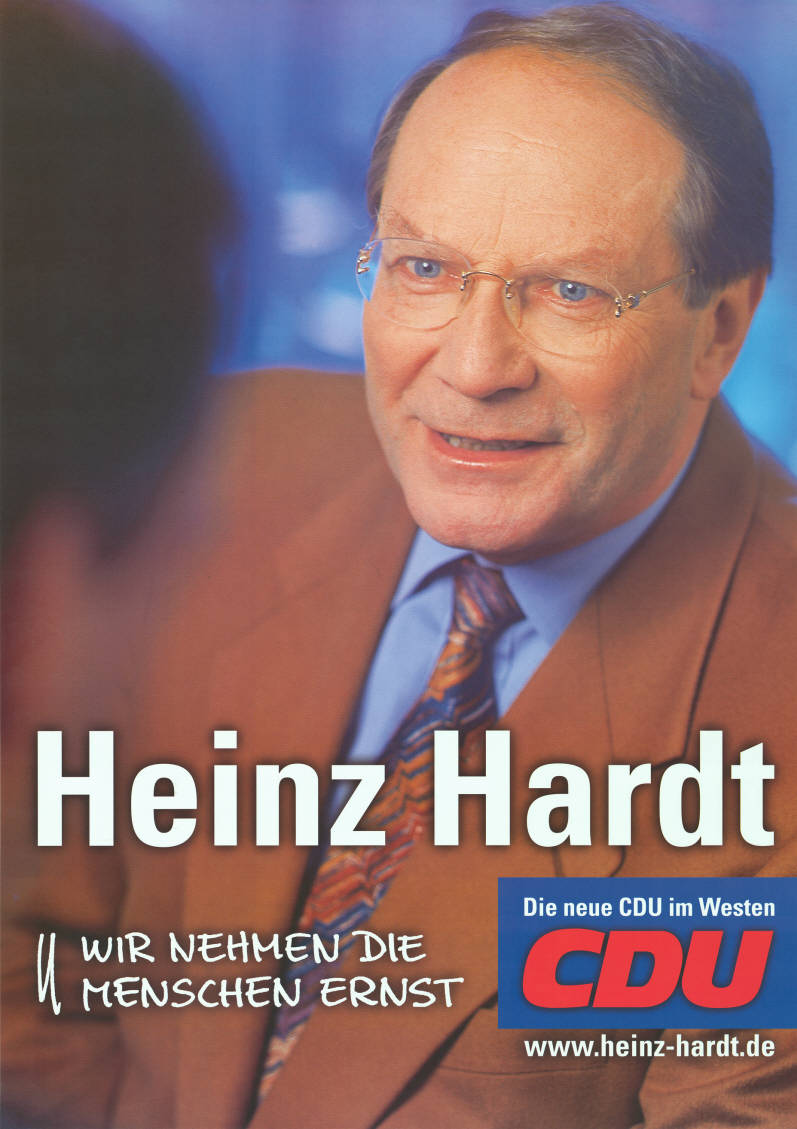
- Hardt campaign poster in 2000

Member of the Landtag of North Rhine-Westphalia
- In office 26 July 1970 – 2 June 2005

Personal details
- Born: 24 September 1936; Düsseldorf, Gau Düsseldorf, Germany
- Died: 7 August 2025 (aged 88)
- Political party: CDU
- Occupation: Technician

Heinz Hardt (24 September 1936 – 7 August 2025) was a German politician. A member of the Christian Democratic Union, he served in the Landtag of North Rhine-Westphalia from 1970 to 2005.

Hardt died on 7 August 2025, at the age of 88.
