= Walter Frankenstein =

German-born Swedish engineer and Holocaust survivor (1924–2025)

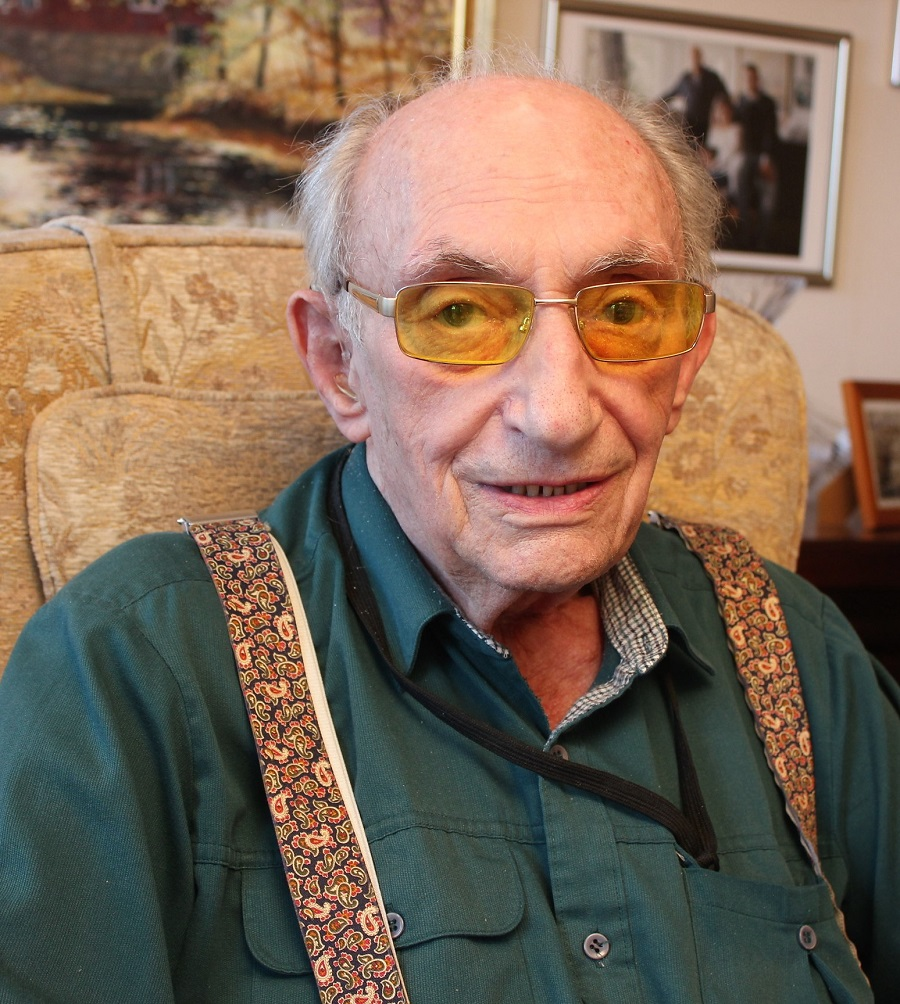
- Frankenstein in 2019
- Born: 30 June 1924; Flatow, Posen–West Prussia, Prussia, Weimar Republic
- Died: 21 April 2025 (aged 100); Stockholm, Sweden
- Occupation: Engineer
- Awards: Order of Merit of the Federal Republic of Germany

Walter Frankenstein (30 June 1924 – 21 April 2025) was a German-born Swedish engineer and Holocaust survivor.

== Biography ==
Frankenstein was born in Flatow, Posen–West Prussia. Following his father's death in 1929, he was raised by his uncle, Selmer Frankenstein, a doctor. He attended school until the age of 12; however, due to his Jewish faith, he was forced to stop. He mentioned attending the 1936 Summer Olympics with his uncle in Berlin, witnessing Jesse Owens win several medals. He witnessed the Kristallnacht from an orphanage.

After hearing how relatives were being deported, Frankenstein removed his Star of David and began hiding from the Gestapo. He married Leonie Rosner on 20 February 1942, and had a son, Peter-Uri. Following Leonie's mother's deportation, she stayed with Walter in the ruins of Berlin, having to move repeatedly to avoid detection until the city was liberated in May 1945. Following the end of the war, his wife emigrated to Palestine; however, Walter was forced to stay in Bavaria, being given the task of training young boys in physical education.

In 1946, after helping to rebuild the S/S San Dimitro in France and despite Britain limiting migration to Palestine, they left Marseille on 19 October 1946. The ship was eventually spotted and boarded by the crew of a British destroyer and the ship was brought into Haifa; however, the Jewish crew were ordered to Cyprus.

The reunited Frankenstein family then had to live in a small apartment in Hadera. Walter got a job as a tiler and, shortly thereafter, started his own company. At night, he was often called to the Haganah to participate in the protection of Jewish settlements. When the state of Israel was formed, Frankenstein was drafted and participated in the War of Independence. After the armistice in 1949, Frankenstein worked on irrigation ditches on kibbutzim and piping at the Dead Sea. However, the work took a toll on his body and, in 1956, the family decided to move to Northern Europe.

Walter Frankenstein had kept in touch with his childhood friend, Rolf Rothschild, a civil engineer and Swedish citizen. The Frankenstein family therefore traveled to Stockholm, where they were helped with housing in Bandhagen. In 1964, Frankenstein began studying, graduated from high school and, in 1970, became a civil engineer. He found work as a building designer and then worked as a material tester at nuclear power plants in Sweden and Finland.

Frankenstein died in Stockholm on 21 April 2025, at the age of 100.

== Legacy ==
Frankenstein was awarded the Order of Merit of the Federal Republic of Germany. He helped create a number of memorials throughout Germany, including a memorial plaque at Edith Berlow's residence in Schöneberg, Berlin. Berlow helped the family hide during their time in Berlin.
