= Günter Hirsch =

German legal scholar (born 1943)

Günter Hirsch (born 30 January 1943) is a German legal scholar who served as the seventh President of the Federal Court of Justice of Germany from 2000 to 2008.

== Biography ==
Günter Erhard Hirsch was born in Neuburg an der Donau, the second child of Erhard and Anni Hirsch. After primary school, he attended gymnasium in Neuburg, graduating with his abitur in 1964. From 1964 to 1969, he studied jurisprudence at the University of Erlangen-Nuremberg. He took his first state exam in 1969, followed by the second one in 1973. During this period, he also worked as a research assistant for the chair of criminal law at the University of Erlangen-Nuremberg. He also completed his doctorate there.

In 1973, Hirsch started working in the Bavarian judicial service, first as a public prosecutor from 1975 to 1976, then from 1976 until 1980 as a judge at an Amtsgericht (local district court). After attending a 15-month course on administrative management at the state chancellery of Bavaria, he became a presiding judge at a Landgericht (regional court), serving from 1982 to 1984. Later, he worked at the Bavarian state ministry of justice, where he became an assistant director and the head of the division for legislative planning, constitutional law and European law between 1989 and 1992.

He then became the president of diverse courts. From 1 September 1992 to 31 December 1992 he was president of the Bezirksgericht (district court) of Dresden; from 1993 until 6 October 1994 he was president of the Higher Regional Court of Dresden. From 6 June 1993 to 31 March 1995 he was also president of the Constitutional Court of Saxony. From 1994 to 2000, he was an appointed judge at the European Court of Justice, as well.

From 2000 to January 2008, he was president of the Federal Court of Justice of Germany. He is the vice president of the association of the presidents of the highest courts of justice of the European Union as well as president of the academy for management and commerce Baden in Karlsruhe. He is a member of the disciplinary commission of the FIFA, a member of academy ethics in medicine, a member of the society for comparative law and a member of the society for public international law. From 1984 to 1994, he was also the secretary-general and vice president of the German society for medical law.

Hirsch is an honorary professor for European and medical law at the Saarland University. He has to his credit numerous publications in the fields of criminal law, medical law, public law and European law. Hirsch is married to Marta Hirsch-Ziembiñska, a jurist and diplomat.

== See also ==
- List of members of the European Court of Justice
