= Friedrich Kronenberg =

German politician (1933–2025)

Member of the Bundestag
- In office 29 March 1983 – 20 December 1990

Personal details
- Born: 16 February 1933 Gelsenkirchen, Westphalia, Prussia, Germany
- Died: 1 February 2025 (aged 91)
- Political party: CDU
- Education: University of Münster
- Occupation: Economist

Friedrich Kronenberg (16 February 1933 – 1 February 2025) was a German politician. A member of the Christian Democratic Union, he served in the Bundestag from 1983 to 1990.

Kronenberg died on 1 February 2025, at the age of 91.
