= Klaus Willbrand =

German bookseller (1941–2025)

Klaus Willbrand (5 August 1941 – 29 January 2025) was a German bookseller and literary critic.

== Biography ==
Willbrand was born in Essen but grew up in Leverkusen. After graduating from high school, he completed an apprenticeship in the Cologne bookstore Witsch & Co. in the 1960s, where he became the "First Assortment" in 1962.

In 1962, Willbrand met the writer Rolf Dieter Brinkmann. Willbrand then founded his own publishing house in Leverkusen and published a collection of poems by Brinkmann under the title Ihr nennt es Sprache (in English: You call it language) in a circulation of 500 copies. However, this was destroyed by Brinkmann due to four misprints. Only years later did the works go on sale. In Berlin he met Ulrike Meinhof and worked as an editor. In 1994, Willbrand was involved in the establishment of Berlin Verlag. In the late 1990s he returned to the Rhineland. Together with his colleague Daria Razumovych, he wrote a book Einfach Literatur – Eine Einladung, which should be published in June 2025.

In 2001, Willbrand founded his antiquarian shop in Cologne. The range focused in particular on fiction. After the store had collapsed sharply due to the COVID-19 pandemic, the turnover was so low at the beginning of 2024 that the shop was originally to be closed. In March 2024, Willbrand launched a channel together with his business partner Daria Razumovych on TikTok, Instagram and YouTube. In no time, the videos went viral. In his videos, Willbrand went into the current literary world, rated already published works and gave book recommendations. He became known as "Bookfluencer".

Willbrand died on 29 January 2025 in a hospital in Cologne, at the age of 83.
