= Robert Maus =

German politician (1933–2025)

Member of the Landtag of Baden-Württemberg
- In office 1972–1996

Personal details
- Born: 9 June 1933; Singen, Baden, Germany
- Died: 7 February 2025 (aged 91)
- Political party: CDU
- Education: Heidelberg University; University of Bonn; University of Freiburg
- Occupation: Judge; Prosecutor

Robert Maus (9 June 1933 – 7 February 2025) was a German politician. A member of the Christian Democratic Union, he served in the Landtag of Baden-Württemberg from 1972 to 1996.

Maus died on 7 February 2025, at the age of 91.
