= Gerd Wirth =

German politician (1951–2025)

Member of the Landtag of North Rhine-Westphalia for Märkischer Kreis III
- In office 31 May 1990 – 2 June 2005

Personal details
- Born: 21 December 1951; Lüdenscheid, North Rhine-Westphalia, West Germany
- Died: 2 February 2025 (aged 73)
- Political party: SPD
- Education: Hagen University of Applied Sciences
- Occupation: Social worker

Gerd Wirth (21 December 1951 – 2 February 2025) was a German politician. A member of the Social Democratic Party, he served in the Landtag of North Rhine-Westphalia from 1990 to 2005.

Wirth died on 2 February 2025, at the age of 73.
