= Julia Dingwort-Nusseck =

German journalist (1921–2025)

Julia Dingwort-Nusseck (6 October 1921 – 7 June 2025) was a German business journalist.

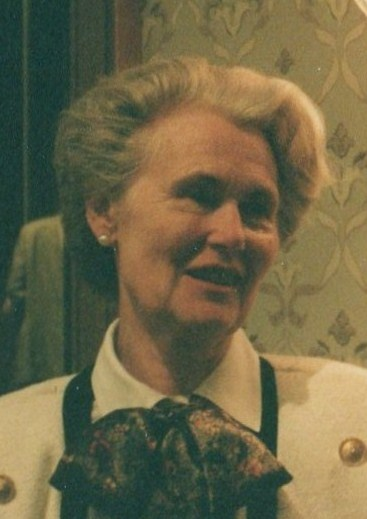
Julia Dingwort-Nusseck

== Early life and career ==
Julia Nusseck was born in Altona 6 October 1921. She graduated from the Gymnasium Allee in Hamburg-Altona in 1940 and studied economics at the universities of Hamburg and Tübingen, graduating in 1943 with a degree in economics. After receiving her doctorate in 1944, she became board secretary at the Neue Sparkasse von 1864 in Hamburg. In 1946, she became a business editor at Radio Hamburg in the British occupation zone. She took over as head of the economics department in 1947 when her superiors left after their Nazi past became known.

She became deputy editor-in-chief of television at Westdeutscher Rundfunk in 1969 and editor-in-chief on 1 November 1973. She held this position until 30 September 1976.

In June 1976, Lower Saxony's Finance Minister Walther Leisler Kiep nominated her as President of the Lower Saxony State Central Bank with the support of Prime Minister Ernst Albrecht. The Bundesbank's Central Bank Council rejected her by ten votes to six. Since the Central Bank Council only had a right to be heard in this matter she became President of the Lower Saxony State Central Bank on 1 October 1976 and in this function a member of the Central Bank Council. Because of her new office, she had to resign from her supervisory board mandate at Horten AG. Later, she received a unanimous nomination from the members of the Central Bank Council for her second term. She left the board in 1988.

From 28 April 1981 to 12 March 1984, she was chairwoman of the administrative board of Norddeutscher Rundfunk (NDR) after which she took over the post of deputy chairman. From 24 April 1991 to 29 October 1993, she was again Chairwoman of the Board of Directors of NDR.

From 1990 to 1999, she was the 2nd chairwoman of the Association of German Foundations and had been an honorary member since 1999. She was a member of Zonta International, president of the Zonta Club Hamburg for several years and most recently honorary member.

== Personal life and death ==
Julia Dingwort-Nusseck was married to publisher Carl-Wolfgang Dingwort from 1951 until his death in 2011. The marriage produced a son and two daughters.

Dingwort-Nusseck died on 7 June 2025, at the age of 103.
