= Wolfgang Fiedler =

German politician (1951–2025)

Member of the Volkskammer
- In office 18 March 1990 – 2 October 1990

Member of the Landtag of Thuringia
- In office 25 October 1990 – 14 October 2014
- Constituency: Wahlkreis Stadtroda – Jena, Land (1990–1994); Saale-Holzland-Kreis I (1994–2014)

Personal details
- Born: 20 November 1951 Jena, East Germany
- Died: 8 October 2025 (aged 73)
- Party: CDU
- Occupation: Engineer

Wolfgang Fiedler (20 November 1951 – 8 October 2025) was a German politician. A member of the Christian Democratic Union, he served in the Volkskammer from March to October 1990 and was a member of the Landtag of Thuringia from 1990 to 2014.

Fiedler died on 8 October 2025, at the age of 73.
