= Olga Sippl =

German politician (1920–2025)

- Born: Olga Stohwasser; 19 September 1920; Stará Role, Czechoslovakia
- Died: 18 October 2025 (aged 105)

Olga Sippl (née Stohwasser; 19 September 1920 – 18 October 2025) was a German social democrat politician and author of Sudeten German origin and one of the founding members of the Seliger Community.

== Life and career ==
Coming from a Social Democratic family in Altrohlau (now Stará Role), she came into contact with various organizations of the Sudeten German labour movement at an early age. At five years of age, she joined the children's gymnastics class of the Workers' Gymnastics and Sports Association. Later, she became a member of the Red Falcons and the Socialist Youth.

After finishing school she took a job at the Urania in Karlsbad. In 1936 she became a member of the German Social Democratic Workers' Party in the Czechoslovak Republic. From 1938 she worked for the Social Insurance Institution in Prague. Because of her date of birth she was barred at the last minute from emigrating to England with her parents, so on 8 March 1939, shortly before the German Wehrmacht occupied Prague, she decided to return to Altrohlau with her then boyfriend and later husband Ernst, where she worked at the Agricultural Reconstruction Office. Her son Herbert († 1984) was born at the end of December 1943. Her husband was killed in Courland in March 1945.

After the war, she took on office work in the Karlovy Vary Antifa office, which was tasked with compiling lists of reliable Social Democrats and Communists. On 20 November 1946, she left Karlovy Vary on the last Antifa transport and, with her son, was taken to the Furth im Wald border transit camp. After another stay in Königsdorf, where she helped found a local SPD chapter in March 1948, and a brief stay with her parents in Birmingham, England, she became an employee of the Bavarian SPD in Munich on 1 July 1949.

In 1951, she signed the founding charter of the Seliger Congregation alongside Richard Reitzner, Alois Ullmann, and Emil Werner. In the following years, she served on the editorial staff of the publishing house Die Brücke, which published the Seliger Congregation's newsletter and other publications.

Even before, but especially after, the Velvet Revolution , she traveled several times to Czechoslovakia and the Czech Republic, her former homeland, to promote understanding between Czechs and Germans. In numerous articles, she also described the work of the Sudeten German Social Democrats. For her efforts toward reconciliation between Germans and Czechs and for her commitment to the Seliger Community, she was awarded the Order of Merit of the Federal Republic of Germany in 2002. In 2016, she received the Karel Kramář Medal from the hands of Czech Prime Minister Bohuslav Sobotka.

Sippl died on 18 October 2025, at the age of 105.

== Works ==
- Letzter Versuch zum deutsch-tschechischen Ausgleich vor 50 Jahren Münich 1987.
- Ein Sohn des Volkes. Ernst Paul zum 100. Geburtstag; ein Lebensbild nach archivarischen Unterlagen die Brücke, Münich 1997.
- Rückschau auf 50 Jahre Seliger-Gemeinde, Münich 2001.
- Treuegemeinschaft sudetendeutscher Sozialdemokraten in Schweden |im Spiegel des Sudeten-Jahrbuches der Seliger-Gemeinde, Münich 2008.

== Literature ==
- Alena Wagnerová: Helden der Hoffnung. Die anderen Deutschen aus den Sudeten 1935-1989 aufbau, Berlin 2008 Jahr, ISBN 978-3-351-02657-8.
