= Tim Kruger =

German pornographic film actor, producer and director (1981–2025)

- Born: Marcel Bonn; 25 January 1981; Düsseldorf, North Rhine-Westphalia, West Germany
- Died: 1 March 2025 (aged 44); Mallorca, Balearic Islands, Spain
- Occupations: Adult film actor, producer, and director
- Years active: 2006–2025

Marcel Bonn (25 January 1981 – 1 March 2025) was a German pornographic film actor, producer and director known professionally as Tim Kruger. He entered the pornographic film industry in 2006 and later co-founded the website TimTales in 2009, where he produced and performed in amateur-style gay pornography until his death.

== Early life ==
Bonn was born on 25 January 1981 in Düsseldorf, Germany. He trained in business administration.

== Career ==
Bonn/Kruger worked at a pornography store in Berlin, where he became interested in performing in adult films. He sent emails and photos to studios and was subsequently contacted for roles. In 2006, Kruger began his career in the adult film industry. He appeared in productions for various studios, including Cazzo Film, Hot House, and Raging Stallion Studios. He acted in films such as DeskTops, Pizza Cazzone, Tim's Tool, Wood Work, Hot House Backroom, Vol. 10, and The Deep End.

In 2009, Kruger started his website, TimTales, in collaboration with his partner, who served as the cameraman and occasional onscreen participant. The website included amateur-style gay pornography with a focus on authenticity. Kruger stated that the site's content was based on personal preferences rather than scripted performances. He also continued to work for external studios while maintaining the website.

== Personal life and death ==
Kruger was in a long-term relationship with his partner, Grobes Geraet, who assisted with the production and editing of his videos. He described himself as more reserved in his personal life compared to his on-camera persona. Kruger died on 1 March 2025, at the age of 44, following an accident at his home in Mallorca. A statement attributed to his partner stated that the accident was not related to drugs, foul play or suicide.

== Accolades ==
As the founder of TimTales.com, as well for his work as an adult performer, Kruger achieved several recognitions during his career in the pornography film industry, including nominations for four GayVN Awards, four HustlaBall Awards, seven Prowler European Porn Awards, eight Cybersocket Web Awards, nine XBIZ Europa Awards, and fifteen Grabby Awards, winning two HustlaBall Awards in 2015 and 2016, one Prowler European Porn Award in 2019, and one Grabby Award in 2024.

List of awards and nominations received by Tim Kruger
Award	Year	Category	Nominated work	Result	Ref.
GayVN Awards	2008	Best Group Scene	Fisting Underground III (shared with Danny Fox, Violator, Aaron King, Adam Faust, Demetrius, Lee Heyford, Aaron Summers and Tommy Rawlins)	Nominated	
Cybersocket Web Awards	2010	Best Reality Site	TimTales.com	Nominated	
Cybersocket Web Awards	2010	Best Amateur Video Site	TimTales.com	Nominated	
Cybersocket Web Awards	2010	Best Mobile Site	TimTales.com	Nominated	
Cybersocket Web Awards	2010	Best Porn Star	Himself	Nominated	
Cybersocket Web Awards	2015	Best Porn Star	Himself	Nominated	
Cybersocket Web Awards	2015	Best Content Producer	TimTales.com	Nominated	
Cybersocket Web Awards	2015	Best Video Site	TimTales.com	Nominated	
Cybersocket Web Awards	2015	Best European Site	TimTales.com	Nominated	
HustlaBall Awards	2015	Best Studio	TimTales.com	Won	
Grabby Awards	2016	Hottest Cock	Himself	Nominated	
Grabby Awards	2016	Manly Man	Himself	Nominated	
HustlaBall Awards	2016	Best Hunk Scene	Tim Kruger and Darius Ferdynand for Tim Tales	Won	
HustlaBall Awards	2016	Europe’s Best Scene	Tim Kruger and Ian Torres for Tim Tales	Nominated	
HustlaBall Awards	2016	Best Website	TimTales.com	Nominated	
Prowler European Porn Awards	2016	Best International Porn Star	Himself	Nominated	
Prowler European Porn Awards	2018	Best European Top	Himself	Nominated	
Prowler European Porn Awards	2018	Best European Daddy	Himself	Nominated	
Prowler European Porn Awards	2018	Hottest European Porn Star	Himself	Nominated	
Prowler European Porn Awards	2018	Best European Website	TimTales.com	Nominated	
Prowler European Porn Awards	2018	Best European Studio	TimTales.com	Nominated	
Str8UpGayPorn Awards	2018	Favorite International Star	Himself	Nominated	
GayVN Awards	2018	Favorite Daddy	Himself	Nominated	
GayVN Awards	2018	Favorite Membership Site	TimTales.com	Nominated	
Prowler European Porn Awards	2019	Best European Couple	Tim Kruger and John Thomas for Tim Tales	Won	
XBIZ Europa Awards	2019	Gay Performer of the Year	Himself	Nominated	
XBIZ Europa Awards	2019	Gay Site of the Year	TimTales.com	Nominated	
Fleshbot Awards	2020	Best Daddy	Himself	Nominated	
GayVN Awards	2021	Performer of the Year	Himself	Nominated	
XBIZ Europa Awards	2021	Gay Performer of the Year	Himself	Nominated	
XBIZ Europa Awards	2021	Gay Site of the Year	TimTales.com	Nominated	
XBIZ Europa Awards	2022	Gay Performer of the Year	Himself	Nominated	
XBIZ Europa Awards	2022	Gay Site of the Year	TimTales.com	Nominated	
XBIZ Europa Awards	2023	Gay Performer of the Year	Himself	Nominated	
XBIZ Europa Awards	2023	Gay Site of the Year	TimTales.com	Nominated	
XBIZ Europa Awards	2024	Gay Performer of the Year	Himself	Nominated	
Grabby Awards	2024	Pornstar of the Year	Himself	Nominated	
Grabby Awards	2024	Most Accomplished International Pornstar	Himself	Nominated	
Grabby Awards	2024	Best Daddy	Himself	Nominated	
Grabby Awards	2024	Best Top	Himself	Nominated	
Grabby Awards	2024	Content Creator of the Year	Himself	Nominated	
Grabby Awards	2024	Best Website	TimTales.com	Nominated	
Grabby Awards	2024	Director of the Year	Tim Kruger for Tim Tales	Nominated	
Grabby Awards	2024	Best Duo	Bastian Karim & Tim Kruger for Tim Tales	Won	
Grabby Awards	2024	Best Duo	John Thomas & Tim Kruger for Tim Tales	Nominated	
Grabby Awards	2024	Collaboration of the Year	Teddy Bryce & Tim Kruger for Fansite Content	Nominated	
Grabby Awards	2024	Best Scene	Tim Kruger & John Thomas for Tim Tales	Nominated	
Grabby Awards	2024	Best Group Scene	Tim Kruger, Caio Veyron, Allen King & Luciano for "Timtales Holiday Fuckfest" on Tim Tales	Nominated	
Grabby Awards	2024	Best Group Scene	John Thomas, Diego Mattos, Maksim Orlov, Tim Kruger for "John’s Triple Double Penetration" on Tim Tales	Nominated	
