= Angela Tillmann =

German politician (1957–2025)

- 2016

Member of the Landtag of North Rhine-Westphalia
- In office 2005–2010
- In office 2016–2017

Personal details
- Born: 31 January 1957 Berlin
- Died: 23 April 2025 (aged 68) Mönchengladbach
- Party: Social Democratic

Angela Tillmann (31 January 1957 – 23 April 2025) was a German politician from the Social Democratic Party (SPD).

== Early life ==
Tillmann was born in Berlin in 1957. Tillmann completed her secondary education in 1976. From 1976 to 1979, she trained as an industrial clerk. From 1979 to 1980, she attended a vocational college specializing in economics in Mönchengladbach, graduating with a university entrance qualification. From 1980 to 1984, she studied social pedagogy at the Niederrhein University of Applied Sciences in Mönchengladbach, graduating with a diploma in social pedagogy in 1984. Since 1985, she has worked as an employee in the youth services department of the Düsseldorf city administration.

== Political career ==
Angela Tillmann joined the SPD in 1989. From 1990 to 1994, she was deputy chair of the Mönchengladbach-Mitte local branch. From 1992 to 1994, she was deputy chair of the Mönchengladbach subdistrict and of the Working Group of Social Democratic Women (ASF). From 1996 to 2000, she was chair of the Mönchengladbach-Mitte local branch, and between 1994 and 1996, as well as since 2000, she has been a member of the Mönchengladbach subdistrict executive committee.

From 1994 until her election to the state parliament of North Rhine-Westphalia in 2005, she was a member of the Mönchengladbach city council, where she also served as deputy chairwoman of the parliamentary group from 1999.

From 2005 to 2010, Angela Tillmann was a member of the Landtag of North Rhine-Westphalia for the Mönchengladbach II constituency (constituency 50). She was elected via the state party list. On 1 January 2016, she was re-elected to the State Parliament, succeeding Roland Adelmann. She is not a member of the State Parliament elected in 2017, as her position on the party list, at number 61, was not high enough to secure her a seat.

Tillman died on April 23, 2025.
