= Ulf Fink =

German politician (1942–2025)

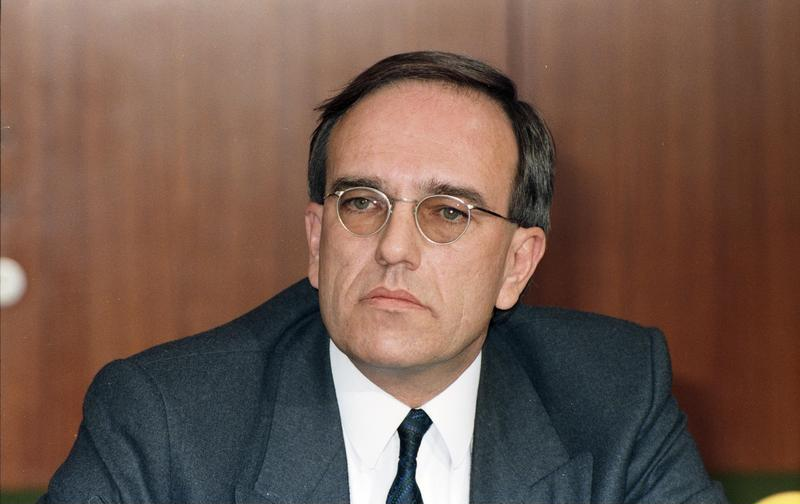
- Fink in 1998

Member of the Bundestag
- In office 1994–2002

Personal details
- Born: 6 October 1942 Freiberg, Germany
- Died: 12 September 2025 (aged 82)
- Party: CDU

Ulf Fink (6 October 1942 – 12 September 2025) was a German politician of the Christian Democratic Union (CDU) and member of the German Bundestag.

== Life and career ==
In 1994, Fink was elected to the German Bundestag via the state list of Brandenburg, of which he was a member for two legislative periods until 2002. He died on 12 September 2025.
