= Paul Tremmel =

German poet (1929–2025)

Paul Tremmel (30 September 1929 – 22 November 2025) was a German poet.

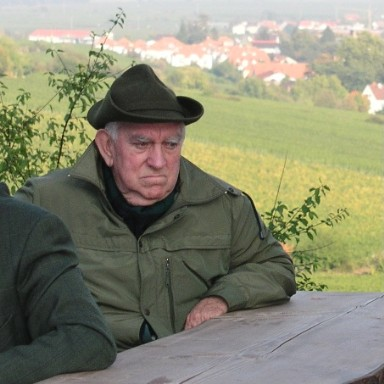
Tremmel in 2005

== Life and career ==
Tremmel was born in Theisbergstegen, Bavaria on 30 September 1929. At the age of 15, Tremmel was drafted during World War II, being involved in entrenchment work at the Battle of the Bulge.

After the war, Tremmel began an apprenticeship as a locksmith and then worked for a time in a quarry near his birthplace, and for a company that manufactured conveyor belts. Finally, he settled in Forst an der Weinstraße, where he opened a filling station, which later developed into a car dealership.

His poetry career began in 1972, when he was asked to write a poem at a birthday party; this was well received, with the daily newspaper Die Rheinpfalz comparing Tremmel to Bellemer Heiner. In 1972 and 1973, he was among the prize winners at the Palatinate Dialect Poets' Competition in Bockenheim.

Throughout his career, he published more than three dozen books, mostly using the Palatinate dialect.

The municipality of Forst an der Weinstraße named Tremmel its honorary citizen and dedicated the Dichterweg to him, which was inaugurated in his presence on his 95th birthday.

Tremmel died on 22 November 2025, at the age of 96.
