= Christine Wischer =

German politician (1944–2025)

Member of the Bürgerschaft of Bremen
- In office 13 October 1987 – 4 July 1995

Member of the Senate of Bremen
- In office 1995–2003

Personal details
- Born: 2 March 1944 Burg bei Magdeburg, Gau Magdeburg-Anhalt, Germany
- Died: 17 January 2025 (aged 80)
- Party: SPD

Christine Wischer (2 March 1944 – 17 January 2025) was a German politician. A member of the Social Democratic Party. She served in the Bürgerschaft of Bremen from 1987 to 1995 and was a member of the Senate of Bremen from 1995 to 2003.

Wischer died on 17 January 2025, at the age of 80.
