= Rolf Seelmann-Eggebert =

German journalist (1937–2025)

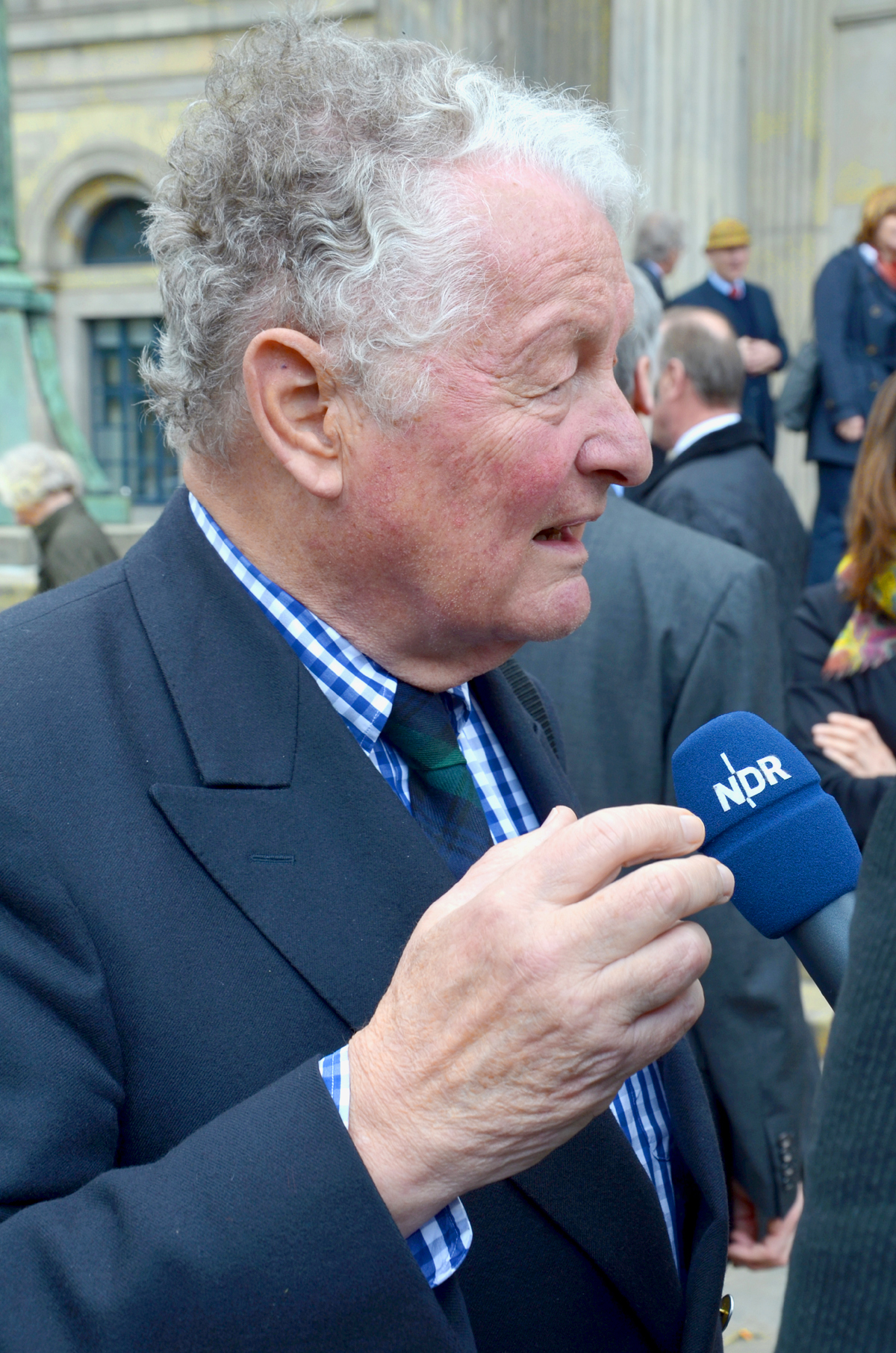
Rolf Seelmann-Eggebert

Rolf Seelmann-Eggebert (5 February 1937 – 22 August 2025) was a German journalist and television presenter. He died on 22 August 2025 in Hamburg, at the age of 88. He was married and had three children.

== Awards ==
- 1985: Goldener Gong for Day for Afrika, which Seelmann-Eggebert in January 1985 in Germany started
- 1985: Goldene Kamera as author for his documentary serie Royalty
- 1990: Order of the British Empire (OBE)
- 1985: Verdienstkreuz am Bande des Verdienstordens der Bundesrepublik Deutschland
- 1992: Commander des Order of the British Empire (CBE)
- 1992: Bambi Award
- 2002: Verdienstkreuz 1. Klasse des Verdienstordens der Bundesrepublik Deutschland
- 2011: Deutscher Fernsehpreis
- 2017: Dr.-Carl-Linder-Award
